= Dead of Night (Torchwood) =

2011 Torchwood episode

34 – "Dead of Night"
- Torchwood episode

Cast
- Starring: John Barrowman – Captain Jack Harkness; Eve Myles – Gwen Cooper; Mekhi Phifer – Rex Matheson; Alexa Havins – Esther Drummond; Kai Owen – Rhys Williams; Bill Pullman – Oswald Danes
- Others: Lauren Ambrose – Jilly Kitzinger; Arlene Tur – Vera Juarez; Wayne Knight – Brian Friedkin; Dillon Casey – Brad; Richard Gilliland – Congressman Morganthall; Tasha Ames – Carla; Thea Andrews – Local Reporter; Richard Augustine – George Sayer; Daryl Crittenden – Young Man; Mitchell Edmonds – Senior TV Anchor; Matt Eyde – Atlanta Cop; Mary Garripoli – Woman Tourist; Ted Mattison – Phi-Corp Rep; Jason Medwin – Sunroof Screamer; George Murdock – Preacher; Brian Treitler – Dr. Murphy; Randa Walker – Candice Perlmutter; Maurice Webster – Cop; Michelle Wong – Nurse; David Youse – Dr. Rosenbloom

Production
- Directed by: Billy Gierhart
- Written by: Jane Espenson
- Produced by: Kelly A. Manners
- Executive producers: Russell T Davies; Julie Gardner; Jane Tranter; Jane Espenson (co-executive); Vlad Wolynetz (co-executive)
- Music by: Murray Gold
- Production code: 103
- Series: Miracle Day
- Running time: 56 mins
- First broadcast: 22 July 2011 (US); 28 July 2011 (UK)

Chronology
← Preceded by "Rendition"	Followed by → "Escape to L.A."

"Dead of Night" is the third episode of Torchwood: Miracle Day, the fourth series of the British science fiction television series Torchwood. It was originally broadcast in the United States on Starz on 22 July 2011, in Canada on Space on 23 July 2011, and in the United Kingdom on BBC One on 28 July 2011.

Torchwood: Miracle Day follows the aftermath of a day where humanity has stopped being able to die. In the episode, Central Intelligence Agency agents Rex Matheson (Mekhi Phifer) and Esther Drummond (Alexa Havins) have gone on the run and joined the Torchwood team after being framed as traitors. Torchwood discovers a pharmaceutical company, with apparent foreknowledge of "Miracle Day", has been stockpiling painkiller medication.

== Plot summary ==
Rex (Mekhi Phifer) and Esther (Alexa Havins) have joined Torchwood out of necessity. The team successfully acquire the phone from CIA director Friedkin (Wayne Knight), through which Friedkin received mysterious orders to exterminate Torchwood. The team follow leads and uncover a stockpile of painkillers at the pharmaceutical corporation PhiCorp, indicating they knew the Miracle was going to happen. At a loose end, Jack (John Barrowman) takes the night off and picks up a man in a bar, and Rex seeks solace in his surgeon, Vera Juarez (Arlene Tur). Juarez tells Rex that PhiCorp representative Jilly Kitzinger (Lauren Ambrose) has invited her along to an important meeting tomorrow; Rex recruits Juarez to listen in for Torchwood, while Gwen (Eve Myles) goes on a mission with the special Torchwood contact lenses and steals information from Kitzinger's computer. The meeting turns out to be a seminar, where Congressman Morganthall announces plans to make painkillers legal to purchase without prescription. At Torchwood HQ, Rex and Esther receive a mysterious phone call from Friedkin's anonymous superiors and figuring their base has been compromised, realise that Torchwood must now leave D.C.

Released murderer Oswald Danes (Bill Pullman) struggles to fit into the real world, and after being assaulted by police officers accepts Kitzinger's earlier offer of representation. He attends a select board meeting at PhiCorp. PhiCorp award him personal security on the condition he promotes their new painkiller legislation on national television to his growing following. Suspicious of Danes, Jack confronts him at the TV station. Jack gets Danes to admit that he does not feel forgiveness, but also that he enjoyed the rape and murder of his 12-year-old victim; Jack realises from this speech that Danes has a death wish that is being denied him. Danes' security assaults Jack and releases him onto the streets just as Danes tells the world about the need for PhiCorp's painkiller legislation.

== Sex scene broadcast differences ==
"Dead of Night" features concurrent gay and straight sex scenes; the straight sex scene features Rex and Vera (Mekhi Phifer and Arlene Tur), and the gay scene features John Barrowman and guest actor Dillon Casey, playing bartender Brad. Gay men's website AfterElton.com enthusiastically reported on Casey's casting in March; the casting side for Brad, released in December 2010, had assuaged fears that Jack would be "de-gayed" by American network Starz. Barrowman later told Access Hollywood reporters that the gay sex scene the series would feature would be more explicit than previous shots of its kind in Torchwood, because Starz as a US premium cable network allowed the show to "push the envelope a little bit more". For airings in the UK, the BBC (a public broadcast network) edited the scene because it was deemed inappropriate for the primetime slot. However, a BBC spokesperson stated that the edit would not affect the story in any way. Barrowman however, responded by saying that sex scenes in the show were not gratuitous, and did form a part of the plot.

== Reception ==
The A.V. Club's Zack Handlen awarded "Dead of Night" a B− rating. He felt that the episode did not have any truly tense scenes compared to previous episode "Rendition". While he celebrated that the "two-fer sex scene" was unusual for mainstream science fiction, Handlen felt it "didn't make for gripping television", and felt Jack's hook-up was at least more believable than the prospect of a Rex/Vera romance. Though he gave the episode a relatively high rating, and was optimistic for Miracle Day as a series, Handlen's concluding paragraph stated "an episode like this isn't a good sign". Los Angeles Times reviewer Emily VanDerWerff wrote "With every week it’s on the air, Torchwood: Miracle Day continues to expand its scope"; her review was largely positive but marked with criticisms. She felt "the episode's mid-section was where it was flabbiest", referring to Gwen's contact with Rhys and the sex scenes. Like Handlen, she remarked on the believability of the Rex/Vera pairing, saying "It made sense for later in the episode that Rex and Vera had hooked up (since it gave her stronger motivation to work with Torchwood), but in the moment, it seemed ludicrously convenient." Like Handlen, VanDerWerff didn't find the American public's reaction to Danes believable either. However, her summary said "All in all, this was a "putting the pieces in place" kind of episode, and though some of the pieces were moved quite inelegantly—again, the Rex and Vera hook-up—much of whether this episode stands out as the start of a decline or a brief hiccup will be determined by where the pieces go from here."

Assignment X gave the episode a positive review, stating "Although there’s certainly plenty here for new viewers to enjoy, there’s such a richness of character development for old fans to appreciate." WhatCulture! gave the episode 5 stars, praising it as "easily the best episode of the series thus far", with "plenty of character development" and plot momentum, which bodes well for Starz' Miracle Day investment. Den of Geek gave the episode a positive review, praising Espenson's script for having "fun with the cultural differences" in the Torchwood team, and for the development of friction around Rex. The reviewer praised the use of "old fashioned Torchwood technology" from past seasons, and praised the episode on a whole for showing " what Torchwood continues to do extremely well, namely, the slower moments, where very good characters are put in extraordinary situations. It sounds a very simple thing to praise Miracle Day for, but it's something that many, many shows get wrong."

In the United Kingdom the consolidated ratings reveal that 5.49 million viewers watched this episode, making it the 8th most popular of the week. Between broadcast on the 28th and the end of July the programme had amassed a further 410,000 viewers on the UK catch up service iPlayer.
