= Torchwood =

British science fiction television series (2006–2011)

- Genre: Science fiction; Horror; Fantasy; Drama
- Created by: Russell T Davies
- Showrunners: Russell T Davies; Chris Chibnall (Note: Some sources refer to Chibnall as a showrunner of the first two series due to his head writer role.)
- Starring: John Barrowman; Eve Myles; Burn Gorman; Naoko Mori; Indira Varma; Gareth David-Lloyd; Freema Agyeman; Kai Owen; Mekhi Phifer; Alexa Havins; Bill Pullman
- Theme music composer: Murray Gold
- Composers: Ben Foster; Murray Gold
- Country of origin: United Kingdom United States (S4)
- Original language: English
- No. of series: 4
- No. of episodes: 41 (list of episodes)

Production
- Executive producers: Russell T Davies; Julie Gardner; Jane Tranter
- Running time: 45–60 minutes
- Production companies: BBC Wales; Canadian Broadcasting Corporation; BBC Worldwide; Starz Entertainment

Original release
- Network: BBC Three
- Release: 22 October 2006 – 21 March 2008
- Network: BBC Two
- Release: 16 January – 4 April 2008
- Network: BBC One
- Release: 6 July 2009 – 15 September 2011
- Network: Starz
- Release: 8 July – 9 September 2011

Related
- Torchwood Declassified; Doctor Who; Whoniverse

Torchwood is a British science fiction television programme created by Russell T Davies. A spin-off of the 2005 revival of Doctor Who, it aired from 2006 to 2011. The show shifted its broadcast channel each series to reflect its growing audience, moving from BBC Three to BBC Two to BBC One, and acquiring American financing in its fourth series when it became a co-production of BBC One and Starz. Torchwood is aimed at adults and older teenagers, in contrast to Doctor Who's target audience of both adults and children. As well as science fiction, the show explores a number of themes, including existentialism, LGBTQ+ identity, and human corruptibility.

Torchwood follows the exploits of a small team of alien-hunters who make up the fictional Cardiff-based Torchwood Institute, which deals mainly with investigating incidents involving extraterrestrials. Its central character is Captain Jack Harkness (John Barrowman), an immortal con man from the distant future; Jack originally appeared in the 2005 series of Doctor Who. The initial main cast of the series consisted of Gareth David-Lloyd, Burn Gorman, Naoko Mori, and Eve Myles. Their characters are specialists for the Torchwood team, often tracking down aliens and defending the planet from alien and human threats. In its first two series, the show uses a time rift in Cardiff as its primary plot generator, accounting for the unusual preponderance of alien beings in Cardiff. In the third and fourth series, Torchwood operate as fugitives. Gorman and Mori's characters were written out of the story at the end of the second series. Recurring actor Kai Owen was promoted to the main cast in series three, in which David-Lloyd was written out. Subsequently, American actors Mekhi Phifer, Alexa Havins and Bill Pullman joined the cast of the show for its fourth series.

The first series premiered on BBC Three and on BBC HD in 2006 to mixed reviews, but viewing figures broke records for the digital channel. It returned in 2008 where it aired first on BBC Two, receiving a higher budget; its uneven tone was largely smoothed out, and the show attracted higher ratings and better reviews. The third series' episodes worked with a higher budget, and it was transferred to the network's flagship channel, BBC One, as a five-episode serial titled Torchwood: Children of Earth. Although Children of Earth was broadcast over a period of five consecutive summer weeknights, the series received high ratings in the United Kingdom and overseas. A fourth series, co-produced by BBC Wales, BBC Worldwide and American premium entertainment network Starz aired in 2011 under the title Torchwood: Miracle Day. Set both in Wales and the United States, Miracle Day fared less well with critics than Children of Earth, although it was applauded by some for its ambition. The series entered an indefinite hiatus after Miracle Day due to Davies' personal circumstances.

All four televised series have been broadcast in Asia, Australia, New Zealand, Europe, and North America. Owing to the early popularity of Torchwood, various tie-in media were produced, including audio dramas, novels, and comic strips. From its inception, the BBC invested in a heavy online presence for the series, with an alternate reality game running alongside the show's first two series, and an animated Web series running alongside its fourth. The BBC continued to approve and commission licensed spin-offs after the show's conclusion, including an audio series continuation from Big Finish Productions (2015–present).

On 21 February 2020, all 41 televised episodes returned to the BBC's online streaming service, BBC iPlayer. In the United States, the entire series was made available on HBO's new streaming service, HBO Max, upon its launch in May 2020 until 26 July 2025.

== Production ==
=== Development ===
Before the revival of Doctor Who, Russell T Davies began to develop an idea for a science fiction/crime drama in the style of American dramas, in particular those created by Joss Whedon like Buffy the Vampire Slayer and Angel. This idea, originally titled Excalibur, was abandoned until 2005, when BBC Three Controller Stuart Murphy invited Davies to develop an after-watershed science fiction series for the channel. During the production of the 2005 series of Doctor Who, the word "Torchwood", an anagram of "Doctor Who", had been used as a title ruse for the series while filming its first few episodes to ensure they were not intercepted. Davies connected the word "Torchwood" to his earlier Excalibur idea and decided to make the series a Doctor Who spin-off. Subsequently, the word "Torchwood" was seeded in Doctor Who episodes and other media that aired in 2005 and 2006.

Because Torchwood is shown after the watershed —that is, after 9 pm —it has more mature content than Doctor Who. Davies told SFX:

We can be a bit more visceral, more violent, and more sexual, if we want to. Though bear in mind that it's very teenage to indulge yourself in blood and gore, and Torchwood is going to be smarter than that. But it's the essential difference between BBC One at 7 pm, and BBC Three at, say, 9 pm. That says it all —instinctively, every viewer can see the huge difference there.

According to Barrowman: "I don't do any nude scenes in Series One; they're saving that for the next series! I don't have a problem with getting my kit off, as long as they pay me the right money." Davies also joked to a BBC Radio Wales interviewer that he was "not allowed" to refer to the programme as "Doctor Who for grown-ups". The first series includes content rarely seen or heard in the Doctor Who franchise, including sex scenes and use of profanity in several episodes.

BBC Three described Torchwood as the centrepiece of its autumn 2006 schedule, and the successful first series led to a second series on BBC Two and a third on BBC One in 2009.

Although Torchwood was originally intended to be sci-fi aimed at adults, the character Captain Jack Harkness, who had previously been introduced in Doctor Who, proved popular with young audiences. Davies decided to create alternative edits of the second series to be "child-friendly", removing overt sexuality and swearing. These edits to the shows enabled it to be broadcast at 7 pm (pre-watershed).

The first three series of Torchwood were produced in-house by BBC Wales. The Head of Drama at the time of the first series, Julie Gardner, served as executive producer alongside Davies. The first two episodes of series 1 of Torchwood premiered on 22 October 2006 on BBC Three and BBC HD. Series 2 premiered on BBC Two and BBC HD on 16 January 2008. The third series, Torchwood: Children of Earth, began shooting on 18 August 2008 and comprised a five-episode mini-series that aired over five consecutive days at 9 pm on BBC One from 6 July 2009, and 9 pm on BBC America HD and BBC America from 20 July 2009. Davies and Gardner stayed on as executive producers and Peter Bennett produced the series.

Davies expressed concern that the third series was aired in a summer evening graveyard slot. Lead actor John Barrowman felt that the show had been mistreated by BBC executives, despite what he felt was the programme's proven popularity and success.

In August 2009, Davies stated that the fourth series was "ready to go", and that he had the next series planned out, stating, "I know exactly how to pick it up. I've got a shape in mind, and I've got stories. I know where you'd find Gwen and Rhys, and their baby, and Jack, and I know how you'd go forward with a new form of Torchwood." At the time, he stated he would prefer for series four to be another mini-series, though he had no qualms about doing another thirteen-episode run. A November 2009 article posted on Eve Myles' website stated that shooting for the fourth series was to begin in January 2011.

Subsequently, Davies looked to American networks to finance future series of the programme. He was turned down by one of the United States' major television networks, Fox; some had speculated the Fox project could have been a spin-off or a reboot. Later, Davies succeeded in striking a deal with American premium cable network Starz. The production of the fourth series was not officially announced until June 2010: a ten-episode mini-series co-produced between BBC Wales, Starz and BBC Worldwide, airing summer 2011.

As with the third, the fourth series was given its own title: Torchwood: Miracle Day. Shortly after the broadcast of Miracle Day in March 2012, the chief executive officer of Starz, Chris Albrecht, announced that he was remaining in touch with the BBC regarding a further series of Torchwood, though it would depend on Davies being free from his other commitments. However, by 2012 the show had entered an indefinite hiatus due to Davies' return to the UK after his partner became ill.

=== Writing ===
In the first series, the main writer alongside Russell T Davies was Chris Chibnall, creator of the BBC light drama shows Born and Bred and future Doctor Who showrunner. Other writers include P.J. Hammond, Toby Whithouse, Doctor Who script editor Helen Raynor, Catherine Tregenna, and Doctor Who cast member Noel Clarke. Of the first two series, Russell T Davies wrote only the premiere episode. Helen Raynor and Brian Minchin were the programme's script editors.

Series one of Torchwood was filmed from May 2006 until November 2006. For the second series, lead writer Chris Chibnall wrote the opening episode and the three final episodes. Both Catherine Tregenna and Helen Raynor wrote two episodes for the second series. The other episodes were written by James Moran, Matt Jones, J. C. Wilsher, Joseph Lidster, P.J. Hammond, and Phil Ford. Russell T Davies was initially announced as writing two episodes, but due to commitments to Doctor Who, he no longer anticipated writing any Torchwood episodes. For series three, Davies returned and wrote the first and last episodes, co-wrote episode three with James Moran and plotted the overall story arc himself. John Fay wrote episodes two and four.

For the fourth series, Miracle Day, Davies secured several popular American television writers, including Buffy the Vampire Slayer writer Jane Espenson; The X-Files, Star Trek: Enterprise and Supernatural writer John Shiban; and House writer Doris Egan. Additionally, both Davies and John Fay returned to write episodes. In continuing the series Davies chose to keep Torchwood more focused on the human condition than its science fiction backdrop. He drew inspiration from Buffy the Vampire Slayer, noting that "the best metaphors in Buffy came down to, 'What's it like to be in high school, as a kid?'" He felt the fourth series of Torchwood to be "about us and our decisions and our lives, and how we live with each other and how we die with each other". The depiction of human nature in the fourth series led to a sequence which many felt to be evocative of the Holocaust. Jane Espenson noted that as a series Torchwood "is willing to go to horrible places". She stated that in storylining Miracle Day, the writers "didn't want to flinch away from what mankind can do."

=== Directing ===
The first block of series two, consisting of episodes by Raynor and Tregenna, was directed by Andy Goddard. Colin Teague directed the second block, which consists of episode two by Moran and episode four by Tregenna, with Ashley Way directing the third block, consisting of the series two premiere by Chibnall and the sixth episode of the series, by JC Wilsher. Euros Lyn directed all five episodes of the third series, Children of Earth.

In June 2010, a BBC News report confirmed that the fourth series would have 10 episodes. Filming began in January 2011. Unlike the previous series, this series' directors did not direct in blocks but in specific episodes. The series four directors included Bharat Nalluri, Billy Gierhart, Guy Ferland and Gwyneth Horder-Payton.

=== Crew ===
Richard Stokes produced series 1 and 2 of Torchwood; Originally, James Hawes (a Doctor Who director) was lined up as the producer, but he later withdrew from this project. Series 3 was produced by Peter Bennett. Series 4 was produced by Kelly A Manners, with UK filming produced by Brian Minchin, producer of Series 4 and 5 of The Sarah Jane Adventures. The series also shares Doctor Who's production designer, Edward Thomas. Music for the series was composed by Ben Foster and Doctor Who's composer Murray Gold, with composer Stu Kennedy assisting on Series 4.

=== Opening sequence ===
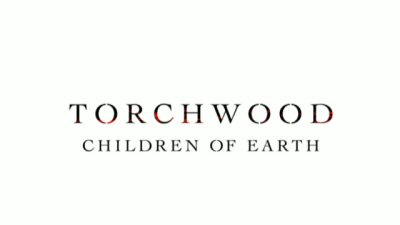
Title card for the Torchwood miniseries, Children of Earth (series 3)

Episodes of the show's first two series are preceded by a voice-over monologue by Barrowman as Harkness, establishing the show's premise. The show's theme tune plays over this monologue and the title sequence. The theme was written by Doctor Who composer Murray Gold.

The opening sequence was re-done specifically for series 2, episode 5 "Adam", adding the titular character to the existing scenes. This reflected the in-universe story of Adam psychically inserting himself into the team members' memories as a long-standing member of the team.

For Children of Earth, a recap of the last episode was played at the beginning of each episode, followed by a title card. The theme was not featured in this, instead only featuring over the end credits.

A new theme arrangement and opening credit sequence was introduced with Series 4 (though a musical motif, or "sting", from the original theme is still audible in numerous scenes). Although each episode of Miracle Day has a published individual title, Torchwood: Miracle Day is the only on-screen title used.

== Overview ==
The series is set in Cardiff, Wales, and follows a rogue covert agency called Torchwood which investigates extraterrestrial incidents on Earth and scavenges alien technology for its own use. This Torchwood, led by Captain Jack Harkness, is a small, independent organisation, but began as the Cardiff branch of the larger Torchwood Institute, then-defunct, which began in the Victorian era. (Its origins were outlined in the Doctor Who episode "Tooth and Claw", and Harkness's long connection to it is covered in flashback scenes in a Torchwood series 2 episode.) As the opening monologue explains, the organisation is separate from the government, outside the police, and beyond the United Nations. Their public perception is as merely a 'special ops' group. The events of the first series take place sometime after the Doctor Who series two finale, in which the Torchwood Institute's London headquarters was destroyed. This format was maintained for the first two series.

Series three, a miniseries, saw the Cardiff headquarters destroyed and the team temporarily operating as fugitives in England's capital city of London, its membership declining and the organisation thoroughly broken over the course of the serial. Series four starts with Torchwood fully disbanded. Jack has left Earth after the events of series three, and a pregnant Gwen has retired to be with her family. The group is then unofficially reformed, this time operating primarily in the United States, joined by two fugitive CIA agents who have been framed for treason, during Miracle Day.

== Cast ==
Series two cast, including Freema Agyeman as Martha Jones

| Actor | Character | Series | | | |
| Actor | Character | 1 | 2 | 3 | 4 |
|---|---|---|---|---|---|
| John Barrowman | Jack Harkness | Main | Main | Main | Main |
| Eve Myles | Gwen Cooper | Main | Main | Main | Main |
| Burn Gorman | Owen Harper | Main | Main | | |
| Naoko Mori | Toshiko Sato | Main | Main | | |
| Indira Varma | Suzie Costello | Main (Note: Indira Varma was billed as a main character only in the first episode. She later appears in "They Keep Killing Suzie" with guest star billing.) | | | |
| Gareth David-Lloyd | Ianto Jones | Main | Main | Main | |
| Freema Agyeman | Martha Jones | | Main (Note: Freema Agyeman was billed as a main character in the Series 2 episodes "Reset", "Dead Man Walking" and "A Day in the Death".) | | |
| Kai Owen | Rhys Williams | Recurring | Recurring | Main | Main |
| Mekhi Phifer | Rex Matheson | | | | Main |
| Alexa Havins | Esther Drummond | | | | Main |
| Bill Pullman | Oswald Danes | | | | Main |

Unlike its parent programme, Torchwood centres on a team instead of a single character with companions. The show initially depicts a small team of alien-hunters known as Torchwood Three, based in Cardiff. The team is made up of five operatives led by Captain Jack Harkness (John Barrowman), formerly a time-traveling "Time Agent" and con man from the distant future who has lived on Earth as an immortal since the 19th century. Gwen Cooper (Eve Myles), the female lead, joins the team in the first episode; she is originally an audience surrogate, but later grows into a more morally complicated character. The original cast is filled out by Torchwood medical officer Owen Harper (Burn Gorman), computer specialist Toshiko Sato (Naoko Mori), and general factotum-cum-administrator Ianto Jones (Gareth David-Lloyd). Toshiko and Owen are killed off in the second series finale, as is Ianto in the show's third series. Recurring characters are Rhys Williams (Kai Owen), Gwen's live-in boyfriend and later husband; and Andy Davidson (Tom Price), Gwen's former police partner. Kai Owen becomes a main cast member in the programme beginning with the third series; his character is initially unaware of Gwen's activities with Torchwood but later becomes her close confidant and the team's ally. Price appears in all four series.

Prior to the programme's debut, publicity materials featured Indira Varma as Suzie Costello among the regular cast members, giving the impression that she would appear throughout the series. However, Suzie was killed off at the end of the first episode with Gwen taking her place on the team, Suzie reappearing only once more as an antagonist. In the first two series, Paul Kasey regularly appears under heavy prosthetics, portraying, as in Doctor Who, a number of aliens on the series, such as humanoid Weevils and Blowfishes. Other recurring characters include Doctor Who's Martha Jones (Freema Agyeman)—like Jack, a former time-traveller, and now medical officer for the militaristic alien-investigating organisation UNIT—who crosses over into Torchwood for three episodes in series two. Additionally, James Marsters portrays Captain John Hart, Jack's villainous former lover and Time Agent partner. Others in the second series, recurring in a minor capacity, include a mysteriously age-immune little girl (Skye Bennett) and Victorian-era Torchwood member Alice Guppy (Amy Manson). The second series also introduces Gwen's parents, Geraint (William Thomas) and Mary Cooper (Sharon Morgan), who later reappear in the show's fourth series.

Children of Earth featured a largely new supporting cast for the duration of the five-episode serial, such as Permanent Secretary John Frobisher (Peter Capaldi), Clem McDonald (Paul Copley), Frobisher's personal assistant Bridget Spears (Susan Brown), Prime Minister Brian Green (Nicholas Farrell), ruthless operative Agent Johnson (Liz May Brice), Jack's middle-aged daughter Alice (Lucy Cohu), her son Steven (Bear McCausland) and Ianto's sister Rhiannon (Katy Wix). Cush Jumbo was cast as Frobisher's personal assistant Lois Habiba; Habiba was written into the story after Agyeman was unavailable to return to portray Martha.

The fourth series, Miracle Day, features an expanded cast of eight. Barrowman, Myles and Owen all return to the series. New to the Torchwood team are CIA agents Rex Matheson (Mekhi Phifer), and Esther Drummond (Alexa Havins), and surgeon Vera Juarez (Arlene Tur). American film star Bill Pullman joins as Oswald Danes, a highly intelligent child murderer, and Lauren Ambrose plays Jilly Kitzinger, a ruthless PR woman who takes on Danes as a client. Tur's character is killed off in the fifth episode, whilst Pullman and Havins last until episode ten. Recurring characters include CIA directors Brian Friedkin (Wayne Knight) and Allen Shapiro (John de Lancie), San Pedro camp manager Colin Maloney (Marc Vann), Esther's sister Sarah Drummond (Candace Brown), and CIA watch analysts Charlotte Willis (Marina Benedict) and Noah Vickers (Paul James). Nana Visitor plays Olivia Colasanto, who directs the team toward their real enemies; Frances Fisher and Teddy Sears portray recurring villains.

== Episodes ==
Series overview of Torchwood.
| Series | Episodes | Originally released (UK) | | | Average viewers (millions) |
| Series | Episodes | First released | Last released | Network | Average viewers (millions) |
|---|---|---|---|---|---|
| 1 | 13 | 22 October 2006 | 1 January 2007 | BBC Three | 1.42 |
| 2 | 13 | 16 January 2008 | 4 April 2008 | BBC Two (Note: Episodes 6–12 were first broadcast on BBC Three one week earlier than the date listed in the table, with the exception of episode 11, which first aired on BBC Three two days prior.) | 3.27 |
| 3: Children of Earth | 5 | 6 July 2009 | 10 July 2009 | BBC One | 6.47 |
| 4: Miracle Day | 10 | 14 July 2011 (Note: The Starz broadcast of this series began and concluded six days before the UK dates listed.) | 15 September 2011 | Starz / BBC One | 5.17 |

The premiere episode "Everything Changes" was written by Russell T Davies and introduces the main characters and roles within the series, using newcomer Gwen as the audience surrogate in a similar style to the introduction of the companion characters in Doctor Who. The second episode, titled "Day One", aired immediately after the first. It continues Gwen's neophyte role and includes a "sex monster" science fiction storyline. The first 13-episode series ended with a two-parter on 1 January 2007. The first part, entitled "Captain Jack Harkness", is a love story set in wartime Britain, with a subplot which pushes the setting toward an apocalypse for the finale "End of Days". It deals with the ramifications of diseases and persons from throughout history falling through time and across the universe to arrive in present day Cardiff. The episode also sets up Jack's return in the Doctor Who episode "Utopia".

2008's second 13-episode series of Torchwood begins with Jack's return from the previous Doctor Who episode "Last of the Time Lords" with the series premiere "Kiss Kiss, Bang Bang". The series introduces Jack's ex-partner Captain John Hart in its premiere, reveals flashbacks to Jack's childhood in "Adam" and shows how each member joined Torchwood in the penultimate episode "Fragments". A three-episode arc ("Reset", "Dead Man Walking" and "A Day in the Death") in the middle of the series guest stars Doctor Who actress Freema Agyeman as Martha Jones, temporarily drafted into Torchwood. The arc focuses on the death and partial resurrection of main character Owen Harper, and how he copes as a dead man. The second series finale, "Exit Wounds", features the departures of main characters Owen and Tosh, whose deaths at the hands of Jack's long-lost brother Gray reduced the cast to Barrowman, Myles and David-Lloyd in its closing scenes. The Torchwood Three team made a crossover appearance in the series four finale of Doctor Who, "The Stolen Earth"/"Journey's End", which featured Jack Harkness leaving the Doctor at the close of the story, accompanied by Martha Jones and Mickey Smith (Noel Clarke).

Series three is only five episodes long and was broadcast over consecutive nights as a single story, Children of Earth (2009). The series focuses on the consequences of appeasement policy; having been given twelve children as a tribute in 1965, aliens called the 4-5-6 arrive in the present demanding a greater share of the Earth's child population. For the first time in the series, the majority of the action takes place outside Wales; Torchwood's base of operations is destroyed in the premiere and the remainder of the Torchwood team have relocated to London. Kai Owen is promoted to a regular cast member, while a new cast of political figures are introduced alongside family members of main characters Jack and Ianto. Nicholas Farrell plays Prime Minister Brian Green whose intent is to give in rather than fight the 4-5-6, leaving Torchwood to stand against the government and the aliens. David-Lloyd departs the cast when Ianto is killed by the aliens in episode four, leaving Jack distraught. In the series closing scenes, with Gwen pregnant and Jack abandoning Earth, Torchwood effectively disbands.

Series four, Torchwood: Miracle Day (2011), comprising ten episodes, sees Torchwood having been reduced to the status of legend following Children of Earth. The narrative follows two CIA agents (Mekhi Phifer and Alexa Havins) who discover Torchwood on the same day death ceases to occur, due to an event known as Miracle Day. The agents join Gwen and Jack as they seek to restore death to the world. While primarily a conspiracy thriller, the series also examines the depths humanity can sink to under pressure. Actress Arlene Tur portrays a surgeon who challenges the failing medical system and shifting government legislation. The characters of Oswald Danes (Bill Pullman) and Jilly Kitzinger (Lauren Ambrose) are used to highlight the precariousness of fame and the amorality of the media. The Great Recession is implicated as another element of the Miracle Day conspiracy. Though largely set in the US, Wales remains a key setting. The origins of the Miracle Day conspiracy are revealed in a 1920s flashback in "Immortal Sins", as the worldwide scale of the story takes the protagonists to Shanghai and Buenos Aires in the finale "The Blood Line". In the epilogue, Gwen questions Jack whether he will stay to reform Torchwood; he does not provide an answer.

== Setting ==
"With Doctor Who we often had to pretend that bits of Cardiff were London, or Utah, or the planet Zog. Whereas this series is going to be honest-to-God Cardiff. We will happily walk past the Millennium Centre and say, 'Look, there's the Millennium Centre'."

— Russell T Davies

The first two series of Torchwood were both filmed and set in Cardiff. The makers of Torchwood deliberately portray Cardiff as a modern urban centre, contrasting with past stereotypical portrayals of Wales. "There's not a male-voice choir [...] or a miner in sight." said BBC Wales Controller Menna Richards. Conservative MP Michael Gove described the debut of Torchwood as the moment confirming "Wales' move from overlooked Celtic cousin to underwired erotic coquette". Filming has also taken place outside of Cardiff, including in Merthyr Tydfil.

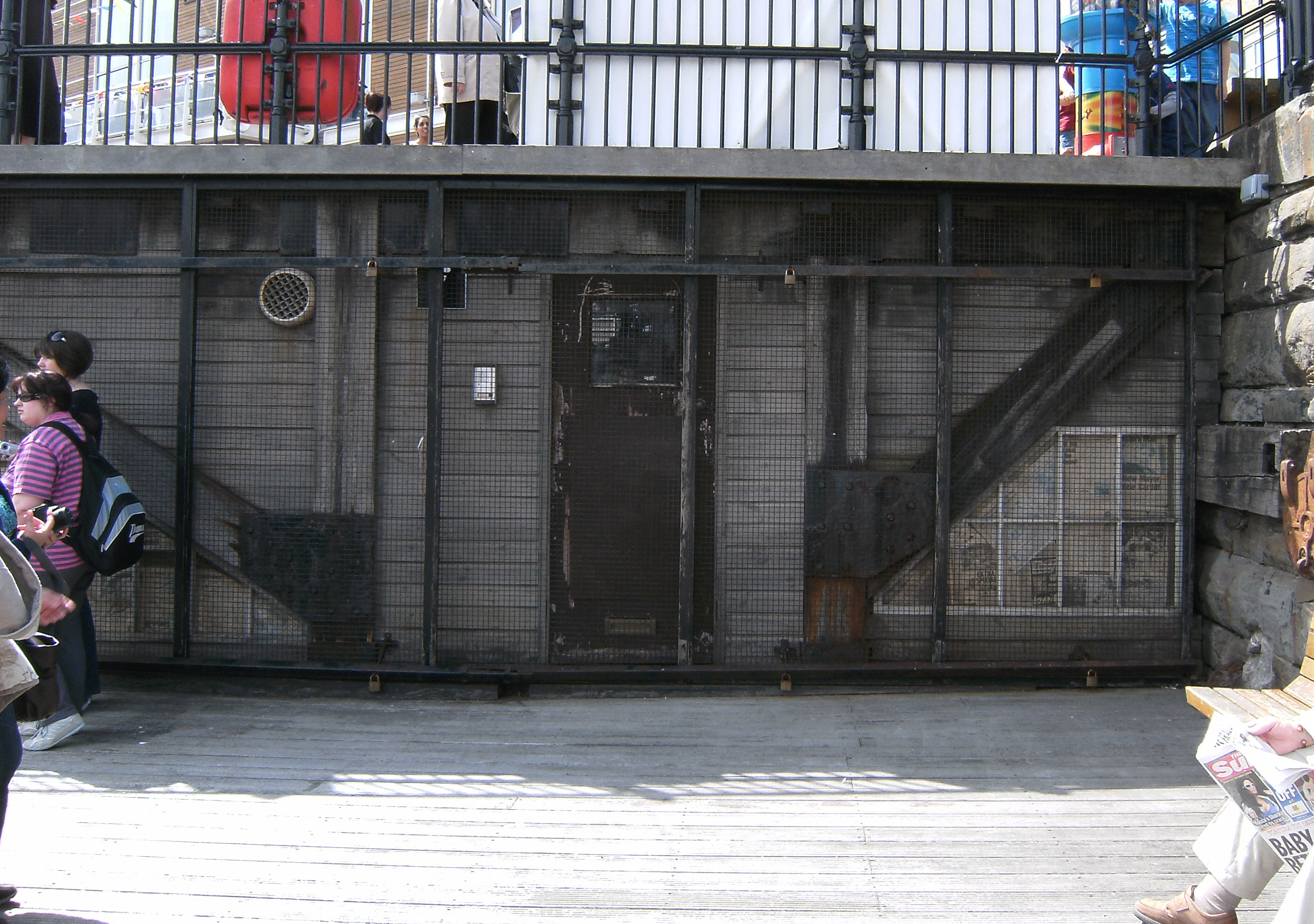
"The Hub" connects Roald Dahl Plass and is underneath the Mermaid Quay shopping complex.

The team's headquarters during the first two series, referred to as the Hub, was beneath Roald Dahl Plass in Cardiff Bay—formerly known as the Oval Basin. This is where the TARDIS landed in the Doctor Who episodes "Boom Town" and "Utopia" to refuel, and is the location of the spacetime rift first seen in "The Unquiet Dead". The Cardiff Rift becomes "the first of several phenomena or technologies in the new Dr. Who associated with the interface between different places, dimensions, or states of being." The Rift becomes a plot device to present threats to the characters and the world, with danger awaiting on the other side. In "The House of the Dead" the Cardiff Rift is closed through the actions of a ghost, Ianto Jones.

The Hub itself was around three storeys high, with a large column running through the middle that was an extension of the fountain above; at its base lay the rift machine. The Hub had two means of access: a lift that rose to the plass next to the fountain (camouflaged by a perception filter), and a more mundane entrance hidden in a tourism office. Production crew were keen to use everything Wales had to offer in filming the series; for example, the military base scenes in "Sleeper" and the booby-trapped abandoned warehouse scenes in "Fragments" were filmed at RAF Caerwent, near Chepstow.

The third series opened in the traditional setting, but in the first episode the Hub was destroyed; the show adapted to a conventional London setting, with many scenes filmed and set at real-life British intelligence agency headquarters Thames House. For the show's fourth series, the programme was largely filmed and set in the United States, but parts were filmed in Wales and other locations.

== Spin-offs ==
=== Companion programme ===
Torchwood Declassified
- Country of origin: United Kingdom
- Original language: English
- No. of series: 4
- No. of episodes: 29 (list of episodes)

Production
- Running time: 10 minutes (series 1–2); 30 minutes (series 3); 15–30 minutes (series 4)

Original release
- Network: BBC Three
- Release: 19 October 2006 – 1 January 2007
- Network: BBC Two
- Release: 23 January – 4 April 2008
- Network: Direct-to-video
- Release: 13 July 2009 – 14 November 2011

Related
- Doctor Who Confidential

Torchwood Declassified is a "making-of" programme similar to Doctor Who Confidential. Each Declassified episode runs under ten minutes, in contrast to Confidential's 45 (formerly 30). Torchwood Declassified aired on BBC Three (series 1) and BBC Two (series 2), and was also available online through the BBC's iPlayer and dedicated Torchwood site. Instalments were produced for each episode of the first two series, with a single instalment produced for the Children of Earth DVD release.

==== Episodes ====
| Series | Episodes | Originally released | | |
| Series | Episodes | First released | Last released | Network |
|---|---|---|---|---|
| 1 | 13 | 19 October 2006 | 1 January 2007 | BBC Three |
| 2 | 13 | 23 January 2008 | 4 April 2008 | BBC Two |
| 3 | 1 | 13 July 2009 | | Direct-to-video |
| 4 | 2 | 14 November 2011 | | Direct-to-video |

=== Companion magazine ===
In 2007, Titan Magazines launched Torchwood Magazine, which was released on 24 January 2008 in the United Kingdom. The United States version was launched in February 2008. The Australia/New Zealand version was launched in April 2008. The magazine emulated Doctor Who Magazine in combining behind-the-scenes features with original story content in the form of a serialised comic strip and short stories; as the magazine's run progressed, the original fiction became more predominant. The magazine was discontinued in early 2011, after two-dozen issues.

Titan published six issues of a monthly Torchwood comic book in 2009 for North American markets; the comic consisted of reprints of the magazine's comic strips and short stories and was cancelled in the wake of the parent publication folding. Following the cancellation of Torchwood Magazine, Doctor Who Magazine and its American counterpart, Doctor Who Insider, ran articles on the series.

=== Electronic literature, webcasts, web series ===
Torchwood has "a heavy online presence". At the Edinburgh International Television Festival, BBC Director of Television Jana Bennett originally promised that the series' online tie-ins were to include the ability to explore the Hub, an imaginary desktop, weekly 10-minute behind-the-scenes vodcasts. "You can join the corporation of Torchwood and be one of its employees," said Bennett. The Adobe Flash-based interactive website, including the Hub Tour, debuted on 12 October 2006. Due to digital media rights restrictions most video content on the BBC Three websites is only accessible to users within the UK.

Torchwood's many tie-in websites amount to an alternate reality game; the show's online presence was an example of electronic literature. On the first website (for series 1), the alternate reality game was mostly composed of weekly updates to the site in the form of fictional intercepted blogs, newspaper cutouts and confidential letters and IM conversations between members of the Torchwood Three crew. Convergence: the International Journal of Research into New Media commented on Doctor Who and Torchwood's foray into "convergence culture" as an achievement "on an unprecedented scale, with the BBC currently using the series to trial a plethora of new technologies, including: mini-episodes on mobile phones, podcast commentaries, interactive red-button adventures, video blogs, companion programming, and 'fake' metatextual websites." For the second series in 2008, a second interactive Torchwood online game was devised, scripted by series writer Phil Ford; this more heavily featured the actors of the series, particularly Gareth David-Lloyd, and Siwan Morris was cast as a pirate radio jockey investigating Torchwood.

During the fourth series of the revival of Doctor Who, a crossover webcast production called Captain Jack's Monster Files was launched, featuring Barrowman, in character as Jack, hosting a series of shorts profiling various monsters and aliens featured on Doctor Who. These segments, posted to the BBC's official Doctor Who website, included specially shot footage of Jack in the Hub. After Series 4, the segments were produced less frequently, with the last featuring Jack, released in December 2009, taking the form of Jack narrating a mini-episode featuring the Weeping Angels entitled "A Ghost Story for Christmas". Subsequent Monster Files webcasts released since 2010 have been hosted by Doctor Who co-star Alex Kingston as her character, River Song. As with most other online video content from the BBC, Captain Jack's Monster Files are not viewable outside the UK and to date (2011) have never been included on a DVD or Blu-ray release of either Doctor Who or Torchwood. The Torchwood Archives by Gary Russell collects much of this online literature for the first two series in hardback form, including the Captain's Blog section of the BBC America Torchwood website.

To promote its rebroadcasts of Torchwood, the British digital channel Watch has twice commissioned the creative team of the Torchwood Magazine comic strip to produce brief online-exclusive comic strip stories for the Watch website. The first of these, The Return of the Vostok, was uploaded in February 2009, with a follow-up, Ma and Par, appearing in February 2010.

Tying in with the launch of Torchwood: Miracle Day, Starz produced a 2011 Torchwood webseries entitled Torchwood: Web of Lies, which starred American actress Eliza Dushku.

=== Radio plays ===
Set between the end of Series 2 and the beginning of Series 3, the BBC aired four Torchwood radio dramas featuring the cast of the series. As a tie in with Radio 4's CERN-themed day on 10 September 2008, a CERN-themed radio episode of Torchwood written by Joseph Lidster, entitled "Lost Souls", aired as the day's Afternoon Play. This was the first Torchwood drama not to feature Burn Gorman and Naoko Mori. Three further episodes were broadcast on 1–3 July 2009: "Asylum", "Golden Age", and "The Dead Line".

In May 2011, the BBC Radio Drama newsletter announced that a further three Torchwood radio plays had entered production. The new plays, titled "Torchwood: The Lost Files", Part 1: "The Devil and Miss Carew", Part 2: "Submission", and Part 3: "The House of the Dead" were broadcast on 11, 12, and 13 July 2011 in the Afternoon Play slot at 14.15 BST and were available to listen to in the iPlayer for one week after the broadcast. (By 2019 the BBC made radio dramas available on demand for one month to one year; about 25 radio plays were usually available) While "The Devil and Miss Carew" and "Submission" were set before "Children of Earth" with Gareth David-Lloyd reprising the role of Ianto, "The House of the Dead" on the other hand was set an unspecified time after Children of Earth and saw the return of Ianto as a ghost.

In January 2015, Barrowman stated that Torchwood would return, for the first time since Miracle Day, in the form of several BBC radio plays.

=== Novels and audiobooks ===
Accompanying the main series of Torchwood are a series of novels. The books are published in paperback-sized hardcover format, the same format BBC Books uses for its New Series Adventures line for Doctor Who. The first three novels were later released, abridged, as audiobooks, along with other audiobook that have not been novels. To date all of the core cast members from the first two series have narrated at least one abridged or audio-exclusive reading.

=== Big Finish ===
On 3 May 2015, it was announced that Big Finish Productions would produce a series of six Torchwood audio adventures starring John Barrowman as Jack. The new series of audio dramas will each focus on different members of the Torchwood team, exploring the impact that a mysterious event has on them, taking place at various times in and around the TV episodes. Starting off the range was John Barrowman, who stars in The Conspiracy by David Llewellyn, which was released September 2015.

Big Finish later released shows billed as a continuation of Torchwood, or "series five", featuring a regular cast of nine. Barrowman, Myles, Owen, and Price returned to voice their characters. New to the series were civil servant St John Colchester (Paul Clayton), Ng (Alexandria Riley), news reporter Tyler Steele (Jonny Green), shapeshifting alien Orr (Samantha Béart), and a parallel-universe version of Yvonne Hartman (Tracy-Ann Oberman).

=== Original soundtrack ===
Torchwood: Original Television Soundtrack

Soundtrack album by Ben Foster, Murray Gold and the BBC National Orchestra of Wales
- Released: 5 August 2008 (download); 22 September 2008
- Recorded: 2006–2008
- Genre: Soundtrack
- Length: 78:35
- Label: Silva Screen Records
- Producer: Ben Foster

Torchwood soundtrack chronology
| Torchwood: Original Television Soundtrack (2008) | Torchwood: Children of Earth (2009) |

Professional ratings
Review scores
| Source | Rating |
|---|---|
| AllMusic | 3.5/5 stars |

The soundtrack album which was released on 22 September 2008, containing 32 tracks of incidental music composed by Ben Foster and Murray Gold and used in the first and second series.

Ahead of the CD release, the album became available for download on the American iTunes Store on 5 August 2008, and on the Silva Screen website on 8 August 2008.

==== Track listing ====
| No. | Title | Length |
|---|---|---|
| 1. | "Everything Changes" | 1:22 |
| 2. | "The Chase" | 3:26 |
| 3. | "Ghosts" | 1:58 |
| 4. | "Sleepers, Awake!" | 1:12 |
| 5. | "Toshiko & Tommy" | 3:05 |
| 6. | "Into the Hub" | 2:05 |
| 7. | "The Mission" | 2:32 |
| 8. | "Gray's Theme" | 2:41 |
| 9. | "Jack's Love Theme" | 1:50 |
| 10. | "Another Day, Another Death" | 2:45 |
| 11. | "Look Right, Then Leave" | 2:48 |
| 12. | "Welcome to Planet Earth" | 1:51 |
| 13. | "The Plot" | 3:21 |
| 14. | "Out of Time" | 1:27 |
| 15. | "The Death of Dr. Owen Harper" | 2:11 |
| 16. | "King of the Weevils" | 4:09 |
| 17. | "Owen Fights Death" | 1:50 |
| 18. | "The Woman on the Roof" | 2:22 |
| 19. | "Owen's Theme" | 3:10 |
| 20. | "Pearl & the Ghostmaker" | 2:24 |
| 21. | "Flat Holm Island" | 2:08 |
| 22. | "A Boy Called Jonah" | 4:53 |
| 23. | "Toshiko Sato – Betrayal and Redemption" | 3:46 |
| 24. | "Gwen & Rhys" | 1:14 |
| 25. | "Jack Joins Torchwood" | 1:34 |
| 26. | "Captain Jack's Theme" | 3:16 |
| 27. | "I Believe in Him" | 1:31 |
| 28. | "Memories of Gray" | 2:29 |
| 29. | "Goodbyes" | 2:20 |
| 30. | "Death of Toshiko" | 2:19 |
| 31. | "The End Is Where We Start From" | 2:24 |
| 32. | "Torchwood Theme" | 1:46 |

== Reception ==
=== Critical reception ===
As a spin-off of long-running British cultural artefact Doctor Who, Torchwood's launch into British popular culture has received many positive and negative reviews, commentary and parody following the hype of its inception, especially regarding its status as an "adult" Doctor Who spin-off as well as its characterisation and portrayal of sex. Reviews for the first series were largely negative, with sites such as Behind the Sofa giving many more negative reviews than positive ones. Reviews of the second series were more positive. The third series, which took the form of a five-part story arc with the blanket title of Children of Earth, received a number of positive reviews. Critics described it separately as a "powerful human drama"; "Best. Torchwood. Ever."; and "against all expectations, a work of Proper Drama". Conversely, The Daily Mirror gave the mini-series a negative review, describing it as "the modern-day Blake's 7: ludicrous plot, hammy acting, an adolescent penchant for 'Issues'". Metacritic, an American review aggregator website, gives Torchwood series one a rating of 73 out of 100, indicating "generally favourable reviews". The show's second series rates above the first, scoring an aggregated 80 out of 100. The third series rated higher, at 81, indicating "universal acclaim". Its highest scores were a 100 from TV Guide and a 91 from TIME; the lowest was a 60 from The New York Times. The fourth series had an average rating of 70, based on 24 critics.

The death of character Ianto Jones in Children of Earth triggered protests from fans of the show, among them the "Save Ianto Jones" campaign which collected more than £10,000 for the British Children in Need annual charity event. Other fans resorted to abuse and threats, causing writer James Moran to fire off an angry missive in a blog post. Showrunner Russell T Davies made no apologies for the decision to kill off the character, saying, "I'm just delighted that the fans are so wrapped in the character to have that reaction". The plot point attracted more controversy from some commentators, additionally, because it depicted the death of a main character involved in a same-sex relationship. This led several writers to analyse the death in view of the character's earlier refusal to admit to his relationship with a man, and claimed that the death was a sign that the LGBT community was leaving behind its image of victimhood.

Positive and negative attention has been given to the portrayal of same-sex relationships in Torchwood. Maria Boyd of the University of Texas at Austin published her paper at a conference, "Gay Sex and Aliens! How the Press frames Russell T Davies' Torchwood". She argues through "a discourse analysis of 109 reviews of the Series 1 and Series 2 premiere episodes" how "TV critics are more concerned with the depictions of bisexuality among the principal characters on Torchwood." Furthermore, she argues that the show's reviews "highlight the same-sex interactions depicted on the show utilising sensationalist, assimilationist, or condemnatory language" and that the "hegemonic, heterosexist language used by TV critics covering Torchwood has framed the program in such a way that it limits audience's ability to make meaning of the text themselves."

=== In other works ===
Although fewer in number than Doctor Who spoofs, there have been a number of parodies of Torchwood in various media. Verity Stob, a technology columnist for online newspaper The Register, wrote a parody of Torchwood called Under Torch Wood. The piece is in the style of Under Milk Wood, a Dylan Thomas radio play. The piece comments on the level of swearing present in Torchwood and the role of Rhys Williams, whom the piece describes as "Barry Backstory". In its third series, the Doctor Who parody Nebulous also began to parody Torchwood, with references to "baby dinosaurs falling through a hole in time" and "the sheer amount of paranormal activity in the Cardiff area alone ... starting to threaten the Earth's plausibility shield".

Satirical impressionist television series Dead Ringers also parodied Torchwood, with Jon Culshaw playing Captain Jack and Jan Ravens as Gwen Cooper. The sketches parodied the level of sex in Torchwood, claiming "we never deal with an alien unless at least one [of the team] has shagged it", and describing the lack of motivations of the characters. It also parodies the bisexuality of the characters and the melodramatic personality of Jack, who in the sketch walks extremely dramatically, swinging his coat about himself. Barrowman is described as a "pound shop Tom Cruise", and reference is made to the perceived low-budget of the show, with Owen describing the Torchwood equipment as "an Apple Mac with stickers on the case". Later spoofs in the final episode of the 2007 series of Dead Ringers featured Jack Harkness in a threesome with two Attack of the Cybermen-era Cybermen, and an elderly version called Driftwood, which claims to be "separate from the Post Office, beyond the bingo hall and outside the Oxfam", a parody of Torchwood's opening narration. It also featured Albert Steptoe of Steptoe and Son as the leader of the team, claiming "a terrible event in my past means that I can't die. It's called UK Gold", and parodied its use of amnesia pills (unnecessary for this team due to the onset of senile amnesia).

=== Ratings ===
The first episodes of Torchwood on BBC Three gave the channel its highest-ever ratings and the highest ratings of any digital-only non-sports channel at the time with 2.519 million viewers (though this has since been surpassed by Bionic Woman on ITV2, which gained 2.553 million in March 2008). The audience share was 12.7%, increasing to 13.8% for the second episode (shown immediately after the first episode on the same day), despite viewership dropping to 2.498 million.

Ratings for later episodes dropped to around 1.1 to 1.2 million viewers during the first showing on BBC Three (the lowest being 0.8 million for week ending 24 December 2006), but nevertheless, the show remained the most-viewed programme on BBC Three by a wide margin. Viewing figures for the repeat screenings on BBC Two later the same week were around 2.2 to 2.3 million (dropping to under 1.1 and 1.8 respectively for the weeks ending 03/12/06 and 10/12/06).

For its second series, which began in January 2008, Torchwood was moved to the more established channel BBC Two. Again, initial ratings were respectable, and the first episode garnered 4.22 million viewers. However, the series again began to decline and had lost a million viewers by its fourth episode. It dropped to a low of 2.52 million viewers towards the end of its run, even after the BBC had moved it from its usual Wednesday-night slot (where it was being consistently beaten by ITV's programming and Channel 4's number-one series, Grand Designs) to Friday nights. The second series had an overall average rating of 3.26 million viewers on BBC Two.

Torchwood's five-part third series, entitled Children of Earth, premiered on BBC One in July 2009, with an estimated 5.9 million viewers, according to overnight figures. Ratings for the second episode dropped to 5.58m, but rose to a high of 6.24m for the fourth episode. According to the overnight figures, the mini-series garnered an average rating of 5.88 million viewers. According to official figures, published by Broadcasters' Audience Research Board (BARB), all five episodes of the mini-series garnered more than 6 million viewers, with the fourth episode gaining the largest audience.

The first episode of series four, Miracle Day, attracted a consolidated audience of 6.59 million, which was slightly higher than the figure for the opening episode of the previous series, as well as an AI rating of 85 out of 100, considered "excellent". However, viewing figures steadily declined as the series continued, dropping to a low of 4.48 for the seventh episode, though figures picked up slightly with 4.85 million viewers for the final episode.

=== Awards ===
Award nominations for Torchwood
| Award | Year | Category | Nominee(s) | Episode | Result | Ref. |
|---|---|---|---|---|---|---|
| Airlock Alpha Portal Awards | 2010 | Best Actress – Television | Eve Myles | —N/a | Won | |
| Airlock Alpha Portal Awards | 2010 | Best Actor – Television | John Barrowman | —N/a | Nominated | |
| Airlock Alpha Portal Awards | 2010 | Best Series – Television | Torchwood | —N/a | Nominated | |
| Airlock Alpha Portal Awards | 2010 | Best Episode – Television | Torchwood: Children of Earth | | Nominated | |
| ASTRA Awards | 2012 | Favourite Program – International Drama | Torchwood: Miracle Day | —N/a | Nominated | |
| BAFTA Cymru Awards | 2007 | Best Drama Series/Serial | Richard Stokes | "Everything Changes" | Won | |
| BAFTA Cymru Awards | 2007 | Best Actress | Eve Myles | "Everything Changes" | Won | |
| BAFTA Cymru Awards | 2007 | Best Director of Photography – Drama | Mark Waters | "Everything Changes" | Won | |
| BAFTA Cymru Awards | 2007 | Best Design | Edward Thomas | "Everything Changes" | Won | |
| BAFTA Cymru Awards | 2007 | Best Actor | John Barrowman | "Everything Changes" | Nominated | |
| BAFTA Cymru Awards | 2007 | Best Sound | Team Torchwood | "Everything Changes" | Nominated | |
| BAFTA Cymru Awards | 2007 | Best Make Up | Marie Doris | "They Keep Killing Suzie" | Nominated | |
| BAFTA Cymru Awards | 2007 | Best Original Music Soundtrack | Murray Gold | "Out of Time" | Nominated | |
| BAFTA Cymru Awards | 2008 | Best Costume | Ray Holman | "Captain Jack Harkness" | Won | |
| BAFTA Cymru Awards | 2008 | Best Drama Series/Serial | Richard Stokes | "End of Days" | Nominated | |
| BAFTA Cymru Awards | 2008 | Best Actress | Eve Myles | "End of Days" | Nominated | |
| BAFTA Cymru Awards | 2008 | Best Original Music Soundtrack | Ben Foster | "End of Days" | Nominated | |
| BAFTA Cymru Awards | 2009 | Best Costume | Ray Holman | "From Out of the Rain" | Nominated | |
| BAFTA Cymru Awards | 2009 | Best Design | Edward Thomas | "Adrift" | Nominated | |
| BAFTA Cymru Awards | 2010 | Best Drama Series/Serial | Peter Bennett | "Children of Earth: Day One" | Won | |
| BAFTA Cymru Awards | 2010 | Best Editor | Will Oswald | "Children of Earth: Day One" | Won | |
| BAFTA Cymru Awards | 2010 | Best Actress | Eve Myles | "Children of Earth: Day One" | Nominated | |
| BAFTA Cymru Awards | 2010 | Best Screenwriter | Russell T Davies | "Children of Earth: Day One" | Nominated | |
| BAFTA Cymru Awards | 2010 | Best Original Music Soundtrack | Ben Foster | "Children of Earth: Day One" | Nominated | |
| BAFTA Cymru Awards | 2010 | Best Sound | Howard Eaves, Julian Howarth, Tim Ricketts, Doug Sinclair | "Children of Earth: Day One" | Nominated | |
| BAFTA Cymru Awards | 2010 | Best Costume | Ray Holman | "Children of Earth: Day One" | Nominated | |
| Celtic Media Festival Awards | 2010 | Best Drama Series | Torchwood: Children of Earth | | Won | |
| Constellation Awards | 2008 | Outstanding Canadian Contribution to Science Fiction Film or Television in 2007 | Torchwood | —N/a | Nominated | |
| Constellation Awards | 2008 | Best Female Performance in a 2007 Science Fiction Television Episode | Naoko Mori | "Greeks Bearing Gifts" | Nominated | |
| Constellation Awards | 2010 | Best Male Performance in a 2009 Science Fiction Television Episode | Gareth David-Lloyd | "Children of Earth: Day Four" | Nominated | |
| GLAAD Media Awards | 2009 | Outstanding Drama Series | Torchwood | —N/a | Nominated | |
| GLAAD Media Awards | 2010 | Outstanding TV Movie or Limited Series | Torchwood: Children of Earth | | Nominated | |
| GLAAD Media Awards | 2012 | Outstanding Drama Series | Torchwood: Miracle Day | —N/a | Nominated | |
| Hugo Awards | 2008 | Best Dramatic Presentation, Short Form | Catherine Tregenna | "Captain Jack Harkness" | Nominated | |
| National Television Awards | 2012 | Outstanding Drama Performance (Male) | John Barrowman | —N/a | Nominated | |
| National Television Awards | 2012 | Outstanding Drama Performance (Female) | Eve Myles | —N/a | Nominated | |
| National Television Awards | 2012 | Most Popular Drama | Torchwood | —N/a | Longlisted | |
| NewNowNext Awards | 2008 | Best Kiss | Jack (John Barrowman) and Ianto (Gareth David-Lloyd) | Unknown | Won | |
| Satellite Awards | 2011 | Best Television Series – Genre | Torchwood | —N/a | Nominated | |
| Satellite Awards | 2011 | Best Actress in a Series – Drama | Eve Myles | —N/a | Nominated | |
| Saturn Awards | 2008 | Best International Series | Torchwood | —N/a | Nominated | |
| Saturn Awards | 2009 | Best Television DVD Release | Torchwood: Series 2 | —N/a | Nominated | |
| Saturn Awards | 2010 | Best Television Presentation | Torchwood: Children of Earth | | Won | |
| Saturn Awards | 2010 | Best Television DVD Release | Torchwood: Children of Earth | | Nominated | |
| Saturn Awards | 2012 | Best Television Presentation | Torchwood: Miracle Day | —N/a | Nominated | |
| Saturn Awards | 2012 | Best Actress on Television | Eve Myles | —N/a | Nominated | |
| Saturn Awards | 2012 | Best Supporting Actor on Television | Bill Pullman | —N/a | Nominated | |
| Saturn Awards | 2012 | Best Supporting Actress on Television | Lauren Ambrose | —N/a | Nominated | |
| SFX Awards | 2007 | Best TV Actress | Eve Myles | —N/a | Nominated | |
| SFX Awards | 2008 | Best TV Show | Torchwood | —N/a | Nominated | |
| SFX Awards | 2008 | Best TV Episode | Chris Chibnall | "Fragments" | Nominated | |
| SFX Awards | 2008 | Best TV Episode | Chris Chibnall | "Exit Wounds" | Nominated | |
| SFX Awards | 2008 | Best TV Actor | John Barrowman | —N/a | Nominated | |
| SFX Awards | 2008 | Sexiest Man | John Barrowman | —N/a | Nominated | |
| SFX Awards | 2008 | Sexiest Man | Gareth David-Lloyd | —N/a | Nominated | |
| SFX Awards | 2008 | Sexiest Woman | Eve Myles | —N/a | Nominated | |
| SFX Awards | 2008 | Best TV Actress | Eve Myles | —N/a | Nominated | |
| SFX Awards | 2010 | Best Actress | Eve Myles | Children of Earth | Won | |
| SFX Awards | 2010 | Sexiest Female | Eve Myles | Children of Earth | Nominated | |
| SFX Awards | 2010 | Sexiest Male | John Barrowman | Children of Earth | Nominated | |
| SFX Awards | 2010 | Sexiest Male | Gareth David-Lloyd | Children of Earth | Nominated | |
| SFX Awards | 2010 | Cult Hero | Gareth David-Lloyd | Children of Earth | Won | |
| SFX Awards | 2010 | Best Actor | Gareth David-Lloyd | Children of Earth | Nominated | |
| SFX Awards | 2010 | Best Actor | Peter Capaldi | Children of Earth | Nominated | |
| SFX Awards | 2010 | Best Monster/Villain | The 456 | Children of Earth | Won | |
| SFX Awards | 2010 | Best Death Scene | Ianto is killed by the 456 | "Children of Earth: Day Four" | Won | |
| SFX Awards | 2010 | Best Plot Twist | Captain Jack sacrifices his grandson | "Children of Earth: Day Five" | Won | |
| SFX Awards | 2010 | Best TV Episode | Russell T Davies | "Children of Earth: Day Five" | Won | |
| SFX Awards | 2010 | Best Fight Scene | PC Andy gets stuck in | "Children of Earth: Day Five" | Won | |
| SFX Awards | 2010 | Best TV Show | Torchwood: Children of Earth | | Nominated | |
| SFX Awards | 2012 | Best TV Show | Torchwood: Miracle Day | —N/a | Nominated | |
| SFX Awards | 2012 | Best Actress | Eve Myles | —N/a | Nominated | |
| SFX Awards | 2012 | Sexiest Woman | Eve Myles | —N/a | Nominated | |
| SFX Awards | 2012 | Sexiest Man | John Barrowman | —N/a | Nominated | |
| SFX Awards | 2012 | Biggest Disappointment | Jack's arse being censored in UK Torchwood | Unknown | Nominated | |
| TCA Awards | 2010 | Outstanding Achievement in Movies, Miniseries and Specials | Torchwood: Children of Earth | | Nominated | |

== Home media ==
The complete first series has been released on Region 2 DVD in the UK. A North American Region 1 release occurred 22 January 2008, following the broadcast of Series 1 on BBC America in the United States and the CBC in Canada. Series One Part One, Two and Three have been released in Australia Region 4, The complete series 1 sets released in the UK and US also include the episodes of the behind-the-scenes series Torchwood Declassified. The Complete Second Series was released on 30 June 2008 (Region 2), along with the Complete First series on Blu-ray and HD DVD. Series One, Two, Three and Four episodes are currently available for download through iTunes, Amazon, and Netflix.

=== DVD ===
| DVD release name | UK release date (region 2) | North American release date (region 1) | Australian release date (region 4) | New Zealand release date (region 4) |
|---|---|---|---|---|
| Series One | Part One (episodes 1–5): 26 December 2006 | Complete (episodes 1–13): 22 January 2008 | Part One (episodes 1–5): 31 July 2007 | Complete (episodes 1–13): 11 September 2008 |
| Series One | Part Two (episodes 6–9): 26 February 2007 | Complete (episodes 1–13): 22 January 2008 | Part Two (episodes 6–9): 6 September 2007 | Complete (episodes 1–13): 11 September 2008 |
| Series One | Part Three (episodes 10–13): 26 March 2007 | Complete (episodes 1–13): 22 January 2008 | Part Three (Episodes 10–13): 2 October 2007 | Complete (episodes 1–13): 11 September 2008 |
| Series One | Complete (episodes 1–13): 19 November 2007 | Complete (episodes 1–13): 22 January 2008 | Complete (episodes 1–13): 6 February 2008 | Complete (episodes 1–13): 11 September 2008 |
| Series Two | Complete (episodes 1–13): 30 June 2008 | Complete (episodes 1–13): 16 September 2008 | Complete (episodes 1–13): 2 October 2008 | Complete (Episodes 1–13): 15 January 2009 |
| Complete Series One & Two | Complete (episodes 1–26): 10 November 2008 | N/A | N/A | N/A |
| Children of Earth (series 3) | Complete (episodes 1–5): 13 July 2009 | Complete (episodes 1–5): 28 July 2009 | Complete (episodes 1–5): 1 October 2009 | Complete (episodes 1–5): 17 March 2010 |
| The Complete Series (1–3) | Complete Series (episodes 1–31): 26 October 2009 | Complete Series (episodes 1–31): 19 July 2011 | Complete Series (episodes 1–31): 5 August 2010 | Complete Series (episodes 1–31): 1 September 2010 |
| Torchwood — Miracle Day (series 4) | Complete (episodes 1–10): 14 November 2011 | Complete (episodes 1–10): 3 April 2012 | Complete (episodes 1–10): 1 December 2011 | Complete (episodes 1–10): 7 December 2011 |
| The Complete Series (1–4) | Complete Series (episodes 1–41): 14 November 2011 | N/A | N/A | N/A |

=== HD DVD ===
| HD DVD release name | UK release date (region free) |
|---|---|
| The Complete First Series | 30 June 2008 |

=== Blu-ray ===
| Blu-ray release name | UK release date (region B) | North American release date (region A) | Australian release Date (region B) | New Zealand release Date (region B) |
|---|---|---|---|---|
| The Complete First Series | 30 June 2008; Region-free | 16 September 2008 | 1 October 2009 | 1 October 2009 |
| The Complete Second Series | 22 June 2009; Region-free | 7 July 2009 | 1 October 2009 | 17 March 2010 |
| Children of Earth | 13 July 2009; Region-free | 28 July 2009 | 1 October 2009 | 17 March 2010 |
| The Complete Series (1–3) | 26 October 2009; Region-free | 19 July 2011 | 4 November 2010 | |
| Miracle Day | 14 November 2011; Region-free | 3 April 2012 | 1 December 2011 | 7 December 2011 |
| The Complete Series (1–4) | 14 November 2011; Region-free | | | |

== Broadcast ==
=== Australia ===
In Australia, after the ABC and SBS passed on the series, Network Ten acquired the rights to air it. After its première on 18 June 2007, a reviewer for The Sydney Morning Herald's The Guide said, "The appeal of Torchwood is not so much that it's gloriously implausible sci-fi pulp, but that it knows it's gloriously implausible, sci-fi pulp". Ten's press release cites rival programming in their decision to move the show to a Wednesday 12 am timeslot halfway through the series. Torchwood now airs on UKTV in Australia. Series 1 was played on Imparja, but as of 3 February 2008 the station is no longer affiliated with Ten and will not screen more. Series 2 of Torchwood aired on Ten HD from 1 September 2008. On 19 June 2009, ABC2 began broadcasting series 1, 2 and 3 on Fridays at 8:30 pm. When series 2 started broadcasting on 18 September 2009, ABC2 started broadcasting Torchwood Declassified after each episode. ABC2 began airing Children of Earth on 8 January 2010 weekly and it was earlier fasttracked by UKTV. Miracle Day was fast tracked by UKTV for July 2011 following the global premiere on Starz.

=== New Zealand ===
The first series began screening on TV2 in New Zealand on Wednesday, 9 July 2008, starting with series 1 and running straight through to the fourth episode ("Meat") in the second series. Series 2 continued airing on 11 February 2009 and series 3 premiered on 10 February 2010. Repeat screenings of the first two series began on 16 March 2010 after the conclusion of Children of Earth during the previous week. On 13 August 2010, Children of Earth began repeated transmission after the conclusion of the second series on 6 August 2010. Repeats also aired on BBC UKTV.

=== Europe ===
In France, the first series began airing on 12 October 2007 on NRJ 12, and since 13 January 2009 on Syfy. The second series began on 5 September 2008 on NRJ 12 and the third series began on 17 November 2009 also on NRJ 12. In Germany, RTL 2 broadcast series 1 to 4. The first series started airing on 28 June 2010 on Icelandic network Stöð 2. In Italy, the first series started airing on 3 September 2007 on Jimmy, in 2011–12, Rai4 started to broadcast the whole show around 07.00 pm, starting with series 1, and then broadcasting Series 4 on primetime.

Portuguese network SIC Radical started transmitting the first series in January 2009. Subsequently, the complete series was picked up by AXN Black and the Portuguese Syfy channel. The first series premiered on 24 June 2007 and the second series 6 July 2007 on Swedish network TV4+. Serbia aired the first and second series on the network RTS from 19 August 2009, RTS began showing the third series from 25 March 2010. Bulgaria aired first, second and third series on the AXN Sci-fi channel. In Poland, BBC Entertainment broadcast series 1; premiere: 16 September 2008, 2, 3 and 4 (premiere: 28 October 2012) in censored version.

=== North America ===
The Canadian Broadcasting Corporation helped to finance the first two series, as they had the revived production of Doctor Who in 2005. On 2 April 2007, BBC America had acquired the rights to broadcast the series in the United States. The series started on 8 September 2007; the initial broadcast of the series was tied into a "radical makeover" of the channel that was to occur later in 2007. The second series started on BBC America 26 January 2008, and the third on 20 July 2009. Torchwood has become one of the higher rated programmes for BBC America with its first series premiere in September 2007 attracting an audience of almost half a million viewers. HDNet acquired the US high definition rights for the first 26 episodes (series 1 and 2) and began airing series 1 episodes on Monday evenings, starting 17 September 2007. On 11 February 2008, HDNet began showing series 2 episodes.

The Canadian network CBC was a co-producer of series 1, and premiered in October 2007. The show airs for French-speaking Canadian audiences on Ztélé.

Series 2 began airing on Space on 8 August 2008 and series 3 was aired on Space over five consecutive nights in 20–24 July 2009. Miracle Day premiered on 9 July 2011 on Space. on 2 January 2012 Space aired a Torchwood marathon of Children of Earth and Miracle Day. Miracle Day was repeated on Starz in Black in a marathon format on Labour Day Weekend 2012.

== See also ==
- Doctor Who spin-offs
- List of Torchwood episodes
- List of Torchwood novels
- List of Torchwood writers
- List of Welsh television series

== Bibliography ==
- Bradley, Dave, ed. (17 December 2008). "SFX Reader Awards 2008". SFX. No. 178. Bath, Somerset: Future Publishing. pp. 93–100.
- Bradley, Dave, ed. (February 2010). "SFX Sci-Fi Awards 2010 in association with Play.com". SFX. No. 193. Bath, Somerset: Future Publishing. pp. 95–101.
- Bradley, Dave, ed. (8 February 2012). "SFX Sci-Fi Awards 2012". SFX. No. 219. Bath, Somerset: Future Publishing. pp. 90–97.
