= Torchwood: Miracle Day =

2011 Torchwood series

- Showrunner: Russell T Davies
- Starring: John Barrowman; Eve Myles; Mekhi Phifer; Alexa Havins; Kai Owen; Bill Pullman
- No. of episodes: 10

Release
- Original network: Starz; BBC One
- Original release: 8 July – 9 September 2011 (Starz)
- Original release: 14 July – 15 September 2011 (BBC One)

Series chronology
- ← Previous; Series 3: Children of Earth

Torchwood: Miracle Day is the fourth and final series of the British science fiction television programme Torchwood, a spin-off from the long-running show Doctor Who. In contrast to the first three series, which were produced by the BBC, the fourth series was a British co-production involving the BBC's drama production house BBC Cymru Wales for BBC Worldwide and the US premium network Starz. It was broadcast in ten episodes beginning on 8 July 2011 (U.S.) and 14 July 2011 (UK).

The central plot of Miracle Day is that suddenly no one on Earth can die, which impels increasingly troublesome legislative changes around the world as the global population soars. In addition to a number of new American cast members and guest actors, showrunner Russell T Davies recruited several American television writers to write for Miracle Day, including Jane Espenson, John Shiban and Doris Egan. British writer John Fay also returned to write for the series, under Davies as head writer. Production was partially divided along trans-Atlantic lines, with Kelly Manners producing in the US, and Brian Minchin in the UK. The majority of the filming took place in Los Angeles, California, with two weeks of additional shooting in Wales.

Although the series premiered to a high Audience Appreciation Index rating (85, considered "excellent") and solid ratings in the UK, American critics were on the whole less favourable to the series opener. Reviews on both sides of the Atlantic became increasingly mixed as the series went on. Several commentators felt the series would have worked better as a five-episode series, highlighting concerns with inconsistent pacing, dangling plot threads, and a repetitive feel to mid-series episodes.

The series has a 10-episode companion web series Torchwood: Web of Lies, referenced on the Starz website (but not on the BBC One website) related to the series. It was available as an app from the iTunes Store, and the first episode can be obtained for free, and was available on Starz's YouTube channel. It is available in its entirety (without its interactive elements) in the series' DVD and Blu-ray releases. The series premiered on BBC America on 14 September 2013.

== Synopsis ==
Around the world, people who have suffered usually fatal wounds or diseases are suddenly unable to die, first revealed when the execution of child killer Oswald Danes fails. Initially seen as a religious miracle, the absence of death strains medical resources and spreads disease; governments estimate that without action the world will be unable to sustain population growth within months.

Central Intelligence Agency agents Rex Matheson, who suffered a fatal accident but survived, and Esther Drummond discover the name "Torchwood" tied with these events and locate its remaining members, Jack Harkness and Gwen Cooper. Bringing them to the United States, they are pursued by agents behind a pharmaceutical company, PhiCorp, who they find planned for the 'miracle' by stockpiling drugs. Jack discovers he is no longer immortal and believes this is connected to the miracle. Jack brings Rex and Esther within Torchwood's fold.

World governments force anyone who would normally have died into camps. Torchwood infiltrates one and discovers the patients are incinerated. They reveal this to the public, hoping the camps will shut down, but governments refuse, believing the camps to be necessary; the news puts the world into chaos. Torchwood tracks PhiCorp, discovering they have agencies across the globe. Jack realises that PhiCorp are run by the Families, descendants of three family patriarchs he encountered in New York in the 1920s. Frightened by, and covetous of, his immortality, they bought him, using scientific tests and bloodletting to try to understand his condition. The Families grew powerful and created the miracle for financial and political ends.

Months pass and the world slides into financial depression. Torchwood recognizes that the Families manipulated events just prior to the miracle in Shanghai and Buenos Aires, two points on opposite sides of the globe. With information from Danes, Jack realises the Families found the Blessing, a crack that runs through the Earth and generates a morphic field connected to humanity. They had sent the immortal blood they collected from Jack into both sides simultaneously, which "rewrote" his immortality in the rest of humanity as a defence mechanism. The team splits up between Jack and Gwen, and Rex and Esther, to investigate both points. Each finds the site in the control of the Families, and the only way to reverse the miracle is to reintroduce Jack's now-mortal blood into the Blessing from both ends. Rex reveals he transfused himself with Jack's blood. A member of the Families fatally shoots Esther, meaning she will die if the miracle is reversed. Gwen tells Rex not to stop, and simultaneously, as Rex opens a wound, Gwen shoots Jack and the blood enters the Blessing from both ends, ending the miracle. As the two facilities collapse, Rex helps Esther escape but she dies, while Jack regains his immortality and escapes with Gwen. As the world again copes with death and Torchwood attends Esther's funeral, Rex is shot by a Families mole in the CIA. He finds that, like Jack, he is immortal.

== Episodes ==
List of Torchwood: Miracle Day episodes
No. overall	No. in series	Title	Directed by	Written by	Original U.S. release date	Original UK release date	Prod. code	UK viewers (millions)
32	1	"The New World"	Bharat Nalluri	Russell T Davies	8 July 2011	14 July 2011	401	6.59
Earth is facing a phenomenon known as "Miracle Day", where for over 24 hours nobody dies, and the world within four months will become unsustainable through its soaring population. Every United States Government agency receives a tip on Torchwood, only to later find every trace of the word deleted by the newly returned Jack Harkness, who discovers that he is now mortal. Separately, he and CIA agent Rex Matheson — who has suffered a 'fatal' accident but cannot die — travel to South Wales to find Gwen Cooper, who is living in exile with husband Rhys and infant daughter Anwen. Jack, Rhys and Gwen find themselves under attack by unknown assailants in a helicopter. After Rex arrives, Jack saves them. Then Rex has Jack and Gwen extradited to the United States.
33	2	"Rendition"	Billy Gierhart	Doris Egan	15 July 2011	21 July 2011	402	5.75
As Rex brings the Torchwood team to America, problems arise on the plane: CIA operatives are plotting to remove them, and poison Jack, who is now the only mortal man on the planet. Gwen and Rex, with the help of Doctor Vera Juarez, create an antidote. Meanwhile, Oswald Danes begins appearing on talk shows, generating buzz in the press and online after seemingly apologizing on national television. Upon landing, Rex and his colleague Esther find that they have been framed as traitors by an unknown party. Realising that they are being hunted, Rex and Esther join Jack and Gwen and go on the run.
34	3	"Dead of Night"	Billy Gierhart	Jane Espenson	22 July 2011	28 July 2011	403	5.49
Still on the run, Torchwood infiltrate PhiCorp's DC headquarters and discover an incriminatingly large stockpile of pain medication suggesting foreknowledge of the Miracle. Later, Rex persuades Doctor Juarez to go undercover for Torchwood at a PhiCorp event. Torchwood's location is compromised, however, when the Miracle's conspirators contact the cell phone Torchwood stole from the CIA's director Friedkin (Wayne Knight).
35	4	"Escape to L.A."	Billy Gierhart	Story by : Jim Gray; Teleplay by : Jim Gray & John Shiban	29 July 2011	4 August 2011	404	5.19
The Torchwood team relocates to California in order to better investigate PhiCorp. However, after Esther makes the mistake of trying to help her sister (Candace Brown), an assassin (C. Thomas Howell) is able to track Torchwood there. Torchwood manages to recover important servers out of PhiCorp's HQ, and discovers plans for concentration camp facilities all over the world. Before his throat is shot, the assassin reveals that 'the Families' are behind the Miracle. Subsequently, Rhys calls and informs Gwen that her father has been put in a camp. Meanwhile, Oswald and Jilly find themselves with a politician (Mare Winningham) leading an anti-undying segregation campaign called "Dead is Dead" that threatens PhiCorp's plans.
36	5	"The Categories of Life"	Guy Ferland	Jane Espenson	5 August 2011	11 August 2011	405	5.17
Vera, Rex and Esther go undercover into the overflow camps where they find a shocking revelation to those marked Categories 1 or 2. Meanwhile, Captain Jack attempts to convince Oswald Danes to expose PhiCorp's advanced knowledge of the Miracle in front of a televised audience. Gwen returns to Wales to set her dad free, but so far only manages to make his condition worse. When Vera challenges the camp's unethical practices, director Colin Maloney (Marc Vann) shoots her and has her incinerated. Rex finds Vera, but unable to free her, is forced to video the incident for posterity.
37	6	"The Middle Men"	Guy Ferland	John Shiban	12 August 2011	18 August 2011	406	4.60
At San Pedro, Esther and Rex stumble into — and eventually, free from, a confrontation with Vera's murderer. Jack is able to reach PhiCorp COO Stuart Owens (Ernie Hudson), only to learn that PhiCorp are pawns of the Miracle's real conspirators too; Owens does reveal, however, that something called "the Blessing" is connected to the Miracle. Owens' agent in Shanghai (Eric Steinberg) made himself a category 1 after witnessing something awful there. In Wales, Gwen manages to smuggle her father out in Rhys's van, and destroys the Module where people are burnt. This is broadcast along with Rex's video of Vera's incineration online, but to little effect. Returning to LAX, Gwen receives a message from someone through her Torchwood contact lenses: if she ever wants to see her husband, daughter, or mother again, she must deliver Jack to them.
38	7	"Immortal Sins"	Gwyneth Horder-Payton	Jane Espenson	19 August 2011	25 August 2011	407	4.48
In the present day, Gwen takes Jack hostage to free her kidnapped family; the two have an intense and brutally honest conversation. Flashbacks show Jack on-mission in 1927 and 1928 New York and falling in love with an Italian immigrant named Angelo (Daniele Favilli), but Jack's immortality soon causes him to be viewed with fear and suspicion by the religious community of Little Italy; his torture and bloodletting provide "the blessing" at the heart of the Miracle today. With some intervention from Esther and Rex, Gwen's family are saved by PC Andy and Jack and Gwen are saved from the kidnapper (Nana Visitor), who then persuades Jack to come along with her by telling him one man is still waiting for him: Angelo.
39	8	"End of the Road"	Gwyneth Horder-Payton	Story by : Ryan Scott; Teleplay by : Ryan Scott & Jane Espenson	26 August 2011	1 September 2011	408	4.64
Taken to confront Angelo as the stock market begins to collapse following the failure of the pension scheme, Jack is shaken to learn that his former lover has actually lived his way to the present through relatively natural means, having aged normally all this time. His granddaughter reveals that the Miracle was caused by the three families of the men who 'bought' Jack in 1928 using samples of Jack's blood and 'the Blessing' that they discovered in 1998. Although the CIA attempt to take control, matters become complicated when Angelo dies—the first true death since the Miracle began—revealing that his bed is over a device generating a null field. With Gwen having been deported, Jack and Esther are forced to flee with a vital component of the field after Jack is shot. Rex and Esther's colleague Charlotte (Marina Benedict) is also revealed to be a mole for the Families.
40	9	"The Gathering"	Guy Ferland	John Fay	2 September 2011	8 September 2011	409	4.63
Two months later, and global recession has become global Depression. Esther nursed Jack to health and has been collecting blood samples from him in Scotland; Gwen continues to hide her father from police raids, while also selling stolen painkillers; and Rex is back working at the CIA; Jilly Kitzinger moves to Shanghai to work for the Families. Oswald Danes finds Gwen through the men who smuggled Jack into Scotland, forcing Esther and Jack to come to Swansea, where what Danes knows of Kitzinger's activities leads them to conclude the Blessing is located in both Buenos Aires and Shanghai. Rex's attempts to locate a descendant of a witness to Jack's repeated murders in Little Italy are foiled by Charlotte at the CIA. The police raid the house and locate Geraint with thermal imaging, and take him away. Gwen is forced to take Oswald with them as she and Jack smuggle their way into Shanghai, where Jack's blood is being physically pulled to the location of the Blessing. Esther meets up with Rex in Buenos Aires for their half of the mission, but they are being tracked by Charlotte.
41	10	"The Blood Line"	Billy Gierhart	Story by : Russell T Davies; Teleplay by : Russell T Davies & Jane Espenson	9 September 2011	15 September 2011	410	5.13
At CIA HQ, Charlotte is able to protect her secret by blowing up Shapiro (John de Lancie) and Noah (Paul James). Rex and Esther face a setback when the suitcase containing Jack's blood is blown up by a Families agent in the Buenos Aires military. Jack and Gwen strap Oswald to explosives to gain leverage over the Families, and learn that the miracle was caused when the Blessing — an unexplained rock formation controlling the morphic field — reacted defensively when introduced to Jack's immortal blood. Rex reveals that he secretly transfused himself with Jack's blood to keep it safe, meaning both agents are able to bloodlet into the Blessing at either end at the cost of their lives, thus ending the miracle. Esther is shot, but the group proceeds. Gwen shoots Jack, knowing that she is effectively killing her father, him, Rex and Esther. With death restored, Oswald blows himself up along with a senior Family member (Frances Fisher); Gwen's father dies. Jack's immortality is restored; he resurrects and escapes the facility with Gwen and Jilly. Several months later, Jilly is approached again by a Family agent (Teddy Sears) about assisting with their Plan B. Paramedics manage to revive Rex, but not Esther. At Esther's funeral, Charlotte's duplicity is revealed; she shoots Rex and is shot. To everyone's shock, however, Rex displays Jack's special ability, and instantly heals from his mortal wound.

== Production ==
=== Development ===
Early development rumours suggested that the fourth series would be a reboot of the show, and that it would air on Fox Network in the United States. However, the deal with Fox did not go through and a new co-production deal with Starz was officially announced. Torchwood creator and executive producer Russell T Davies clarified the focus of the series, stating "it's very much the next step. It's not a new version, it's not a reboot. We're simply moving countries." The series was first announced with the title Torchwood: The New World, though this was revised to Torchwood: Miracle Day later in development (The New World became the title of the first episode). The second executive producer, Julie Gardner, described the new series as being absolutely ready "to welcome in a new audience". Series writer Jane Espenson clarified further, describing the series as strictly "a continuation of the UK show".

=== Writing ===
Miracle Day was developed through a collaborative plotting, with individual episodes subsequently assigned to individual writers. Gardner and Davies spent four weeks alongside their writing staff working through the complete story. Writers subsequently elected to write those episodes which reflected their particular interests in certain themes or characters. The writing team chose to revise each episode before the first scene was shot; writer Jane Espenson felt this would give the series a much tighter feel and greater overall continuity. In writing Children of Earth and Miracle Day, Davies found his preference for the mini-series format and has stated Torchwood will not return to the "monster-of-the-week" stories typical of the show's first two series, finding the new format "more ambitious and intelligent".

=== Casting ===
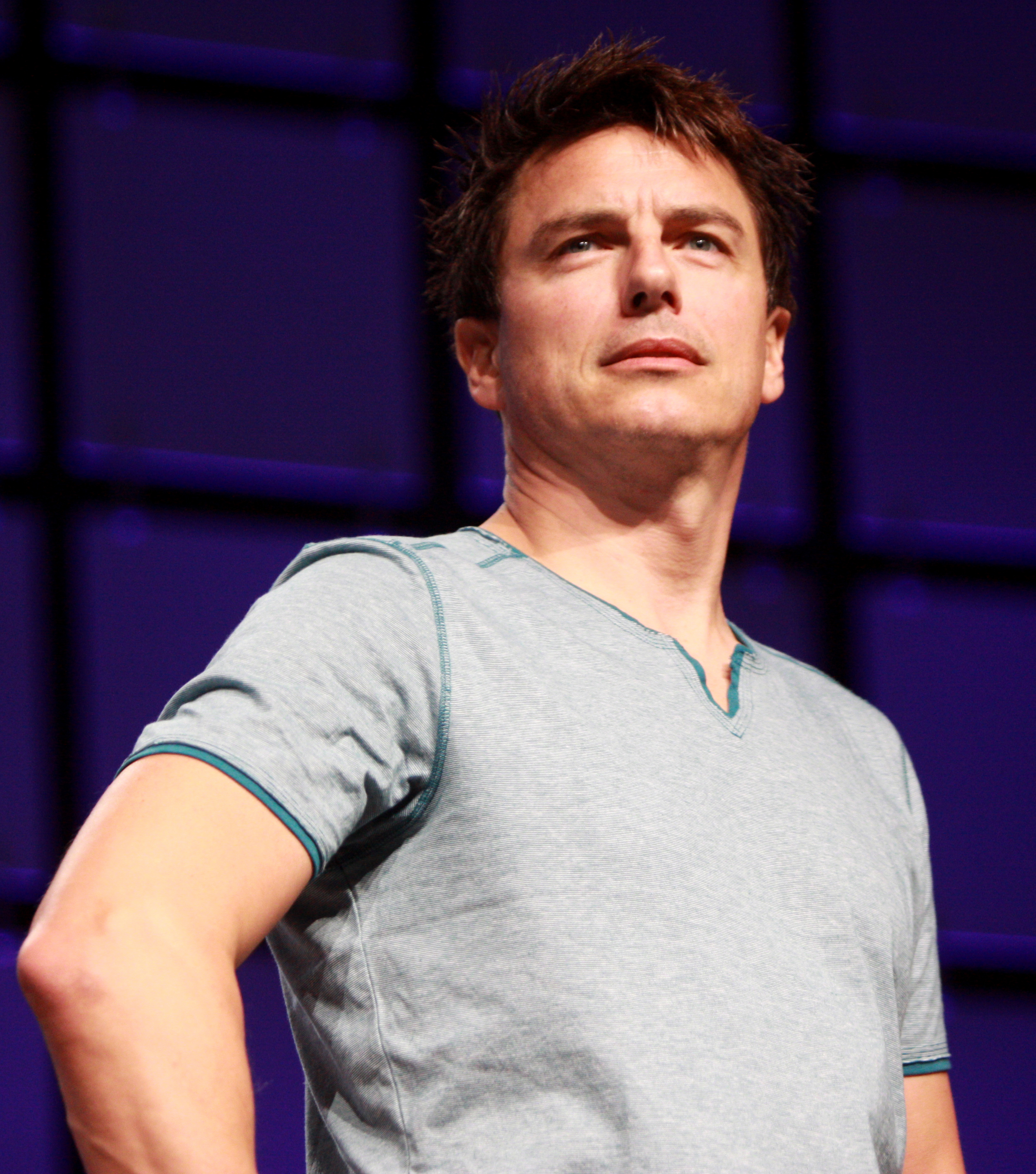
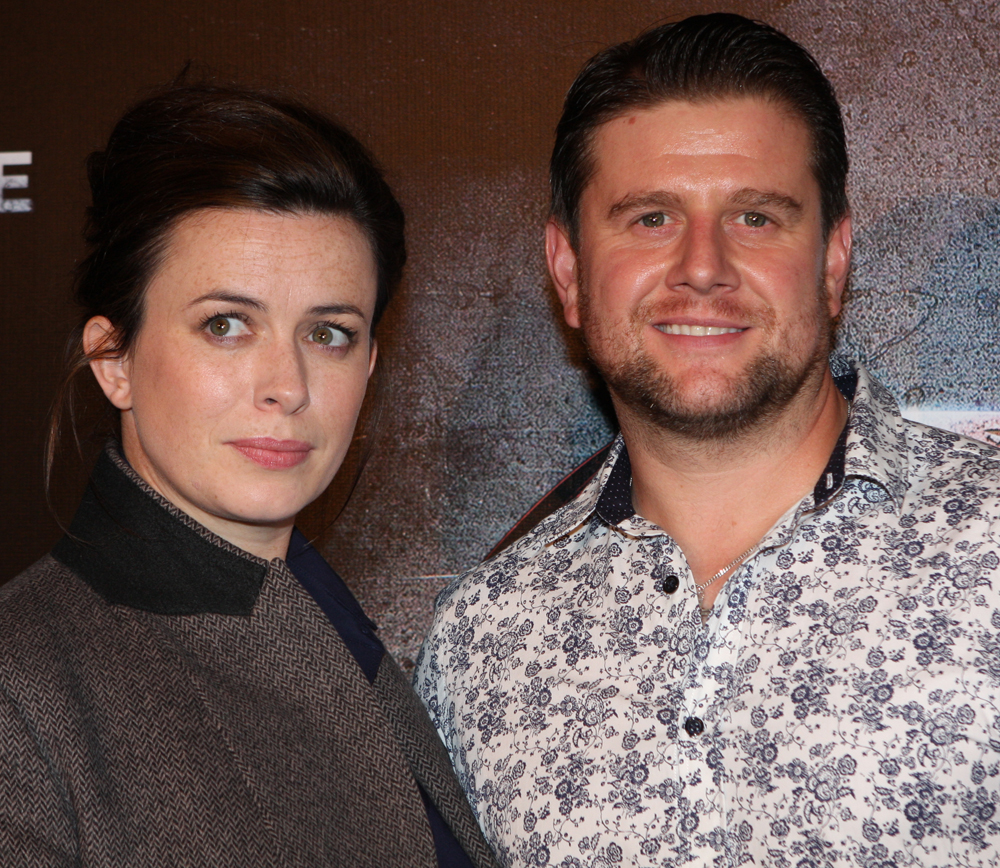
Miracle Day saw the return of Torchwood's three remaining lead actors; John Barrowman (top), Eve Myles (left) and Kai Owen (right).

The show's remaining three regulars returned to the series, with John Barrowman as Captain Jack Harkness, Eve Myles as Gwen Cooper and Kai Owen as Rhys Williams, Gwen's husband. Within the series, Captain Jack is an immortal ex-conman from the 51st century who first appeared in the 2005 Doctor Who episode "The Empty Child". In the first three series of Torchwood, Jack ran the Cardiff remnant of the Torchwood Institute, and was "the happiest he'd ever been". After the destruction of Torchwood and the deaths of his grandson, friends, and his lover Ianto Jones in the third series, the only thing that could bring Jack back to Earth is "his unstated love for Gwen Cooper and Torchwood". Gwen was previously seen heavily pregnant at the end of the third series by her husband Rhys. Since the fall of Torchwood, they have begun a quiet life living in seclusion with their baby, Anwen. Other returning characters included Gwen's former police partner PC Andy (Tom Price), now a sergeant, and her parents Geraint (William Thomas) and Mary Cooper (Sharon Morgan), who previously appeared in the 2008 Torchwood episode "Something Borrowed". All three featured in recurring roles.

Mekhi Phifer joined the show as Rex Matheson, the CIA's "golden boy" operative, fast-tracked for career stardom. Highly intelligent and heroic, he teams up with Jack and Gwen to solve the mystery behind "Miracle Day". He is joined by Esther Drummond (Alexa Havins), a CIA watch analyst with an optimistic faith in humanity. Arlene Tur was cast as surgeon Vera Juarez, while Bill Pullman played Oswald Danes, a dangerous convicted child sex offender and murderer who turns a prison release into celebrity status. Oswald faces lethal injection, but becomes swept up in the story's plot thread when he — like the rest of the world — simply does not die. Lauren Ambrose was cast as Jilly Kitzinger in seven of the ten episodes. Her character is described as "a sweet-talking PR genius with a heart of stone who's just cornered the most important client of her career ... and maybe of all time". Guest stars included Lena Kaur, Dichen Lachman, Wayne Knight, Ernie Hudson, C. Thomas Howell, John de Lancie, Nana Visitor and Dillon Casey.

Casting calls differed from the final press release. Pullman and Havins' characters' names were originally Oswald Jones and Esther Katusi, respectively. Additionally, calls originally specified that Rex was to be played by a white actor and Esther by a non-white actress. One Tree Hill's Chad Michael Murray and Dollhouse's Enver Gjokaj both auditioned for the part of Matheson. Greek star Amber Stevens also auditioned for the part of Katusi/Drummond. During the development phase, actor James Marsters expressed strong interest in returning as his Series 2 character Captain John Hart.

==== Main cast and guest stars ====
Actor	Character	Notes	Episodes
John Barrowman	Captain Jack Harkness		All
Eve Myles	Gwen Cooper		All
Mekhi Phifer	Rex Matheson		All
Alexa Havins	Esther Drummond		All
Kai Owen	Rhys Williams		All
Bill Pullman	Oswald Danes		1–5, 8–10
Lauren Ambrose	Jilly Kitzinger		2–5, 8–10
Sharon Morgan	Mary Cooper		1, 5, 7–10
Arlene Tur	Dr. Vera Juarez		1–5
Tom Price	Sergeant Andy Davidson		1–2, 5, 7, 10
William Thomas	Geraint Cooper		1, 5–6, 9–10
Paul James	Noah Vickers		1–2, 8–10
Marina Benedict	Charlotte Wills		1–2, 8–10
Teddy Sears	Blue-eyed Man		5, 8–10
Candace Brown	Sarah Drummond		4, 8, 10
Wayne Knight	Brian Friedkin		2–3, 8
John de Lancie	Allen Shapiro		8–10
Frances Fisher	The Mother		9–10
Nana Visitor	Olivia Colasanto		7–8
Daniele Favilli	Angelo Colasanto		7–8
Cris D'Annunzio	Salvatore Maranzano		7
Marc Vann	Colin Maloney		5–6
Fred Koehler	Ralph Coltrane		5–6
Dichen Lachman	Lyn Peterfield		2
Mare Winningham	Ellis Hartley Monroe		4
C. Thomas Howell	Torchwood Tracker		4

=== Locations ===
The whole series was filmed across two main locations: South Wales and Los Angeles, California.

=== Music ===
Torchwood and Doctor Who composer Murray Gold composed music for the fourth series with assistant composer Stu Kennedy.

== Promotion ==
A teaser trailer was released on 1 April 2011, featuring the earth stylised as a giant bomb after a news reporter announces that "At 10:36pm, the last death on the planet Earth was recorded." The song Perfect Day by Lou Reed was used as a backing soundtrack to the trailer. A promotional poster had earlier been released, featuring the same bomb motif. Actors John Barrowman and Bill Pullman, alongside executive producer Julie Gardner, attended the 2011 MIPTV event in Cannes to promote the series. Speaking of the new series, Gardner commented that "[Torchwood is] taking the Welsh global — retaining the best of British drama while learning all about US production values". John Barrowman spoke of how the new series will be "bigger and better" because of the increased opportunities of the American co-production. Promotional pictures of the Torchwood: Miracle Day Cast, along with character biographies, were released in May 2011. Jack Harkness and Gwen Cooper feature on the front cover of Radio Times magazine for 9–15 July 2011. The pair were also on the front cover of TV & Satellite Week for the same week. Starz organised a 'March of The Soulless' on Thursday, 7 July 2011 to promote the new series.

== Broadcast ==
Miracle Day was first shown on Starz on 8 July 2011 in the US. On 9 July 2011 it was shown on Space in Canada, and on UKTV Australia in Australia. It was first broadcast in the UK on 14 July 2011 on BBC One. On 19 July 2011 it was announced it had been bought by Eleven, a Network Ten Australia free-to-air digital-only channel, but as of 23 November 2012 has not broadcast it. Different edits were produced for the US and UK broadcasts. According to writer Jane Espenson, the only differences are "a 10 second trim in the UK version of ep.3 and a three-second cut in the UK ep.6." The actual cut for episode 3 for UK airing was 30 seconds.

== Critical reception ==
American reviews were mixed. The New York Times described the show as "a letdown" and the Los Angeles Times describing it as "repetitive".

Though Guardian reviewer Dan Martin had initially responded warmly to the series, his later overview of the series was more critical. Despite showing promise with its opener, Martin states that it is an "understatement" to say that Miracle Day has proved divisive with audiences. He recommends that the story would have worked better as a five-parter in the style of Children of Earth, as it seemed that the plot was stretched thin. Other criticisms focused on Jack's relatively minimal role, the unclear direction of the Oswald Danes storyline, the lack of an alien presence in the series, and the show's expectation that the audience care for Rex and Esther, whom they have not had a chance to get to know. Commenting that "the series seemed to spend weeks looking at the consequences of the Miracle, running away from unnamed baddies, extraditions, deportations, and dangling character arcs", he does however commend Davies for the innovative transatlantic production behind the series: "Perhaps the best way of looking at Miracle Day is as a first attempt. Taking a cultish British programme and giving it a cash injection and a platform for a global audience is a brave move."

After the series finale Martin further notes that "Children of Earth ended with a resolution that could have very easily wrapped the series up." Miracle Day, however, ended with several cliffhangers, which Martin found strange in view of its unfavourable reviews and the fact that Davies was not sure he would do any more Torchwood.

Charlie Jane Anders for io9 expressed some continuity concerns that are raised by relating Miracle Day to Doctor Who, the parent show of Torchwood. As Miracle Day seemingly supposes a catastrophic worldwide phenomenon lasting at least from March to May 2011, it seems quite incompatible with the world of Doctor Who, where in Steven Moffat's 2011 series, companions Amy (Karen Gillan) and Rory (Arthur Darvill) are based in this exact time period without any mention of the problem, or evidence of global catastrophe elsewhere. Anders comments that in the past, the two shows had always "maintained a fairly tight continuity".
