= The Blood Line (Torchwood) =

2011 Torchwood episode

41 – "The Blood Line"
- Torchwood episode

Cast
- Starring: John Barrowman – Captain Jack Harkness; Eve Myles – Gwen Cooper; Mekhi Phifer – Rex Matheson; Alexa Havins – Esther Drummond; Kai Owen – Rhys Williams; Bill Pullman – Oswald Danes
- Others: Lauren Ambrose – Jilly Kitzinger; Candace Brown – Sarah Drummond; Sharon Morgan – Mary Cooper; William Thomas – Geraint Cooper; Marina Benedict – Charlotte Willis; Paul James – Noah Vickers; John de Lancie – Allen Shapiro; Tom Price – Sgt Andy Davidson; Teddy Sears – Blue-eyed Man; Frances Fisher – The Mother; Benito Martinez – Captain Santos; Chris Butler – The Cousin; McKenzie Applegate – Girl; Veronica Diaz – Female Soldier; Noemi Del Rio – Sandra Morales; Fernando Fernandez – Young Male Soldier; Cici Lau - Chinese Woman; Laura Waddell – Cat One Nurse

Production
- Directed by: Billy Gierhart
- Written by: Story: Russell T Davies; Teleplay: Jane Espenson & Russell T Davies
- Produced by: Kelly A. Manners
- Executive producers: Russell T Davies; Julie Gardner; Jane Tranter; Jane Espenson (co-executive); Vlad Wolynetz (co-executive)
- Music by: Murray Gold
- Production code: 110
- Series: Miracle Day
- First broadcast: 9 September 2011 (US); 15 September 2011 (UK)

Chronology
← Preceded by "The Gathering"	Followed by → —

"The Blood Line" is the tenth and final episode of Torchwood: Miracle Day, the fourth series of the British science fiction television series Torchwood. It was first broadcast in the United States on Starz on 9 September 2011.

Torchwood: Miracle Day follows the aftermath of a day where humanity has stopped being able to die. In the episode, a team called Torchwood seek to stop the "Miracle" affecting humanity's ability to die, which is engineered by a group of human families seeking to control the world.

In 2012, creator Russell T Davies announced that the show will be on indefinite hiatus, citing personal reasons, making "The Blood Line" the show's overall series finale.

== Plot summary ==
Now aware that Jack's blood is drawn towards the Blessing, the Torchwood team uses small amounts of the blood to determine headings towards the two sites. Rex and Esther contact the CIA for assistance in infiltrating the Buenos Aires site of the Blessing, at the same time keeping Jack, Gwen, and Oswald's presence in Shanghai a secret. Director Shapiro agrees to the request and puts his team on the task, including Charlotte, who surreptitiously reports the mission to the Three Families. A detachment of the Argentinian Army under the command of Captain Federico Santos soon arrives to assist Rex and Esther, but while the group is loading up, a Three Families double agent detonates a suicide bomb, making the other soldiers Category 1 and destroying Rex and Esther's supply of Jack's blood. Rex, Esther, and Captain Santos survive unharmed, and Rex tells Santos to report that he and Esther were killed in the blast in order to better allow them to infiltrate the Blessing site.

At the CIA, Director Shapiro realizes the Three Families mole must be inside his team, and has Noah run a newly developed trace program to track any recent phone calls made using the Three Families' method of avoiding traces. Realizing she is moments from being discovered, Charlotte calmly retrieves a hidden explosive device from a side office, leaves it inside her purse in the main meeting room, and leaves. The resulting explosion 'category 1s' Shapiro and the rest of his team and lightly injures Charlotte, shielding her from any suspicion.

Jack, Gwen, and Oswald successfully infiltrate the Shanghai Blessing site and make their way to its exposed face, where they meet the Mother, Jilly Kitzinger, and several armed guards. The guards quickly stand down when Oswald reveals he is wearing an explosive vest (at Jack's suggestion). This advantage seems short-lived when a radio transmission from the Cousin at the Buenos Aires site reveals that Three Families operatives there have captured Esther and Rex, but when Oswald expresses that he didn't expect to leave Shanghai alive, the operatives temporarily stand down. After spending some time examining the face of the Blessing, deducing that it generates a morphic field linking the human race, Jack and Gwen question the Mother about the Miracle; she reveals that the Miracle was produced by introducing Jack's immortal blood to the Blessing - causing it to disperse immortality to the whole human race as a 'defence' to a perceived 'attack' - and furthermore is simply the first part in a larger plan to assert control of the world. By stopping death and destabilizing the economy, the Families are now poised to take control of the banks, thereby influencing the world governments, eventually leading to a fascist oligarchy which can "decide who lives, how long, where, and why."

When Jack moves to open his veins and release his blood into the Blessing (reasoning that his now-mortal blood would 'prompt' the Blessing to restore humanity's ability to die), the Mother stops him, explaining that this will not undo the Miracle, because the original effect required Jack's blood to be introduced at both Blessing sites simultaneously. Since Rex and Esther's supply of Jack's blood was destroyed, there is no way to do this, and the Mother orders all of Torchwood killed. Before this can happen, Rex manages to interrupt and claims that he still has some of Jack's blood with him—or rather in him. Upon arrival in Buenos Aires, Esther helped Rex transfuse almost all of Jack's blood into his body, which he notes only did not kill him because of the Miracle. The Mother counters that reversing the Miracle would require almost all of the blood in both Rex and Jack's bodies, which would likely kill at least one of them once the Miracle reverted, but Rex and Jack do not back down. The Cousin then shoots Esther, telling Rex that by undoing the Miracle he will now be killing Esther forever. Rex falters, torn by his feelings for Esther, but after reassurances from Jack and Gwen he rises and opens the wound over his heart, releasing Jack's blood into the Blessing. Simultaneously Gwen shoots Jack through the heart, releasing his blood as well.

The Miracle reverts almost immediately, accompanied by an effect which Gwen calls "a breath": all of the world's Category 1 patients regain consciousness for a few seconds, then pass away in the next breath. This includes Gwen's father, who awakes in time to hear his wife wishing him goodbye over the phone. At the same time both of the Blessing sites begin to shake, making the structure around them unstable. Oswald grabs the Mother and urges Gwen to leave; she does, but as the exit elevator rises, Jack comes back to life. A brief struggle ensues between Jilly and Gwen before Gwen incapacitates Jilly, returns in the elevator and rescues Jack. The Mother begs Oswald to let her go, but Oswald proclaims he is happy to die and go to hell; as that is where "all the bad little girls" go. Jack and Gwen escape from the facility just seconds before Oswald detonates his explosives, destroying the Shanghai facility. Jilly follows close behind but falls to the ground, Jack and Gwen are unable to go back for her and she is engulfed in the explosion. The Buenos Aires team moves to leave as well, but before the Cousin can make it out, Rex regains consciousness long enough to grab him and throw him over the edge of the chasm around the Blessing. Rex falls to the ground next to Esther, the two watching each other die, but are rescued by Captain Santos and members of the Argentinian Army. Paramedics immediately start working to revive both Rex and Esther.

Several months later, Jilly Kitzinger, having survived the destruction of the Shanghai facility, meets the Blue-Eyed Man at a familiar park bench. When she pleads that she has no place to go and no life to live, he offers her a chance to participate in the Three Families' "Plan B", then departs; after some delay, Jilly follows. Elsewhere, Gwen, Rhys, Jack, Charlotte and Rex attend a funeral for Esther. Afterward, as Charlotte is leaving, Rex receives recovered data from Noah's computer, and discovers the phone trace indicating that Charlotte is the mole. When Rex tries to stop her from leaving, Charlotte shoots him and is almost immediately gunned down by other agents. Jack and Gwen rush to Rex's side only to find him without a pulse, dead, but seconds later Rex gasps and regains consciousness. As he opens his shirt a stunned Jack, Gwen, and Rhys watch in shock as Rex's wounds heal completely.

== Broadcast and reception ==
When "The Blood Line" premiered in the U.S on 9 September 2011, it received an audience of 0.95 million. In the UK, it fared relatively well against the viewing figure drop after Torchwood: Children of Earth with a consolidated figure of 5.13 million.

Very much like the rest of the 10-part series, "The Blood Line" garnered a mixed response from television critics and the Torchwood fan base. The Guardian's Dan Martin noted that Torchwood finally showed its best in the series finale "with explosions, bloodshed and forced philosophical standoffs at every turn." Martin also comments that the story of Gwen's dad was closed with "class."

However, Den of Geek's Simon Brew was more hesitant, claiming it was 'an otherwise busy, but rarely brilliant finale. To be clear, I didn't hate it, nor do I have an urge to pour buckets of scorn on it. But I think it was one of the least interesting episodes in the series, for the most part. And as someone's who's enjoyed Miracle Day, that was a disappointment.' On a positive note, he did also say in regards to the open-ended cliffhanger, ' Torchwood has been very good at burning bridges at the end of its series, with finales that force the show to move to a new place for the following run.'

In a negative review for Uproxx, Alan Sepinwall said 'the season was too far gone for the finale to do much in the way of redeeming it, but we at least could have gone out on an interesting note. Instead, there were lots of explosions, lots of yelling, and very little that held my attention or made me feel anything in the way that, say, some of the sacrifices in "Children of Earth" did.' He also criticised the effect of the cliffhanger, saying 'so it turns out that this huge world-changing event was just a "trial run" for an even bigger plan on the part of the bad guys? Does anyone (other than Davies) think that what the series needs is to get even bigger?'
