= Immortal Sins =

2011 Torchwood episode

38 – "Immortal Sins"
- Torchwood episode

Cast
- Starring: John Barrowman – Captain Jack Harkness; Eve Myles – Gwen Cooper; Mekhi Phifer – Rex Matheson; Alexa Havins – Esther Drummond; Kai Owen – Rhys Williams
- Others: Sharon Morgan – Mary Cooper; Nana Visitor – Olivia Colasanto; Tom Price – Sergeant Andy Davidson; Daniele Favilli – Angelo Colasanto; Pat Asanti – Inspector; Michael Chomiak – SWAT Member; Cris D'Annunzio – Salvatore Maranzano; Will Green – Young Priest; Paul Hayes – Costerdane; Everton Lawrence – Ablemarch; Griffin Matthews – Young Man; Frank Medrano – Mr. Giardano; Angelica Montesano – Girl in Crowd; Shawn Parsons – Frines; Vanna Salviati – Elderly Woman; Jayne Taini – Mrs. Giardano; Darren Dupree Washington – SWAT Leader

Production
- Directed by: Gwyneth Horder-Payton
- Written by: Jane Espenson
- Produced by: Kelly A. Manners
- Executive producers: Russell T Davies; Julie Gardner; Jane Tranter; Jane Espenson (co-executive); Vlad Wolynetz (co-executive)
- Music by: Murray Gold
- Production code: 107
- Series: Miracle Day
- Running time: 55 minutes
- First broadcast: 19 August 2011 (US); 25 August 2011 (UK)

Chronology
← Preceded by "The Middle Men"	Followed by → "End of the Road"

"Immortal Sins" is the seventh episode of Torchwood: Miracle Day, the fourth series of the British science fiction television series Torchwood. It was originally broadcast in the United States on Starz on 19 August 2011.

Torchwood: Miracle Day follows the aftermath of a day where humanity has stopped being able to die. In the episode, Gwen Cooper (Eve Myles) is forced to take her fellow Torchwood member Jack Harkness (John Barrowman) to Angelo Colasanto, a former lover of Jack's from the 1920s who knows about the Miracle causing humanity's immortality. Flashbacks in the episode show Jack's encounter with Angelo (played in flashback by Daniele Favilli) in the 1920s where Jack was nearly bought by three businessmen.

== Plot summary ==
In July 1927, Jack (John Barrowman) catches an Italian immigrant named Angelo Colasanto (Daniele Favilli), who stole his visa at Ellis Island. Jack falls in love with Angelo and helps him move to Little Italy, New York where they become lovers and pose as minor bootleggers for the Catholic Church. Their activities earn the wrath of mobster Salvatore Maranzano (Cris D'Annunzio) whom Jack is able to convince to spare them by helping him obtain a crate that Salvatore's bosses want. Jack tells Angelo to leave as he doesn't want him to come to any harm, but Angelo refuses to abandon Jack.

After discovering the crate, Jack opens it and confirms that it contains the alien parasite that he had been sent to destroy. The parasite is one which lays its spores in the brain, slowly causing insanity. Jack explains to Angelo that Salvatore's bosses had been hired by the Trickster's brigade. The brigade plan to infect future Governor Franklin Delano Roosevelt so that he will be unable to lead America as President during World War II, thus causing Nazi Germany to win the war. Jack destroys the parasite and escapes from the warehouse with Angelo, but is shot in the head by the police while a horrified Angelo is arrested.

A year later, Angelo is released from Sing Sing and, to his shock, is greeted by Jack who is still alive. To calm Angelo, Jack explains that he survived the shooting and wants them to be together. However, remembering Jack's "death", Angelo stabs Jack, convinced that he is the devil. Soon the neighborhood learns about Jack, who is later brought to a butcher shop where the crowd viciously and repeatedly kill him, much to Angelo's horror. Mrs. Giardano fills a bottle with Jack's blood during one of his deaths. During one of his blackouts, Jack watches three mob bosses buy him from the butcher and make a pact. Angelo later helps Jack escape from the butcher shop in the hope of starting their lives together anew in Los Angeles. However, Jack feels betrayed by what Angelo did and abandons him, not wanting to see him grow old and die.

In the present, Gwen (Eve Myles) kidnaps Jack to meet the people who are holding Gwen's family hostage in their home in Wales. After waiting at the meeting place in California, they meet a woman (Nana Visitor) who knows about Jack. The mysterious group are caught by surprise when they are sniped by Rex (Mekhi Phifer) and Esther (Alexa Havins), who both earlier became suspicious of Gwen's behavior and learned the truth from the last messages recorded from her contact lenses. In the interim, Esther had contacted Andy (Tom Price) in Wales, who leads an armed police unit which rescues Gwen's family much to her relief. With Torchwood holding the mysterious woman at gunpoint, Jack demands answers about the miracle, but she tells Jack that he will still come with her to the man who knows how the miracle began. To Jack's shock, she tells him that the man is Angelo, who is still alive.

=== Continuity ===
- This is not the first time Jack has been to Ellis Island. He tells the Tenth Doctor and Martha Jones in "Utopia" that he first realised his immortality after being stabbed during a fight there in 1892.
- Jack tells Angelo about the Doctor and that he travels the world with a companion. This was the first direct reference to the Doctor in Miracle Day.
- Andy states that he had never before shot anyone. He was unarmed as a PC partnered with Gwen.
- Jack explains that the parasite was being employed by "the Trickster's brigade". The Trickster is a recurring enemy alien on The Sarah Jane Adventures, another Doctor Who spin-off. His brigade were shown in the Doctor Who episode "Turn Left" as having been behind the attempted use of Donna Noble to change history. Harkness provided an in-universe summary of the Trickster's Brigade for the episode of Captain Jack's Monster Files accompanying "Turn Left".
- Gwen asks Jack how many children he has had. His daughter, Alice Carter, and his grandson, Steven Carter, are depicted in Children of Earth.
- The parasite that Jack and Angelo encounter in the warehouse appears to be the same alien species that kills Owen's fiancée in the Torchwood second series episode "Fragments".

=== Outside References ===
- When Angelo is frightened by the apparent magic of Jack's vortex manipulator, Jack explains that technology can be so advanced as to be indistinguishable from magic, paraphrasing Clarke's Third Law.
- Jack alludes to the taller buildings that will be built on Manhattan in the near future; and cautions Angelo to save his money over the next two years because bad times are coming (i.e., the Wall Street crash of 1929 and the Great Depression).
- Jack states that Franklin D. Roosevelt will win the November 1928 election for New York Governor and go on to be elected President of the United States four years later. He also speaks of World War II and Nazi Germany.
- The Volstead Act was the enabling act for the Eighteenth Amendment to enforce prohibition throughout the United States.

== Reception ==
Den of Geek gave a positive review and said the episode "was particularly welcome" and that the "gamble" of imitating "old-school" Torchwood had "paid off". By reducing the screentime of Rex and Esther and keeping Oswald and Jilly out of the episode, Den of Geek felt that the Jack-centric flashbacks "deepened" the Miracle Day narrative, and praised Espenson for her writing.

The HD Room reviewer felt "Immortal Sins" was the best Miracle Day episode so far and praised the return to the "Time travel, aliens, last minute saves" plots of the earlier Torchwood series. The reviewer also praised the hacked contact lens plot device as being particularly inventive.

The Guardian's Dan Martin said that Miracle Day seemed all over the place. He continued by saying the plot is slow moving and makes no sense at all, and that this episode does not get people back on side. Martin stated that the random abduction of Gwen's family was a blessed relief, which allowed a character piece with her and Jack. On the episode Martin stated that it was completely obvious with all the flashbacks that Angelo was behind the kidnapping. Martin also said that it was nice to see Barrowman have something concrete to do after spending weeks on the sideline and nice to see how the Doctor's lifestyle has rubbed off on Jack. In conclusion Martin said that the episode made Gwen remember that she has a family and allowed the viewers to examine the two leads relationship, and references to the backstory was also a welcome relief and beyond all Eve Myles proved herself to be rather good at acting.
