= Oswald Danes =

Fictional character in Torchwood

- Torchwood character
- Bill Pullman as Oswald Danes in Torchwood episode "The New World"
- First appearance: "The New World" (2011)
- Last appearance: "The Blood Line"
- Portrayed by: Bill Pullman

In-universe information
- Affiliation: Jilly Kitzinger; Torchwood Institute
- Home era: Early 21st century

Oswald Danes is a fictional character in the BBC television programme Torchwood, a spin-off from the long-running series Doctor Who and is portrayed by American actor Bill Pullman. The character was promoted as one of five new main characters to join Torchwood in its fourth series, Torchwood: Miracle Day (2011), as part of a new co-production between Torchwood's British network, BBC One, and its American financiers on US premium television network Starz. Pullman appears in eight of the ten episodes, and is credited as a series regular. Whilst reaction to the serial and Pullman's character was mixed, Pullman's portrayal was praised by critics and in 2012 he received a Saturn Award nomination for Best Supporting Actor on Television.

Danes is a former schoolteacher who molested several of the little girls he taught, and eventually killed one of them. He was sentenced to death, but on the day of his execution - the so-called Miracle Day, when death ceases worldwide - Danes survives his own lethal injection. His survival draws global attention, and he subsequently is released from prison on a legal technicality. After being offered both exposure and protection by public relations expert Jilly Kitzinger (Lauren Ambrose), he becomes her client, which helps him gain more publicity. Following a series of events he ends up aiding Torchwood, a team composed of two former alien-hunters and two former CIA agents, on their mission to restore death to the world. Danes is killed off in the final episode of the series; when death is restored he takes one of the Torchwood team's enemies out in a murder–suicide.

Critics commented upon the character's resemblance both to horror film killers such as Freddy Krueger and Hannibal Lecter, as well as to American Evangelists and to the biblical Jesus Christ. The series also follows Danes' rise and fall in the public eye and the precariousness of fame. Though critics questioned the wisdom of having a pedophile as a character, the show's creative team was adamant that they had deliberately made him unlikable. In killing the character off, the creative team did not wish to suggest that the character had been redeemed for his earlier crimes, and made sure that this was emphasised even in his final act of self-sacrifice.

== Appearances ==
The first scene of Miracle Day depicts Oswald Danes surviving execution by lethal injection due to death spontaneously ceasing. His lawyers successfully advance a force majeure argument; as a result, the Governor of Kentucky is forced to release Danes on parole. Danes accepts an offer of representation from public relations guru Jilly Kitzinger (Lauren Ambrose) after his fame leads to him being assaulted in public, leading to him becoming a spokesman for Phicorp, a drug company hoping to capitalise on the absence of death. During Torchwood's investigations into PhiCorp, Jack Harkness (John Barrowman) confronts Danes, who brags about killing his student, calling it "the best moment of my life". Tensions arise between Kitzinger and Danes when he is eclipsed in the media by Tea Party politician Ellis Hartley Monroe (Mare Winningham) and her "Dead is Dead" campaign. Danes launches an ad hoc publicity stunt; a video of Danes holding and comforting a baby girl goes viral and results in Monroe's media attention waning. At the "Miracle Rally" held by PhiCorp in Los Angeles Danes gives an impassioned speech, stating his belief that humanity had evolved into "everlasting angels" and revels in the audience chanting his name.

Danes' brief media career comes to an end in "End of the Road". While at a hotel in Dallas, Texas a prostitute named Claire (Megan M. Duffy) tells him that he is due to be classified as "Category Zero". Kitzinger reveals that this is a ruling that would have convicted criminals like Danes incinerated, and that his 15 minutes of fame are over. Danes smuggles himself into Wales, where he arrives at the home of Torchwood agent Gwen Cooper (Eve Myles). Having stolen Kitzinger's laptop, Danes reveals that she left clues to the location of "the Blessing" in mistranslated news stories from China and Argentina. Fearful that Rhys (Kai Owen), Gwen's husband and father of their daughter, may murder Danes, she and Harkness take him to Shanghai. In "The Blood Line" Harkness straps Danes with explosives and uses him as insurance against his and Gwen's lives as they face the Families, the perpetrators of the 'Miracle'. When death is restored, Danes detains the Mother (Frances Fisher), the leader of the families, before detonating them both. With his last words he states that he will again pursue "bad little girls" in Hell.

== Casting and characterisation ==
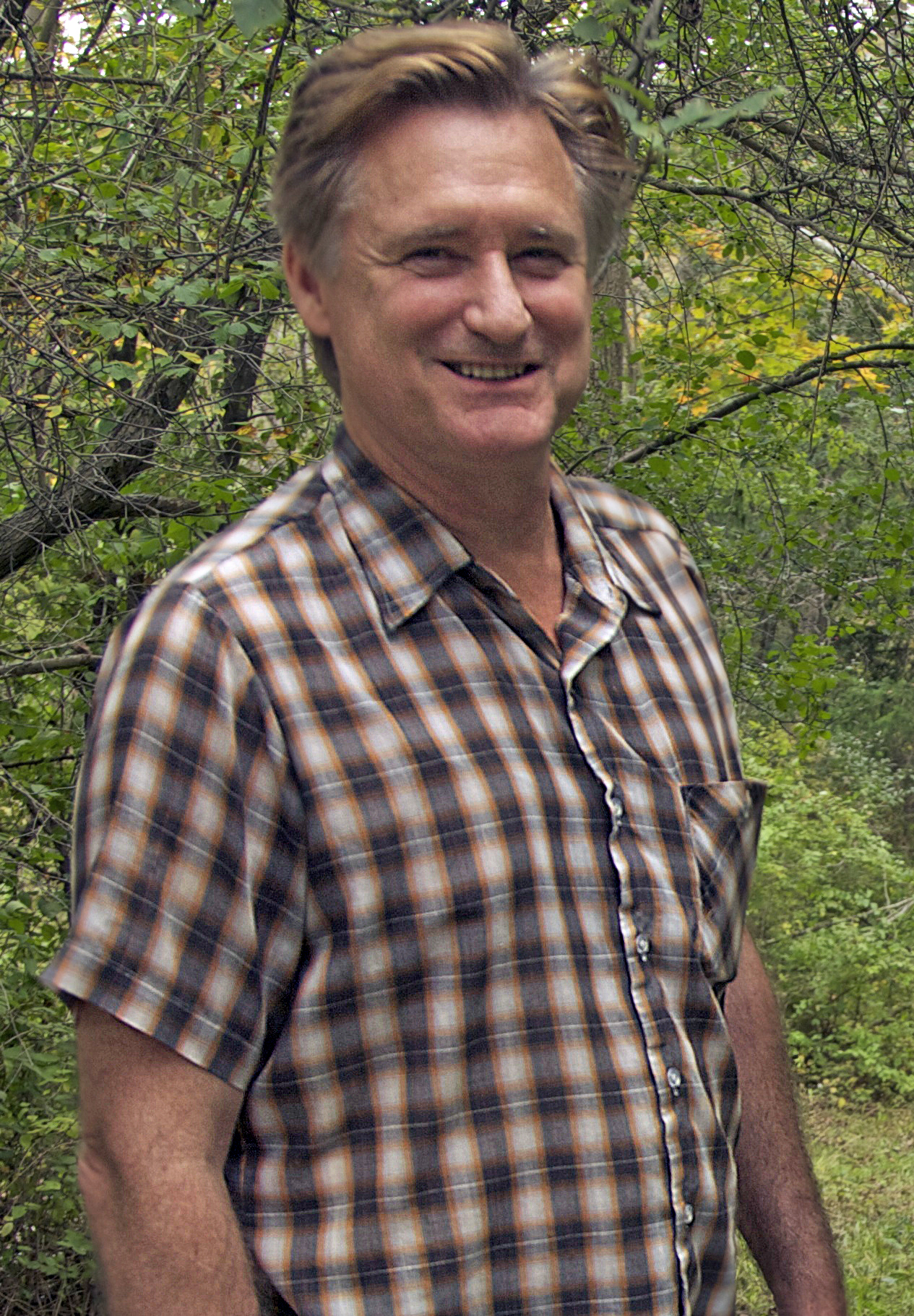
The Torchwood production team had sought to cast Bill Pullman (pictured) because of their perception of him as "America's Sweetheart".

SFX magazine noted that when the character was first announced, some members of the public questioned the morality of featuring such a character in a science fiction action series. In August 2010 a reporter from entertainment website AfterElton also stated to the shows executive producers that some of their readers had been upset and concerned about details of the storyline. Pullman's casting as Danes was announced on 15 December 2010. Prior to his role as Danes, Pullman was best known to audiences for his portrayal of the President of the United States in Independence Day. When Pullman asked executive producer Julie Gardner why the production team sought to cast him in role, she replied that it was because he was perceived as "America's sweetheart", which he interpreted to mean they were looking to destabilise viewers. Torchwood's creator, Russell T Davies, noted that upon expressing an interest in casting Pullman, he was told "you haven't got a chance." Though Pullman was aware of Torchwood, having had a friend who'd "evangelized" the series, he had not watched the series before being cast. Upon reading the scripts, Pullman commented that he had been impressed at how well the series "knows itself" and the strength of each character's individual voice. In an interview with Zap2it, he remarked that he thought he was given the best role in the series. Pullman noted that he was prepared for the role, having played other troubled characters in the past, and re-iterated that it was the writing that attracted him to the part, adding "I don't think I could do a child murderer just for a child murderer's sake".

io9 felt the character of Danes to be a cross between Freddy Krueger and Jesus. Commenting on the Christ comparison, Pullman felt that his character was sort of the "doppelganger of Jesus or something." He stated of Danes: "It's like he's been out in the desert, and he comes back in, and there is a certain kind of way in which he still has pride." SFX described Danes' journey as one from a Hannibal Lecter type character to a Billy Graham or messianic figure. Pullman observed that Oswald's failure to die "becomes the pivot for a whole world that has changed"; feeling that his character was an intelligent one who knows he can provide a message people want to hear. Discussing Danes' fall from grace, series writer Jane Espenson explains that "humanity doesn't seize on heroes for the long–term", and that Danes' descent from fame was a way to make his arc more realistic. Though Danes dies helping the Torchwood team, Espenson remarked that "we didn't want to outright redeem this horrible, horrible man" commenting that his death is intended as "redemption and comeuppance both." The Independent's Neela Debnath observed that whilst the character of Danes had "become likeable in an odd-sort of way" his last scenes "reiterated just how despicable he was" and that it was the right time for him to depart the cast.

== Reception ==
Charlie Jane Anders of io9 commented enthusiastically on Danes' portrayal, stating that "perhaps the greatest miracle in Torchwood: Miracle Day is Bill Pullman's performance." Anders cited that the character's journey "seems bizarre and unlikely, but Pullman makes it work." Mikey O'Connell from Zap2it likened Pullman's performance to that of John Lithgow as The Trinity Killer in Dexter, both having the sense of "the familiar, comforting actor you've watched for decades" being "hijacked by someone else." In a review of the first episode, Dan Martin from The Guardian opined that Pullman "stole the show as manipulative psychopath Oswald Danes" predicting "his character might give us one of the most compelling narratives." Reviewing the fifth episode of the series The Independent's Neela Debnath said of Pullman that "thus far he has given an extraordinary turn as Danes, which at times has veered towards hammy territory but has never entered it." However, Debnath felt that with a key sequence where Danes makes a public speech "the line was finally crossed", believing the sequence "clichéd" and that it was "improbable that he could instantaneously win over an angry lynch mob in moments."

The Daily Telegraph's Gavin Fuller praised Pullman's portrayal of Danes, singling it out as the strongest of the series next to lead female actor Eve Myles. Fuller also felt that giving such an unlikeable character a prominent focus and allowing him a shot at redemption in the final episode "was certainly a brave move from Davies." In a post-series review of what worked and what did not during Torchwood's fourth series, Digital Spy's Morgan Jeffrey stated that "Bill Pullman made the most of his tenure as Oswald Danes, being both extremely charismatic and utterly repellent throughout." Jeffrey stated that "we never like Oswald, but Pullman's layered performance ensures that we do often sympathise with him, before having the rug pulled swiftly out from under us as he commits yet another heinous crime." For his performance as Danes, Pullman received a Saturn Award nomination for Best Supporting Actor in Television.
