= Nana Visitor =

American actress (born 1957)

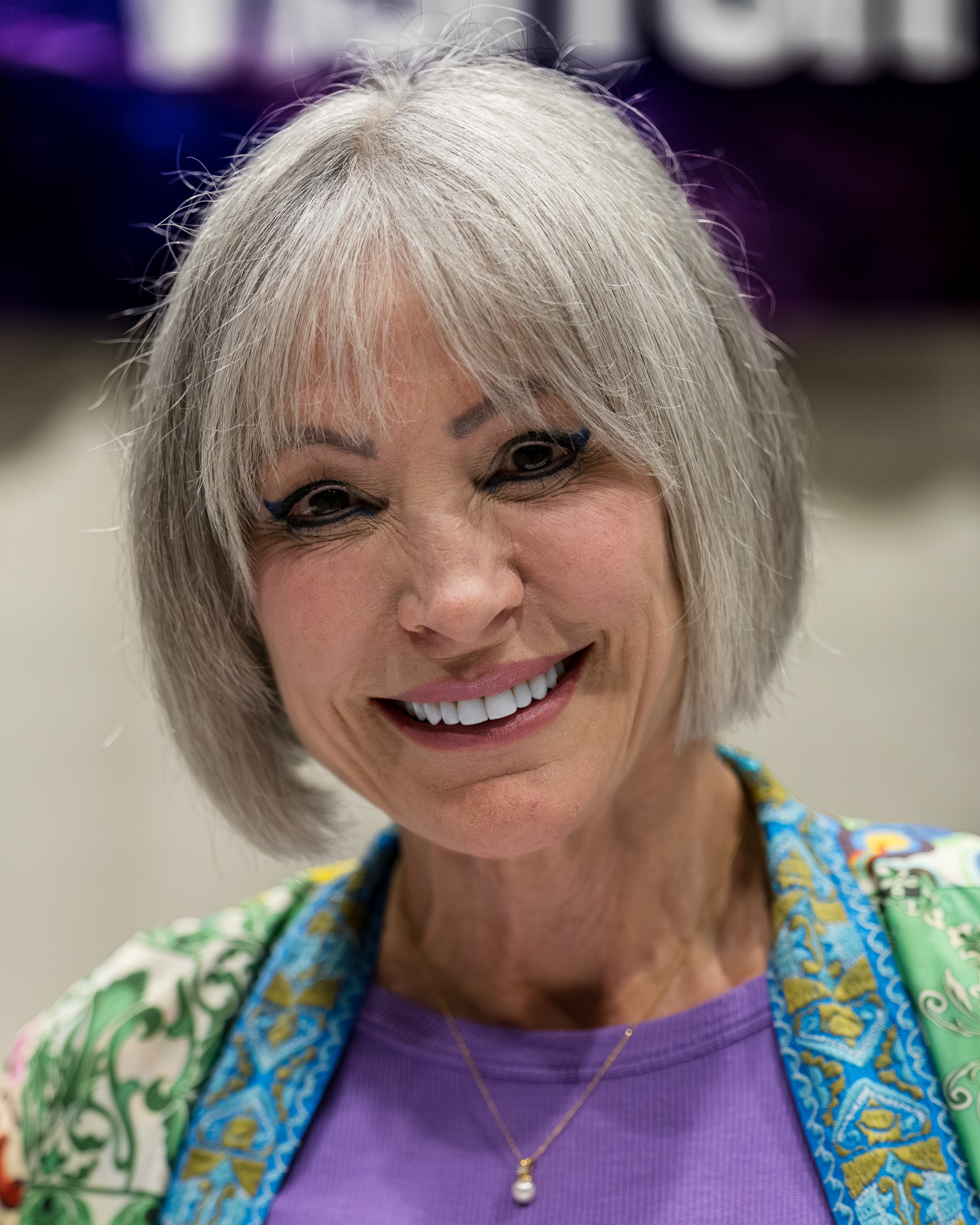
- Visitor at GalaxyCon Oklahoma City in 2026
- Born: Nana Tucker; July 26, 1957 (age 69); New York City, U.S.
- Occupation: Actress
- Years active: 1976–present
- Spouses: Nicholas Miscusi (m. 1989; div. 1994) Alexander Siddig (m. 1997; div. 2001) Matthew Rimmer (m. 2003; div. 2007)
- Children: 2
- Relatives: Paris Theodore (half-brother); Cyd Charisse (aunt)

Nana Visitor (/nəˈnɑː/ nə-NAH; born Nana Tucker, July 26, 1957) is an American actress, best known for playing Major, later Colonel, Kira Nerys in the television series Star Trek: Deep Space Nine and Jean Ritter in the television series Wildfire.

== Early life ==
Nana Tucker was born July 26, 1957, in New York City, the daughter of Nenette Charisse, a ballet teacher, and Robert Tucker, a choreographer; she is a niece of actress/dancer Cyd Charisse.

== Career ==
Visitor began her acting career in the 1970s on the Broadway stage in such productions as My One and Only. Her film debut (billed by her birth name, Nana Tucker) came in the 1977 horror film The Sentinel. On television, Visitor co-starred in the short-lived 1976 sitcom Ivan the Terrible and from 1978 to 1982, had short-lived regular roles on three soap operas: Ryan's Hope, The Doctors, and One Life to Live. Upon the suggestion of her older brother Paris, she adopted the stage name "Nana Visitor" in the early 1980s, and had her name legally changed to "Visitor" some time later.

In 1984, she appeared in a season-two episode of Hunter. In 1985, Visitor made appearances on the television series MacGyver, in the season-one episode "Hellfire" as Laura Farren, and in the season-two episode "DOA: MacGyver" as Carol Varnay. She also made an appearance in the fourth-season Remington Steele episode titled "Steele Blushing" the same year. In 1986, she appeared in "Hills of Fire", a fourth-season episode of Knight Rider, as well as third-season Highway to Heaven episodes "Love at Second Sight" and "Love and Marriage, Part II" as Margaret Swann.

In 1987, Visitor appeared as Ellen Dolan in a failed television pilot for Will Eisner's pulp comic creation The Spirit, starring Sam J. Jones as the title character and Garry Walberg as her father, Commissioner Dolan.

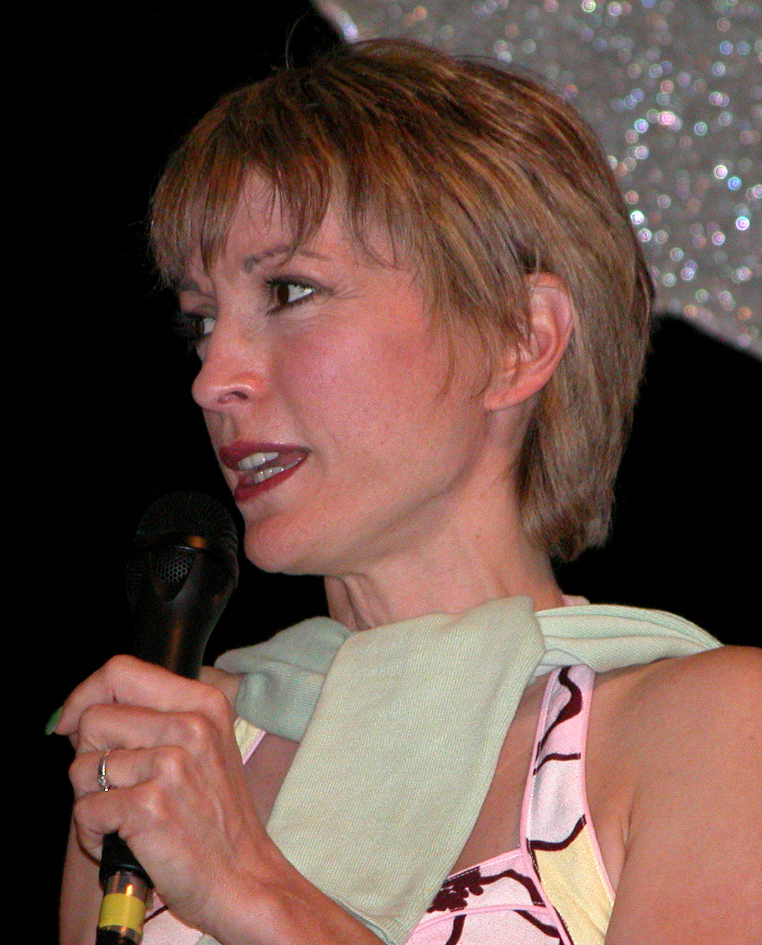
Visitor at STICCon XVIII (2004)

In 1988, she made an appearance on the sitcom Night Court as a mental patient who is obsessed with the movies. That same year, she made an appearance on the television series In the Heat of the Night as the owner of the Sparta newspaper. She also made an appearance that year in an episode of Matlock. In 1989, Visitor appeared in the fifth episode of the television series Doogie Howser, M.D. as Charmagne, a rock star who has a throat nodule removed at Doogie's hospital, and as Miles Drentell's glamorous girlfriend, in "Success", a 1989 episode of Thirtysomething's second season.

In 1990, Visitor co-starred with Sandra Bullock in the short-lived sitcom Working Girl, which was based on the feature film of the same name.

From 1993 to 1999, Visitor appeared in Star Trek: Deep Space Nine as Major (later Colonel) Kira Nerys, a former freedom fighter/terrorist from the planet Bajor, who fought against the occupation of her world by the Cardassians. After the occupation ended, she was appointed as first officer of the series's eponymous space station, built by the Cardassians and turned over to Starfleet. She revisited the character, as a voice actress, in the third season of the animated series Star Trek: Lower Decks. She was also interested to play the character of Kathryn Janeway in the series Star Trek: Voyager, filmed at the same time.

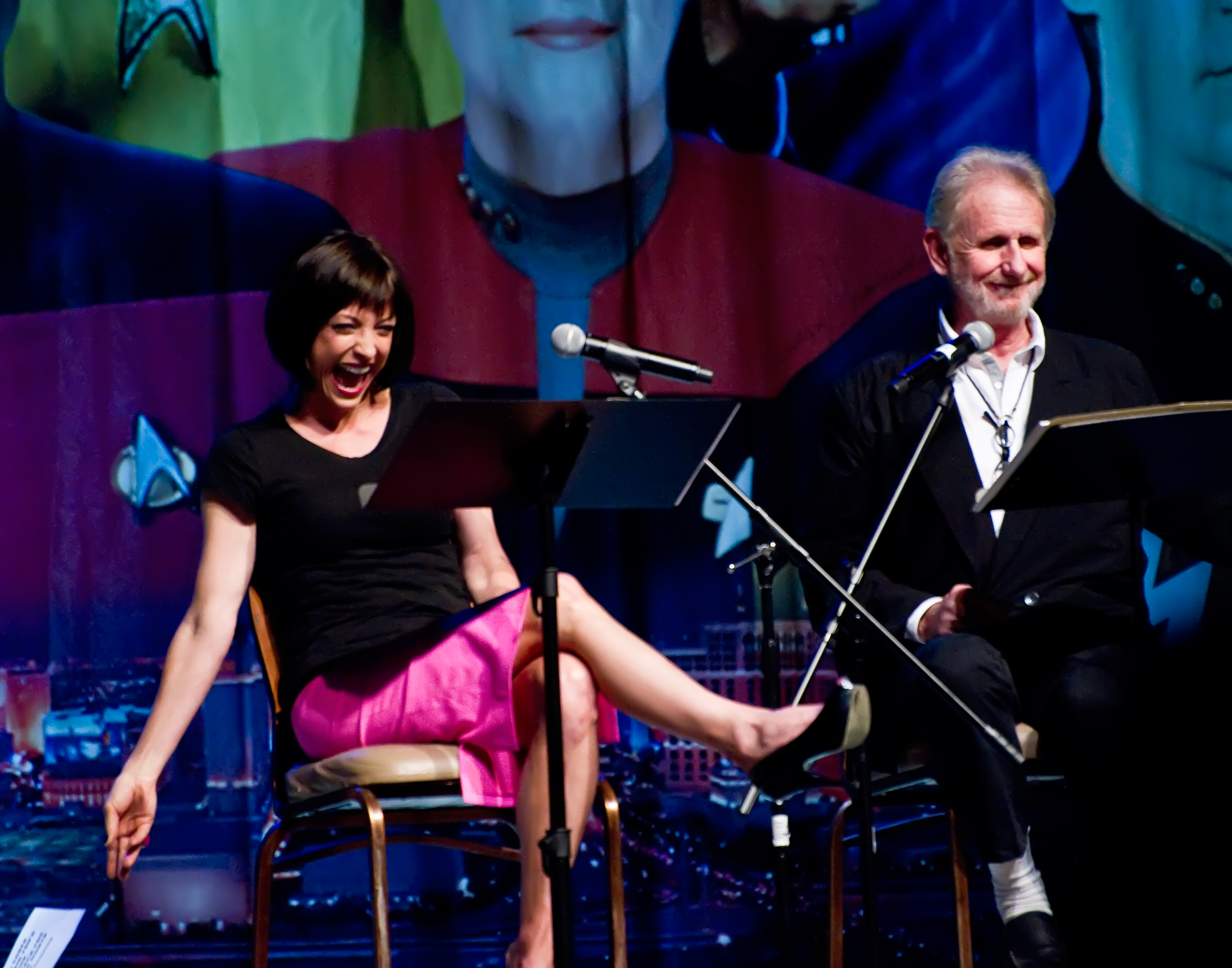
Nana Visitor and Rene Auberjonois at the 2011 Star Trek convention in Las Vegas

After DS9 ended, Visitor had a recurring role as villain Dr. Elizabeth Renfro on the television series Dark Angel. Visitor then starred as Roxie Hart in both the touring and Broadway companies of the musical Chicago, including starring as Hart as curtains rose again after September 11, 2001. Visitor was then cast as Jean Ritter on the ABC Family series Wildfire, which premiered on June 20, 2005.

In 2008, she appeared as Emily Kowalski, a dying cancer patient in "Faith", an episode of the reimagined Battlestar Galactica's fourth season. Visitor had a small role as Pamela Voorhees in the 2009 version of Friday the 13th. She has also lent her voice in a few appearances on the sitcom Family Guy, such as Rita in the episode "Brian's Got a Brand New Bag", and as the voice of the Enterprise in "Extra Large Medium." In 2011, she had a small part in the Hammer Horror film The Resident, playing the realtor. She appeared in Torchwood: Miracle Day episodes seven ("Immortal Sins") and eight ("End of the Road"). In 2012, she appeared as Dr. Patty Barker, a canine psychotherapist, in "An Embarrassment of Bitches", a season-four episode of ABC's Castle.

2024 saw the publication of her book, "Star Trek: Open a Channel: A Woman's Trek", a look at the female characters of the Star Trek franchise, and the actors who portrayed them.

== Personal life ==
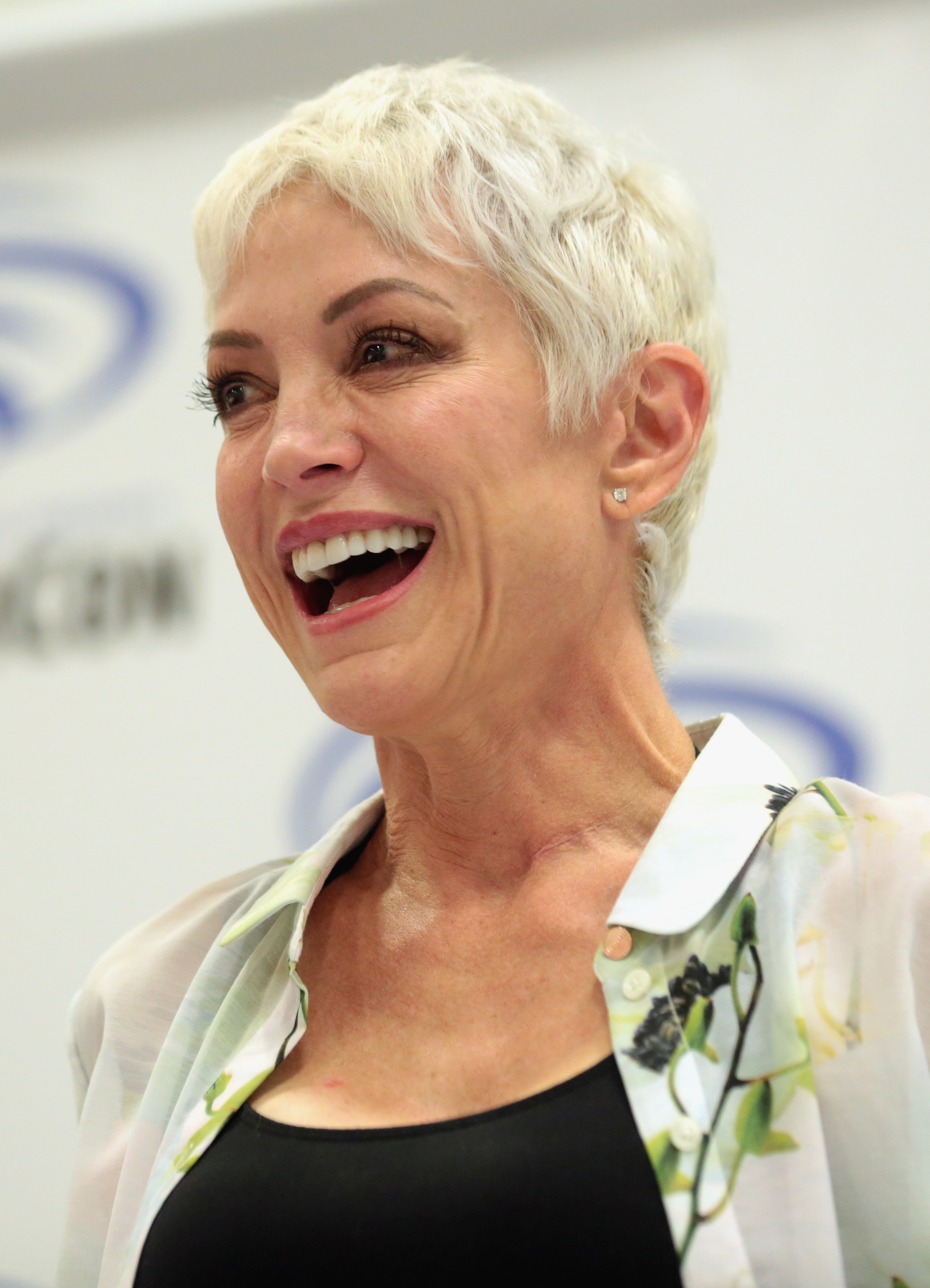
Nana Visitor at the 2018 WonderCon

Visitor was married to actor, producer, director, dancer, singer, and musician Nicholas Miscusi from 1989 to 1994. They have one son together. Visitor began dating her Star Trek: Deep Space Nine co-star Alexander Siddig and married him in June 1997. They divorced in April 2001. They also have a son together, and her pregnancy was incorporated into her character and the series storyline, beginning in the 1996 fourth season episode "Body Parts". She gave birth to her son during production of the episode "The Assignment", though her character would remain pregnant until the fifth-season episode "The Begotten". In early 2002, Visitor became engaged to Matthew Rimmer, previously company manager for the musical Chicago, and from 2017 chief operating officer of The Broad Stage in Santa Monica. They married in April 2003. Their relationship ended in 2007.

Visitor and her Star Trek: Deep Space Nine co-star Terry Farrell were honored in 2001 when William Kwong Yu Yeung named two small Solar System bodies he had discovered after them – asteroid 26733 Nanavisitor and asteroid 26734 Terryfarrell.

== Filmography ==
=== Film ===
Year	Title	Role
1977	The Sentinel	Girl
1987	The Spirit	Ellen Dolan
2008	Babysitter Wanted	Linda Albright
2008	Swing Vote	Galena Greenleaf
2009	Friday the 13th	Pamela Voorhees
2011	The Resident	Realtor
2015	A Rising Tide	Eva
2015	Ted 2	Adoption agent
2018	A Bread Factory	Elsa

=== Television ===
Year	Title	Role	Notes
1976	Ivan the Terrible	Svetlana Petrovsky	5 episodes
1978–79	Ryan's Hope	Nancy Feldman	Unknown episodes
1980–81	The Doctors	Darcy Ann Collins	Unknown episodes
1982	One Life to Live	Georgina Whitman	Unknown episodes
1985	Hunter	Amy Laurton	Episode: "The Biggest Man In Town"
1985	MacGyver	Laura Farren	Episode: "Hellfire"
1985	Remington Steele	Eileen Fitzgerald	Episode: "Steele Blushing"
1986	Knight Rider	Sandra Rusk	Episode: "Hills of Fire"
1986	Alfred Hitchcock Presents	Doris	Episode: "Happy Birthday"
1986	Highway to Heaven	Margaret Swann	2 episodes
1987	Ohara	Laura	Episode: "Laura"
1987	MacGyver	Carol Varnay	Episode: "D.O.A.: MacGyver"
1987	Matlock	Vanessa Douglas	Episode: "The Best Friend"
1987	The Colbys	Georgina Sinclair	4 episodes
1987	Scarecrow and Mrs. King	Felicia McMasters	Episode: "Do You Take This Spy?"
1988	Night Court	Ms. Sanders	Episode: "Educating Rhoda"
1988	In the Heat of the Night	Evie	Episode: "Fate"
1988	L.A. Law	Betsy Major	Episode: "Sperminator"
1989	Matlock	Erin Whitley / Shannon Blackwell	Episode: "The Other Woman"
1989	Doogie Howser, M.D.	Charmagne	Episode: "The Short Goodbye"
1990	Working Girl	Bryn Newhouse	Unknown episodes
1990	Murder, She Wrote	Marcia McPhee	Episode: "See You in Court, Baby"
1991	Drexell's Class	Helen Selwyn	Episode: "Love Walked Right in and Swept Mr. Drexell Away"
1993	Matlock	Dr. Clara Farmington	Episode: "The Divorce"
1993–1999	Star Trek: Deep Space Nine	Major, later Colonel, Kira Nerys	Main cast, OFTA Television Award for Best Actress in a Syndicated Series
1998	The Outer Limits	Cecilia Fairman	Episode: "In Our Own Image"
2001	Dark Angel	Elizabeth Renfro	6 episodes
2003	Frasier	Sharon	Episode: "Daphne Does Dinner"
2004	CSI: Crime Scene Investigation	Mrs. Katz	Episode: "Mea Culpa"
2004	According to Jim	Veronica	Episode: "Who's the Boss?"
2005–2008	Wildfire	Jean Ritter	Unknown episodes
2008	Battlestar Galactica	Emily Kowalski	Episode: "Faith"
2009–2014	Family Guy	Rita/Woman in restaurant/Nancy Pelosi/Justin's Mom/Kate's Mom (voices)	12 episodes
2011	Torchwood: Miracle Day	Olivia Colasanto	Episodes: "Immortal Sins", "End of the Road"
2011	Grimm	Melissa Wincroft	Episode: "Beeware"
2012	Castle	Dr. Patty Barker	Episode: "An Embarrassment of Bitches"
2017	Dynasty	Diana Davis	Episode: "Company Slut"
2018	Killer in Law	Grandma Yvonne Hutcherson	Lifetime TV movie
2022	Star Trek: Lower Decks	Kira Nerys	Episode: "Hear All, Trust Nothing"

=== Stage ===
Year	Title	Role	Broadway venue
1983	My One and Only	Flounder	St. James Theatre
2001	Chicago	Roxie Hart, replacement	Shubert Theatre

=== Video games ===
Year	Title	Role
1996	Star Trek: Deep Space Nine - Harbinger	Kira Nerys
2000	Star Trek: Deep Space Nine - The Fallen	Kira Nerys
2018	Star Trek Online - Victory is Life	Kira Nerys
2023	Starfield	Mom

=== Web series ===
Year	Title	Role	Notes
2016	Full Out	Xan	Featured cast

== Awards and nominations ==
Year	Award	Category	Nominated work	Result
1995	Sci-Fi Universe Magazine, USA; Universe Reader's Choice	Best Supporting Actress in a Genre TV Series	Star Trek: Deep Space Nine	Won
1996	Online Film & Television Association Television Award	Best Supporting Actress in a Series	Star Trek: Deep Space Nine	Nominated
1997	Online Film & Television Association Television Award	Best Actress in a Syndicated Series	Star Trek: Deep Space Nine	Won
1997	Online Film & Television Association Television Award	Best Supporting Actress in a Drama Series	Star Trek: Deep Space Nine	Nominated
1997	Online Film & Television Association Television Award	Best Supporting Actress in a Series	Star Trek: Deep Space Nine	Nominated
1998	Online Film & Television Association Television Award	Best Supporting Actress in a Syndicated Series	Star Trek: Deep Space Nine	Won
1998	Online Film & Television Association Television Award	Best Supporting Actress in a Series	Star Trek: Deep Space Nine	Nominated
1999	Online Film & Television Association Television Award	Best Actress in a Syndicated Series	Star Trek: Deep Space Nine	Won
1999	Online Film & Television Association Television Award	Best Supporting Actress in a Drama Series	Star Trek: Deep Space Nine	Nominated

== Bibliography ==
- Visitor, Nana (2024). Star Trek: Open a Channel: A Woman's Trek. Insight Editions. ISBN 979-8886633016.
