= Rendition (Torchwood) =

2011 Torchwood episode

33 – "Rendition"
- Torchwood episode

Cast
- Starring: John Barrowman – Captain Jack Harkness; Eve Myles – Gwen Cooper; Mekhi Phifer – Rex Matheson; Alexa Havins – Esther Drummond; Kai Owen – Rhys Williams; Bill Pullman – Oswald Danes
- Others: Lauren Ambrose – Jilly Kitzinger; Arlene Tur – Vera Juarez; Dichen Lachman – Lyn Peterfield; Marina Benedict – Charlotte Wills; Paul James – Noah Vickers; Tom Price – Sergeant Andy Davidson; Wayne Knight – Brian Friedkin; Tug Coker – Geoff Reed; Halley Feiffer – Lianna; Finn Wittrock – Danny; Richard Augustine – George Sayer; Amy Benedict – Bridget Howe; Sedly Bloomfield – Man No. 2; Antonio D. Charity – Airport Security Cop; Erin Chenoweth – Greta; Ewan Chung – Yu-King So; Rachel Leah Cohen – Laurie; Joseph Eid – Man No. 1; Chrissie Fit – Assistant; Bari Hochwald – ER Nurse; Scott Hoxby – Paul Goldstein; Ronobir Lahiri – Simran Baidwan; Don Luce – Gate Guard; David O'Donnell – Dr. Mandel; Jeffery Self – James Percey; Kristi Swensson – Woman; Luke White – EMT; A.J. Tannen – Government Clerk; Glenn Taranto – Security Chief; Richard Wharton – Dr. Paul Bell

Production
- Directed by: Billy Gierhart
- Written by: Doris Egan
- Produced by: Kelly A. Manners
- Executive producers: Russell T Davies; Julie Gardner; Jane Tranter; Doris Egan (co-executive); Vlad Wolynetz (co-executive)
- Music by: Murray Gold
- Production code: 102
- Series: Miracle Day
- Running time: 54 mins
- First broadcast: 15 July 2011 (US); 21 July 2011 (UK)

Chronology
← Preceded by "The New World"	Followed by → "Dead of Night"

"Rendition" is the second episode of Torchwood: Miracle Day, the fourth series of the British science fiction television series Torchwood. It was originally broadcast in the United States on Starz on 15 July 2011, in Canada on Space on 16 July 2011, and in the United Kingdom on BBC One on 21 July 2011.

Torchwood: Miracle Day follows the aftermath of a day where humanity has stopped being able to die. In the episode, Central Intelligence Agency agent Rex Matheson (Mekhi Phifer) takes Torchwood team members Jack Harkness (John Barrowman), who is the only mortal human, and Gwen Cooper (Eve Myles) on a plane to the United States. During the flight, a traitor in the CIA (Dichen Lachman) poisons Jack with arsenic and Rex, helped by Dr. Vera Juarez (Arlene Tur), find an antidote using only items found on the plane.

== Plot ==
Rex has Jack and Gwen board a plane headed to Washington, D.C., with fellow CIA agent Lyn Peterfield escorting them. However, Gwen's husband Rhys and their daughter Anwen are forced to stay in the UK. Back in Washington, D.C., because no one can die due to the Miracle, Dr. Vera Juarez has her hospital staff focus on treating the least wounded first so they can get them out quickly and have enough beds to treat newer patients.

After his release, Oswald is being interviewed on a local talk show but doesn't say much since there is a campaign to have him returned to prison and anything he might say might be used against him. But when the reporter shows him a picture of the girl he murdered, Oswald starts to break down and cries, apologising to the girl and revealing he was too scared to apologise to the victim's mother, which earns him sympathy from some viewers. As he's about to leave the TV station, PR agent Jilly Kitzinger congratulates him on his interview and offers to be his agent but he declines, after which a TV staffer tells Oswald that Oprah Winfrey wants to do an interview with him.

Meanwhile, Vera attends a medical conference where doctors are trying to figure out the Miracle. When a doctor tweets that his hospital needs more antibiotics, Vera realises because nobody is dying, people who were supposed to die have become living incubators for bacteria which allows them to grow and become resistant to antibiotics. What's worse, the Miracle is not true immortality as people still age and grow old. With fears that supplies will dwindle as the undying grows, Vera suggests that hospitals need more painkillers to handle this situation. Later, Vera meets Jilly who actually works for a pharmaceutical company called PhiCorp and convinces Vera that they can work together as she can help her.

When Director Brian Friedkin suspects Esther and Rex may know too much about Torchwood, he has their security clearances deleted, frames them as spies working for China and orders Lyn to kill Jack with an arsenic pill. However, Esther manages to escape before the CIA catches her and tries to warn Rex. Back on the plane, Jack realises that he's being poisoned, at which point both Gwen and Rex apprehend Lyn. As Jack is slowly being killed by the arsenic, Rex calls Vera for help. With the help of her fellow doctors at the medical conference and the air stewards on their plane, Rex and Gwen successfully create an antidote and administer it to Jack.

When Jack, Gwen, Rex and Lyn arrive at the airport, they are met by a group of CIA agents, unaware that they are under orders by Friedkin to arrest the three and free Lyn. Esther manages to warn Rex at which point he, Jack and Gwen subdue the agents and escape. During the fight Rex twists Lyn's head and breaks her neck. When the three exit the airport, they are greeted by Vera with Rex's painkillers, and Esther, who is their getaway driver. They are about to leave when Lyn, still alive but with her head twisted around 180 degrees, appears in front of them. She is unable to stop them due to her condition, and they are able to drive off.

== Broadcast ==
This episode was broadcast on Starz in the US on Friday 15 July. It was aired in the UK on BBC 1 on Thursday 21 July. International broadcasters in Canada and Australia received the show on Saturday 16 July, where it was broadcast on Australia's UKTV network.

Entertainment Weekly reported that this episode on Starz was watched by "1.4 million this weekend, down about 30 percent [sic] from last week's debut."

== Reception ==
Chris Swanson from WhatCulture gave the episode 4 stars, saying:

I liked this episode. It wasn’t exactly action-packed or anything like that, but it did feature some nice moments, like a conversation between Gwen and Jack about how dangerous being around him is (shades of similar conversations on Doctor Who).

I also very much liked that they are continuing to examine the logistics of exactly what would happen in a situation like this. No one has yet suggested mandatory birth control, but we do see discussions about the fact that the entire medical industry would have to change from a life-saving position to one that’s more about pain management.
