= The New World (Torchwood) =

2011 Torchwood episode

32 – "The New World"
- Torchwood episode

Cast
- Starring: John Barrowman – Captain Jack Harkness; Eve Myles – Gwen Cooper; Mekhi Phifer – Rex Matheson; Alexa Havins – Esther Drummond; Kai Owen – Rhys Williams; Bill Pullman – Oswald Danes
- Others: Arlene Tur – Vera Juarez; Paul James – Noah Vickers; Marina Benedict – Charlotte Willis; Brian Guest – Mr Peterson; Sharon Morgan – Mary Cooper; William Thomas – Geraint Cooper; Tom Price – Sergeant Davidson; Penny Bunton – Female Hiker; Ron Butler – Senior Professor; Jim Castillo – Male Anchor #2; Rick Chambers – Senior Male Anchor; Hymnson Chan – Male Nurse; Ellen Fox – TV Journalist; Laura Gardner – Female Expert; Lauri Hendler – Angry Nurse; Carla Jeffery – Teenage Girl; Clint Jung – Male Professor; Charlene Lovings – Nurse; Jessica Mathews – Female Anchor #3; Rocky McMurray – Senior Guard; Laura Morgan – Flight Attendant; Phil Nice – Male Hiker; Bunnie Rivera – Rosita; Robin Sachs – British Professor; Heather Ann Smith – Joan Cabina; Jackie Torres – Female Anchor #2; Nischelle Turner – Female Anchor; David Grant Wright – Male Anchor

Production
- Directed by: Bharat Nalluri
- Written by: Russell T Davies
- Produced by: Kelly A. Manners; Brian Minchin (UK unit)
- Executive producers: Russell T Davies; Julie Gardner; Jane Tranter; Bharat Nalluri; Vlad Wolynetz (co-executive)
- Music by: Murray Gold
- Production code: 101
- Series: Miracle Day
- Running time: 50 mins
- First broadcast: 8 July 2011 (US); 14 July 2011 (UK)

Chronology
← Preceded by Children of Earth (serial)	Followed by → "Rendition"

"The New World" is the first episode of Torchwood: Miracle Day, the fourth and final series of the British science fiction television series Torchwood. It was first broadcast in the United States on Starz on 8 July 2011, in Canada on Space on 9 July 2011, and in the United Kingdom on BBC One on 14 July 2011. It introduced Rex Matheson, Esther Drummond and Oswald Danes to the cast.

Torchwood: Miracle Day follows the aftermath of a day where humanity has stopped being able to die. In the episode, the last of a disbanded team called Torchwood becomes active again after an email at the start of this "Miracle Day" is sent to intelligence agencies containing the word "Torchwood".

== Plot ==
=== Synopsis ===
In Kentucky, convicted child molester and murderer Oswald Danes (Bill Pullman) is due to be executed by means of lethal injection. However, the execution fails. At the start of "Miracle Day", a mysterious email is sent to members of the intelligence agencies in the U.S., bypassing the usual security protocols and containing only the word "Torchwood". CIA agent Rex Matheson (Mekhi Phifer) is badly injured in a car crash whilst receiving information on Torchwood from Esther Drummond (Alexa Havins), and is taken to a hospital in Washington, D.C., where he is treated by surgeon Vera Juarez (Arlene Tur). Vera informs Esther that Rex has survived, and also that not one single person has died in the past 24 hours at any U.S. hospital. This information leads to the discussion of the "miracle" on international news and social networking sites.

Individuals can still become sick and injured, but continue to live regardless. As Esther investigates the remaining files on Torchwood in the CIA archives, Jack Harkness (John Barrowman) appears in the U.S. to deal with Esther, after erasing all online mentions of Torchwood. Jack saves her from an assassin, who later blows up a portion of the CIA archives in an attempted suicide bombing to prevent himself being interrogated by Jack. Jack gives Esther an amnesia pill while explaining the nature of Torchwood to her, and she subsequently forgets about her encounter with Jack, though her memories of Torchwood itself are triggered by a file brought to her by CIA agent Noah Vickers. The assassin, who "survived" his attempted suicide, is brought to the same hospital where Rex is recovering. Rex hacks into the security cameras in order to observe the "autopsy", which Jack has also infiltrated using the alias of his deceased friend Owen Harper. While the assassin is little more than a charred skeleton, he remains conscious during the procedure, even after the doctor removes his head at Jack's suggestion.

Oswald meets a representative of the Governor of Kentucky who has come to apologize for any pain Oswald suffered during his failed execution, but Oswald demands that he should be released since he technically already served his sentence or else he will sue the State for breaching his Eighth and Fifth Amendment rights for unlawful imprisonment and unnecessary pain. Realizing the lawsuit could cost millions for the State, the Governor reluctantly releases Oswald due to Force majeure, much to public anger.

In Wales, former Torchwood operative and young mother Gwen Cooper (Eve Myles) is called out of exile by her old colleague Andy Davidson (Tom Price), who informs her that her father Geraint (William Thomas) has had two heart attacks, but has not died. Gwen is persuaded not to investigate the strange events any further by her husband Rhys Williams (Kai Owen), but Rex links Torchwood with the worldwide miracle and, with Esther's help, tracks Gwen down using the phone call data from Davidson's phone.

Upon arriving at Gwen's seaside house, a helicopter arrives with the intention of incapacitating Gwen. Gwen fights off the helicopter, and escapes with the help of Jack, who has arrived to watch out for her. The remaining members of Torchwood escape to Roald Dahl Plass, the site of the original Torchwood 3 hub, where Jack reveals that he hasn't healed from an injury sustained at the CIA archives, which his immortal nature should have quickly healed. He concludes that whatever caused the miracle has restored his humanity and mortality, just as the entire populace is now immortal. Gwen discusses what actions they should take, but is interrupted by the arrival of the South Wales Police force and Rex's announcement that he is renditioning the Torchwood team to the U.S..

== Reception and broadcast ==
On BBC One the episode attracted a consolidated audience of 6.59 million which is slightly higher than the figure for the opening episode of the previous series, Children of Earth, and an AI rating of 85 out of 100, considered "excellent". When premiered on Space in Canada, the episode drew in nearly a million viewers with an average of 432,000, the highest the channel has ever had for a show. For the Starz debut in America a combined audience (the original 9pm broadcast and the 11pm repeat) of 1.51 million viewers tuned in, meaning the show was on a par with the network's highest recorded audience, which is held by Camelot. In the United Kingdom the show had 840,000 iPlayer requests in July, making it the most requested programme behind episodes of The Apprentice and Top Gear, and eight most requested broadcast overall.

The episode received positive reviews. CraveOnline said "it's good to see John Barrowman easily step back into his iconic character", giving the episode 8 out of 10. Entertainment Weekly described it as "witty and successful" before adding that it "makes a smooth transatlantic shift" and awarding it a A− score. USA Today was equally positive in its review saying that it "dazzles in its Starz premiere" while also being "suspenseful, exciting and flat-out fun". The New York Post added "lots of action, lots of shoot-'em-ups and lots of big explosions that don't kill anybody. It's also lots of fun" while The Hollywood Reporter was critical of the show for "inserting American actors into a British franchise" but still suggested that Miracle Day "has enough compelling elements to make both newbies and die-hards stick through the bumpy parts for the payoff".

HitFix was more equivocal on the episode saying that "it aims high, and wide, and near and far, and if it doesn't hit all of its many targets, it hits several" before concluding "that's probably enough to justify the time and expense everyone put into bringing "Torchwood" more firmly onto American soil". Across the Atlantic British critics also praised the episode with The Mirror's Jane Simon praising its new larger budget as a mean to bring in "Hollywood blockbusters" as co-stars such as Phifer and Pullman to accompany Barrowman and Myles. Seenit was keen to praise the "genius" of writer Russell T Davies while complimenting Torchwood on outshining "almost anything else the BBC is offering, including its parent show" while SFX awarded the episode four stars saying "as an hour's worth of gripping entertainment, Miracle Day "The New World" is hard to beat".

== Trailer ==
The BBC One broadcast ended with a three-minute trailer to compensate for the time differences between American and British broadcast times.

The trailer featured scenes from the next four episodes with citizens being placed in 'Overflow Camps' by PhiCorp, a fictional Pharmaceutical company, while various explosions, of both buildings and cars, feature alongside shots of Oswald Danes claiming knowledge into the origins of Miracle Day and a cult named The Soulless walking the streets of major cities.
