= Rhys Williams (Torchwood) =

Fictional character of Torchwood

- Torchwood character
- First appearance: "Everything Changes"
- Last appearance: "The Blood Line"
- Portrayed by: Kai Owen

In-universe information
- Affiliation: Torchwood Institute
- Family: Barry Williams (father); Brenda Williams (mother)
- Spouse: Gwen Cooper
- Children: Anwen Williams
- Home era: Early 21st century

Rhys Alun Williams, portrayed by Kai Owen, is a fictional character in the BBC television programme Torchwood, a spin-off from the long-running series Doctor Who. The character is introduced in the premiere episode as the co-habiting boyfriend of the principal character Gwen Cooper. Initially a recurring character, Rhys' role is increased after the second series; actor Kai Owen is given star billing from the show's third series — a five-part serial subtitled Torchwood: Children of Earth — onwards. The character has gone on to appear in expanded universe material such as the Torchwood novels and audiobooks, comic books and radio plays.

Throughout the first series (2006), Rhys is initially unaware of Gwen's vocation as a Torchwood agent, believing her to work in generic special forces. Gwen's relationship with Rhys languishes while she is unable to communicate fully with him, but in the early part of series two (2008) he discovers the truth, and from then on in their relationship is revitalised; the two enter a marriage based on honesty later in the series. In the third series (2009) Rhys becomes directly involved in assisting the Torchwood team in lieu of a fourth team member. In the show's fourth series — a 2011 BBC/Starz co-production — Rhys again finds himself having to assist Torchwood, though he would rather live a domestic life with Gwen and their daughter Anwen.

The original intention of the writers had been to kill off Rhys at the end of the first series, but series creator Russell T Davies found it necessary to keep the show grounded through Rhys as Gwen evolved as a character. Producer Richard Stokes stated that "without him, it simply becomes a sci-fi show about sci-fi people, running around and hunting aliens." Following from the first series the production team decided to make Rhys less of a "sap" whilst continuing to use him as a contrast to Torchwood's activities and its charismatic leader Jack Harkness. Whilst early response to the character was mixed — the character was parodied as "Barry Backstory" — subsequent reviews praised the character's larger role in later episodes.

== Appearances ==
=== Television ===
Rhys is introduced in the first episode of the series (2006) as the unspectacular boyfriend of police constable Gwen Cooper (Eve Myles). When Gwen takes a new job with the Torchwood Institute's Cardiff branch as an alien hunter, she is forced to keep it a secret. Over the course of the first series Rhys shows increasing irritation with Gwen's evasiveness and long hours, and her ease and readiness to lie to him. Unknown to Rhys, Gwen establishes a sexual relationship with Owen Harper (Burn Gorman) to help herself deal with her secret double-life. She confesses the affair after it ends in "Combat" but drugs Rhys with an amnesia pill so he will not remember her confession. Rhys is murdered by Bilis Manger (Murray Melvin) in "End of Days", but this event is erased from history after the Torchwood team reset time by opening the space-time rift located in Cardiff.

The series two premiere (2008) establishes that Rhys became engaged to Gwen between the first and second series. After Rhys becomes suspicious of her behaviour and her friendship with her boss Captain Jack (John Barrowman) in "Meat", Gwen reveals to him the truth about her responsibilities with Torchwood. Rhys then becomes involved in a mission to uncover and destroy an alien meat-trading racket, and ends up taking a bullet to protect Gwen's life. Because she enjoys finally being able to be honest with Rhys, Gwen cannot bring herself to drug him for a second time, and so demands that Jack allow Rhys keep his memories of Torchwood. Rhys and Gwen marry in the episode "Something Borrowed". Following the wedding, in the episode "Adrift", Rhys brings up the issue of starting a family with Gwen, though she dismisses the idea, arguing that it would be impossible to have children with her job. During the events of "Fragments" and series finale "Exit Wounds", Rhys plays a particular role in the team's campaign against the returned Captain John Hart (James Marsters) and the insane Gray (Lachlan Nieboer), helping Gwen rescue the others after they are caught in an exploding building and subsequently working with Gwen's former colleague Andy Davidson (Tom Price) to help keep the attacking alien Weevils out of the police station.

Rhys is referenced, but does not appear onscreen, in the Doctor Who crossover episode "The Stolen Earth" (2008); Gwen speaks to him over the phone during a global emergency. Rhys becomes a main character in the third series of Torchwood, a five-part miniseries called Children of Earth airing in 2009. When aliens called the 456 announce their plans to visit to Earth, the government attempts to assassinate Torchwood to cover up a conspiracy. Rhys becomes a fugitive from the government because of his marriage to Gwen. The pair flee to London via cargo lorry and Rhys is delighted to discover Gwen is pregnant. He is with the Torchwood team when they relocate to a London warehouse and takes a role in their mission, hiding with the recordings showing corruption within Downing Street. In the last episode of the series he returns to Cardiff with Gwen, and helps Gwen do one last favour for her deceased coworker Ianto (Gareth David-Lloyd) by helping his niece and nephew evade capture, and with them many other neighbourhood children. The series' dénouement, set six months later, shows Rhys still at Gwen's side, awaiting the arrival of their child.

Series four, Miracle Day (2011), begins by showing Rhys living in seclusion alongside Gwen and their daughter, Anwen. His rural idyll is shattered when CIA agent Rex Matheson (Mekhi Phifer) extradites Jack and Gwen to America—believing them to be connected to a phenomenon where humans can no longer die—whilst forcing Rhys to stay in Wales. With the aid of computer expert Esther Drummond (Alexa Havins), Gwen is able to establish communications with Rhys in the episode "Dead of Night". Whilst on a mission in Los Angeles, Gwen asks Rhys to remove her father Geraint (William Thomas) from a hospital which she believes to be unsafe. Rhys subsequently has Geraint sent to an "overflow camp", unaware that it contains a facility for burning the severely injured alive, and in "The Categories of Life" and "The Middle Men" has to go undercover to help rescue his father-in-law. After escaping from the facility with Geraint, Rhys is briefly held hostage in an attempt to force Gwen to surrender Jack Harkness, but is rescued by Andy and his team. In "The Gathering", Rhys figures out the antipodal connection between Buenos Aires and Shanghai, which directs the Torchwood team to their final mission. Because of Rhys' violent disposition towards murderer-paedophile Oswald Danes (Bill Pullman), Gwen fears that he may enact vigilante justice and so takes the latter to Shanghai to protect her husband. In the series finale, Rhys gains entry to the overflow camp where Geraint has been recaptured in order to sit by his side as "Miracle Day" ends and death is restored. After Esther's funeral, he is hopeful that Jack will not reform Torchwood.

=== Literature ===
He wasn't even sure he could survive without Gwen in his life. She had intertwined herself into his very existence to the point where the thought of being single again was like the thought of losing an arm, or an eye.

— Excerpt from Slow Decay by Andy Lane (p.89),
Torchwood literature explores Rhys' feelings, prior to his increased role in the series.

Rhys appears in all three Torchwood novels in the first wave published by BBC Books in January 2007, set between episodes of Torchwood series one. These novels expand on the difficult period in Gwen and Rhys' relationship — whilst his appearances in Another Life, and Border Princes, are relatively minor, he has a more significant role in Slow Decay, where he unwittingly brings himself into danger by taking an alien diet pill. Reviewer Patrick Holm feels that the success of these novels lies in the fact that they help readers empathise with characters such as Rhys. Rhys makes cameo appearances in Something in the Water (set between "Kiss Kiss Bang Bang" and "Meat") and Trace Memory, and has a significant role in The Twilight Streets, (released March 2008) which depicts an alternate future where Gwen and Rhys start a new Torchwood to make a safe world for their son after the Torchwood Team are destroyed fighting sentient particles known as the dark. Three more Torchwood books were released in October 2008 in which Rhys has an involved role. In Pack Animals Rhys assists Gwen in her investigation and becomes part of a car chase, SkyPoint sees them inadvertently discover an alien presence whilst flathunting and Almost Perfect, the first novel set after "Exit Wounds", depicts Rhys speed dating undercover. Rhys makes further appearances in later Torchwood novels Bay of the Dead, The House that Jack Built, and Consequences, all set between "Exit Wounds" and Children of Earth.

Rhys appeared occasionally in the Torchwood Magazine comic strip during its publication between January 2008 and December 2010. In part three of the serialised ten-part comic Rift War he aids Gwen in her Torchwood duties by helping care for an infant alien left stranded in Cardiff. A scene in Gareth David-Lloyd's comic "Shrouded", published in May 2010, includes a scene set after Children in Earth which shows Gwen cradling her young child; as Gwen is busy, Rhys is required to team up with Captain John Hart to save the timeline. Non-fiction tie-in The Torchwood Archives gives an "insider's look" into the Torchwood world, including Gwen's domestic life with Rhys. The book includes unpublished photographs of Gwen and Rhys used as set dressing in the TV series and also provides some background information on Rhys' friends and his working life.

=== Audio drama ===
Rhys makes an appearance in the Torchwood radio play "The Dead Line" (2009), where he assists Gwen with her investigations into the phone-line induced comas. He also has a central role investigating a mystery in the audio book Ghost Train (2011), read by Kai Owen. With Gwen dead and Jack missing Rhys is left alone to figure out the strange goings on involving cargo trains. Rhys also appears in "The Devil and Miss Carew" (2011), one of three additional radio plays set between "Exit Wounds" and Children of Earth, which shows his reaction to the death of his elderly Uncle Bryn. In this play Rhys rescues Gwen from a woman under the influence of a malevolent devil like entity.

== Characterisation ==
[Russell T Davies] realised that, if we lost Rhys, we would lose Gwen's heart. He is one of the key things that makes her character so fantastic, and by extension the entire show. With Rhys there, it's a show about real people dealing with extraordinary situations in the real world. Without him, it simply becomes a sci-fi show about sci-fi people, running around and hunting aliens.

— Producer Richard Stokes on the decision not to kill off the character.

Rhys is a "down to earth trucker", who functions as Gwen Cooper's normality base. At the start of the series he believes alien interference to be a result of hallucinations induced by psychotropic drugs in the water supply and that his girlfriend's job is nothing more unusual than generic "special ops". Writer Stephen James Walker feels that Rhys "originally didn't look to have much to him initially but really came into his own as Series One progressed", attributing this to the "spot-on performance of the perfectly cast Kai Owen." The original intention of the writers had been for Rhys to die at the end of series one, but Richard Stokes explains that it was overruled by show creator Russell T Davies, who felt that without Rhys, the show's main link to the real world would be lost. Executive Producer Julie Gardner expands on this by stating that "It's a show where you've got to contrast the ordinary everyday with the extraordinary and (with) Gwen going home to Rhys and then going to work in an underground secret base ... it's right to have that balance." Actor Kai Owen attributes part of his character's success to his on-screen rapport with actress Eve Myles.

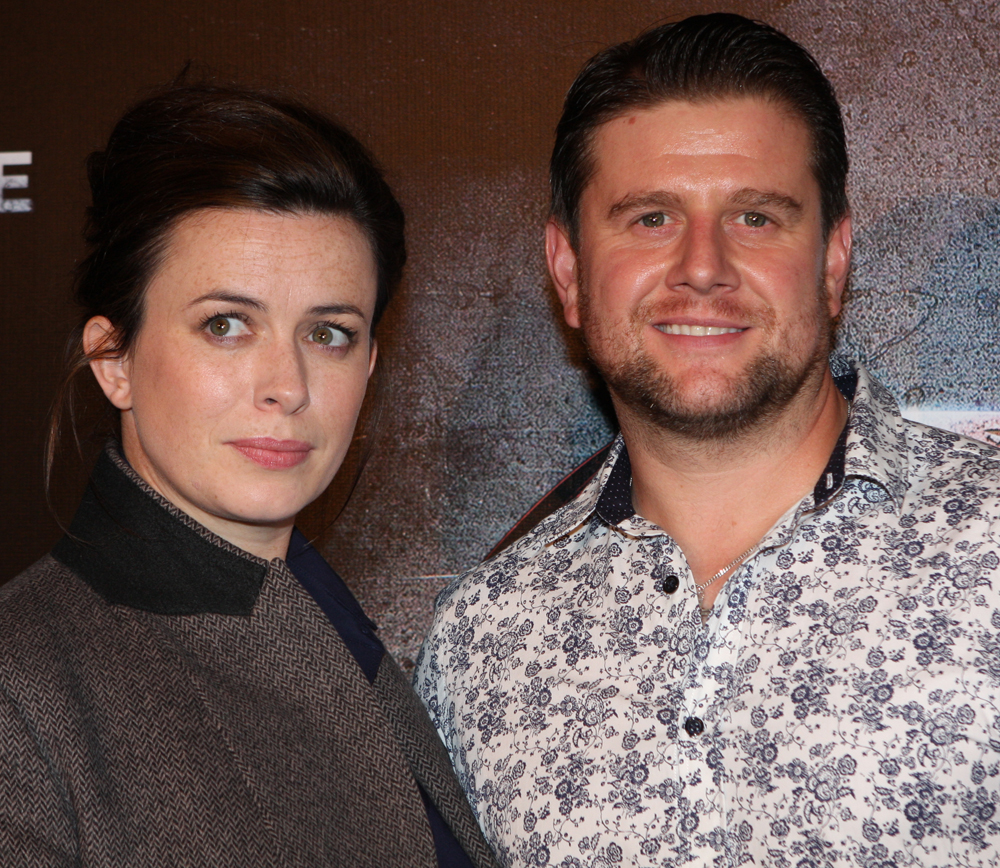
Kai Owen pictured with on-screen wife Eve Myles in 2013. In a 2009 interview Owen spoke positively of the effect his rapport with Myles had on his character's development.

After reprisal from death, Davies felt further development was necessary for the character to continue as part of the drama; one of the first decisions the production team made was that "we can't make this guy look like a sap any longer. He's got to be made aware of what's going on." The events of the episode "Meat", in which Rhys learns the real nature of Gwen's job, are seen by Davies as a "rite of passage" for the couple. Director Colin Teague highlights Rhys' patience in relation to Gwen noting that "he puts up with an awful lot from his wife to be". The second series also explores Rhys's insecurities and jealousies towards series protagonist Captain Jack Harkness, for whom a mutual sexual tension with Gwen was evident in the first series. Both Stephen James Walker and episode writer Catherine Tregenna felt that "the triangle of relationships between Rhys, Gwen and Jack" comprise "the most interesting narrative territory explored in 'Meat'". Although actor Kai Owen feels that "Rhys will always have a little bit of a gripe about Jack", he concedes that "he respects him and he'll like him for looking after Gwen". Walker comments favourably on the interaction between Jack and Rhys in "Meat" in both its antagonistic and comedic forms, citing the scene in the truck where Rhys questions Jack as particularly effective. The two function as unusual literary foils for one another, insofar as their relationships with Gwen are concerned. In her critical essay Gwen's Evil Stepmother: Concerning Gloves and Magic Slippers, Valerie Estelle Frankel compares Rhys to Jack, likening the former to a "sweet, kind handsome prince" and the latter to a "compelling trickster." Whilst Eve Myles feels that "Jack highlights how ordinary Rhys is", she states that it is precisely this ordinariness which makes Rhys a benefit to Gwen's strength of character.

The plot of Children of Earth results in Rhys becoming more directly involved with the Torchwood team's activities, and actor Kai Owen also receives star billing for the first time. Whilst Gwen by the third series has become a more militant character, Rhys retains his everyman status and takes on the role of audience surrogate; press material describes him as "the ordinary guy in the street" and "the normal person's eyes and ears" who "says what he thinks about the situations Torchwood find themselves in, bringing the reality back to them". Paul Collins comments of the significance of Rhys having the first dialogue in the serial, remarking that this is Torchwood's "determination to establish its domestic credentials before subverting them". Rhys becomes a reluctant hero; Kai Owen states that he "would rather not get involved if he had the choice", but when faced with the life-or-death situations in the serial "he doesn't run away from it" because the character has "seen so many things". This, in Owen's eyes, makes the Rhys seen in Children of Earth a "very brave hero who has grown in stature". Rhys retains core character status for the fourth series, Torchwood: Miracle Day. Whilst Kai Owen explains that Rhys will always be at the forefront of "Gwen's troubles or fights or adventures" because of his concern for her, he remains unafraid to tell her when she has become too consumed by her job. Davies links the relationship between Gwen and Rhys in the fourth series to the show's continued exploration of human sexuality, stating that "open sexuality has to include everything" including "a husband/wife great big crime-fighting team ... happily in love".

== Reception ==
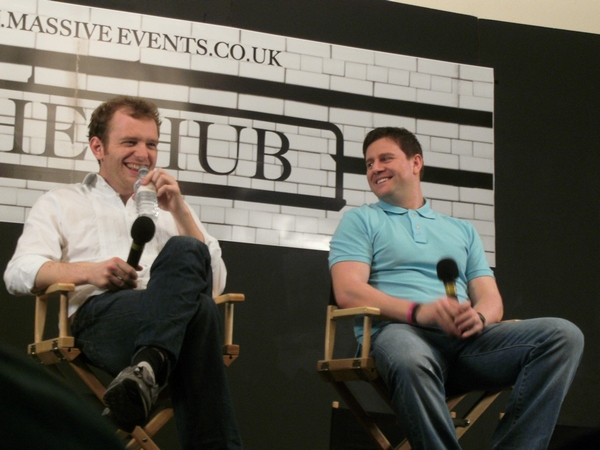
The on-screen rapport between Kai Owen and Tom Price has been praised by reviewers as a particular example of the character providing comic relief.

Rhys' incidental role in the series was initially mocked in The Register's 2006 one-off Torchwood parody Under Torch Wood (in the style of Dylan Thomas' Under Milk Wood), in which he is described as "Barry Backstory, who is dreaming of future episodes where he gets a bigger part." However, as the character has been developed on screen and given a bigger role, he has attracted more positive commentary from reviewers. Ben Rawson-Jones of Digital Spy describes his role in the episode "Meat" as "forming a clever contrast with the activities of Torchwood". He praised the verisimilitude of Rhys' relationship with Gwen, describing their domestic argument as "a unique spin on the kitchen sink melodrama usually seen in EastEnders" which delivers "a real impact and emotional honesty due to the wonderfully earnest performances from Kai Owen and Eve Myles". Jack Kibble-White of Den of Geek states that "in the main having Rhys run alongside Captain Jack and the rest worked well" and he cites the character's wedding to Gwen as a series highlight. TV Squad's Jason Hughes feels that the character's marriage to Gwen is "handled in a painfully honest way" and serves as "a true definition of "love" written with subtlety and perfection". Alan Stanley Blair enjoyed the rapport between Owen and Price (PC Andy) in the episode "Exit Wounds" stating, that it "was also an interesting dynamic" and that the two "could potentially carry their own sitcom", a view corroborated by AfterElton's Steven Frank.

Dan Martin of The Guardian singles out the scene where Gwen and Rhys become stowaways in Children of Earth as "just lovely" and "a credit to both actors, particularly Kai Owen, who has finally made Rhys likable", whilst IGN writer Asham Haque also feels that Rhys' "meatier role" provides "some great sequences" for the couple. Rawson-Jones speaks favourably on Owen's role in the overall ensemble opining that he, along with Barrowman, Myles and David-Lloyd managed to guide the audience through the serial with "panache and verve". The Chicago Tribune's Maureen Ryan feels that the initiated Rhys is key to the show, and is a "very enjoyable character", describing his appeal to government PA Lois Habiba to pay for his and Gwen's dinner as "priceless". Speaking of the show's fourth series premiere, Simon Brew highlights the central returning trio of Barrowman, Myles and Owen as the show's most engaging actors, and further describes Owen's performance as mixing "humour with an earnest, and a real sense of drive".
