= Andy Davidson (Torchwood) =

- Torchwood character
- First appearance: "Everything Changes"
- Last appearance: "The Blood Line"
- Portrayed by: Tom Price

In-universe information
- Affiliation: South Wales Police; Gwen Cooper
- Home era: 21st century

Andy Davidson is a fictional character in the BBC television programme Torchwood, portrayed by Tom Price, a spin-off from the long-running series Doctor Who. Andy, an officer with the South Wales Police, is a supporting character who first appears in Torchwood's premiere episode "Everything Changes" and recurs regularly from thereon. Though initially only credited as 'PC Andy', the character's surname 'Davidson' was given in novels and online media and eventually confirmed by dialogue in Children of Earth, "Day Three" (2009). Like Gwen's partner, Rhys (Kai Owen), Andy is used by the production team as an everyman character who grounds the series in a recognisable real-world setting. The character had originally been slated to be killed off in the first series, though the production team had a change of heart, believing him to work well as a supporting character. Both cast and crew, as well as professional reviewers have spoken of the character's role in providing comic relief and an outsider's perspective on the Torchwood Institute.

Within the series' narrative, Andy is introduced as a constable for the South Wales Police in Cardiff, as the beat partner of leading female character Gwen. Whilst Andy's role in the first series is peripheral, he has a larger role in the second series where he assists Gwen more directly in her ongoing cases. Whilst jealous of Gwen's exciting life with Torchwood, he remains loyal to her, choosing her side rather than follow government procedure in Children of Earth. By the time of the fourth series, Miracle Day (2011), set two years after the previous serial, Andy has been promoted to the rank of sergeant and acts as a UK-based ally to the now-transatlantic Torchwood team. External commentary on the series has referred to him as a "fan favourite".

== Appearances ==
=== Television ===
Andy first appears in the series première "Everything Changes" (2006) and is present when his police partner Gwen Cooper sustains a head injury, causing him to remain sceptical when she begins tracking Captain Jack Harkness (John Barrowman) and Torchwood. After Gwen joins Torchwood, she meets Davidson again outside a nightclub where a man has been killed by a "sex monster"-possessed woman. Like Gwen's boyfriend Rhys (Kai Owen), Andy initially believes that she has been promoted to "special ops". He later appears to begrudgingly assist Gwen in series one finale "End of Days" (2007), and the second series opener "Kiss Kiss, Bang Bang" (2008). In "Adrift", Davidson calls Gwen to investigate sudden disappearances in Cardiff, and admonishes her for her hardened perspective. During the episode he reveals his affection for her and resentment toward Rhys, which Gwen learns is his excuse for not attending her wedding. During "Exit Wounds", Andy helps Gwen in coordinating the police force's response to the bombs planted by Gray (Lachlan Nieober) and Captain John Hart (James Marsters), subsequently working alongside Rhys to keep the attacking alien Weevils out of the police station.

In Children of Earth (2009), he is present after the Torchwood Hub is blown up. He is ordered by Agent Johnson (Liz May Brice) to lead a team of government hit men to Gwen and Rhys' house. However, Davidson does not believe that Gwen is really a terrorist and subsequently delays Johnson, giving Gwen time to escape. Two days later he assists Gwen in securing the paperwork to bail Clem McDonald (Paul Copley) from police custody. After the death of Ianto (Gareth David Lloyd), Gwen's Torchwood colleague, Andy drives Gwen and Rhys to the council estate where Ianto's sister Rhiannon (Katy Wix) lives with her family. He struggles with his duty as he watches the police and the army forcefully seizing children in order to appease the 456 and ultimately discards his uniform to fight alongside rioting civilians against the authorities. In "The New World" (2011) Andy, now a police sergeant, gets in touch with Gwen and Rhys who are in hiding, and informs them that Gwen's father Geraint (William Thomas) is in hospital following two heart attacks and should have died, but has not. Andy explains that this is due to Miracle Day, a phenomenon whereby death ceases to occur across the world and the gravely-wounded continue to remain alive. Along with other South Wales police officers he assists with CIA agent Rex Matheson's (Mekhi Phifer) extradition of Jack and Gwen to the United States. After the Torchwood team have relocated to Washington Jack learns that Andy has had Rhys and daughter Anwen moved to a safe house. In "The Categories of Life", he attempts to use his sergeant status to extract Gwen's father from an "overflow camp", later regarded as a form of concentration camp, but is unsuccessful. In "Immortal Sins" Andy is called upon by Esther Drummond (Alexa Havins) to rescue Gwen's family from a hostage situation, shooting one of the captors in the process. He is visibly shaken at his actions, stating that he'd never shot anyone before. In "The Blood Line" Andy accompanies Rhys to the overflow camp to sit with his dying father-in-law and himself comforts a dying teenage girl with no known family as she dies.

=== Spin-off media ===
In addition to the televised series, Andy makes appearances in Torchwood novels and audio dramas. He encounters Gwen again in the novel Another Life (set during series one) at the scene of Guy Wildman's death, and shows frustration at her evasive replies to his inquiries. In the novel Slow Decay, Rhys phones Andy after the attempted abduction of colleague Lucy Sobel and detects from Andy's handling of the situation that Andy does not seem to like him, foreshadowing his later characterisation in the second series. The novel Trace Memory depicts a flashback of Gwen Cooper's first day partnered alongside him in the police force. Non-fiction tie-in The Torchwood Archives claims that Andy and Gwen were partners in the force for four years, prior to the events of "Everything Changes" and that during that time Andy never made a single criticism of her. Andy also appears in the Torchwood audiobook In the Shadows, where he alerts Gwen to a mysterious case. Price provides voice acting for the Torchwood radio play "Asylum" in which Andy takes a personal interest in Freda, an Asylum seeker from the future. Andy has a central role in the 2012 audiobook Fallout, read by Tom Price and set after the conclusion of Miracle Day, where he must investigate alien technology in the absence of Gwen and Torchwood. A reviewer for the Ely Standard notes that the character's role has "gradually expanded to the point whereby he can comfortably hold his own as lead character". Andy subsequently plays a large role in the audiobook Mr Invincible, also narrated by Price, where he joins forces with Captain Jack to investigate a number of time-related discrepancies in the Cardiff area.

He has a much more substantial role in the audio dramas created by Big Finish Productions, starting in Ghost Mission, where in he meets Norton Folgate, a character he would go on to have more adventures with. In the BF-produced fifth (Aliens Among Us) and sixth series (God Among Us), Andy becomes a more frequent collaborator with Torchwood, starting a relationship with Yvonne Hartman in the process. In 2020, Price reprised the role of Andy for a role in Stranded – a Big Finish audio spin-off of Torchwood's parent series, Doctor Who – in which Andy has been sent to London at the behest of Torchwood to observe the Eighth Doctor after he finds himself stuck on Earth with a faulty TARDIS. From volume two onwards, Andy begins travelling in the TARDIS as it gradually repairs itself.

== Characterisation ==
Bet you ten quid they're DNA specialists. It's all DNA these days, like that CSI bollocks. CSI Cardiff, I'd like to see that. They'd be measuring the velocity of a kebab.

— Andy in "Everything Changes" by Russell T Davies

Though the casting call had specified Welsh actors only, the role of Andy was cast to Tom Price, who does not originate from Wales. Price characterises Andy as the sort of police officer who doesn't see much action, typically being more occupied with paperwork. Andy is shown to be sceptical towards the increasing role of forensics in policing, and his style is seen to favour a traditional investigative approach. An earnest individual, Andy's concern remains human and his appearance in "Adrift" is used to highlight Gwen's development into a harder woman since joining Torchwood.

In an interview with Doctor Who Magazine, actor Tom Price states that one of the original producers had originally wanted to kill Andy off in the first series as he was such a peripheral character. Executive producer Julie Gardner felt that it suited to have Andy return later in the series as it maintains a sense of continuity. She believes that there's a palpable relationship between Gwen and Andy. Director Brian Kelly opines that it makes perfect sense for Andy to return in episode thirteen as "he is the person who would phone Gwen" in a crisis situation. Eve Myles, who portrays Gwen, believes that Price conveys the humorous aspects of Andy's character "fantastically", which enables her as an actress to understand the friendship between the characters. Myles also feels that Andy plays a crucial part in reminding viewers of Gwen's development; when he reappears "it takes you right back to the beginning, it reminds you where she came from, how Jack found Gwen". Price enumerates that by the second series Andy is used by the production team as a "pressure valve" to relieve tension.

2008 episode "Adrift" reveals that Andy has harboured feelings for Gwen over the course of several years, a revelation which Stephen James Walker feels helps add extra depth to the character. Price, speaking about his character's history, speculates that Andy may once have made a clumsy pass at Gwen when the two of them were first partnered up. Though he does not fully understand the purpose of their work, Andy generally trusts Torchwood because of Gwen's involvement. In Children of Earth, Andy even goes against government orders and at one point takes off his police uniform to aid Gwen. Eve Myles feels that Andy "gets his recognition" through his actions in the five part serial. Price was phoned by Gardner with details of his character's proposed in universe promotion to sergeant a year before it was confirmed that a fourth series would go ahead.

== Reception ==
The Guardian's "Organ Grinder" reviewer attributes some of the most memorable lines of the premiere episode to those spoken by Andy, whilst Ben Rawson-Jones praises the external perspective which Andy brings to the Torchwood Institute's operations. Writer Stephen James Walker opines that Andy maintains the shows link to reality equally as well as Gwen's partner Rhys, describing Price as "a thoroughly likeable and engaging performer with a great lightness of touch, and someone that the viewer is very happy to see more of". For Walker, Andy's "naive hope" of a position in Torchwood makes him particularly endearing. After the broadcast of the episode "Exit Wounds", both Airlock Alpha's Alan Stanley Blair and AfterElton's Steven Frank commented favourably on the humorous Rhys/Andy dynamic, each stating that the two could carry their own spin-off. In a review of Children of Earth, Blair subsequently describes Andy as "a light hearted joy in such dark times", whilst Comic Book Resources reviewer Remy Minnick singles Price out as the surprise performance from the cast, describing his scenes in the final episode as ones "that will bring tears to some eyes".

Andy's appearances in the series have led to him being described as a "fan favourite" by TV Squad's Catherine Lawson. This description of the character was picked up in Heather Hogan's parody recaps of the fourth series in which she has the characters of Andy, Gwen and Rhys draw attention to Andy's fan favourite status in regards to his ongoing characterisation. Morgan Jeffrey, in his recaps for Digital Spy, expressed delight at the reappearance of Andy, whom he later terms the "loveable sergeant". Jeffrey felt the character to be "heroic" in "Immortal Sins" and states that his leading the armed response rescue of Gwen's family was the best thing about the episodes denouement. Blair Marnell, reviewing for CraveOnline felt that Andy's betrayal of Gwen in the premiere episode did not have the impact it should have had due to the character's minimal role. However, Marnell felt that Andy's comforting of the young dying girl in the episode's conclusion provided "the most human moment" of the finalé and that this served as "a huge indictment against the rest of the characters".
