= Vera Juarez =

Dr Vera Juarez
- Torchwood character
- First appearance: "The New World"
- Last appearance: "The Categories of Life"
- Portrayed by: Arlene Tur

In-universe information
- Affiliation: US Government; Torchwood Institute
- Home era: Early 21st century

Dr Vera Juarez is a fictional character in the BBC television programme Torchwood, a spin-off from the long-running series Doctor Who, portrayed by Cuban American actress Arlene Tur. The character was promoted as one of five new main characters to join Torchwood in its fourth series, Torchwood: Miracle Day (2011), as part of a new co-production between Torchwood's British network, BBC One, and its American financiers on US premium television network Starz. Tur appears in the first five of the overall ten episodes, and is credited as a 'special guest star'.

The narrative of Miracle Day depicts the effects of an event which halts the process of death worldwide meaning the gravely-wounded continue to remain alive. As an attending surgeon, Vera is amongst the first to realise the significance of events and the associated repercussions. Her morals and professionalism pit her at odds with the increasingly inept medical system and shifting government legislation. After establishing a sexual relationship with Rex Matheson she allies herself with his Torchwood team. However, her first undercover investigation for the group is her last; she is burned alive after dissenting against one of the middle-men in charge of a government run concentration camp.

In early episodes, the character provides a reference point for viewers in regards to the effects of people who should be dead not dying. To prepare for the role, Tur spent time in a hospital emergency department and shadowed a professional medical doctor. Some critics felt that the character's hands on role enabled the audience to relate more to the crisis; others maintained that she wasn't given enough time to develop. Response to the character's violent death was mixed; some praised the increasingly dark shift whilst others felt it was too evocative of the Holocaust for a TV drama. The writers intent in scripting her demise had been to remind audiences that intense human cruelty is possible in human society.

== Appearances ==
Vera first appears in "The New World" when she is called upon to treat Rex Matheson (Mekhi Phifer), who has been impaled through the chest by a metal pole. Vera conveys news that Rex has survived to his colleague Esther (Alexa Havins) along with the news that no one has died in the past 24 hours, which she corroborates with accounts from other hospitals. In "Rendition" Vera realises that the hospitals cannot cope and suggests overriding the orthodox triage system so that in the wake of "Miracle Day" those with less severe illnesses are treated first. She later joins a series of medical panels; she engages the help of one to provide Rex with instructions to concoct emergency EDTA which when used as a chelating agent saves the life of a poisoned and now mortal Jack (John Barrowman). "Dead of Night" marks the beginning of a sexual relationship between Rex and Vera; he later enlists her to aid Torchwood's infiltration of a Phicorp conference. Unlike onlookers, she is disgusted by the battle for popularity between Oswald Danes and a rival spokesperson which occurs on the grounds of her hospital. In "The Categories of Life", when the Washington medical panels are abandoned in the wake of a new system of categorising life Vera allies herself with the Torchwood group, now based in Los Angeles. She goes undercover as an inspector of the San Pedro overflow camp against Rex's wishes. Appalled at the inhumane conditions and low management standards she tells camp manager Colin Maloney (Marc Vann) she wants him prosecuted. Maloney shoots Juarez twice and takes her to a 'module' within the camp. This is revealed to be a giant oven used to burn surplus but still alive people; Vera is incinerated whilst a horrified Rex watches on.

== Concept and development ==
Arlene Tur was the first member of the new cast for the series to be announced, in November 2010. The character was later described in a press release as being "smart, fast talking and hard working" in addition to "sexy, confident and passionate". To prepare for the role of a surgeon Tur had to familiarise herself with medical terminology, whilst the production team aided in getting her into an emergency department and provided her with the opportunity to shadow a doctor. Vera is introduced in the middle of what to her is "a pretty normal day" before 'Miracle Day' escalates. As Tur explains in the pre-series press pack her character is pre-occupied with fighting "to learn how we deal with the situation" as well as for her own sanity: her own medical training "no longer holds true". It is her surgical and ER experience which leads to her advising on government think-tanks set up to evaluate the crisis.

A relationship between Rex and Vera was noted in a press-release, which stated that the two characters' lives become "inextricably tangled up" due to 'Miracle Day'. Vera's initial relationship to Rex is as his liaison to keep him pain free following his near death accident. Tur explained that when Rex confides in Vera in a later episode both characters' vulnerabilities are exposed and that this forms the basis of a relationship between the two. Series writer Jane Espenson – who wrote "Dead of Night" in which the characters begin a sexual relationship – felt that they were "two exhausted people who fall together because of something almost as elemental as gravity." Arlene Tur elaborated on this stating that in times of crisis people look for "emotions to be satisfied because there’s so much fear and uncertainty." Mekhi Phifer noted that the relationship is entirely circumstantial, pointing out Rex wouldn't have had a chance to form a relationship with Vera without 'Miracle Day'. Tur noted that "there's not too much foundation that this relationship is built on" yet "there is something there that has flourished despite all the chaos."

Vera's time on the government medical panels ended with her making a "moral choice of enormous consequence." In her retrospective of the self-penned "The Categories of Life" Espenson observed that the introductory scene establishes Vera as the main focus of the episode and that her arc carries the story between the beginning and end of the episode. As Espenson noted, Vera's character journey transforms her from a doctor who contributed to healthcare discussion to "a crusader against this redefinition of life and death." io9 correspondent Charlie Jane Anders commented that the script exposes the character's "human vanity" in a way characteristic of Espenson by showing her "too proud to hide her feelings". Espenson felt that the death scene – in which Vera is burned alive in what is identified as a concentration camp – is both a "horrible and painful death on its own terms" but also meant to evoke "the greatest horror of modern mankind."

== Reception ==
Alex Zalben of MTV.com opined of the new characters introduced in the first three episodes of the fourth series that Vera "probably comes off as best", noting that she has the most do. Dave Golder from SFX praised sequences in the series' early episodes where Vera responds to the ongoing health crisis stating in a review of episode four that she is "the main focus point for the harrowing side effects of Miracle Day" and through her we are given "less theoretical chit chat" and "more actual on-screen evidence." Reviewing Vera's death, Golder stated she was "the best character on the show and now she’s a pile of ash." Whilst remarking that killing off a strong character gave extra effect to the death, he felt that "the rest of the series is going to suffer from her absence." The Guardian's Dan Martin felt that the character's death in "The Categories of Life" marked the series reaching its potential, noting the end of the episode as "a brutally shocking sequence" that formed part of a "lacerating climax." However, Martin felt that the audience were only just starting to like Vera because she hadn't had much of a presence in the series. He referred to her as "setting some sort of record for shortest survival period of a Torchwood team-member." io9's Charlie Jane Anders remarked that Vera's death was a "scene of almost unbearable horror, laced with irony", praising the juxtaposition of Oswald's "ludicrous pronouncement that this is a transformation akin to the leap from animals to humans 50,000 years ago" alongside Vera's fate showing "we're all destined to burn." In his retrospective of the series as a whole, Digital Spy's Morgan Jeffrey praised the portrayal of Vera stating "Arlene Tur was great in the role and her character's violent death gave the next few episodes a terrific jolt."

AfterElton commentator Heather Hogan notes that the sequence of Vera's death "managed to shock most of the audience"; though she was forewarned of the character's death she still watched with her mouth "completely agape." Hogan notes that "one of the most unnerving" things about Vera's death was that "it evokes a vivid memory of the Nazi ovens used in the Holocaust." Writer Jane Espenson received complaints that the series was wrong to reference Nazi's. In response to these criticisms Espenson stated that she believed it would be worse for the writers and audience to "forget that mankind is capable" of such actions. The death of Vera itself prompted a discussion between Hogan and AfterElton editor Michael Jensen; the latter thought the sequence was too dark, even for a series with Torchwood's reputation. Hogan concluded that whilst she felt that the sequence would haunt her, she didn't feel victimized and the sequence enabled her to "know what the stakes are in this game Torchwood is playing."
