= Torchwood: Children of Earth =

2009 Torchwood series

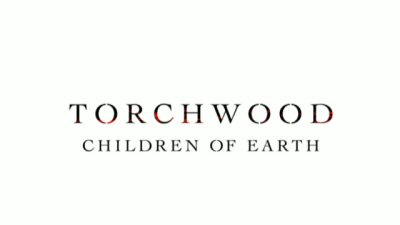
- Showrunner: Russell T Davies
- Starring: John Barrowman; Eve Myles; Gareth David-Lloyd; Kai Owen
- No. of episodes: 5

Release
- Original network: BBC One
- Original release: 6 July – 10 July 2009

Series chronology
- ← Previous; Series 2 Next → Series 4: Miracle Day

Children of Earth is the banner title of the third series of the British science fiction television series Torchwood, broadcast for five episodes on BBC One from 6 to 10 July 2009. Directed by Euros Lyn, who had considerable experience on the revived Doctor Who (of which Torchwood is a spin-off), the series follows an organisation known as Torchwood which defends the Earth against alien threats. Children of Earth's plot involves aliens demanding 10% of the Earth's children, as such, Torchwood is pitted against the British government when it attempts to accede to the present-day aliens' demands and conceal a related conspiracy from 40 years prior. The first, third, and fifth episodes of the serial were written by executive producer Russell T Davies, who also conceived its overall storyline. The third episode was co-written by James Moran whilst the second and fourth were penned by newcomer John Fay.

Children of Earth was shown on BBC One on consecutive weeknights in July 2009. Despite the move from BBC Three, the show was cut from a standard thirteen-episode run to just five, something that lead actor John Barrowman felt was almost like a "punishment" from the BBC. Production on the mini-series began in August 2008, with Barrowman along with actors Eve Myles, Gareth David-Lloyd and Kai Owen all reprising their roles as Jack Harkness, Gwen Cooper, Ianto Jones and Rhys Williams, respectively.

Upon premiere, the series defied expectations by achieving more than six million viewers during mid-summer evenings, a period which is generally considered a graveyard slot for drama. The series also received critical acclaim, particularly in comparison to the programme's previous two series, receiving a BAFTA Cymru Award, a Saturn Award and Celtic Media Festival Award, all for best serial. The success of the series led to a fourth series, Torchwood: Miracle Day, which was commissioned in conjunction with the US premium cable network Starz.

== Episodes ==
List of Torchwood: Children of Earth episodes
| No. overall | No. in series | Title | Directed by | Written by | Original release date | Prod. code | UK viewers (millions) |
|---|---|---|---|---|---|---|---|
| 27 | 1 | "Day One" | Euros Lyn | Russell T Davies | 6 July 2009 | 3.1 | 6.47 |
Over the course of a day, all the children in the world, along with an elderly man named Clement McDonald, are paralysed in place and speak several messages in unison announcing the return of an alien race known as the 456. While investigating the occurrence, Gwen Cooper discovers she is pregnant. Civil servant John Frobisher is tasked by Prime Minister Brian Green to cover up Torchwood's involvement in the events of 1965, and orders a black-ops kill squad to assassinate all Torchwood members. To this end, Agent Johnson plants a bomb in Jack's abdomen, which detonates inside the Torchwood Hub in Cardiff, destroying it.
| 28 | 2 | "Day Two" | Euros Lyn | John Fay | 7 July 2009 | 3.2 | 6.14 |
Gwen and Ianto flee the destruction of the Hub. Gwen goes on the run with her husband Rhys and Jack's regenerating remains are taken by Agent Johnson to a location where his body reforms. Clement escapes and goes on the run himself as the government are building a chamber to the 456's specifications. Gwen, Rhys, and Ianto eventually rescue Jack, after recruiting Frobisher's personal assistant Lois Habiba to their cause.
| 29 | 3 | "Day Three" | Euros Lyn | Russell T Davies & James Moran | 8 July 2009 | 3.3 | 6.40 |
The Torchwood team set up a base in London to surveil the meeting the Government is having with the 456. The ambassador for the 456 arrives in Thames House, occupying the specially-built chamber containing a certain composition of gases. Frobisher and his staff, including Lois, who wears special contact lenses given to her by Torchwood to record what she sees, hold confidential meetings with the 456 to understand why they have returned. The 456 speak through a translation device and demand that 10% of the world's children are handed over to them, or else they will destroy the human race. Clement, who was rescued by Torchwood, recognises Jack as the one who first gave the children to the 456 during their first visit.
| 30 | 4 | "Day Four" | Euros Lyn | John Fay | 9 July 2009 | 3.4 | 6.76 |
1965; in Scotland, the 456 offer the British government a cure to an influenza strain that would have wiped out 25 million people, in exchange for 12 children. One of these children, Clement McDonald, is not taken because he is pubescent and no longer produces a chemical the 456 use recreationally. Clement escapes and is institutionalised for over 40 years. In the present day, Green and those in the meeting comply with the 456's demands, eventually deciding on those from schools at the bottom of the league tables, as Lois records the British government's agreement. Torchwood threaten to have Rhys leak the government's agreement to the world. Jack and Ianto storm Thames House, confront the 456 and warn them humanity will fight back. In response, the 456 release a lethal virus. Thames House automatically locks down, and Ianto is killed along with many others. At the same time, the 456 kill Clement with an auditory signal.
| 31 | 5 | "Day Five" | Euros Lyn | Russell T Davies | 10 July 2009 | 3.5 | 6.58 |
In order to convince the public to hand over their children, a cover story is invented: an inoculation programme against the paralysing effect. Green orders Frobisher to submit his own children. Frobisher agrees, but returns home and kills his entire family and himself to spare them this fate. When some parents keep their children home from school, the military tries to secure the remaining children by force. Jack uses the same audio signal that was used to kill Clement against the 456, but he is forced to use his own grandson, Steven Carter, as a transmitter; this proves fatal. The ambassador for the 456 writhes and explodes, before they all withdraw from the Earth. Steven's mother Alice refuses to acknowledge her father ever again, their relationship irrevocably destroyed. Green suggests that they cover up the tragedy and place the blame on the United States, but Bridget Spears, Lois's superior, reveals that she has recorded this conversation on the contact lenses and will release it, ending Green's political career. After six months of travelling Earth, a guilty Jack decides to leave for space to start a new life, saying goodbye to a pregnant Gwen and Rhys.

== Production ==
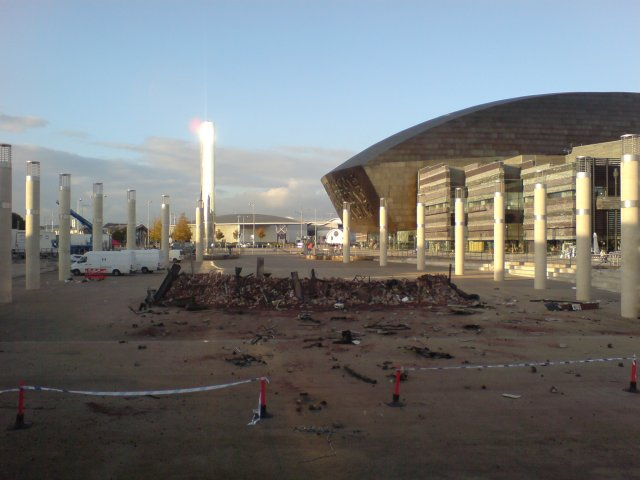
A pyrotechnics-laden barricade on Roald Dahl Plass, cordoned off before filming.

=== Locations ===
Filming for the series started in Cardiff in August 2008, with a week's filming taking place in London. Additional filming took place in the Maindee area of Newport for the pub scene, and on the set of BBC's Casualty in Bristol, which doubled as the fictional St. Helen's Hospital in Cardiff. The set for Floor 13 was the largest ever built at Upper Boat Studios. However, many of the scenes set in the corridors of the same building, doubling for Thames House in London, were shot in the corridors of the Guildhall, Swansea.

=== Casting ===
John Barrowman, Eve Myles, Gareth David Lloyd, Kai Owen and Tom Price all reprise their respective Torchwood roles for the serial. David-Lloyd had first concluded that Ianto was being killed off when his agent told him he was only needed for four out of five episodes.

Peter Capaldi and Nick Briggs had both previously been involved in Doctor Who productions prior to Children of Earth. Capaldi, who portrays Home Office Permanent Secretary John Frobisher, previously played Lobus Caecilius in the Doctor Who episode "The Fires of Pompeii", and would return to Doctor Who in 2013 to play the Twelfth Doctor. Briggs, the voice actor who provides voices for several creatures in the revived series of Doctor Who, including the Daleks, appears as Rick Yates, a member of Brian Green's Cabinet. He had also previously played many roles in the Big Finish range of officially licensed audio dramas.

Having been set up to do so by the conclusion of their storylines in "Journey's End", Doctor Who alumni Freema Agyeman and Noel Clarke were due to reprise their roles as Martha Jones and Mickey Smith respectively, but were unable to participate due to "scheduling issues". Davies explained that Agyeman was cast in Law & Order: UK before Children of Earth had been officially commissioned. Because Law & Order offered her thirteen episodes a year, she went with that over Torchwood which had been reduced to five. In response, Davies introduced the character of Lois Habiba, played by Cush Jumbo, to be a "kind of a Martha figure", one with added innocence who is out of her depth. Agyeman didn't rule out returning to the show at a later date, however, and Davies also expressed interest in her returning to the role. Jack and Gwen explain Martha's absence by saying that she is on her honeymoon, and the Doctor Who serial "The End of Time" reveals that she married Mickey rather than her previous fiancé Thomas Milligan (Tom Ellis).

Children of Earth featured a largely new supporting cast for the duration of the five-episode serial. Further new characters included Clem McDonald (Paul Copley), senior Home Office official Bridget Spears (Susan Brown), Prime Minister Brian Green (Nicholas Farrell), and ruthless operative Agent Johnson (Liz May Brice). Katy Wix and Rhodri Lewis play Rhiannon and Johnny Davies, Ianto's sister and brother-in-law respectively. Lucy Cohu plays Captain Jack Harkness's daughter Alice. The voice of the 456 was provided by actor and voiceover artist Simon Poland.

=== Preview ===
A preview of Children of Earth was screened at the National Film Theatre on 12 June 2009.

== Broadcast ==
Children of Earth was first broadcast on BBC One over five nights from 6 to 10 July 2009. It was the programme's first transmission on BBC One, after its first series debuted on BBC Three in 2006 and its second series moved to BBC Two in 2008.

Internationally, it was broadcast in Australia from 7 July 2009 on UKTV Australia, and was shown from 20 July 2009 on Space in Canada and BBC America in the U.S. (the air date was set to coincide with the launch of BBC America's HD simulcast).

=== Soundtrack ===
Torchwood: Children of Earth

Soundtrack album by Ben Foster and the BBC National Orchestra of Wales
- Released: 7 July 2009
- Recorded: 2008–2009
- Genre: Soundtrack
- Length: 78:35
- Label: Silva Screen Records
- Producer: Ben Foster

Torchwood soundtrack chronology
| Torchwood: Original Television Soundtrack (2008) | Torchwood: Children of Earth (2009) |

The soundtrack album was released on 7 July 2009, containing 40 tracks of incidental music composed by Ben Foster.

Unlike with the Torchwood: Original Television Soundtrack the album was released simultaneously for download with the official release of 7 July 2009.

==== Track listing ====
| Track no. | Track | Track length | Episodes used in |
|---|---|---|---|
| 1 | "The First Sacrifice" | 1:25 | "Day One" |
| 2 | "What's Occurring?" | 2:10 | "Day One" |
| 3 | "Jack's Daughter" | 1:28 | "Day One" |
| 4 | "Diplomatic Cars" | 1:20 | "Day One" |
| 5 | "We are Coming" | 1:12 | "Day One" |
| 6 | "Thames House" | 1:53 | "Day One" |
| 7 | "Double Crossed" | 1:26 | "Day One" |
| 8 | "Countdown to Destruction" | 1:52 | "Day One" |
| 9 | "The Crater" | 1:00 | "Day Two" |
| 10 | "Torchwood Hunted" | 1:42 | "Day Two" |
| 11 | "Gwen's Baby" | 1:03 | "Day Two" |
| 12 | "On The Run" | 1:13 | "Day Two" |
| 13 | "Jack in A Box" | 1:34 | "Day Two" |
| 14 | "Ianto Jones" | 0:50 | "Day Two" |
| 15 | "Tractor Attack" | 2:21 | "Day Two" |
| 16 | "Resurrection" | 1:11 | "Day Two" |
| 17 | "Clement MacDonald" | 2:05 | "Day Three" |
| 18 | "Something's Coming" | 2:35 | "Day Three" |
| 19 | "Eye Spy" | 1:20 | "Day Three" |
| 20 | "Trust Nobody" | 1:46 | "Day Three" |
| 21 | "The World Looks to the Skies" | 2:10 | "Day Three" |
| 22 | "Jack's Secret" | 1:36 | "Day Four" |
| 23 | "Clem Remembers" | 1:34 | "Day Four" |
| 24 | "Judgement Day | 4:05 | "Day Four" |
| 25 | "Requiem for the Fallen" | 1:23 | "Day Four" |
| 26 | "The Ballad of Ianto Jones" | 4:36 | "Day Four" |
| 27 | "The Final Day" | 0:40 | "Day Five" |
| 28 | "Calm Before the Storm" | 3:22 | "Day Five" |
| 29 | "Phase Two Has Begun" | 1:50 | "Day Five" |
| 30 | "Requisition 31" | 2:38 | "Day Five" |
| 31 | "He Was a Good Man" | 1:40 | "Day Five" |
| 32 | "The Children of The Earth" | 3:27 | "Day Five" |
| 33 | "Breaking the Connection" | 2:25 | "Day Five" |
| 34 | "Fighting Back" | 2:02 | "Day Five" |
| 35 | "Run for Your Lives" | 1:13 | "Day Five" |
| 36 | "Sacrifice and Salvation" | 1:39 | "Day Five" |
| 37 | "Redemption" | 3:13 | "Day Five" |
| 38 | "I Can Run Forever" | 3:28 | "Day Five" |
| 39 | "Here Comes Torchwood" | 2:24 | Various episodes |
| 40 | "Next Time on Torchwood" | 0:31 | Various episodes |

=== Home media ===
The Region 2 DVD release was released on 13 July 2009, followed by the Region 1 release on both DVD and Blu-ray on 28 July 2009. The Best Buy limited edition included the CD for the audio drama Lost Souls. Music for the fifth episode differed from the original broadcast version. The Region 4 DVD release became available on 1 October 2009.

== Reception ==
=== Reviews ===
The series was met with critical acclaim. Metacritic, an American review aggregator website, gives Children of Earth a normalised rating of 80 out of 100 (based on a sample of 12 reviews), indicating "generally favourable reviews", with the highest score being a 91 from Time and the lowest a 60 from The New York Times.

Daniel Martin ran a day-by-day review of the show on The Guardian's website guardian.co.uk which culminated in a positive assessment of the mini-series as a whole: " ... what an incredible week. From its hideous Sex Alien vs Cyberwoman beginnings, Torchwood has become a true treasure." He speculated on the programme's thematic implication that "as people realise their potential in this world, they die", and remarked: "If the same thing does happen to the series it would be awful. But God, it would be poetic."

Ben Rawson-Jones of Digital Spy gave a very favourable pre-review to the first three episodes of the serial. He particularly praised Davies' script for its "economical" and "seamless" re-establishment of the show's returning trio for new viewers whilst not alienating fans. The inter-weaving of the stories for "credible and appealing" supporting characters Rupesh, Clement and Lois was praised; as were the performances from Paul Copley and Liz May Brice. He did however feel that the second episode paled after the explosiveness of the first episode, on which they "failed to capitalise". Summing up the series, Rawson-Jones described Children of Earth as "a powerful human drama, reliant not on special effects but incredible acting, direction and writing" that was a "massive success."

IGN writer Ahsan Haque gave the miniseries a rating of 9.5 out of 10, also awarding it their Editor's Choice Award. John Barrowman's performance was highly praised, saying that he handled "these gut-wrenching moments with poise, yet manages to give us just enough to know how much his choices are tearing him up inside. He might not be able to die physically, but emotionally, what Jack has to suffer and live with is a fate far worse than death." Also, Haque felt that the additions of Rhiannon and Johnny "supply a lot of the grounded humanizing moments that really help the story stay grounded to the human condition, and not turn into a mindless sci-fi action-fest." However, Haque pointed out the "slightly campy feel" as well as technobabble as faults. The review ended with: "Best. Torchwood. Ever. Really, we mean it!"

Mike Hale of The New York Times was more mixed in his review, noting that the mini-series pays tribute to the 1960 British sci-fi film Village of the Damned, and sums up by saying "Children of Earth is still good fun, if not good, exactly." Hale also mentioned the problem with maintaining a 5-hour mini-series over 5 nights, a sentiment echoed by Los Angeles Times reviewer Robert Lloyd who felt that the format led to an inevitable lag in the middle.

Not all reviews were positive. Jim Shelley of The Daily Mirror gave the mini-series an unfavourable review, commenting that "Torchwood is the modern-day Blake's 7: ludicrous plot, hammy acting, an adolescent penchant for 'Issues'. This week's plot was plagiarised from 50s sci-fi classic, The Midwich Cuckoos. Contrary to its scheduling, Torchwood always seems to me like Dr Who lite." He went on to say that he felt a large part of the problem was with lead actor John Barrowman: "Unlike David Tennant's Doctor, Barrowman's endless appearances on friendly drivel like Tonight's the Night, The Kids Are All Right and Any Dream Will Do, is so over-exposed, 'Captain Jack' is about as intriguing or alien as a Weetabix and twice as irritating. Unlike Tennant, as an actor he is just not good enough."

=== Fan reaction ===
The death of Ianto Jones in Children of Earth triggered protests from fans of the show, including the "Save Ianto Jones" campaign, which collected more than £10,000 for the Children in Need charity. Other fans resorted to abuse and threats, causing writer James Moran to fire off an angry missive in a blog post. Showrunner Russell T Davies made no apologies for the decision to kill off the character, saying, "I'm just delighted that the fans are so wrapped up in the character to have that reaction." Writer John Fay, in executing Davies' vision, noted that Ianto's death was a means for the viewer to see the price of Jack's immortality and seeing those he cares for die around him. Ianto's death led several fans to accuse the show's creators of subscribing to homophobic narrative conventions. AfterElton, one of the websites critical of the decision, later published an opposing view that analysed the death in view of the character's earlier refusal to admit to his relationship, and claimed that, instead of being an expression of homophobia, the death was a sign that the LGBT community was leaving behind its image of victimhood.

=== Awards ===
In 2010, Children of Earth won the BAFTA Cymru award for best drama series, a Saturn Award for Best Television Presentation during the 36th Saturn Awards and a 2010 Celtic Media Festival Award for best drama series. It was also nominated for a GLAAD Media Award by the Gay & Lesbian Alliance Against Defamation for Outstanding TV Movie or Mini-Series during the 21st GLAAD Media Awards and for a Television Critics Association Award for Outstanding Achievement in Movies, Miniseries and Specials, but the awards lost to Prayers for Bobby and The Pacific, respectively. Lead actress Eve Myles won the 'Best Actress" award in the SFX Reader's awards poll, and was crowned best actress in the 11th annual Airlock Alpha Portal Awards. Myles was also nominated for a 2010 BAFTA Cymru Best Actress award, whilst John Barrowman made the shortlist of the 2010 TV Choice Awards, where he was up against Eleventh Doctor actor Matt Smith.
