= Crash (American TV series) =

- Created by: Glen Mazzara
- Starring: Dennis Hopper; Arlene Tur; Ross McCall; Jocko Sims; Moran Atias; Tom Sizemore; Dana Ashbrook; Eric Roberts; Jake McLaughlin; Julie Warner; Keith Carradine; Linda Park; Tess Harper; Valerie Perrine
- Composer: Mark Isham
- Country of origin: United States
- Original language: English
- No. of seasons: 2
- No. of episodes: 26

Production
- Executive producers: Glen Mazzara; Paul Haggis; Robert Moresco; Bob Yari
- Production locations: Albuquerque, New Mexico
- Camera setup: Single-camera
- Running time: 60 minutes
- Production companies: Starz Inc. Lionsgate Television; Yari Film Group

Original release
- Network: Starz
- Release: October 17, 2008 – December 18, 2009

Crash is an American drama television series set in Los Angeles, California that stars Dennis Hopper and Eric Roberts. It is the first original drama series produced by Starz. The network ordered a 13-episode season which premiered on October 17, 2008. The series is based on the 2004 film of the same title. It was developed for television by Glen Mazzara. In Canada, Crash can be seen on Super Channel. Starz ordered a second season that premiered in September 2009.

== Production ==
=== Conception ===
Starz began looking to develop original television series after the success of series developed by its rivals Showtime and HBO and advertised funding and creative freedom for original programming projects. Crash is the network's first foray into original scripted drama and is based on the Academy Award-winning 2004 film of the same name. The writers of the film, Paul Haggis and Robert Moresco, were interested in developing a series based on the property. Lionsgate and Starz collaborated on developing the series for television.

Television writer and producer Glen Mazzara was brought in as an executive producer for the series. Mazzara has worked extensively as a writer and producer on The Shield and had developed new projects for the other networks including Life and Standoff.

=== Crew ===
Glen Mazzara served as the series executive producer and showrunner. The film's writers Paul Haggis and Robert Moresco and producer Bob Yari joined Mazzara as executive producers. Thomas Becker, Mark R. Harris, Tom Nunan, and Jorg Westerkamp all worked as producers or production executives on the original film project and are credited as co-executive producers on the series. Movie actor Don Cheadle, who was a star and producer of the 2004 film, is also on board as a co-executive producer.

Mazzara hired a writing staff that he felt was used to coping with edgier material. Co-executive producer and writer Frank Renzulli had previously worked on HBO drama The Sopranos. Co-executive producer and writer Ted Mann worked on HBO drama Deadwood. Producer and writer Stacy Rukeyser worked with Mazzara on Standoff. Executive story editor Chris Collins came from the recently completed HBO drama The Wire. Executive story editor Randy Huggins had previously worked with Mazzara on The Shield.

The pilot episode was directed by Sanford Bookstaver.

=== Cast ===
The first season starred:

- Dennis Hopper as record producer Ben Cendars
- Ross McCall as police officer Kenny Battaglia
- Arlene Tur as actress-turned-police officer partner Bebe Arcel
- Clare Carey as Brentwood mother Christine Emory
- D. B. Sweeney as Peter Emory, her real-estate developer husband
- Brian Tee as former gang member-turned-EMT Eddie Choi
- Jocko Sims as street-smart driver Anthony Adams
- Luis Chávez as undocumented Guatemalan immigrant Cesar Uman
- Moran Atias as Inez
- Nick E. Tarabay as a detective Axel Finet
- Trilby Glover as his wife Ann Finet
- Tom Sizemore as Detective Adrian Cooper.

In season 2 new cast members:

- Eric Roberts as billionaire Seth Blanchard,
- Dana Ashbrook as LA crook Jimmy,
- Linda Park as Blanchard's wife and children's author Maggie, and
- Jake McLaughlin a former high school pitching ace now working for his diabetic mom (Tess Harper) in a hobby store.

Battaglia is a security guard and then begins working for Blanchard and some of the cast members from season 1, Tur, Carey, Sweeney, Tee, Chavez, Tarabay and Sizemore do not return for season 2. Jenny Mollen plays Tess, the new girlfriend to Kenny Battaglia.

== Episodes ==
=== Season 1 (2008–09) ===
No.	Title	Directed by	Written by	Original release date
1	"Episode One"	Sanford Bookstaver	Glen Mazzara	October 17, 2008
2	"The Doctor Is in"	Robert Moresco	Frank Renzulli	October 17, 2008
3	"Panic"	Seith Mann	Stacy Rukeyser	October 24, 2008
4	"Railroaded"	Allison Liddi	Sang Kyu Kim	October 31, 2008
5	"Your Ass Belongs to the Gypsies"	Sanford Bookstaver	Ted Mann	November 7, 2008
6	"Clusterfuck"	Guy Ferland	Randy Huggins	November 14, 2008
7	"Los Muertos"	Robert Moresco	Chris Collins	November 21, 2008
8	"Three Men and a Bebe"	Stefan Schwartz	Glen Mazzara	December 5, 2008
9	"Pissing in the Sandbox"	Stefan Schwartz	Sang Kyu Kim	December 12, 2008
10	"The Future Is Free"	David Barrett	Stacy Rukeyser	December 19, 2008
11	"F-36, Sprint Left, T-4"	Phil Abraham	Michael Thomas	December 26, 2008
12	"Ring Dings"	Stefan Schwartz	Frank Renzulli	January 2, 2009
13	"The Pain Won't Stop"	Stefan Schwartz	Glen Mazzara	January 9, 2009

=== Season 2 (2009) ===
No.	Title	Directed by	Written by	Original release date
14	"You Set the Scene"	Andrew Bernstein	Ira Steven Behr	September 18, 2009
15	"Always See Your Face"	Andrew Bernstein	James DeMonaco	September 25, 2009
16	"The World's a Mess, It's in My Kiss"	Stefan Schwartz	Todd Harthan	October 3, 2009
17	"Can't Explain"	Stefan Schwartz	Devon Shepard	October 9, 2009
18	"You, I'll Be Following"	Bill Eagles	Elizabeth Benjamin	October 16, 2009
19	"No Matter What You Do"	Vincent Misiano	Jennifer Schuur	October 30, 2009
20	"Johnny Hit and Run Pauline"	John Behring	Adam Levy	November 6, 2009
21	"Lovers in Captivity"	Stefan Schwartz	James DeMonaco	November 13, 2009
22	"Endangered Species"	Colin Bucksey	Todd Harthan	November 20, 2009
23	"Master of Puppets"	Peter Markle	Elizabeth Benjamin	November 27, 2009
24	"Calm Like a Bomb"	Jerry Levine	Jennifer Schuur	December 4, 2009
25	"Alone Again Or…"	Bill Eagles	Ira Steven Behr	December 11, 2009
26	"Los Angeles"	Vincent Misiano	Ira Steven Behr	December 18, 2009

== Reception ==
Reviews of the series have been mixed: Ginia Bellafante of The New York Times said "The show is hardly the most original depiction of Los Angeles, but has a noirish appeal, and ambitions to tell a big story". On the other hand, Variety's Brian Lowry wrote: "There's not a whit of originality to it," and "The show possesses less substance than a brisk Santa Ana wind." According to Matthew Gilbert of The Boston Globe, "None of the stories or characters is remotely interesting".

== Home media ==
The first season of Crash was released on DVD in the USA by Starz under its subsidiary Anchor Bay Entertainment on September 15, 2009. The second season was released through Amazon.com on September 15, 2010.
