= Rex Matheson =

- Torchwood character
- First appearance: "The New World" (2011)
- Last appearance: "The Blood Line" (2011)
- Portrayed by: Mekhi Phifer

In-universe information
- Affiliation: Central Intelligence Agency; Torchwood Institute
- Home era: Early 21st century

Agent Rex Matheson, portrayed by Mekhi Phifer, is a fictional character in the BBC television programme Torchwood, a spin-off from the long-running series Doctor Who. Phifer was one of three American actors to join Torchwood in its fourth series, Torchwood: Miracle Day (2011), as part of a then-new co-production between Torchwood's British network, BBC One, and its American financiers on US premium television network Starz.

Rex is introduced by series producer Russell T Davies as a means of introducing new American audiences to the established world of Torchwood. Within the series' narrative, Rex is a high-flying agent for the Central Intelligence Agency (CIA) who begins to investigate Torchwood after being personally affected by a global supernatural event. Rex's role as a second male hero in the series leads him to clash with returning male lead Captain Jack Harkness (John Barrowman). He eventually becomes immortal in the same vein as Harkness.

== Appearances ==
=== Television ===
Rex first appears in Miracle Day's premiere episode, "The New World". Rex finds himself impaled but survives, and discovers no one in the whole world can die anymore. He and CIA coworker Esther Drummond (Alexa Havins) begin investigating the defunct British Torchwood Institute, which leads him to discover its last-surviving agents: former time traveler Captain Jack Harkness (John Barrowman) and a Welsh young mother Gwen Cooper (Eve Myles). After renditioning Jack and Gwen to the United States, Rex realises that due to his knowledge of Torchwood, he has been set up and betrayed by the CIA and goes into hiding with the Torchwood team. In "Dead of Night", he continues to rely on Vera Juarez (Arlene Tur) for medical attention for his chest wound, despite being in hiding. The two begin a sexual relationship and he subsequently enlists her to spy for the resconsituted Torchwood team. Rex is horrified when Vera is later burned alive whilst undercover on a mission in San Pedro and whilst trying to escape with evidence of the crime he is captured and tortured by her murderer, Colin Maloney (Marc Vann). He is rescued by Esther, whom he subsequently aids in saving Jack and Gwen from a hostage scenario. Rex clears his name with the CIA by exposing the real traitor Brian Friedkin (Wayne Knight) and rejoins the organisation whilst Gwen, Jack and Esther go back into hiding. In the series finale Rex travels to Buenos Aires to meet Esther, whilst Jack and Gwen head to Shanghai, each pair seeking one of two access points to the Blessing, an antipodal geological formation connected to the Earth's morphic field. Flashbacks reveal that Esther has transfused Rex with Jack's mortal blood; by releasing this blood the two men are able to reset the human morphic field and restore death. At Esther's funeral Rex discovers that he has acquired Jack's self healing abilities when he is shot by the Families' CIA mole Charlotte (Marina Benedict) and resurrects.

=== Literature ===
The Torchwood novel The Men Who Sold The World by Guy Adams, released August 2011, focuses primarily on Rex. Adams' novel is a Miracle Day tie-in and prequel. A spy thriller, The Men Who Sold The World follows the CIA's involvement when the British government sells off Torchwood's collection of weapons to the Americans. SFX reviewer Alasdair Stuart felt that the Adams' "own flair for the unpleasant" highly complimented "cheerfully nasty Rex", and commended Adams for exploring the contradiction between Rex's ruthless goal-drivenness and human goodness, as well as "bravely" exploring the context for his relationship with Esther.

== Creation and conception ==
Casting calls differed from the final press release; early casting class specified that Matheson was to be played by a White actor, with One Tree Hill's Chad Michael Murray and Dollhouse's Enver Gjokaj among those auditioning for the part of Rex. Phifer's casting was reported on 14 December 2010, with a BBC press release confirming this announcement on 8 January 2011.

Davies introduces Rex in Miracle Day to act as a new audience surrogate who initially learn about the disbanded Torchwood Institute, and Torchwood's three-series history, through his investigations, providing an entrance into the new story for new viewers. A Harvard University-educated African American, Rex is described by promotional material as "the embodiment of the American dream"; he has been all his life. Rex is "destined for success" and it is said that he could become rich in a variety of career paths, yet opted for the CIA because "he believes in justice and will fight for it". Rex's charisma is of great use in his line of work: "He can talk his way into anything, then charm his way out, fast."

Rex joins Torchwood in Miracle Day a second male hero in the series. Shantella Sherman-Wi writes: "On first glance, it’s unclear whether the Torchwood franchise can handle two powerful and handsome leading men, but Phifer and Barrowman make it work – and look good in the process." Returning lead Jack Harkness and Rex clash initially, however, because as Phifer puts it, they have "different approaches to things" and Rex has not "figured him out yet". In part, this owes to Rex's very black and white thinking. However, over the course of Miracle Day, Rex will gradually succumb to the morally grey and obtuse thinking that characterises the Torchwood world. Rex also comes into conflict with returning Torchwood heroine Gwen Cooper, due to them both having strong, outspoken personalities and worldviews. However, series creator Russell T Davies explains that new supporting heroine Esther will play a key role in the two of them becoming friends. Esther is "a very healing force" and "makes everything alright between them" due to her empathetic nature and people skills.
