= Kai Owen =

Welsh actor (born 1975)

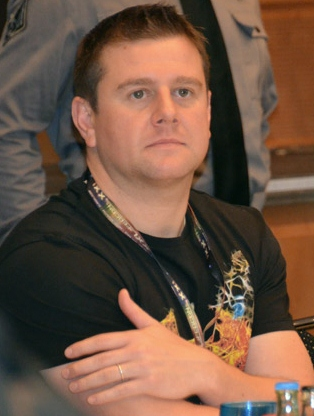
- Owen in 2012
- Born: 4 September 1975 (age 51); Llanrwst, Conwy, Wales
- Occupation: Actor
- Years active: 1998–present
- Website: www.kaiowen.com

Kai Owen (born 4 September 1975) is a Welsh actor of stage and screen, known to Welsh audiences for his numerous roles on Welsh language television and to worldwide audiences for his portrayal of Rhys Williams in Torchwood and Pete Buchanan in Hollyoaks.

== Background and personal life ==
Owen was born in the town of Llanrwst in the Conwy Valley in North Wales, where his family still lives. His father Mark is a GMB union official and his mother Yvonne is a cleaner at the British Legion Club. He was educated at Watling Street Primary School, Llanrwst and Ysgol Dyffryn Conwy. He attended Mountview Theatre School, London for three years, graduating in 1998. Owen lived with his actor fiancée Sarah Wilson in East Finchley, London and in 2010 moved with son Bobby to Warwickshire.

He ran the 2009 London Marathon for the children's cancer charity CLIC Sargent, and also ran the Virgin London Marathon on 25 April 2010. He is a patron of Llandudno Youth Musical Theatre.

== Television career ==
He became first known as Kev, a gay roofer in Tipyn o Stad, shown on Welsh-language channel S4C. He was a regular in several series (52 episodes) of this popular gritty Welsh television programme; he also appeared in S4C's Treflan as character Bob Lewis. In 2009 he guested as Harri in the second series of Y Pris and as violent loan shark Craig Turner in Pobol Y Cwm (one episode, broadcast 11 September 2009; he appeared in a similar guest role in the show in August and in October 2012).

Owen's first appearance on English-language UK television came in 2001, when he appeared as Buster Edwards in the episode Dog Dago Afternoon of series Fun at the Funeral Parlour. In 2003 he guested in an episode of BBC One television series Casualty (episode 392, Stuck in the Middle With You, 19 April 2003, as Danny). In 2005 he played the character of Dave 'Shiner' Owen in all six episodes of the series Rocket Man, a BBC One television series about a man trying to launch his dead wife's ashes into space.

2006 saw Owen cast as recurring character Rhys Williams in Torchwood, a spin-off from the science fiction television series Doctor Who, a role for which he has become most renowned. He was elevated to star billing for the third series, broadcast on BBC One in summer 2009, reflecting his growing role in the series. He reprised his role in the fourth series of Torchwood - Torchwood: Miracle Day, broadcast during summer 2011.

Owen appeared in an episode of Celebrity Ready Steady Cook with Torchwood co-star Tom Price (Andy) (recorded 26 August 2009, broadcast 8 January 2010).

In 2011, Owen appeared in the first episode of the third series of Being Human as Bob, leader of a dogging pack. He appears in the 14th episode of the seventh series of long running BBC school drama Waterloo Road as former rugby pro Ken Watling. He appeared in an episode of the 2012 Kay Mellor drama The Syndicate, broadcast on BBC One.

In 2015, Owen joined the cast of the Channel 4 soap opera Hollyoaks playing Pete Buchanan, the ex-partner of Reenie McQueen (Zöe Lucker) and a perpetrator of child abuse. In preparation for the role, he liaised with the NSPCC. After portraying the role until a year later, he made a brief return in 2018. He is also set to reprise the role in April 2021.

== Filmography ==
=== Television ===
Year(s)	Title	Role	Notes
2001	Fun at the Funeral Parlour	P.C Hertz	TV episode - "Death in the Valleys" and "The Jaws of Doom"
2002	Fun at the Funeral Parlour	Buster Edwards	TV episode - "Dog Dango Afternoon "
2003	Casualty	Danny	TV episode - "Stuck in the Middle with You"
2003–2006	Tipyn o Stad	Kev Evans	Series regular; series 2–5
2005	Rocket Man	David 'Shiner' Owen	Six episodes; main role
2006–2011	Torchwood	Rhys Williams	Recurring cast series 1–2; Main Cast series 3–4
2011	Being Human	Bob	Episode #3.1 - "Lia"
2011	Waterloo Road	Ken Watling	Episode #7.14
2012	The Syndicate	Gareth Powell	Episode #1.4
2015	Doc Martin		Episode #7.4 - "Education, Education, Education"
2015–2016, 2018, 2021	Hollyoaks	Pete Buchanan	Series regular
2019	Doctors	Mark Albany	1 episode
2022	Casualty	Sergeant Taylor	1 episode
2024	Mr Bates vs The Post Office	Retail Manager	1 episode

=== Narration/Radio ===
Year(s)	Title	Role	Notes
2007	Ying Tong: a Walk with the Goons	Harry Secombe	Radio Play by Roy Smiles
2009	"The Dead Line"	Rhys Williams	Torchwood Radio Plays (BBC Radio 4)
2011	"The Devil and Miss Carew'"	Rhys Williams	Torchwood Radio Plays (BBC Radio 4)
2011	Ghost Train	Narrator	Torchwood audiobook
2011	Department X	Narrator	Torchwood audiobook
2011	First Born	Narrator	Torchwood audiobook
2012	Army of One	Narrator	Torchwood audiobook
2015–present	Torchwood	Rhys Williams	Big Finish Productions
2017	Tracks	Ifan	BBC Cymru Wales

=== Stage ===
Year(s)	Title	Role	Notes
1998	The Tempest	Ariel	Performed at Stafford Castle
2005	Life of Ryan... and Ronnie	Ronnie	
2006	A Chorus of Disapproval	Crispin Usher	
2008	Adam & Steve	Adam	
2012	As You Like It	Charles	Clwyd Theatr Cymru
2025/26	Cinderella	Dandini	Regent Theatre, Stoke-on-Trent
