= Esther Drummond =

Fictional character in Torchwood

- Torchwood character
- Alexa Havins as Esther Drummond in Torchwood episode "End of the Road"
- First appearance: "The New World" (2011)
- Last appearance: "The Blood Line" (2011)
- Portrayed by: Alexa Havins

In-universe information
- Affiliation: CIA; Torchwood Institute
- Home era: Early 21st century

Esther Drummond, portrayed by Alexa Havins, is a fictional character in the BBC television programme Torchwood, a spin-off from the long-running series Doctor Who. Havins is one of several American actors to join Torchwood in its fourth series, Torchwood: Miracle Day, which was co-produced by Torchwood's original British network BBC One and the American television network Starz. The character appears in every episode of the fourth series in addition to a prequel novel, The Men Who Sold the World.

Within the series narrative, Esther is a Central Intelligence Agency (CIA) watch analyst who becomes aware of the defunct British Torchwood Institute on "Miracle Day", when it is discovered that no one can die. Alongside her CIA colleague Rex Matheson she joins forces with the last two remaining Torchwood agents to investigate the phenomenon. Esther's standing as a desk-bound computer and technology expert puts her in contrast with the tougher and more action-orientated characters in the series. By the Miracle Day finale, Esther has become a more competent field agent, but is murdered by the group's enemies in an attempt to stop them progressing with their mission.

Havins was influenced in her decision to accept the part by her husband's appreciation of the series. Like Rex, Esther is used by executive producer Russell T Davies as a means of introducing new American audiences to the established mythos of Torchwood. Havins stated the character to have an unrequited love for Rex, but explained that he does not appear to notice. Response to the character varied; some critics praised her characterisation and portrayal whilst others felt her to display incompetency and to not have been taken to by the audience. The nature of her exit from the show was generally praised, though some reviewers felt it lacked the desired emotional impact.

== Appearances ==
=== Television ===
Esther Drummond, a Central Intelligence Agency (CIA) watch analyst, makes her first appearance in Torchwood: Miracle Day's premiere episode "The New World" in which she informs colleague Rex Matheson (Mekhi Phifer) about a mysterious message containing the single word "Torchwood". A distracted Rex is then fatally injured, leading Esther to blame herself for his accident. After finding out the process of death has been ceased in a global event termed "Miracle Day", Esther begins tracking down information on Torchwood, supposing a link between the organisation and the start of "Miracle Day". Amid her research, she encounters former head of Torchwood, Captain Jack Harkness (John Barrowman), who helps her escape the destructive blast of a suicide bomber. Harkness explains the history of the Torchwood Institute, but wipes Esther's memory so she will not remember their encounter. Esther's memory is later triggered when a hard copy of the Torchwood file lands on her desk. Esther's investigation into Torchwood compromises her position within the CIA and she — like Rex — is set up by the agency. Forced into fugitive status, she finds herself working as part of Torchwood alongside Rex and the Torchwood Institute's last surviving members, Captain Jack and Gwen Cooper (Eve Myles).

Esther fulfills Torchwood's technical need for a competent hacker, researcher and computer expert. However, she initially struggles as a field agent, nearly compromising the team's mission when she attempts to get help for her mentally ill sister Sarah (Candace Brown). Later whilst trying to escape during an undercover mission in an effective concentration camp, in which the gravely wounded are incinerated, Esther strangles Colin Maloney (Marc Vann) in unarmed combat, leaving her aghast and shaken. In the following episode, Esther works out that Gwen is being blackmailed into delivering Jack to an unknown conspirator; she has Gwen's parents liberated by Sergeant Andy Davidson (Tom Price), and alongside Rex, successfully snipes Jack's would-be captors. The Torchwood team subsequently end up in CIA custody. Though Esther is pardoned alongside Rex, Jack is shot as he tries to escape, leaving Esther with the responsibility of keeping him safe on the run. Two months later, in "The Gathering", Esther has nursed Jack to health in Scotland where she drains his blood, believing it connected to the Miracle. The team learn that the Miracle originated at the near-antipodes of Shanghai and Buenos Aires; the team splits up, with Esther and Rex in the latter location. The series finale, "The Blood Line", sees Esther fatally shot by a member of The Three Families — the villains behind Miracle Day — in an attempt to prevent Torchwood ending the Miracle, but Gwen persuades Jack and Rex that Esther has to die so that the Miracle can be ended. In the episode's epilogue, Esther is among the few post miracle deceased to be allowed a full funeral service.

=== Literature ===
Esther features as a supporting character in the novel The Men Who Sold The World, which is featured as a prequel to Torchwood: Miracle Day. In the novel, Esther aids Rex in his mission to track down a CIA contingent who have gone rogue with dangerous alien weaponry. Reviewing the novel, SFX columnist Alasdair Stuart commented that author Guy Adams provided "interesting, and brave, context to Rex’s relationship with Esther." According to Stuart, The Men Who Sold The World demonstrated that "Rex knows he manipulates her and doesn’t particularly care. She’s an asset, just one he can use better and faster than most".

== Characterisation ==
=== Casting ===
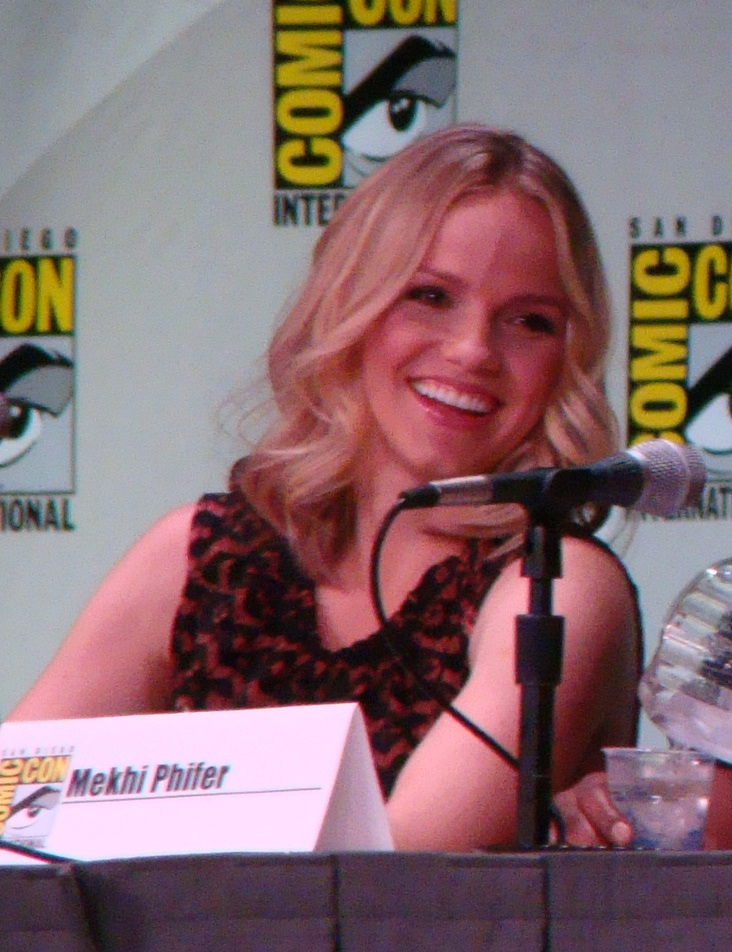
Alexa Havins (pictured) stated that her husband played an important role in her decision to join Torchwood.

In the series' planning stages, Esther's surname was originally Katusi, and the casting call specified that this role would be for a non-Caucasian actress. Greek star Amber Stevens was one of the actresses who auditioned for the part of Katusi. However, white actress Alexa Havins was announced by the BBC on 6 January 2011, the character's surname having been changed to Drummond. Havins was not initially sure about accepting the role when she was offered it due to having recently become a mother. She revealed that her husband, actor Justin Bruening, being a Torchwood "fan-boy" influenced her decision to accept the role, stating that he told her "you've got to take this part" and offered to assume child-minding responsibilities. In preparation for the role Havins watched some of the earlier series of Torchwood to acquire a sense of the show's tone, but did not fully immerse herself in the show's history because, given her character's ignorance, "not being so well-versed in it played in my favour".

=== Concept and development ===
Esther is introduced in press materials as being "an innocent in a world of assassins, liars and zealots". Havins describes Drummond as "an optimist and the glass is half full person". A promotional video released by Starz provided background information on Esther including her college education—the character introduces herself by stating that she has a BA in Linguistics and a Masters in Cognitive science. Series four writer Jane Espenson enjoyed writing for Esther as she felt the character to be most similar to herself. She notes that when devising Esther's backstory the writer's "ended up just putting my college experience down." Esther's introduction invites parallels that of lead female character Gwen Cooper (Eve Myles) in the series' 2006 premiere episode "Everything Changes"; she represents an audience surrogate for new American viewers. Havins refers to Esther as the "tour guide" for new viewers coming to Torchwood for the first time, one who is "digging deeper and deeper into the rabbit hole". Despite similarities to their introduction, Havins comments that Esther as a character has a less action-orientated role than Gwen, being more the "techie" of the team who uses her intellect and technology as her weapons. The actress feels that Esther's desk-bound analyst position is "her safe little world". Head writer and executive producer Russell T Davies described Esther as "a very healing force" in helping the other more outspoken characters gel together as a team because she is "much more able to empathise with people." The character's sister, Sarah Drummond (Candace Brown), recurs throughout Miracle Day, Havins feels that her presence helps "humanise the situation" as including family members helps the audience "understand why people react a certain way." Espenson notes that the first scene between Esther and Sarah was discussed at length at the writer's room—the writers chose to make Esther's choice whether or not to refer her ill sister to social services "as difficult as possible" to heighten the pain felt by the character.

"It does bring out the best for her. It affects her because she has family that she’s away from. It’s a really lonely world that she hasn’t experienced before, and you see her slowly grow out of it, and she catches her stride a few episodes in".

— Alexa Havins, on Esther's development during Miracle Day.

Esther has a romantic interest in Rex Matheson (Mekhi Phifer), who she idealises and looks up to. Despite her feelings, Rex does not appear to notice or reciprocate, actress Alexa Havins conjectures that "he's so blind to her feelings" due to him having "this wall built up around him that it's hard to break through." Phifer commented that Rex sees Esther as a sister and conjectures that Esther's interests in him are partly a result of her sensationalising his work. Despite her highly romanticised idea of field work, Esther is not as skilled in the field as more experienced agents Rex, Jack (John Barrowman) and Gwen. However, being part of a new Torchwood team means that Esther is "ripped away from her desk and thrust into the world of Torchwood on the run." During the later parts of the series the character has to fight physically against the team's enemies. Havins did not receive any training for these sequences, she felt that having been trained in fight sequences would have made Esther "too slick, too trained, too perfect, too in sync with the rest of the Torchwood crew." Instead of being able to take out her attackers easily, when Esther has to fight for her life it is "raw and brutal" and "almost like a bar-brawl meets a chick-fight". Espenson notes that by the final episode Esther has earned a degree of admiration from Rex through her work for the Torchwood team, which she feels to be because "he just can't fail to see how smart and brave she is." In regards to being killed off Havins states that she knew it was a possibility from the moment she accepted the role due to the danger present in the series and its precedence for killing characters. io9's Charlie Jane Anders observed that the character's death helps serve to illustrate "how hard it is to consign others to death, for the greater good."

== Reception ==
After the fourth series premiere TV.com's Tim Surette wrote that Esther "is fantastic as the Torchwood newbie, holding hands with viewers who've never watched the series before." The HD Room's James Zappie praised the friendship between Esther and Gwen stating that "It isn't a trite Cagney & Lacey wannabe pairing of two female characters" and instead offers a chance for the two actresses "to branch out and add complexity to their characters' personalities". Den of Geek's Simon Brew felt the character's storyline with her sister in "Escape to L.A." to be "welcome exposition, and Alexa Havins is proving to be an excellent bit of casting". Digital Spy's Morgan Jeffrey stated that throughout the fourth series, "Alexa Havins was consistently excellent, bringing a real warmth and likability to her role." The character attracted comparisons to previous Torchwood characters. Dan Martin wrote after the broadcast of "Rendition" that the character of Esther "is shaping up as a Toshiko-style tragedy queen". Dave Golder, writing for SFX noted the character's incompetency in the episode "Escape to L.A." showed her to be "every bit as incapable of acting professionally for more than 60 seconds as Owen and Tosh were back in the old days."

Golder identified "Esther’s scarily casual death" as one of the gripping points of what he felt to be an underwhelming finale. The Daily Telegraph's Gavin Fuller referred to her exit as "being a genuine, and saddening shock." Jeffrey praised the character's death as a "well-handled shocker", noting that all signs had indicated Rex would die instead. He felt it was "cruel trick on the writers' part to off lovely Agent Drummond" and "all the crueler to keep viewings hanging until that first glimpse of her funeral." He concluded by saying that "this kind of emotional sucker-punch" is something Torchwood has always excelled at. Neela Debnath of The Independent commented that her death was sad because the "character went through so much" and that "there would have been room for more growth in subsequent series." Conversely, Los Angeles Times correspondent Emily VanDerWerff opined that it was hard to invest in Esther, in addition to Rex and Oswald, and though her death was intended as the "one big, emotional moment of the finale" it came across to him as "kind of a dud". She felt that throughout the fourth series Esther was used as "simply a plot device, someone the writers used when they needed something to go wrong or when they needed the story to move in a certain direction." Blair Marnell of CraveOnline also notes in his review of the series finale that "Rex and Esther never really caught on as leading characters" and felt that it would have been better had the characters departed in symmetry.
