= Arlene Tur =

American actress

- Born: Miami, Florida, U.S.
- Occupations: Actress, model
- Years active: 2003–present

Arlene Tur is an American actress, television presenter, producer and model of Cuban descent. She is best known for her roles as Armenia in Eat Pray Love opposite Julia Roberts and Javier Bardem, as Bebe Arcel in the Starz series Crash, and as Vera Juarez in the BBC’s Torchwood: Miracle Day.

== Early life ==
Tur was born in Miami, Florida, the only child of Cuban political refugees. She attended Florida International University, where she graduated with dual degrees in Marketing and Public Relations. During college, she played professional beach volleyball and began her modeling career after being approached by modeling agents.

== Career ==
Tur started her career in the entertainment industry as a model before transitioning into acting. She studied acting at HB Studios in New York City and Howard Fine in Los Angeles. Her first role was a lead in the 2003 Telemundo/NBC Hispanic comedy series Los Teens. Tur had a guest-star appearance on Grey's Anatomy in 2006 and starred in NBC's Haskett's Chance and the action film Final Engagement alongside Peter O'Toole. Tur gained network attention for her comedic performance in the ABC/Paramount pilot Harry Green and Eugene opposite Jason Segel and Mark Valley, leading to a holding deal with ABC and Touchstone Television. In 2008, she was cast as LAPD officer Bebe Arcel in Crash starring alongside Dennis Hopper. In 2011, she had a recurring role in the BBC sci-fi drama Torchwood: Miracle Day as surgeon Vera Juarez. Tur has guest-starred in multiple television series, including Jinji Kohan’s Netflix series Teenage Bounty Hunters, The Rookie: Feds, and Lie to Me. Most recently, she stars in the Netflix film That's Amor.

== Other work ==
Aside from acting, Tur has hosted shows for the Discovery Channel, E! Entertainment Television, the Travel Channel, and Univision. In August 2011, she appeared on Top Gear for the "Big Star, Small Car" segment, recording the fastest time among celebrities at that point. More recently, she has been involved in producing films, with upcoming projects including We All Want The Same Thing and Dry Rain. Tur is also an entrepreneur and investor, most recently working on social media platform for artists The Rise with comedian and creator Monique Marvez.

== Personal life ==
Tur lives in Miami, Florida.

== Filmography ==
Year	Title	Role	Notes
2003	Los Teens	Valeria	Telemundo/NBC
2004	Harry Green and Eugene	Nadalina	with Jason Segel and Mark Valley
2006	Grey's Anatomy	Pamela Calva	S2, E18: Yesterday
2006	Haskett's Chance	Lucia Rodriguez	NBC
2007	Final Engagement	Jacqueline Bombay	with Peter O'Toole
2008–2009	Crash	Bebe Arcel	Starz series
2009	Lie to Me	Kimi	S2, E6: Lack of Candor
2010	Eat Pray Love	Armenia	with Julia Roberts and Javier Bardem
2011	Torchwood: Miracle Day	Vera Juarez	BBC
2011	Top Gear USA	Herself	S2, E5: Luxury Car Challenge
2012	Hollywood Heights	Police Officer	Nickelodeon
2012	The Beach Chronicles AGX	Andromeda	short film
2020	Teenage Bounty Hunters	Michelle	Netflix
2022	That's Amor	Viviana	Netflix
2023	The Rookie: Feds	Mayra Perez	ABC
2024	Jackpot (The Origin Story)	Dina	short film
2024	We All Want the Same Thing	producer	pre-production
