= Torchwood Institute =

Fictional secret organization in the Doctor Who and Torchwood universe

Torchwood
- Whoniverse organization
- Torchwood logo, composed of hexagons arranged in the shape of the letter T. Other colored versions occur – for example, a red version appears in the intertitle for Torchwood, and a blue version appears on the show's microsite.

In-universe information
- Type: Intelligence agency
- Founded: Aberdeenshire, Scotland, 1879 by Queen Victoria
- Defunct: 2009
- Location: Various: Torchwood One: London, England; Torchwood Two: Glasgow, Scotland; Torchwood Three: Cardiff, Wales; Torchwood Four: "Missing", Torchwood India: Delhi, India
- Key people: Queen Victoria; Yvonne Hartman; Captain Jack Harkness; Ianto Jones; Gwen Cooper; Pete Tyler; Dr Owen Harper; Toshiko Sato
- Purpose: Extraterrestrial research Protecting Britain; Developing new technologies Arming humanity for the future
- Technologies: Dimensional transporter Particle gun Large energy weapon Weight negation clamps Huon particles And more...
- Powers: Torchwood is a vastly powerful organisation, as such it possesses: Wealth to build skyscraper and underground complex as headquarters; Influence beyond Prime Minister of the United Kingdom and UN; Staff given "psychic training", described as "basic mental training, level 1" which includes "psi shielding" as a defense from as well as utilization of telepathy; Vast array of alien technology and weaponry

The Torchwood Institute, or simply Torchwood, is a fictional secret organisation from the British science fiction television series Doctor Who and its spin-off series Torchwood. It was established in 1879 by Queen Victoria after the events of "Tooth and Claw". Its prime directive is to defend Earth against supernatural and extraterrestrial threats. It is later revealed in "Army of Ghosts" that the Torchwood Institute has begun to use their findings to restore the British Empire to its former glory. To those ends, the organisation started to acquire and reverse engineer alien technology. Within Torchwood, an unofficial slogan evolved: "If it's alien, it's ours". According to one base director, Yvonne Hartman, its nationalist attitude includes refusing to use metric units.

While described as "beyond the UN", the Torchwood Institute is seen to cooperate with UNIT to some extent. There appears to have been some rapport with the Prime Minister, although it is noted by Harriet Jones in "The Christmas Invasion" that she is not meant to know the existence of Torchwood. Those who have come into contact with Torchwood primarily believe it to be a special forces team. Torchwood maintains this illusion by using false witnesses, or by sectioning any journalists who threaten to expose the truth, and via the use of memory-altering drugs. Following a major incident which led to the destruction of Torchwood One, Jack Harkness rebuilds Torchwood to become less confrontational and more secretive in honour of the Doctor.

== Creation ==
The name "Torchwood" is an anagram of "Doctor Who", with which tapes of series 1 of the revived Doctor Who TV series were labelled to prevent the footage from being leaked. While writing Doctor Who series 2, head writer and executive producer Russell T Davies established the word "Torchwood"—which was the name of an institute previously mentioned in the episode "Bad Wolf" (2005)—in his script for the 2005 Christmas Special "The Christmas Invasion", both as a motif of the series similar to the "Bad Wolf" motif in series 1, and as a lead-in to the Torchwood spin-off series Davies was planning for BBC Three. Torchwood was conceived by Davies as a ruthless but professional organisation helmed by a "soulless" woman based on someone Davies had met. He originally based the Torchwood seen in the Doctor Who series 2 episodes "Army of Ghosts" and "Doomsday" (both aired 2006) over a rift in Cardiff introduced in "The Unquiet Dead" (2005), but while developing the Torchwood spin-off series over the summer of 2005, he relocated the Torchwood seen in "Army of Ghosts" and "Doomsday" to London, while maintaining the existence of a Cardiff branch for the Torchwood series he was preparing.

== Fictional history ==
=== 1879–2006 ===
The institute was founded by Queen Victoria in 1879, following the events of the Doctor Who episode "Tooth and Claw". While staying at Torchwood House, the Scottish estate of Sir Robert MacLeish, the Queen (Pauline Collins) was attacked by a werewolf, in reality an alien intelligence that planned to infect her with its consciousness by biting her. The werewolf was ultimately dispatched, thanks to the efforts of the Tenth Doctor (David Tennant) and the sacrifice of Sir Robert.

Having discovered that "Great Britain had enemies beyond imagination," Victoria decided to establish the Torchwood Institute in memory of Sir Robert (who lived on the Torchwood Estate). She also decided that the Doctor was a potential threat and declared that if he ever returned (against her orders never to return), Torchwood would be waiting. The Doctor's name was written into the Torchwood Foundation's charter as an enemy of the Crown. Her Majesty states in the Torchwood Charter 31 December 1879 that "Torchwood is also to administer to the Government thereof in our name, and generally to act in our name and on our behalf, subject to such orders and regulations as Torchwood shall, from time to time, receive from us through one of our Principal Secretaries of State". In 1882, Victoria expanded Torchwood's role to include the acquisition of alien technology, creating the policy that "if it's alien, it's ours". In 1888, Victoria reiterated the secrecy policy of the Torchwood Institute, protecting her subjects from the "evils that [Torchwood] fight[s]". Not long after the foundation of the institute, a spacetime rift was identified in Cardiff, and, as a result, a smaller branch of the institute (Torchwood Three) was formed there to monitor and exploit the Rift.

Torchwood Cardiff agents Alice Guppy and Emily Holroyd in 1899

As shown in the episode "Fragments", Jack Harkness (John Barrowman) came to the attention of Torchwood Three in 1899, due to visiting the rift and talking about the Doctor. He was coerced into working for the organisation. Captured by two Torchwood agents—Alice Guppy (Amy Manson) and Emily Holroyd (Heather Craney)–Jack was subjected to torture and interrogation regarding the Doctor before being put to work for the Institute as a freelance agent for over a century. A few years later (1901), whilst this Harkness was in Torchwood's employ, Guppy and Charles Gaskell (Cornelius Macarthy) found and disinterred another Harkness on a different timeline, who instructs them to immediately "cryofreeze" and store him for 107 years to avoid him meeting his other self – they comply with his request.

Old Torchwood logo

The activities of the Torchwood Institute during the 20th century are, for the most part, yet to be revealed. It is known that the organisation "flourished down the decades, becoming stronger" and grew "more arrogant." Some insights into the World War I-era organisation (such as their progressive policies regarding women's civil rights) were offered in Torchwood episode "To the Last Man". Torchwood Three's progressive stance is also shown in the episode "Exit Wounds", where a black Torchwood member called Charles Gaskell is shown in 1901, an era of widespread racial prejudice.

Other events in the 20th century have attributable dates. At the time of the British Raj, Torchwood also maintained a branch in Delhi. This was shut down in 1924, Torchwood anticipating Indian independence; agent Jack Harkness was sent to recover all their artifacts. In 1965, agent Jack Harkness was elected on behalf of the institute (along with representatives of different government agencies) to facilitate the sacrifice of twelve children to aliens known as the 456 to save the planet at large. In 1983, Torchwood became the sole proprietor of H. C. Clements, a security firm. Torchwood One owned a holding facility which was then abandoned in 1995. In 1996 a "Jathaa sunglider" flew into British airspace and was shot down by Torchwood. From its remains, an energy weapon was installed in London and later onto the UNIT aircraft carrier Valiant. On New Year's Eve 1999, the then-leader of Torchwood Three (named "Alex Hopkins" by the Torchwood website) killed all the staff apart from Jack, ending with himself. He claimed that he was "saving" them, as the 21st century was when it all changed and humanity was not ready. Left in charge of Torchwood Three, Jack began severing the links with Torchwood One and their more aggressive policy on extraterrestrial life. Over the next few years, Jack recruited his own team; Suzie Costello (Indira Varma), Toshiko Sato (Naoko Mori) and Dr. Owen Harper (Burn Gorman).

By 2006, the existence of Torchwood was apparently a secret known only to the British military and police. Knowledge of Torchwood was supposedly kept even from Prime Minister Harriet Jones (Penelope Wilton) and the UN. However, Jones did know about its existence anyway, and ordered Major Richard Blake (Chu Omambala) of UNIT to prepare Torchwood for the impending arrival of the Sycorax on Christmas Day. On the command of Prime Minister Harriet Jones, Torchwood used the Jathaa sunglider weapon to destroy a Sycorax ship on Christmas Day 2006.

=== 2007–2012 ===
The Doctor discovered the existence of Torchwood in the 2006 series' two-part finale, "Army of Ghosts" and "Doomsday" set in 2007. At this time, Torchwood operated software which blocked access to Internet searches about UFO activity ("School Reunion"). The TARDISODE for "Army of Ghosts" showed Torchwood agents abducting a journalist who was investigating the Institute and arranging to admit him to a psychiatric institution.

While investigating the manifestation of "ghosts" on Earth, the Doctor traced their origin back to Torchwood Tower, known publicly as One Canada Square, where Yvonne Hartman (Tracy-Ann Oberman) placed the Doctor in custody and confiscated the TARDIS. To Torchwood, the Doctor was a source of vast information and familiarity with alien technology, which they could exploit to further the organisation's aims.

The interior of the Torchwood Tower, as seen in "Army of Ghosts"

Torchwood Tower had been built to reach a spatial breach 660 feet above sea level. Unbeknownst to Torchwood, the breach had been caused by the entrance into the universe of a "void ship", a vessel designed to travel through the void between parallel universes. Torchwood had been conducting experiments on the breach, in an attempt to harness its energy and reduce Britain's reliance on Middle Eastern oil, but these experiments had caused the breach to widen. The "ghosts" turned out to be Cybermen from an alternate universe, which were using the widening breach to travel between universes. A small advance force of Cybermen infiltrated Torchwood, "upgrading" or subverting Torchwood personnel, before eventually seizing control and opening the breach wide enough for ghost-like creatures around the world to manifest fully as millions of Cybermen.

However, the void ship had nothing to do with the Cybermen and had in fact been created by the Daleks (voiced by Nicholas Briggs), four of whom had used it to escape the Time War. Caught between warring Daleks and Cybermen, many Torchwood workers were either killed or "upgraded" to Cybermen (including Hartman herself—although she retained some semblance of her identity). In the wake of these events, referred to as the "Battle of Canary Wharf", the Institute feels it must "learn by heart" a lesson about its own arrogance. It was later revealed that the London branch of Torchwood, called Torchwood One, lost 796 members of staff and was ultimately ordered to close by Queen Elizabeth II. The threat is ended when the Doctor and Rose Tyler use Torchwood One's equipment to banish the Daleks and Cybermen into the Void between worlds and end the invasion.

In "The Runaway Bride", it is revealed that the London-based security firm "H. C. Clements" (which employed secretary Donna Noble (Catherine Tate), who inexplicably materialised in the TARDIS just as she was about to get married) was a front company for the Torchwood Institute. On a restricted basement level of the company situated beneath the Thames Barrier was a secret laboratory which the Institute used to recreate ancient "Huon particles". Over a period of months, H. C. Clements' Human Resources Manager, Lance Bennett (Don Gilet), had courted and poisoned Donna with Huon particles, intending to sacrifice her to the Empress of the Racnoss (Sarah Parish). It would appear that Lance was not acting on behalf of the institute, and the lab was in disuse since the Battle of Canary Wharf and the Queen's official closure of Torchwood One.

In 2007, following Torchwood One's closure, Torchwood Three leader Captain Jack Harkness allows former Torchwood One researcher Ianto Jones (Gareth David-Lloyd) to join his team and is no longer working under the authority of the headquarters in London; he is the de facto leader of the entire organisation. This team worked together until later the same year, when the hiring of policewoman Gwen Cooper (Eve Myles) coincided with the suicide of second-in-command Suzie Costello.

In "The Sound of Drums", Jack indicates to the Doctor that, with Torchwood One gone, fewer than ten staff remain (between Wales and Scotland). He mentions that he rebuilt the Institute "in the Doctor's honour", with a new regime and a less aggressive stance. Outside the institute's small workforce, journalists such as Vivien Rook (Nichola McAuliffe) of The Sunday Mirror investigate controversial figures such as Harold Saxon (John Simm) on behalf of the institute. Saxon sent Torchwood Three on a 'wild goose chase' to the Himalayas to prevent them from helping Jack or the Doctor.

Torchwood Three later fought against the Daleks in their second invasion of Earth. Torchwood used the rift to make contact with the Doctor. Although they were incapacitated in the main battle, thanks to a time lock created by Tosh some time earlier that prevented them from escaping the Hub, Torchwood Three made a contribution to the Earth's return to the Solar System by putting a lasso of temporal energy around the Earth with the help of K-9 (voiced by John Leeson) and Mr Smith (voiced by Alexander Armstrong), allowing the planet to be towed by the TARDIS.

Sometime prior to the 456 incident, Torchwood Two had closed down. Torchwood Three was the only force on Earth posed to combat the threat of the 456 invasion. However, Home Office Permanent Secretary John Frobisher (Peter Capaldi) ordered the assassination of remaining Torchwood agents Harkness, Cooper and Jones to cover up the UK's history with the aliens. On receiving communication from the 456, the government orders the assassination of all Torchwood Three staff to stop them interfering with the operation. While they evade assassination, Jones dies in the line of duty, and Harkness abandons the planet after having to kill his grandson. According to Joshua Naismith (David Harewood) in "The End of Time", the institute is no longer functional in December 2009. For a time, Torchwood is nothing more than a legend; Harkness and Cooper essentially re-establish the institute with some Central Intelligence Agency agents in Torchwood: Miracle Day (2011), although new member Rex Matheson notes at one point that 'Torchwood' is essentially just a name given their current renegade status.

In the Doctor Who episode "Fear Her", set in 2012, Torchwood is public enough to be mentioned in a television broadcast during the London 2012 Olympics.

=== The future ===
In the future seen in the novel Twilight Streets, Torchwood is no longer a private organisation and has branches all across the Torchwood Empire. At the center of the organisation's new image is the Cardiff branch, a new building in the center of the city. The Rift Manipulator has been moved to the new building and has been plugged into a permanently comatose Jack Harkness, whose immortality allows the Rift to be held open safely, thus allowing two-way travel. The radio drama "Asylum" also suggests that Torchwood might gain control over the Rift in the near future, using it to send a half-alien girl back to the present day. Torchwood was also mentioned in the Doctor Who episode "Bad Wolf" when Rose is forced to play on a game show and one of the questions is about the remains of a Torchwood location.

In the 42nd century, the Torchwood Archives sent a group of explorers to investigate a mysterious power source that kept a planet in stable orbit around a black hole. By the 2002nd century, the Great Cobalt Pyramid has been built on the ruins of the Torchwood Institute.

=== Parallel universe ===
In "Rise of the Cybermen", a parallel Earth Torchwood Institute is referred to. It is public enough for a survey carried out by it to be reported in a news item, and for someone to be publicly asked about their work there. Prior to "Army of Ghosts", a group led by Pete Tyler (and including Jake Simmonds and Mickey Smith), which worked for the alternate world's People's Republic, took over the parallel Earth Torchwood. The people of this alternate universe discovered what was going on at Torchwood and it became a re-developed organisation run in full view of the public.

In "Doomsday", it is revealed that the parallel Earth Torchwood had also been conducting experiments on the spatial breach, which led (between "The Age of Steel" and "Army of Ghosts") to it being infiltrated by the Cybermen, who used the breach to travel to Rose's universe. Following the events of "Doomsday", Rose Tyler, confined to the alternate world, goes on to work for the reformed organisation. From this accelerated parallel universe, Rose's Torchwood becomes aware of "the darkness" causing the stars to go out, mentioned in the episode "Journey's End", and returns in "Turn Left" and "The Stolen Earth" to defend London and find the Doctor in his reality. She is followed shortly by Mickey and Jackie, armed with Torchwood-developed anti-Dalek weaponry, in "Journey's End".

== Divisions of Torchwood ==
=== Torchwood One, London ===
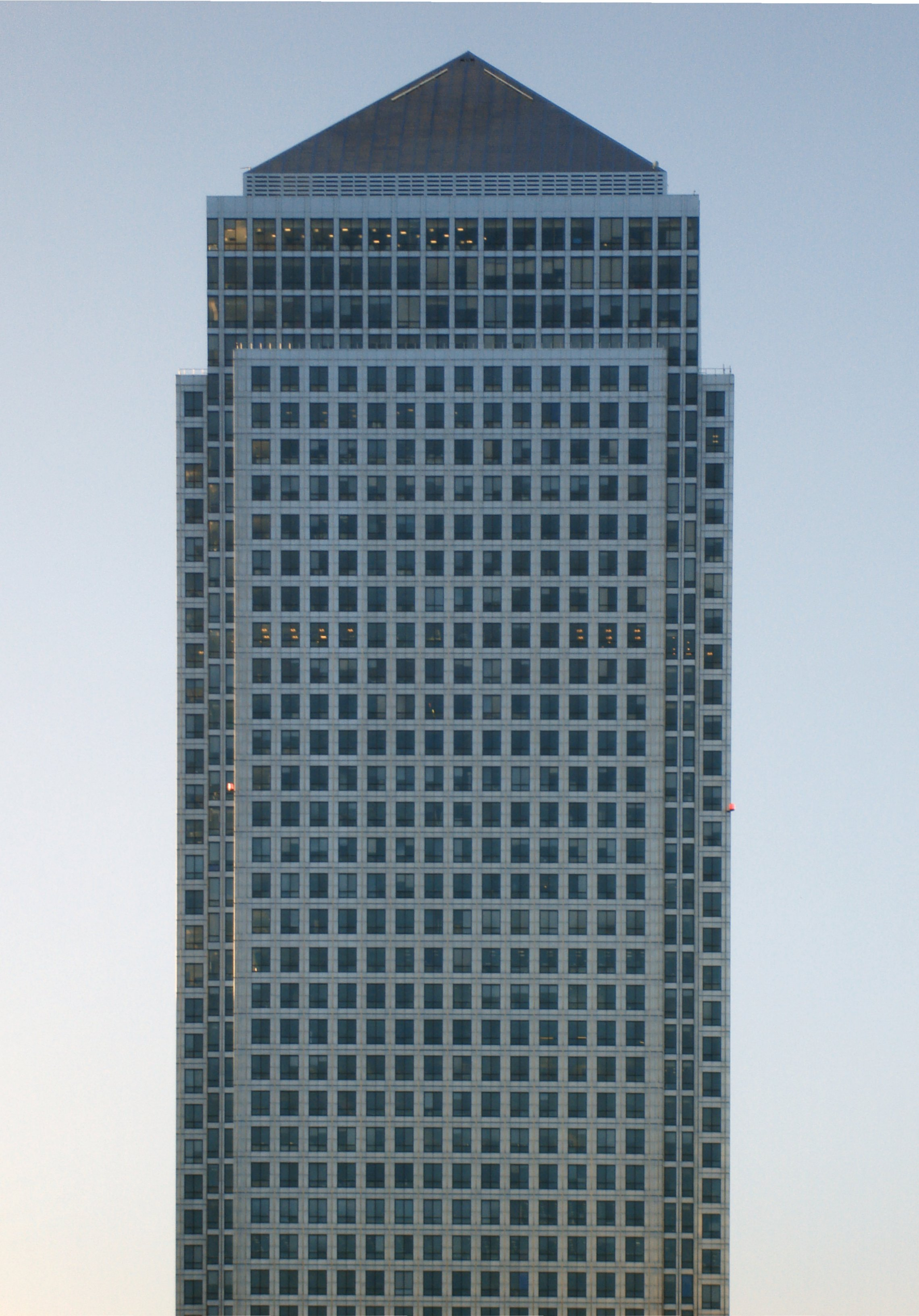
One Canada Square, the hidden location of Torchwood One

Torchwood One was Torchwood's head office and operated out of Torchwood Tower, located within One Canada Square, the tallest of the three Canary Wharf skyscrapers, although it carried out operations across London, including beneath the Thames Barrier, and through front organisations such as "H. C. Clements". To those that have come in contact with Torchwood, they are primarily believed to be a special forces team. The beam which destroyed the Sycorax ship was fired from five different locations around London, suggesting a number of properties are owned by Torchwood One in the area. The tower installations were destroyed during the events of "Doomsday". According to the Torchwood website, there were 823 members of staff, of which only 27 were known to have survived. In the wake of the "Battle of Canary Wharf", Her Majesty ordered the immediate closure of Torchwood One. Some of the notable employees included:

- Yvonne Hartman (director)
- Dr. Rajesh Singh (scientist)
- "Samuel" (Mickey Smith) (scientist)*
- Lisa Hallett
- Adeola Oshodi (scientist)
- Ianto Jones (junior researcher)

=== Torchwood Two, Glasgow ===
All that is known about the Glasgow division of the Torchwood Institute is that it is an office run by a "very strange man". In the novel The Twilight Streets (set in February 2008), Jack contacts the "very strange man" whose name is revealed as Archie, and Torchwood Two's headquarters are near the River Clyde. As with all spin-off media, the canonicity of this remains unclear. An e-mail shown in part two of Children of Earth (set in September 2009) suggests that Torchwood Two disbanded some time before the events of the first encounter with the 456, and that Torchwood Three is the only branch remaining.

=== Torchwood Three, Cardiff ===
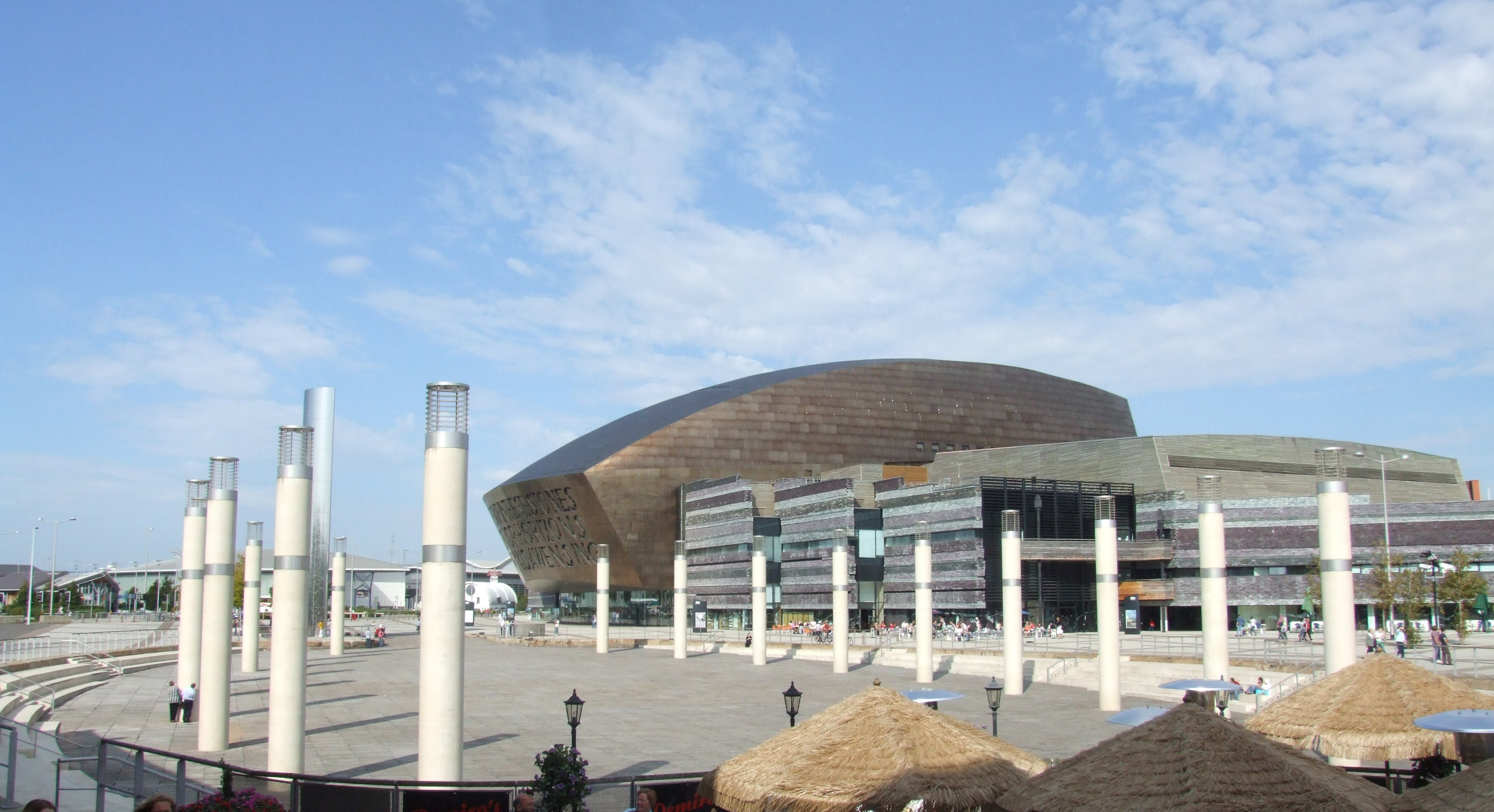
Roald Dahl Plass, the exterior of Torchwood Three

Torchwood Three, whose base is also known as the Torchwood Hub, primarily serves as a monitoring station for a rift in time and space that runs through Cardiff. The job of Torchwood Three is to monitor the rift and control and seize what comes through it. Whereas the London branch is originally staffed by hundreds of individuals, the Cardiff branch is considerably smaller and employs only a small team of experts, hired by Captain Jack and is described as a "renegade outpost". It is located beneath Roald Dahl Plass, and may be entered via an "invisible lift" in the Plass, which can't be seen because of the perception filter that resides on that spot, or through a run-down Tourist Information Centre nearby. Torchwood Three is the setting of the eponymous Torchwood series. It is said by Jack Harkness that the Cardiff Branch has nothing to do with London and that all links were severed. In Torchwood: Children of Earth (2009), Torchwood became a fugitive organisation, the Hub was destroyed, Ianto died, and Jack abandoned Earth, leaving pregnant Gwen the only remaining Torchwood agent left. Doctor Who two-parter "The End of Time" refers to the Institute as no longer existing. Torchwood: Miracle Day (2011) shows that Gwen similarly left Torchwood Three behind after the events of Children of Earth. The Central Intelligence Agency believes all individuals previously affiliated with Torchwood to be dead.

Some notable employees include:

- Captain Jack Harkness (leader, alive (immortal))
- Gwen Cooper (police liaison, alive)
- Dr Owen Harper (medical officer, deceased)
- Toshiko Sato (computer specialist, deceased)
- Ianto Jones (administrator/general support, deceased)
- Suzie Costello (weapons specialist, deceased)
- Dr Martha Jones (UNIT liaison/medical officer, alive)

Whilst the Institute officially disbanded after the events of Children of Earth, Jack and Gwen work with several individuals from the United States to solve the Miracle Day phenomenon. CIA operative Rex Matheson and analyst Esther Drummond join the operation in "Rendition", but Esther dies in "The Blood Line", and Rex gets shot, only to discover that he is immortal, like Jack. Surgeon Vera Juarez allies herself to the cause in "The Categories of Life" but is killed off on her first undercover mission.

=== Torchwood Four, location unknown ===
Torchwood Four is described as "missing". It is not specified how this happened or where it may previously have been located before its disappearance. Some evidence suggests it is linked to an energy node on a ley line in north-west Tasmania. Captain Jack stated they would find it some day. In the novel The Twilight Streets, Jack says that in 1941, Torchwood Four was still missing. In the novel Risk Assessment, Torchwood's immortal assessor Agnes Haversham refers to Torchwood Four's disappearance as having been something of a messy business.

=== Torchwood India, Delhi ===
An Indian branch of Torchwood introduced in the radio play "Golden Age". Torchwood India was founded by Queen Victoria to find alien technology in the British Raj. It was led by Eleanor, Duchess of Melrose, who maintained the branch's cover as a gentlemen's club named the Royal Connaught Club. It was closed down by Captain Jack in 1924, when Torchwood realised the Raj was coming to an end, and all their alien equipment was taken to Britain. In 2009 Jack and Torchwood Three trace an alien energy field to the site of Torchwood India, and discover Eleanor and the other Torchwood India agents are using a time store to prevent time passing in the Royal Connaught Club. The store is powered by taking people's potential futures, killing them. Torchwood Three prevent the Duchess's plan to turn the whole planet back to 1924, resulting in the time store overloading. The club members refuse to leave before the building is frozen in time.

== Cultural influence ==
Due to the popularity of Doctor Who and Torchwood, Torchwood has had an influence on popular culture. On the heels of being featured in Torchwood, Cardiff has become one of the most popular tourist destinations in the UK, in particular, the Wales Millennium Centre, with a resident commenting that tourists often jump on the paving slab that was used as the "magic lift" in the series. In January 2008, such was the popularity of Torchwood that being near the "Torchwood Tower" was used in advertising for local property. A January 2009 article comments on the attraction the Torchwood 'Hub' has brought to the Wales Millennium Centre, as Minister for Heritage Alun Ffred Jones announced that resultingly, "the Wales Millennium Centre building itself is now established as a symbol of modern Welsh culture".

=== In popular culture ===
In the Sherlock episode, "The Lying Detective" a card with the Torchwood logo on it can be seen on Sherlock's mantlepiece under a magnifying glass.
