= Tom Price (actor) =

English actor and comedian (born 1980)

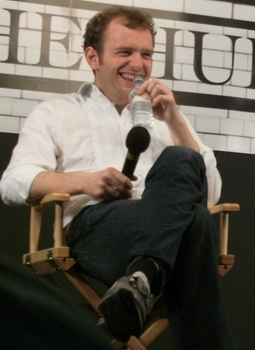
- Tom Price at the 30 January 2012 "The Hub", a Torchwood Convention
- Born: Thomas Price; 12 July 1980 (age 46); Hereford, England
- Occupations: Actor, comedian, radio presenter, voice-over artist
- Spouse: Beth Morrey
- Children: 2

Tom Price (born 12 July 1980) is a Welsh actor, voice-over artist, radio presenter and stand-up comedian originally from Monmouth. He is most noted for portraying Andy Davidson in Torchwood.

== Acting ==
Price's comedy career began in 1998 when he co-starred in a revue at Monmouth School, These Charming Men. He continued acting as a student at the University of Warwick, where he studied English literature. After graduating, he turned down a place at drama school and moved to London. His first TV appearance was playing a waiter in an episode of Absolute Power. He is known to television audiences for being one of the stars of the Five comedy sketch show Swinging. He has also appeared in a recurring role as police officer Andy Davidson in a number of episodes of Torchwood, a spin-off from the long running science fiction series Doctor Who.

In 2008 he starred in the BBC Three sketch show The Wrong Door and filmed the role of Darrin Stephens in a pilot UK remake of Bewitched, which never got aired. Other TV appearances include Doctors (2009) and Secret Diary of a Call Girl (2010). Price also featured in Renault TV's program The Key. In 2011 Price reprised the role of Andy Davidson in Torchwood: Miracle Day, airing on BBC One and US premium television network Starz.

In addition to his TV performances Price has appeared in the films The Boat that Rocked and Hereafter.

In 2011 he appeared in an 8-part comedy reality series called World Series of Dating on BBC3 with Rob Riggle. He was most recently a regular alongside Ruth Jones in Stella and appeared in recent series of Count Arthur Strong and Episodes.

== Comedy ==
Price often performs as a stand-up comedian across the UK and internationally.

He took his debut stand-up show, Say When, to the Edinburgh Festival in 2011, and a reviewer described his comedic style as "easygoing, good-natured autobiographical".

He returned to Edinburgh in 2014 with his show "Not as Nice as He Looks", which was described by one reviewer as "refreshing, innovative and frighteningly funny".

In Autumn 2014, Tom supported Stephen Merchant on his European Tour.

== Radio ==
Price appeared as Gordon, a young drunken doctor, in the BBC Radio 4 comedy show Rigor Mortis for three series, alongside Peter Davison, Geoffrey Whitehead, Matilda Ziegler and, for series one, Tracy-Ann Oberman.

His radio credits also include the Torchwood Radio Play Asylum, in which he reprised his role as Andy.

He hosts the BBC Radio Wales comedy news show "The Leak with Tom Price", which began in September 2014. Prior to that, he regularly hosted the topical comedy radio show What's the Story? on the same station.

In October 2016 Tom became the weekend afternoon host on Magic Radio.

From September 2017, Tom became the weekend breakfast show host on Magic Radio taking over from Harriet Scott until 7 October 2023. From 9 October 2023, Tom can now be heard presenting the 4 till 7 show with Kat Shoob, the show is called "The 4 till 7 show with Tom & Kat"

== Other work ==
Price was also one of the presenters of BBC3's Destination Three. He also presented Senseless on MTV. In 2014 he narrated the ITV1 documentary "Quads". In advertising he has appeared in Velvet Triple Soft and Trident "Mastication for the Nation" adverts, and has been the voice of Nescafe. He has performed in a Virgin Atlantic advert and appeared in jingles on the comedy podcast Answer Me This!. He has also played the part of the PG Tips' Monkey. He has also reprised his role as Andy Davidson in a number of Torchwood audio stories produced by Big Finish Productions.

Price is the creator and host of the podcast My Mate Bought a Toaster, in which he discusses a celebrity guest's Amazon purchase history. The podcast began in April 2019 and guests have included Mel Giedroyc, Jason Manford, Alex Horne, Shappi Khorsandi, Dom Joly, Susannah Constantine, Gabby Logan, Miquita Oliver, Tim Key, Reverend Richard Coles and Cariad Lloyd.

Since the start of the COVID-19 lockdowns in the UK, Price has hosted the podcast Cabin Fever alongside Dave Cribb and Helen Monks. Originally released five times a week, it later changed to weekly episodes.

== Filmography ==
=== Film ===
Year	Title	Role	Notes
2007	Living with Two People You Like Individually... But Not as a Couple	Craig	Television film
2007	The Scum Also Rises	Billy	Television film
2009	The Boat That Rocked	-	Uncredited
2010	Hereafter	Man	
2010	D.O.A.	Luke Chambers	Television film
2010	With or Without U2	Him	Short film
2011	Holy Flying Circus	Tim Rice	Television film
2013	The Search for Simon	Simon Jones (Older)	
2018	Together	Ian Copeland	
2020	The Long Game	Will	Short film

=== Television ===
Year	Title	Role	Notes
2005	Absolute Power	Waiter	Episode: "Spinning America"
2005	Swinging	Various	Recurring role, 6 episodes
2006	Star Stories	-	Episode: "Sadie Frost: My Side of the Story"
2006–2011	Torchwood	Andy Davidson	Recurring role, 14 episodes
2007	Nuclear Secrets	Max Prangnell	Episode: "Vanunu and the Bomb"
2008	The Wrong Door	Various	Recurring role, 4 episodes
2009	Hotel Trubble	Prince Wally	Episode: "Royal Trubble"
2009	Doctors	Richie Dunston	Episode: "Rivals"
2010, 2011	Secret Diary of a Call Girl	Simon	Recurring role, 2 episodes
2011	My Family	Young Couple	Episode: "Germs of Endearment"
2012	World Series of Dating	James Chetwyn-Talbot	Recurring role, 2 episodes
2012	Made in Wales	Maths Teacher	Episode: "Walk or Fly"
2014	Stella	Andy	Recurring role, 5 episodes
2014	Topsy and Tim	Paul	Recurring role, 4 episodes
2015	Episodes	Aaron	Episode: "Series 4, Episode 2"
2015	Count Arthur Strong	Producer	Episode: "Still Life"
2016	The Five	Kenton Marshall	Miniseries; 5 episodes
2016–2017	Victoria	Duke of Sutherland	Recurring role, 4 episodes
2017	Midsomer Murders	Perry Tressel	Episode: "Red in Tooth & Claw"
2017	Bucket	Dom	Episode: "Episode 1"
2018	Animal TV	Simon Truper	Series regular, 13 episodes
2018–2019	Tourist Trap	Jon	Recurring role, 7 episodes
