= Alexa Havins =

American actress (born 1980)

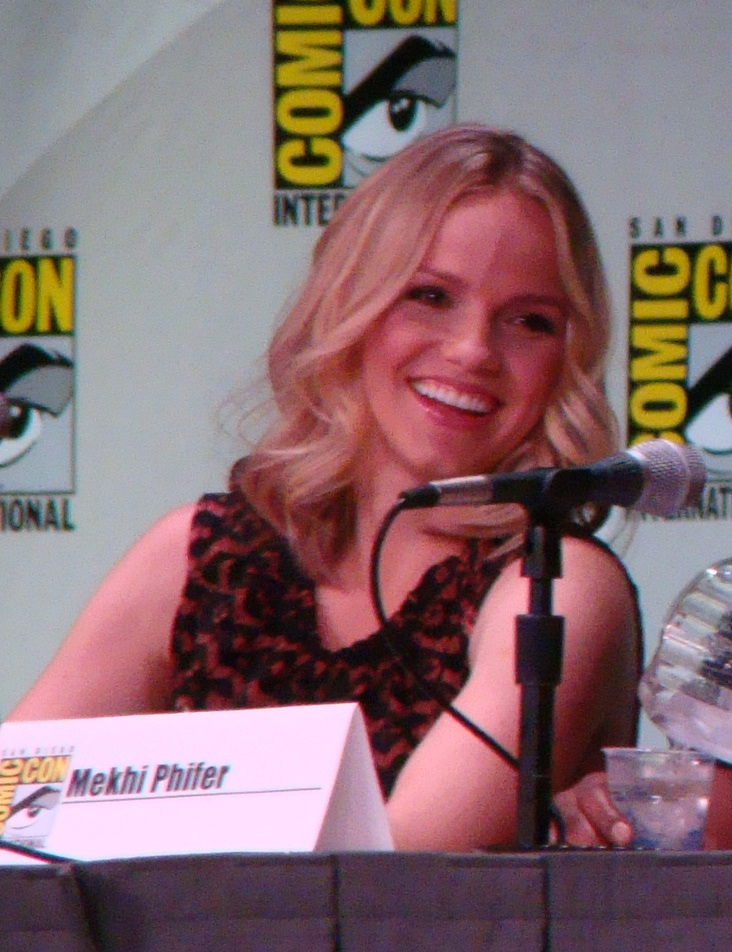
- Havins at San Diego Comic-Con in 2011
- Born: November 16, 1980 (age 45); Artesia, New Mexico, U.S.
- Other name: Alexa Havins Bruening
- Occupation: Actress
- Years active: 2003–present
- Known for: Performance in American soap opera television
- Spouse: Justin Bruening (m. 2005)
- Children: 4

Alexa Havins (born November 16, 1980) is an American actress. She first came to prominence in 2003, when she became the originating actress in the role of Babe Carey Chandler on the soap opera All My Children. Since 2024, she has portrayed the role of Lulu Spencer on General Hospital. Her role as the flawed but good Babe Carey earned her a Daytime Emmy Award nomination in 2005 and recognition as being half of one of the show's most popular soap opera pairings.

Havins has made guest appearances in a number of television shows, as well as a number of independent films. In 2011, she joined the main cast for Torchwood's fourth series, Torchwood: Miracle Day, airing on BBC Worldwide and US premium television network Starz.

== Early life ==
Alexa Havins was born in Artesia, New Mexico, on November 16, 1980. As a child and adolescent, she was raised in Chandler, Arizona, later attending Chandler High School. Coincidentally, her mother often called her Babe. Her childhood nickname was the "Ice Maiden" because she was "deathly shy".

Havins was first introduced to entertainment at age three when she discovered dancing. At the age of five, she was already performing professionally with a jazz ensemble. However, it was not until she was discovered by renowned acting coach Jean Fowler, who encouraged her move to New York City, that she began to turn her talent into a professional career. There, she attended the prestigious Circle in the Square Theatre School, where her love for acting would develop. While in Los Angeles, California, Havins met and studied closely under the legendary acting coach Brian Reise. The two have remained close friends, and he continues to be a mentor to her to this day.

== Career ==
Before her role as Babe Carey Chandler on All My Children, Havins was a professional dancer. She changed her focus to acting, carrying a principle with her: "Always hold on to your morals and values because this business can be very deceiving. I turned down a lot of things because there was nudity required," she said.

During her time on the series, Havins earned a Daytime Emmy nomination for Outstanding Younger Actress in a Drama Series and a Soap Opera Digest Award for Outstanding Younger Lead Actress. In a baby switch storyline set into motion by two shows, All My Children and One Life to Live, she portrayed the character on One Life to Live as well.

Other acting compliments include her character's romantic pairing with Jacob Young's JR Chandler, often cited for their romantic chemistry. "The on-screen chemistry she shares with Emmy-winning co-star Jacob Young is simply sizzling and truly magnetizing," stated soap opera site Soapcentral. The two actors' dynamic as the pair made their characters well known in the top ten couples lists for one of today's most popular soap opera couples.

While still on contract with All My Children, Havins appeared in films Joe Killionaire, the 2004 horror-comedy by writer-director Sean Morton, Tracy Michele Tabb's 26-minute 2005 romantic comedy First Kiss, Travis Betz's 2006 horror Joshua, and Ash Christian's original off-beat 2006 comedy feature Fat Girls.

In addition, Havins guest-starred in a June 2006 episode of FX's critically praised series Rescue Me, as well as guest-starred on the pilot episode of On and Off, though this series was never aired.

On stage, Havins received credit in a production of Tennessee Williams' The Glass Menagerie, where she portrayed Laura, the painfully shy girl who has a troubled relationship with her aging mother. She also portrayed the lead role of 12-year-old tomboy Frankie Addams, in the stage version of Carson McCullers' 1946 novel The Member of the Wedding. Another project for Havins was the film Brooklyn Rules, a mob drama by Michael Corrente set in 1985 Brooklyn, which had a limited release on May 18, 2007, starring Alec Baldwin, Freddie Prinze, Jr., Mena Suvari and Scott Caan. Havins was later busy with filming in Keith Schwebel's low-budget indie flick titled Desert Fox.

On September 4, 2007, it was confirmed by Soap Opera Digest that Havins would be leaving All My Children and that actress Amanda Baker would be taking over the role. Havins departed the show on October 8, 2007, to pursue other acting ventures.

In 2008, Havins appeared in the film 27 Dresses, starring Katherine Heigl of Grey's Anatomy fame. Havins portrayed a bride. She also appeared in the film Old Dogs.

In 2011, Havins joined John Barrowman, Eve Myles and Mekhi Phifer as part of the main cast for Torchwood's fourth series, Torchwood: Miracle Day, airing on BBC Worldwide and US premium television network Starz. She portrays character Esther Drummond, "an innocent, in a world of assassins, liars and zealots". She also filmed guest spots on CSI: NY and Grey's Anatomy. In July 2011 it was confirmed that Havins would return for several episodes of All My Children to be broadcast later in the year.

In September 2024, it was reported Havins had joined the cast of General Hospital in the role of Lulu Spencer. She made her episodic debut on November 19 of the same year.

== Personal life ==
Havins is good friends with her former on-screen mother Bobbie Eakes. Since June 5, 2005, Havins has been married to her former All My Children co-star Justin Bruening. Bruening, who portrayed Jamie Martin, proposed to Havins following the taping of a scene where the character of Jamie proposes to Babe. After husband Bruening left All My Children, Havins exited as well shortly after and the couple moved to Los Angeles. Together, they have four children: three daughters and one son.

== Filmography ==
Year	Title	Role	Notes
2004	Joe Killionaire	Interviewed Fan	
2004	Bank Brothers	Store owner	Video
2005	First Kiss	Samantha	Short film
2006	Joshua	Trish Unger	
2006	Fat Girls	Tina	
2007	Brooklyn Rules	Blonde	
2008	27 Dresses	Boat Bride	
2008	Hancock	Hot Fan	
2009	How to Seduce Difficult Women	Maureen	
2009	Old Dogs	Hot Waitress 2	
2009	Desert Fox	Daisy	
2010	When in Rome	Lacy	
2011	Serving Justice	Jill Daniels	Short film
2013	Proxy	Melanie Michaels	
2018	Professor Marston and the Wonder Women	Molly Stewart	
2018	Killer Vacation	Lindsey Harrison	

Television performances
Year	Title	Role	Notes
2003	Secret Lives	Georgia Durante	Episode: "Mafia Model"
2003	Reno 911!	Gothic Kid	Episode: "Halloween"
2003–2005	One Life to Live	Babe Carey	Recurring role
2003–2007, 2011	All My Children	Babe Carey	Series regular (2003–2007); Guest star (2011)
2006	Rescue Me	Talker	Episode: "Discovery"
2008–2009	Turbo Dates	Sarah	Main role (8 episodes)
2009	Cold Case	Joannie Pogue (1967)	Episode: "The Brush Man"
2009	Law & Order: Criminal Intent	Elaine Beuliss	Episode: "In Treatment"
2009	CSI: Miami	Kim Hewitt	Episode: "Dude, Where's My Groom?"
2011	CSI: NY	Jessica Thompson	Episode: "Party Down"
2011	Grey's Anatomy	Danielle	Episode: "P.Y.T. (Pretty Young Thing)"
2011	Torchwood	Esther Drummond	Main role (10 episodes)
2012	Castle	Elle Daniels	Episode: "Probable Cause"
2015	Constantine	Linda	Episode: "Angels and Ministers of Grace"
2015	The Astronaut Wives Club	Pat White	Episode: "In the Blind"
2019	Barry	Kate	Episode: "Past = Present x Future Over Yesterday"
2023	Sweet Magnolias	Vicky	Episode: "A Game of Telephone"
2024–present	General Hospital	Lulu Spencer	Series regular

== Awards and nominations ==
List of acting awards and nominations
Year	Award	Category	Title	Result	Ref.
2005	Daytime Emmy Awards	Outstanding Younger Actress in a Drama Series	All My Children	Nominated	
2005	Soap Opera Digest Awards	Outstanding Younger Leading Actress	All My Children	Won	

== See also ==
- JR Chandler and Babe Carey

First	Babe Carey (role); 2003–07; 2011	Succeeded by Amanda Baker
Preceded by Amanda Baker	Babe Carey (role); 2003–07; 2011	None
Preceded by Emme Rylan	Lulu Spencer (role); 2024–present	Incumbent
