= End of the Road (Torchwood) =

2011 Torchwood episode

39 – "End of the Road"
- Torchwood episode

Cast
- Starring: John Barrowman – Captain Jack Harkness; Eve Myles – Gwen Cooper; Mekhi Phifer – Rex Matheson; Alexa Havins – Esther Drummond; Kai Owen – Rhys Williams; Bill Pullman – Oswald Danes
- Others: Lauren Ambrose – Jilly Kitzinger; Candace Brown – Sarah Drummond; Sharon Morgan – Mary Cooper; Marina Benedict – Charlotte Willis; John de Lancie – Allen Shapiro; Wayne Knight – Brian Friedkin; Paul James – Noah Vickers; Teddy Sears – Blue-eyed Man; Nana Visitor – Olivia Colasanto; Megan Duffy – Claire; Constance Wu – Shawnie; David Desantos – Agent Baylor; Nayo K Wallace – Wilson

Production
- Directed by: Gwyneth Horder-Payton
- Written by: Story: Ryan Scott; Teleplay: Ryan Scott & Jane Espenson
- Produced by: Kelly A. Manners
- Executive producers: Russell T Davies; Julie Gardner; Jane Tranter; Jane Espenson (co-executive); Vlad Wolynetz (co-executive)
- Music by: Murray Gold
- Production code: 108
- Series: Miracle Day
- Running time: 55 minutes
- First broadcast: 26 August 2011 (US); 1 September 2011 (UK)

Chronology
← Preceded by "Immortal Sins"	Followed by → "The Gathering"

"End of the Road" is the eighth episode of Torchwood: Miracle Day, the fourth series of the British science fiction television series Torchwood. It was first broadcast in the United States on Starz on 26 August 2011, and in the United Kingdom on BBC One on 1 September 2011.

Torchwood: Miracle Day follows the aftermath of a day where humanity has stopped being able to die. In the episode, a team called Torchwood discovers a conspiracy by three families to use its leader Jack Harkness' (John Barrowman) blood to start the "Miracle" where no humans died. The Torchwood team also attempts to get rid of a piece of powerful alien technology to avoid it getting into the hands of the Central Intelligence Agency.

== Plot summary ==
The Torchwood team arrives at the Colasanto estate led by Olivia Colasanto, Angelo's granddaughter. At the estate, Jack finds Angelo, now an old man and in a coma, having lived that long trying to find out about the secrets of immortality. Olivia reveals that the ones responsible for the Miracle are called "the Families", the three mob bosses who bought Jack when he was captured in 1928 and were able to create the miracle, in some manner related to his blood. Jack explains that his immortality doesn't work like that, but the Miracle is real, and a lot of his blood was taken while he was imprisoned. Angelo initially tried to join the alliance with the Families due to their common goal, but Angelo was rejected because they frowned on his homosexuality.

While Olivia explains this, a CIA team led by Brian Friedkin captures everyone in the mansion. Friedkin is trying to cover up the Families and his treason. Rex explains that he set Friedkin up, so that he could expose him to the CIA at large. Using the I-5 contact lenses, he transmits Friedkin gloating straight onto a monitor in front of their superior, Allen Shapiro. With their names cleared, Jack and Gwen decide to work with the CIA in order to find the whereabouts of the Families, and stop the Miracle. But one of their only leads is destroyed when Friedkin kills himself, along with Olivia, with a suicide bomb.

Jack then takes some time to say goodbye to his former lover, as alarms go off around him announcing that Angelo's just died. In annoyance he turns off the machines, until he realizes that unlike everyone else on the planet, the rules for the miracle do not apply to Angelo either; he has actually died.

In Dallas, Oswald asks Jilly to get him a prostitute on a whim, claiming he wants something normal in this new world. Jilly takes on a new intern, unaware that she is a CIA agent. When the prostitute arrives at Oswald's room, she is surprised to learn that Oswald just wants to have dinner with her. She rejects his offer and tells him that as a celebrity, he is worshipped, but as a man, he's still hated for what he did and soon will become a "Category 0". Oswald demands answers of Jilly, who reveals that there is a new law that is being worked on that will classify criminals like Oswald as Category 0s and send them to the modules. Angered that PhiCorp used him for their plans and intended to abandon him once they were done with him, Oswald batters Jilly and runs away. Later, Jilly is met by a representative of the Families, who shoots the CIA mole. The mole's identity was revealed by another Family agent within the CIA, Charlotte Wills, who happens to be a former teammate of Esther and Rex. After a one-question job interview, he takes Jilly to meet the Families.

Esther gets in contact with her sister, who's currently in a secure mental facility, and finds out to her horror that her sister wants to volunteer herself and her children to become "Category 1". In desperation, Esther ignores Jack's pleading not to reveal a critical detail she noticed about Angelo's room (the floor). After removing the floor panelling, a mysterious device is discovered. After Shapiro orders Gwen to be deported, Jack explains it is a Null Field transmitter, which interferes with the morphic field he previously postulated was behind the Miracle. Although he claims to be broadly unfamiliar with the technology, he is forced to help disable it so it can be taken to CIA Headquarters in Langley.

Jack modifies the Null Field to target sound, so he can converse with Rex and Esther without being overheard. Jack explains the reason for his reticence: he is trying to protect humanity from technology they should not have access to, due to the damage to the timeline. He also explains that the tech is alien, and that it most likely came from the Torchwood Hub. It was buried in the ruins as shown in the third series, but Angelo must have had people salvage the transmitter, preparing for the miracle. It is suggested that Jack is mortal because Angelo used the device to target him as well through his blood. Jack begs Rex and Esther to help him escape, to help save the shining future he's seen. He takes a critical piece of the technology so nobody can replicate it. On the way out, an agent shoots Jack and sees Esther helping. Rex knocks the agent unconscious, and Esther drives a wounded Jack away.

The episode closes with Esther begging Jack to reply, as she drives not knowing where to go. At the same time, Gwen is on the plane leaving the US for the UK.

== Reception ==
The HD Room gave a positive review "Cryptkeeper Angelo did more for the plot progression of the arc in Torchwood: Miracle Day 'End of the Road' than every line that has come out of Rex's mouth up to this point. Jilly's flip out was a long time coming and didn't disappoint and again, the writing is subtle and effective, like watching Ali fight. All in all, 'End of the Road' is another great episode that allowed all the players, even Mekhi Pfifer as Rex, to showcase their skills as actors/actresses. Tons of questions are answered, and tons more presented. The giant ball that is Torchwood: Miracle Day's story arc is now rolling at full speed."

Den of Geek gave a positive review "The beauty of Miracle Day is that there are so many things going on that, if one element isn't working for you, there's something else not far away."

"The three families, though, is just one of the balls that this episode was attempting to juggle, with sizeable success I should add. Esther, played impressively as always by Alexa Havins, is facing the tragedies and difficulties within her own family. If we follow the usual path of Torchwood, that suggests she's got a horrific decision at some point to face, and just two episodes in which to make it. Rex, meanwhile, hints at what's troubling him, in that his days might be numbered the minute the miracle is reversed. Which, presumably, it will be. Will he, and many others, just instantly die? That might make for a haunting final episode? We also get Jilly Kitzinger coming out of the shadows of Oswald Danes, and more importantly, being recruited by the three families. What, exactly, do they want her to do? Whatever it is, lots more Lauren Ambrose in the final two episodes would be very, very welcome. I still think the more focused work in Immortal Sins has provide the highlight of the series to date. But I also liked that End of the Road was so keen to tell so much story. Credit to Star Trek veteran John de Lancie, who eats up every minute of screen time he's allowed. His contribution is a welcome one. And given that few showrunners can put together a momentous penultimate episode to a series as Russell T Davies, I, for one, can't wait for next week…"

In the UK, the episode was watched by 3.5 million viewers, a 15% audience share. Dan Martin states that after weeks on end of the same episode, Miracle Day seems to finally be coming into its own with a tidal wave of answers. Most of the answers are however nonsense but viewers positively embrace it. The series still has two hours left but it finally feels like it's moving on, with Martin hoping that we the audience may see some aliens before long. While the return of Jilly and Oswald sets things up nicely for the conclusion of their story arc.
