= The Gathering (Torchwood) =

2011 Torchwood episode

40 – "The Gathering"
- Torchwood episode

Cast
- Starring: John Barrowman – Captain Jack Harkness; Eve Myles – Gwen Cooper; Mekhi Phifer – Rex Matheson; Alexa Havins – Esther Drummond; Kai Owen – Rhys Williams; Bill Pullman – Oswald Danes
- Others: Lauren Ambrose – Jilly Kitzinger; Candace Brown – Sarah Drummond; Sharon Morgan – Mary Cooper; William Thomas – Geraint Cooper; Marina Benedict – Charlotte Willis; John de Lancie – Allen Shapiro; Russell T Davies - Radio news presenter (uncredited voice); Paul James – Noah Vickers; Teddy Sears – Blue-eyed Man; Frances Fisher – The Mother; Ian Hughes – Finch; Adam Silver – The Young Man; Willis Chung – Chinese Man; Danny Szam – Surveillance Guy; Jesse Wang – Chinese Worker; Gilbert Wayne – Old Man

Production
- Directed by: Guy Ferland
- Written by: John Fay
- Produced by: Kelly A. Manners; Brian Minchin (UK unit)
- Executive producers: Russell T Davies; Julie Gardner; Jane Tranter; Vlad Wolynetz (co-executive)
- Music by: Murray Gold
- Production code: 109
- Series: Miracle Day
- First broadcast: 2 September 2011 (US); 8 September 2011 (UK)

Chronology
← Preceded by "End of the Road"	Followed by → "The Blood Line"

"The Gathering" is the ninth episode of Torchwood: Miracle Day, the fourth series of the British science fiction television series Torchwood. It was first broadcast in the United States on Starz on 2 September 2011.

Torchwood: Miracle Day follows the aftermath of a day where humanity has stopped being able to die. The episode is set two months after the end of "End of the Road". In the episode, a team called Torchwood split into two groups to go to Shanghai and Buenos Aires where the mysterious "Blessing" linked with the "Miracle" where nobody dies exists simultaneously.

== Plot summary ==
Two months have passed since "End of the Road". An economic disaster has affected the world and governments have become more isolationist, and closer to dictatorships, and have started enforcing rationing. Also, the Overflow Camps have remained open despite the full public knowledge of what occurs there.

Esther and Jack are on the run in Scotland. While in Scotland, Esther has been taking blood from Jack since they suspect it is significant to the Miracle, the families, and the Blessing. Jack's own blood bank is stored in a metal briefcase in case it becomes useful. Eventually when Oswald Danes travels to Gwen Cooper's home in Swansea with information about a man behind the Miracle, the team reconvene in the Cooper residence.

Torchwood discover that Jilly Kitzinger was hired by PhiCorp to mistranslate foreign news clips into English, including one of a man in Shanghai saying he was saved by the Blessing.

Esther notes blood banks were burnt down shortly before the Miracle in two of the most populous cities in the world: Shanghai and Buenos Aires. Rhys, examining a globe, realizes that they are the exact opposite points on the Earth.

Meanwhile, police authorities under reinstated Category legislation have the authority to enter homes if residents are under suspicion of harboring Category Ones. Considered legally dead, any Category Ones are taken into custody and held until such a time that they can be incinerated in the ovens. Gwen's father has been hidden behind some wood paneling in the basement. When an inspector returns a second time with a new thermal imaging application on his smartphone, he removes Gwen's father. Gwen begs them to leave him alone, but nothing can be done. She reminds Jack and the others that all she wants is to stop the Miracle and have this authoritarian disaster end.

Rhys' discovery of two geographic points running across the center of the Earth reflects the logo of PhiCorp - a circle with a line running through it. They decide to split up and investigate: Rex and Esther travel to Buenos Aires; Jack, Gwen, and Oswald (who knows too much information to be released and who is at risk of being murdered by Rhys if he stays in the Cooper residence) are smuggled by gun runners into Shanghai. As Jack puts it, Torchwood has now gone global. When Charlotte notices that Rex has touched down in Argentina, she immediately informs the Families.

Meanwhile, Jilly Kitzinger is given an entirely new identity by the Families as "Lucy Statten Meredith", effectively ceasing to exist under her former identity, and is promoted to a position in Shanghai. Meeting an unidentified member of the Families, she is complimented on her storytelling skills and informed that she was hired to essentially write world history for the Families. She is taken to the Blessing, which is revealed to be a massive crack or fissure running through the centre of the planet Earth, one that pulls the surrounding debris into itself.

In Shanghai, Gwen discovers that Jack has not recovered from his gunshot wound and is, in fact, faring worse after traveling. Undressing the bandages, Gwen assesses his wound and a drop of blood falls to the floor of the apartment they are staying in. Oswald brings to their attention that it travels across the floor, as if magnetized by an invisible force, and Gwen speculates Jack's blood is being drawn to the Blessing - Jack is connected to the phenomenon of the Blessing.

== Reception ==
The Independent gave a positive review saying, "'The Gathering' was fantastic. It was exciting and it felt as if the story was going somewhere. At times there was an element of information overload with Rex and the CIA following up leads. Yet it was engaging with subtle satire threaded in, there were mentions of the economic turmoil caused by the Miracle which parallel the turbulent state of our own economy. It was nice to see Torchwood return to the UK temporarily with a reunion in Gwen’s kitchen in Swansea. And it will be interesting to see how a future series of Torchwood will justify the constant shift between Europe and America. 'The Gathering' felt like it had been given a shot of adrenaline with the pace picking up and the plotlines beginning to intersect."

Chud.com gave a positive review saying Pullman has been great as Danes throughout "Miracle Day" and episode writer John Fay managed to keep the episode interesting.

The Guardian's Dan Martin states that the pretitle sequence "recalls some of the funny, quirky Welshness from the old days" whilst the story arc of Gwen losing her Dad is "genuinely heartbreaking." Martin was ecstatic that the series finally showed an alien.
