= Jilly Kitzinger =

- Torchwood character
- First appearance: "Rendition" (2011)
- Last appearance: "The Blood Line" (2011)
- Portrayed by: Lauren Ambrose

In-universe information
- Alias: Lucy Statten Meredith
- Affiliation: PhiCorp; The Three Families; Blue-eyed Man
- Home era: Early 21st century

Jilly Kitzinger is a fictional character in the BBC television programme Torchwood, a spin-off from the long-running series Doctor Who, portrayed by American actress Lauren Ambrose. The character was promoted as one of five new main characters to join Torchwood in its fourth series, Torchwood: Miracle Day (2011), as part of a new co-production between Torchwood's British network, BBC One, and its American financiers on US premium television network Starz. Ambrose appears in seven of the ten episodes, and is credited as a "special guest star" throughout. Whilst reaction to the series was mixed, Ambrose's portrayal was often singled out by critics for particular praise and in 2012 she received a Saturn Award nomination for Best Supporting Actress on Television.

Miracle Day depicts the effects of an event which halts the process of death worldwide. Jilly Kitzinger is a public relations expert who sees this phenomenon, labelled "Miracle Day" by the media, as an opportunity she can use to further her career. Early in the series she becomes a representative for the paedophile-murderer Oswald Danes (Bill Pullman) which gains both parties publicity; however Kitzinger has little personal sympathy with her client and abandons him when she no longer needs him. Towards the end of the series she affiliates herself with 'the Families', the main villains behind the supernatural event of 'Miracle Day' and her own personal view of the world becomes apparent. Though those she works for are defeated in the series finale, it is revealed that Jilly has survived, leaving the character's future uncertain.

The character is used by the production team to provide commentary on mass-media; she is ostensibly first and foremost concerned with profiting from global events. Jilly is also used as a foil to the contemptible Oswald Danes; during the series each uses the other for their own ends. Whilst she was promoted as having a "heart of stone" and described by critics as a "bad-girl" and "amoral", Ambrose stated that the character also had positive characteristics. Series writer Jane Espenson felt the character to be partly defined by her "ego" and "self-delusion".

== Appearances ==
Jilly first appears in the second episode of Miracle Day where she offers the controversial Oswald Danes (Bill Pullman), a recently released convicted child murderer and paedophile, representation. Danes agrees to be represented by her after being assaulted by vigilante police officers; with him assured as a client Jilly sets out to sell his celebrity status in addition to the public image of drug company Phicorp and "Miracle Day" itself. Kitzinger also approaches the respected Washington DC surgeon Vera Juarez (Arlene Tur), but she allies herself with Torchwood—a group of renegades composed of two former alien-hunters and two former CIA agents—and distracts Jilly from an infiltration by Gwen Cooper (Eve Myles). In spite of her professional remit Jilly expresses disgust at Oswald in "Escape to L.A." when his public persona is eclipsed by Ellis Hartley Monroe (Mare Winningham), stating that she cannot look at his hands after the crime he has committed. When a publicity stunt ensures that Danes starts trending on social networking site Twitter "like never before" her enthusiasm is restored. Whilst backstage at the Miracle Day rally at which Danes is speaking she is told by a mysterious blue-eyed man (Teddy Sears) that she has started to become noticed by "the right people" through her role as Danes' publicist.

"End of the Road" sees the tension between Kitzinger and Danes reach a climax; when Danes learns that he has been made "Category Zero" – someone due to be incinerated for moral reasons under emergency legislation – Kitzinger reveals cold-heartedly that she knew about these plans, and Oswald's moment of fame had changed nothing for him. After Danes and Kitzinger part ways the blue-eyed man returns and offers Kitzinger a promotion. At the climax of "The Gathering" she meets The Mother (Frances Fisher), the Shanghai representative of the Families, who introduces her to the Blessing, an antipodal geological formation which is said to show an individual the contents of their soul. When asked what the Blessing reveals to her Jilly appears unfazed, replying "That I'm right." She is present for a final philosophical stand-off between Torchwood – represented by Jack Harkness (John Barrowman) and Gwen Cooper – and the Families and throws her allegiance behind the Families' plan for world power, responding to a moral appeal by Cooper by declaring that she considers all altruism to be fraudulent. After Torchwood end the Miracle and Oswald blows up the Shanghai facility, Kitzinger escapes alive. Some time later she meets the blue-eyed representative of the Families, who informs her that their work is not yet done.

== Casting and characterisation ==
Lauren Ambrose's casting was announced on 13 January 2011, with her character Jilly Kitzinger initially being billed as "a sweet-talking PR genius with a heart of stone who's just cornered the most important client of her career ... and maybe of all time". Jilly is involved in the commercial side of Miracle Day, and provides commentary on how global events are often "spun for profit". Show creator Russell T Davies approached Ambrose directly about starring in the series, which marked her first role in a science-fiction production. The actress recalls that his discussion with her regarding the series helped her to decide to take the role, remarking that she was "really inspired by his words and by his care for every detail of the story." The actress later said in an interview with New York Magazine that another reason she was attracted to the part of Jilly was that it was completely different from any role she'd played previously. Whilst filming the series Ambrose worked closely with American film actor Bill Pullman, who played Oswald. Pullman states that he was already aware of Ambrose through her accomplishments as a stage actress but "came away from the series even more impressed with her." Speaking of her character's relationship with Oswald Danes, Ambrose observes that they have a contentious relationship, but need each other.

Prior to the casting of the role, the writers had already established several details relating to the character of Jilly with series writer Jane Espenson stating that "the high heels, the attitude, and the name were there from the beginning". Speaking of how the character's clothing formed part of her identity, Ambrose praised costume designer Shawna Trpcic, noting that everything co-ordinated well and that "each costume for me is more beautiful than the next" leading her to suppose that "Jilly Kitzinger spends her money well". The BBC's Torchwood website, which was re-vamped shortly prior to the broadcast of series four, draws attention to Jilly's ruthless and manipulative qualities stating that she understands "how the world spins and instinctively knows how to manipulate her position in it". A promotional character video released by Starz on 9 June 2011 highlighted these character traits; in it the character of Jilly states she would do whatever it takes to sell 'Miracle Day', including "making a bargain with the devil himself". Reporting on the video TV.com's Tim Surette described the character as a "bad-girl" and a "hard-ass", noting a transformation in Ambrose from previous "sweet-girl" characters she had portrayed. Despite her character's ruthless ambition Ambrose feels that Jilly is more than a one dimensional villain and still possesses a soul, explaining that the character has "a lot of good qualities [and] she's just doing her job." In an interview which BBC Online she enumerated on her character's positive aspects, describing her as "business-minded", "fierce" and "shrewd".

Jane Espenson described Jilly as a "scene-stealer who uses her klutziness to both draw attention to herself and divert attention from her agenda". Though Oswald believes that Jilly was his assistant, Espenson feels that she acted more as his keeper; The Guardian's Dan Martin notes that the character of Oswald is played for laughs against Ambrose's "high heeled career bitch". Russell T Davies provided Jilly's response to the Blessing in "The Gathering", where she looks into the crevasse and finds conviction. When asked about this scene, Espenson commented that she felt this sequence gave insight into Jilly's "self-delusion" and "the ego of someone who can look into the void and walk out of it with confidence", though added the caveat that "I think the line is meant to hang there, unexplained and fantastically question-raising." In the final episode of the fourth series, Jilly's own political views are demonstrated as she launches a morally nihilistic attack on the hypocrisies of modern society; in light of this rant Martin describes her as "the only woman who can make a Guardianista flirt with the right wing through lipstick and compassion alone."

== Reception ==
Reaction to the character was largely positive; even as reviews of the fourth series became increasingly mixed. Rob Owen writing for the Cape Cod Times described her as "a smiling shark... played with scheming glee" whilst Kevin Fitzpatrick, of UGO Networks labelled Kitzinger as "our favorite fiery redhead". Meredith Jacobs, previewing "The Categories of Life" for Gather.com stated that "Lauren Ambrose has excelled as Jilly Kitzinger on Torchwood: Miracle Day, and so far has shown that she was the right choice for the role"; in a review of the episode Ivey West from Clique Clack TV also praised Ambrose's performance, remarking she "brings this giddiness to the character that is incredibly refreshing". Dan Martin, weighing up the first eight episodes for The Guardian felt that the character was one of the highlights of the series stating that "Lauren Ambrose's daffy, deliciously amoral Jilly Kitzinger owns every scene she's in."

io9's Charlie Jane Anders described the scene where Jilly looks into the heart of 'the Blessing' as excellent, noting that it posited her as a character without compunction. In her review of "The Blood Line" Anders praised "Jilly Kitzinger's final embrace of villainy", believing this to be a great evolution of the character and something that she wished the audience had seen more of. In his review of the series finale Los Angeles Times correspondent Emily VanDerWerff singled out Jilly as the "only new character worth writing home about" attributing this to her "delightfully evil" character and Ambrose's portrayal. In a retrospective of the successes and failures of the fourth series, Digital Spy's Morgan Jeffrey notes that Lauren Ambrose was "superb" stating that "in the early episodes of Miracle Day especially, she brought a sense of fun to proceedings that was absolutely vital." Jeffrey was glad the character survived the conclusion to the series, believing her to have untapped potential.

For her performance as Kitzinger, Ambrose has received a Saturn Award nomination for Best Supporting Actress in Television at the 38th Annual Saturn Awards, held on 20 June 2012.
