= The Middle Men =

2011 Torchwood episode

37 – "The Middle Men"
- Torchwood episode

Cast
- Starring: John Barrowman – Captain Jack Harkness; Eve Myles – Gwen Cooper; Mekhi Phifer – Rex Matheson; Alexa Havins – Esther Drummond; Kai Owen – Rhys Williams
- Others: William Thomas – Geraint Cooper; Ernie Hudson – Stuart Owens; Fred Koehler – Ralph Coltrane; Marc Vann – Colin Maloney; Jason Brooks – Press Secretary; Ciera Payton – Janet; Jonathan Spencer – Tony; Eric Steinberg – Zheng Yibao; Alexis Delarosa – Young Guard; Brittnee Garza – Worker; Brendan Hughes – Pidgeon; Liz Jenkins – Rachel; Lena Kaur – Dr. Alicia Patel; Janice Kent – Female Psychiatrist; Isaac Stephen Montgomery – Stern Soldier; William Patrick Riley – Hat Check Boy; Marty Ryan – Older Guard; Inger Tudor – Mrs. Owens

Production
- Directed by: Guy Ferland
- Written by: John Shiban
- Produced by: Kelly A. Manners; Brian Minchin (UK unit)
- Executive producers: Russell T Davies; Julie Gardner; Jane Tranter; John Shiban (co-executive); Vlad Wolynetz (co-executive)
- Music by: Murray Gold
- Production code: 106
- Series: Miracle Day
- Running time: 55 minutes
- First broadcast: 12 August 2011 (US); 18 August 2011 (UK)

Chronology
← Preceded by "The Categories of Life"	Followed by → "Immortal Sins"

"The Middle Men" is the sixth episode of Torchwood: Miracle Day, the fourth series of the British science fiction television series Torchwood. It was originally broadcast in the United States on Starz on 12 August 2011.

Torchwood: Miracle Day follows the aftermath of a day where humanity has stopped being able to die. In the episode, a team called Torchwood exposes information to the public about secretive concentration camps where wounded people are taken to be incinerated.

== Plot summary ==
In the pre-credits sequence, PhiCorp COO Stuart Owens (Ernie Hudson) attempts to investigate PhiCorp construction sites in Shanghai but his hired investigator (Eric Steinberg) jumps off a high-story building to end consciousness, rather than tell him the horror of what is really going on. Jack (John Barrowman) later confronts Owens and learns from him that PhiCorp is as much a pawn as any other player in the system, and that whoever orchestrated the miracle has been working towards it for a very long time. He also learns of another term relating to the miracle which Owens' team of investigators have uncovered: "the blessing", dating back to the 1990s.

In San Pedro, Rex (Mekhi Phifer) finishes his video message contained along with the footage of Dr. Juarez's (Arlene Tur) incineration, and Esther (Alexa Havins) begins to suspect something has happened to Dr. Juarez. Rex attempts to pass himself off as a soldier working at the San Pedro Overflow Camp but is unsuccessful and captured. Juarez's killer, camp director Colin Maloney (Marc Vann), briefly considers using Rex's video to expose the death of Dr. Juarez and become a hero, but then attempts to kill Rex. Esther finds them and is forced to strangle Maloney. With assistance from soldier Ralph Coltrane (Fred Koehler), who had been complicit in Juarez's murder, they are able to escape the compound with the footage. They release it, causing a public outcry, but do not affect the government's stance on Overflow Camps and the life and death category system.

In Wales, Gwen (Eve Myles) manages to break her father Geraint (William Thomas) out of the Overflow Camp as Rhys (Kai Owen) runs over the gates with Geraint in the back of his truck. With the Torchwood contact lenses, Gwen publicly broadcasts a message explaining the purpose of the Overflow Camps shortly before blowing up the Modules (where people are incinerated) at the Cardiff facility. However, touching down again in Los Angeles she is unable to make contact with Rhys. A mysterious phone call at the LAX white courtesy telephone tells her to put on her lenses, where she receives a message directly to her line of sight from some mysterious conspirators: they have her mother, husband and child, and to set them free she must deliver Jack.

== Reception ==
Assignment X described the episode as "lackluster", stating, "This story seems to excel in examining all the permutations of its premise in society – such as the intriguing "45 Club" early in this episode – but the further it goes in following the actual plotline with the Torchwood team and their investigation, the more frustrating it gets as a viewing experience". The Yorker was positive about the episode saying "With each new episode of Torchwood, the revelations become grimmer and more disturbing. The switch between Wales and the US works well now, and there’s a realistic contrast between the two."

The Guardian commented saying "it's actually starting to feel rather normal, this show being set in both California and Wales. It needed to eventually, It's Esther who really comes into her own this week. After inadvertently getting her sister's kids taken into care the other week, she's now gone through a Torchwood rite of passage in killing someone as Evil Colin enacts a horror movie cliche, grabbing her ankle and extending what are actually some pretty shocking and graphic scenes of violence against women. Still, her final, broken scene with Rex in the car, where unlike the rest of the team she would very clearly be doing absolutely anything else, was really very moving."
