= The Categories of Life =

2011 Torchwood episode

36 – "The Categories of Life"
- Torchwood episode

Cast
- Starring: John Barrowman – Captain Jack Harkness; Eve Myles – Gwen Cooper; Mekhi Phifer – Rex Matheson; Alexa Havins – Esther Drummond; Kai Owen – Rhys Williams; Bill Pullman – Oswald Danes
- Others: Lauren Ambrose – Jilly Kitzinger; Arlene Tur – Vera Juarez; William Thomas – Geraint Cooper; Sharon Morgan – Mary Cooper; Tom Price – PC Andy; Frederick Koehler – Ralph Coltrane; Teddy Sears – Blue-eyed Man; Marc Vann – Colin Maloney; Daniel Adegboyega – Guard; Brad Bell – Nurse Chris; Charles Carpenter – News Reporter; Jim Conway – Man; Jonathan Dane – Handsome Man; Teresa Garza – Spanish Newscaster; Brendan Hughes – Pidgeon; Joelle Elizabeth Jacoby – Excited Teenager; Liz Jenkins – Rachel; Ria Jones – Pushy Woman; Masami Kosaka – Japanese Newscaster; Eve Mauro – Maria Candido; Francine Morgan – Stressed Woman; Stuart Nurse – Thomason; Tracy Pfau – Pale Woman; Caroline Whitney Smith – Paramedic; Vito Viscuso – Angry Man; Randa Walker – Candice

Production
- Directed by: Guy Ferland
- Written by: Jane Espenson
- Produced by: Kelly A. Manners; Brian Minchin (UK unit)
- Executive producers: Russell T Davies; Julie Gardner; Jane Tranter; Jane Espenson (co-executive); Vlad Wolynetz (co-executive)
- Music by: Murray Gold
- Production code: 105
- Series: Miracle Day
- Running time: 55 minutes
- First broadcast: 5 August 2011 (US); 11 August 2011 (UK)

Chronology
← Preceded by "Escape to L.A."	Followed by → "The Middle Men"

"The Categories of Life" is the fifth episode of Torchwood: Miracle Day, the fourth series of the British science fiction television series Torchwood. It was first broadcast in the United States on Starz on 5 August 2011 and in the United Kingdom on BBC One on 11 August.

Torchwood: Miracle Day follows the aftermath of a day where humanity has stopped being able to die. In the episode, a team called Torchwood investigate a concentration camp in California where sick and injured people who are unable to die are sent to. Meanwhile, Torchwood team member Gwen Cooper (Eve Myles) returns to Wales to try to save her father Geraint (William Thomas) from one of these camps.

== Plot summary ==
The government panels are cancelled after PhiCorp and the world's governments implement a categorization system regarding life. Those who should have died and are brain-dead are assigned Category 1 status, and those who have persistent injuries/diseases are to be given Category 2 while Category 3 status are normal people who have no or minor injuries. Category 1s and 2s are sent to Overflow Camps which resemble concentration camps where there are hidden modules not appearing on satellite footage, and Torchwood suspects that these modules have a dark purpose.

Appalled by growing governmental control over life and death, Vera travels to California to assist Torchwood. As he survived a fatal injury, Rex investigates a camp in California as a Category 2 patient while Esther sneaks in and administratively assigns Rex a Category 1 status and smuggles him a camera to film evidence.

Using her medical panel credentials, Vera attempts to inspect the treatment of Category 1 patients and discovers that many conscious people are being assigned Category 1 status, essentially being declared non-living by the government. Vera threatens to prosecute Colin Maloney, the man overseeing the overflow camp, after she sees the inhumane conditions which conscious Category 1 patients are enduring. He panics and shoots her. To cover up his actions, he and soldier Ralph Coltrane transport her to one of the modules and place her inside.

Elsewhere, Jack tries to convince Oswald to use his fame to expose PhiCorp's advanced knowledge of the Miracle, but Oswald goes ahead with his pro-PhiCorp televised speech to a packed stadium. Meanwhile, Gwen returns to Wales to rescue her father from an Overflow Camp. During the escape attempt, her father suffers another heart attack and the doctors later give him Category 1 status, which Gwen struggles to challenge. When her husband Rhys reveals to her that the camp's personnel are taking Category 1 patients to the "burn unit", Gwen deduces that the modules are in fact incinerators used to burn the Category 1 patients. This is grimly confirmed when, back in the California Overflow Camp, Maloney activates the incinerator on the module containing Vera. Rex comes across Vera but cannot free her, and is forced to watch her being burned alive, reluctantly video-recording her agony.

== Reception ==
Writing for the Guardian, Dan Martin describes this episode as the episode in which "Miracle Day finally realised its potential". For Martin, the success of the episode is based on the fact that it revolves around "looking at humanity through a camera contact-lens, darkly". He concludes by opining that although this episode is set in a world completely different from our own this episode has greater verisimilitude than those previous.

AfterElton's Heather Hogan also praised the writing of the episode, stating that although she knew in advance that Vera was going to die, the ending left her with her mouth "completely agape". Hogan felt that the use of Nazi imagery relating to the in-universe use of the final solution was particularly unsettling. She questions whether this is making the show too dark, but ultimately concludes that the reverses applies, as Miracle Day now has her full attention, stating that the final scenes will continue to haunt her.

Writing for entertainment site io9 Charlie Jane Anders also praises the set-up of the episode, stating that it illuminates a basic truth about the perils of rationing healthcare. She also praises the way some of the failures of the protagonists (particularly Vera and Gwen) play into the episode, stating that "'The Categories of Life' exposes human vanity in the way that only a script by Jane Espenson could".
