= List of Torchwood characters =

This is a list of characters from the British science fiction television programme Torchwood, created by Russell T Davies. This list includes main characters, recurring characters and important guest characters. The main characters typically function as a team, defending the planet from alien and nefarious human threats. The series operated with a "monster of the week" format for its first two series before adopting a serial-based format for its third and fourth series, which feature an extended recurring cast of supporting characters.

== Main characters ==
=== Jack Harkness ===
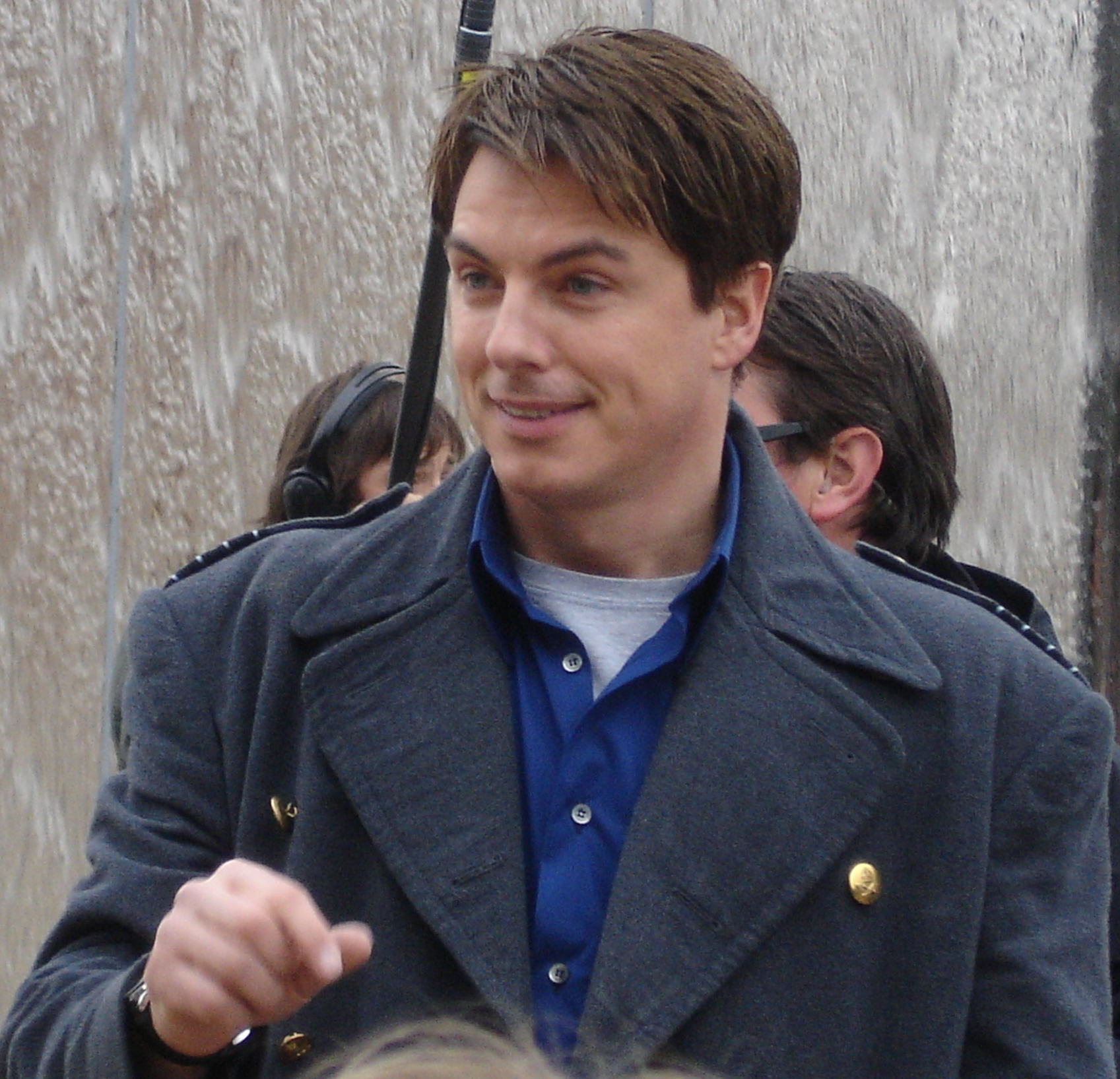
John Barrowman plays protagonist Jack Harkness

Jack Harkness, played by Scottish-American actor John Barrowman, is the leader of Torchwood Three. A former Time Agent born in the 51st century, Jack had two years of his memories wiped by the Time Agency and subsequently became a con man operating in the 20th century, where he stole the name of "Captain Jack Harkness"; his real name is unknown. After meeting the Ninth Doctor in Doctor Who, Jack reformed and changed his ways, and after a stint as the Doctor's time travelling companion found his way to Torchwood in the 19th century. Cursed with immortality following his previous adventure with the Doctor, Jack served Torchwood on-and-off for centuries, eventually becoming its leader at the start of the 21st century, and handpicking a new team for himself thereafter. As a result of his immortality, Jack has lived a long life, in which he has seen the loss of his brother Gray, his grandson Stephen, and numerous lovers, both male and female. Including Gwen Cooper and Ianto Jones.

=== Gwen Cooper ===
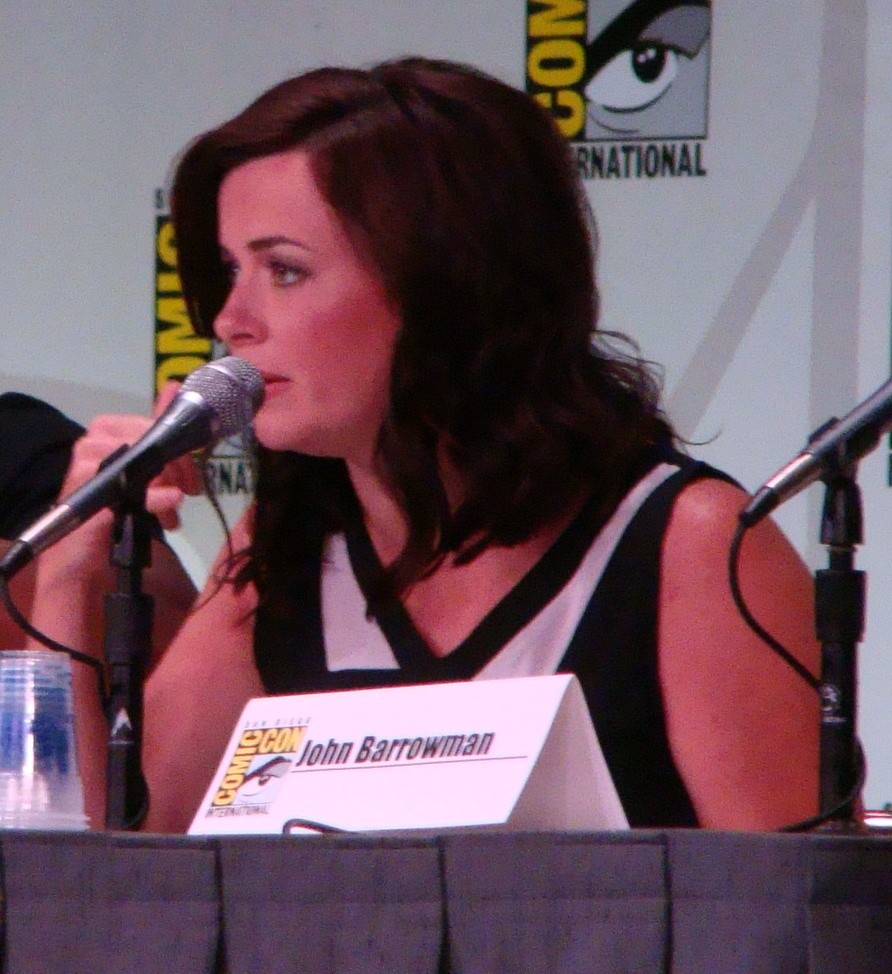
Eve Myles plays leading lady Gwen Cooper

Gwen Cooper, played by Welsh actress Eve Myles, was recruited into Torchwood Three in the series premiere "Everything Changes". A policewoman, partnered with PC Andy Davidson, Gwen by the second series becomes elevated to the team's second-in-command in her own mind, after taking control as leader during Jack's absence. Despite their relationship being tested by Gwen's dishonesty, feelings for Jack Harkness and a tempestuous affair with Owen Harper, Gwen and her live-in boyfriend Rhys eventually get married. Jack still has feelings towards Gwen, when he comes back he finds out that Gwen is married and gets disappointed. Gwen is one of two surviving agents following the destruction of the Cardiff branch of the Torchwood Institute, and goes into hiding following the birth of daughter Anwen. During Miracle Day she is conflicted between her Torchwood duties and her responsibility to her baby daughter and severely ill father.

Her family has lived in Wales for generations, and it is suggested by the Doctor (David Tennant) and Rose Tyler (Billie Piper) that Gwen is related to the Gwyneth (also portrayed by Eve Myles) whom they met in Cardiff in 1869 in "The Unquiet Dead", due to spatial genetic multiplicity.

=== Owen Harper ===
Doctor Owen Harper, played by American-born English actor Burn Gorman, is Torchwood Three's medical officer. After he loses his fiancée to an alien parasite, Owen's genius and determination are recognized by Captain Jack and he is recruited into the institute. Owen has many short-lived sexual relationships with women such as Suzie Costello and Gwen Cooper but remains largely indifferent to the affections of colleague Toshiko Sato. In Torchwood series 2, Owen is killed by Aaron Copley, and having been resurrected with alien technology is left in a state of living death; cheating death proves short-lived, as Owen is seemingly vaporised in a surge of radiation in the series 2 finale, "Exit Wounds".

=== Toshiko Sato ===
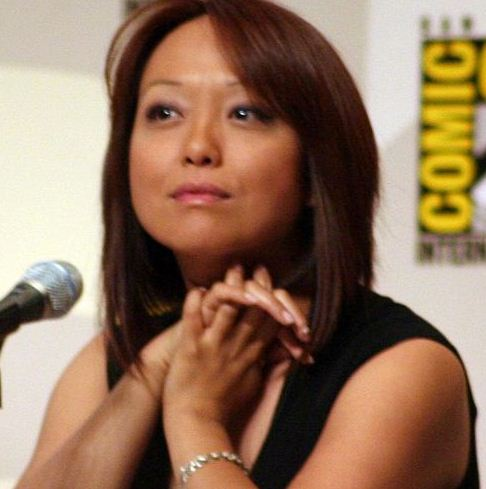
Naoko Mori plays tech expert Toshiko Sato

Toshiko Sato, played by Japanese-born British actress Naoko Mori, is Torchwood Three's technical expert and computer specialist. The character first appeared in the Doctor Who episode "Aliens of London", although this experience was not mentioned in Torchwood until her final appearance in the episode "Exit Wounds", where it was revealed that she was covering for team medic Owen. Toshiko is quiet, fiercely private and professional. A fantastic genius, she was recruited into Torchwood after being imprisoned by a similar organization, UNIT, from whom she stole design plans for a "sonic modulator" in a bid to free her captured mother. Working for Torchwood Three, Toshiko perfected the "Rift Manipulator" device for the organization. Throughout the series, Toshiko is seen to harbor feelings for Owen Harper; she confesses the extent of her feelings on her death-bed as Owen laments never managing to take her on the date he promised her.

=== Ianto Jones ===
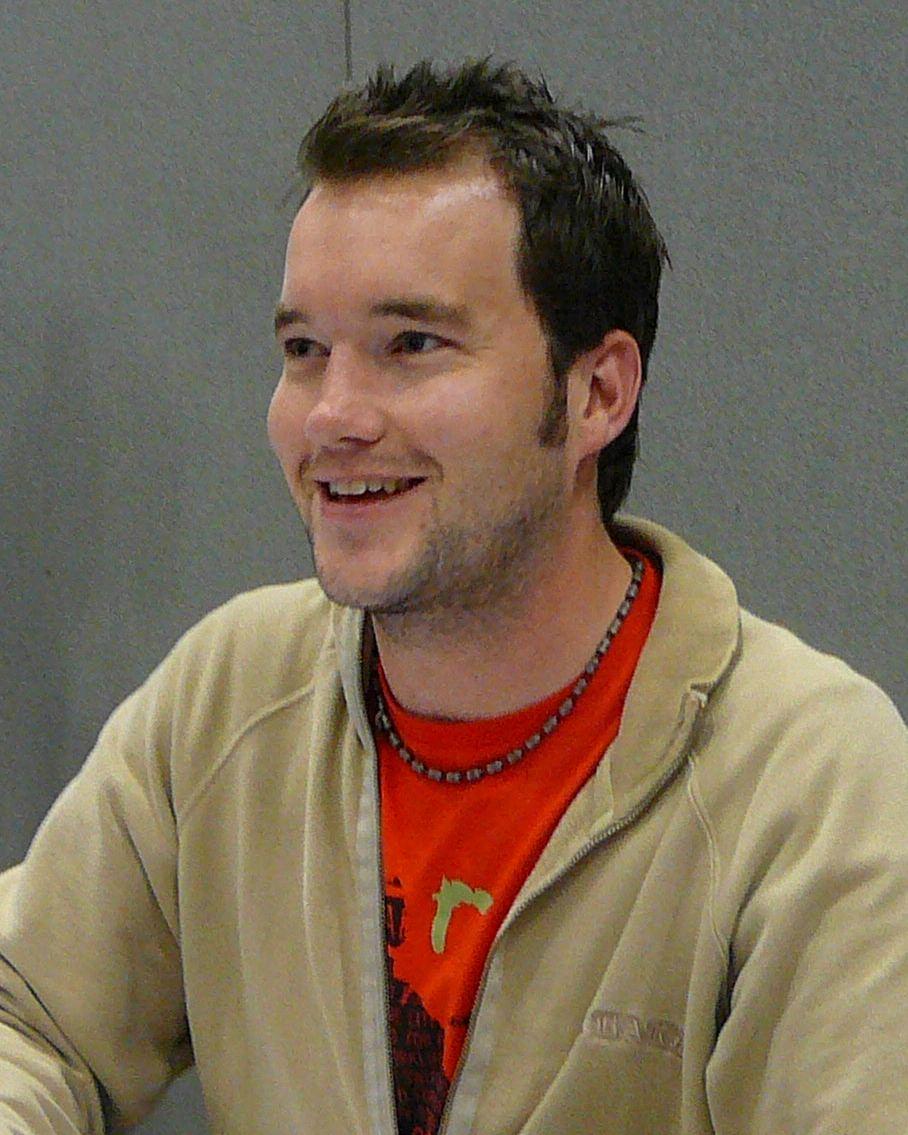
Gareth David-Lloyd plays general factotum Ianto Jones

Ianto Jones, played by Welsh actor Gareth David-Lloyd, is Torchwood Three's support man. His job initially involves managing clean-up operations concerning Torchwood's various activities and providing tea and coffee, although his role later expands to accompanying the team on field missions. Having transferred to Torchwood Three from the head branch in London (Torchwood One), Ianto at first has the main motivation of simply housing his partially cyber-converted girlfriend Lisa Hallett, who later breaks loose and is exterminated by the team in "Cyberwoman". He enters into a sexual relationship with Jack in the first series, which meets with mixed reactions from the other characters; Owen, for example, characterizes him as Jack's "part time shag". Ianto never received full security in his relationship with Jack or with his sexuality; shortly after he became secure with their being labelled a "couple", he was killed by a virus in episode four of the 2009 serial Children of Earth.

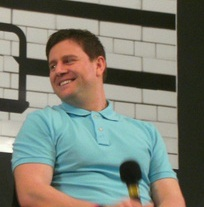
Kai Owen plays Gwen's partner, Rhys Williams

=== Rhys Williams ===
Rhys Alun Williams, portrayed by Welsh actor Kai Owen, is a recurring character in the first two series and a main cast member from the third series onwards. Rhys is initially introduced as Gwen's oblivious live-in boyfriend, but as the series progresses he becomes aware of the existence of extraterrestrial life, and the true nature of Gwen's job. The two marry in the episode "Something Borrowed" and proclaim a relationship based on truth. When the government attempt to assassinate Gwen Cooper in Children of Earth, Rhys goes on the run with the team, assisting his wife in lieu of a fourth team member following the deaths of Tosh and Owen. Though he would rather live a domestic life with Gwen and their daughter Anwen in the fourth series, Rhys again finds himself having to assist Torchwood—which is no longer an official government agency, but rather a band of fugitives—over the course of the fourth series.

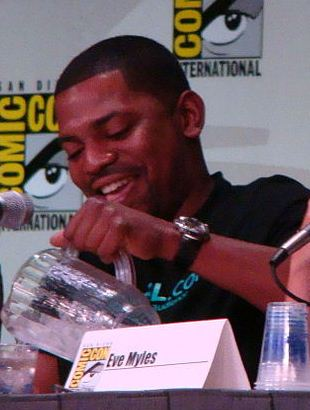
Mekhi Phifer plays CIA agent Rex Matheson

=== Rex Matheson ===
Rex Matheson, played by American actor Mekhi Phifer, is a field agent for the CIA whose investigation into Torchwood leads him to join the organization after he is betrayed by the CIA. Rex is immediately connected to the supernatural event which is preventing humans from dying; he survives a fatal wound to the heart in the first episode of Miracle Day. Well-trained within the CIA, Rex finds himself frustrated by Jack and Gwen's ad hoc and sometimes unprofessional approach to field work, and also by Esther's lack of experience. He befriends and romances Vera Juarez, and is appalled at what happens to her. As the series progresses, Rex softens to his teammates, particularly Esther who he is unwilling to sacrifice at the expense of the world. After the Miracle ends, Rex is horrified to discover he seems to be Immortal in the same vein as Captain Jack.

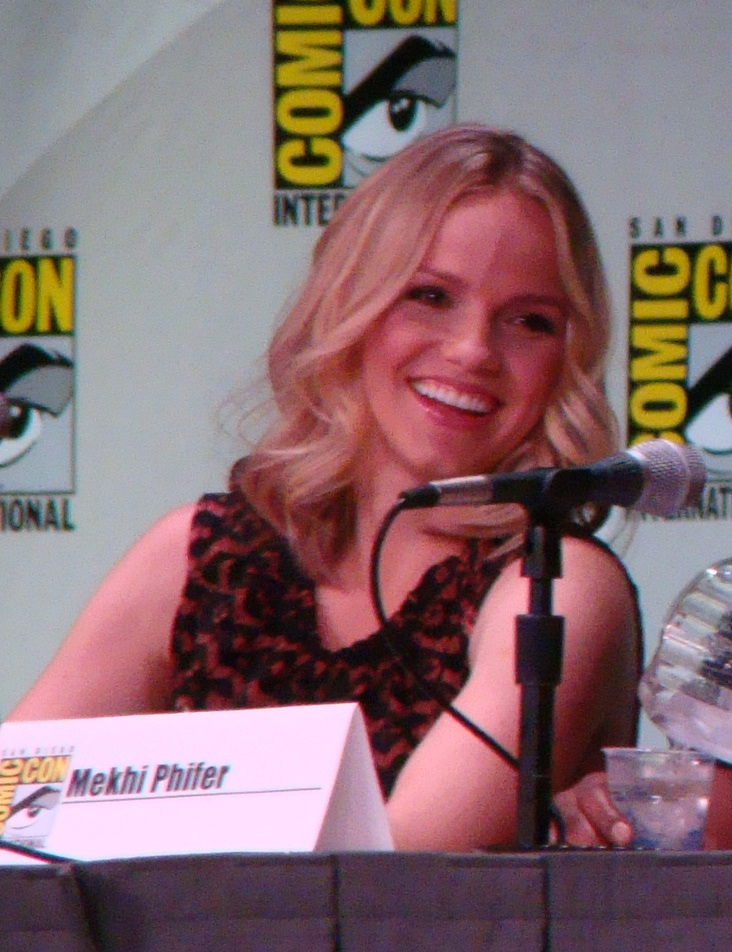
Alexa Havins plays CIA analyst Esther Drummond

=== Esther Drummond ===
Esther Drummond, played by American actress Alexa Havins, is an analyst working for the Central Intelligence Agency (CIA) alongside Rex Matheson, whose lifestyle as a field agent she romantically envies. After her investigation into Torchwood leads to her betrayal by the CIA, she joins Torchwood. Though a rookie in the field, she provides the team with a competent computer analyst and hacker as they investigate the so-called miracle which has prevented death from occurring to human beings on Earth. As the series progresses, Esther also takes part in the team's undercover operations and at one point spends two months on the run with Jack Harkness in Scotland. She is eventually fatally shot in Buenos Aires as a measure to persuade Rex not to reverse the Miracle.

=== Oswald Danes ===
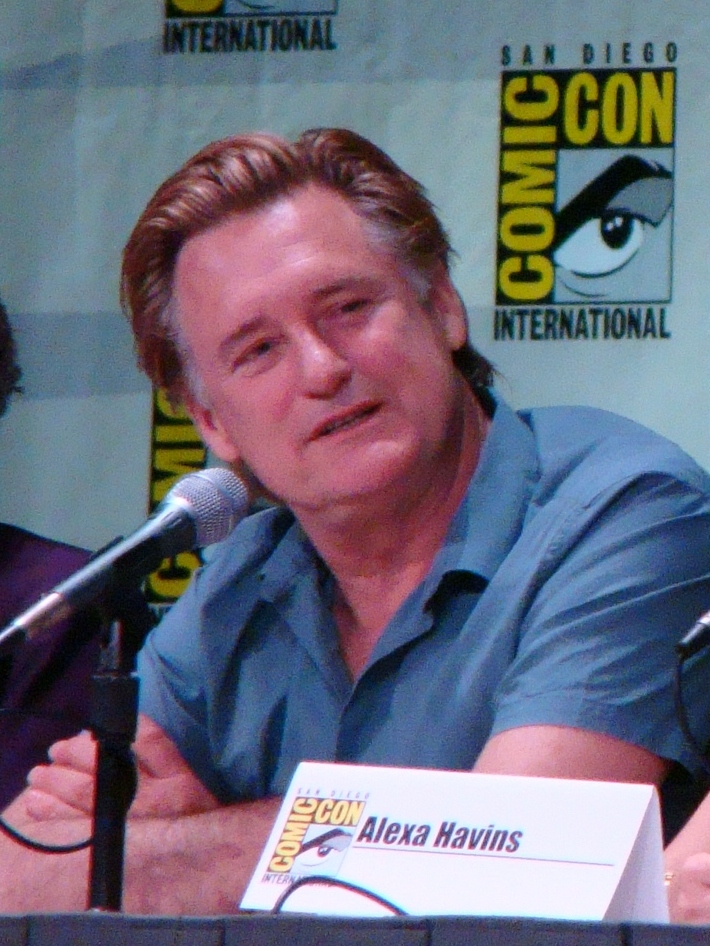
Bill Pullman plays convicted rapist Oswald Danes

Oswald Danes, played by American actor Bill Pullman, is a former schoolteacher; in 2006, he was convicted and sentenced to death in Kentucky for raping and murdering a 12-year-old girl named Susie Cabina. His only defense for the crime was that "she should've run faster". He is executed by lethal injection in a Kentucky penitentiary; though the execution is carried out, Danes does not die thanks to Miracle Day. As a convicted murderer and child rapist, Danes is vilified by the public, but opinions begin to change when he tearfully expresses remorse for his crimes in a television interview. After she offers him protection and exposure Danes accepts an offer of representation from Jilly Kitzinger and enjoys a brief media career. Danes ultimately kills himself with a bomb at the climax of Miracle Day.

== Supporting characters introduced by series ==
=== Series one (2006–07) ===
==== Suzie Costello ====
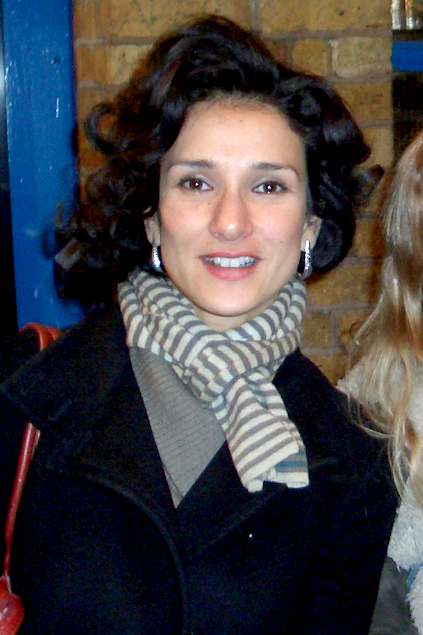
Indira Varma played rogue Torchwood operative Suzie Costello

Suzie Costello, portrayed by Indira Varma, is a principal character in the first episode "Everything Changes". The second-in-command of Torchwood Three, the Cardiff-based wing of the Torchwood Institute, she has been researching a piece of alien technology, a glove which has the ability to resurrect creatures that have recently died, but only for a short period of time. It is revealed later in the episode that she has been murdering people in order to create test subjects for the Glove, having become obsessed with trying to make it work permanently. While confessing her crimes to Gwen Cooper, she prepares to shoot Gwen in order to cover up her crimes, when Jack arrives. Suzie shoots Jack in the head, but he rises again due to his inability to die, and she commits suicide by placing the muzzle beneath her chin and shooting herself instead. In "They Keep Killing Suzie", the Torchwood team brings her back to life using the Resurrection Gauntlet (wielded by Gwen) and the "Life Knife". Unknown to the team, this was part of a plan that Suzie set up months before her death. She appears to be resurrected permanently and unable to be killed. However, this is because the gauntlet is continuing to transfer life energy between her and Gwen. Suzie feels inferior to and resents Gwen for "replacing" her in all areas, including having a relationship with Owen Harper. When asked what she experienced while dead, she initially claims that she remembers nothing but darkness, but later tells Jack that she sensed something in the darkness that is coming for him. Suzie manipulates Gwen into freeing her from the base and subsequently murders her own father. Expressing regret over Gwen's impending death but still willing to sacrifice her to remain alive, Suzie continues draining Gwen's life energy and remains alive even after Jack shoots her multiple times, until Toshiko Sato destroys the gauntlet, breaking the energy transfer and finally killing Suzie once more. Jack tells Ianto Jones to record the multiple causes of death as "Death by Torchwood".

Suzie has a leading role in the novel Long Time Dead, a prequel to Torchwood: Miracle Day.

==== Andy Davidson ====
Andy Davidson, played by Tom Price, is Gwen Cooper's former police partner, an officer for the South Wales Police in Cardiff. Price is credited as a guest star in all four series. PC Andy first appears in Torchwood's première episode, "Everything Changes" and reappears on a semi-regular basis. Andy had a crush on Gwen when the two worked together and still has feelings for her. Whilst he never quite understands the function of the Torchwood Institute, he appreciates that Gwen's work for Torchwood involves "spooky", extraterrestrial situations, and therefore comes to trust them. When his loyalties are put to the test in Children of Earth he sides with Gwen rather than follow government procedure. In Miracle Day, Andy is now a sergeant and one of few people to have Gwen's contact details while she is in hiding. He is later forced to assist the CIA with her rendition to the United States by Rex Matheson.

==== Lisa Hallett ====
Lisa Hallett, played by Caroline Chikezie, is introduced in "Cyberwoman" as a former employee of Torchwood One in London and ex-girlfriend of Ianto Jones. It is established that during the "Battle of Canary Wharf" the Cybermen needed more troops and began directly converting people rather than transplanting their brains into Cyberman shells. Lisa is in the midst of conversion when Ianto rescues her, taking her and a support system to Torchwood Three where he keeps her in a basement until he can restore her humanity. Once freed from the unit, her Cyberman persona asserts itself and she attempts to take over the Hub in order to use it as a base for a new Cyber army. Seeing how far Ianto has gone to protect her, she transplants her brain into the body of a pizza delivery girl so they can be together. Still claiming they could both be upgraded, her new body is shot and killed by the rest of the Torchwood team. What appeared to be Lisa's spirit reappears in "End of Days", urging Ianto to open the Rift.

==== Cannibal villagers ====
Evan, Helen and nephew Huw Sherman, portrayed by Owen Teale, Maxine Evans, and Rhys ap Trefor respectively, are residents from a village with a very strange tradition in the episode "Countrycide". Once every ten years the villagers cannibalise any travelers passing by, through, or to their village. The Torchwood team travelled to the vicinity of the village in order to investigate disappearances in the area, thinking they could be connected to the Rift; when they were drawn into a trap orchestrated by the villagers, they discovered their unsettling secret. When the apparent ringleader of the group, Evan, was eventually captured and questioned, the only reason he gave for following this tradition was that "it made me happy."

==== Mary ====
Mary portrayed by Daniela Denby-Ashe is featured in "Greeks Bearing Gifts" as a 19th-century prostitute. After fleeing from one of her potential johns, a soldier, Mary encountered an alien (later to be discovered as an Arcateenian) in the woods. The alien took over Mary's body and used it to live through the remainder of the 19th and 20th centuries. The Arcateenian later used Mary's preserved body to seduce Toshiko Sato.

==== Diane Holmes ====
Diane Holmes, played by Louise Delamere, first appears in "Out of Time". She is a pilot and early feminist from 1953 who becomes stranded in 2007 due to the Cardiff Rift. She enters a relationship with Owen, and he falls in love with her. After staying with Owen for a short time, and admitting her own love for him, she says farewell to a distraught Owen. Diane flies off in her plane, feeling the Rift will open again for her and take her somewhere new. Diane is seen in flashback clips in "Combat", "Captain Jack Harkness", and "A Day in the Death". She reappears briefly to Owen as a vision created by Bilis in "End of Days" insisting he do whatever he can to save her; the encounter leaves him in tears.

==== Eugene Jones ====
Eugene Jones, played by Paul Chequer, appears in the Torchwood episode "Random Shoes". When he was younger, his science teacher gave him an alien eye. As he got older, he started to get interested in aliens, approaching Torchwood a number of times. They paid no attention at all to him. He was described as a loser, a failure, a geek and an ordinary guy.

In the present, he is killed in a hit-and-run accident. When he discovers that he is still "hanging around" he stays with the team, particularly Gwen, as they investigate his life. Reminiscing on his past, Eugene recalls how, one day, he tried to sell the eye on eBay. The bidding flew up to £15,005.50, but two of his mates had actually set it up, making it go higher just to cheer him up; the previous bid was only £5.50 lower, and Eugene was convinced that the alien had been trying to get his eye back. When the eye is removed from his body, he briefly becomes solid and saves Gwen from an oncoming car, before disappearing in a bright light.

==== Captain Jack Harkness ====
Group Captain Jack Harkness, RAF, played by Matt Rippy, appears in the episode "Captain Jack Harkness". When Torchwood's Jack Harkness and Toshiko Sato fall back in time to 1941, they meet him and discover him to be the real Captain Jack Harkness, whose name the con-man known as Jack appropriated.

Captain Harkness is a young American serving as a Group Captain in a RAF Eagle Squadron, stationed in Cardiff. He is in a heterosexual relationship, but is revealed to be attracted to Torchwood's Jack. During his time with Jack and Tosh, he is shown to be a compassionate man, backing up Jack's story of Tosh working as a decoder for the government to protect her from the current anti-Japanese prejudice and bonding with Jack over their mutual grief over the responsibility of having to witness those they care for die while they survive. He is distressed at the idea that the woman he is dating while stationed in Cardiff is in love with him, unhappy to lead her on. After some indecision, and after Torchwood's Jack hints that he would soon die, he eventually strikes up the courage to dance with Torchwood's Jack in front of a party of servicemen and their guests. Before Torchwood's Jack leaves to return to the present, the two kiss passionately. The next day, Captain Jack Harkness dies fighting German fighters. In the present day, Toshiko Sato comforts Torchwood's Jack by telling him that 1941's Captain Jack would be proud that he had taken his name, carrying it on as he saves the world.

==== Bilis Manger ====
Bilis Manger
- Torchwood character
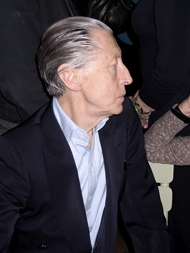
- First appearance: "Captain Jack Harkness"
- Portrayed by: Murray Melvin

In-universe information
- Affiliation: Abaddon
- Home era: Unknown

Bilis Manger, played by Murray Melvin, is a main antagonist of the first series. He has the ability to walk through time and teleport at will, In "Captain Jack Harkness", he appears as the manager of a 1941 dance hall, and in the present day remains its caretaker, ostensibly co-operating with Gwen when she visits the now derelict venue searching for Jack and Toshiko. However, he sabotages Toshiko's plans back in 1941 to send the full second half of the equations needed to bring back her and Jack more safely, by scratching away the last part of the equation. He took photographs, though, to ensure that the team would locate them in the past and have to open the rift to rescue them. In "End of Days", he reappears, first as an apparition to Gwen, then, in his shop, A Stitch in Time, where he reveals that he is able to travel between eras at will. He then infiltrates the Torchwood base, stabbing Rhys Williams, spurring Gwen to once more open the rift to save everyone's lives, however, this full opening unwittingly releases Abaddon. Moments later, Manger is found outside by the members of the team, telling them that his plan all along was to release Abaddon, who had been "chained under the rift", before vanishing again.

The character returns in the spin-off novel The Twilight Streets by Gary Russell, apparently sponsoring the advertisement of a newly developed area of Cardiff. During this encounter, it is revealed that not only is he on the staff of Torchwood despite lacking any employee information – his hand print is granted full access in all Torchwood bases, but there is no record of his employment or specific role in the Institute – but also that his actions in releasing Abaddon were fundamentally benevolent, as Abaddon was required to stop sentient particles known as 'the Dark' that would corrupt the Torchwood team and drive them to turn against Jack to find a way of using the Rift to gain access to advanced technology. With the aid of the Torchwood team, Manger manages to defeat the Dark, and is last seen leaving on a train with a box that apparently contains Abaddon's ashes.

Melvin reprised the role of Billis in several audio dramas for Big Finish.

=== Series two (2008) ===
==== Captain John Hart ====
Captain John Hart, played by James Marsters, first appears in the episode "Kiss Kiss, Bang Bang" as a rogue Time Agent and former partner of Jack Harkness, both professionally and sexually. He has been in rehab for drink, drugs, sex and murder. Captain John Hart appears through the Rift using a Vortex Manipulator in order to seek help from Jack. In "Exit Wounds", Captain John is revealed to have rescued Jack's brother Gray from his old captors, only to learn too late that Gray had been driven insane over the years.

==== Beth Halloran ====
Beth Halloran, played by Nikki Amuka-Bird, appears in "Sleeper". She is one of four alien sleeper agents in Cardiff belonging to Cell 114, but is totally unaware of this. She and three others were created and given human lives and memories to learn all they could about humans before her alien programming was activated, to commence their attack of Earth. After helping the team to track down the final agent, she pretends to intend on killing Gwen to provoke Torchwood into suicide by cop so that she does not one day experience the dehumanization of having her alien consciousness awoken. Like all sleepers of her species, Beth's arm can transform into a blade-like weapon and can deploy explosive devices, in addition to this she possesses a tight-knit protective force field (which also projects false humanoid vitals) and superhuman strength. According to the Torchwood website, her body is stored in the cryogenics area.

==== Tommy Brockless ====
Tommy Brockless, portrayed by Anthony Lewis, appears in "To the Last Man". A combat stress reaction / shell-shocked World War I soldier, born in 1894, Tommy is brought into Torchwood Three's custody and cryopreserved in 1918 after his future self instructs them to do as such through a time slip. It is these time slips that Tommy is instrumental in stopping. At an unspecified year in his future, fragments of 1918 and the present will bleed together, potentially destroying the world. Hence, once every year, Torchwood awakens Tommy to check whether his presence is required and to give him a "day out."

It is 2008 when these events eventually begin to unfold. As this begins to happen, Tommy must be sent back to his own time acting as a metaphorical "stitch in time," pulling all of 1918 back to where it belongs. However, during his last day, Tommy falls for Toshiko, making his decision all the more difficult. He is eventually convinced to do so thanks to Toshiko, who encourages him to fix the Rift by referring to him as her 'brave, handsome hero' (quoting Thomas's own words to her). She cannot reveal to Tommy that he will be one of hundreds of Shell shock victims executed for cowardice.

==== Gerald & Harriet ====
Gerald Carter (Roderic Culver) and Harriet Derbyshire (Siobhan Hewlett) appear in flashback sequences of "To the Last Man" investigating the case of Brockless in 1918. Trained in military intelligence, Carter would later become leader of Torchwood Three in Cardiff. Derbyshire was recruited directly from the University of Oxford (where she observed physics lectures) into Torchwood Three. It is noted in the episode that Harriet died at the age of 26. According to the Torchwood website, Carter had been an avid supporter of early "Rift theory", and after controversially being placed in charge of the team in 1907 managed to bring great strides. However, following the death of Harriet Derbyshire, Carter felt responsible and retired to a consultancy position, until his death in 1942. According to the website Harriet is one of the notable employees whose bodies are stored in the cryogenics area.

==== Adam Smith ====
"Adam Smith", an alien who feeds and survives off memories, appears in "Adam", played by Bryan Dick. Previously trapped in an extradimensional Void, Adam is drawn to the Torchwood team due to their unique memories and escapes the Void through the Rift. In less than 48 hours he is able to plant false memories in the team, posing as a member of Torchwood. It is this belief in him that allows him to survive. Accompanying the survival instinct, Adam shows a tendency to use his powers recreationally and maliciously. He provides a drastic role-reversal for both Toshiko, now a promiscuous extrovert who shares a passionate relationship with Adam, and Owen, now a shy geek with unrequited feelings for Toshiko. Adam also provides Jack with a resurgence of the repressed memories of the last pleasant memories of his family before his father's death and his brother's disappearance. As a side-effect of such new memory creation, other memories must be forced from the mind, leading Gwen to totally forget Rhys. When Ianto looks over his diary and discovers no reference to Adam, Adam attempts to escape by torturing Ianto with false memories of being a serial killer, only for Jack to see through the lie thanks to his knowledge of Ianto's personality. Although Adam tries to threaten Jack by altering his few happy memories of his childhood, Jack nevertheless deals with Adam's existence by giving everyone in the team 48-hour amnesia pills. Forgetting Adam causes his death and leaves the team puzzling the loss of the last 48 hours.

==== Gray ====
Gray, portrayed by Ethan Brooke as a child and by Lachlan Nieboer as an adult, is Captain Jack's younger brother and a main antagonist of the second series. Gray is first alluded to in the series two premiere "Kiss Kiss, Bang Bang", when Jack's former partner John Hart states that he "found Gray".

In "Adam", Jack's memories of his brother are brought to the surface by an alien who meddles with his memories. Jack recalls letting go of his brother's hand and losing him during an alien invasion in their homeland of the Boeshane Peninsula, an action he regards as the worst thing he ever did. Young Jack (Jack Montgomery) searches for Gray but is unable to find him. When the alien is defeated, he taunts Jack that he will lose these memories of his brother.

In "Fragments", Captain John shows Jack a hologram of Gray. Appearing in "Exit Wounds", Gray is a damaged character who has endured a lifetime of torture; having learnt cruelty from his captors, Gray is a vengeful sadist. Gray returns to Jack only to reveal that he blames him for the torture he has endured over the course of his life. Seeking to punish his brother, Gray buries Jack alive in Cardiff in the year AD 27, placing him in a permanent cycle of death and resurrection. In present day, Gray wreaks havoc across Cardiff, and murders Torchwood member Toshiko Sato, who had been attempting to prevent a nuclear explosion which Gray had triggered. Jack, having been exhumed by Torchwood in the 19th century and subsequently placed into stasis, re-emerges and forgives Gray, and asks that his brother do the same. Gray refuses to absolve Jack, who sorrowfully chloroforms his younger brother. Jack places Gray inside a cryogenic chamber, knowing he may never awaken.

==== Martha Jones ====
Dr Martha Jones, played by Freema Agyeman, is a returning Doctor Who character who first appears on-screen in Torchwood in the episode "Reset". A former time-travelling companion of the Tenth Doctor, Martha helped him and Jack avert an apocalyptic future in the Doctor Who episodes "Utopia", "The Sound of Drums", and "Last of the Time Lords". In "Reset", it is revealed that Martha has become a Doctor of Medicine and a medical officer for the extraterrestrial response agency UNIT. After helping Torchwood solve a series of mysterious deaths around Cardiff, she becomes involved in assisting the team following the death and resurrection of Torchwood's medic Owen Harper in the episodes "Dead Man Walking" and "A Day in the Death". She collaborates with Jack, Gwen and Ianto again in the Doctor Who serial "The Stolen Earth"/"Journey's End" and the Torchwood radio play "Lost Souls". The creative team had originally intended for Martha to appear in series three, Torchwood: Children of Earth but Agyeman was unavailable.

==== Aaron Copley ====
Aaron Copley, portrayed by Alan Dale, is the leader of experimental medical facility "The Pharm" and features in "Reset". When his facility claims to have developed a miracle substance able to cure medically incurable diseases such as diabetes and cancer, the Torchwood team investigate. Martha Jones is sent in by Captain Jack, allowing Torchwood to gain access to Copley's files. It is discovered that he has captured alien specimens (including a giant mayfly and a weevil) and used their bodily fluids to develop the "Reset" cure. When Copley discovers that Martha knows this, and has herself actually travelled in time and space, he begins to carry out intrusive tests on her, believing that time travel may have altered her cells making her more likely to survive the treatment. After Martha is eventually saved by the team, and the Pharm's computer records are wiped and the aliens euthanized, Copley follows them outside and pulls a gun on her. Whilst trying to calm Copley down, Owen Harper is shot dead. In an act of revenge, Jack shoots Copley in the head, instantly killing him.

==== Little Girl ====
Skye Bennett plays a mysterious fortune teller who is a psychic, ageless tarot card reader, credited only as Little Girl. Outwardly a little girl, she is seen in both the 19th and 21st centuries as appearing roughly the same age. In her first appearance, "Dead Man Walking", she sends Jack to the disused St. Mary's parish church, the location of the second Resurrection Gauntlet, but promises it will bring further complications. Appearing for a second time in a 19th-century flashback, in the episode "Fragments", she approaches Jack to read his cards and tells him he will have to wait a century before meeting The Doctor once again.

According to the TARDIS Datacore, the Little Girl may actually be Faith, a girl who lived and died in the 14th century and referenced in "Dead Man Walking."

==== Henry Parker ====
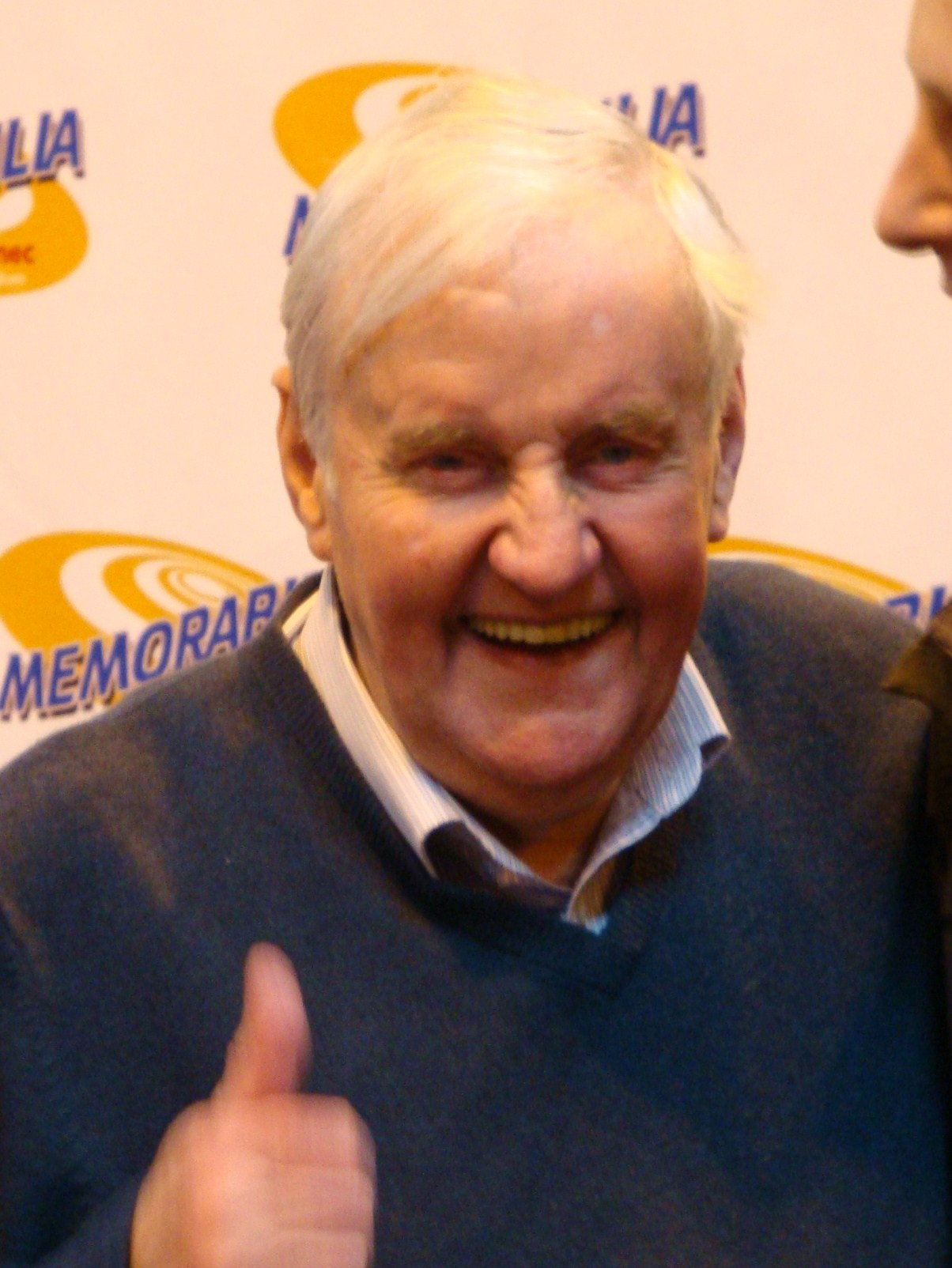
Richard Briers's performance was praised by reviewers.

Henry Parker, played by Richard Briers, is an elderly collector of alien artifacts in the episode "A Day in the Death". Following his wife's death he became intensely reclusive, guarding his house with hired security personnel. Torchwood describe him as "mostly harmless" and compare him to Howard Hughes. By 2008 Parker is dying from a failing heart, having suffered from three heart attacks, and a failed bypass. Terrified of death, he activated the Pulse, an artefact, taking it into his bed believing it to be a healing device. Because this device was giving off strange energy readings, Torchwood send in the technically deceased Owen Harper to bypass Parker's security and intervene. During a discussion with Harper, Parker revealed knowledge of the Torchwood Three team, and mentioned his own fear of death. Soon after Owen deactivated the pulse, Parker died of natural causes; Harper attempted artificial respiration to keep the man alive, but was unable to produce breath to do so.

Digital Spy's Ben Rawson-Jones praised Brier's "emotive portrayal" of Parker and found his death scene particularly moving. He also comments that his performance in this episode compensated for his "bizarrely over the top" performance in the Doctor Who serial Paradise Towers. Airlock Alpha's Alan Stanley Blair remarked that Parker's death "wonderfully pulled all the threads for the arc into one conclusive ending" whilst SFX's Richard Edwards felt that the character was "worthy of more screen time".

==== Geraint Cooper ====
Geraint Wyn Cooper, played by William Thomas, is Gwen's father, who first appears in "Something Borrowed". He is married to Gwen's mother Mary and lives in Swansea. Present at Gwen's wedding to Rhys he is alarmed to see her pregnant and more so when she tells him the true nature of her job. He attempts to phone the police when the shape shifting alien Nostrovite first attacks; but is prevented from doing so as Torchwood have jammed the phone lines. Despite Gwen and Rhys proclaiming that they will not keep secrets from each other in their marriage, Geraint's memories of the day are erased by Jack Harkness. Geraint subsequently forgets about the alien pregnancy, the wedding fiasco and the nature of Gwen's job; which his daughter feels to be "for the best".

Between Children of Earth and Miracle Day Geraint becomes a grandfather to baby Anwen, and is properly told about Gwen's work for Torchwood. In "The New World", the first episode of Miracle Day, he is the victim of several heart attacks, yet does not die because of the "miracle" affecting the human population. Gwen returns from hiding to visit him in hospital and experiences conflicting emotions about his predicament. In "Escape to L.A." Rhys unwittingly sends Geraint to a government run overflow camp that is under the control of PhiCorp. In "The Categories of Life", he and Gwen break into the camp to rescue Geraint, but their first attempt triggers another cardiac arrest, upgrading his government-appointed status from Category Two (conscious and living) to Category One (unconscious and due to be incinerated). Gwen and Rhys successfully rescue Geraint in "The Middle Men". Two months later, Gwen and Mary attempt to conceal Geraint from government officers in their basement, but he is recaptured in "The Gathering", and taken back to the overflow camp to be incinerated. In "The Blood Line", Gwen recounts a childhood memory of her father where he had received blame for money going missing from his work. Eager to help, Gwen had got together her pocket money but her father confided in her that what had bothered him was that people thought him dishonest. Gwen remembered this as the first time anybody had spoken to her as an adult. Later, with aid from Andy, Rhys gains access to the overflow camp and sits at Geraint's side as the Miracle is finally negated, allowing Mary to say goodbye to her husband by telephone.

==== Mary Cooper ====
Mary Cooper, played by Sharon Morgan, is the mother of Gwen Cooper and is introduced in "Something Borrowed". Prior to her first appearance, Gwen's mother was first referenced in "Ghost Machine" when Gwen relives a memory of Rhys and herself preparing to leave for Mary's sixtieth birthday party. In "Something Borrowed" Mary acts fastidious and difficult; she is persistent in nagging her husband Geraint and in scoring points against Rhys' Mum, Brenda. Like Geraint she is happy at the prospect of a grandchild from Gwen, because she believes the pregnancy will shock Brenda. Although Mary does not know the nature of Gwen's job she is caught up in the adventure when she is threatened by the Nostrovite; who has assumed Brenda's appearance. Despite Gwen and Rhys proclaiming they will not keep secrets from each other; Mary's memories—like those of the other wedding guests—are erased by Jack Harkness. Mary forgets about the events of the wedding day, including her daughter's alien pregnancy, which Gwen feels to be "for the best". Mary was referenced in the Doctor Who story "The Stolen Earth"—in which Gwen instructs Rhys to tell her mother to "take her pills and go to sleep" during the Dalek invasion.

In "The New World", the first episode of Torchwood: Miracle Day Mary accompanies her husband to hospital after he has a heart attack, and meets her granddaughter Anwen for the first time. With Gwen in hiding, Mary now knows the full workings of her daughter's former occupation and asks her for information about the miracle. When Gwen is rendition to the United States, Rhys and Anwen move in with Mary and Geraint. After Geraint is taken to an overflow camp, Mary encourages Gwen's rescue mission. She is later kidnapped and held hostage in an attempt to force Gwen to hand in Jack Harkness. However, the family is rescued by a South Wales attack team, led by sergeant Andy Davidson, Gwen's ex-colleague. Mary's life-threatening experience results in her telling Gwen not to give up, and to "go and get the bastards" responsible. In "The Gathering", set two months later, Mary is seen hiding her category one husband from the authorities. When the house is initially searched, Mary breaks down in tears after having been forced to pin down and stifle her husband to silence him. When the house is searched a second time, Mary is refused entry and reluctantly signs forms releasing her dead husband, who is taken back to the overflow camp in preparation for incineration. After Rhys gains an emergency police visa to visit the camp, and Gwen helps end the "Miracle", Mary gets a final chance to say goodbye to Geraint.

Series writer Jane Espenson draws an analogy between the series four plot of Gwen and Mary hiding Geraint in the basement to the living situation described by Anne Frank in "The Diary of Anne Frank". Although the eventual goodbye scene between Mary and Geraint did not feature heard dialogue, the content of her conversation was part of the initial script for the episode. Writing for the entertainment section of AOL's website Brad Trechak notes that he was highly amused by "the extremely British snark" exhibited by Mary in the episode "Something Borrowed". AfterElton's Steven Frank compares the character to "a tightly wound Helen Mirren" and also praises the "cattish behavior" displayed in her interactions with Brenda. The Radio Times' Patrick Mulkern praised the storyline of the Cooper family in "The Gathering" describing the scenes with Mary and Gwen hiding Geraint in the cellar as "tense" and "touching".

==== Nikki Bevan ====
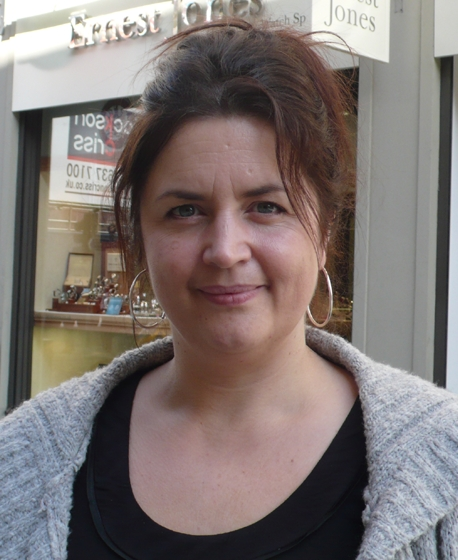
Ruth Jones played Nikki.

Nikki Bevan, played by Ruth Jones, appears in Adrift as the single mother of a missing teenager, Jonah Bevan. During the police investigation she is befriended by Andy, who takes a personal interest in the case and refers Jonah's disappearance to Gwen Cooper. Unable to let her son go, Nikki spends her time obsessively looking through VHS tapes of crowd footage at major events trying to see her son. She sets up a self-help group called Searchlight for families of lost people in Cardiff, which alerts Gwen to the fact that the disappearances are widespread. Gwen eventually locates Jonah, aged and deformed in a secret hospital for those who had been taken by the rift and then returned. Nikki at first denies the fact that this man is Jonah but after he mentions childhood experiences the two have a heart-felt reunion. However, due to off-world torture Jonah is insane and spends twenty hours a day howling incessantly. Nikki is devastated that she cannot take her son home for a conventional relationship and blames Gwen, before giving up and throwing out Jonah's belongings.

TV Squad's Jason Hughes praised the emotional scenes of Nikki being brought to see Jonah by Gwen and the "tragic emotional impact" of her telling Gwen to not do the same to any other families. He felt her role in the narrative worked as "an ambiguous moral about knowing versus not knowing" and praised the writer for not providing an easy answer.

==== Alex Hopkins ====
Alex Hopkins, portrayed by Julian Lewis Jones, is a former Torchwood Three leader, whose term ended on New Year's Eve, 1999 when he murdered his entire team and committed suicide. Before killing himself, he made freelance agent Jack Harkness the head of Torchwood Three, rewarding him for a century of loyal service. Having been shown an image of the future, Alex felt his team was grossly unprepared to deal with what was to come. His last words prophesied that the world was not ready for the changes the 21st century was to undergo. According to the Torchwood website, he is one of the notable employees whose bodies are stored in the cryogenics area, along with his entire team. The website also credits him in a letter with designing the Torchwood SUV; it had been his idea to have "TORCHWOOD" written across the side of it, despite concerns it would "compromise [Torchwood's] status as a clandestine quasi-governmental organization."

==== Alice Guppy ====
Alice Guppy, played by Amy Manson, was an employee of Torchwood Three during the end of the 19th and early 20th centuries. She appears in flashback sequences in “Fragments” and “Exit Wounds”, in 1899 and 1901 respectively, both from Jack's point of view. She holds the aggressive attitudes of Torchwood at the time, killing a Blowfish in cold blood in “Fragments”, her moral justification being that it was "a threat to the Empire”. In "Exit Wounds" she and fellow Torchwood employee Charles Gaskell (Cornelius Macarthy) discover Jack Harkness buried in Cardiff, and freeze him in the cryogenic area of the Hub. According to the Torchwood website, she is one of the notable employees whose bodies are stored in the cryogenics area. A diary extract on the website also expands on Guppy's backstory: recruited by later partner Emily Holroyd, she had been put in jail for attacking another woman in a laundry room. Holroyd explained that Guppy had been selected because "the skills [she] had demonstrated as a thief would be put to better use in espionage; not only [her] stealth, but [her] attitude towards violence."

=== Children of Earth (2009) ===
==== Alice Carter ====
Alice Carter (née Melissa Moretti; previously Sangster), played by Lucy Cohu, is the daughter of Jack Harkness, born in 1975. Alice's birth name was Melissa Moretti, but she was placed under deep cover in 1977. Her precise history is unclear, but her mother died in 2006 and she is aware of her father's immortality, which she has not inherited. Her 10-year-old son, Steven Carter (Bear McCausland) is unaware that Jack is his grandfather, instead believing Jack to be his uncle. Although their relationship appears affectionate to a degree, Jack and Alice rarely have contact as Alice dislikes his work and the reminder that he will outlive her. When Jack attempts to use Steven for his Torchwood investigation, Alice refuses. After she and Steven are used as hostages to prevent Jack interfering, she convinces the black ops team holding her prisoner to break Jack out of prison to enlist his aid in defeating the 456. Jack uses Steven to kill the 456 by using him to transmit a resonance frequency that disrupts the wavelength-based 456. Jack knew that Steven would die but had no other option; Alice's relationship with her father completely disintegrates.

==== Rhiannon Davies ====
Rhiannon Davies, portrayed by Katy Wix, is the sister of Ianto Jones, who lives with her husband Johnny (Rhodri Lewis) and children Mica and David. Rhiannon and Ianto became distant after the death of their father, although Ianto visits her in an attempt to gain access to Mica so he can analyze the cause of the synchronized chanting affecting the world's children. Rhiannon refuses to let Mica go out of parental concern and sidetracks Ianto by taking an interest in his romantic relationship with Jack Harkness. Rhiannon's house is put under surveillance after the government attempt to assassinate the Torchwood team, although Rhiannon later sneaks out of her house and supplies Ianto with Johnny's car and a laptop so that he can rescue Captain Jack. Once the schools are closed on the third day of the crisis she starts looking after neighborhood children, with husband Johnny charging "ten quid a kid". Ianto contacts her before facing the 456 and tells her that the government cannot be trusted. After Ianto dies, Rhiannon is visited in person by Gwen Cooper who explains Ianto's demise to her. Rhiannon is distraught but follows Ianto's final instructions and with the help of Gwen and Rhys takes the neighborhood children on the run from the army.

==== Mr. Dekker ====
Mr. Dekker, played by Ian Gelder, appears as an engineer and head of Technology for MI5 who has researched transmissions from "the 456" since they were first received. In the first episode, he identifies with John Frobisher as "the cockroaches of government," non-elected civil servants, who remain despite the fickleness of electoral tastes. When asked by Frobisher if he has any family, Dekker says he's always been too preoccupied with work. Dekker survives the gas attack in the Thames Building (which kills many members of MI5) by pulling on a biohazard suit in the nick of time, a success facilitated in part by the fact that he makes no attempt to save others. When his survival is pointed out by Colonel Oduya (Charles Abomeli), Dekker states that he managed it by simply standing back—"a strategy that's worked all my life."

He is abducted from his lab in the Thames Building by Agent Johnson's mutinying forces, along with Jack, and brought to a temporary HQ, where he halfheartedly assists Jack in assembling the transmission equipment necessary to combat the 456. He is shot in the leg by Agent Johnson in a presumed moment of frustration in response to his immediate pessimism about opposing the 456. Dekker shows greater willingness to assist actively with the project upon being reminded of the most recent and unprecedented transmission from the 456—the squeal that killed Clement MacDonald, which Jack presumes can be played back against them. He and Jack realize simultaneously that the only way to transmit this will be through a child—killing it in the process. Dekker, not aware that the only child available to them is Jack's own grandson, Steven, at first seems excited by this prospect—"Centre of the resonance—that kid's gonna fry!" but looks disgusted upon witnessing the event.

==== John Frobisher ====
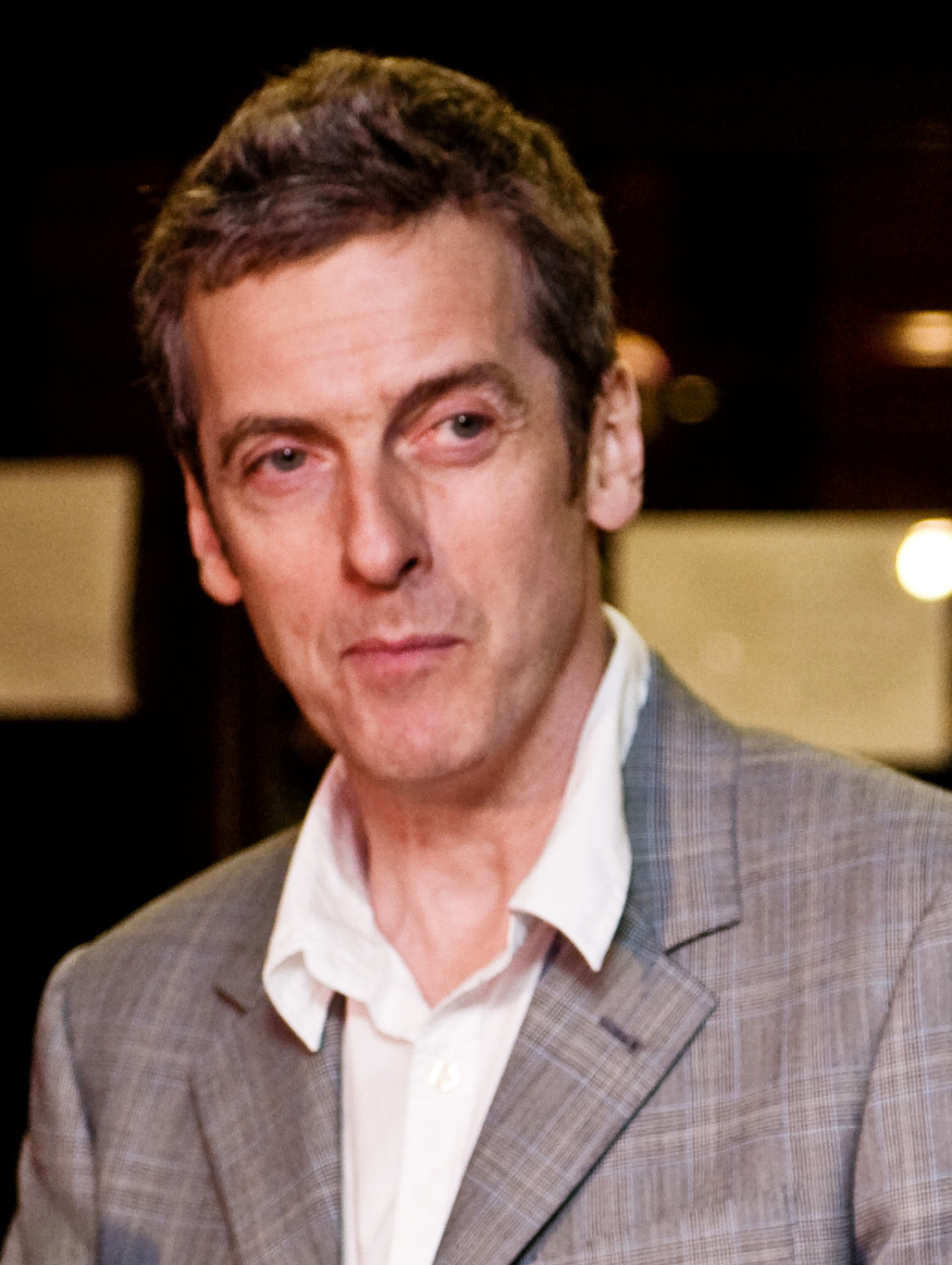
Peter Capaldi played Frobisher

John Frobisher, played by Peter Capaldi, is introduced as Permanent Secretary to the Home Office and the civil servant placed in charge of the 456 incident. Frobisher has a wife, Anna and two school-aged daughters, Holly and Lily, who are subconsciously delivering the 456's message among the rest of the world's children. He is assisted by Bridget Spears and Lois Habiba. After telling Bridget about the 456, he hands her a file of a blank piece of paper. Spears knows what this means and types up the names of four people to be killed; the quartet had coordinated the surrender of twelve orphans to the 456 in the year 1965, and include Jack Harkness. His job becomes increasingly difficult when all around him, including Prime Minister Brian Green, begin to shirk any responsibility for the disaster that is unfolding. He is the representative chosen to meet with the 456 and negotiate their demands, which are revealed to be a share of the world's child population.

Frobisher is ordered by the Prime Minister to publicly send his daughters off for inoculation (the cover for turning over children to the 456), to allow the government to appear just as much of a victim as the rest of the world and 'save face'. Leaving Number 10, he directs Bridget to sign for "Requisition 31" and bring it to him. The metal box contains a sidearm and a loaded magazine with which he kills his family, and himself—believing he is saving his daughters from the worse fate of being used as drugs by the 456.

John Frobisher is not to be confused with Frobisher, a shape-shifting companion of the Sixth and Seventh Doctors in various spin-off media, who prefers the shape of a penguin.

Peter Capaldi previously portrayed Lucius Caecilius Iucundus in the Doctor Who episode, "The Fires of Pompeii", and later played the Twelfth Doctor. The three characters are connected in that John Frobisher is a descendant of Lucius Caecilius Iucundas according to Doctor Who showrunner Steven Moffat, and the Twelfth Doctor subconsciously based his appearance on Lucius Caecilius Iucundus.

==== Bridget Spears ====
Bridget Spears, played by Susan Brown, appears in Children of Earth and is the personal assistant to Home Office Permanent Secretary John Frobisher and immensely devoted to him – having worked together for thirty years. She gives Lois Habiba her username and password, so Lois can assist with the overwhelming number of people calling in, but Lois uses it to find out about the Torchwood Institute and Jack Harkness. After Frobisher tells Bridget about the 456, he hands her a file of a blank piece of paper. Bridget understands what this means and types up the names of four people to be killed, one of whom is the immortal Jack Harkness. Unbeknownst to Bridget, Lois sees this email and questions her own loyalties. After Frobisher's troubling meeting with the Prime Minister, Frobisher directs Bridget to sign for "Requisition 31" and bring it to him; the metal box contains a sidearm and a loaded magazine. At the same time, Bridget signs for the Torchwood contact lenses confiscated from Lois when the latter is arrested for working with Torchwood. Bridget pays Lois a visit in her police custody cell to tell her that John Frobisher was a good man and that this should be remembered in the aftermath of what is about to happen. Later, after the 456 are defeated and the Prime Minister is ready to blame the Americans for the whole incident, Bridget reveals that Lois had told her how the Torchwood contact lenses worked, and that she had recorded everything the Prime Minister had said. Disgusted by his assertion that they were lucky to have someone else to blame for the incident, Bridget informs the Prime Minister that she is ready to reveal his involvement to the public. It is implied that this will be used to force Green from office as revenge for what he did to Frobisher as well.

==== Brian Green ====
Brian Green, played by Nicholas Farrell, is the British Prime Minister in Children of Earth. It is not known if he followed Harold Saxon (i.e., The Master) directly, or if there was an interim between their respective governments. Using Home Office Permanent Secretary John Frobisher as a scapegoat, Green initially denies any previous British involvement with the 456 in 1965, to ensure plausible security. However, during negotiations, the 456 discloses that the reason it choose the UK to land was 'off the record', exposing to the Americans, et al., that the British Government are trying to hide the previous encounter in 1965 where 12 children were given to the 456 as a 'gift' in exchange for an antivirus to a current virulent strain. On Day Four, instead of counteracting the 456, Green employs his cabinet to decide how to select the 10% of children demanded by the 456.

On Day Five, he informs John Frobisher that, for plausible deniability reasons, his children should be included in the 'gift' to the 456, which results in Frobisher then killing his family and himself to prevent the forced sacrifice of his children. After Captain Jack defeats the 456, Green still tries to protect his political ambitions, trying to blame American interference on government policy. However Bridget Spears, using the same Torchwood contact lenses used by Lois Habiba previously, threatens to expose the truth to the British public. Denise Riley, the Home Secretary, implies she is in a position to challenge Green's premiership following this.

==== Lois Habiba ====
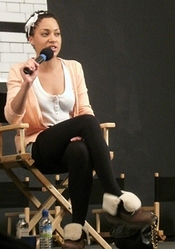
Cush Jumbo was cast as Lois Habiba, a character created to replace Martha Jones in the third series

Lois Habiba, played by Cush Jumbo, is a junior PA and assistant to Bridget Spears, who starts work at the Home Office, in John Frobisher's office, on the day the 456 make contact. Bridget gives Lois her username and password, but out of curiosity Lois uses it to find out about the Torchwood Institute and Jack Harkness after she receives a phone call from him. Bridget types an email of the names of four people to be killed, one of which is Harkness. Unbeknownst to her, Lois sees this email and starts to question her own loyalties. Lois decides to help Torchwood and after receiving a phone call from the fugitive Gwen Cooper, Lois decides to meet her. Although worried about committing treason on her second day, she gives Gwen and Rhys a way to access the prison facility where Jack is being held, and is pleased when Gwen offers her a job in the future. She also, after initially refusing, agrees to act as a spy for Torchwood, using contact lenses with integrated wireless cameras, as the seriousness of the situation has dawned on her. At this meeting she witnesses contact between Earth and the 456 and transcribes the 456's speech so Torchwood can cover the whole meeting.

Lois is present when the 456 demand 10 percent of the Earth's children and at a later cabinet meeting where she witnesses self-interested views from the cabinet over the criteria of which children should be taken by the 456 following a failed attempt at negotiation. Working on Gwen's orders, she agrees to confront the cabinet by announcing that Torchwood have recordings of everything in order to force them not to comply with the demands of the 456. She was arrested in Day Five for espionage. From prison, she helps Bridget Spears use the Torchwood contact lenses to take down PM Brian Green's administration, and it is later said she will be released from prison.

Lois' character was created by Russell T Davies to replace Martha Jones (Freema Agyeman) when they could not get her for the third series. He describes her as "kind of a Martha figure", but one who lacks Martha's experiences and is "out of her depth." Director Euros Lyn characterizes Lois as an "everygirl" and a "reluctant hero" who is conflicted between helping Torchwood and obeying the government. Lyn also compared her role in the narrative to being similar to that of Rose Tyler and Gwen Cooper, used respectively as audience surrogates on Doctor Who and Torchwood.

==== Johnson ====
Johnson
- Torchwood character
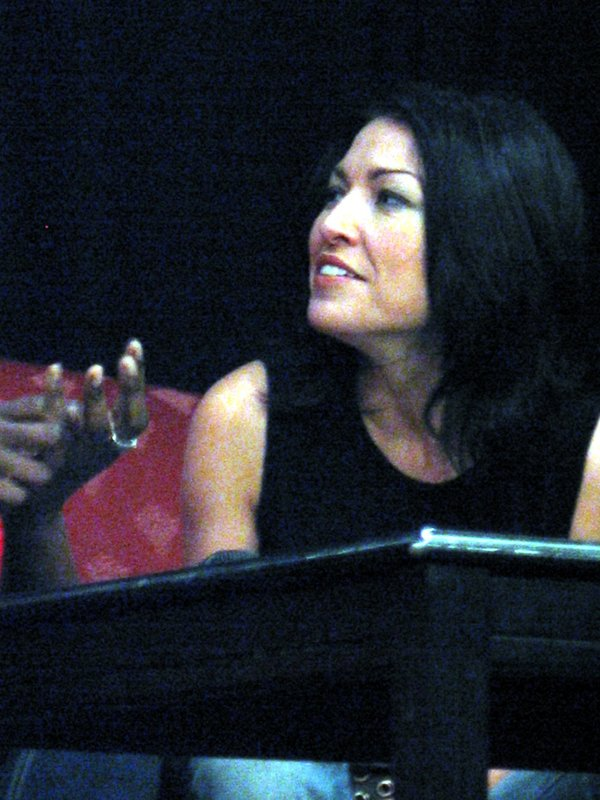
- Portrayed by: Liz May Brice

In-universe information
- Affiliation: UK Government; Rupesh Patanjali
- Appears in: Children of Earth

Johnson, portrayed by Liz May Brice, is the leader of a team of enforcers for the Government, assigned by John Frobisher to the job of dealing with Torchwood at the start of the 456 crisis. Ruthless and efficient, she has little time for social niceties and is determined to see her job done efficiently and successfully. After killing Jack by shooting him in the back, knowing he would resurrect, she uses a laser cutter to plant a bomb inside his stomach. She has no qualms about killing Dr Rupesh Patanjali, after refusing him a change of identity. Johnson detonates the bomb inside Jack, initiating the destruction of the Torchwood Hub. She later tracks down a fugitive Gwen; but Gwen shoots down her tyres and escapes. After Johnson's team uncovers several parts of Jack's severed body, she realizes his body is still able to heal and detains him in a concrete-filled cell. After Gwen and Ianto break Jack out of his concrete cell she detains Alice and Steven Carter as insurance against Harkness going public with information on the 456. When the location of the regrouped Torchwood team is discovered by Johnson's team she moves in to confront them. However, when Gwen shows her recordings of government treachery, she backs down. In the final episode she questions her allegiance to the state in wake of its betrayal and at the prompting of Alice Carter, releases Jack Harkness from custody to fight the aliens. With the help of Johnson and Dekker, Jack is able to devise a way to defeat the 456, but it requires the sacrifice of his grandson. Despite her cold and callous nature, Johnson is genuinely horrified by Steven's brutal death.

==== Clement MacDonald ====
Clement MacDonald, played by Paul Copley and as a child by Gregory Ferguson, appears in Children of Earth. In 1965, Clement is one of the twelve children offered to the 456, but he is left behind and keeps a mental link to the 456 when they return forty years later. He has somehow acquired clairalience, a highly enhanced sense of smell, allowing him to detect the impending return of the 456 months before the events shown in the story, as well as other threats and also to determine that Gwen Cooper is pregnant and that Ianto Jones is "queer". After spending much of his life in care under the name Timothy White, traumatized and wracked with tics, Clement comes to Torchwood's attention when he is the only adult relaying the messages from the 456 in unison with the children. Escaping from the care home when the police arrives for him, he is initially arrested for causing an affray in his confused state, but is retrieved by Gwen Cooper. He then meets Jack Harkness, and recognizes him as the man who escorted the twelve children to the 456 decades earlier. Clement is killed by the 456 when they transmit a resonance frequency that damages his brain; Harkness is later able to reverse this frequency and use it against the 456.

==== Rupesh Patanjali ====
Rupesh Patanjali, played by Rik Makarem, is a Cardiff doctor, originally from Chesterfield. He first encounters Jack Harkness and Ianto Jones when they arrive at the hospital to remove an alien hitchhiker from a recently deceased patient. His interest in Torchwood piqued, Rupesh makes his way to the Cardiff Hub. Gwen Cooper, noting a parallel between Torchwood's treatment of Rupesh and their initial treatment of her, promotes herself to recruitment officer and meets with Patanjali to discuss the possibility of a job. Patanjali's interest in the job is later revealed to be a façade. After luring Harkness back to St. Helen's hospital with a report of a strange death, he turns on him and shoots him in the back, "killing" him. It is revealed that Patanjali was working on the orders of Johnson who decided to plant a bomb in Harkness to wipe out the Torchwood operation. Johnson rebuked Patanjali when he expressed discomfort over Harkness' death by pointing out that he had killed a patient in order to facilitate the ruse which lured Harkness to her. After enquiring what was to become of him, Patanjali realises that Johnson plans to dispose of him. As he flees, he is shot in the back. In order to rescue Jack, Gwen and Rhys pose as undertakers seeking to reclaim Rupesh's body on behalf of his family.

==== Denise Riley ====
Denise Riley, played by Deborah Findlay, appears in Children of Earth and is the British home secretary. She first appears in Day Four, where she suggests handing over the lowest achieving 10% of children to The 456. Nobody disagrees with her choice, and so it goes ahead. When Jack Harkness, Johnson and Mr. Dekker killed the 456, she witnessed Brian Green say he was "lucky". Unbeknownst to Riley, Bridget Spears had continued Lois's work in recording the COBRA meetings. After this, she told Bridget that she was free to go, and that she will see to Lois's release. It is implied that she took over the position of Prime Minister.

==== Johnny Davies ====
Johnny Davies, played by Rhodri Lewis, was the husband of Rhiannon and the father of David and Mica. He was devastated when Gwen Cooper told them that their children would be taken, so he led a rebellion on the street, and bought Rhiannon, Gwen and Rhys time to escape to a small dilapidated shack. He was glad when his children were not harmed, but was devastated by Ianto's death.

=== Miracle Day (2011) ===
==== Vera Juarez ====
Dr Vera Juarez, played by Arlene Tur, is a divorced attending surgeon in Washington D.C. who appears between "The New World" and "The Categories of Life". Press materials promoted the character as "smart, fast talking and hard working" and underline that it is these characteristics which seconded her to being part of the government think-tanks. Through her job she is amongst the first to realize the repercussions of miracle day and she finds herself increasingly at odds with the inept medical system. After establishing a sexual relationship with Rex Matheson she allies herself with his Torchwood team. However, her first undercover investigation for the group is her last; she is burned alive after dissenting against Colin Maloney.

==== Noah Vickers ====
Noah Vickers, portrayed by Paul James, is a colleague of Esther Drummond who is charged with investigating the effects Miracle Day has had on the population. When Esther's discovery of the history of Torchwood is erased from her memory it is Noah's work in retrieving the last Torchwood file which triggers them. Esther misdirects him when she is attempting to escape the CIA headquarters where they both work. Noah later appears in "End of the Road" where he makes contact with Esther and Rex Matheson who have now been pardoned by the CIA following the ousting of several traitors. In "The Blood Line", Noah initiates a trace software package that can uncover the identity of the remaining mole within the CIA. However, just as Noah, along with Allen Shapiro, discovers Charlotte's duplicity, they are killed by a bomb left by her on their desk. Rex is later able to retrieve this information through a passcode derived from where he and Noah used to have donuts together. The pair of Noah and Charlotte has attracted comparisons to Rex and Esther. Writing for TV.com, Tim Surette describes Noah as "bizarro Rex" and Charlotte as "bizarro Esther".

==== Charlotte Wills ====
Charlotte Wills
- Torchwood character
- First appearance: "The New World" (2011)
- Last appearance: "The Blood Line" (2011)
- Portrayed by: Marina Benedict

In-universe information
- Affiliation: CIA; The Three Families

Charlotte Wills, portrayed by Marina Benedict, is a colleague of Esther Drummond. In "The New World" Wills acts uninterested in Torchwood and tells Esther that all enquiries have to go through Brian Friedkin. After Esther's investigations render her a wanted woman she manages to escape the CIA compound by taking Charlotte's identity card and assuming her identity. In "End of the Road" Wills returns and talks to Rex and Esther over video link, discussing developments with the Miracle. It is later revealed that she is working as a double agent, also having contact with a mysterious blue eyed man who represents The Families. In "The Gathering", Charlotte continues to act as a mole for the Families when Rex uncovers a lead; she tries to put him off researching a pulp short story apparently based on the Little Italy incident, and tells him that a DNA test that could find descendants of the author was unsuccessful. Later, she tracks Rex to Buenos Aires – a location connected to the Blessing behind Miracle Day – when he is on a secret mission for Torchwood, and contacts the Families. She detonates a bomb in CIA headquarters just as they discover that she is a mole; the explosion kills Shapiro and Noah. Despite her efforts to sabotage the mission, Torchwood end the Miracle. While attending Esther's funeral, Rex receives information that reveals Charlotte is the mole. Charlotte turns and shoots Rex, and is in turn gunned down by Jack Harkness.

In Miracle Day episode "The Gathering", Charlotte refers to a recent break-up with an ex-girlfriend. Writing for the lesbian blogging site AfterEllen, Heather Hogan describes this additional piece of characterization as effective in reminding the audience that the Three Families are ordinary people, living alongside us.

==== Anwen Williams ====
Anwen Williams is the daughter of Gwen Cooper and Rhys Williams who makes her first television appearance in Torchwood: Miracle Day. Anwen is conceived three weeks prior to the events of Children of Earth. She spends her early months in hiding with them in the wilds of South Wales. She becomes part of a chase when assassins call on her parents' house, and Gwen is forced to fight with Anwen in her arms. In "Immortal Sins", Anwen is captured along with Rhys and Mary and used as leverage for Gwen to turn in Jack Harkness. However, the infant is later rescued by the intervention of a South Wales attack force, led by sergeant Andy Davidson. A scene in Gareth David Lloyd's Shrouded had previously depicted Gwen cradling an unnamed and ungendered baby in her arms, whilst the novel First Born, also set prior to Miracle Day, features a storyline where Anwen draws unwanted attention.

The production team originally planned to call Gwen's daughter Emily, but changed to Anwen, as the name is more Welsh. Writer Jane Espenson feels that the infant's apparent "enthusiasm for action" works in that it "actually seems to speak to Gwen's own character".

==== Jilly Kitzinger ====
Jilly Kitzinger, played by Lauren Ambrose, is a high flying PR executive with few moral scruples introduced in "Rendition". Initially, she functions as a minor distraction and adversary to the Torchwood protagonists in her role as representative for the paedophile-murderer Oswald Danes and the mysterious drug company Phicorp. Towards the end of the series she affiliates herself with 'The Families', the main villains behind the supernatural event of 'Miracle Day' and her own position becomes clear. Whilst the character appears ruthless; promoted as having a 'heart of stone' portrayer Ambrose sees her character's ambition as showing strong personal qualities too. Though those she works for are defeated in the series finale, it is revealed that Jilly has survived, leaving the character's future uncertain.

==== Lyn Peterfield ====
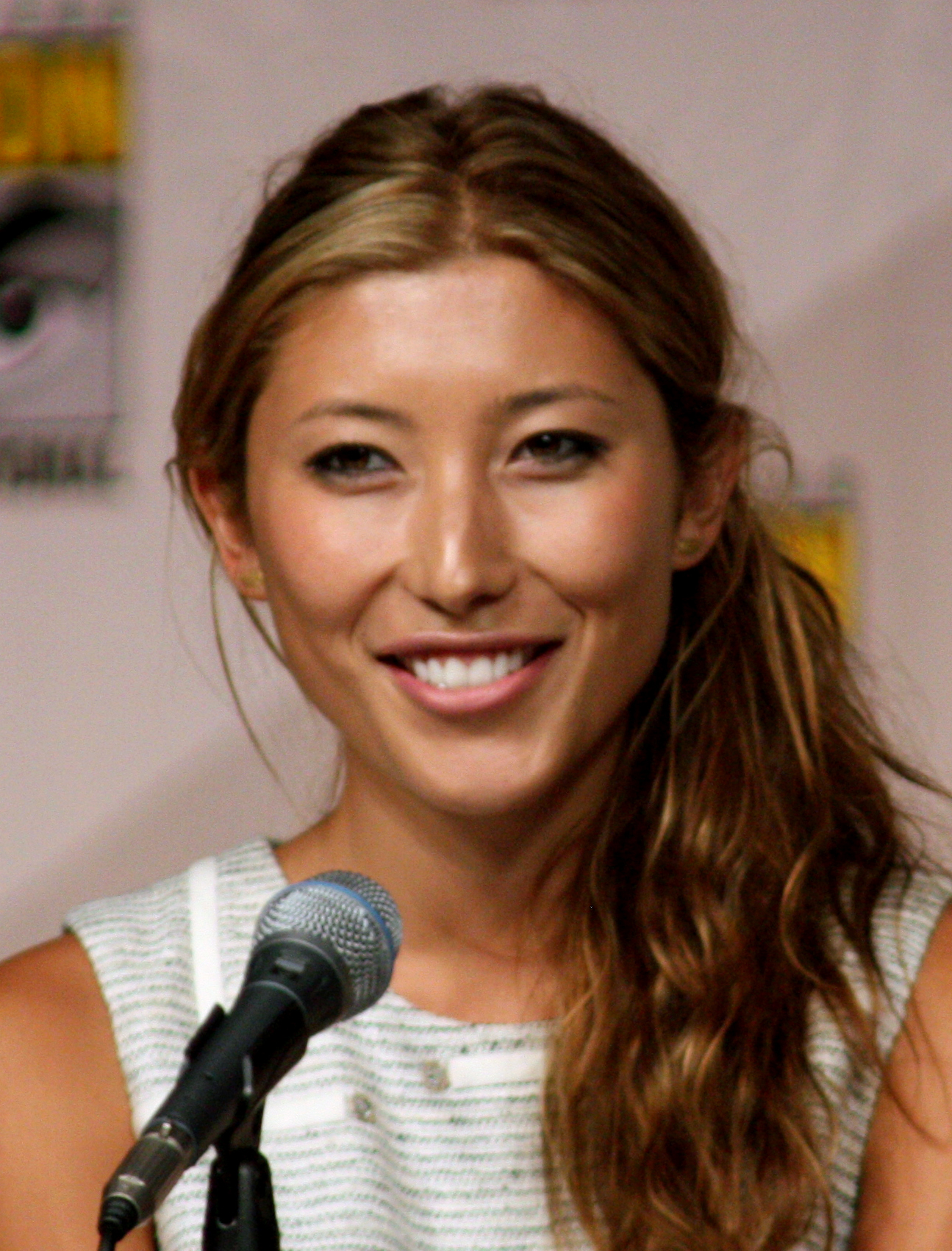
Lachman portrayed the villainous Lyn

Lyn Peterfield, portrayed by Dichen Lachman, is a CIA agent who serves as an antagonist to the Torchwood team in the episode "Rendition". It is revealed through exposition that she once had a sexual affair with Rex Matheson prior to the events of Miracle Day. Lyn is sent to help collect Jack and Gwen from Heathrow after they have been arrested by Matheson. Under the orders of Brian Friedkin, Peterfield attempts to assassinate the now mortal Jack Harkness by slipping arsenic into his cola. However, her plan is foiled when Jack identifies the poison and Gwen and Rex source an antidote. She is knocked unconscious by Gwen after insulting her capabilities and mistaking her for an Englishwoman. Once in the United States she attempts to defeat Rex in hand-to-hand combat once he realizes the treachery of the CIA. However, he gains the upper hand and breaks her neck. Due to the effect of Miracle Day she is left still alive but with her head now on back to front.

Lachman's casting as a CIA agent was reported alongside the casting of Havins as Esther in January 2011. Lachman had previously been suggested as a candidate to play Esther by End of Show writer Kevin Beaumont. Den of Geek's Simon Brew praised Lyn's villainous role, stating in his review of episode two that she was "the most menacing character we’ve met in the show so far, [Oswald] Danes included", in addition to the special effects shot of her twisted neck. Conversely, SFX's Dave Golder felt the twist involving the character at the end of the episode suffered a "case of nobody quite knowing what level to play it at."

==== Brian Friedkin ====
Brian Friedkin
- Torchwood character
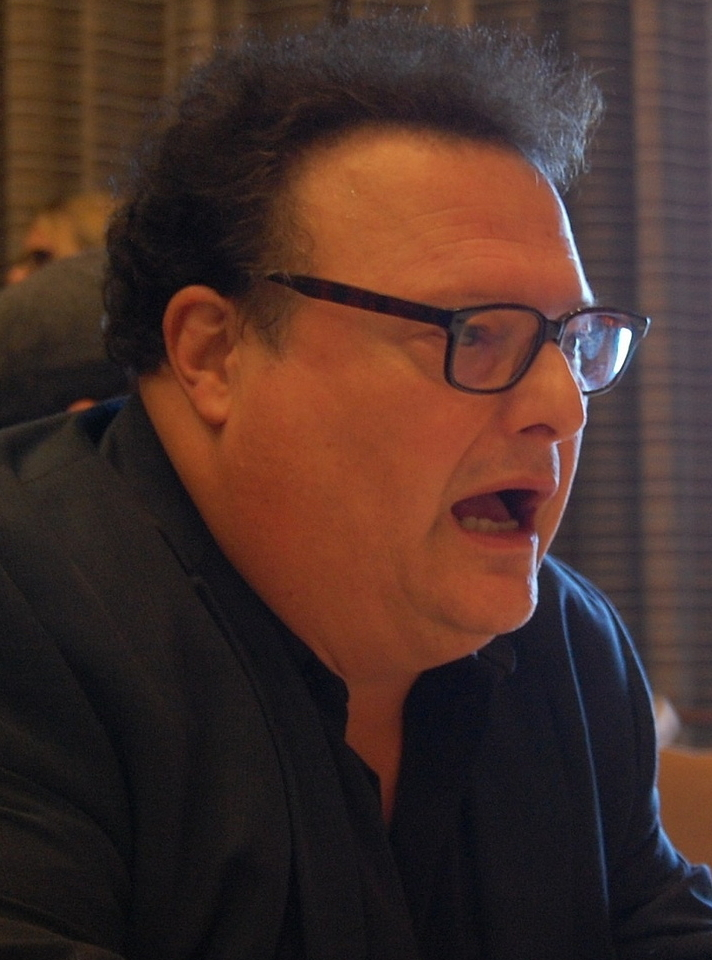
- First appearance: "Rendition" (2011)
- Last appearance: "End of the Road" (2011)
- Portrayed by: Wayne Knight

In-universe information
- Affiliation: CIA; The Three Families

Brian Friedkin, played by Wayne Knight, is a high-ranking officer in the CIA and Esther and Rex's boss. After Miracle Day, Esther mentions that she has liaised with Rex over Torchwood's rendition to the United States. Upon learning that his agent Lyn Peterfield has a mortal Jack Harkness he orders Lyn to kill him, which she attempts to do by arsenic poisoning. He has been receiving messages from a mysterious unknown source represented by a triangle symbol for decades. Friedkin later arranges for Esther Drummond and Rex Matheson to be set up in his attempt to not only get rid of Torchwood, but anyone associated with the defunct organisation. The two escape, and Rex later confronts Friedkin at his Washington DC home. Rex takes Friedkins phone and is informed that whoever has been contacting Friedkin has been on Earth for decades. Rex later shoots next to Friedkin's head, warning him not to go deaf from the gunshot. Friedkin captures the Torchwood crew at the Colasanto estate but Rex secretly puts on Gwen's transmitter lenses and tricks Friedkin into confessing his work for the Families. Friedkin is arrested by his boss, Allen Shapiro. He blows himself up upon his capture, as The Families had ordered him to do, destroying himself, one of his agents and Olivia Colasanto.

==== Brad ====
Brad, played by Dillon Casey, is a Washington bartender. He appears in the episode "Dead of Night" when Jack Harkness visits the bar he works at. Brad takes pride in the amount of sobriety chips that have been cashed in subsequent to the miracle noting that people have turned to alcohol in response to worldwide immortality. When Jack offers a button to the collection, Brad is adamant that he does not damage his World War Two great-coat. The two men leave the bar with the intention of a one-night stand. Though Brad does not see the use in using protection because no-one can die, Jack calls him out on this noting that a sexually transmitted infection could still cause problems. He is later seen asleep next to Jack whilst Jack nurses a whisky and phones Gwen.

One of the scenes between Jack and Brad was censored in the UK airing of the show, having been deemed too explicit for a prime-time audience. However, the sequence remained in its entirety in the Starz broadcast of the episode. Jane Espenson, who wrote the episode, commented that the sexual encounter between the two men was Jack's method of "affirming life".

==== Sarah Drummond ====
Sarah Drummond, portrayed by Candace Brown, is the sister of Esther Drummond. In the episode "Dead of Night", Esther states that whilst Sarah is older she has always had the task of looking after her because she can't cope. In "Escape to L.A." Esther checks up on Sarah to see how she is coping in the aftermath of the Miracle. Sarah refuses to answer the door, which is barricaded with a number of different locks. Esther fears for Sarah's two young daughters, Melanie and Alice, as Sarah is hypochondriac and will not let them leave the house. It revealed that social services arrive and take Melanie and Alice into care, whilst Sarah undergoes psychiatric evaluation. In "End of the Road" Esther speaks to Sarah who is still located in the psychiatric ward under strict supervision from Doctors. She expresses the opinion that people in the new world no longer have souls, and appears eager to volunteer herself and her children to become category one—effectively committing suicide. Her reaction to the state of affairs motivates Esther to do her utmost to put an end to the Miracle. Post Miracle, Sarah is seen alive and well with her children at Esther's memorial service.

==== Ellis Hartley Monroe ====
Ellis Hartley Monroe, portrayed by Mare Winningham, is a fictional American politician and Tea Party movement Republican who appears in the episode "Escape to L.A." as a rival to Oswald Danes. Monroe is described by medical professional Vera Juarez as a small town mayor connected to the Tea Party who was "trying to make a name for herself". She does this by launching the controversial "Dead is Dead" movement, which believes that those who should have died during Miracle Day are no better than corpses. Her strong views and personality soon propel her to national attention. She momentarily eclipses Danes' public notoriety, stealing one of his engagements. In retaliation, Danes launches a publicity stunt at the hospital at which he was supposed to speak, which deflects attention from Monroe. She is later kidnapped by the forces behind Miracle Day, who inform her that they already have Danes and don't need her. She is trapped inside a crushed car and abandoned in a car lot, still alive within the wreckage of the car due to the effects of the Miracle. After her "death", a statement goes out on TV advising the public that Monroe will not be available to comment on the latest developments.

==== The Cousin ====
The Cousin, played by Chris Butler, is a high-ranking member of the Three Families and oversees the Buenos Aires Blessing site. In "Escape to L.A." he speaks to Ellis Hartley Monroe over the phone as her car is crushed by a car compactor—with her inside. He appears physically in "The Blood Line". When Rex Matheson and Esther Drummond reach the Buenos Aires site, they are captured by the Cousin's men, and he speaks to them and to Jack Harkness, Gwen Cooper, Oswald Danes, Jilly Kitzinger and the leader of the Shanghai site over the phone. When Jack and Rex prepare to sacrifice all their blood to end the Miracle, the Cousin shoots Esther, reminding Rex that if the Miracle ends, she will die. However Gwen convinces Rex to go ahead, and he and Jack end the Miracle. As both Blessing sites start to fall apart, Rex uses the last of his strength to throw the Cousin into the Blessing, and he falls to his death.

==== Colin Maloney ====
Colin Maloney, played by American actor Marc Vann, appears as in "The Categories of Life" and "The Middle Men" as manager of the San Pedro overflow camp in California. Maloney is encountered by agents Esther Drummond and Vera Juarez when they go undercover at the camp. Vera uses her medical panel credentials to pose as an inspector, though because of her race Maloney mistakes her for hired help. Despite Vera pointing out the harsh realities of the situation, Maloney appears to have no sympathy for the patients within the overflow camp, openly taunting a patient named George and excited for a visit from Hilary Duff rather than Hillary Clinton. After Vera realises the appalling, cramped and disease-ridden conditions the patients are in and instances of miscategorization on Maloney's watch, she threatens to prosecute him because of his negligence. Maloney defends himself on how he comes in under budget despite the fact he's meant to spend the money given to him and seems over his head dealing with the situation. After a heated argument, he takes a gun from a camp guard, Ralph Coltrane (Frederick Koehler), and shoots Vera twice . He covers up the shooting by masking it as the sound of a loud metal door clanging. Maloney disposes of Vera's body by burning her alive in one of the overflow camp modules, along with many category one patients who are still physically alive but legally dead.

In "The Middle Men", Maloney, acting out of guilt and panic, continues to disguise his involvement in Vera's death, attributing his change of shirt to a strenuous badminton match. Esther is alerted to some sort of wrongdoing by his suspicious behavior, but her attempts at gaining insight are thwarted by the dismissal of her approaches by him and other bureaucrats. When Rex is captured by the military contingent of the camp, Maloney visits him to ascertain what he knows. After Rex explains what he saw to Maloney, Maloney reveals his part in the incident. When Rex, like Vera, attempts to threaten him with prosecution on grounds of crimes against humanity, Maloney begins to torture Rex by probing his chest wound with a biro pen. When Esther finds them and discovers the Maloney's treachery he aims to kill her in unarmed combat. Esther fights back by gouging his eyes and using physical blows to wind him before choking him. Later, when Esther goes to retrieve his keys, Maloney recovers and attempts to kill her once more. Ralph, appalled at Maloney's actions, arrives in time to shoot Maloney, disabling him again and allowing Rex and Esther to escape the San Pedro camp.

==== Blue-eyed Man ====
American actor Teddy Sears played a representative of Torchwood's enemies, the Three Families, credited only as Blue-eyed man. He first appears in "The Categories of Life" where he informs Jilly Kitzinger that her work with Phicorp and Oswald Danes has got her noticed by the right people. After Danes and Kitzinger part company in "End of the Road", the blue-eyed man reappears and informs Kitzinger that her intern is a traitor and shoots her dead. He then offers Kitzinger a promotion working with The Families at a level beyond Phicorp. Two months later, he meets Kitzinger on a park bench and tells her that her work has been appreciated. He gives her a new identity, Lucy Statten Meredith, and informs her that she will be sent to Shanghai where she can see the truth behind the Miracle. In "The Blood Line", after the Miracle ends, Kitzinger tracks down the blue-eyed man at the park they met previously. He informs her that the Three Families intended the miracle as a "test-run" and that they have a Plan B which they are waiting to orchestrate.

==== Angelo Colasanto ====
Angelo Colasanto, portrayed by Italian actor Daniele Favilli, is introduced in "Immortal Sins". Angelo was raised as Catholic and was raised in a coastal Italian Village. He attempts to enter America via Ellis Island by stealing the visa of Jack Harkness, but is locked up and prepared to be deported back to Italy. Empathizing with Angelo, Jack uses his Vortex Manipulator to forge a new identity slip so he can enter America. They then rent a room together in New York's Italian district where Jack seduces Angelo. Angelo is conflicted between his faith and sexuality; though Jack is not the first man he has slept with, he is the first to show tenderness to him. With Jack, Angelo becomes part of a plan to make money by selling sacramental wine. Almost immediately after obtaining the alcohol they are kidnapped. Instead of being killed, however, Jack convinces their captors to allow them to work for them, and were asked to transport a box between two warehouses. After convincing Jack he could cope with seeing new things, Jack decided to make Angelo his companion in the same way that the Doctor had enlisted Jack as companion. At the warehouse, Jack opened the box to reveal a brain parasite that the Trickster's Brigade were planning to use on future President Franklin Delano Roosevelt, which he destroys. The two men flee, but Jack is shot and Angelo arrested.

A year later Angelo is released from prison and is shocked to find that Jack is alive when he should be dead. Jack informs him that he has obtained the same room from the previous year and invites Angelo back with him. Angelo conjectures that because he cannot die Jack is an embodiment of the devil, and stabs him. When Jack revives again, Angelo allows him to be taken to a butcher's shop where a crowd of people repeatedly kill him. Later, Angelo frees Jack and expresses remorse. However, Jack no longer trusts Angelo, and abandons him. In 2011 it is revealed that Angelo is still alive and possess knowledge of how the Miracle started. Thanks to Jack's warnings of the economic hard times of the future – including the Wall Street crash of 1929 – Angelo managed to become wealthy, and lived in a mansion in Nevada. He is revealed to have allied with "the Families", a group formed by a pact between three mobsters in 1928 while Jack was being repeatedly murdered and resurrected, but his connection to the Families soured because they frowned on Angelo's relationship with Jack – a relationship he remembered fondly even after marrying and having children. Shortly after the Torchwood team arrived at the Colasanto estate, as Jack was saying goodbye to his former lover, Angelo suddenly dies—the first true death since Miracle Day. It is discovered that Angelo had salvaged an alien null-field generator from the ruins of the Torchwood Hub in Cardiff, and had it installed beneath his bed. The null field disrupted the morphic field that Jack theorized was responsible for the Miracle in that one location, allowing Angelo to die naturally.

==== Olivia Colasanto ====
Olivia Colasanto, portrayed by Nana Visitor, is the granddaughter of Angelo Colasanto, who first appears in the episode "Immortal Sins". Olivia is involved in the plot to kidnap Gwen Cooper's family to force her to hand over Captain Jack Harkness. Upon Rex Matheson and Esther Drummond foiling her appropriation of Jack, and Sergeant Davidson rescuing Gwen's family, Olivia reveals her trump card – that Jack will still come with her as she can bring him to Angelo and thus enlighten him to how the Miracle started. Episode eight, "End of the Road" begins with Olivia bringing Jack and his Torchwood associates to the Colorado mansion where she lives with her grandfather Angelo, now a decrepit old man in a semi-vegetative state. Olivia states that although Angelo loved his wife, he never forgot about Jack, and would often tell stories about him. She also reveals that a disharmony arose between Angelo and the families because of Angelo's relationship with Jack, and makes clear the connection of the three families to the Miracle. After agent Shapiro arrives and places the rogue contingent of the CIA under arrest Olivia is also arrested and placed in a SUV vehicle ready for transportation. However, she is blown up by controller Brian Friedkin after he detonates an explosive device as he was ordered to do by the families.

==== Allen Shapiro ====
Allen Shapiro
- Torchwood character
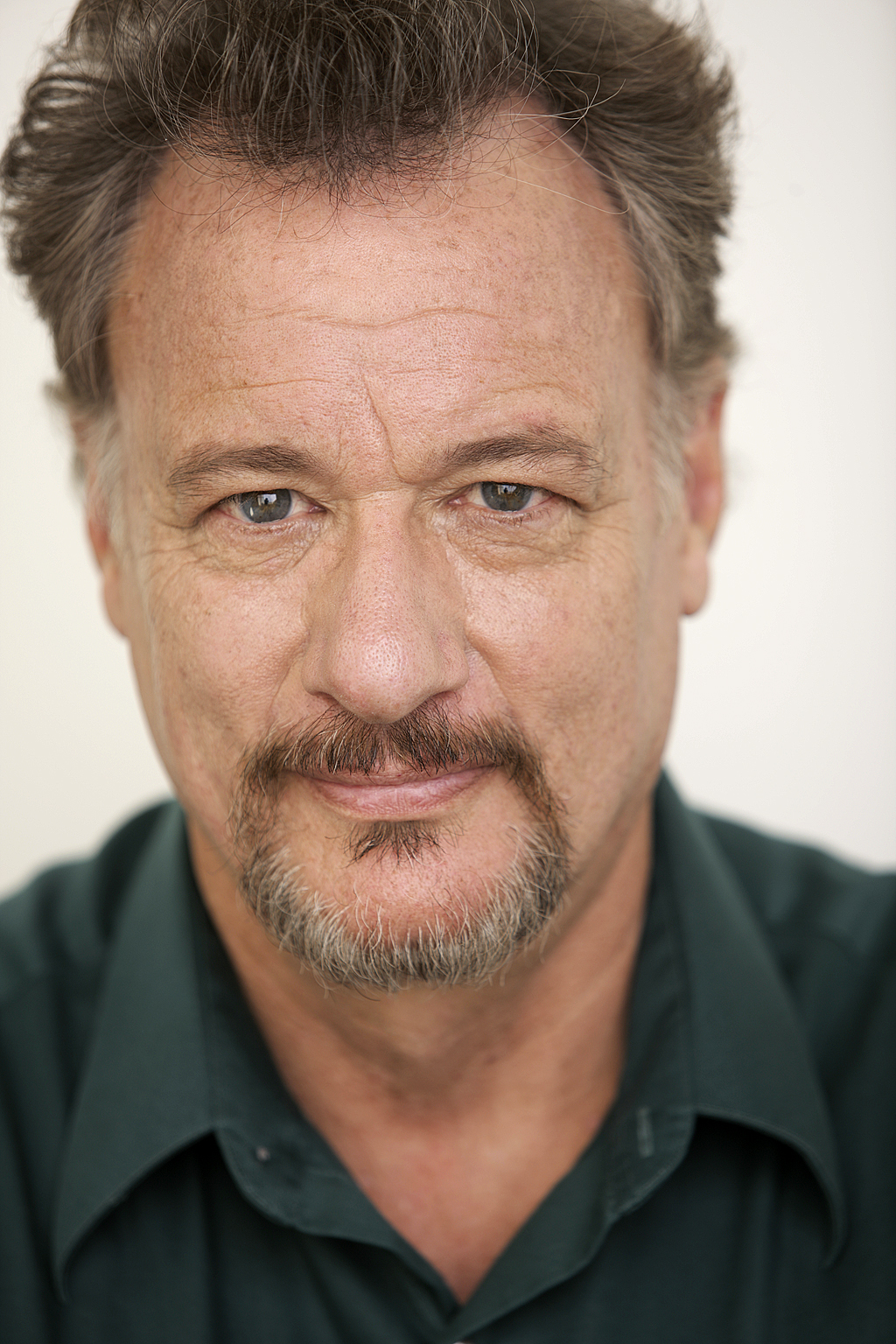
- First appearance: "End of the Road" (2011)
- Last appearance: "The Blood Line" (2011)
- Portrayed by: John de Lancie

In-universe information
- Affiliation: CIA; Torchwood Institute

Allen Shapiro (John de Lancie) is introduced in the episode "End of the Road" as a senior CIA official. After Rex Matheson frames a rebel contingent of the CIA led by Brian Friedkin through use of the Torchwood contact lenses, Shapiro puts them under arrest along with Olivia Colasanto. He is enraged after Friedkin escapes questioning by blowing himself and the other captors to pieces. Though he pardons Rex and Esther, he remains suspicious of Jack and Gwen, and deports the latter, whilst trying to find out the secrets of a piece of Torchwood technology Jack wants to remain secret. Esther and Jack later escape, whilst Matheson reunites with Shapiro at the CIA central office in Washington.

Two months after "End of the Road, Shapiro is still working with Rex to try and discover the secrets behind the Miracle. Despite identifying some traitors within the organisation, Shapiro remains oblivious to the identity of a further mole within the organisation, namely analyst Charlotte Wills, who is covertly working for the Families against the investigation. Shapiro authorises Rex to head to Argentina to investigate what, after getting in Torchwood, he believes to be an antipodal geological connection between Shanghai and Buenos Aires. Shapiro then tells his CIA colleagues to support Rex from Washington. However, Charlotte gets in touch with the Argentinian armed forces and they cause an explosion which Shapiro believes has killed Rex and colleague Esther. Furious, he orders Noah Vickers to rush through a use of new programming which can detect the presence of a mole by unscrambling all communications. Just as they discover Charlotte's duplicity, Shapiro and Noah are blown up by a bomb placed by Charlotte.

==== The Mother ====
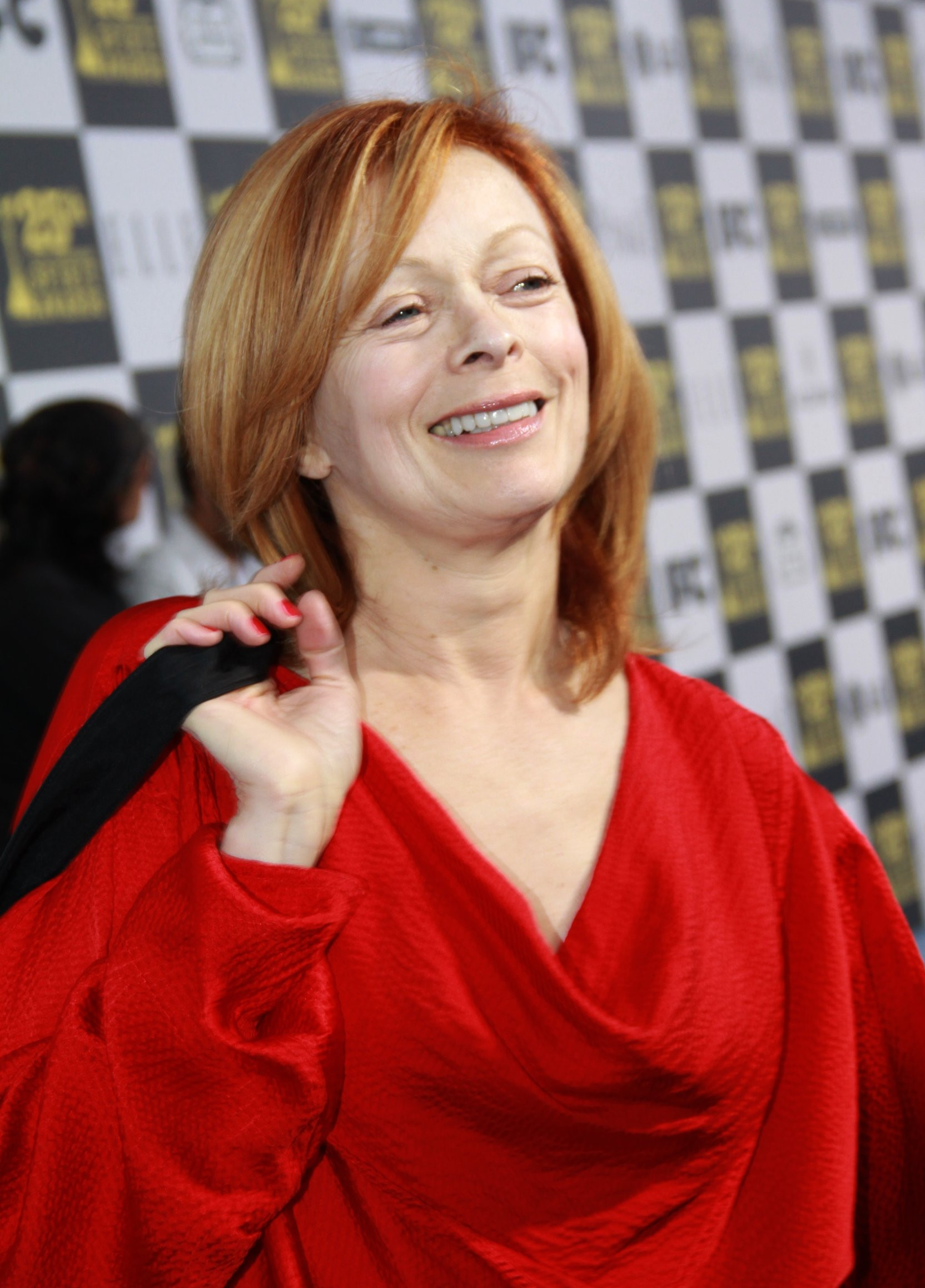
Frances Fisher played the power-seeking 'Mother' in two episodes.

The Mother, portrayed by actress Frances Fisher, appears as a high-ranking member of the Families, the main antagonists of Miracle Day. She operates the Shanghai site of the Blessing, a giant fissure running through the centre of the Earth between Shanghai and Buenos Aires. In "The Gathering", the Mother meets with the Families' newest recruit, Jilly Kitzinger, after she arrives in Shanghai, and introduces her to the Blessing. She tells Jilly that the Blessing "shows you to yourself" which she theorises is the Blessing's attempt to communicate with mankind. She enquires as to what Jilly sees in the Blessing, and appears impressed when Jilly sees only self-conviction.

In "The Blood Line", the Mother reveals to Jilly that the Families intend to destroy the Blessing sites in Shanghai and Buenos Aires in order to prevent others from interfering with it, and dictates orders to have explosives placed round the site. However, Jack, Gwen and Oswald are able to infiltrate the site before they can do this. The Mother explains that Jack's blood is attracted to the Blessing as a result of the Families having fed his blood to it, and that this, in combination with humanity's morphic field, caused the human race to become immortal. She details the motives of the Families, who are intent on destabilising the human race so that they can take control and create a new world order. Realising that releasing his blood will reverse the Miracle, Jack threatens to do so, but the Mother laughs off this effort: Jack's blood would have to enter the Blessing from both ends. Her triumph is cut short when Rex, at the Buenos Aires site, reveals that Esther had transfused him with Jack's blood. As Rex and Jack release the blood into the Blessing, the site begins to quake, prompting the Families to evacuate. While Gwen, Jilly and Jack escape in a cargo lift, the Mother attempts to flee, but Oswald grabs her before detonating his explosive vest, bringing the whole site crashing down on top of them.

Espenson identifies The Mother as part of an "intentionally multiple array of human villains" which serves to demonstrate that the series "isn't a story about a singular point of evil" but "a collective evil of humanity". The character is seen to speak fluent Mandarin Chinese; an aide was available on set to guide Fisher's pronunciation.

== See also ==
- List of Torchwood monsters and aliens
- List of Doctor Who supporting characters
- List of Doctor Who villains
- List of The Sarah Jane Adventures minor characters
