= Eric Steinberg =

American actor

- Born: Washington, D.C., U.S.
- Occupation: Actor
- Years active: 1992–present

Eric D. Steinberg is an American actor. He starred in the Freeform series Pretty Little Liars.

== Personal life ==
Steinberg was born in Washington, D.C. to a Korean mother and to a Jewish father. He attended the University of Vermont and the University of Kent prior to receiving an acting fellowship at the University of California, Irvine.

== Career ==
Steinberg had a minor role for Rage of Vengeance. His television credits include JAG, NCIS, CSI: Crime Scene Investigation, Star Trek: Voyager, CSI: Miami, Without a Trace, Zeke and Luther and Martin. From 2006 to 2007, he played Ji Min Kim in The Young and the Restless and Netan in Stargate SG-1. He voiced Lord Shimura in Ghost of Tsushima.

== Filmography ==
=== Film ===
Year	Title	Role	Notes
1993	Rage of Vengeance	Sunghi	
1996	Star Trek: First Contact	Lieutenant Paul Porter	
1997	Dog Watch	Bench	Direct-to-video

=== Television ===
Year	Title	Role	Notes
1996	Babylon 5	Samuel	Episode: "Exogenesis"
1996	Dark Skies	Reverend Gary Barrow	Episode: "Ancient Future"
1998	JAG	Tony Yoshigawa	Episode: "With Intent to Die"
1999	Star Trek: Voyager	Ankari	Episode: "Equinox: Part II"
2006–2007	Stargate SG-1	Netan	5 episodes
2006–2007	The Young and the Restless	Ji Min Kim	54 episodes
2006–2007	Day Break	Slim / Danny Yan	Episodes: "What If He Can Change the Day?" and "What If They're Connected?"
2008	Terminator: The Sarah Connor Chronicles	Alex Akagi	Episode: "Strange Things Happen at the One Two Point"
2008	Inseparable	Lon Cho	Television movie
2010–2011	Days of Our Lives	Dr. Kim	8 episodes
2010–2014	Pretty Little Liars	Colonel Wayne Fields	9 episodes
2011	Zeke and Luther	Mr. Montoya	Episode: "Ice Heist, Baby"
2011	Torchwood	Zheng Yibao	Episode: "The Middle Men"
2012	The Mentalist	Jon Musashi	Episode: "His Thoughts Were Red Thoughts"
2012	CSI: Crime Scene Investigation	Eric Louie	Episode: "CSI on Fire"
2013	Mortal Kombat Legacy	Sub Zero / Bi Han	4 episodes
2014	Anger Management	Dr. Woo	Episode: "Charlie and the Temper of Doom"
2015	Satisfaction		Episode: "Through Struggle"
2015	Supergirl	Commander Gor	Episodes: "Stronger Together" and "Hostile Takeover"
2016	Lab Rats: Elite Force	Rodissius	Episodes: "The List" and "The Attack"
2018	The Fosters	Professor Kim	3 episodes
2018	Hawaii Five-0	Captain Keo	Episodes: "The Man Who Fell From the Sky" and "Nothing More the Eyes to Search For"
2019	SEAL Team	Captain Urbano	Episode: "Rock Bottom"
2021	Coyote	HSI Agent	Episode: "Plaza De Nada"

- Martin (1997, TV series) - Mr. Ho
- Yellow (1998) - Peter
- V.I.P. (1998, TV series) - Prince Jordan
- Largo (2000) - Nick Ramirez
- True Vinyl (2004) - Morita
- CSI: Miami (2005, TV series) - Daniel Vance
- Charmed (2005) - The Dogan
- NCIS (2005, TV series) - Marcos Siazon
- 24 (2006, TV series) - Agent Davis
- Nip/Tuck (2006, TV series) - Dr. Mugavi
- Numbers (2006, TV series) - ATF Agent Rho
- The Unit (2007, TV series) - General Raja
- Without a Trace (2007, TV series) - Ray Greene
- Finding Madison (2008) - Holden Stay
- Second Chance (2016, TV series) - Cory

=== Video games ===
Year	Title	Role	Notes
2020	Ghost of Tsushima	Lord Shimura (voice)	Also motion capture
