= Candace Brown =

American actress and comedian

- Born: June 15, 1980 (age 45); Culver City, California, U.S.
- Occupation: Film/Television actress
- Years active: 1995–present

Candace Dean Brown (born June 15, 1980) is an American actress and comedian best known for her work on shows such as Grey's Anatomy, Desperate Housewives, Head Case, and Wizards Of Waverly Place. In 2011, she joined the guest cast for Torchwood's fourth series' Torchwood: Miracle Day, airing on BBC One in the United Kingdom and premium television network Starz.

== Early years ==
Brown was born in Culver City, California, and was raised in the Los Angeles suburb of Glendale by her mother. She attended Glendale High School in Glendale and later attended California State University, Northridge to study communications. She studied acting under the acting teacher, Ivana Chubbuck. She is an alum of The Groundlings Theater in Los Angeles where she was a member of the Sunday Company alongside Kristen Wiig and Mikey Day.

== Career ==
Brown made her first appearance on TV in 1995, on the Fox television show Party Of Five. She made her feature film debut in the 2003 comedy The Cat In The Hat, as the secretary at the Humberfloob Real Estate Office. Brown has appeared in numerous television shows. In 2007, she was cast as Natalie, Sarah's neighbor on The Sarah Silverman Program. In 2008, she was cast as The Genie on the Disney Channel show Wizards Of Waverly Place. In 2009, Brown joined the main cast of the comedy Head Case, on the Starz TV network.

In 2011, Brown portrayed the character Sarah Drummond on Torchwood's fourth season, Torchwood: Miracle Day, airing on BBC One in the United Kingdom and premium television network Starz.

In 2012, Candace joined the cast of Shameless, portraying the character "Alana Murphy" on the show's second season, airing on Showtime.

Since 2013, Candace has appeared on The Mindy Project and was cast in pilots for both Nickelodeon and FOX. She also made an appearance on the ABC comedy, Suburgatory and was a regular sketch performer on The Tonight Show with Jay Leno as well as performing stand-up comedy and improv around the U.S.
