= Lakelands, Gaithersburg, Maryland =

Coordinates: 39°7′3″N 77°13′50″W

Lakelands is a neo-traditional neighborhood located in Gaithersburg, Maryland. It is located adjacent to and was designed as an extension of Kentlands, another neo-traditional neighborhood.

== See also ==
- Kentlands, Gaithersburg, Maryland
- Lakelands Park
- Lakelands Park Middle School
- Gaithersburg, Maryland
