= Quince Orchard, Gaithersburg, Maryland =

Quince Orchard, Maryland
- Neighborhood of Gaithersburg
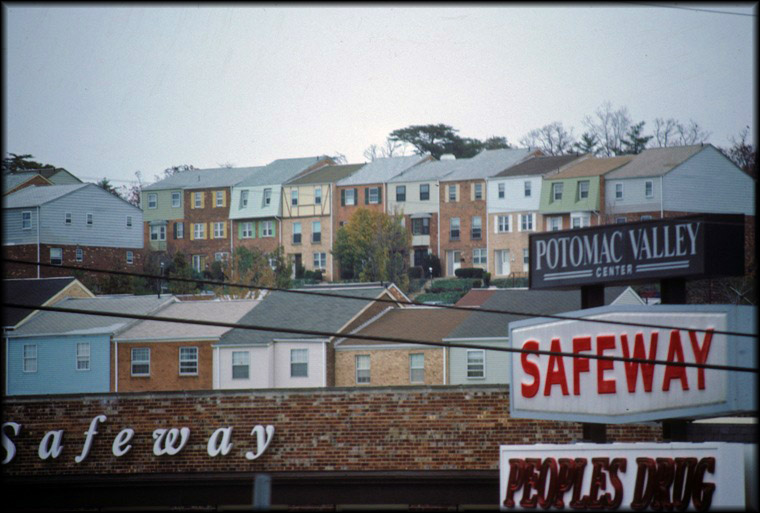
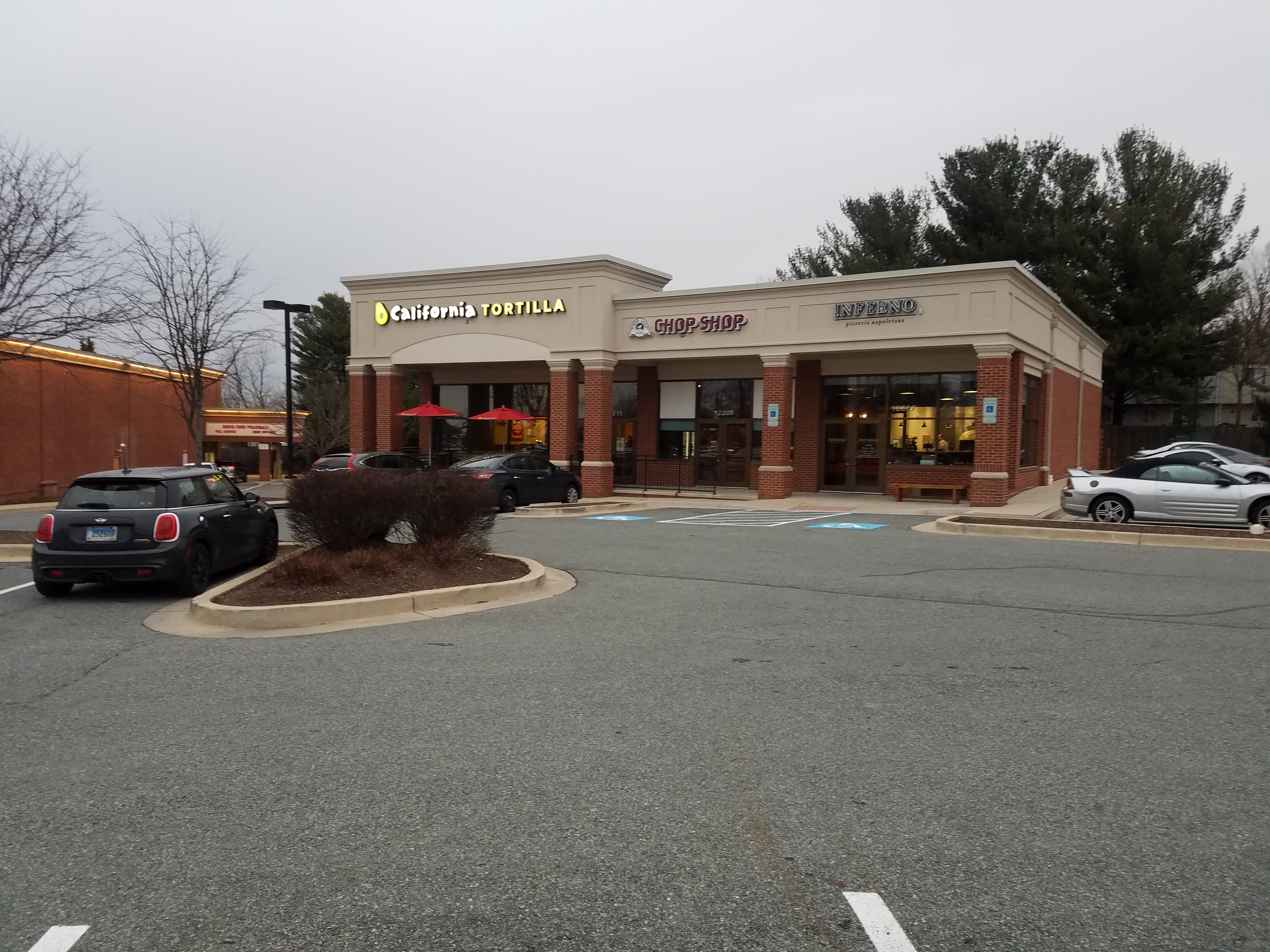
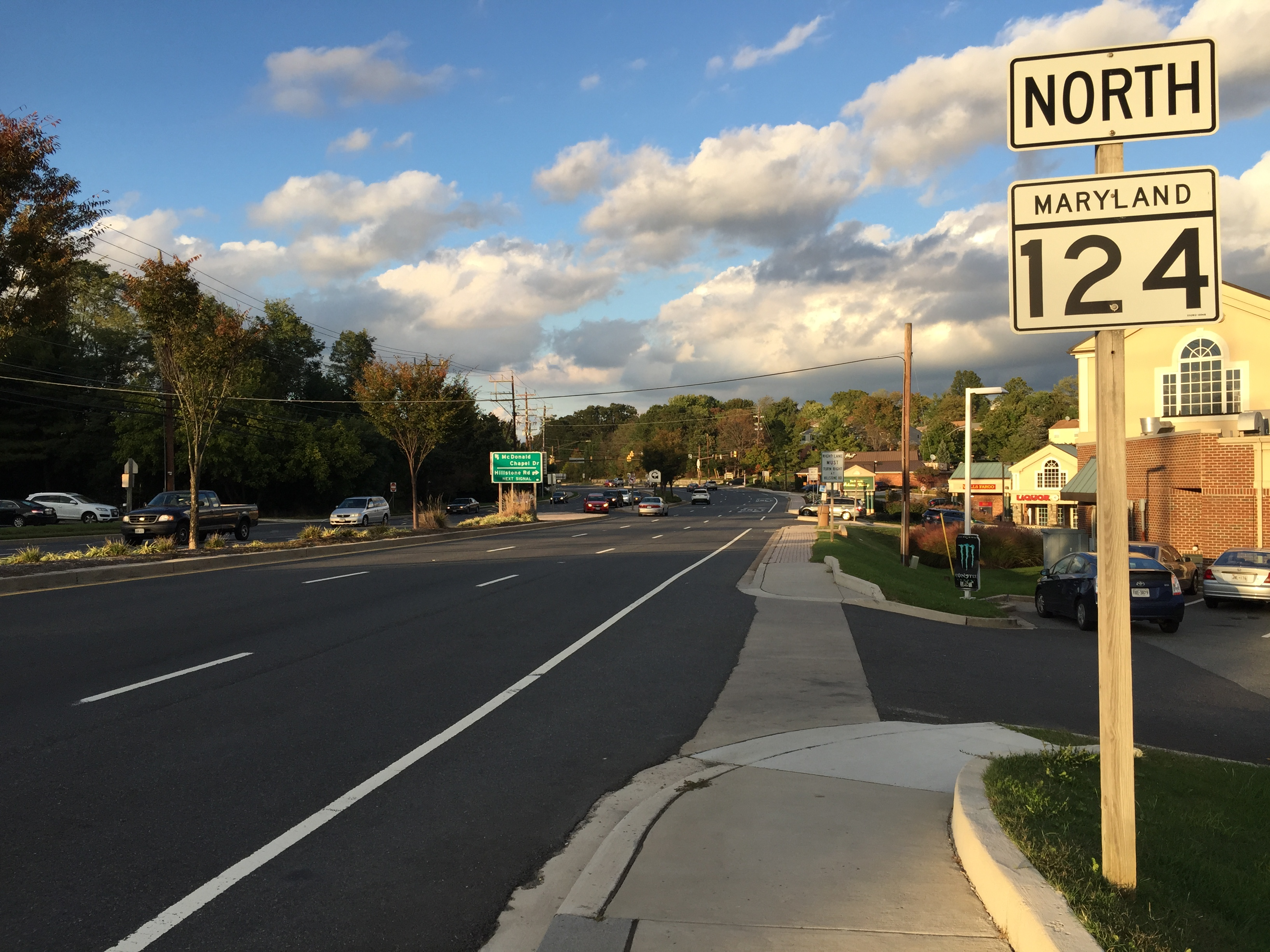
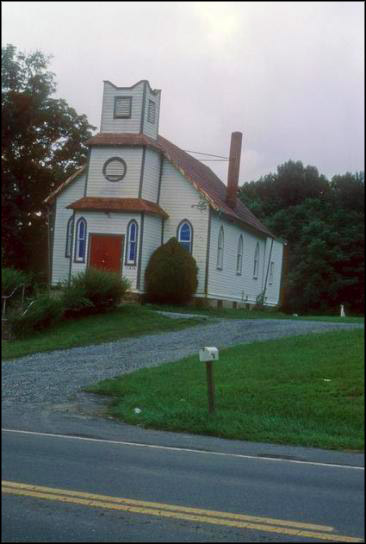
- From left to right, clockwise: Quince Orchard in 1987, Quince Orchard in 2017, Quince Orchard in 2016, Quince Orchard in 1984.
- Interactive map of Quince Orchard, Maryland
- Coordinates: 39.118239°N 77.251292°W
- Country: United States
- State: Maryland
- County: Montgomery
- City: Gaithersburg

Quince Orchard is a neighborhood of the U.S. city of Gaithersburg, Maryland, United States, located on the western outskirts of the city.

== Geography ==
Quince Orchard is located south of Kentlands, right on the western city limits of Gaithersburg. The intersection of Darnestown Road and Quince Orchard Road is the epicenter of Quince Orchard.

== History ==
The Quince Orchard Colored School was constructed in 1874 in northeastern Darnestown, taking its name from the area's colonial-era quince orchards. The area has been known as Quince Orchard since at least 1885. Quince Orchard has had its own post office since at least 1899.

McDonald Chapel, now called Pleasant View Church, was dedicated in 1903. It was named after the late Rev. W.A. McDonald, who began the movement leading to the building of the church.

In 1984, the Montgomery County Council voted to build Quince Orchard High School in order to reduce crowding at Gaithersburg High School, and it allocated $20 million for its construction in 1984. The school was expected to have 1,680 students upon opening, and it was designed to have a capacity of 2,000 students. In 1987, a group of parents asked the Board of Education to name the school Potomac Falls High School instead, but the Board of Education decided to name it Quince Orchard High School because it was being built on Quince Orchard Road. Construction costs ended up totaling $26 million by the time the school opened on September 6, 1988.

== Education ==
- Quince Orchard High School
- Quince Orchard Library
- Rachel Carson Elementary School
