= List of Greek episodes =

Greek is an American comedy-drama television series which follows the students of fictional Cyprus-Rhodes University (CRU) who participate in the school's Greek system. It was created by Patrick Sean Smith and premiered on ABC Family network on July 9, 2007.

== Series overview ==
After the first 10 episodes of Greek aired, production was halted because of the Writers Guild Strike. Prior to the airing of the remainder of season 1, a compilation of the first 10 episodes titled Season One: Chapter One was released. Following suit, the latter half of season 1 was later compiled as Season 1: Chapter Two. Later seasons would be divided into two halves, or simply "chapters."

Season	Chapter	Episodes		Originally released	
Season	Chapter	Episodes		First released	Last released
1	Chapter One	22	10	July 9, 2007	September 10, 2007
1	Chapter Two	22	12	March 24, 2008	June 9, 2008
2	Chapter Three	22	10	August 26, 2008	October 28, 2008
2	Chapter Four	22	12	March 30, 2009	June 15, 2009
3	Chapter Five	20		August 31, 2009	March 29, 2010
4	Chapter Six	10		January 3, 2011	March 7, 2011

== Episodes ==
=== Season 1 (2007–08) ===
The first chapter of Greek opens as incoming freshman, Rusty Cartwright (Jacob Zachar) matriculates at Cyprus-Rhodes University (CRU). Rusty is the science-geek brother to social butterfly of CRU's Greek system, Casey Cartwright (Spencer Grammer). When Rusty decides to rush a fraternity, their social lives collide. Rusty discovers Casey's boyfriend, Evan (Jake McDorman), cheating on Casey with Rebecca Logan (Dilshad Vadsaria), an incoming, freshman pledge. Casey gets even with Evan by sleeping with her ex-boyfriend, Cappie (Scott Michael Foster), the president of the party fraternity, Kappa Tau, which Rusty joins. Throughout the season, Casey works to repair her relationship with Evan, and deal with Rebecca's acrimonious attempt to undermine her leadership at ZBZ. Rusty navigates the balance between being a fraternity brother and honors engineering student, with the help of Casey, Cappie, his roommate Dale (Clark Duke), friend Calvin (Paul James), and his first girlfriend, Jen K. (Jessica Rose). Ashleigh (Amber Stevens) befriends Calvin, and unwittingly outs him to Omega Chi. When Jen K. writes a story for the school paper exposing Greek secrets, Casey finds herself established as ZBZ's interim president. Rusty breaks-up with Jen K., and Evan breaks-up with Casey due to her ambiguous feelings for Cappie.

Chapter two opens the first week of the new semester. The Greeks find themselves under the auspices of new rules and regulations, and Casey finds herself under the watchful eye of Nationals representative, Lizzie (Senta Moses), who brings a higher level of tradition and conservatism to the sisterhood. Cappie and Rebecca begin dating, Evan and Casey learn how to be friends until Evan's jealousy gets in the way, Casey forgives Frannie and lets her back into ZBZ, Rusty mourns the loss of his first relationship, and the rivalry between fraternities splinters his friendship with Calvin. Cappie, Casey, Evan, and Frannie's histories are explored in a flashback episode. Greek traditions are explored throughout chapter two, such as the Mr. Purr-fect competition, the All Greek Ball, and Parents Weekend. All this activity leads up to Spring Break when Rebecca's father's scandalous proclivities hit home, forcing a drunken confrontation with Cappie, an unplanned kiss on the beach between him and Casey, and a reconciliation between Rusty and Calvin.

No. overall	No. in season	Title	Directed by	Written by	Original release date
Chapter One
1	1	"Pilot"	Gil Junger	Patrick Sean Smith	July 9, 2007
Two siblings, Casey and Rusty Cartwright, attend Cyprus-Rhodes University. Rusty is a freshman science geek, who decides to rush a fraternity, invading his popular sister’s social life, giving them an opportunity to build a relationship with one another.
2	2	"Hazed and Confused"	Gil Junger	Patrick Sean Smith	July 16, 2007
It’s pledge week at CRU! Rusty receives a lesson in balancing frat life with his honors engineering coursework, learning about brotherhood along the way. Casey and Ashleigh get ZBZ in hot water over the undue hazing of Rebecca Logan. And, Kappa Tau and Omega Chi battle it out over beer pong, much to Calvin’s misfortune.
3	3	"The Rusty Nail"	Gil Junger	Carter Covington & Patrick Sean Smith	July 23, 2007
Rusty panics over finding a date for a fraternity function, when Cappie makes arrangements that guarantee “Spitter” will lose his virginity. Meanwhile, things aren’t going great in the bedroom for Evan and Casey, who haven’t had sex since Evan’s infidelity, due to lingering trust issues. Calvin and Ashleigh bond over planning the Omega Chi/ZBZ mixer, but Ashleigh misinterprets Calvin’s motives.
4	4	"Picking Teams"	Nick Marck	Sharon Bordas & Damon Hill	July 30, 2007
Omega Chi and Kappa Tau are head to head in the intramural floor hockey finals, and Casey’s loyalties are in question once her night with Cappie during rush is revealed. Meanwhile, Rusty desperately wants to play for the Kappa Tau's, so he and Dale join forces in an attempt to use science to overcome his lack of coordination, without success. Calvin's reluctant to play for the Omega Chi's, despite his father's role as coach, as it brings up unhappy memories of coming out in high school.
5	5	"Liquid Courage"	Michael Lembeck	Jessica O'Toole & Amy Rardin	August 6, 2007
The KT’s prepare to throw their legendary homecoming party, but when the main feature (a live model of Mount Vesuvius) malfunctions, it’s up to Rusty to save the day. Rusty manipulates Dale into contributing the Remington Herzog Atmospheric Destabilizing Module to the cause, impressing ZBZ pledge, Jen K. Casey gears up to meet Evan’s parents, who are more concerned with connecting with Senator Logan’s daughter, Rebecca, forcing Evan to choose between what’s best for his family’s “connections” and what’s best for his relationship with Casey.
6	6	"Friday Night Frights"	Nick Marck	Carter Covington	August 13, 2007
Most of the Greek’s are at CRU’s away game, leaving just a handful of students on campus as a thunderstorm rolls into town. Casey has planned a slumber party for the pledges, but Rebecca hijacks the agenda, purporting that ZBZ is haunted by the ghost of a sister who killed herself. Evan and Calvin hunt for a rat in the Omega Chi house. The KT’s party continues despite the storm, when a mystery, biker chick (AnnaLynne McCord) shows up to pull Cappie out of his girl-induced apathy, only to discover she’s known him since their days at camp and has been obsessed with him ever since.
7	7	"Multiple Choice"	Michael Lange	Michael Berns	August 20, 2007
Midterms take a backseat to relationship drama as Casey is struggling with old feelings for Cappie, after Evan proposes lavaliering her, and Ashleigh’s pompous boyfriend comes to CRU from Brown, irritating everyone. This culminates in the ZBZ officers forcing Ashleigh to break up with Travis (Travis Van Winkle), and driving a wedge between Casey and Ashleigh. Meanwhile, Rusty’s Honors Physics midterm has grown in scope, forcing him into multiple all-nighters, he finally caves and seeks out Cappie who points him in the direction of a cheating hotline.
8	8	"Separation Anxiety"	Rachel Talalay	Roger Grant	August 27, 2007
Things are still frosty between Ashleigh and Casey, as ZBZ puts together a show for Dale’s after school care program. Jen K. and Rusty hit their own icy patch, after Rusty prematurely tells her he loves her, prompting Cappie to take Rusty to a strip club, as Cappie tries to get over Casey. Following an argument with Calvin after their date, Heath confesses to hooking up with another guy, forcing their breakup.
9	9	"Depth Perception"	Ellie Kanner	Sharon Bordas & Damon Hill	September 3, 2007
Casey and Frannie compete with each other for the title of Omega Chi Sweetheart, forcing a rift in their already shaky relationship. This may have implications on Casey's presidential bid the following year, as Frannie is staying to complete a 5th year at CRU. Rusty is in the glow of his first sexual relationship, but it's dampened by Dale's jealousy. To make some quick cash, Cappie signs up for a psychology experiment and finds himself locked in a room with Rebecca for 30 hours.
10	10	"Black, White and Read All Over"	Perry Lang	Carter Covington & Anne Kenney	September 10, 2007
In the first chapter finale, after an exposing article in the school's newspaper threatens CRU's Greek System, a "witch hunt" in search of the mystery undercover reporter begins. A representative from Nationals is also sent to investigate ZBZ and the university cracks down on the Greeks. Frannie insists that their best defense is to lie, but Casey is worried that the house might be shut down, and confesses to Teagen (Charisma Carpenter) the sorority’s role in the article. Tagen removes Frannie as president and appoints Casey as the interim; Frannie retaliates by convincing Evan that Casey is only with him because of his social standing, and he breaks-up with her. Meanwhile, Cappie and Rebecca sleep together, and Calvin comes out to Ashleigh, after she comes on to him; in an attempted apology, she accidentally outs Calvin to Omega Chi, forcing his resignation. Jen K. mentions lonelygirl15, another character played by the same actress.
Chapter Two
11	11	"A New Normal"	Michael Lange	Jessica O'Toole & Amy Rardin	March 24, 2008
Casey and ZBZ must face the fallout from Jen K.'s expose. Back on campus, Rusty feels the loss of his relationship with Jen K. more acutely. Casey plans an all Greek carnival for charity to get back on the university's good side. Cappie and Rebecca try to end their fling. Meanwhile, Dale starts U-SAG (University Students Against Greeks).
12	12	"The Great Cappie"	Michael Lange	Jed Seidel	March 31, 2008
ZBZ throws a Great Gatsby party with Kappa Tau, which Lizzie invites Dean Bowman (Alan Ruck) to, not knowing about the prohibition party in the basement. Cappie wants more commitment from Rebecca. Calvin considers pledging Kappa Tau, after leaving Omega Chi. Ashleigh mentions Ferris Bueller's Day Off to Dean Bowman, alluding to another film Involving Ruck.
13	13	"Highway To The Discomfort Zone"	Nick Marck	Carter Covington	April 7, 2008
Rebecca and Casey’s rivalry intensifies during Big Sister/Little Sister week after Casey learns of Rebecca and Cappie’s relationship, and hooks up with a 16-year-old. Meanwhile, Rusty feels alienated by his fellow Kappa Tau pledges. Dale attempts to "cure" Calvin of his homosexuality.
14	14	"War and Peace"	Norman Buckley	Jonathan Abrahams	April 14, 2008
Casey and Ashleigh work behind the scenes to pull out of the mixer with Psi Phi Pi that Lizzie committed ZBZ to. Casey learns that she must forgive and reinstate Frannie before Lizzie will leave. Meanwhile, Omega Chi and Kappa Tau start a prank war that threatens Rusty and Calvin's friendship.
15	15	"Freshman Daze"	Michael Lange	Roger Grant	April 21, 2008
The All Greek Ball stirs up memories from freshman year for Casey, Evan, and Cappie. Evan and Cappie's former friendship is revealed, as is the reason he and Casey broke up, and why the ball was canceled the previous year. Casey finds out about a past kind act by Frannie, which allows Casey to forgive her, reinstating Frannie at ZBZ.
16	16	"Move On. Cartwrights"	Michael Lange	Anne Kenney	April 28, 2008
Zeta Beta and Omega Chi have their first mixer since the expose. Meanwhile, Rusty and Dale go on a double date with Emma (Tiya Sircar)and her overbearing, anti-Greek roommate, Tina (Lisa Wilhoit). Dale invites Tina to join U-SAG and when she quickly takes control, Rusty intercedes on his roommate's behalf.
17	17	"47 Hours & 11 Minutes"	Fred Gerber	Lisa Albert	May 5, 2008
It's freshman parents' week and Rusty attempts to prevent his parents from seeing Kappa Tau. Casey is concerned with impressing Senator Logan, while fighting off his disapproval. Dale discovers he's growing apart from his close-knit family. Discovering her father's infidelity, Rebecca uses Cappie to disappoint her high-profile father.
18	18	"Mister Purr-fect"	Michael Lange	Jessica O'Toole	May 12, 2008
ZBZ's Mister Purr-fect competition has CRU's fraternities squaring off against each other. Rebecca's competition with Casey causes her to push the KT's around unreasonably, but the "guy-code" prevents them from saying anything to Cappie about it. Casey finds herself drawn to a Lambda Sig, but Evan's jealousy gets in the way. Ashleigh introduces Calvin to her French TA, Michael.
19	19	"No Campus for Old Rules"	Michael Lange	Roger Grant	May 19, 2008
Cappie, Evan, and Dale go head-to-head in a debate over the Greek's social perks, the outcome of which will have a lasting impact on Greek restrictions. Rusty sleeps with U-SAG member, Tina. A double standard at ZBZ creates conflict between Casey and the other sisters. Dean Bowman (Alan Ruck) is on a date with a woman named Sloane, another allusion to Ferris Bueller's Day Off.
20	20	"A Tale of Two Parties"	Nick Marck	Michael Berns	May 26, 2008
To celebrate the lifting of the Dean's restrictions, Omega Chi throws a party for the best houses on campus. Feeling competitive, Cappie throws a rival party at Kappa Tau. Evan's jealousy gets in the way of Casey's attempt to meet a new guy. Casey prevents Rebecca from attending the KT party.
21	21	"Barely Legal"	Fred Gerber	Jessica O'Toole, Amy Rardin & Jed Seidel	June 2, 2008
The Kappa Tau pledges are given fake IDs in preparation for spring break, and Rusty gets lucky when a bartender believes he is a reclusive musician. Casey signs up for a LSAT prep class, enlisting Evan's help, only to discover her heart's not into becoming a lawyer. Ashleigh overspends on her credit card.
22	22	"Spring Broke"	Michael Lange	Carter Covington & Patrick Sean Smith	June 9, 2008
The Greeks head to Myrtle Beach for spring break and everyone lets loose, especially Rebecca after she hears some devastating news. In an effort to get over Casey, Evan finds himself drawn to Frannie. Rusty discovers that spring break is not all it's cracked up to be and heads home.

=== Season 2 (2008–09) ===
The third chapter opens during Greek week, Cappie and Casey try to curb Rebecca's rebellious behavior, leading to Cappie and Rebecca's breakup. Evan continues his relationship with Frannie, begun over Spring Break, his competition with Cappie heats up, and he accepts a multimillion-dollar trust fund from his parents, despite their attached strings. Casey begins dating Rusty's RA, Max (Michael Rady), a polymer science grad student, of whom Cappie grows jealous. Frannie begins a bid for a second presidential term, competing with Casey for the title, but unbeknownst to anyone Rebecca and the other pledges vote to elect Ashleigh (Amber Stevens). The chapter ends on Hell Week, when the pledges prove themselves to their houses, Casey and Max face the dilemma of a long-distance relationship, and Frannie establishes a new sorority, taking half of ZBZ with her.

It's a new year at CRU, when chapter four begins. Casey's fresh off a disappointing internship in DC, but Max turns down Caltech to stay with Casey at CRU, pushing the commitment level beyond her comfort zone. When Max leaves for a month, it gives Casey time to consider their relationship. Frannie's competitive sorority, Iota Kappa Iota challenges ZBZ during rush, forcing the once prestigious sorority to accept less esteemed pledges. Rusty begins dating Jordan, but when facing a failing grade in an important class, he decides that his social life is more important to him at the moment. Cappie and Max's dislike for each other intensifies, but Evan and Cappie begin to rekindle their friendship, when pushed together as part of the Amphora Society, CRU's secret society. Evan turns down his trust fund. Frannie puts Ashleigh in the hot seat with Panhellenic, lying to get her expelled, but in a confrontation with the ZBZ president, Frannie chooses to shut IKI down, realizing it will never be ZBZ, and leaves CRU. Casey is content to commit to Max once he returns, until a near-death experience forces her to realize that she's still in love with Cappie, but Cappie's been used too many times by Casey, and turns her down.

No. overall	No. in season	Title	Directed by	Written by	Original release date	US viewers (millions)
Chapter Three
23	1	"Brothers and Sisters"	Michael Lange	Anne Kenney, Jessica O'Toole & Amy Rardin	August 26, 2008	1.60
The fallout from spring break is felt during the annual Greek week competition. Casey focuses on continuing the Zeta Beta’s winning streak while trying to control an unruly Rebecca. Meanwhile, Rusty and Calvin’s friendship is put to the test when Cappie and Evan’s rivalry intensifies. Additionally, Frannie tries to tell Casey about Evan.
24	2	"Crush Landing"	Patrick Norris	Dana Calvo & Carter Covington	September 2, 2008	1.39
Rusty grows bored with his polymer science major and looks to his new RA, Max, for some advice. Meanwhile, Frannie and Evan’s relationship is now public, and Frannie hopes that she and Casey can still be friends. Senator Logan’s scandal makes Rebecca an outcast, and Cappie tries to cheer her up by using her notoriety to get her free stuff.
25	3	"Let's Make a Deal"	Linda Mendoza	Roger Grant	September 9, 2008	1.29
Ashleigh's bill for her credit card is much higher than she expected, and enlists Casey to help her learn to count cards, who in turn enlists Rusty and Max to teach them how to count cards in an effort to win at 21 during Omega Chi's Casino Night. Meanwhile, Evan receives his trust fund, while Rebecca offers to buy Cappie a new car.
26	4	"Gays, Ghosts and Gamma Rays"	Michael Lange	Michael Berns	September 16, 2008	0.97
In the process of studying all the actives, the KT pledges come across an unfamiliar name. Upon discovering the mystery active's identity, trouble for the Kappa Tau's ensues. Casey has a crush on Max, but their budding romance hits a snag when she thinks he has a girlfriend but she is actually dead. Additionally, Michael wants Calvin to have more gay friends and Ashleigh takes Rebecca to a gay bar to get over Cappie.
27	5	"Pledge Allegiance"	Gil Junger	Mike Ladd	September 23, 2008	0.76
Fed up being bossed around by the actives at Kappa Tau, the KT pledges stage a revolt. Tensions heat up between Casey and Frannie when both start a battle to win the Zeta Beta pledges for their own personal needs. Evan uses his newly acquired trust fund to bribe Michael, Calvin's boyfriend.
28	6	"See You Next Time, Sisters"	Michael Lange	Jessica O'Toole & Amy Rardin	September 30, 2008	N/A
Casey, Frannie, and Ashleigh attend the annual, ZBZ conference, and Frannie takes it upon herself to introduce a proposal that, if passed, will allow her to seek the ZBZ presidency again. Kappa Tau faces closure due to housing violations until they agree to host the honor engineering program's annual Galileo party.
29	7	"Formally Yours"	Fred Gerber	Carter Covington	October 7, 2008	1.02
As the ZBZ spring formal draws near, Casey worries whether a socially awkward Max will make a good impression. When Kappa Tau cancels their participation, Ashleigh takes the desperate Rusty as her date. Cappie and Rebecca can’t stay away from each other despite being broken-up.
30	8	"The Popular Vote"	Melanie Mayron	Matt Whitney	October 14, 2008	0.89
To garner more votes for the upcoming presidential election, Frannie and Casey use unfriendly tactics. Rusty tries speed dating, but reunites with Jen K while out on one of his dates. Calvin is unsure if he should breakup with Michael since cheating on him with Heath (Zack Lively).
31	9	"Three's a Crowd"	Sandy Smolan	Michael Berns, Dana Calvo, Jessica O'Toole & Amy Rardin	October 21, 2008	1.05
Ashleigh is challenged adjusting to her new role as ZBZ president, which Frannie uses to her advantage. Dale introduces Rusty to his old buddy, Kirk (Dan Byrd), but when Rusty discovers Kirk’s substance dependency, it causes a rift in his friendship with Dale. Cappie tries to reclaim his status as a ladies’ man.
32	10	"Hell Week"	Michael Lange	Roger Grant	October 28, 2008	1.04
During the last week of the school year, the Greeks initiate their pledges. Rusty's failures lead the Kappa Tau's to question if he is a good fit. Casey and Max's relationship hits a road block when they realize they'll be spending the summer apart. Casey seeks advice from Lauren Conrad in a dream. Frannie leaves ZBZ with half the sisters to start a new sorority.
Chapter Four
33	11	"Take Me Home, Cyprus-Rhodes"	Michael Lange	Jessica O'Toole & Amy Rardin	March 30, 2009	0.99
Casey's resolve to focus on her education is put to the test when Ashleigh needs her help to battle rival sorority, Iota Kappa Iota, Frannie's new house. Calvin invites his high school friend, Andy (Jesse McCartney) to rush, who shows interest in both Omega Chi and Kappa Tau. Rusty and Dale take over Casey's lease when she decides to recommit to ZBZ.
34	12	"From Rushing with Love"	Fred Savage	Matt Whitney	April 6, 2009	0.83
Cappie is hesitant to offer Andy a bid, whereas Evan puts pressure on Calvin to get Andy to pledge Omega Chi. Casey and Ashleigh rely on Rebecca, who is acting as a mole for ZBZ, to supply them with IKI's rush plans. When they assume that Rebecca’s information is false, they begin to suspect that she's a double agent.
35	13	"Engendered Species"	Michael Lange	Jonathan Abrahams	April 13, 2009	N/A
Desperate for some help around the house, Ashleigh hires a handsome, work-study student as their hasher. Fisher (Andrew J. West) garners the unwanted attention of the ZBZ sisters. Rusty, Dale and Calvin take an art history class, where Rusty falls for a transfer student named Jordan (Johanna Braddy).
36	14	"Big Littles & Jumbo Shrimp"	Shawn Piller	Mark Stegemann	April 20, 2009	0.71
After finding Andy kissing Jordan, Rusty is hesitant to take on the role of Andy’s big brother. At ZBZ food goes missing from the pantry, which leaves Casey and Rebecca to suspect Fisher is the thief. When they confront Ashleigh about it, she refuses to believe them despite the evidence against him. Evan's older brother visits.
37	15	"Evasive Actions"	Michael Lange	Carter Covington	April 27, 2009	N/A
ZBZ and IKI go head to head in a game of dodgeball, enlisting Jordan's help. Rusty becomes concerned when Dale stops leaving their new apartment, and enlists the Kappa Tau's push him out.
38	16	"Dearly Beloved"	Melanie Mayron	Michael Berns	May 4, 2009	N/A
Former ZBZ, Kiki (Collette Wolfe), is back at CRU for her wedding, and all the ZBZ's are invited (including Frannie). Max decides to take his relationship with Casey to the next level. Jordan enlists Rusty to help with floral arrangement duties, and they bond over allergies, leading to a regrettable kiss during the reception. Rebecca kisses another former ZBZ, Robin Wylie (Anna Osceola) Ashleigh's big sis, and begins questioning her sexuality.
39	17	"Guilty Treasures"	Norman Buckley	Roger Grant	May 11, 2009	0.75
Casey finds out about an overseas internship for Max, and gets him the bid by sneaking him into a faculty party. When chasing out an Omega Chi pledge, the KTs uncover a secret stash of goods stolen by former brothers. Rusty and Andy are caught returning a football, after Rusty confesses to kissing Jordan. Andy de-pledges, causing a rift between Rusty and Cappie. Ashleigh is hesitant to take her relationship with Fisher public.
40	18	"Divine Secrets and the ZBZ Sisterhood"	Michael Lange	Jessica O'Toole & Amy Rardin	May 18, 2009	0.68
In an attempt to impress Cappie, Rusty tries to solve a mystery involving CRU's secret society. Former ZBZ's who defected to IKI ask Casey if they can return. Rebecca seeks dating advice from Calvin, as she prepares to go out with Robin.
41	19	"Social Studies"	Patrick Norris	Matt Whitney	May 25, 2009	0.71
Cappie and Casey, Rusty and Jordan, and Evan and Rebecca all spend the night together studying for their midterms. Rusty and Jordan realize their feelings for each other, as do Cappie and Casey. While Jordan and Rusty start upon a relationship, Casey is hesitant to admit to caring for Cappie, and the two decide to go their separate ways.
42	20	"Isn't It Bro-mantic"	Michael Lange	Adam Milch & Mark Stegemann	June 1, 2009	0.63
A lonely Casey meddles in Rusty's first date with Jordan. Calvin gets a new roommate, only to discover it's Grant (Gregory Michael), a brother who's secretly come out to Calvin. Evan and Cappie reach a detente.
43	21	"Tailgate Expectation"	Tim Matheson	Michael Berns & Anne Kenney	June 8, 2009	0.67
The ZBZ's and Kappa Tau's are paired up for the homecoming float competition. Rusty, Ashleigh, and Heath want to win, eventually sabotaging the Omega Chi/IKI float. Casey and Cappie try to avoid one another. Evan's parents want him to seek counseling before continuing to benefit from his trust fund, but he decides to turn it down. Ashleigh uncovers Fisher's secret.
44	22	"At World's End"	Michael Lange	Roger Grant, Jessica O'Toole & Amy Rardin	June 15, 2009	0.75
Max is back, but after Casey falls into a manhole, she realizes she's still in love with Cappie. Though Cappie turns her down, she breaks-up with Max. Ashleigh faces expulsion for her part in sabotaging the IKI float, and is left to face Frannie and Panhellenic alone. Dale is having trouble keeping his cougar girlfriend's sexual advances at bay. Calvin is trying to resist his attraction for Grant by avoiding Omega Chi. Frannie realizes IKI will never be ZBZ and she closes down the sorority planning on leaving CRU once her classes are finished.

=== Season 3 (2009–10) ===
The fifth chapter of Greek continues during the fall semester of last season, while the sixth chapter takes place during the winter semester.

No. overall	No. in season	Title	Directed by	Written by	Original release date	US viewers (millions)
Chapter Five
45	1	"The Day After"	Michael Lange	Patrick Sean Smith	August 31, 2009	1.21
After being dumped by Casey, Max quit the grad school program and went back to England, unbeknownst to Casey and disappointing Rusty who needed help on an extra credit project for Organic Chem. In a flashback to the "End of the World" party the night before, it is revealed that Cappie did not pursue Casey because Evan unknowingly intervened. At the same party, it is revealed that Rebecca's secret kiss was with Fisher. Meanwhile, Dale confesses to Calvin that he broke their purity pledge, and proposes to Sheila.
46	2	"Our Fathers"	Patrick Norris	Jessica O’Toole & Amy Rardin	September 7, 2009	1.31
Casey finds out about Rebecca and Fisher secret kiss, but when Rebecca confesses to Ashleigh, she outs Casey for keeping it a secret. When Mr. Cartwright, Mr. Howard, and Mr. Logan arrive for Father-Daughter weekend at ZBZ, they find out about their daughters' feud, and it reflects upon their weekend behavior. At the same event, Rusty gets nervous about meeting Jordan's father. Meanwhile, in an effort to get over their lost loves, Dale and Cappie fawn over the same girl, but they both ultimately get rejected.
47	3	"The Half-Naked Gun"	Michael Lange	Roger Grant	September 14, 2009	N/A
It's time for the annual all-Greek "Undie Run", and the Pan-Hellenic board voted strongly against it. In an effort to change the vote, Casey uses her political savvy to enlist IFC president, Evan, to stage a petition signing. Meanwhile, it's nearing the end of the Greek-wide game of Gotcha!, and only Rusty and Jordan are left, which puts a damper in their effort to spend alone time together. Additionally, Evan finds out about Calvin and Grant's relationship and helps them keep it a secret from the rest of Omega Chi.
48	4	"High and Dry"	Shawn Piller	Casey Johnson & David Windsor	September 21, 2009	0.77
Casey patrols non-alcohol party night during Dry Weekend on campus until she and Evan unknowingly eat some special brownies. Meanwhile, Grant's old high school girlfriend surprises him with a visit, and Rusty seeks academic help at a book signing.
49	5	"Down on Your Luck"	Michael Lange	Matt Whitney	September 28, 2009	0.74
Ashleigh gives Fisher another chance after he kissed Rebecca. Rusty tries to give Jordan a lavalier, combatting the frat curse. Casey balances working on Inter-Greek and the pledges. Evan and Cappie get jobs as cater-waiters.
50	6	"Lost and Founders"	Fred Gerber	Michael Berns	October 5, 2009	0.72
The ZBZ house holds a Founders' week, and the girls try to raise money from the grads. Ashleigh and Rebecca compete to raise more money from the grads, while Casey tries to raise money from an extremely wealthy founder and engages in a relationship with her young male associate. Rusty worries about Jordan's dwindling interest in school. Cappie manages a date with Lana.
51	7	"The Dork Knight"	Rick Rosenthal	Adam Milch	October 12, 2009	0.66
Rusty, Dale and Calvin go to the local comic convention. Rusty tries to deal with his latest break-up with Jordan via telecommunication. Meanwhile, Casey wants to find out the real relationship between Cappie and Evan, desiring that they can be like in the freshman year. Ashleigh and Fisher deal with some problems in their relationship.
52	8	"Fight the Power"	Michael Lange	Jessica O'Toole & Amy Rardin	October 19, 2009	0.68
Cappie grows distant from Lana and Rusty points out that she's just like Cappie. Meanwhile ZBZ tries to get back to number one.
53	9	"The Wish-Pretzel"	Melanie Mayron	Lana Cho & Matt Whitney	October 26, 2009	0.77
Everyone is packing their bags and heading home for Thanksgiving, but Casey and Rusty find themselves stranded at CRU when their parents leave them behind for Maui. Will Thanksgiving at CRU beat going home for the holidays?
54	10	"Friend or Foe"	Michael Lange	Roger Grant	November 2, 2009	0.66
Casey and Cappie are finally back together. In a shocking twist, the Omega Chis frame Kappa Tau and 3 members of KT are expelled, ending Evan and Cappie's friendship. Rusty and Dale's argument comes to a head as the grant is not yet awarded. ZBZ competes for house points in the Song Fest but the results are rigged. As Zeta Beta Zeta fights to take their number one spot back, Casey is offered a position on Pan-Hel's board forcing her to choose between this new opportunity and ZBZ. The ZBZ and Gamma Psi rivalry burns out as the Gamma Psi house burns down. Evan and Rebecca share a special moment.
55	11	"I Know What You Did Last Semester"	Michael Lange	Casey Johnson & David Windsor	January 25, 2010	1.03
The ZBZ's and The KT's both deal with the events of last semester. ZBZ deals with burning down the Gamma Psi house and KT with 3 of their brothers being expelled. Tension starts between Casey and Cappie by not being able to talk to each other about their problems. A fairy tale party is thrown in order to help the Gamma Psi's earn money to help build their new house. Rusty struggles with Cappie not trusting him when he tries out being the pledge educator and Ashleigh tells Casey she and Fisher broke up. Grant continues to put off coming out to the rest of the house, which upsets Calvin.
56	12	"Pride & Punishment"	John T. Kretchmer	Jessica O’Toole & Amy Rardin	February 1, 2010	1.07
Casey's guilt peaks over burning down the Gamma Psi's house. Ashleigh holds a nerd auction to raise money for Gamma Psi and help Rusty date a Tri-Pi girl. Evan and Cappie fight publicly in an Amphora meeting. Cappie and Rebecca fight for a single position in the Human Sexuality class.
57	13	"Take Me Out"	Lee Rose	Matt Whitney	February 8, 2010	0.98
The Greek softball tournament is being held. ZBZ and Omega Chi team up and KT and Gamma Psi so the game between those rivals is full of tension. Casey sets Ashleigh up with Beaver. Casey struggles if she should throw the game for Cappie or win for ZBZ. Evan and Rebecca spend some time together.
58	14	"The Tortoise and the Hair"	Michael Lange	Rob Bragin	February 15, 2010	0.96
Casey starts thinking about what to do after graduation. She has problems talking to Cappie about it. She throws a register your vote party at Doblers in order to impress a guy named Joel (Samuel Page) who she is trying to help out with voter registration at CRU in order for him to get her a job in Washington after graduation. Meanwhile, Rusty and Dana work in the project and deal with some issues.
59	15	"Love, Actually, Possibly, Maybe... Or Not"	Mark Rosman	Roger Grant	February 22, 2010	0.87
It's Valentines day and Casey and Cappie compete in who can find the most romantic gift. Ashleigh goes to the Omega Chi party with Pete. Rebecca and Evan go together and Casey sets Rusty up with Katherine trying to become closer with her again after the fire.
60	16	"Your Friends and Neighbors"	Michael Lange	Dana Greenblatt	March 1, 2010	0.94
Applications for law school are due and Casey's worrying about finishing her personal statement. This causes problems between her and Ashleigh because they are not as close as they once were. Meanwhile at the Kappa house, new neighbors mean new trouble. When a professor moves in next door and creates a lot of rules for the fraternity, the boys try to make him one of the guys. Meanwhile, Omega Chi searches for the money stolen during the Valentine's Day party, while Rebecca searches for the necklace Evan gave her.
61	17	"The Big Easy Does It"	Fred Savage	Casey Johnson & David Windsor	March 8, 2010	1.03
Casey attempts to stay focused for her LSAT exam while the festivities of Mardi Gras happen all over campus and through the KT house. Evan works as a bartender at Gentleman's Choice to earn money back from buying Rebecca a necklace, where he sees Rebecca kiss someone else. Katherine tells Rusty that she wants him to be her first sexual experience, upsetting his lab assistant who tells him she likes him. Cappie and Casey discuss their future.
62	18	"Camp Buy Me Love"	Michael Lange	Jessica O’Toole & Amy Rardin	March 15, 2010	0.82
Casey and Cappie get a surprise visit from Cappie's parents, who invite them to a camping trip. A reluctant Casey agrees to go, in hopes that they might encourage Cappie to choose a major and graduate with her. However, she quickly learns that they are free-loving hippies who think Cappie should just relax and enjoy his college experience. Meanwhile, Dobler's is hosting an 80's party and Rusty doesn't know which girl to bring, Katherine or Dana. Ashleigh, who has been reading about the 80's romantic comedies, offers to help Rusty choose the right one. Calvin offers to help Evan get inside the ZBZ house to get back the necklace he gave Rebecca, but he's still upset about getting cheated on and takes his frustration out on Rusty.
63	19	"The First Last"	Patrick Norris	Roger Grant & Matt Whitney	March 22, 2010	0.82
Cappie and Rusty get kidnapped before their golf game with Evan. Cappie refuses to tell Rusty of his revenge plan and his decision causes some tension between them. Meanwhile, Dale asks Calvin to help him talk to a young boy about coming out of the closet. When Calvin speaks to the boy, he begins to question his relationship with Grant, and also finds solace with his old flame Heath. Casey and Rebecca fight over who is to represent ZBZ in a Greek Week beauty pageant. And Evan is dealing with the aftermath of his breakup with Rebecca.
64	20	"All Children...Grow Up"	Michael Lange	Patrick Sean Smith	March 29, 2010	0.71
Calvin and Trip are nominated for Omega Chi's president. Casey got admitted into George Washington Law School in Washington DC and got rejected by CRU. Dale joins Rusty and Dana for spring break at Myrtle Beach and eventually admits he wants to have more fun in college. Ashleigh gets an unpaid internship as a trend forecaster. KT's "revenge plan" ultimately made Calvin the future president for the Omega Chi. Evan and Rebecca make up. Casey decides she wants to go to law school in DC instead of staying in Cyprus. Casey assumes that a long distance relationship would not work, and that they would have to break up at graduation. Angry that she thinks so little of them, Cappie breaks up with her.

=== Season 4 (2011) ===
On February 19, 2010, it was announced that Greek had been renewed for a 10-episode fourth and final season. The first episode of the final season aired January 3, 2011.

No. overall	No. in season	Title	Directed by	Written by	Original release date	US viewers (millions)
Chapter Six
65	1	"Defending Your Honor"	Michael Lange	Matt Whitney	January 3, 2011	1.20
Ashleigh starts her job in NY, while Rebecca starts her term as ZBZ president. Casey investigates why she didn't get into CRU Law. Rusty runs for Kappa Tau President against Cappie.
66	2	"Fools Rush In"	Lee Shallat	Roger Grant	January 10, 2011	1.07
Kappa Tau for the first time decides to actually try to recruit pledges. Rebecca prepares ZBZ for Rush but receives a surprise visit from Tegan, who declares Casey as house mother since Rebecca has not found one. Dale considers joining a fraternity.
67	3	"Cross Examined Life"	Michael Lange	Jason Gavin & Roger Grant	January 17, 2011	0.92
Rusty and Dana plan a murder mystery party to help Dale learn to socialize. Casey is struggling in law school when she is reunited with Ashleigh who has lost her job.
68	4	"All About Beav"	Lee Rose	Jessica O’Toole & Amy Rardin	January 24, 2011	0.90
Beaver needs to rewrite a paper and forms an unlikely study group with Casey and Katherine. Rusty, Dana and Ashleigh team up to work on a science project. Rebecca uses Cappie to make Evan jealous. Rusty breaks up with Dana after they fight about the project.
69	5	"Home Coming and Going"	Patrick Norris	Adam Milch	January 31, 2011	0.91
Cappie throws a big party for homecoming in efforts to impress Kappa Tau alumni Lasker Parks who comes to check on his son Peter, a pledge. Casey tries to help Ashleigh find a job and move out. Rusty attempts to pull off a prank to try to impress Peter but is confronted by Dale. Rusty is named pledge Spidey's big brother.
70	6	"Fumble"	Lee Rose	Carter Covington	February 7, 2011	1.15
Casey and Cappie wake up together and Casey kicks him out of the house before anyone finds out, claiming that nothing can happen between them. Rusty wakes up from the party completely hungover, and unable to remember what happened. He finds red lipstick on his mouth, and sets out on a search with Calvin to find the mystery girl. Casey and Cappie meet up later and realize that they did not use protection the night before. Casey gets the morning after pill just in case. At ZBZ, the sisters are watching over faculty children during the big game, and Cappie comes over to help Casey, and to prove to her that he’s matured. Rusty also divulges to Casey that Cappie declared a major. Later that night, Casey and Cappie share a romantic moment in the playground. Meanwhile, Professor Segal (Josh Randall) flirts with Ashleigh, who is still distraught about her undetermined future. Rusty, though a hero to the school for stealing the goat returns home unable to find the mystery girl. He finds Ashleigh there, getting ready for a date with Segal. An ensuing flashback reveals that Rusty was drunkenly comforting Ashleigh the night before, and they shared a quick kiss. Ashleigh then gets up and leaves for her date with Segal.
71	7	"Midnight Clear"	Michael Lange	Rob Bragin, Jessica O’Toole & Amy Rardin	February 14, 2011	0.75
A snowstorm hits Cyprus just in time for Calvin's 21st birthday party. The gang celebrates at Dobler's where they all decide to play a game of "Kiss and Tell" where Rebecca's frustrations with Evan reaches the boiling point and Casey forces Ashleigh to talk to her.
72	8	"Subclass Plagiostomi"	Michael Lange	Stacy Rukeyser	February 21, 2011	0.85
Ashleigh begins to question her relationship with Simon, while Casey and Evan face off on opposing sides of a mock trial. Meanwhile, Rusty and Calvin try to save Dale from an embarrassing moment at a talent show.
73	9	"Agents for Change"	Michael Grossman	Roger Grant	February 28, 2011	0.89
Rebecca recruits the help of a former house president after she learns that ZBZ is up for the Golden Lily award for being the best chapter in the country, while the KTs try to find a way to save their house.
74	10	"Legacy"	Michael Lange	Patrick Sean Smith & Matt Whitney	March 7, 2011	0.92
The Greeks experience some life-altering changes. Casey finally discovers that she does not have the heart to fight for a cause that she does not believe in and decides to leave law school. Cappie tries to save the KT house and names Rusty as interim president. Rusty finds the task of saving the house too much to bear and relinquishes his title. Soon after, Cappie, Rusty, and the KT gang decide to have one last party before their house is destroyed by former KT alumn Lasker Parkes. Calvin tries to figure out his life's purpose and decides to take a semester off to travel to India (Heath decides to go with him). Rebecca finally confronts Evan about their relationship and Evan admits that he messed up the relationship and the two become friends. Dale finally enters into a relationship with Laura, but gives Casey a surprise farewell kiss (to Cappie's surprise). Evan finally manages to become friends with Cappie after he unsuccessfully protested against the destruction of the KT house. Ashleigh moves out of Rusty's apartment and after talking to Casey, she decides that she wants to date Rusty. Rusty proves to be a great leader when he tries to get Lasker to change his mind about demolishing the KT house, and even though he fails, he earns the respect of his KT brothers (especially Cappie). Rusty becomes the new president of KT and vows to find a new home for the KTs. Ashleigh finally approaches Rusty and tells him that she wants to date him; they kiss. Cappie finally grows up: he graduates, and decides to face the uncertain future by leaving with Casey as the whole gang (Rusty, Calvin, Dale, Ashleigh, Evan, and Rebecca) waves goodbye.

== Home media ==
In 2008, ABC/Disney released the first season on DVD in two volumes, titled Chapter One and Chapter Two. In 2009, the second season was also released on DVD in two volumes, titled Chapter Three and Chapter Four.

In 2010, Shout! Factory secured the rights for the rest of the series and released the third season on DVD as a complete set, titled Chapter Five: The Complete Third Season. On October 18, 2011, Shout! Factory released Greek: Chapter Six – The Complete Fourth Season as a Shout! Select title, available exclusively on their website. It eventually was released storewide at a later date.

DVD release dates for Greek
Name	Release dates			Ep #	Additional information
Name	Region 1	Region 2	Region 4	Ep #	Additional information
Chapter One	March 18, 2008	May 2011	TBA	10	Deleted scenes, Greek: The Initiation, Chapter Two Sneak Peak[sic], Extended Music Sequence, Audio Commentaries
Chapter Two	December 30, 2008	TBA	TBA	12	Bloopers, flashback episode – "And So It Begins", Natural Disaster – music video by the Plain White T's, audio commentaries
Chapter Three	August 18, 2009	TBA	TBA	10	20 questions with the cast of Greek, bloopers, audio commentaries
Chapter Four	March 9, 2010	TBA	TBA	12	Bloopers, Greek recap, At World's End – The Cast and Creators Take You Behind the Scenes for a Look at the Filming of the Final Episode of the Fourth Chapter, How Do You Sleep? – music video by Jesse McCartney, audio commentaries
Chapter Five – The Complete Third Season	January 11, 2011	TBA	TBA	20	A study break with Nora Kirkpatrick ("Katherine"), Cast & crew audio commentaries, "GOTCHA!" featurette, gag reels
Chapter Six – The Complete Fourth and Final Season	October 18, 2011	TBA	TBA	10	Looking back at Greek with the cast, a study break with Aaron Hill ("Beaver"), behind-the-scenes look at the series finale, a very special Q&A
