= Greek (TV series) =

American comedy-drama television series

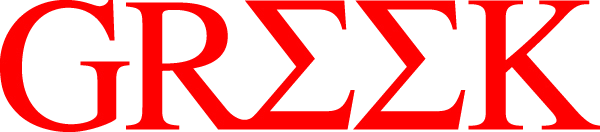
- Genre: Comedy drama
- Created by: Patrick Sean Smith
- Starring: Clark Duke; Tiffany Dupont; Scott Michael Foster; Spencer Grammer; Paul James; Jake McDorman; Amber Stevens; Dilshad Vadsaria; Jacob Zachar
- Theme music composer: Plain White T's
- Opening theme: "Our Time Now" (played on commercials, not during credits)
- Composer: John Swihart
- Country of origin: United States
- Original language: English
- No. of seasons: 4
- No. of episodes: 74 (list of episodes)

Production
- Executive producers: Lloyd Segan; Shawn Piller; Patrick Sean Smith; Anne Kenney; Rob Bragin; John Ziffren
- Producers: Carter Covington; Nellie Nugiel
- Running time: 43 minutes
- Production company: Piller/Segan Company

Original release
- Network: ABC Family
- Release: July 9, 2007 – March 7, 2011

Greek (stylized as GRΣΣK) is an American comedy-drama television series that aired on ABC Family from July 9, 2007, to March 7, 2011. The series follows students of the fictitious Cyprus-Rhodes University (CRU), located in Ohio, who participate in the school's Greek system.

== Plot ==
The show's plots often take place within the confines of the fictional fraternities Kappa Tau Gamma (ΚΤΓ) and Omega Chi Delta (ΩΧΔ), or the fictional sorority Zeta Beta Zeta (ΖΒΖ). Throughout the course of the series, other non-Greek characters and situations are introduced, but they all tie into larger relationships with the Greeks. The series follows brother and sister Rusty and Casey Cartwright as they endure the events surrounding the Greek system at Cyprus-Rhodes. There are six chapters, arranged into four seasons. The series starred Jacob Zachar and Spencer Grammer as the lead characters.

== Cast and characters ==
=== Main cast ===
- Jacob Zachar as Rusty Cartwright, or "Spitter" – A quintessential nerd who comes to CRU to be in the Honors Engineering Program. In season one, he is a freshman who decides to go Greek like his older sister Casey, hoping that it will make him cooler and more confident. He eventually pledges Kappa Tau Gamma.
- Spencer Grammer as Casey Cartwright – Rusty's older sister and a dedicated Zeta Beta Zeta sorority girl. During her junior and senior years at CRU, she must navigate her way through sorority drama and a messy love triangle, all while trying to figure out her future plans.
- Scott Michael Foster as Cappie – The president of Kappa Tau Gamma and Casey's ex-boyfriend from freshman year. Cappie eventually becomes Rusty's "big brother" and introduces him to the rowdy Kappa Tau lifestyle. He loves college and Kappa Tau so much that he never wants to leave, and his immaturity continues to keep him and Casey apart.
- Jake McDorman as Evan Chambers – The Pledge Educator and eventual president of Omega Chi Delta and Casey's ex-boyfriend. Evan comes from a very wealthy family and is entitled to a large trust fund, but he has a troubled relationship with his overbearing parents. Although Evan and Cappie were formerly best friends, the two became bitter enemies after Evan started dating Casey.
- Paul James as Calvin Owens – One of Rusty's first friends in college. Although Calvin decides to pledge Omega Chi and becomes Evan's "little brother", he remains close with Rusty and the Kappa Taus. Calvin is secretly gay when he arrives at college, but he becomes open about his sexuality as he makes friends and bonds with his brothers.
- Amber Stevens as Ashleigh Howard – Casey's best friend since the two met in the laundry room during their freshman year. Ashleigh loves fashion and makeup and is Casey's roommate at the ZBZ house.
- Dilshad Vadsaria as Rebecca Logan – The daughter of a senator who pledges ZBZ during her freshman year. Although she becomes Casey's "little sister", Rebecca is a troublemaker who develops a rivalry with Casey after sleeping with Evan. Rebecca eventually mellows a bit, becoming close with Ashleigh and even mending her relationship with Casey.
- Clark Duke as Dale Kettlewell – Rusty's freshman year roommate. In addition to being a student in the Honors Engineering Program, Dale is a staunch Conservative Southern Baptist and Anti-Greek activist who is critical of Rusty's Greek involvement.

== Production ==
Promotional poster for the series

Filmed primarily in Los Angeles, the show was also filmed on location at the University of California, Los Angeles (UCLA) campus in the Westwood district of Los Angeles. Some scenes were shot at the California Institute of Technology (Caltech) in Pasadena, California and at the University of North Carolina at Chapel Hill in Chapel Hill, North Carolina. The exterior and some interior shots were filmed in West Adams, Los Angeles. The house used in the pilot to establish the ZBZ residence is the same house used in the reality series Beauty and the Geek.

The first season was halted in September 2007 due to the Writers Guild of America strike and returned March 24, 2008, to a triple digit increase in ratings over the pilot's premiere. On May 1, 2008, ABC Family renewed Greek for a second season, premiering August 26, 2008. The series was moved from the Tuesday lineup to Monday nights. Twelve more episodes were ordered for late spring 2009 and aired beginning March 30. On January 31, 2009, it was announced that Greek would return for a third season, premiering on August 31, 2009. The midseason premiere of Greek was Monday, January 25, 2010, at 10/9c.

On February 19, 2010, it was reported that the show had been renewed for a fourth, ten-episode season. Then, on March 13, 2010, creator Sean Smith announced his plans to end the series after the fourth season, saying, "We plan to end, that's the plan. We're all looking at this as an opportunity to come back, wrap up the show, and end strong. ABC Family could have ended it, but they gave us this opportunity and I don't want to squander it." On July 29, 2010, it was confirmed that the fourth and final season of Greek would air beginning in January 2011. The series finale aired on March 7, 2011.

=== Music ===
- Albert Hammond Jr.'s "In Transit" played at the beginning of the Pilot episode
- The Perishers' "Nothing Like You and I" played at the end of Season 1 Episode 15 "Freshman Daze"
- The Plain White T's "Our Time Now" played during commercials advertising Greek during the show's first chapter promotional run. The band has appeared in numerous Greek episodes, making their debut in the season one episode, "The Rusty Nail". They appeared in subsequent episodes "Friday Night Frights", "A New Normal", and "See You Next Time Sisters". The show sometimes features members of the band as KT brothers, such as in the episode "The Great Cappie". The Chapter Two DVD features a video for the band's song, "Natural Disaster", which features Tiffany Dupont.
- The Dollyrots appeared in the season one episode, "Multiple Choice", playing "Because I'm Awesome".
- Marié Digby performs "Better Off Alone" in the penultimate season one episode, "Barely Legal".
- American Bang performs two songs in the season one finale, "Spring Broke": "Wild and Young", and "Move to the Music".
- The War Tapes are the featured band during the season two finale, "At World's End", "Always Falling", and "Dreaming of You".
- Alpha Rev appeared in the season preview performing "Phoenix Burn".
- Zach Selwyn wrote a rap song to promote the third season of Greek in 2009, and shot a music video with the cast of the show.
- The Temper Trap with the song "Sweet Disposition" on the last episode (22) of the second season.
- In chapter 3, "Crush Landing" a Bishop Allen song "Click Click Click Click"
- In one episode (season 3, episode 10 "Friend or Foe?"), before fire in Gamma Psi house, ZBZ singing song "Good Girls Go Bad" (originally performed by Cobra Starship).
- Episode 11 Season 3, when Grant and Calvin are dancing; the music played is "Stay for a While" by The Nikhil Korula Band
- Episode 5 Season 4 when Cappie takes Casey back to ZBZ after the Everest party, the song "Ring of Fire" by Jack Savoretti is played.
- Season 4 Episode 6, when Cappie welcomes Casey to CappieLand, the song "Under the Milky Way" by Sia is played.
- Youth Group with the song "Forever Young" on the finale of Greek (season 4, episode 10)..
- All Time Low's song "Six Feet Under The Stars" was featured in season 3 episode 2
- "Spinning" by Jack's Mannequin in the last episode of season 2 as well as the beginning of the series finale
- When KT had a booth in Season 4 Episode 2, "The Last Summer" by the Forward
- Season Finale when they tore down the Kappa Tau House – "Afterall" by William Fitzsimmons

== Synopsis ==
The pilot episode premiered on Monday, July 9, 2007, in the US on ABC Family. The series finale aired on Monday, March 7, 2011.

Season	Episodes	Season premiere	Season finale	Region 1 DVD release
1	22	July 9, 2007	June 9, 2008	Chapter 1: March 18, 2008; Chapter 2: December 30, 2008
2	22	August 26, 2008	June 15, 2009	Chapter 3: August 18, 2009; Chapter 4: March 9, 2010
3	20	August 31, 2009	March 29, 2010	Chapter 5: January 11, 2011
4	10	January 3, 2011	March 7, 2011	Chapter 6: October 18, 2011

=== Season one ===
==== Chapter one ====
Rusty Cartwright (Jacob Zachar) is a freshman at Cyprus-Rhodes University and in an effort to shed his nerdy image, goes through Greek recruitment to join a fraternity. His older sister Casey (Spencer Grammer) is an active member of the Zeta Beta Zeta sorority (the top sorority on campus), and is dating Omega Chi Delta (the top fraternity on campus) active Evan Chambers (Jake McDorman), who is wealthy and popular because of his father's company, Chambers International. Evan is the Pledge Educator of Omega Chi and offers Rusty a bid during rush. But Rusty declines after he spots Evan cheating on Casey with the Senator's daughter (and Zeta Beta Zeta pledge), Rebecca Logan (Dilshad Vadsaria). Rusty later accepts a bid from Kappa Tau Gamma by the fun and laid-back Cappie (Scott Michael Foster), Casey's ex-boyfriend and Evan's enemy. Additionally, Rusty's religious Baptist roommate, Dale (Clark Duke), is concerned by Rusty's involvement with the Greeks, but later accepts Rusty's new lifestyle, even befriending Rusty's gay friend Calvin (Paul James), an Omega Chi legacy and pledge. After Casey finds out about Evan and Rebecca, Frannie (Tiffany Dupont), ZBZ president and Casey's "big sister", convinces Casey to stay with Evan. Casey sleeps with her ex, Cappie, to get revenge on Evan, but it was just a "one time thing". Rusty and Jen K. (Jessica Rose), a ZBZ pledge, begin dating after they help the Kappa Taus save Vesuvius. Despite all the cheating and tension, Evan lavalieres Casey (gives her his Greek letters). Ashleigh (Amber Stevens), Casey's best friend and fellow ZBZ member, ends her long-distance relationship with boyfriend, Travis, and she attempts to move on to Calvin, who she finds out is gay. He gets accidentally outed by Ashleigh to all of Omega Chi, but Evan encourages him to stay in the fraternity. During the season, Calvin and Heath, a Kappa Tau, have an on-and-off relationship. When Frannie finds out she won't be graduating, she runs for Omega Chi sweetheart again, against Casey. Meanwhile, Cappie and Rebecca begin a flirtatious relationship after doing a psychology experiment together. A large scandal for the Greeks erupts after Jen K. writes a newspaper article based on the scandals and controversies of the Greeks and gets them in trouble with Dean Bowman, forcing the university to lay down strict rules and monitoring on the Greeks. Since Jen K. was a ZBZ pledge, the article centers on the Zeta Beta Zeta sorority and ZBZ National Board interferes and forces Frannie to step down as president and has Casey take her place as interim president. In retaliation, Frannie then tells Evan that the only reason Casey decided to stay with him after he cheated was because of his reputation. As a result, Evan and Casey break up. Rusty and Jen K. also break up because Rusty can no longer trust her.

==== Chapter two ====
Cappie and Rebecca begin a secret romance while Casey and Rusty try to get over their respective exes. The university begins to impose severe restrictions on the Greek system in response to the newspaper article. A ZBZ alumna, Lizzie, comes to live with the sisters to ensure National's standards are enforced. The ZBZs pair up with the Kappa Taus to throw a Gatsby-themed Prohibition party. Rusty has some trouble accepting that he and Calvin are in rival fraternities, but they end up solving their differences in the season finale. Cappie and Rebecca go public about their relationship, which makes Casey uneasy. By accepting Frannie back into the sorority, Lizzie leaves Casey and the rest of the ZBZs. In light of the Greek Ball, there is a flashback to freshman year. Cappie and Evan used to be roommates and decided to rush together. Both were admitted to Kappa Tau, but Evan left after discovering he was only admitted because of Cappie. Cappie and Casey started dating, but Casey was stood up, waiting for Cappie to pick her up for the ball. Frannie confronted Cappie for standing up Casey. But Casey decided to go to the ball with Evan, and the two wound up together by the end of the night. Back in the present, Casey, Ashleigh and Frannie decide to go to the ball together, without dates, and Cappie goes with Rebecca. The season opens up with Greek Week, a competition among the sororities and fraternities. Rebecca decides to coach the Kappa Taus, who find her controlling and rude. Frannie coaches the Omega Chis and Casey coaches the Lambda Sigs. Casey tries to flirt with the Lambda Sig president, but Evan pays him to stay away from Casey. The Kappa Taus protest against the CRU board, with the help of Evan, and the Greeks retain their special treatment on campus. Rusty begins a "fun buddy" relationship with University Students Against Greeks ('USAG') member and Dale's friend, Tina, which ends because Rusty feels uncomfortable having casual sex. After breaking up with her via text message, Rusty learns she had crabs. Meanwhile, Casey attempts to move on from Evan multiple times, all of which were unsuccessful. However, Evan still isn't over Casey and enlists Calvin to prevent other suitors from talking to her. Calvin begins a relationship with Michael (Max Greenfield). Casey tries to become more serious about her future by seeking Evan for help with pre-law. Everyone goes to Myrtle Beach for spring break. There, Ashleigh encounters the "hotness monster" and becomes obsessed with finding him. Rebecca finds out her dad is involved with a prostitution ring and gets extremely drunk. She enters a wet T-shirt concert and ends up breaking up with Cappie since he is "beneath her". Cappie and Casey take a stroll down the beach and end up kissing. However, Cappie realizes what happened to Rebecca and decides to go back and comfort her. Evan and Frannie spark a relationship and Rusty and Calvin work out their differences.

=== Season two ===
==== Chapter three ====
A video of Rebecca's episode from Myrtle Beach goes viral and the ZBZs advise her to lay low. However, Rebecca begins to snap, and national ZBZ rep Tegan advises Casey to remove her. However, Casey and the other ZBZs stand by her side to support Rebecca through her troubling times. Meanwhile, Frannie tries to tell Casey about her and Evan, but Casey finds out after seeing them kissing during the Greek Week championship ceremony. Casey later begins crushing on Drew, who turns out to be Ashleigh's "Hot Ness Monster" from spring break. After fighting over him, neither of them end up with him since he seemed uninterested in Ashleigh and Casey is distracted by Frannie and Evan being together. After "processing" Frannie and Evan's relationship for a while, Casey ultimately decides that she and Frannie cannot be friends since she chose a boy over their friendship. When Rebecca realizes Cappie isn't serious enough to help her cope with her family issues and still isn't over Casey, the two decide to break up. Ashleigh suddenly realizes she has a spending problem and Rusty is in desperate need of a car. So, Casey and Ashleigh recruit Rusty's resident advisor, Max (Michael Rady) to help them count cards and win money at the Omega Chi's casino night. Casey becomes interested in Max, and the two begin dating shortly thereafter. Frannie, Ashleigh and Casey go to Florida for a ZBZ convention, and Frannie successfully overturns a rule concerning a removed officer being prohibited from ever seeking that office again (revealing her intentions to challenge Casey for president). Meanwhile, Calvin cheats on Michael with Heath, and the two break up since Calvin doesn't really know what he wants. Cappie and Rebecca briefly try to be friends with benefits, but she's not entirely over him and he's not entirely over Casey. Casey worries that her geeky boyfriend, Max may jeopardize her presidency campaign, but she later realizes that she cares more about Max than his reputation (unlike Evan). After some ugly politics between Frannie and Casey, Ashleigh unexpectedly wins the ZBZ presidency. Despite her election, Ashleigh has trouble performing her duties with Frannie and Casey both trying to influence her decisions. Meanwhile, Rusty runs into Jen K. and they try to rekindle their relationship, but he realizes he will never get over what she did to the Greeks. In the season finale, Rusty and Calvin both become actives in their respective fraternities, Kappa Tau and Omega Chi. Max gets accepted to Caltech and Casey gets an internship in Washington, D.C. The two seem to decide to split, seeing that a long-distance relationship would not work. And during ZBZ initiation, Frannie announces that she's starting her own sorority, with financial help from Evan, and Rebecca must make a choice between Frannie and the ZBZs.

==== Chapter four ====
Max decided to stay at CRU for grad school to be with Casey. Rebecca becomes a spy for the ZBZs by "joining" Frannie's sorority, the Iota Kappa Iotas, but she gets caught and returns to the ZBZs. Evan becomes president of the Omega Chis and tries to recruit Calvin's high school friend Andy (Jesse McCartney), an all-state football star. New ZBZ president Ashleigh assumes full responsibility by taking over from interim president Casey; however, Casey remains a prominent figure in the house by becoming Rush Chair and Pledge Educator. During rush, Rusty takes a liking to Andy and convinces him to join the Kappa Tau house over the Omega Chi house. Rusty, Dale and Calvin also take an art history elective, and Rusty falls (literally) for a student named Jordan (Johanna Braddy). Jordan attends a Kappa Tau party on invite from Rusty, during which she makes out with Andy and decides to pledge ZBZ. Rusty's situation worsens when Cappie makes Rusty Andy's big brother and Andy and Jordan start dating. Later, Jordan and Rusty kiss, which Rusty admits to Andy, who leaves Kappa Tau. Rusty's betrayal of his little brother infuriates Cappie, who likens the situation to when Evan stole Casey from him. But when Cappie and Evan start reminiscing in their new secret group, the Amphora Society, they decide to put the past behind them and become friends, Cappie ultimately forgives Rusty, who starts dating Jordan after she chooses him over Andy. Meanwhile, Rebecca briefly questions her sexuality after kissing another girl and seeks advice from Calvin. Calvin has trouble resisting his new gay roommate, Grant, and adopts Dale's purity ways to avoid conflict. Frannie keeps taking advantage of Evan's financial support and he starts cheating on her. The two eventually end their relationship, and Evan gives up his trust fund, since it is only causing him issues with others. However, Evan does agree to help Rebecca save her laptop from the impound lot, which leaves viewers questioning whether they'll have a potential future relationship. While everyone else is having relationship issues, Ashleigh begins secretly seeing the ZBZ hasher, Fisher, and the two eventually go public about their relationship. Meanwhile, Casey gets anxious by how fast her relationship with Max is progressing, after finding out he turned down Caltech for her. Max tries to lavaliere her, but the two agree to take it slow. He leaves for an internship in Oxford and they try to maintain a long-distance relationship. But, Casey struggles with her feelings for Cappie, forcing Casey and Cappie to end their friendship. In the season finale, The Iota Kappa Iota house is disbanded by Frannie after she finally graduates from CRU. Inspired by the Kappa Tau's "End of the World" party, Dale and Calvin ditch their purity pledges and pursue their respective lovers. Unable to bury her feelings for Cappie, Casey tries to reconnect with Cappie, only for him to reject her. So, Casey breaks up with Max, because she realizes she'll never feel the same with him as she does with Cappie.

=== Season three ===
==== Chapter five ====
The season begins shortly after homecoming of the academic year 2009–2010. Max leaves CRU after realizing that Casey was his main reason for staying. It is revealed that Cappie intended to get Casey back at the "End of the World Party", but Evan talked him out of it. Meanwhile, Casey discovers that Rebecca and Fisher made out at the party, which eventually leads to the end of Ashleigh and Fisher's relationship. Later in the season, the two get back together. Additionally, Dale loses his virginity to his landlady Sheila (Kristen O'Meara), causing him to doubt his religious faith. Casey takes an active role as the ZBZ rep for Panhellenic, where she is forced to interact with Evan and clashes with Katherine (Nora Kirkpatrick), the Panhellenic president. Rusty struggles academically, but he gets a professor to sponsor a special project. Calvin and his roommate/fellow Omega Chi brother Grant (Gregory Michael) quietly begin a relationship. Evan discovers their romance, but he helps them keep it a secret from the rest of the Omega Chis until Grant is ready to publicly come out as being gay. Rusty and Jordan become more serious; they finally have sex, and Rusty lavalieres her. However, they eventually break up when Jordan becomes disillusioned with university life and decides to leave CRU and move to New York City to pursue a photography internship. Casey discovers Cappie and Evan's secret friendship when she intrudes upon a secret society meeting, and the three temporarily become friends again. Dale briefly gets back together with Sheila once they reunite at a Comic Con convention. Ashleigh and Evan, as Greek presidents, both have trouble controlling their houses. When Thanksgiving rolls around, Cappie confesses his feelings for Casey and the two finally get back together, which ruins the fragile friendship between Cappie, Casey, and Evan. Meanwhile, tension builds between Dale and Rusty when they compete for an academic grant, which Rusty ultimately wins. Rusty discovers that his nerdy classmate Dana (Martha MacIsaac) has a crush on him, but he blows his chance by acting too cocky and she refuses to go out with him. Later, she becomes his lab assistant. Cappie and Evan decide to bring their houses together for a major campus prank, but Evan betrays Cappie because he resents Cappie's relationship with Casey and hopes to regain control of his Omega Chi brothers. As a result of the prank, three Kappa Taus, including Wade (Derek Mio), are expelled. Evan seeks comfort from Rebecca after he and Cappie end their friendship, which sparks a relationship between them. After the drama with IKI, ZBZ is knocked down to being the fourth-best sorority, with Gamma Psi taking first. After the ZBZs suspiciously lose a Songfest competition, the ZBZ girls decide to investigate the Gamma Psi house for evidence of cheating. Rebecca accidentally leaves a candle burning, causing the Gamma Psi house to burn down. Although ZBZ tries to keep it a secret, Casey eventually breaks down and tells Katherine what happened, after finding out that Natalie, the Gamma Psi president, slept with one of the Songfest judges. The confession ends her new friendship with Katherine, but Casey gets a position on the Panhellenic Board as vice-president judicial ('VPJ'), inspiring Casey to seriously consider law school and a future in politics. Ashleigh discovers that Fisher cheated on her again, so they break up for good, and Dale is hired as the new ZBZ hasher. Rusty briefly dates Katherine, and she asks him to take her virginity, but Rusty turns her down and eventually breaks up with her in order to pursue a relationship with his lab assistant, Dana. Grant and Calvin also break up because Grant wants to experience what being single is like. Rebecca and Evan begin to get more serious, and he gives her an expensive necklace. When Calvin hints that Evan sees a future for them, Rebecca freaks out and sleeps with Beaver. During Mardi Gras, Evan sees Rebecca kiss another guy at a bar, and they break up. Rebecca introduces Casey to Joel (Samuel Page), who works in politics, and Casey begins to get some political experience and prepare for law school. After she takes the LSAT, Joel tries to kiss her, but she rebuffs him and says that she has a boyfriend. Casey begins to question her relationship with Cappie because he refuses to talk about the future and wants to stay at CRU forever, while Casey is starting to think seriously about the future. In the final episode of the season, Cappie breaks up with Casey for not having enough faith in their relationship.

=== Season four ===
==== Chapter six ====
Casey, Ashleigh, and Evan graduate, while Calvin and Rebecca adjust to their new duties as presidents. After some investigation, Casey discovers the real reasons behind not getting into CRU Law, and with a successful appeal stays at CRU as a law student and the ZBZ housemother. Ashleigh returns to the ZBZ house saying she was fired from her job in New York, only to have it revealed later that she was sent on a coffee run one day and left, and came back to CRU because she was lonely and disliked her job. Meanwhile, Cappie tries to get back with Casey, and after telling him that maybe they can go back the way they were, Cappie promises that he will change so that someday he is worthy of being her boyfriend. Calvin deals with the ramifications of lying to become president of Omega Chi, as well as his relationship with Heath. After an inspiring talk with Evan, Dale rushes Omega Chi. The Kappa Tau brothers lose all of their pledges except one: Peter Parkes, a KT legacy whose father is Lasker Parkes, creator of the 'Joshua Whopper' software (named in episode 2x04). Since declaring a major, philosophy, Cappie decides to graduate that semester to be with Casey. Ashleigh has a brief relationship with Casey and Evan's law professor, but broke it off because they had different expectations of each other. Ashleigh then takes a marketing job with her past professor and began a relationship with Rusty. Rebecca and Evan break up and end up as friends. After discovering that Omega Chi was trying to use him to get to Kappa Tau, Dale is kicked out of the fraternity. He is later reinstated after Calvin and the pledges stand up to the new president on Dale's behalf. Dale gets back together with Laura, and Katherine and Beaver start dating. After it is revealed that Lasker Parkes wants to destroy Kappa Tau's house to build a sports facility, a protest takes place to save the house. Casey, Evan, and Cappie all make amends and Cappie announced Rusty as the new Kappa Tau president. The Kappa Tau house is torn down, but Rusty pledges to find a new better house. Casey quits CRU Law to go to Washington with Cappie, who graduated. In the final scene the group says goodbye to Casey and Cappie before they leave for Washington.

=== Specials ===
In the United Kingdom, episodes were followed by special behind-the-scenes features entitled Greek Uncovered, which were available on BBC iPlayer and aired on BBC Three.

== Release ==
=== Home media ===
In 2008, ABC/Disney released Season One on DVD in two volumes, titled Chapter One and Chapter Two. In 2009, Season Two was also released on DVD in two volumes, titled Chapter Three and Chapter Four.

In 2010, Shout! Factory secured the rights for the rest of the series and released Season Three on DVD as a complete set, titled Chapter Five: The Complete Third Season. On October 18, 2011, Shout! Factory released Greek: Chapter Six – The Complete Fourth Season as a Shout! Select title, available exclusively on their website.

DVD release dates for Greek
Name	Release dates			Ep #	Additional information
Name	Region 1	Region 2	Region 4	Ep #	Additional information
Chapter One	March 18, 2008	May 2011	TBA	10	Deleted scenes, Greek: The Initiation, Chapter Two Sneak Peek, Extended Music Sequence, Audio Commentaries
Chapter Two	December 30, 2008	TBA	TBA	12	Bloopers, Flashback Episode – "And So It Begins", Natural Disaster – Music Video by the Plain White T's, Audio Commentaries
Chapter Three	August 18, 2009	TBA	TBA	10	20 Questions with the Cast of Greek, Bloopers, Audio Commentaries
Chapter Four	March 9, 2010	TBA	TBA	12	Bloopers, Greek Recap, At World's End – The Cast and Creators Take You Behind the Scenes for a Look at the Filming of the Final Episode of the Fourth Chapter, How Do You Sleep? – Music Video by Jesse McCartney, Audio Commentaries
Chapter Five – The Complete Third Season	January 11, 2011	TBA	TBA	20	A Study Break with Nora Kirkpatrick ("Katherine"), Cast & Crew Audio Commentaries, GOTCHA! Featurette, Gag Reels, And More!
Chapter Six – The Complete Fourth and Final Season	October 18, 2011	TBA	TBA	10	Looking Back at Greek with the Cast, A Study Break with Aaron Hill ("Beaver"), Behind-the-Scenes Look at the Series Finale, A Very Special Q&A

== Reception ==
=== Critical response ===
On review aggregator Rotten Tomatoes, the first season has an approval rating of 50% based on 10 reviews, with an average rating of 5.70/10. The website's critical consensus reads, "Greek's first season forges an uneven path, its attempts to accurately portray fun college shenanigans are marred by an overt cheesiness and predictability that makes it hard to pledge to an entire season." Metacritic, which uses a weighted average, assigned a score of 62 out of 100 based 8 reviews, indicating "generally favorable reviews".

Pittsburgh Post-Gazette asserted, "There are plenty of soapy twists to "Greek" with competing frat boys after Casey's affection, the outta-nowhere, down-low life of a freshman frat pledge and Rusty's attempts to protect Casey's honor, but writer/creator Patrick Sean Smith ("Everwood", "Wildfire") gives "Greek" a greater sense of light-hearted fun that seems more authentic to the real-world experience of college as the best years." Ginia Bellafante of The New York Times stated, "Gilmore Girls offered a more realistic depiction of college life (and "The Best Years" on N offers one that's more fun), but "Greek" captures the spirit of the hedge-fund age like nothing else." David Wiegand of SFGATE called the writing of the first episode "competent" and said the show has "some funny moments", stating, saying, "Thanks largely to the cast, viewers are likely to give "Greek" a chance for a while and, if the show is able to break free of its influences, perhaps even longer."

Kelly West of CinemaBlend called the show "worth watching", stating, "There are some laugh-out-loud moments and a fair amount of interesting character arcs that could play out well. I think this series is probably going to appeal more to teenagers but there's a humorous side to it that makes it enjoyable for grown-ups as well." Alison Herman of The Ringer described Greek as "TV's Gold Standard for the College Experience," asserting, "Greek cracked the college TV show in a way no series had before or has since, in part by focusing on an iconic, dramatically heightened subset of college life." Greek's has been noted for the inclusion of character Calvin, a gay fraternity brother, who struggles with the stereotyping and homophobia that coming out of the closet entails. Critics have praised the "three dimensionality" of the character.

Elizabeth Fox of The Philadelphia Inquirer found the show predictable and called it a "teenage soap opera" that lacks originality. Members of the real life Greek community have claimed that Greek's depiction of fraternity and sorority life is stereotypical. The University of Southern California banned the show from filming on their campus, in reaction to the promotional poster featuring the Greek logo over a red cup, since the cup is often used to symbolize alcoholic consumption during parties. However, upon viewing the pilot episode they held off on sending a letter to ABC Family, complaining about the depiction of the Greek System, when they realized there was more to the show than just parties. Others recognize it as a hyperbolic representation of "tamer, more modest" Greek life.

=== Ratings ===
The viewership for Greek's pilot episode was 1.1 million, and Chapter Two ended with 1.3 million viewers.

Chapter Three saw a ratings spike, premiering to 1.6 million viewers, a 78% increase, doubling and tripling their ratings in all demographics, marked a network high for male viewers, and was the second most watched cable show with females age 12–34. Greek also appeared on the list of top ten downloads on iTunes. Chapter Four premiered much lower, with 0.99 million viewers, and ended with 0.745 million.

The third-season premiere (Chapter Five) had a total of 1.21 million viewers, down almost two million from its lead in, The Secret Life of the American Teenager. The second episode pulled in 1.31 million viewers. Chapter Five ended with 0.66 million viewers and Chapter Six premiered with 1.033 million.

=== Accolades ===
Year	Award	Category	Nominee(s)	Result	Ref.
2008	GLAAD Media Awards	Outstanding Comedy Series	Greek	Nominated	
2009	NAACP Image Awards	Outstanding Actor in a Comedy Series	Paul James	Nominated	
2009	GLAAD Media Awards	Outstanding Comedy Series	Greek	Nominated	
2010	GLAAD Media Awards	Outstanding Comedy Series	Greek	Nominated	
2010	NAMIC Vision Awards	Best Performance – Comedy	Dilshad Vadsaria	Nominated	
2011	GLAAD Media Awards	Outstanding Comedy Series	Greek	Nominated	
