= Jalen Huskey =

American football player (born 2003)

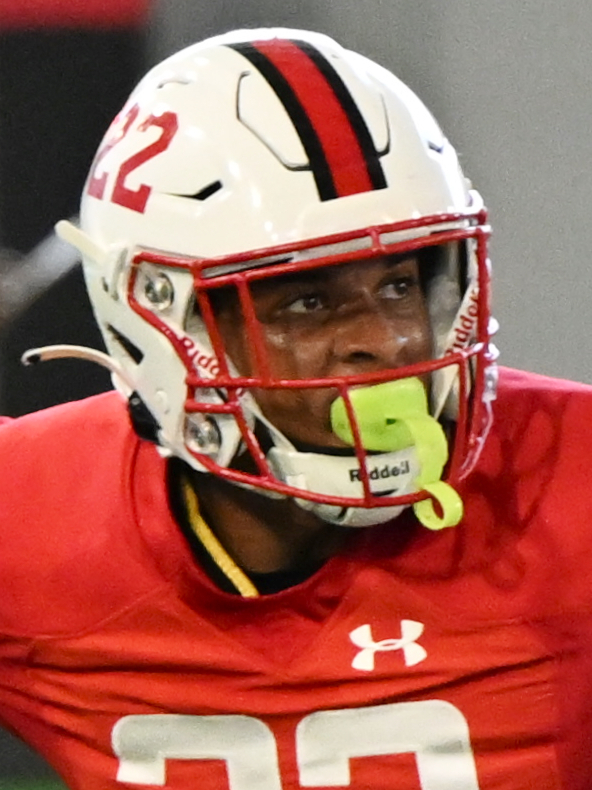
- Huskey with the Maryland Terrapins in 2024

No. 22 – Jacksonville Jaguars
- Position: Safety
- Roster status: Active

Personal information
- Born: May 10, 2003 (age 23); Frederick, Maryland, U.S.
- Listed height: 6 ft 1 in (1.85 m)
- Listed weight: 201 lb (91 kg)

Career information
- High school: Quince Orchard (Gaithersburg, Maryland)
- College: Bowling Green (2022–2023); Maryland (2024–2025)
- NFL draft: 2026: 3rd round, 100th overall pick

Career history
- Jacksonville Jaguars (2026–present)

Awards and highlights
- First-team All-MAC (2023); Second-team All-Big Ten (2025)

Career NFL statistics as of Week 8, 2026
- Total tackles: 3
- Sacks: 1
- Stats at Pro Football Reference

Jalen Huskey (born May 10, 2003) is an American professional football safety for the Jacksonville Jaguars of the National Football League (NFL). He played college football for the Bowling Green Falcons and Maryland Terrapins and was selected by the Jaguars in the third round of the 2026 NFL draft.

== Early life ==
Huskey was born on May 10, 2003, and grew up in Frederick, Maryland, raised by both his father and mother. He is one of 13 children. Huskey started playing football at age four. He first attended Middletown High School where he played as a wide receiver and cornerback, reaching the Class 2A state championship as a sophomore while leading the state with 13 interceptions and being named second-team all-state. Huskey later transferred to Quince Orchard High School where he was named the Montgomery All-County 4A Defensive Player of the Year as a senior, helping Quince Orchard to a perfect record of 14–0 and a win in the Class 4A state title game. He was ranked a three-star recruit and committed to play college football for the Bowling Green Falcons.

== College career ==
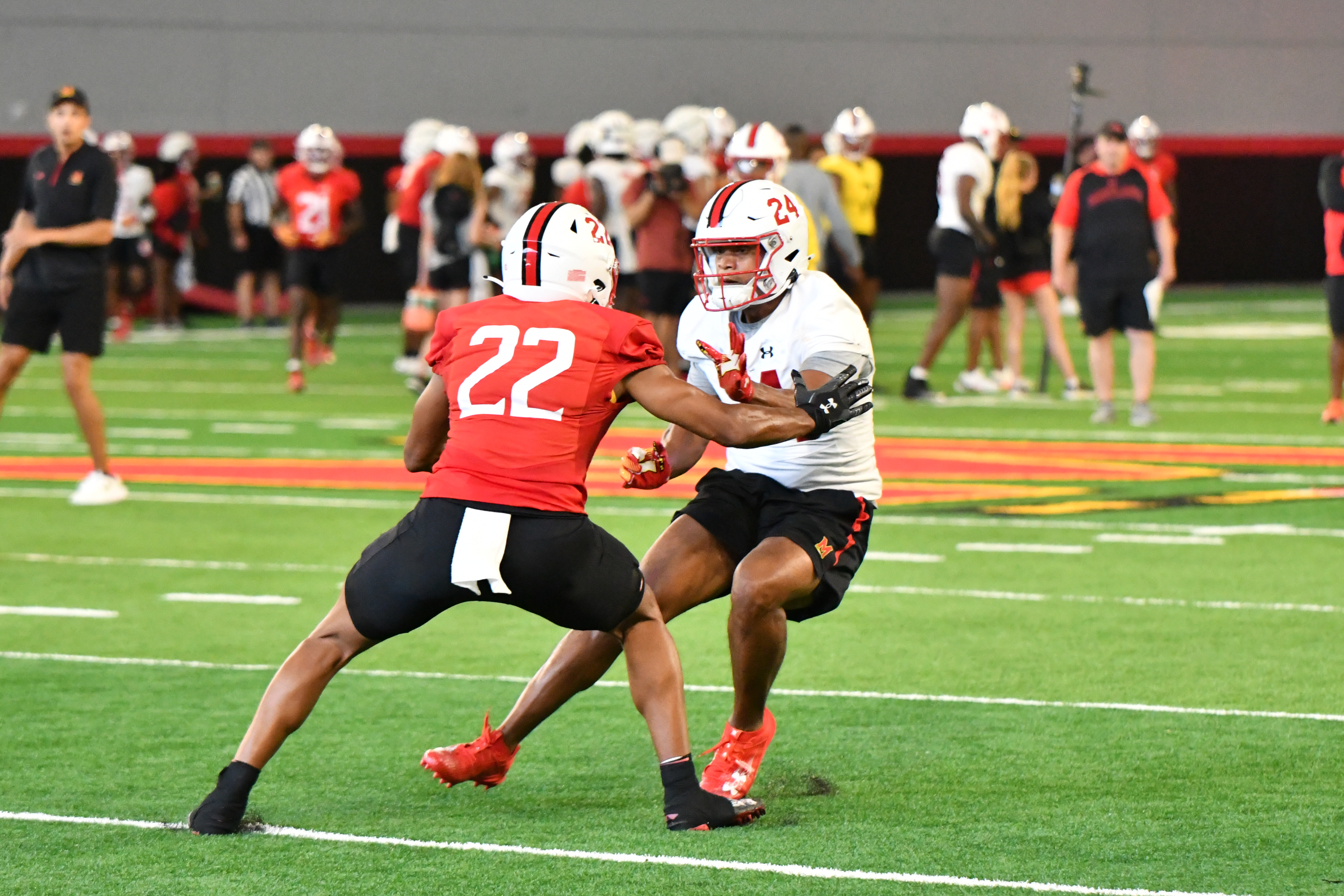
Huskey and Maryland governor Wes Moore at practice, 2024

As a true freshman at Bowling Green in 2022, Huskey appeared in nine games as a backup and posted seven tackles. He then started all 12 games in 2023, earning first-team All-Mid-American Conference (MAC) honors after recording 52 tackles, six pass breakups and team-leading four interceptions. Huskey transferred to the Maryland Terrapins in 2024 and changed his position to safety, as he had previously been a cornerback. He posted 45 tackles, four passes defended and three interceptions during the 2024 season. As a senior in 2025, Huskey served as team captain and was named Maryland's Defensive Player of the Year, recording 72 tackles and four interceptions while earning second-team All-Big Ten Conference honors. He was invited to the 2026 East–West Shrine Bowl and to the NFL Scouting Combine.

== Professional career ==
Pre-draft measurables
Height	Weight	Arm length	Hand span	Wingspan	40-yard dash	10-yard split	20-yard split	20-yard shuttle	Three-cone drill	Vertical jump	Broad jump	Bench press
6 ft 1 1/4 in (1.86 m)	196 lb (89 kg)	30 7/8 in (0.78 m)	10 1/4 in (0.26 m)	6 ft 3 3/4 in (1.92 m)	4.55 s	1.54 s	2.66 s	4.30 s	7.20 s	36.5 in (0.93 m)	10 ft 1 in (3.07 m)	11 reps
All values from NFL Combine/Pro Day

Huskey was selected by the Jacksonville Jaguars in the third round, 100th overall, of the 2026 NFL draft.
