= Quince Orchard High School =

Location
- 15800 Quince Orchard Road; Gaithersburg, Maryland 20878; United States; 39°6′56″N 77°15′15″W

Information
- Type: Public secondary
- Established: September 6, 1988; 38 years ago
- School district: Montgomery County Public Schools
- CEEB code: 210564
- NCES School ID: 240048001509
- Principal: Dr. Irina LaGrange
- Teaching staff: 130.76 (on an FTE basis)
- Grades: 9–12
- Gender: Coeducational
- Enrollment: 2,154 (2022–23)
- Student to teacher ratio: 16.47
- Campus: Suburban
- Colors: Red, black, and white
- Mascot: Cougar
- Rival: Northwest High School; Damascus High School
- Newspaper: The Prowler
- Yearbook: Tracks
- Website: www.montgomeryschoolsmd.org/schools/qohs/
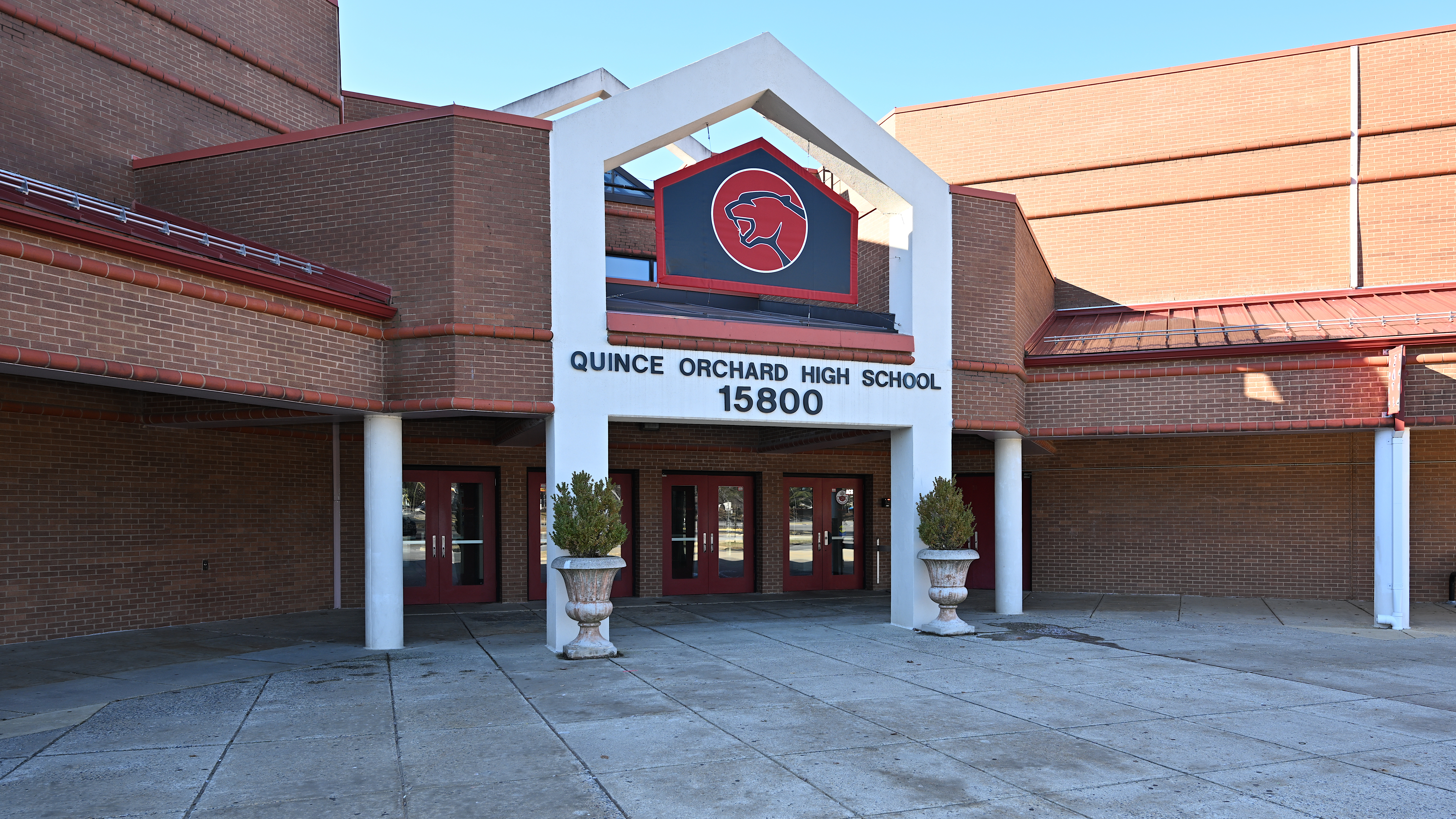

Quince Orchard High School (QOHS), also known as Q.O. High School, is a secondary school located on Quince Orchard Road in the Quince Orchard neighborhood of Gaithersburg in Montgomery County, Maryland, United States.

== Academics ==
According to materials from the school, Quince Orchard "encourages advanced studies in both the arts and books." To this end, 31 Advanced Placement courses are offered, ranging from the arts to world history to science and math. The school boasts higher-than-average SAT (562 verbal, 542 math) and ACT (22 composite) scores, and requires 75 hours of community service for graduation.

In 2006, Quince Orchard High School was the 456th highest-rated school according to Newsweek magazine's list of the top 1,300 high schools in the United States.

In 2014, Quince Orchard was ranked the sixth best high school in the state of Maryland and 176th in the United States by U.S. News & World Report on their list of best high schools. In 2024, QO fell to 69th in Maryland and 3807th in the US.

== Arts and sports ==
Over the years, the theater department has staged nearly 50 productions, including Up the Down Staircase and the musical Grease.

Students produce The Prowler newspaper and the yearbook Tracks.

The Quince Orchard High School Marching Band went to the inaugural USSBA National Championship and achieved a Montgomery County-record score of 90.275. The next year, the band received their second record-breaking score for Montgomery County, Maryland, of 92.325, and placed 9th out of 18 national groups. In 2008, the marching band won the USSBA Group IV Open Maryland State Championships with the show "Jekyll and Hyde.” More recently, the varsity football team won the 2022 Maryland State Championship. The Cougars also won the Maryland State Championship in 1991 and 2007, and were in the quarterfinals in 1993. Quince Orchard has won 5 football state championships and have made it to the championship game a total of 9 times.

=== Rivals ===
Quince Orchard's success in football has created a rivalry with Northwest, a school that is both close in proximity and has seen similar success on the football field. They also have a rivalry with Damascus.

== Athletics ==
Quince Orchard High School has one of the best athletic programs in the county.

=== Football ===
Quince Orchard has a top football program in the state. They have won 7 state championships, in 1991, 2007, 2018, 2021, 2022, 2024, and 2025

== Student demographics ==
For the 2022–2023 school year, Quince Orchard had a total enrollment of 2,154 students. The school's student body was 34.4% non-Hispanic white, 16.3% African American, 10.9% Asian American, and 33.5% Hispanic and Latino American.

== Zone ==
Quince Orchard's incoming freshmen come from Lakelands Park and Ridgeview Middle School. Until the end of the 2007 school year, Quince Orchard also enrolled students who had graduated from Kingsview Middle School. The school serves students living in Gaithersburg and North Potomac. The feeder patterns of schools articulating to Quince Orchard goes as follows:

- Lakelands Park MS
  - Brown Station ES
  - Rachel Carson ES
- Ridgeview MS
  - Diamond ES
  - Fields Road ES
  - Jones Lane ES
  - Thurgood Marshall ES

Elementary school split articulations:

- Most of Diamond ES articulates to Lakelands Park MS and Northwest HS

=== Expected boundary changes ===
As of the 2023-24 school year, QOHS projects to be over-enrolled for the next 15 years with its current attendance zones. To address these concerns, along with overutilization among other nearby schools, the county is conducting a boundary study for the new Crown High School, which has an expected completion date of August 2027.

== History ==
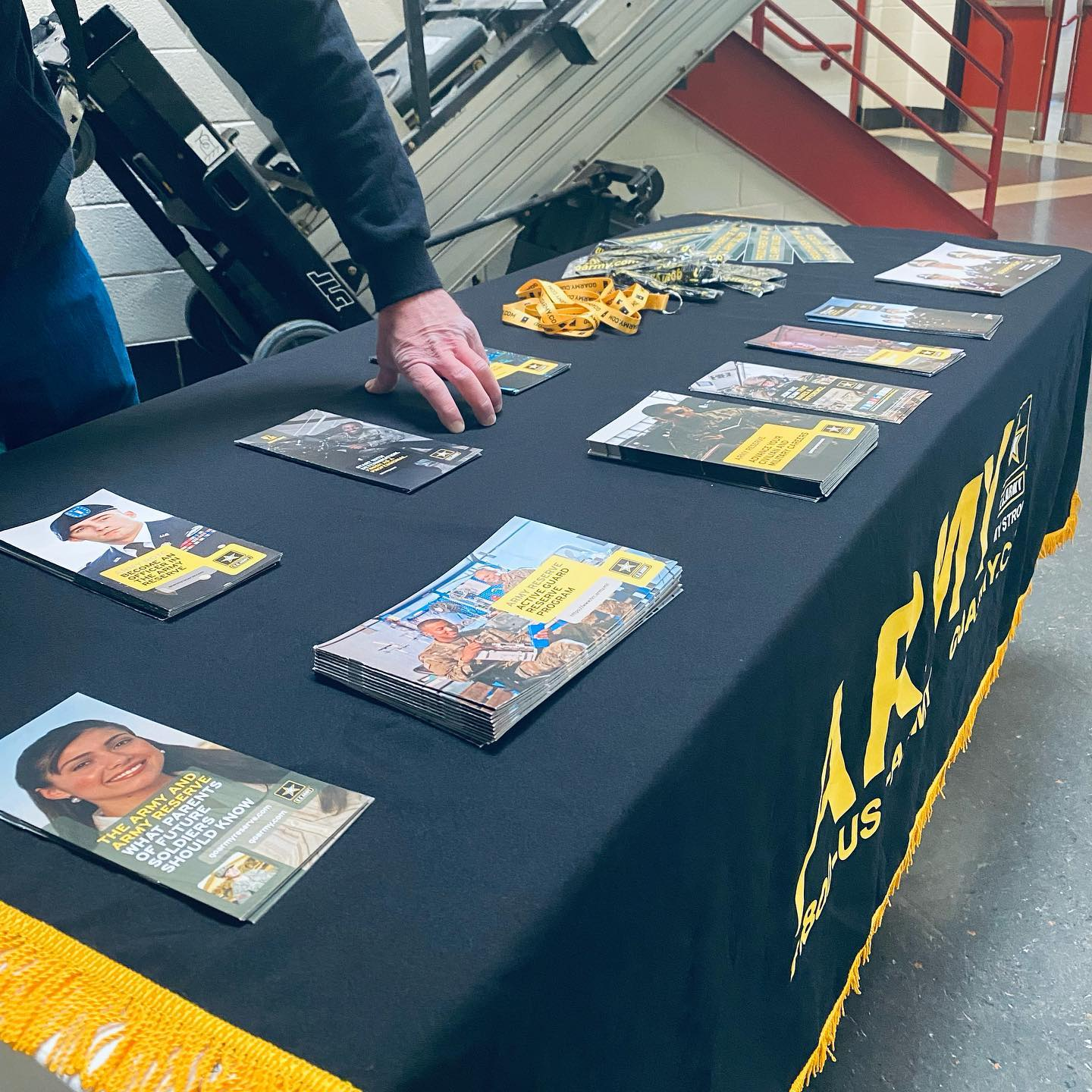
U.S. Army recruiter at QOHS in 2022

In 1984, the Montgomery County Council voted to build Quince Orchard High School in order to reduce crowding at Gaithersburg High School, and it allocated $20 million for its construction in 1984. The school was expected to have 1,680 students upon opening, and it was designed to have a capacity of 2,000 students. In 1987, a group of parents asked the Board of Education to name the school Potomac Falls High School instead, but the Board of Education decided to name it Quince Orchard High School because it was being built on Quince Orchard Road. Construction costs ended up totaling $26 million by the time the school opened on September 6, 1988.

Quince Orchard High School did not have a senior class during its first school year open, which made it difficult for its athletic teams to compete with other high schools in sports where size and experience are particularly advantageous. Its football team's record was 1-8 in its first season. The softball field was not built in time for the first school year, and the school used the baseball field for field hockey. Tennis courts were not completed until midway through the first school year, and the team finished 5-7 that year.

Quince Orchard became the first public school in the state of Maryland to have a Sports Broadcasting Network in 2019. The QO Sports Network, founded by student Adam Gotkin, broadcasts select Quince Orchard athletic events.

On October 24, 2025, a water main on the first floor broke, flooding parts of the school and triggering an early dismissal. Students were brought to the cougar dome, and the situation was resolved using cleaning crews and a thorough inspection.

== Notable alumni ==
- Jason Ankrah, NFL football player
- Baiyu, singer
- Jarell Broxton, football player
- Jared Bush, director & film writer
- Greg Chimera, collegiate football coach
- Astrid Ellena, Miss Indonesia 2011, Indonesia's representative in Miss World 2011 (Top 15)
- Ashley Blaine Featherson, Dear White People (TV series), Dear White People actress
- Johnny Hodges, professional football linebacker for the Winnipeg Blue Bombers
- Jalen Huskey, NFL safety for the Jacksonville Jaguars
- Paul James, actor
- Zach Kerr, NFL football player
- Charles Lee, basketball coach
- John Papuchis, college football coach
- Chetan Puttagunta, General Partner at Benchmark Capital
- Chop Robinson, NFL defensive end for the Miami Dolphins
- Jesse Tittsworth, DJ/Producer
- Wale, rapper
- Darnell Wilson, boxer
- Mary Wiseman, Star Trek: Discovery actress
- Sahara Davenport, RuPaul's Drag Race
