= Lakelands Park =

Park in Gaithersburg, Maryland

Coordinates: 39°6′56″N 77°14′9″W

Lakelands Park is a park located in the Lakelands neighborhood of the City of Gaithersburg, Montgomery County, Maryland. The park includes two baseball/softball fields, a playground, and a large grassy area usually used for soccer. This park is located next to Lakelands Park Middle School.

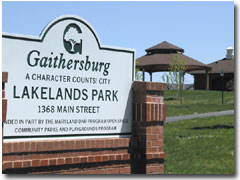
The sign for Lakelands Park
