= Lakelands Park Middle School =

Public middle school in Gaithersburg, Maryland, US

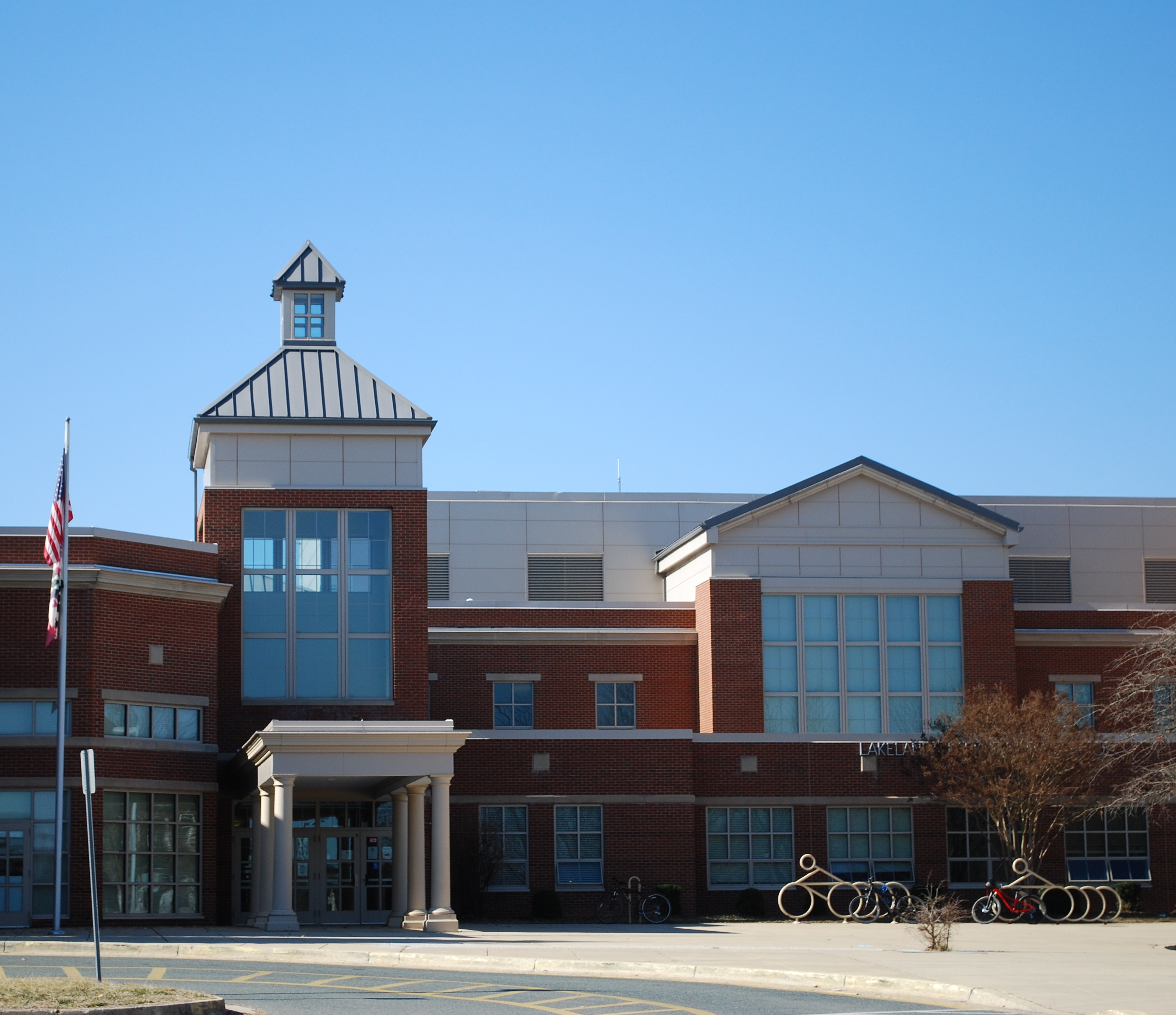

Location
- 1200 Main Street; Gaithersburg, Maryland 20878; United States; 39°6′53.8″N 77°13′55.4″W

Information
- Type: Middle school
- Motto: Purposeful, Measurable, Successful
- Established: 2005
- School district: Montgomery County Public Schools
- NCES District ID: 2400480
- Principal: Rose S. Alvarez
- Faculty: 78
- Grades: 6–8
- Enrollment: 1,182 (2020–2021)
- Student to teacher ratio: 15.12 (2020-2021)
- Colors: Blue and silver
- Mascot: The Falcon
- Publication: The Falcon Times, The Falcon Flier

Lakelands Park Middle School is a public middle school located in Gaithersburg, Maryland, United States. Managed by Montgomery County Public Schools, the school educates over 1,000 students in grades 6-8. The school was named after Lakelands Park, which is adjacent to the school. With its premises used regularly for community events, the school has a high local profile.

Rose S. Alvarez is the school's principal. She took over from Deborah R. Higdon, who left during the summer of 2020.

== The school ==
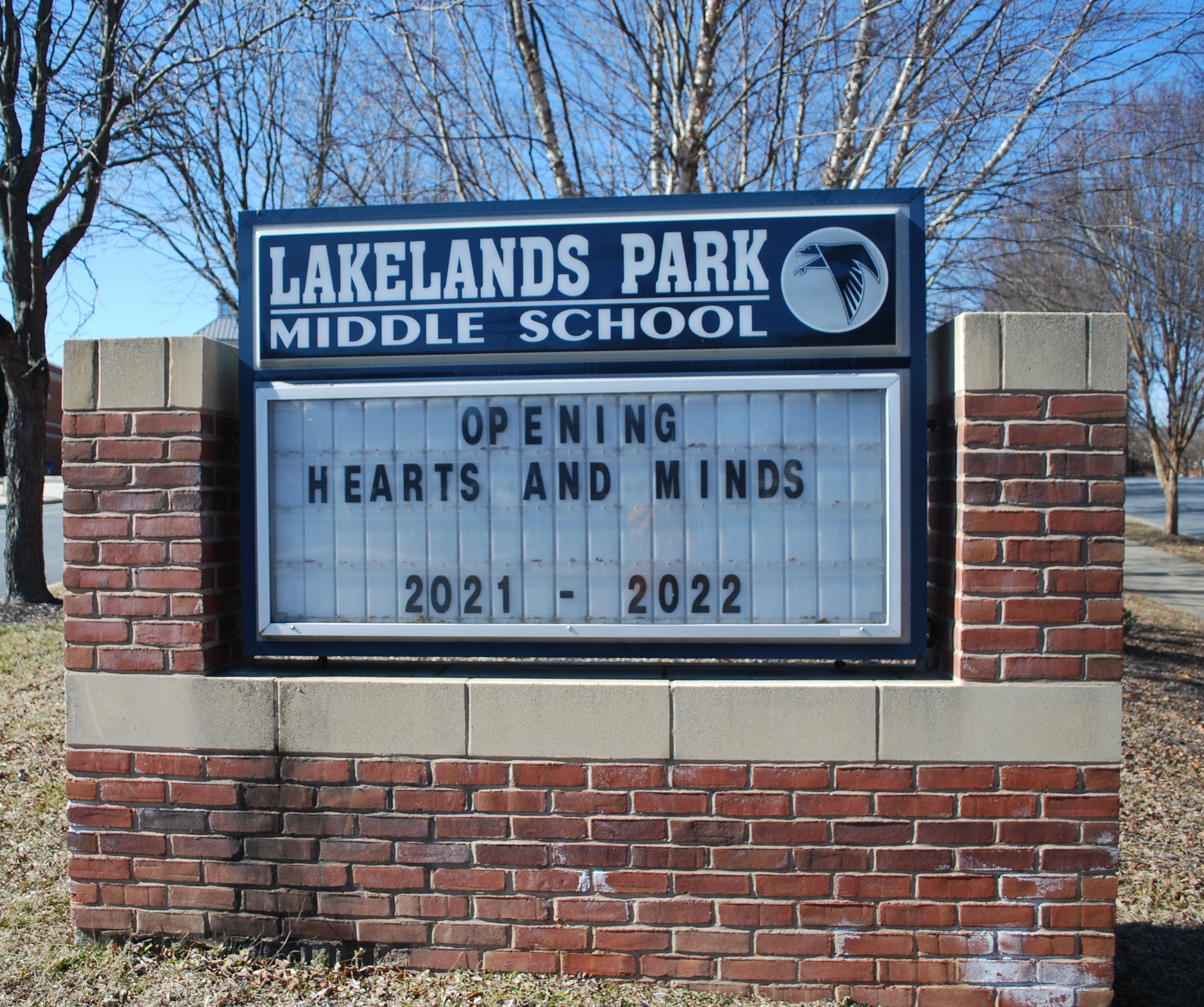
The school's sign

Lakelands Park Middle School was built in 2005 to resolve overcrowding in other schools in the county, as a result of a unique collaborative effort between the Montgomery County Board of Education and superintendent Dr. Jerry Weast, at a cost of $21 million. Lakelands was designed to accommodate up to 1,200 students and is located amongst local housing to enable the students to be able to walk to school. The building, set on a 11.6 acre site, is 153,588 square feet (14,268.8 m^{2}), and includes three floors, a full-size gym, auxiliary gyms, two computer labs, and rooms for art, music and technology. The media center has a collection of more than 18,000 print and non-print materials, including books, magazines, videos, DVDs and CD ROMs. The Research Learning Hub includes 32 networked computers.

The school set ambitious academic targets, including 100% of the students reading at or above grade level by the time they leave the school. However, the school was soon placed on the state watch list due to poor results.

Following the decision of the Montgomery County school board to allow cell phones in schools other than high schools, Lakelands was one of four selected to trial this arrangement in August 2007.

In the 2018 annual assessment for Maryland schools, Lakelands Park received four stars out of a possible five as a measurement of overall effectiveness.

=== Feeder patterns ===
After students graduate from 8th grade, the high school they go on to depends on the elementary school they attended. Students move to Quince Orchard High School if they went to Brown Station or Rachel Carson Elementary schools, and those who went to Darnestown Elementary School attend Northwest High School. If students went to Diamond Elementary School, they either attend Quince Orchard High School if their home is south of Great Seneca Highway, or Northwest High School if their home is north of Great Seneca Highway. Now due to the boundary study all 8th graders graduating highschool in 2031 and later will feed into Quince Orchard High School

== Autism pilot ==
Montgomery County Public Schools are pioneering a pilot, in Lakelands Park, for autistic students using the controversial Rapid Prompting Method.

== Sports and extracurricular activities ==
=== Sport ===
Lakelands Park has competitive teams in boys' and girls' softball, boys' and girls' basketball, boys' and girls' soccer, and coeducational cross country team. Lakelands Park's main local rival is Ridgeview.

The city constructed a synthetic turf sports field, at a cost of just under $950,000, in the adjacent Lakelands Park. The field opened in October 2014. Initially there was no public access but, in May 2015, it was announced that the field would be available to the community on Saturday and Sunday afternoons. However, due to on-street parking because of the absence of car parking facilities and litter issues, the use of this facility has caused what residents call "quality of life issues".

Student Sara Mercer was selected to represent the United States in China at the 2016 Acrobatic Gymnastics World Championships.

They have an annual flag football tournament near Memorial Day, called Bittner Day, honoring Matthew W. Bittner, a teacher at the school who died in 2011.

=== Music and theatre ===
The Lakelands Park Theatre, the school's drama club, wrote and gave a public performance of an original drama, Pirate School!, in February 2008.
