= Kentlands, Gaithersburg, Maryland =

Kentlands, Maryland
- Neighborhood of Gaithersburg
- Kentlands Citizens Assembly
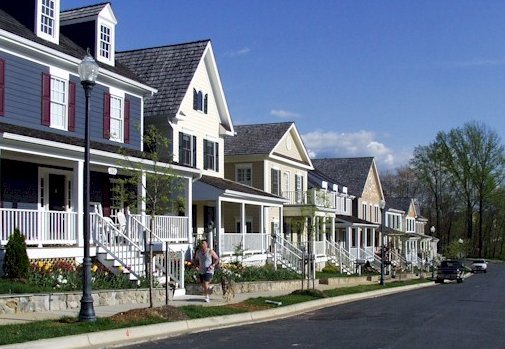
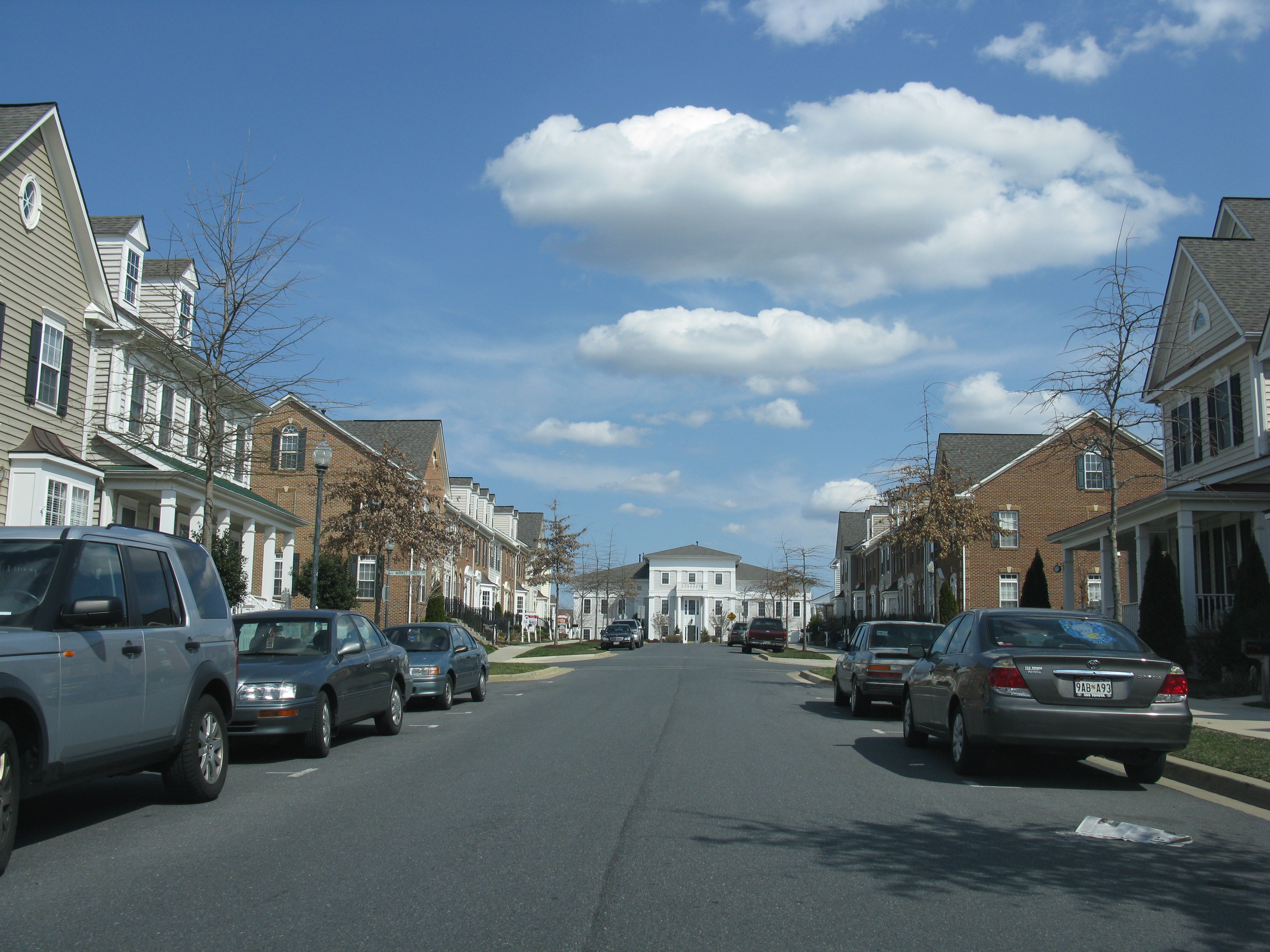
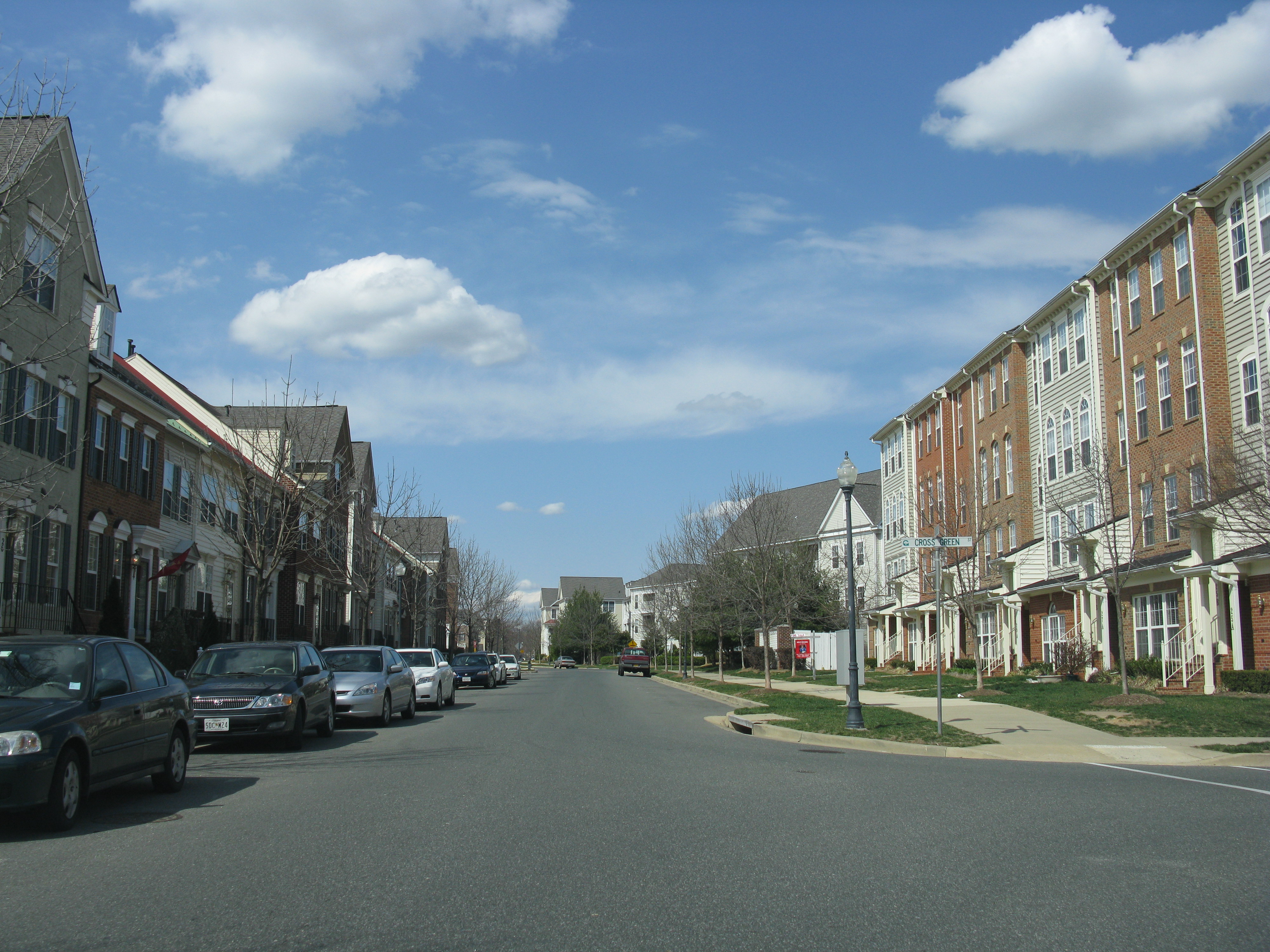
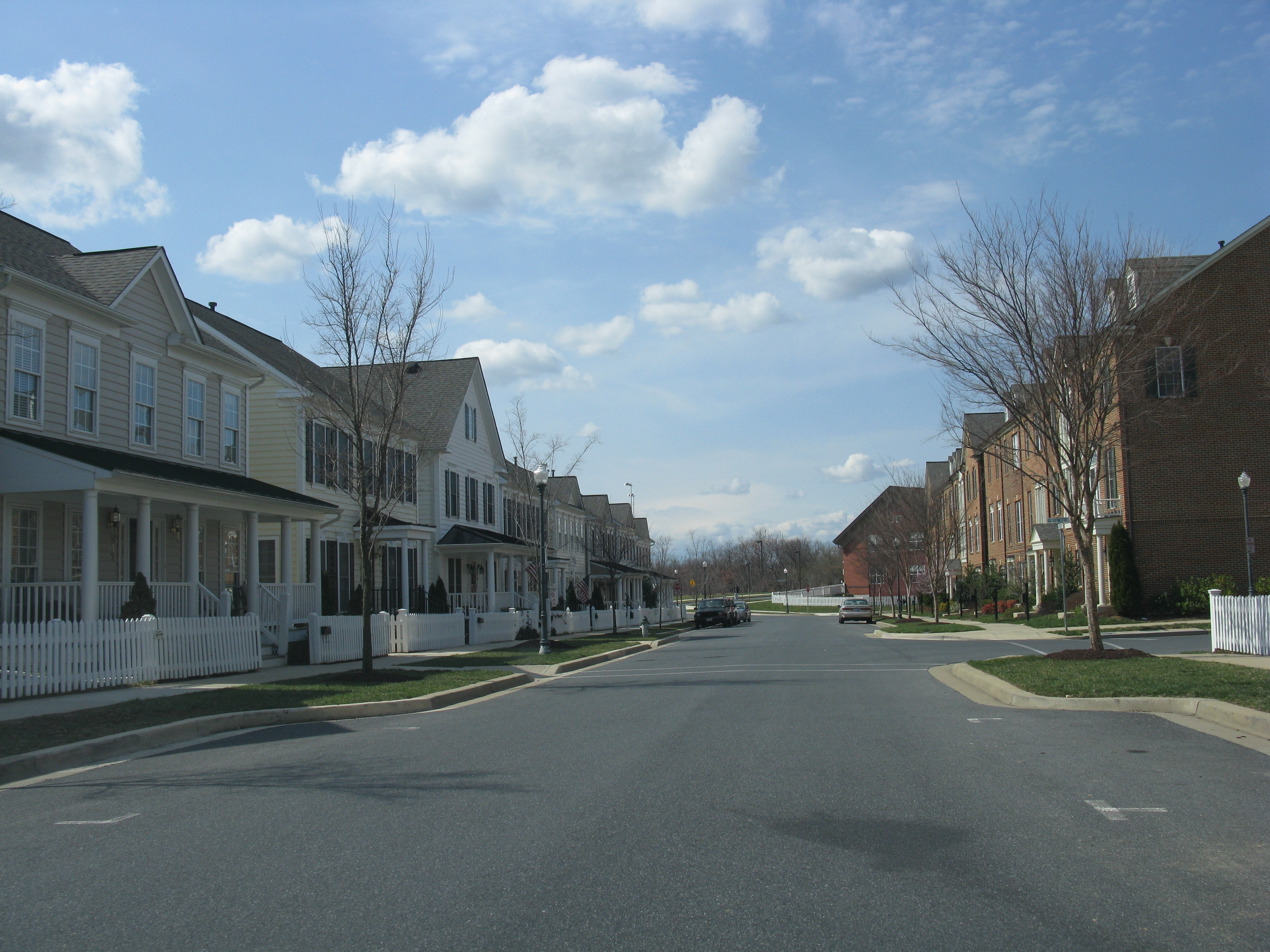
- From left to right, clockwise from top to bottom: Residential street in 2006, Kentlands' main street in March 2008, town houses in March 2008, and Kentlands houses in March 2008.

- Flag
- Interactive map of Kentlands, Maryland
- Coordinates: 39°07′07″N 77°14′09″W
- Country: United States
- State: Maryland
- County: Montgomery
- City: Gaithersburg
- Settled: 1723
- Founded: 1988
- Named for: Otis Beall Kent

Government
  - Type: Board of trustees
  - President: David Hofmann
  - Chair: Charlie Shull
  - Vice-Chair: Jean Foschetti
  - Treasurer: David Gottfried
  - Secretary: Haslyn Hunte
- Website: https://www.kentlands.com/home/

Kentlands is a neighborhood of the U.S. city of Gaithersburg, Maryland.

Kentlands was one of the first attempts to develop a community using Traditional Neighborhood Design planning techniques (also known as 'neo-traditional new town planning') that are now generally referred to under the rubric of the New Urbanism. (The New Urbanism is the concept of building a walkable, mixed-use city neighborhood or new town to provide an attractive alternative to the spread out, automobile-centric, subdivisions common to post-World War II American suburbia.) Kentlands is built around a farmstead previously owned by Otis Beall Kent.

The development, begun in 1988, contains buildings from the original Kentlands farm, many varieties of residences, a "downtown" commercial district, open space including protected natural areas and pocket parks, and civic uses including schools, a church, clubhouse, pool, tennis and basketball courts, catering facility, and an arts center.

== Overview ==
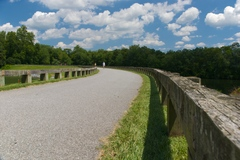
Causeway on Inspiration Lake, Kentlands in 2007.

The town has a system of artificial lakes that snakes through the community. There are jogging trails that run through the parks and districts of the neighborhood. The community's commercial areas and the facilities operated by the Assembly, which include swimming pools, tennis courts, playgrounds, performance spaces, and a large clubhouse, are all within walking distance of one another.

Kentlands is divided into several districts, including "Old Farm", built around the historic mansion and the Kentlands Village Square; "Gatehouse", named after the farm's entry gatehouse, which has been reconstructed; the "Hill Districts"; the "Lakes Districts"; "Kentlands Bluff"; "Midtown/Main Street"; "Market Square"; and "Kentlands Square". The winding street layout is based on a grid pattern, varied as necessary by the requirements of Kentlands topography. Multiple open green spaces and pocket parks have been developed where land was available between the districts or in odd spaces near buildings and dwellings.

Market Square, Kentlands Square, and the Boulevard Shops are commercial districts with grocery stores, banks, boutiques, offices, stores, dozens of restaurants, and a 10-screen cinema cafe. Main Street is a mixed-use area with distinctive "live-work" buildings with retail and office uses on the lower floors and residential uses on the upper floors. City planners, public officials, business owners, and neighborhood residents worked with urban designers from HOK, a global architecture firm, at the “Kentlands Commercial District Charrette”in which a plan was developed for an intensified mixed-use and transit-oriented “Downtown Kentlands”. The proposals developed in the charrette are now winding their way through the City of Gaithersburg's master planning process.

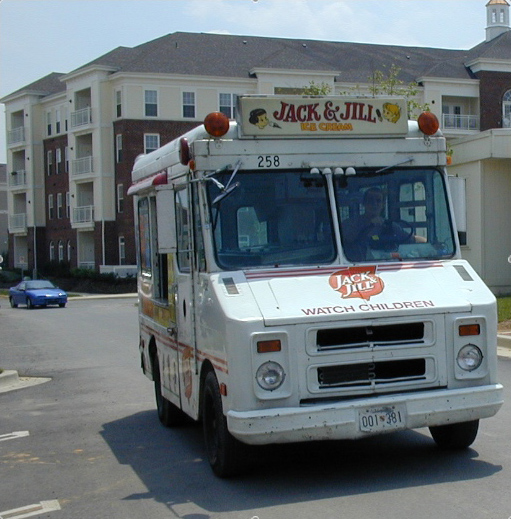
An ice cream truck driving through Kentlands in 2005.

Kentlands, along with its sister community Lakelands, is among the largest of the New Urbanist projects. More than 8,000 residents now live in Kentlands and Lakelands, with office and commercial development totaling more than 1,000,000 sq ft (93,000 m^{2}).

Rachel Carson Elementary School is at one entrance to the community and Lakelands Park Middle School divides the newer development of Lakelands from the former National Geographic complex that is adjacent to it, now occupied by Montgomery County Public Safety Headquarters and the Montgomery County Alcoholic Beverage Services.

Throughout the year, community events take place in and around the Kentlands organized by community members. These include the Kentlands/Lakelands 5K race, Oktoberfest, the Fourth of July Parade, film festivals, and acoustic jams.

== History ==
Kentlands is built on a former farm estate that had its origins in a 1723 land grant to Joseph West. In the mid-18th century, Henry Clagett, a prosperous farmer, acquired much of this land for his holdings. When Clagett died in 1777, several sections of this property passed to his son, Joseph.

The Tschiffely family began to farm the land in 1852, when Frederick A. Tschiffely, who owned a prominent wholesale pharmaceutical business in Washington, D.C., purchased more than 200 acres (0.81 km^{2}) of land from the Clagett heirs. In 1900, his son, also named Frederick A. Tschiffely, built the impressive brick mansion, barn, gatehouse, overseer's house, greenhouse and chicken coop that gave the property the nickname of "The Bricks". The family called their estate Wheatlands, after the wheat that was grown on the farm, and raised their eight children in the mansion. Mr. Tschiffely was the largest wholesale pharmaceutical distributor in the Washington area and owner of Washington's best-known pharmacy. His daily commute to Washington began with a horse and buggy drive to the Gaithersburg train station.

In 1942, the Tschiffely family sold the land to Otis Beall Kent. Kent, a wealthy tax lawyer, renamed the land “Kentlands Farm”, and he set about to create a gentleman's estate and wildlife sanctuary. In the 1960s, part of the land was given to the Izaak Walton League and the National Geographic Society with conditions of maintaining much of the land as a wildlife sanctuary. Mr. Kent bequeathed the remainder of the property to his adopted daughter, Helene Danger Kent. That portion was annexed into the city of Gaithersburg and was sold in 1988 to the town creator, Joe Alfandre.

Alfandre, a developer, brought in Andres Duany and Elizabeth Plater-Zyberk (partners in what was then called DPZ), urban planners credited with designing the town of Seaside, Florida. After the June 1988 Kentlands charrette, several historic buildings were donated to the city. The neighborhood was built in a process that involved several additional charrettes. As the project was nearing completion, a sister development, named Lakelands, was built adjacent to Kentlands. Lakelands also was designed in a charrette process including the DPZ team, the city staff, and local residents.

Construction started in 1989, and the first model homes opened in mid-1990. The first Kentlands residents moved into new homes in 1991.

A number of historic landmarks from the original Kent Farm were refurbished and donated to the city. The Kentlands Mansion, the main residence of the farm owners and the center of historic Kentlands Farm, is now a city-owned venue for art exhibits, concerts, and public events, and is available as a rental for private parties and meetings. The Kentlands Barn has been converted into a public arts center with studios, exhibit space, and a 99-seat theater used for theatrical performances and concerts. The former farm manager's house has been transformed into a private residence, another farm building into the town architect's office, and another building was sold to the Kentlands Citizens Assemble—Kentlands' administrative body—which converted it into a meeting place, exhibit hall, and the headquarters of the Kentlands Community Foundation. The old Kentlands Firehouse, garden buildings, a "peacock house”, and other historic artifacts have not yet been restored, while some ruins have become part of privately owned property or city parks.

Near the end of the 2010s, the Market Square began to undergo major redevelopment. In early 2018, the center's movie theater, Paragon Theaters Kentlands, closed in favor of a new, premium theater that is part of the Mexican Cinepolis luxury theater chain, which opened the following year.
