= Paul James (actor) =

American actor

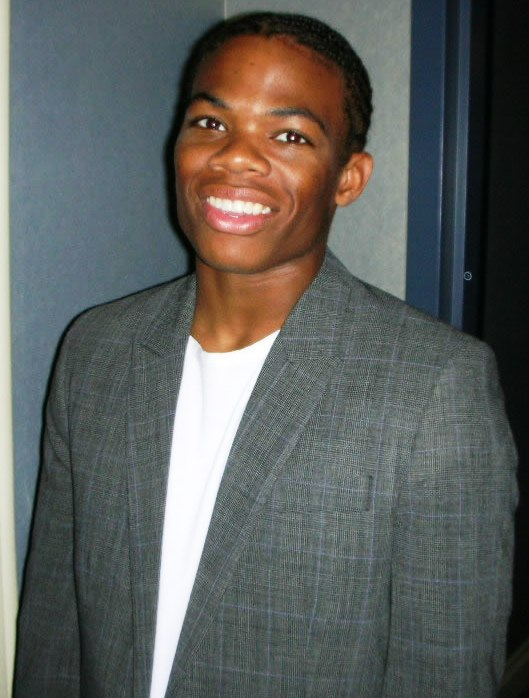
- James in 2006
- Born: Washington, D.C., U.S.
- Occupation: Actor
- Years active: 2004–present

Paul James is an American actor, best known for his role of Calvin on the ABC Family television show Greek. James also starred in the movie The Architect. He graduated from Syracuse University with a BA degree in Theatre. James also starred as Sean Egan on the Hulu TV series The Path.

== Early life and education ==
James was born in Washington, D.C., and raised in the neighboring suburbs of Maryland. He graduated from Quince Orchard High School in Gaithersburg, Maryland. His mother was a school teacher at Watkins Mill High School in Gaithersburg, Maryland up until 2007.

== Career ==
James starred on ABC Family's Greek, which aired for four seasons. In the show James plays Calvin Owens, a gay member of Omega Chi Delta fraternity. Fans have applauded both the show for portraying homosexuality in a good light and Paul James as an actor for his portrayal of a black gay man living in a fraternity house.

== Filmography ==
Year	Title	Role	Notes
2004	The Deerings	C.J.	Television film
2005	Cold Case	Zeke Williams	Episode: "Strange Fruit"
2005	Cry Wolf	Lewis	
2006	Twenty Questions	George Perkins	Television film
2006	The Architect	Shawn	
2007	Without a Trace	Allen Hayes	Episode: "Absalom"
2007–2011	Greek	Calvin Owens	Main cast
2008	Spinning into Butter	Simon Brick	
2008	CSI: Miami	Duncan	Episode: "Ambush"
2010	NCIS: Los Angeles	James 'Junior' Dobbs	Episode: "Blood Brothers"
2010	Bones	Hunter Lang	Episode: "The Shallow in the Deep"
2011	Lie to Me	Kyle	Episode: Killer App
2011	Torchwood	Noah Vickers	5 episodes
2011	Dragon Crusaders	Bryce	
2013	Crawlspace	Derek	
2013	CSI: NY	P.O. Trey Jensen	Episode: "Today Is Life"
2014	Shameless	T.A.	Episode: "Simple Pleasures"
2014	Farmed and Dangerous	Max	2 episodes
2014	Grey's Anatomy	Eric	Episode: "We Gotta Get Out Of This Place"
2014	CSI: Crime Scene Investigation	Bomb Squad Tech	Episode: "The CSI Effect"
2014–2017	The Last Ship	O'Connor	22 episodes
2015	Desecrated	Marcus	
2016–2017	The Path	Sean Egan	Recurring (season 1); main cast (season 2)
2018	Unlovable	Ben	
2018	Apostle	Townsmen Guard	
2019	The Hot Zone	Ben Gellis	6 episodes
2019	Soundtrack	Sam	Main cast
2021	Gossip Girl	Aaron	Episode: "Lies Wide Shut"
2021	Nash Bridges	Keith 'Philly' Morton	Television film
2022	I Love That for You	Jordan Wahl	Main cast
2023	Lessons in Chemistry	Charlie Sloan	Recurring

== Awards ==
Year	Award	Category	Nominated work	Result	Ref.
2009	NAACP Image Awards	Outstanding Actor in a Comedy Series	Greek	Nominated	
