= A Day in the Death =

2008 Torchwood episode

21 – "A Day in the Death"
- Torchwood episode
- Owen holds on to "the Pulse", expecting it to explode.

Cast
- Starring: John Barrowman – Captain Jack Harkness; Eve Myles – Gwen Cooper; Burn Gorman – Owen Harper; Naoko Mori – Toshiko Sato; Gareth David-Lloyd – Ianto Jones; Freema Agyeman – Martha Jones
- Others: Richard Briers – Parker; Christine Bottomley – Maggie; Louis Decosta Johnson – Farrington; Brett Allen – Taylor; Gil Kolirin – Webb

Production
- Directed by: Andy Goddard
- Written by: Joseph Lidster
- Script editor: Gary Russell
- Produced by: Richard Stokes; Chris Chibnall (co-producer)
- Executive producer(s): Russell T Davies; Julie Gardner
- Music by: Ben Foster
- Production code: 2.8
- Series: Series 2
- Running time: 50 mins
- First broadcast: 5 March 2008

Chronology
← Preceded by "Dead Man Walking"	Followed by → "Something Borrowed"

"A Day in the Death" is the eighth episode of the second series of the British science fiction television series Torchwood, which was broadcast on BBC Two on 5 March 2008 with an initial airing on BBC Three on 27 February.

The episode follows the dismissal and later readmission of the recently undead medical officer Owen Harper (Burn Gorman) to the alien-hunting team Torchwood.

== Plot ==
Jack relieves Owen of his duties at Torchwood so Owen's state after being killed and resurrected three days ago (Note: As depicted in the 2008 episodes "Reset" and "Dead Man Walking".) can be examined. Martha assumes his position as Torchwood's medical officer, and Owen is given Ianto's job of making coffee. Martha concludes that Owen is 100% human yet will not age. The team discuss a series of energy spikes coming from the estate of Henry Parker, a reclusive collector of alien artefacts. They devise a plan to find out the origin of the energy spikes, excluding Owen from the task.

Owen goes home. Toshiko arrives to keep him company, but Owen becomes angry when she offers to help. After insulting Toshiko, Owen intentionally breaks his finger (which cannot heal) to show her how "broken" he is, before attempting suicide. He fails to drown since he has no need for breath. At the Hub, the team realise that heat sensors on the Parker estate make it impossible for them to enter. When Owen points out that he has no body heat, Jack agrees to take him on the mission.

After successfully entering the house, Owen reaches Parker, an old man linked up to many ventilators and medical machines after having three heart attacks. Parker says he is being kept alive by a glowing object he calls the Pulse. Owen explains that it isn't keeping him alive; hope is doing the job. Owen promises to help Parker face his fear of death, but Parker suffers another heart attack. Unable to draw breath himself, Owen cannot perform CPR, and Parker dies. The energy from the Pulse is not as dangerous as originally thought; it was an alien species sending a reply to messages NASA sent into space in the 1970s, which appears as a beautiful light.

After Torchwood says farewell to Martha, Owen promises to tell Toshiko whenever he's feeling bad. Owen walks on a footpath, looks up and spots a woman called Maggie Hopley, who is ready to jump off a roof on the anniversary of her husband's death. Asking Maggie if she is ready to jump and revealing his undead state, Owen tells the story of his day to her as a frame story throughout the episode. He later takes the Pulse out of his backpack and shows it to Maggie as a way of showing her it does improve.

=== Continuity ===
- One of Henry Parker's purchases was a Dogon Eye, an item last seen in "Random Shoes". The official website states that he has recently purchased a Cyberman arm and chest unit.
- In the opening scene, archive footage of Louise Delamere as Diane Holmes, Owen's first series love interest, is shown. Also in the opening montage, clips from episodes such as "Everything Changes", "Ghost Machine", "Out of Time" and "Meat" can be glimpsed.
- This is the second episode in which Owen is relieved of his duties. He was previously dismissed by Jack after he opened the rift in "End of Days".

== Production ==
=== Cast notes ===
Richard Briers previously played the Chief Caretaker and the voice of Kroagnon in the 1987 Seventh Doctor serial Paradise Towers.
