= Fragments (Torchwood) =

2008 Torchwood episode

25 – "Fragments"
- Torchwood episode
- Tosh, Jack, Rhys, Gwen, Ianto and Owen watch the holographic message depicting Gray and Captain John.

Cast
- Starring: John Barrowman – Captain Jack Harkness; Eve Myles – Gwen Cooper; Burn Gorman – Owen Harper; Naoko Mori – Toshiko Sato; Gareth David-Lloyd – Ianto Jones
- Others: Kai Owen – Rhys Williams; Amy Manson – Alice Guppy; Heather Craney – Emily Holroyd; Paul Kasey – Blowfish/Weevil; Skye Bennett – Little Girl; Julian Lewis Jones – Alex; Simon Shackleton – Bob; Gareth Jones – Security Guard; Clare Clifford – Milton; Noriko Aida – Toshiko's Mother; Andrea Lowe – Katie; Richard Lloyd-King – Doctor; Catherine Morris – Nurse; Selva Rasalingham – Psychiatrist; James Marsters (uncredited) – Captain John Hart; Lachlan Nieboer (uncredited) – Gray

Production
- Directed by: Jonathan Fox Bassett
- Written by: Chris Chibnall
- Script editor: Gary Russell
- Produced by: Richard Stokes (producer); Chris Chibnall (co-producer)
- Executive producers: Russell T Davies; Julie Gardner
- Music by: Ben Foster
- Production code: 2.12
- Series: Series 2
- Running time: 50 mins
- First broadcast: 28 March 2008

Chronology
← Preceded by "Adrift"	Followed by → "Exit Wounds"

"Fragments" is the twelfth episode of the second series of the British science fiction television series Torchwood, which was broadcast on BBC Two on 28 March 2008 with an initial airing on BBC Three on 21 March.

The episode follows four members of the alien-hunting team Torchwood having flashbacks to how they were recruited after getting trapped under debris.

== Plot ==
Searching an abandoned building for alien life, Torchwood Cardiff (apart from Gwen, who is running late) are blown up by bombs and trapped under debris. Gwen and Rhys arrive to dig everyone out and escape. Jack, Toshiko, Ianto, and Owen flash back to how Torchwood recruited them.

Over 100 years ago, Jack is waiting in Cardiff to find the Doctor, who refuels at the Cardiff Rift. (Note: As depicted in the 2005 Doctor Who episode "Boom Town" and the 2007 Doctor Who episode "Utopia".) Torchwood Cardiff assign Jack a job to find an alien. They blackmail him into cooperating when they notice him mentioning the Doctor, whom Torchwood treat as a threat. (Note: As depicted in the 2006 Doctor Who episode "Tooth and Claw".) Jack refuses his next assignment when an agent, believing the alien to be a threat, shoots it. At a bar, a tarot card reader tells Jack he will meet the Doctor in 100 years. (Note: As depicted in the 2007 Doctor Who episode "Utopia".) Needing something to do until then, Jack returns to Torchwood as an employee. Later, in 1999, Torchwood Cardiff's leader Alex murders his team and himself as a "mercy killing" after Alex sees a vision of the future. Jack becomes the new leader of Torchwood Cardiff.

Five years ago, Toshiko steals plans for a sonic modulator from the government and builds one. She gives it to one of her mother's kidnappers to trade for her release. UNIT soldiers break in and arrest the group, including Toshiko. Toshiko is locked in a cell indefinitely with no rights. Jack arrives and recruits Toshiko to release her, and also in recognition of her talents, as she created a sonic modulator from faulty plans.

21 months ago, Ianto, a former employee of Torchwood London, (Note: As depicted in the 2006 episode "Cyberwoman".) is repeatedly denied a job by Jack as Jack severed links with the old regime after its destruction. (Note: As depicted in the 2007 Doctor Who episode "The Sound of Drums".) Later on, Jack tells Ianto to come to work after the two successfully catch a pterodactyl.

Four years ago, Owen and his fiancée Katie are planning a wedding. After Katie receives scans relating to memory loss, she is admitted to an operation on a brain tumour, which Jack tries to prevent. An alien parasite has buried itself in Katie's brain and emits a toxic gas which kills Katie and the operating surgeons. Seeing Owen's love of saving lives, and giving him a purpose, Jack recruits Owen as a medic.

In the present, Jack receives a message from Captain John Hart, who reveals that he had placed the bombs and shows Jack an image of his brother Gray. John then vows to tear Jack's world apart.

== Continuity ==
- The Little Girl reappears in this episode. She was last seen in the episode "Dead Man Walking". She tells Jack that the Doctor is coming, but "the century will turn twice" before that time. Jack's reunion with the Doctor occurs at the end of "End of Days" & the start of "Utopia".
- Toshiko's mother, as played by Noriko Aida, reappears in this episode, having last been seen in "End of Days".
- Toshiko's "sonic modulator" device based on stolen design plans bears superficial similarities to the Doctor's sonic screwdriver, and its ear-splitting effect is similar to that produced by holding together two similar sonic devices in Doctor Who's 2008 episode "Partners in Crime", airing just over two weeks later.
- This is the first time the Doctor has been explicitly named in the series.
- A blowfish alien, similar to the one seen in "Kiss Kiss, Bang Bang", appears in flashback sequences involving Jack's first mission for the Torchwood Institute.
- Captain Jack radios orders to an offscreen Suzie Costello in Ianto's flashback, although Ianto's arrival in the scene prevents the character from being given any lines. She kills herself soon thereafter in "Everything Changes". Suzie was last mentioned in the episode "Dead Man Walking", and last seen upon her resurrection in the Series One episode "They Keep Killing Suzie".
- In his flashback, Ianto Jones refers to his girlfriend, Lisa Hallett, as having died during the Battle of Canary Wharf. Lisa is seen again as a partly converted Cyberman in the Series One episode "Cyberwoman".
- The Roald Dahl Plass, situated directly above the hub, was an active coal-shipping dock until after World War II. The Torchwood 3 hub is in the same location.
- Alice and Emily tell Jack that the Torchwood Institute was founded to protect the Empire from the Doctor and other phantasmagoria, and they kill aliens whom they deem "a threat to the Empire". They are following Queen Victoria's charter of the institute, as depicted in "Tooth and Claw".
- Jack tells Alice and Emily that the Doctor uses the Cardiff space-time rift to refuel the TARDIS, which he learned in "Boom Town".
- The Torchwood emblem (a letter T within a hexagon) on the stationery Alice uses is the same in 1918, as shown in "To the Last Man".
- Immediately before killing himself, Alex tells Jack, "The 21st century, Jack; everything's going to change, and we're not ready." This parallels Jack's voiceover at the start of each episode of Series One and Two: "The 21st century is when everything changes, and [you've got to be / Torchwood is] ready."
- An on-screen caption places the episode 21 months after Ianto convinces Jack to hire him in the aftermath of "Doomsday".

== Production ==
=== Cast notes ===
Clare Clifford had played Kyle in the Fifth Doctor story Earthshock.

== Critical reception ==
Ben Rawson-Jones of Digital Spy reacted highly positively saying 'this episode demonstrates the power of the ensemble cast', praising the narrative structure and acknowledging the 'gripping twist ending.' The fansite Androzani.com, who react mostly negatively to Torchwood, say 'It's not entirely stellar. But when it does work, it works very nicely indeed.' This episode is also a favourite among the fan base.
