= To the Last Man (Torchwood) =

2008 Torchwood episode

16 – "To the Last Man"
- Torchwood episode
- Toshiko convinces her lover, a stranded soldier suffering from shellshock, to return to World War I where he will eventually be executed for cowardice. Critics praised both the characterisation and the anti-war sentiment in the episode.

Cast
- Starring: John Barrowman – Captain Jack Harkness; Eve Myles – Gwen Cooper; Burn Gorman – Owen Harper; Naoko Mori – Toshiko Sato; Gareth David-Lloyd – Ianto Jones
- Others: Anthony Lewis – Tommy Brockless; Roderic Culver – Gerald Carter; Siobhan Hewlett – Harriet Derbyshire; Lizzie Rogan – Nurse; Ricky Fearon – Foreman

Production
- Directed by: Andy Goddard
- Written by: Helen Raynor
- Script editor: Brian Minchin
- Produced by: Richard Stokes; Chris Chibnall (co-producer)
- Executive producers: Russell T Davies; Julie Gardner
- Music by: Ben Foster
- Production code: 2.3
- Series: Series 2
- Running time: 50 mins
- First broadcast: 30 January 2008

Chronology
← Preceded by "Sleeper"	Followed by → "Meat"

"To the Last Man" is the third episode of the second series of the British science fiction television series Torchwood, which was first broadcast on BBC Two on 30 January 2008. The episode was written by returning series guest writer, Helen Raynor, directed by Andy Goddard and produced by Richard Stokes. As with all episodes of Torchwood's first two series, "To the Last Man" featured series regulars John Barrowman, Eve Myles, Burn Gorman, Naoko Mori and Gareth David Lloyd, with Mori's character Toshiko Sato given the main focus.

The narrative centres on the intersection of Toshiko's romance with Tommy Brockless (Anthony Lewis), a cryogenically frozen soldier from World War I, and a number of hazardous time slips from 1918. As the impending crisis becomes more severe, Toshiko must choose between the man she has fallen in love with and the world at stake. Tommy eventually elects to return to 1918, where Toshiko knows he will be executed because of his shellshock.

"To the Last Man" was filmed as part of the first production block of Torchwood's second series. Helen Raynor was inspired to write the episode to explore the issue of soldiers executed for cowardice during the First World War. The episode was watched by an aggregated total of 4.97 million viewers across its first three showings. The episode received mixed reviews, with the characterisation, romance, atmosphere and anti-war sentiment proving the most popular elements. Both the storylining of the episode and the reliance on plot devices were heavily criticised.

== Plot ==
Tommy Brockless is a young World War I soldier, shell-shocked from his experiences in the trenches. In 1918, Torchwood agents Gerald Carter and Harriet Derbyshire take Tommy from St Teilo's Military Hospital in Cardiff to be kept in cryogenic storage. They leave instructions for future Torchwood members that Tommy will one day be key to saving the world. In the present day it is revealed that Torchwood have kept Tommy in storage for 90 years, releasing him one day a year for a medical check-up.

Whilst Tommy is under day-release, Toshiko elects to keep him company. Whilst Toshiko spends time with Tommy, Jack and Gwen discover that the abandoned Cardiff hospital is showing signs of time distortion, with elements of the 1918 hospital appearing in the present. Meanwhile, Toshiko and Tommy grow closer; after an afternoon in the pub, he kisses her romantically. Upon their return, Jack realises that the present year is when Tommy will be needed: he will have to travel back to 1918 and activate "basically a key" called a Rift Manipulator to close the connection between 1918 and the present and prevent disaster. As Tommy is due to be executed for cowardice three weeks after his return to 1918, Toshiko initially refuses to let him go back. Jack persuades her of the necessity of Tommy's return.

After spending the night together, Toshiko and Tommy return to the hospital as the disruptions intensify, accompanied by Jack. During one disruption, the three witness the 1918 Torchwood team; Jack relays instructions through Tommy for them to take the 1918 version of Tommy into their custody before the older Tommy arrives. Tommy and Toshiko share a goodbye, and Jack briefs Tommy on using the key before he steps back to 1918 during the next disruption. However, when back in the past, Tommy becomes shell-shocked, and is led back to his bed by nurses; he is unable to operate the key in his state. At Torchwood's Hub, Jack and Toshiko use the Cardiff Rift to project an image of Toshiko into Tommy's mind. Tommy senses some familiarity with Toshiko but otherwise does not recognise her. Despite this, Toshiko is able to instruct Tommy to activate the key, and the distortions at the hospital soon dissipate.

== Production ==
=== Writing ===
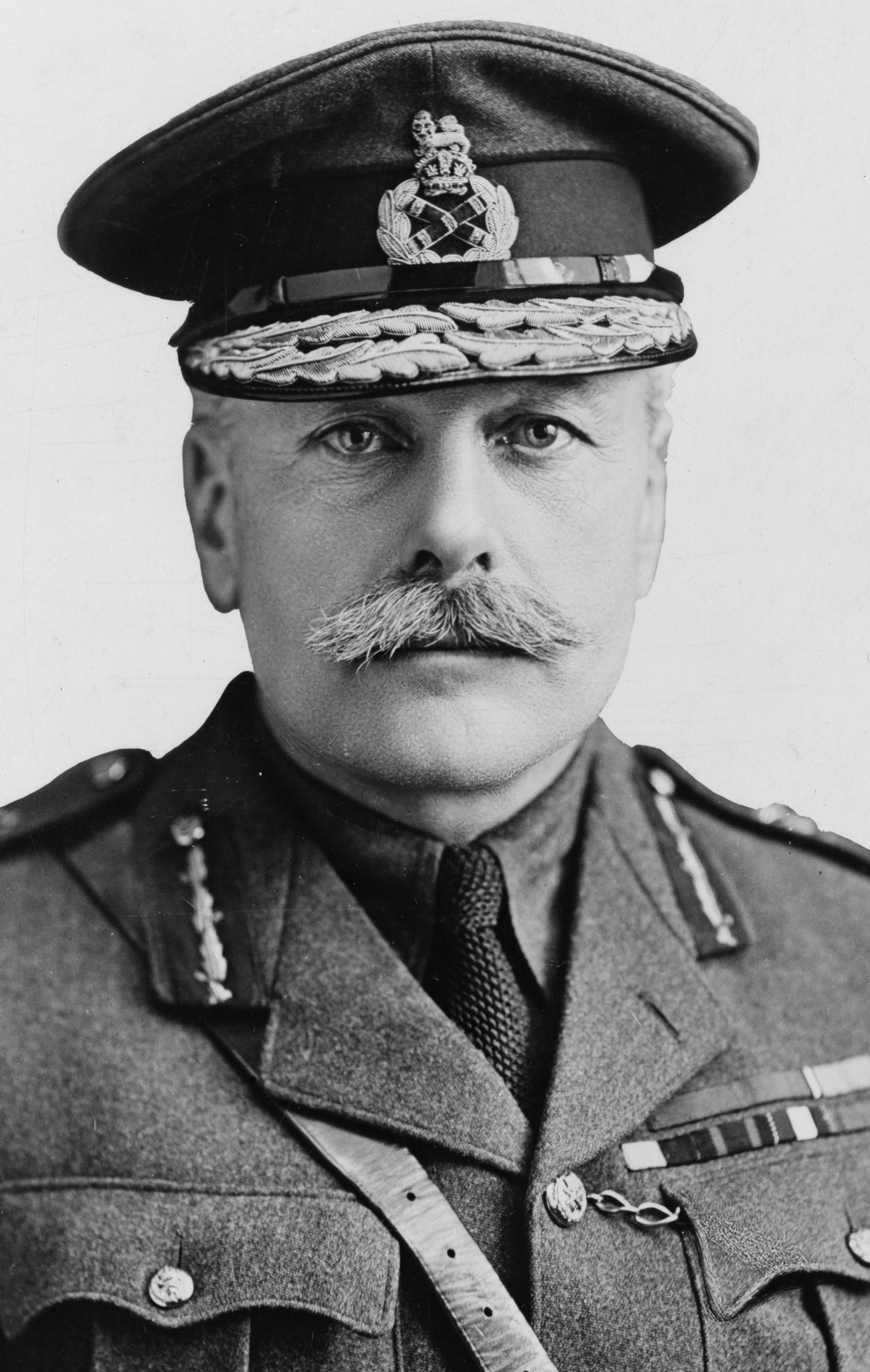
The episode's title recalled an order given by Douglas Haig during the First World War.

Helen Raynor, the writer of the episode, expressed an interest in writing a Toshiko-centric episode at the first script meeting for the second series of Torchwood. She wanted to write a story centred on Toshiko because she "absolutely [loves] Tosh as a character" and wanted "to take her on another step". Inspiration for the story came from a short fictional document written by James Goss for the in-universe Torchwood Institute website created by BBC Online for the first series. The document detailed a man whom Torchwood would defrost "once a year, give him a day out, and then pop him back in the freezer". Series creator Russell T Davies described the episode as a "love story" but felt it inevitable that the story would end in tears. In creating the character of Tommy Brockless, Raynor felt that he was "the perfect boyfriend" for Toshiko. However, she stated that their brief relationship was not a "mature relationship" but "a pretend relationship" as Toshiko only "gets him out of the box once a year". She added that what Tosh has to learn is that Tommy cannot be "treated like a toy". In regards to the conclusion of the episode, she stated that "it's a hugely painful goodbye for both of them".

Raynor was also inspired by the issue of World War I soldiers who were executed for cowardice when they were suffering from shellshock. One of the episode's working titles was "Soldier's Heart", an American Civil War term for shellshock. The final title recalls an infamous order from Field Marshal Douglas Haig on 11 April 1918, in response to the German spring offensive, which included the phrase: "Every position must be held to the last man: there must be no retirement". This policy led shell-shocked soldiers, like the fictional Tommy, to be sent back to war after a very short recuperation period. Director Andy Goddard felt that a scene in which Tommy watches footage of the Iraq War was key to the episode; this experience tells Tommy that the human condition has not changed since 1918 and that humanity still makes the same mistakes. During the episode, Jack suggests that the British army executed "more than 300" shell-shocked soldiers for cowardice during the First World War. Executions for all offences numbered 346, of which 40 were for murder or mutiny. The remaining 306 were for desertion (266), cowardice (18), and other offences (22). While some of these can now be attributed to shell shock, most cannot, although all 306 were posthumously pardoned in 2006. Early drafts of the episode included Tommy asking for Suzie Costello, a member of the Torchwood Institute who had committed suicide in the series' 2006 premiere episode. In regards to the sensitive material in the episode, actress Naoko Mori stated that whilst reading the script she "kind of forgot it was Torchwood and [that] it was science-fiction". She found the climax of the episode "heartbreaking".

=== Filming and effects ===
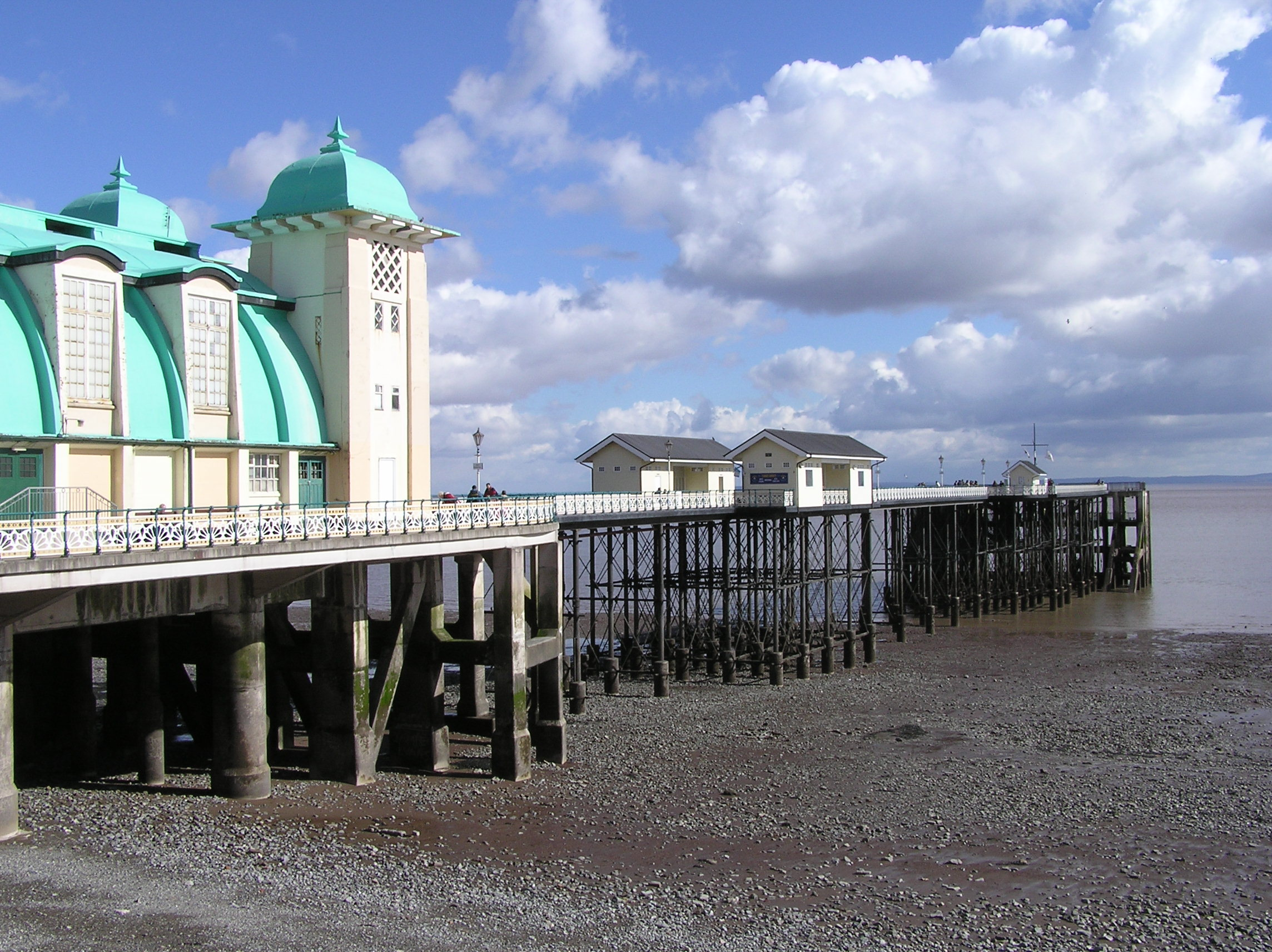
The first significant location shoot of the second series was at Penarth Pier.

"To The Last Man" was filmed alongside "Adam" as part of Block 1 of production. It was originally intended to be the fourth episode transmitted. The scenes featuring Toshiko and Tommy on the Penarth Pier were recorded, in between heavy rainfall, on 9 May 2007 and marked the first significant location shoot for the second series. Scenes set in Toshiko's flat were also filmed this day at a house in Palace Road, Cardiff. The episode's final scene, showing Toshiko and Owen looking out over Cardiff Bay was recorded 10 May. Cardiff Royal Infirmary provided the interior locations for scenes set in the fictional St Teilo's military hospital which were filmed between 12 and 18 May. The pub where Toshiko and Tommy play pool was the Eli Jenkins on Bute Street, Cardiff. The Red Cross emblem is used throughout the episode; the closing credits include the attribution: "Thanks to the British Red Cross for permission to use the Red Cross emblem."

An important sequence within the episode was the time-shift which ends in Tommy returning to 1918. Goddard noted that the time-shift "essentially happened off-screen" and that what the audience sees is "great big wind machines and camera lights". Anthony Lewis described the wind machine used as "the biggest wind machine I've ever seen in my life". He comments that the intensity of the wind machine and the lighting enabled an "instant-made reaction" from himself and Mori. Goddard added that his first assistant director was "instrumental in gearing up all the extras into a frenzy". The episode's soundtrack included the song "One of These Mornings" by Moby, which featured the vocals of Patti LaBelle, from his 2002 album, 18. The track heard in the pub scene is "She's Got You High" from Mumm-Ra's 2007 debut album These Things Move in Threes.

== Broadcast and reception ==
"To the Last Man" was first broadcast on BBC Two on 30 January 2008 at 9:00 pm. The episode was later repeated on the digital channel BBC Three on 30 January at 11:00 pm, with an edited pre-watershed repeat airing the next day, 31 January 2008, at 7:00 pm. Stephen James Walker, a writer who publishes on the subject of Doctor Who and its spin-offs, noted that the pre-watershed edition of "To the Last Man" had fewer cuts than any other. According to consolidated figures the episode was viewed by 3.51 million viewers on BBC Two, 0.31 million viewers for its first BBC Three repeat and 1.15 million viewers for the pre-watershed repeat, amounting to an aggregated 4.97 million viewers across its three initial showings.

=== Critical reception ===
Ben Rawson-Jones of Digital Spy gave the episode a four star review, stating that it provided "another example of a resoundingly triumphant ending that conveys so much via [a] simple image". He praised the characterisation of Toshiko—stating that both Mori and Raynor "deserve a great deal of credit for reaching such dramatic heights"—and also the "refreshingly non-mawkish glimpse at the brutality of war and humanity". Ian Berriman of SFX was more mixed, giving the episode three stars and comparing it to a re-written version of the series one episode "Captain Jack Harkness". He felt that though the episode provided a "likeably girlish side of Torchwood’s blandest character" the characterisation did not add enough depth. Berriman acknowledged the "sweet, surprisingly subdued, almost coy" tone as an indicator of the programme's flexibility, but added that he "[prefers] the show when it’s full-blooded and outrageous." Charlie Jane Anders of io9 gave a critical review, feeling that Toshiko and Tommy had "no chemistry" and that the episode seemed to convey that "men die for women's wiles". She felt that despite the flaws of the romance plot, the episode provided some "powerful stuff" and that Tommy's plight was a strong concept if poorly resolved.

Travis Fickett of IGN gave the episode 7.9 out of ten, enjoying the time overlaps, the relationship between Toshiko and Tommy and the appearance of previous Torchwood employees. However, he felt that some of the episode's plot elements strained the "credibility of the mythology". Joan O'Connell Herdman of Slant Magazine enjoyed the characterisation and British historical perspective the episode afforded, though stated that "characters make this episode, plot devices nearly destroy it." She felt the main strength of the episode was the use of a science fiction crisis "to frame a story about love and sacrifice, the horrors of war and the burdens of command". Alan Stanley Blair of Airlock Alpha felt that the episode succeeded in the atmosphere it created, opining that "1918 is a fantastic setting for a ghost story" and that like "Kiss Kiss Bang Bang" and "Sleeper", the episode showed that "all the [wrinkles] from the first season have been completely ironed out".

Den of Geek's Andrew Mickel also enjoyed the episode, contrary to his expectations, having not been impressed by either Torchwood's earlier stories nor Helen Raynor's Doctor Who scripts. He appreciated that the episode centred on Toshiko, rather than Gwen whom he felt to be "a personal figure of hate", and felt that Tommy was "endearing in a burkish kind of way". Mickel felt that Raynor "pulled off the characterisation that was so sorely missing from ["Sleeper"]" whilst also treating Tommy's wartime origin with subtlety. Jason Hughes of AOL TV singled out the juxtaposition of Toshiko and Tommy's romance and the military hospital ghost hauntings for praise. He compared the episode to a "monster-of-the-week" episode of The X-Files in that it "doesn't do much to push the overall mythology of the series forward but still manages to capture what day-to-day life in Torchwood would be like".
