= Meat (Torchwood) =

2008 Torchwood episode

17 – "Meat"
- Torchwood episode
- The ever growing alien provides a seemingly unlimited supply of meat.

Cast
- Starring: John Barrowman – Captain Jack Harkness; Eve Myles – Gwen Cooper; Burn Gorman – Owen Harper; Naoko Mori – Toshiko Sato; Gareth David-Lloyd – Ianto Jones
- Others: Kai Owen – Rhys Williams; Colin Baxter – Policeman; Patti Clare – Ruth; Garry Lake – Vic; Gerard Carey – Greg; Matt Ryan – Dale

Production
- Directed by: Colin Teague
- Written by: Catherine Tregenna
- Script editor: Brian Minchin
- Produced by: Richard Stokes; Chris Chibnall (co-producer)
- Executive producers: Russell T Davies; Julie Gardner
- Music by: Ben Foster
- Production code: 2.4
- Series: Series 2
- Running time: 50 mins
- First broadcast: 6 February 2008

Chronology
← Preceded by "To the Last Man"	Followed by → "Adam"

"Meat" is the fourth episode of the second series of British science fiction television series Torchwood, which was first broadcast on BBC Two on 6 February 2008. It was written by Catherine Tregenna, who had previously written episodes for the first series of the show, directed by Colin Teague and produced by Richard Stokes. The episode featured the five initial series regulars John Barrowman, Eve Myles, Burn Gorman, Naoko Mori and Gareth David Lloyd plus recurring actor Kai Owen in a central role.

Torchwood initially depicts a small team of alien-hunters known as Torchwood, based in Cardiff. In the premiere episode of the first series Gwen Cooper (Eve Myles) is introduced as a newcomer to the organisation who keeps her job secret from boyfriend Rhys Williams (Kai Owen). The episode "Meat" depicts the two aspects of Gwen's double life coming into conflict as Rhys finds himself caught up in Torchwood's investigation into a corrupt meat trade stemming from human exploitation of a stranded benevolent alien. Rhys helps Torchwood in their attempts to apprehend the human villains of the episode and his bravery makes Gwen realise that she should no longer keep secrets from him.

The episode was filmed in and around Cardiff between June and July 2007 as part of the second production block of the series. The production team used the episode to expand Rhys' role in the series, due to their appreciation of actor Kai Owen's performances in the first series and the contention of executive producer Russell T Davies that the character should be seen as less of a "sap" in the second series. The alien "space whale" seen in the episode was created using computer-generated imagery, with the exception of a cut section wound where the humans had been carving meat from. Tregenna characterised the monster as resembling "a giant kebab". A more elaborate design was previously considered, but both Tregenna and Davies felt that this would detract from the alien's suitability to the plot.

According to consolidated figures the episode was watched by 3.28 million viewers on its BBC Two debut, aggregated to 4.74 million viewers after taking into consideration two repeat broadcasts the same week. Most commentators praised the larger role of Rhys in the episode, the performance of actor Kai Owen and the realism of the acting and dialogue overall. However, a large proportion of reviewers criticised the special effects used to create the alien, with some comparing its realisation to a sock puppet or hand puppet. Whilst some reviewers identified with the plight of the alien, others felt that its poor realisation meant that it was hard to feel any sympathy for it.

== Plot ==
Rhys is out driving when he is telephoned by his secretary Ruth, who informs him that one of their transportation firm's lorry drivers has crashed. At the crash Rhys discovers that Leighton, one of his employees and friends, has died whilst transporting meat to an abattoir. As he contemplates moving the lorry, a police officer tells him that there is something suspicious in the back and that Torchwood want to investigate. Torchwood confiscate the meat that the lorry was transporting, due to suspicions that it originates from an alien, which they later confirm. Rhys spots his fiancée Gwen amongst them. Gwen recognises the lorry as one from Rhys' firm. Rhys and Torchwood both suspect each other's involvement with the alien meat.

Rhys follows Gwen and her boss Jack to the Merthyr abattoir. While there he is captured by a group of men and subsequently taken inside the warehouse. Jack and Gwen see this and mistake his actions for collaboration. When questioned by his captors Rhys offers to assume Leighton's job in trafficking the alien meat. The men subsequently show Rhys that they have captured a live sea creature which is the source of the meat and which continues to grow despite them cutting chunks of its flesh away while it is still alive. Back at their flat, Rhys and Gwen argue over his presence at the warehouse and her presence at the lorry crash. Gwen is forced to confess her secret she has been keeping from Rhys that she catches aliens for a living, and her "special ops" role was a cover story. (Note: Gwen first describes her role to Rhys this way in the 2006 episode "Day One".) To prove it she takes Rhys to the Hub. After recounting his findings and discussing the situation, Rhys agrees to help Torchwood investigate the warehouse.

As Rhys is expected by the alien's captors, Torchwood hide in his van as he drives them to the abattoir where Torchwood sneak in. They locate the creature and plan to sedate it so they can send it back through the Cardiff Rift. Torchwood stun the men and feed them amnesia pills, as no court of law would believe what had happened. The creature becomes distressed and Owen can see no other option but to euthanise it. Back at the Hub, Jack orders Gwen to give Rhys a pill too. After realising that Rhys is willing to support her life with Torchwood and that she enjoys being honest with him, Gwen refuses.

== Production ==
"Meat" was made alongside "Sleeper", the second episode of the series which was also directed by Teague, as part of block two of production which ran from 3 June to 5 July 2007. It originally had the working title "Another Working Day". In discussing the origins of the central alien writer Catherine Tregenna states that "we were just throwing ideas around and true to form Russell [T Davies] said "why isn't it just a great big whale in a warehouse?"" Davies states the alien was designed to be "one of Torchwood and Doctor Who's biggest monsters" not in terms of concept but its "literal size". He felt this provided insight into "the strangeness of life". Producer Richard Stokes states that the concept design team created an idea of what they envisaged the whale to look like. Tregenna felt that the original design for the creature was "a little fanciful" in that it was a bit too "beautiful and exotic" before deciding "if it looked like that they [the villains] would exhibit it, it would be a freak show." She characterises the final design as resembling "a giant kebab". Contrary to observations from commentators, Tregenna did not intend the story to promote vegetarianism as she is not a vegetarian — she simply wanted to write an episode that was more action based than her series one episodes ("Out of Time" and "Captain Jack Harkness"). The hypothetical size of the space whale resulted in Teague having to find this "huge great warehouse" and hire a fifty-foot crane for camera angles. Whilst the main body of the alien was created using computer-generated imagery a prosthetic version of the cut wound in the side of the alien was available for the actors to interact with on set. Actor Eve Myles describes it as being like filming within a "blood soaked, soppy big sponge". The opening of the creature's eye was created using green screen. Owen felt having to react to this to be the most unusual acting experience he'd had whilst filming Torchwood.

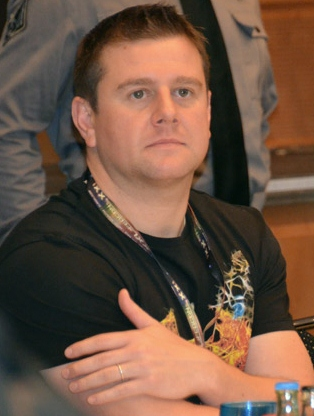
Kai Owen was given a larger role in the second series

In regards to the relationship between Gwen and Rhys, Davies felt that the episode provided a "rite of passage for the couple". Director Colin Teague remarked that the character of Rhys "puts up with a lot from his wife to be." The production team had previously planned to kill the character off at the end of the previous series but retained the character, partly because they liked Owen as an actor. In storylining the second series Davies states that "one of the first decisions we made was that we can't make this guy look like a sap any longer. He's got to be made aware of what's going on." Tregenna identified one of the central themes of the episode as the "love triangle between Gwen, Rhys and Jack". The argument in which Gwen ultimately reveals to Rhys that she catches aliens for a living was partly improvised by Owen and Myles. The denouement of the episode sees the character of Rhys take a bullet to protect Gwen. To create this scene Owen's clothing was fitted with a minor explosive, the gunshot effect "[nipped] a bit" which both Teague and Owen felt helped with the timing of the actor's reaction. Location filming for the episode took place around Roald Dahl Plass on 3 July for several scenes, including the final scene with Gwen and Rhys on Mermaid Quay, and the earlier scene where Rhys observes Jack and Gwen by the water fountain. A warehouse near Roath Dock, Cardiff Bay was used as the location for the abandoned warehouse-meat processing plant, whilst the Imperial Park Bypass was used for some of the road scenes. During the episode Gwen asks "What is this, Scooby-Doo?" in regards to Rhys' suggestion the team hide in his van in order to carry out a sting operation. Torchwood Magazine suggest that this was a knowing reference from Tregenna to the critic and satirist Charlie Brooker's reaction to the first series of the show.

== Broadcast ==
On overnight returns, The Guardian reported that the episode had an 11% audience share and 2.9 million viewers for its first BBC Two broadcast at 9pm on 6 February. According to consolidated figures released by the Broadcasters' Audience Research Board the episode's first broadcast had an estimated total audience of 3.28 million viewers. The episode had an audience appreciation index of 85, regarded as excellent. A late night repeat of the episode aired on BBC sister channel BBC Three the same night at 11pm and a further pre-watershed repeat, edited to be child friendly, of the episode aired the next day, 7 February, at 7pm. Stephen James Walker, a writer of reference works on Doctor Who and its spin-offs, noted that "Meat" "was one of the more heavily edited episodes of the series for its pre-watershed repeat". Cut scenes included "some of the particularly gory scenes" and an exchange between Gwen and Jack which implied the latter performing oral sex on an alien. The dialogue in Gwen and Rhys' big argument was also censored with two instances of the phrase "piss off!" being removed, whilst Rhys' line "you fucking him (Jack), or what?" was redubbed to the less profane "you seeing him, or what?". The edited repeat had an air time of 49m 33s, as opposed to the original episode's air time of 50m 15s. Overnight ratings suggested that the pre-watershed version of the episode was viewed by 1.00 million viewers and had a 4.9% audience share. Final figures released by BARB indicated that the total viewing figures for the BBC3 repeat and the pre-watershed BBC2 repeat were 0.37 million viewers and 1.09 million viewers respectively, giving the episode an aggregated total of 4.74 million viewers across its three initial broadcasts.

A corresponding 10-minute episode of Torchwood Declassified, a behind the scenes documentary on the production of the show, entitled "Save the Whale" was broadcast on BBC Two following the episode between 9.50pm and 10pm and featured contributions from Tregenna, Davies, Teague, Myles and Owen.

=== Reception ===
Previewing the episode as one of his TV choices for the day, The Guardian's Gareth McClean stated that amongst "the snarling, shouting and awful, contrived sexual tension between Captain Pratt and the team, there's an interesting idea here — the consequences of leading a double life." He described Gwen as "the moral centre of the show" and joked that her "nice-but-dim boyfriend" must be the last person in Cardiff not to know of Torchwood's existence. He concluded by stating "that a giant telepathic alien manatee is involved should by no means discourage viewing." The Daily Mirror's Jane Simon also selected the episode as her single pick of the day, praising scenes where Rhys and Torchwood formulate their infiltration plan as containing "the kind of sharp, sarcastic banter that made Buffy such fun to watch". However, she felt that it was a "shame they can't keep it up for the entire episode." Ben Rawson-Jones of Digital Spy gave the episode four out of five stars, feeling it to be a "juicy treat to devour, combining heightened drama, genuine emotion and nice touches of humour." He praised the decision to foreground the character of Rhys, the contrast he provided to the operations of the Torchwood team and the realism of the arguments between him and Gwen. He also felt that the episode's "eco-friendly plot" made it easy to sympathise with the alien space whale stating "the emotive howls of pain, big puppy-dog eyes and heartfelt score all [combined] to test the tear ducts." However, he criticised the human antagonists for being "two-dimensional plot functions rather than humans" and pointed out the "moral black hole" of Torchwood continuing to buy meat products despite condemning the plight of the space whale. Richard Edwards of SFX magazine also gave the episode four stars, feeling it highlighted how the "series has evolved" in that "the in-fighting and gratuitous swearing have been replaced with slick dialogue that sizzles with humour and drama – not to mention a team that feels like a properly cohesive unit." He also praised the increased role of Rhys and opined that the episode made the relationship between him and Gwen "the show's most believable." However, he felt that Jack, as the leader of a top secret organisation, should have pressed harder to have Rhys' memory wiped.

Alan Stanley Blair of Airlock Alpha gave the episode a mixed review. He felt it was refreshing to have a story about aliens that weren't invading and opined that "the brutal scenes at the abattoir and the whale-like moans of agony from the beast tug on a few heartstrings." However, he criticised the realisation of the alien describing it as "basically a giant, moaning turd sitting in the middle of a warehouse" and "a large lump of putty with eyes". He felt that the episode gave Rhys "a chance to step into the spotlight for a change and prove he has what it takes to carry a story" and felt his reaction to the existence of aliens to be "perhaps the most realistic that the genre has produced". Despite this, he felt that Rhys finding out about Torchwood put an end to the "fun" of Gwen "keeping secrets and concealing her double life" and expressed disappointment that Jack didn't wipe his memory at the end of the episode. Travis Fickett of IGN rated the episode 7.6 on a one to ten scale and felt it provided a "messy, odd and somewhat unsettling twist on alien encounters" but felt the episode had several weak points. He felt it was hard not to see Rhys as "a buffoon" and questioned why Torchwood would use a civilian during a sting operation. He also felt that it pushed "beyond the limits of its capacity to create convincing special effects" and the creature itself looked like "a hand puppet". Andrew Mickel of Den of Geek felt that Rhys has always been the "Welsh heart of the show" and praised his role in the episode for being "actually rather entertaining, approaching everything with invigorating gusto." However he also criticised the denouement of the episode for being "daftly mawkish" and opined that "it’s always impossible to care about CGI characters".

Jason Hughes of AOL TV felt the creature to look like a "sock puppet when it was loose and flailing about angrily" and felt this to be "almost like a nod to old Doctor Who, which had awesomely awful special effects at times". He also felt that Rhys becoming aware of Torchwood "adds a new and interesting dynamic to the show." Stephen Frank, writing for the gay and bisexual male entertainment site AfterElton indicated that he was "all in favour" of getting "to know our favorite Cardiff cuckold [Rhys] a little bit better". Though critical of Gwen's characterisation in previous episodes, he praised her defense of Rhys' memories at the end of the episode as her "finest moment on this show" and stated that it "helps rehabilitate her". He stated overall that "Meat" had "performed something of a minor miracle in the way it’s made me reassess my views of both Gwen and Rhys and their relationship." Alasdair Stewart of Firefox News felt that Tregenna had written some of the strongest episodes of the series in the past and stated the episode "should be one of the highlights of the series" but "instead, it's a mess". He criticised the plausibility of the villains, the poor special effects of the alien and the incompetency of the Torchwood team, describing the episode as containing a "total lack of consistency" and "a total lack of basic understanding of what Torchwood are supposed to be capable of". He felt Kai Owen provided "a bright spot in the episode" describing him as "clearly a powerhouse of an actor" and opining that "the scenes where he uncorks on first Eve Myles and then John Barrowman" also brought out "the best in both actors". Conversely, io9's Charlie Jane Anders felt the alien half of the episode to be "one of the best examples of a humans-are-the-real-monsters story ever" but felt that "the other half of the episode was Torchwood at its rock-bottom worst". She criticised the argument scenes stating: "I was having psychic chunks carved off me by a man in a yellow helmet, every time Gwen screamed at Rhys or Jack" and felt overall that the episode contained "too much screaming". She enjoyed the innuendos made by Jack, but criticised the scene where Gwen stared "psycho-killerishly" at him whilst kissing Rhys.

John Beresford of TV Scoop felt that "Meat" finally provided "a story that was well conceived, realised and paced" opining that at last "Torchwood came of age" and that it was "easily the best Torchwood story so far." He did have some problems such as "really pathetic alien, the odd off-colour innuendo about alien "meat" and the lazy convenience of the amnesia pills" but felt that these were relatively minor. The strongest points of the episode for him were the acting which he felt to be "uniformly better than usual and on occasion almost incandescent" and the dialogue which was "so natural it didn’t actually sound like "dialogue" at all". Stephen James Walker, in his own analysis of the episode, gave a mostly favourable review. He criticised the alien space whale as the "one less-than-wonderful" aspect of the episode but praised the opening sequence and the use of the "bleak industrial setting" by director Colin Teague. He felt that the expanded role of Rhys was one of the most pleasing aspects of the scripts and praised the humorous interactions that constituted "male bonding" between him and Jack. He singled out a scene where Gwen turns "a gesture of affection" toward Rhys "into a teasing come-on" to Jack by making eye-contact with the latter whilst kissing the former as characteristic of the "moral ambiguity" which makes her "such a great character". He also felt that whilst they did not have much to do, Tosh, Owen and Ianto had some good scenes which further demonstrated "Tregenna's adeptness at handling the show's regular characters".
