= Dead Man Walking (Torchwood) =

2008 Torchwood episode

20 – "Dead Man Walking"
- Torchwood episode

Cast
- Starring: John Barrowman – Captain Jack Harkness; Eve Myles – Gwen Cooper; Burn Gorman – Owen Harper; Naoko Mori – Toshiko Sato; Gareth David-Lloyd – Ianto Jones; Freema Agyeman – Martha Jones
- Others: Kai Owen – Rhys Williams; Skye Bennett – Little Girl; Paul Kasey – Weevil; Joanna Griffiths – Nurse; Ben Walker – Jamie Burton; Lauren Phillips – Hen Night Girl; Golda Rosheuvel – Doctor; Janie Booth – Hospital Patient; Rhys Ap William – Police Officer

Production
- Directed by: Andy Goddard
- Written by: Matt Jones
- Script editor: Gary Russell
- Produced by: Richard Stokes; Chris Chibnall (co-producer)
- Executive producers: Russell T Davies; Julie Gardner
- Music by: Ben Foster
- Production code: 2.7
- Series: Series 2
- Running time: 50 mins
- First broadcast: 27 February 2008

Chronology
← Preceded by "Reset"	Followed by → "A Day in the Death"

"Dead Man Walking" is the seventh episode of the second series of British science fiction television series Torchwood. It was broadcast by BBC Three and BBC HD on 20 February 2008; it made its terrestrial debut on BBC Two on 27 February.

In the episode, Death uses the recently undead Torchwood team member Owen Harper (Burn Gorman) as a bridgehead to come through to Earth. Death seeks to take thirteen lives to remain on Earth permanently.

== Plot ==
=== Synopsis ===
Jack revives Owen using a resurrection glove, similar to the one used by Suzie and Gwen, (Note: Suzie uses the glove in the 2006 episode "Everything Changes", while Gwen uses it in the 2006 episode "They Keep Killing Suzie".) after finding it in an abandoned church guarded by Weevils, as he does not wish to give up on Owen. As with Suzie, Owen was brought back from death permanently, although this time there is no obvious source. No energy was drained from Jack, as Suzie was draining energy from Gwen, (Note: As depicted in the 2006 episode "They Keep Killing Suzie".) but Owen is getting energy from somewhere. Owen has visions of himself shrouded in darkness and hearing whispers. He also temporarily loses control of his body when his eyes turn black and he speaks in an unknown language. Owen heads to a bar, where he discovers that his bodily processes have stopped, even though he still has electrical activity in the brain. Jack finds him and a brawl ensues, which results in their being arrested. Once outside, they encounter Weevils who chase them onto a rooftop. They are surprised to see the Weevils bow to Owen, who addresses the Weevils in the unknown language.

Upon analysis, it is found that Owen's cells are changing, and upon 100% transformation something will happen. Research shows that a similar situation occurred in legend, and that Death came back with the revived person and searched for 13 victims, whose consumed souls would enable Death to remain in the world. The story details that "Faith" prevented it. Owen suggests that his neural pathways should be closed by being embalmed. During the process, the glove attacks Martha, ageing her rapidly. Owen shoots the gauntlet. Controlling Owen, Death then says, "I will walk the earth forever, and my hunger shall know no bounds".

Death arrives at the hospital along with Torchwood to take 12 souls. Ianto, monitoring Martha, explains that the "Faith" which defeated Death was actually a resurrected child named Faith. When Torchwood evacuates the hospital, Owen realises that he is the only one who can defeat Death as he is dead. Owen fights Death, consuming its energy and forcing it back into the darkness, also restoring Martha to her original age. In the Hub, Martha explains that the energy keeping Owen undead is dissipating, and she is unsure how long it will last.

=== Continuity ===
- The use of a second resurrection gauntlet leads to many references to that used by Suzie Costello in "Everything Changes" and "They Keep Killing Suzie". Ianto reprises his line "That's the thing about gloves - they come in pairs..." from the latter episode.
- Jack states in "They Keep Killing Suzie" that the first resurrection gauntlet fell through the rift approximately forty years earlier and lay at the bottom of Cardiff Bay until the team dredged it, without stating when the dredging occurred. Ianto tells Martha in this episode that it was dredged "last year".
- "Dead Man Walking" was the title of the Torchwood Declassified episode which accompanied the Series 1 episode, "Random Shoes".
- The mysterious little girl is seen again, more than a century earlier, in "Fragments." In this episode she specifically says "I've been waiting to see the Captain again," possibly referring to that earlier encounter.
- Owen tells the police to call his work phone and ask for "PC Cooper", confirming Gwen's statement to Rhys in "Day One" that her position with Torchwood is a secondment and that she retains her warrant and rank.

== Reception ==
IGN complained that "this episode leaves much to be desired and placed an emphasis on style over substance, and even then – some of that style was downright shoddy." Digital Spy, on the other hand, praised the episode as "full of thrills and witty writing that is underpinned by a sublime, multi-layered performance from Burn Gorman."
