= List of Torchwood episodes =

Title card used during the first two series of Torchwood

Torchwood is a British science fiction television programme created by Russell T Davies for the British Broadcasting Corporation (BBC). Initially developed as a stand-alone show, it was reworked into a spin-off of the long-running television production Doctor Who. Originally targeted towards adult audiences, compared to the family-centric nature of its parent series, the first series of Torchwood was broadcast after-watershed. It premiered on BBC Three on 22 October 2006 and aired 13 episodes before concluding on 1 January 2007. A second series was commissioned thereafter with the programme moving to BBC Two. When Captain Jack Harkness, a central character in the show, became popular with younger audiences, alternative cuts of the second series were made which removed adult content allowing a broader audience to view the episodes. BBC Two broadcast the second series, also consisting of 13 episodes, between 16 January and 4 April 2008, although BBC Three aired seven first-run episodes from 13 February to 21 March.

In its final two series, Torchwood utilised serial storytelling rather than the monster of the week format that was present in the first two. The programme moved channels once more when a five-episode mini-series subtitled Children of Earth was broadcast on BBC One from 6 to 10 July in 2009. The fourth and final series became an American co-production with the U.S. premium cable network Starz. Subtitled Miracle Day, the 10-episode fourth series aired on Starz from 8 July until 9 September 2011, with each episode being broadcast on BBC One six days later.

Torchwood is an anagram of Doctor Who which was used as a title ruse during early production of the latter's 2005 revival process. The term was later seeded in that programme's second series. The show centres around the titular organisation called Torchwood. The institute employs several elite teams of black operatives that investigate extraterrestrial incidents on Earth. Torchwood specifically centres around one of these groups, Cardiff's Torchwood Three, which is led by Captain Jack Harkness, who was first introduced in Doctor Who's first series as a companion of the Ninth Doctor. He is assisted by support officer Ianto Jones, Dr. Owen Harper, technical expert Toshiko Sato, and Gwen Cooper, a police constable recruited to assist the team. They are further aided by former Tenth Doctor companion Martha Jones in the second series and Gwen's husband Rhys Williams, who becomes a main character beginning with series three. Miracle Day sees a partial overhaul in the cast with only Harkness, Cooper, and Williams remaining. The three are joined by special agent Rex Matheson and analyst Esther Drummond from the Central Intelligence Agency, as well as death row inmate Oswald Danes. Across all four series, Torchwood had a small number of crossovers with Doctor Who, making up two of the television series in the Whoniverse.

In 2012 the show was placed on an indefinite hiatus although Harkness continued to appear in Doctor Who with appearances in both 2020 and 2021. The first two series of Torchwood were led by Chris Chibnall as head writer while Davies returned as showrunner for the final two. Over its run, the show explored a number of themes; prominent among these were existentialism, homosexual and bisexual relationships, and explorations of human corruptibility. The programme also has a large amount of tie-in media leading to an expanded universe. It was also broadcast in several other countries gaining a cult following as well as strong viewing figures and international critical acclaim. During the course of the programme, 41 episodes of Torchwood aired over four series, between 22 October 2006 and 9 September 2011.

== Series overview ==
Series overview of Torchwood.
Series	Episodes	Originally released (UK)			Average viewers (millions)
Series	Episodes	First released	Last released	Network	Average viewers (millions)
1	13	22 October 2006	1 January 2007	BBC Three	1.42
2	13	16 January 2008	4 April 2008	BBC Two (Note: Episodes 6–12 were first broadcast on BBC Three one week earlier than the date listed in the table, with the exception of episode 11, which first aired on BBC Three two days prior.)	3.27
3: Children of Earth	5	6 July 2009	10 July 2009	BBC One	6.47
4: Miracle Day	10	14 July 2011 (Note: The Starz broadcast of this series began and concluded six days before the UK dates listed.)	15 September 2011	Starz / BBC One	5.17

== Episodes ==
=== Series 1 (2006–07) ===
Series 1 focuses on Gwen Cooper, her first meeting with Jack Harkness, and her introduction to Torchwood; as well as introducing the characters of Owen Harper, Ianto Jones, Suzie Costello, and Toshiko Sato. There is also a loose plot arc centring around the rift; Owen's love of Diane, a woman lost in time; and Owen and Gwen's affair, as well as her relationship to her boyfriend Rhys.

List of Torchwood series 1 episodes
No. overall	No. in series	Title	Directed by	Written by	Original release date	Prod. code	UK viewers (millions)
1	1	"Everything Changes"	Brian Kelly	Russell T Davies	22 October 2006	1.1	2.52
2	2	"Day One"	Brian Kelly	Chris Chibnall	22 October 2006	1.2	2.50
3	3	"Ghost Machine"	Colin Teague	Helen Raynor	29 October 2006	1.3	1.77
4	4	"Cyberwoman"	James Strong	Chris Chibnall	5 November 2006	1.4	1.39
5	5	"Small Worlds"	Alice Troughton	Peter J. Hammond	12 November 2006	1.5	1.26
6	6	"Countrycide"	Andy Goddard	Chris Chibnall	19 November 2006	1.6	1.22
7	7	"Greeks Bearing Gifts"	Colin Teague	Toby Whithouse	26 November 2006	1.7	1.31
8	8	"They Keep Killing Suzie"	James Strong	Paul Tomalin & Daniel McCulloch	3 December 2006	1.8	1.12
9	9	"Random Shoes"	James Erskine	Jacquetta May	10 December 2006	1.9	1.08
10	10	"Out of Time"	Alice Troughton	Catherine Tregenna	17 December 2006	1.10	1.03
11	11	"Combat"	Andy Goddard	Noel Clarke	24 December 2006	1.11	0.83
12	12	"Captain Jack Harkness"	Ashley Way	Catherine Tregenna	1 January 2007	1.12	1.23
13	13	"End of Days"	Ashley Way	Chris Chibnall	1 January 2007	1.13	1.23

=== Series 2 (2008) ===
Series 2 focuses on the disappearance of Jack and his subsequent return, as well as his past; and also introduces the mysterious yet dangerous character named John Hart.

List of Torchwood series 2 episodes
No. overall	No. in series	Title	Directed by	Written by	Original release date	Prod. code	UK viewers (millions)
14	1	"Kiss Kiss, Bang Bang"	Ashley Way	Chris Chibnall	16 January 2008	2.1	4.22
15	2	"Sleeper"	Colin Teague	James Moran	23 January 2008	2.2	3.78
16	3	"To the Last Man"	Andy Goddard	Helen Raynor	30 January 2008	2.3	3.51
17	4	"Meat"	Colin Teague	Catherine Tregenna	6 February 2008	2.4	3.28
18	5	"Adam"	Andy Goddard	Catherine Tregenna	13 February 2008	2.5	3.79
19	6	"Reset"	Ashley Way	J. C. Wilsher	20 February 2008	2.6	3.22 (Note: This episode received 849,000 viewers in its initial broadcast on BBC Three.)
20	7	"Dead Man Walking"	Andy Goddard	Matt Jones	27 February 2008	2.7	3.31 (Note: This episode received 1.01 million viewers in its initial broadcast on BBC Three.)
21	8	"A Day in the Death"	Andy Goddard	Joseph Lidster	5 March 2008	2.8	3.08 (Note: This episode received 1.18 million viewers in its initial broadcast on BBC Three.)
22	9	"Something Borrowed"	Ashley Way	Phil Ford	12 March 2008	2.9	2.76 (Note: This episode received 980,000 viewers in its initial broadcast on BBC Three.)
23	10	"From Out of the Rain"	Jonathan Fox Bassett	Peter J. Hammond	19 March 2008	2.10	2.90 (Note: This episode received 951,000 viewers in its initial broadcast on BBC Three.)
24	11	"Adrift"	Mark Everest	Chris Chibnall	21 March 2008	2.11	2.52 (Note: This episode received 972,000 viewers in its initial broadcast on BBC Three.)
25	12	"Fragments"	Jonathan Fox Bassett	Chris Chibnall	28 March 2008	2.12	2.98 (Note: This episode received 717,000 viewers in its initial broadcast on BBC Three.)
26	13	"Exit Wounds"	Ashley Way	Chris Chibnall	4 April 2008	2.13	3.13

=== Series 3: Children of Earth (2009) ===
Series 3 centres around the 456, a mysterious alien race who make contact to Earth via the world's children, and presents how the world's governments react to solve the problem. It also focuses on Jack and Ianto's relationship, as well as that of Gwen and Rhys.

List of Torchwood: Children of Earth episodes
No. overall	No. in series	Title	Directed by	Written by	Original release date	Prod. code	UK viewers (millions)
27	1	"Day One"	Euros Lyn	Russell T Davies	6 July 2009	3.1	6.47
28	2	"Day Two"	Euros Lyn	John Fay	7 July 2009	3.2	6.14
29	3	"Day Three"	Euros Lyn	Russell T Davies & James Moran	8 July 2009	3.3	6.40
30	4	"Day Four"	Euros Lyn	John Fay	9 July 2009	3.4	6.76
31	5	"Day Five"	Euros Lyn	Russell T Davies	10 July 2009	3.5	6.58

=== Series 4: Miracle Day (2011) ===
Series 4 centres on an event called Miracle Day, when everyone in the world stops dying and subsequently becomes immortal. It also focuses on Jack's past and his immortality, as well as Gwen and Rhys's relationship. It also introduces new characters such as Rex Matheson, Esther Drummond, and Oswald Danes.

List of Torchwood: Miracle Day episodes
No. overall	No. in series	Title	Directed by	Written by	Original U.S. release date	Original UK release date	Prod. code	UK viewers (millions)
32	1	"The New World"	Bharat Nalluri	Russell T Davies	8 July 2011	14 July 2011	401	6.59
33	2	"Rendition"	Billy Gierhart	Doris Egan	15 July 2011	21 July 2011	402	5.75
34	3	"Dead of Night"	Billy Gierhart	Jane Espenson	22 July 2011	28 July 2011	403	5.49
35	4	"Escape to L.A."	Billy Gierhart	Story by : Jim Gray; Teleplay by : Jim Gray & John Shiban	29 July 2011	4 August 2011	404	5.19
36	5	"The Categories of Life"	Guy Ferland	Jane Espenson	5 August 2011	11 August 2011	405	5.17
37	6	"The Middle Men"	Guy Ferland	John Shiban	12 August 2011	18 August 2011	406	4.60
38	7	"Immortal Sins"	Gwyneth Horder-Payton	Jane Espenson	19 August 2011	25 August 2011	407	4.48
39	8	"End of the Road"	Gwyneth Horder-Payton	Story by : Ryan Scott; Teleplay by : Ryan Scott & Jane Espenson	26 August 2011	1 September 2011	408	4.64
40	9	"The Gathering"	Guy Ferland	John Fay	2 September 2011	8 September 2011	409	4.63
41	10	"The Blood Line"	Billy Gierhart	Story by : Russell T Davies; Teleplay by : Russell T Davies & Jane Espenson	9 September 2011	15 September 2011	410	5.13

== Ratings ==
Torchwood : UK viewers per episode (millions)

Series	Episode number													Average
Series	1	2	3	4	5	6	7	8	9	10	11	12	13	Average
1	2.52	2.50	1.77	1.39	1.26	1.22	1.31	1.12	1.08	1.03	0.83	1.23	1.23	1.42
2	4.22	3.78	3.51	3.28	3.79	3.22	3.31	3.08	2.76	2.90	2.52	2.98	3.13	3.27
3	6.47	6.14	6.40	6.76	6.58	–								6.47
4	6.59	5.75	5.49	5.19	5.17	4.60	4.48	4.64	4.63	5.13	–			5.17

Audience measurement performed by Broadcasters' Audience Research Board

== Torchwood Declassified ==
Torchwood Declassified covers themes presented in the just-broadcast episode, as well as providing behind-the-scenes access and footage. Each episode is ten minutes long.

=== Declassified series overview ===
Series	Episodes	Originally released		
Series	Episodes	First released	Last released	Network
1	13	19 October 2006	1 January 2007	BBC Three
2	13	23 January 2008	4 April 2008	BBC Two
3	1	13 July 2009		Direct-to-video
4	2	14 November 2011		Direct-to-video

=== Series 1 ===
No. overall	No. in series	Title	Torchwood episode	Original release date
1	–	"Welcome to Torchwood"	Preview of Torchwood	19 October 2006
2	1	"Jack's Back"	"Everything Changes"	23 October 2006
3	2	"Bad Day at the Office"	"Day One"	23 October 2006
4	3	"Living History"	"Ghost Machine"	30 October 2006
5	4	"Girl Trouble"	"Cyberwoman"	6 November 2006
6	5	"Away with the Fairies"	"Small Worlds"	13 November 2006
7	6	"The Country Club"	"Countrycide"	20 November 2006
8	7	"There's Something About Mary"	"Greeks Bearing Gifts"	27 November 2006
9	8	"Beyond the Grave"	"They Keep Killing Suzie"	4 December 2006
10	9	"Dead Man Walking"	"Random Shoes"	11 December 2006
11	10	"Time Flies"	"Out of Time"	18 December 2006
12	11	"Weevil Fight Club"	"Combat"	25 December 2006
13	12	"Blast from the Past"	"Captain Jack Harkness"	1 January 2007
14	13	"To The End"	"End of Days"	1 January 2007

=== Series 2 ===
No. overall	No. in series	Title	Torchwood episode	Original release date
15	1	"Home and Hart"	"Kiss Kiss, Bang Bang"	23 January 2008
16	2	"Sleepless in Cardiff"	"Sleeper"	24 January 2008
17	3	"Step Back in Time"	"To the Last Man"	31 January 2008
18	4	"Save the Whale"	"Meat"	7 February 2008
19	5	"Past Imperfect"	"Adam"	14 February 2008
20	6	"Animal Pharm"	"Reset"	20 February 2008
21	7	"Death Defying"	"Dead Man Walking"	28 February 2008
22	8	"Dead Eyes Open"	"A Day in the Death"	6 March 2008
23	9	"Something New"	"Something Borrowed"	13 March 2008
24	10	"In Living Colour"	"From Out of the Rain"	19 March 2008
25	11	"Quid Pro Quo"	"Adrift"	21 March 2008
26	12	"Clean Slate"	"Fragments"	28 March 2008
27	13	"Avulsion"	"Exit Wounds"	4 April 2008

=== Series 3 ===
No. overall	No. in series	Title	Torchwood episode	Original release date
28	1	"Cracking Children of Earth"	Torchwood: Children of Earth	13 July 2009

=== Series 4 ===
No. overall	No. in series	Title	Torchwood episode	Original release date
29	1	"Behind the Scenes"	Torchwood: Miracle Day	14 November 2011
30	2	"FX Special on Miracle Day"	Torchwood: Miracle Day	14 November 2011

== See also ==
- List of Doctor Who episodes (2005–present)
- List of Torchwood comics
- List of Torchwood novels and audio books
- Torchwood (audio drama series)
- Torchwood Declassified
