= Exit Wounds (Torchwood) =

2008 Torchwood episode

26 – "Exit Wounds"
- Torchwood episode

Cast
- Starring: John Barrowman – Captain Jack Harkness; Eve Myles – Gwen Cooper; Burn Gorman – Owen Harper; Naoko Mori – Toshiko Sato; Gareth David-Lloyd – Ianto Jones
- Others: Kai Owen – Rhys Williams; James Marsters – Captain John Hart; Tom Price – PC Andy; Lachlan Nieboer – Gray; Paul Kasey – Weevil; Golda Rosheuvel – Dr Angela Connolly; Syreeta Kumar – Nira Docherty; Cornelius Macarthy – Charles Gaskell; Amy Manson – Alice Guppy

Production
- Directed by: Ashley Way
- Written by: Chris Chibnall
- Script editor: Brian Minchin
- Produced by: Richard Stokes; Chris Chibnall (co-producer)
- Executive producers: Russell T Davies; Julie Gardner
- Music by: Murray Gold; Ben Foster
- Production code: 2.13
- Series: Series 2
- Running time: 50 mins
- First broadcast: 4 April 2008

Chronology
← Preceded by "Fragments"	Followed by → Children of Earth (serial) "Lost Souls" (radio play)

"Exit Wounds" is the thirteenth and final episode of the second series of the British science fiction television series Torchwood, and was broadcast on BBC Two on 4 April 2008. It marked the final appearance of Burn Gorman as Owen Harper and Naoko Mori as Toshiko Sato, with both characters being killed off at the end of the episode. It is also the final Torchwood episode in its original format.

In the episode, Gray (Lachlan Nieboer), the brother of Jack Harkness (John Barrowman), punishes Jack for abandoning him long ago by having Jack buried underground in the past. Meanwhile, Gray has also ordered the detonation of bombs throughout Cardiff, leaving the remaining members of Jack's team of Torchwood preoccupied with saving Cardiff.

== Plot ==
=== Synopsis ===
Torchwood split up to investigate three instances of Rift activity. At the Torchwood Hub, Captain John Hart shoots Jack and takes him to Cardiff Castle. There and at the three other locations, the team watch as John systematically detonates several bombs across Cardiff. John then transports himself and Jack to Cardiff in 27 AD, where John explains that he was forced to do what he did by Jack's brother, Gray, and has been forced to wear a bomb and surveillance equipment on a wristband molecularly bonded to his skin. Gray arrives and forces John to dig a grave for Jack to be buried alive in, in response to leaving Gray behind. John drops a ring into the grave.

In the present, Gwen, Rhys, and Andy help to organise the police to maintain order in the city while the rest of Torchwood attempt to repair the damage. John returns to present and helps Torchwood, now that the wristband has unbonded after John's deal with Gray is complete. Torchwood learn that the Turnmill Nuclear Power Plant will soon go into meltdown. Gray, having returned to the present, releases Weevils which block access to the plant. Owen, whom the creatures have worshipped since his return from death, (Note: As depicted in the 2008 episode "Dead Man Walking".) enters the plant untouched while Toshiko helps him with the plant's control system via radio. Gwen, Ianto, and John sedate three Weevils that attacked the police station, and drag them to the holding cells. Once in the cells, though, Gray locks the three inside, then shoots Toshiko.

Gray discovers Jack alive in the Hub's morgue; the signal from John's ring was discovered by Torchwood in 1901 and Jack urged the team from that era to keep him in cryogenic storage until the present. Jack apologises to Gray and asks for his forgiveness but Gray refuses, forcing Jack to sedate him. Jack frees his teammates from their cells. Meanwhile, a still-wounded Toshiko tells Owen over the radio how to vent the irradiated coolant into the control room. Owen successfully completes the procedure, but before he can make his escape, a power surge triggers the lockdown mechanism and Owen is trapped. The two say their goodbyes to each other as the control room is flooded with radiation and Toshiko dies of her wounds.

Jack places Gray's body in cryogenic storage, refusing to kill him, stating there has already been too much death.

=== Continuity ===
- A Hoix creature from the parent series Doctor Who in its 2006 episode "Love & Monsters" appears in this episode. This is the first time it is named by a character onscreen.
- Owen refers to his status as "King of the Weevils", first mentioned in "Dead Man Walking" and foreshadowed in "Combat".
- When Owen Harper and Toshiko Sato are discussing their early days together, Tosh describes pretending to be a medic in Owen's second week, to cover for him having a hangover. Owen asks if this was "the space pig" incident, referring to Naoko Mori's appearance as Doctor Sato, a presumed pathologist in the Doctor Who story "Aliens of London".
- Paul Marc Davis, who plays the Cowled Leader, previously played the Futurekind Chieftain in the Doctor Who episode "Utopia" and the Trickster in The Sarah Jane Adventures story Whatever Happened to Sarah Jane?. He is the second actor to appear in all three series, the first being Paul Kasey.
