= Adam (Torchwood) =

2008 Torchwood episode

18 – "Adam"
- Torchwood episode
- Adam looks on at Gwen after having manipulated her memory.

Cast
- Starring: John Barrowman – Captain Jack Harkness; Gareth David-Lloyd - Ianto Jones; Eve Myles – Gwen Cooper; Burn Gorman – Owen Harper; Naoko Mori – Toshiko Sato
- Others: Kai Owen – Rhys Williams; Bryan Dick – Adam Smith; Paul Kasey – Weevil; Demetri Goritsas – Jack's Father; Lauren Ward – Jack's Mother; Jack Montgomery – Young Jack; Ethan Brooke – Gray; Rhys Myers – Young Adam; Lloyd Everitt – Youth; Jo McLaren – Dead woman

Production
- Directed by: Andy Goddard
- Written by: Catherine Tregenna
- Script editor: Brian Minchin
- Produced by: Richard Stokes; Chris Chibnall (co-producer)
- Executive producers: Russell T Davies; Julie Gardner
- Music by: Ben Foster
- Production code: 2.5
- Series: Series 2
- Running time: 50 mins
- First broadcast: 13 February 2008

Chronology
← Preceded by "Meat"	Followed by → "Reset"

"Adam" is the fifth episode of the second series of British science fiction television series Torchwood, which was broadcast on BBC Two on 13 February 2008.

In the episode, a parasitic alien called Adam Smith (Bryan Dick) arrives in Cardiff and adds false memories of himself into the minds of the alien-hunting team Torchwood. This subsequently causes memories to be lost and resurfaced among the team.

== Plot ==
Torchwood encounter an alien, Adam, who has the ability of memory manipulation. By implanting false memories into each team member, making them believe they have known him for three years, Adam's manipulation changes the team dramatically: Gwen loses all memory of Rhys, Jack is haunted by memories of his lost brother Gray, from whom he was separated as a child on the Boeshane Peninsula, Toshiko has become more confident and believes that she and Adam are in love, and Owen has become less cynical and selfish.

After reading his diary, Ianto becomes disturbed when he notices there is no mention of Adam. Adam confronts him and implants false memories into Ianto's mind, leading Ianto to believe he is a serial killer. Jack returns to find Ianto deeply upset but refuses to believe that Ianto is a killer. The pair search Torchwood's files, discovering the truth after seeing footage of Adam implanting the memories into Ianto. Jack discovers that the team needs to take amnesia pills, to erase their memories of the past forty-eight hours. He gathers the team and asks each person to try to recall who they really are. Each member takes their pill.

As they fall asleep, Jack returns to the cells to find Adam disappearing as a result of the memory erasure. Adam offers Jack the last happy memory of his childhood, before he lost Gray and before his father died. Adam then appears in the memory, threatening that if he dies, Jack will never regain any other memories of his father. Adam reveals that a mysterious box Torchwood found contains Jack's lost memories and that if Adam dies, so will they. Jack takes the pill, killing Adam.

=== Continuity ===
- The opening montage features the Dalek-enhanced Thompson submachine guns created for "Evolution of the Daleks" and was re-edited to include footage of Adam as a member of Torchwood.
- The Boeshane Peninsula, first mentioned in "Last of the Time Lords", is depicted here.
- Reference is made to the creatures who attacked Jack's family, first mentioned in "Captain Jack Harkness". Who or what they are is still unknown.
- We learn that "Gray", first mentioned in "Kiss Kiss, Bang Bang", is Jack's younger brother. In the earlier episode, Captain John Hart claimed to have found him.
- Adam states he used to reside in The Void, the nothingness between dimensions.
- The episode makes use of a newspaper cutting on the front door of the Torchwood foyer, seen previously in the Doctor Who episode "Boom Town," however no reference is made to it during the episode.
