= Captain Jack Harkness (Torchwood episode) =

2007 Torchwood episode

12 – "Captain Jack Harkness"
- Torchwood episode

Cast
- Starring: John Barrowman – Captain Jack Harkness; Eve Myles – Gwen Cooper; Burn Gorman – Owen Harper; Naoko Mori – Toshiko Sato; Gareth David-Lloyd – Ianto Jones
- Others: Murray Melvin – Bilis Manger; Matt Rippy – The Captain; Gavin Brocker – George; Eleyn Rhys – Nancy Floyd; Nadine Beaton – Audrey; Peter Sandys-Clarke – Tim; Ciaran Joyce – Smiler; Melissa Moore – Singer

Production
- Directed by: Ashley Way
- Written by: Catherine Tregenna
- Script editor: Brian Minchin
- Produced by: Richard Stokes; Chris Chibnall (co-producer)
- Executive producers: Russell T Davies; Julie Gardner
- Music by: Murray Gold; Ben Foster
- Production code: 1.12
- Series: Series 1
- Running time: 50 mins
- First broadcast: 1 January 2007

Chronology
← Preceded by "Combat"	Followed by → "End of Days"

"Captain Jack Harkness" is the twelfth episode of the first series of the British science fiction television series Torchwood, which was originally broadcast on the digital television channel BBC Three on 1 January 2007.

In the episode, the alien hunters Jack Harkness (John Barrowman) and Toshiko Sato (Naoko Mori) are brought back in time to a Cardiff dance hall in 1941. Jack discovers the man he took his name from (Matt Rippy), while Tosh looks for a way of sending a message to her Torchwood teammates to bring her and Jack back to the 21st century.

In 2008 "Captain Jack Harkness" was nominated for the Hugo Award for Best Dramatic Presentation, Short Form.

== Plot ==
While investigating an abandoned dance hall, Jack Harkness and Toshiko find themselves having slipped through time and are stuck in 1941, where the dance hall is being used for service personnel. Jack meets the real Captain Jack Harkness, the man whose identity Jack took after his death, which Jack learns will be the following day at a training exercise. Jack and Toshiko recognise that they must find a way to open the Cardiff Rift from the present day in order to get back, and Toshiko begins to work out ways of leaving the necessary equations to the rest of the Torchwood team. Jack learns that the Captain is attracted to him. The two talk some more, with Jack asking if the Captain would like to go elsewhere, but he refuses, acknowledging that Jack has obliquely told him that his remaining time on Earth is limited.

In the present, the rest of the team come to realise Jack and Toshiko are missing in time from photographs taken during the dance, and also determine that the Rift is the only way to bring them back, though Ianto believes it to be too dangerous. As they investigate the dance hall, they meet its proprietor, Bilis Manger. Unknown to them, Bilis is also present at the dance hall in 1941 and has attempted to alter and change the messages that Toshiko is leaving for Torchwood. After finding a missing part of a device used to open the Rift and Toshiko's equations, Owen is prepared to take the chance to open the Rift. Ianto holds him at gunpoint to try to stop it, but Owen refuses, and proceeds to open the Rift. As the dance in 1941 winds down, Captain Harkness invites Jack to dance with him. During the dance, the Rift opens. Jack says his goodbyes to the Captain, giving him a passionate kiss before he and Tosh step through the Rift. They return to Torchwood, where they share a toast to the late Captain Jack Harkness.

== Continuity ==
- Jack refers to "flotsam and jetsam", a running theme throughout the series.
- A fly-poster with the words "Vote Saxon" is seen on the exterior entrance to the dance hall. Mr Saxon is the arc word for Series Three of Doctor Who, and comes into play in the trilogy of episodes that begins with "Utopia". This episode aired prior to the broadcast of Series Three, making this the first appearance on screen of this poster, which appeared numerous times during Series Three of Doctor Who. The character of Mr. Saxon, however, predates this episode, having been previously referenced in the Doctor Who Christmas special, "The Runaway Bride", which aired a week before this episode, and before that in the Series Two episode "Love & Monsters".
- One of the small bollards in the hall has graffiti of a circled P emblem. This was the emblem of the Preachers in the Doctor Who episodes "Rise of the Cybermen" and "The Age of Steel", and also appeared in "Ghost Machine" as graffiti on a bin.
- When Owen is looking for the blueprints of the rift manipulator, the Ghost Machine and the Life Knife are shown.
- The model of the plane on Jack's desk is a P-51 Mustang, specifically the P-51D "Flyng Dutchman" piloted by Lt. Robert J. Goebel of the 308th Fighter Squadron, 31st Fighter Group, 15th U.S. Army Air Force in Italy in late-1944. It refers to the numerous mentions of Jack the pilot in photographs on the show as well as on the website, although the Mustang did not enter service until May 1942, just over a year after the events of this episode.
- The password to Torchwood Jack's safe is Rhea Silvia who in Roman mythology was raped by the God of War Mars and was the mother of Romulus and Remus who founded the city of Rome. The password is used again by Gwen in "End of Days" to open the Rift.
- Toshiko tells Jack that her grandfather was persecuted in London during the war. In "Greeks Bearing Gifts", one of her grandfathers is said to have worked at Bletchley Park during the war.
- At least three, or as many as four Torchwood Jacks exist during the 1941 scenes. In addition to the Jack depicted with Toshiko, his younger self has been working for Torchwood Three for forty-two years. Their older self has been in a cadaver freezer in the hub for forty years. It is unclear whether their younger self has yet arrived, although it is prior to his usurpation of Group Captain Harkness' name and the events of "The Empty Child".
- The device Owen uses to open the safe appears to be the same device that Toshiko uses to open the hub's locks in "Cyberwoman" and which Jack described as being able to open any lock within 45 seconds.
- Owen claims to be second in command. Jack identified Suzie Costello as such in "Everything Changes" and hired Gwen to fill Suzie's vacancy. Gwen is exercising command when Jack returns from his travels with the Doctor and Martha Jones in "Kiss Kiss, Bang Bang".
- Jack tells Toshiko "someone saved my life" after he had taken Harkness' identity, referring to the events of "The Parting of the Ways".
- In the dance hall, as Toshiko and Jack are descending the steps, the graffiti on the wall behind them displays "Bad Wolf", a reference to the running theme in the first series of Doctor Who

== Broadcast ==
This episode was first shown as a double-bill with "End of Days". The two episodes' end credits were merged and shown at the end of the second episode. They were first shown on the same day as the first broadcast of "Invasion of the Bane", the first episode of the Doctor Who spin-off The Sarah Jane Adventures. However, during repeats (and broadcast on BBC HD), they showed the 'next time' trailers. This did not happen on the first day of transmission.

=== Reception ===
"Captain Jack Harkness" was nominated for the 2008 Hugo Award for Best Dramatic Presentation, Short Form.
