= Greeks Bearing Gifts (Torchwood) =

2006 Torchwood episode

07 – "Greeks Bearing Gifts"
- Torchwood episode
- The alien reveals herself to Tosh.

Cast
- Starring: John Barrowman – Captain Jack Harkness; Eve Myles – Gwen Cooper; Burn Gorman – Owen Harper; Naoko Mori – Toshiko Sato; Gareth David-Lloyd – Ianto Jones
- Others: Daniela Denby-Ashe – Mary; Tom Robertson – Soldier; Ravin J Ganatra – Neil; Eiry Thomas – Carol; Shaheen Jafargholi – Danny; Paul Kasey – Weevil

Production
- Directed by: Colin Teague
- Written by: Toby Whithouse
- Script editor: Brian Minchin
- Produced by: Richard Stokes; Chris Chibnall (co-producer)
- Executive producers: Russell T Davies; Julie Gardner
- Music by: Ben Foster
- Production code: 1.7
- Series: Series 1
- Running time: 50 mins
- First broadcast: 26 November 2006

Chronology
| ← Preceded by "Countrycide" | Followed by → "They Keep Killing Suzie" |

"Greeks Bearing Gifts" is the seventh episode of the first series of the British science fiction television series Torchwood, which was originally broadcast on the digital television channel BBC Three on 26 November 2006.

In the episode, a killer shape-changing alien known as Arcateenian called Mary (Daniela Denby-Ashe) has been stranded in Cardiff for nearly two hundred years. She seeks to retrieve a recently unearthed transporter so she can escape the planet Earth.

== Plot ==
Torchwood is called to a building site where a centuries-old human skeleton and a rusted alien artefact have been discovered in the ground. Later, at a local bar, Toshiko meets Mary, a scavenger of alien artefacts that has been following Torchwood. Mary gives Toshiko a pendant that allows her to read minds; Toshiko promises to not tell Torchwood from whom she got it.

The next day as Toshiko examines the pendant, she reads Owen and Gwen's minds, both having dismissive and contemptuous thoughts about her. She races home, only to find Mary there; Toshiko attempts to return the pendant but Mary insists it can be used for good. Mary convinces Toshiko to read her mind again, and reveals sexually explicit intentions for Toshiko. The two spend the night together. The next day, Toshiko asks Mary her true identity but she remains coy, answering "Philoctetes", the name of an archer from Greek mythology who was exiled on an island. Toshiko wears the pendant in a crowded street, and though overwhelmed with the thoughts of everyone, identifies one man preparing to commit murder, and she is able to follow and stop him.

Later, Mary convinces Toshiko to ask the others at the Hub about the artefact, using the pendant as they may be hiding information from her. Toshiko finds Owen lacks any information on the artefact, while she is unable to read Jack's mind. Meanwhile, Owen has discovered that the same trauma that had been inflicted on the skeleton has been reported several times in the last few centuries, while Jack becomes aware of Toshiko's strange behaviour.

When Toshiko returns to Mary, she reveals herself as an alien, an exiled dissident, and that the artefact is a transporter that can help her to leave the planet. Mary asks Toshiko to take her to Torchwood so she can retrieve the artefact herself. At the Hub, they find that Jack has deduced that Mary is an alien and the serial killer. Jack explains that the transporter carried a prisoner, Mary, and a guard, which Mary killed before taking the body of a human woman. Mary holds Toshiko at knifepoint, demanding the artefact. Jack trades Toshiko for the artefact, which Jack reprograms to send Mary to the centre of the sun. Owen and Gwen apologise to Toshiko for their behaviour to her. Jack offers Toshiko the pendant, but she smashes it underfoot.

== Production ==
Mary is a member of the species known as Arcateenians. An Arcateenian later appears in The Sarah Jane Adventures episode "Invasion of the Bane." A letter to Doctor Who Magazine noted "Mary"'s strong resemblance to Destrii, a companion from the magazine's Eighth Doctor comic strips. The magazine's editors concurred with the observation. Later, The Torchwood Archives by Gary Russell specified that Destrii and Mary are from the same system. Destrii's home planet Oblivion along with Devos, Krant and Arcateen IV, V and VI form the Arcan system.

== Outside references ==
- The phrase "Beware Greeks bearing gifts" refers to the Trojan horse described in Virgil's The Aeneid.
