= Day One (Torchwood) =

2006 Torchwood episode

02 – "Day One"
- Torchwood episode
- The Gas takes over Carys's body.

Cast
- Starring: John Barrowman – Captain Jack Harkness; Eve Myles – Gwen Cooper; Burn Gorman – Owen Harper; Naoko Mori – Toshiko Sato; Gareth David-Lloyd – Ianto Jones
- Others: Kai Owen – Rhys Williams; Adrian Christopher – Private Moriarty; Ross O'Hennessy – Sgt. Johnson; Sara Lloyd Gregory – Carys; Ceri Mears – Banksy; Justin McDonald – Matt; Tom Price – P.C. Andy; Brendan Charleson – Ivan Fletcher; Rob Storr – Gavin; Lloyd Everitt – Mikey; Alex Parry – Eddie Gwynne; Felicity Rhys – Bethan; Naomi Martell – Receptionist; Donald Longden – Mr Weston

Production
- Directed by: Brian Kelly
- Written by: Chris Chibnall
- Script editor: Brian Minchin
- Produced by: Richard Stokes; Chris Chibnall (co-producer)
- Executive producers: Russell T Davies; Julie Gardner
- Music by: Murray Gold; Ben Foster
- Production code: 1.2
- Series: Series 1
- Running time: 48 mins
- First broadcast: 22 October 2006

Chronology
← Preceded by "Everything Changes"	Followed by → "Ghost Machine"

"Day One" is the second episode of the first series of the British science fiction television series Torchwood. Directed by Brian Kelly, the episode was first broadcast on the digital channel BBC Three on 22 October 2006 with the series pilot, "Everything Changes", and later repeated on terrestrial channel BBC Two on 25 October. It was the first work in the Doctor Who universe to be written by future Doctor Who showrunner Chris Chibnall.

The episode centres on Gwen Cooper (Eve Myles) working her first case with the alien hunters Torchwood in Cardiff, when she lets loose a purple alien gas that survives on the energy of orgasms. Over the course of the episode, the team hunt for Carys before the gas kills her.

Originally entitled "New Girl", the episode was written to interpret Gwen's "first day in hell". On the sex gas, series creator Russell T Davies stated "when we're launching a new adult science fiction drama, it's kind of inevitable you're going to do the sex monster". The episode was filmed during a three- to four-week period in May 2006, with much of it filmed before the first episode in the same production block. "Day One" was originally seen by 2.3 million viewers, making it one of the highest-rated BBC Three broadcasts of all time, but was met with generally mixed reviews.

== Plot ==
Gwen is called into work at Torchwood early when a meteor falls outside of Cardiff, cutting her date with Rhys short. As the Army secures the area, Torchwood investigate the meteor. Gwen's colleague Owen taunts her by calling her the "new girl". In an attempt to retaliate, she throws a chisel at him, but misses and cracks open the meteor, allowing a purple gaseous entity to escape. The gas finds a young woman, Carys Fletcher, outside a nightclub and takes her host. In the club, a possessed Carys seduces a man and takes him to a restroom, where they proceed to have sex. At the moment of climax, however, the man dissolves into dust while Carys absorbs the energy that remains.

Torchwood become aware of the bizarre death and realises through CCTV that the gas has taken over Carys. They later find where Carys lives and arrive there before she could harm a postman. When she tries to escape, Owen traps her using a portable prison cell. Carys is placed in a holding cell in Torchwood's hub. As tests are run on Carys, Gwen feels uncontrollable urges to kiss her, showing that Carys is emitting high levels of pheromones, effectively becoming a "walking aphrodisiac", but the gas is also slowly killing her. Later, Carys escapes from her cell after seducing Owen.

In an attempt to capture her again, Torchwood run on Toshiko's hunch that she will be after her ex-boyfriend Eddie; they arrive at his house to find Carys already killed him. Later they discover Carys works as a temp at a fertility clinic. They race to the clinic to find Carys has been inside for some time killing some of the clients. After eventually cornering Carys, they find that she has moments before she dies. Jack buys her some time by kissing her, transferring some of his "excess" of life onto her. Gwen offers the gas presence her own body as a host to save Carys. When the gas leaves Carys, Jack throws the portable prison cell at it. Since it cannot survive in Earth's atmosphere for long, the gas dies out. After Carys is safely returned home, Jack advises Gwen not to let the job consume her because her perspective is important to the team. He then encourages Gwen to go home and spend time with Rhys.

== Production ==
=== Writing ===
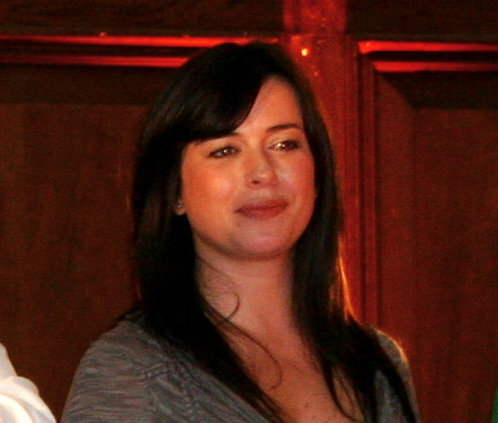
The episode centred on Gwen Cooper, played by Eve Myles (pictured) on her first day working in Torchwood.

The working title for the episode was "New Girl", which changed to the current "Day One" by the beginning of October 2006. Head writer Chris Chibnall, who wrote the episode, found that writing the second episode was hard, as there was a challenge to demonstrate how Torchwood works, and set the formula for the rest of the series. He wanted to write an episode that would centre on Gwen about her "first day in hell", and show the audience that Torchwood is unlike any normal job, as one small mistake can have major ramifications on the city. The scene where Gwen accidentally opens the meteor was meant to "extend the metaphor of breaking the photocopier on your first day at work". It is also set to show the separate dynamic between the team and Gwen. Series creator Russell T Davies stated that as the rest of the team are for the aliens, science, technology and mythology, Gwen is for "the people"; she's the only person in the team who cares about what happens to Carys. Eve Myles also noted in the episode's audio commentary that throughout the episode, it added a mix between her domestic life and the science fiction.

The idea behind using the sex gas came from Chibnall, but he admitted to having "genuinely no idea where the episode came from". Davies stated "when we're launching a new adult science fiction drama, it's kind of inevitable you're going to do the sex monster." He also emphasised that the episode is not solely about "having a laugh" with the sex gas, as it also has "something to say about the world". The scene where Carys walks down the street featuring sex in advertisements and couples kissing in public was one of Davies' favourite scenes in the episode, as it explores how sexualised the Western world is. The episode was originally much lighter in tone, however the majority of the comedic moments had to be cut on the final script, as they got in the way of the plot. Also, Carys was originally meant to have two or three boyfriends, but because of scheduling restrictions, there could only be one. This ended up being beneficial to the episode, as it made it more emotive. There was a scene that would be filmed with Carys and a second boyfriend, but that would be cut and added on the deleted scenes on the DVD boxset of the first series.

After it was written, BBC controller of fiction, Jane Tranter, suggested to the producers that the Torchwood team take a "breather" and talk about the mysteries behind Captain Jack while having a Chinese takeaway. Through the read through of the script before filming, Burn Gorman noted that he saw "big smiles" and giggling from several readers because of its content. Sara Gregory read the script with her mother.

=== Filming ===
Much of the episode was filmed before the pilot in the first production block, as was the pilot episode titled "Everything Changes". It took place during a three- to four-week period in May 2006 in and around Cardiff, the city where the series was set. The majority of the episode was filmed at night, in keeping with the majority of the series. However, because it was approaching summer when nights are shorter, all night sequences had to be shot between 10 pm and 4:30 am. Even the scenes set in the Torchwood hub were mostly filmed at night. The first sequence shot was the scene where the team stop Carys from having sex with the postman. However, the sequence had to be shot again twelve days later.

The meteor crash site was filmed at a natural erosion site just outside of Cardiff. The location managers found the site by chance, and felt it was the perfect location for a crash site. The producers included an easter egg in the Torchwood Hub set by including the picture of Craig-y-Nos Castle, used as a location of the Torchwood House in the Doctor Who episode "Tooth and Claw". At the end of the episode the Torchwood Institute was established by Queen Victoria. To film the kissing scene between Gwen and Carys, actresses Eve Myles and Sara Gregory (respectively) came up with a game plan beforehand to help them get through the scene. It was agreed that Myles would imagine Gregory as Johnny Depp, and Gregory would imagine Myles as Brad Pitt. To film the exploding rat sequence, episode director Brian Kelly filmed a rat in a cage, and then replaced it with a fur covered condom filled with "chicken bits" and red dye to simulate guts, then exploded it with a squib.

=== Post-production ===
"Day One" was the first episode to include a teaser in the beginning with shots from the series. The episode's visual effects were produced by The Mill. To complete the effect of the gas, 3D artist Paul Burton based his design of the alien from the water creature in The Abyss.

== Continuity ==
The Doctor's severed hand appears in this episode when Carys uses it as her bargaining chip to escape.

== Broadcast and reception ==
"Day One" was broadcast on Sunday, 22 October 2006 on BBC Three, just after the first episode, "Everything Changes". The second episode received overnight viewing figures of 2.3 million with a 13.8% audience share, holding the majority of the audience from the first episode. Together both episodes received the largest multichannel audience for a UK-originated non-sports programme and the at the time largest audience for BBC Three. The finale figure for the episode was 2.498 million viewers. The record would be held until the broadcast of EastEnders Live: The Aftermath on 19 February 2010. The repeat of "Day One" on analogue channel BBC Two on 25 October was seen by 2.8 million with a 13% audience share. "Day One" was given an Appreciation Index of 83.

Daniel Montesinos-Donaghy of Den of Geek stated "After the excellent pilot episode, 'Day One' is both a step forward and a step backward. As silly as the idea of a nymphomaniac extra-terrestrial gas is, the cast throw themselves into it with aplomb, quipping their way to the relatively gripping conclusion." Patrick Holm of Total Sci-Fi felt that the second episode "equates the word 'adult' with sex and swearing – more of a playground definition than a serious drama." In the conclusion of his review, Jonathan Capps of Noise to Signal felt that the episode was "certainly nothing to get excited about, but I think it won't be too indicative of later episodes, as we're still getting to know these characters, and that has to take the fore in the first few episodes. However, Chris' [Chibnall] painfully simplistic, heavy-handed and often clichéd interpretation of sci-fi (some of Jack's techno-babble is frankly embarrassing) could prove to be a worrying factor later in the series." A reviewer of TV Fodder felt "Day One" was a "great second episode", adding "there doesn't seem to be anything I don't like about this show".
