= End of Days (Torchwood) =

2007 Torchwood episode

13 – "End of Days"
- Torchwood episode
- Abaddon runs amok over Cardiff.

Cast
- Starring: John Barrowman – Captain Jack Harkness; Eve Myles – Gwen Cooper; Burn Gorman – Owen Harper; Naoko Mori – Toshiko Sato; Gareth David-Lloyd – Ianto Jones
- Others: Kai Owen – Rhys Williams; Murray Melvin – Bilis Manger; Caroline Chikezie – Lisa Hallett; Louise Delamere – Diane Holmes; Tom Price – PC Andy; Matthew Gravelle – Doctor; Noriko Aida – Toshiko's mother; Jamie Belton – Roman soldier; Carrie Gracie – Newsreader; Paul Kasey – Weevil; Rhian Wyn Jones – Religious woman

Production
- Directed by: Ashley Way
- Written by: Chris Chibnall
- Script editor: Brian Minchin
- Produced by: Richard Stokes; Chris Chibnall (co-producer)
- Executive producers: Russell T Davies; Julie Gardner
- Music by: Murray Gold; Ben Foster
- Production code: 1.13
- Series: Series 1
- Running time: 50 mins
- First broadcast: 1 January 2007

Chronology
← Preceded by "Captain Jack Harkness"	Followed by → "Kiss Kiss, Bang Bang"

"End of Days" is the thirteenth and final episode of the first series of the British science fiction television series Torchwood. It originally aired on the digital television channel BBC Three on 1 January 2007, alongside the previous episode, "Captain Jack Harkness". The episode was written by Chris Chibnall and directed by Ashley Way.

Continuing from the events of "Captain Jack Harkness", the episode involves the time-travelling clock seller Bilis Manger (Murray Melvin) manipulating members of a team of alien hunters called Torchwood into opening a rift in time and space which would cause the release of the demon Abaddon.

The episode received three 2008 BAFTA Cymru award nominations, though none of them was won.

== Plot ==
After Owen opened the Rift to rescue Toshiko and Jack, (Note: As depicted in the 2007 episode "Captain Jack Harkness".) the Rift splinters, causing temporal cracks to widen, bringing individuals from different eras to the present day. Jack orders Torchwood to bring anyone that fell through time into Torchwood's vaults.

Toshiko and Owen investigate cases of the Black Death in a local Cardiff hospital, where Toshiko sees a glimpse of her mother, while PC Andy informs Jack and Gwen that they have a Roman soldier in police custody. In that time, Gwen sees a glimpse of Bilis Manger. Ianto sees his dead girlfriend Lisa in the vaults, who tries to convince him to open the Rift. (Note: Lisa was killed in the 2006 episode "Cyberwoman".) During a heated argument, Jack fires Owen. While at a bar, Owen sees Diane, who tries to convince him to open the Rift. (Note: Diane leaves Owen in the 2006 episode "Out of Time".)

Jack and Gwen go to Bilis' clock shop, where they learn that Bilis can step between eras in time. When Jack leaves, Bilis shows Gwen a vision where her boyfriend Rhys dies. Gwen rushes to Rhys and has him imprisoned in the vaults for protection. However, Bilis causes a power cut to raise a security breach in the Hub, releases Rhys, and kills him. Gwen and Jack find Rhys' body in a pool of blood. Jack tells Gwen that they cannot bring him back, but she knows the only hope of restoring him is to open the Rift. All but Jack agree to this. Jack attempts to stop them by holding the team at gunpoint. When he insults them, Owen attacks and kills him, and scans his and the team's retinas and opens the Rift. After Jack comes back to life, they discover that Bilis has manipulated the team to open the Rift, in order to release Abaddon whose shadow kills anyone who touches it. This gives Jack an idea; he cannot die, so it can feed off his life. The shadow attacks Jack, but a blue light flows out of his chest and destroys Abaddon, killing Jack.

The Rift is now closed, but volatile. Gwen is relieved to see Rhys alive. After several days, Jack comes back to life. Jack forgives Owen and hugs him. As the rest of Torchwood go for a coffee run, Jack sees a severed hand glowing. He then hears the sound of the TARDIS materialising and departs. (Note: Continued in the 2007 Doctor Who episode "Utopia", which confirms the hand is a detector for the Doctor and used to be attached to the Doctor's body.) Gwen is perplexed at Jack's sudden departure, believing something has taken him.

== Reception ==
"End of Days" aired on 1 January 2007, alongside "Captain Jack Harkness". It received total viewing figures of 1.232 million, placing Torchwood number one on the top ten most viewed television series on multi-channel television the week it aired in the United Kingdom. The episode represented Torchwood in three BAFTA Cymru awards, including "Best Drama Series," Ben Foster for "Best Original Music Soundtrack," and Eve Myles for "Best Actress."

"End of Days" received mixed reviews from critics. Brigid Cherry of Total Sci Fi rated the episode 5 out of 10, describing the episode's gaps and dangling plot threads as "downright annoying," and felt preceding episode "Captain Jack Harkness" was more intriguing. Iain Clarke of Strange Horizons thought the episode "showcased every one of the show's worst excesses and precious few of its redeeming features," and that the episode was "heir to the myriad unresolved tensions and neuroses which the characters have exhibited over the course of the season." Paul Clarke of Outpost Gallifrey called the episode an "utter mess," thought Abaddon was less interesting than the Beast in Doctor Who's "The Satan Pit", but praised the episode for Murray Melvin's role as Bilis.
