= Random Shoes =

2006 Torchwood episode

09 – "Random Shoes"
- Torchwood episode

Cast
- Starring: John Barrowman – Captain Jack Harkness; Eve Myles – Gwen Cooper; Burn Gorman – Owen Harper; Naoko Mori – Toshiko Sato; Gareth David-Lloyd – Ianto Jones
- Others: Paul Chequer – Eugene; Luke Bromley – Young Eugene; Nicola Duffett – Bronwen Jones; Roger Ashton-Griffiths – Mr Garret; Steven Meo – Josh; Celyn Jones – Gary; Robyn Isaac – Linda; Gareth Potter – Shaun Jones; Joshua Hughes – Terry Jones; Amy Starling – Waitress; Leroy Liburd – Café owner; Ryan Chappell – Pete

Production
- Directed by: James Erskine
- Written by: Jacquetta May
- Script editor: Brian Minchin
- Produced by: Richard Stokes; Sophie Fante; Chris Chibnall (co-producer)
- Executive producer(s): Russell T Davies; Julie Gardner
- Music by: Ben Foster
- Production code: 1.9
- Series: Series 1
- Running time: 49 mins
- First broadcast: 10 December 2006

Chronology
← Preceded by "They Keep Killing Suzie"	Followed by → "Out of Time"

"Random Shoes" is the 9th episode of the first series of the English science-fiction television series Torchwood, first transmitted on BBC Three on 10 December 2006.

The episode follows former Cardiff WPC Gwen Cooper (Eve Myles), a recent recruit to Torchwood, exploring the seemingly mysterious death of Eugene Jones (Paul Chequer), who had previously attempted without success to contact the Torchwood Three team.

== Plot ==
Gwen investigates the death of an alien enthusiast called Eugene Jones in a hit-and-run accident, and is intrigued by photographs of random shoes that are on his mobile phone. Taking an incorporeal form, Eugene follows Gwen to find out how he died, as his memories slowly return.

In 1992, Eugene blanked on an inter-school maths competition, losing it for his school and disappointing his father, Shaun; Shaun left that same night, and Eugene and his brother Terry believed he found a new job in America. After receiving an eye that fell to Earth as a consolation prize, Eugene began collecting alien artefacts. He approached Torchwood several times but was always rebuffed.

After discovering Shaun worked at the local convenience store, Eugene decided to try to sell the eye on eBay in order to raise enough money to buy tickets to Australia for his co-worker, Linda. Eugene contacted the buyers and arranged to meet at the Happy Cook restaurant. Arriving there, he found that Gary, a co-worker, and Josh, a DVD store clerk, were the winning bidders. They had raised the price initially to get Eugene's hopes up, but, when the first large bid came in from a collector, they realised that, if they could get the eye, they could resell it for more. Eugene attempted to phone for a cab with his mobile phone, accidentally taking pictures of Gary, Josh and a waitress' shoes in the process, then swallowed the eye and fled the restaurant. He escaped from Gary and Josh, but unwittingly walked right into traffic, causing the accident that killed him.

In the present, Gwen uncovers the truth from Linda, Gary, Josh, and Eugene's mother Bronwen. Jack reveals to Gwen that the eye was probably a Dogon Sixth Eye, which allowed Eugene to gain a fresh perspective on his past life after he ingested it. Gwen calls Shaun and informs him of Eugene's death. Eugene's family and friends gather for his cremation, and Gwen recovers the eye from the ashes and travels to Eugene's wake with the rest of Torchwood. As she watches across the street, Eugene becomes corporeal, and pushes Gwen out of the way of oncoming traffic. Eugene knows he will not live much longer without the eye in his body. As his family watches in amazement at seeing Eugene, Gwen gives him a kiss for saving her life and for being real.

== Production ==
- This episode was originally titled "Invisible Eugene" up until two weeks before it aired. It was then changed to its present title. It was still listed as "Invisible Eugene" in the Radio Times and other television listings.
- Screenshots of Eugene's website as posted on the Torchwood Institute website suggest it to be hosted on the fictional Cheapserve webhost. Cheapserve has been used before by the Doctor Who production team.
- This story bears some structural similarities to the Doctor Who episode "Love & Monsters," in particular the heavy use of flashbacks and voice-overs by a guest character as narrative devices, as well as focusing on said guest character with minimal contribution by most of the regular cast.
- Producer Richard Stokes likened this episode to the 1946 comedy/drama film It's a Wonderful Life, in which the main character is afforded the chance to look back over his own life and reevaluate it, while remaining invisible to the other characters.
- Like "Love & Monsters," "Blink," "Midnight" and "Turn Left," this episode is a "double-banked" episode, meaning that it was filmed at the same time as another episode, in this case "Captain Jack Harkness." This explains why this episode focuses so heavily on Gwen out of the regular cast, while the rest of the cast appear only briefly. Conversely, Gwen appears little in "Captain Jack Harkness," which instead heavily features Jack and Tosh.
