= Reset (Torchwood) =

2008 Torchwood episode

19 – "Reset"
- Torchwood episode
- Owen examines the Mayfly that he extracted from the Pharm's hired killer.

Cast
- Starring: John Barrowman – Captain Jack Harkness; Eve Myles – Gwen Cooper; Burn Gorman – Owen Harper; Naoko Mori – Toshiko Sato; Gareth David-Lloyd – Ianto Jones; Freema Agyeman – Martha Jones
- Others: Alan Dale – Copley; Jacqueline Boatswain – Plummer; Jan Anderson – Marie; Rhodri Miles – Billy; Michael Sewell – Mike; John Samuel Worsey – Policeman; Paul Kasey (uncredited) – Weevil

Production
- Directed by: Ashley Way
- Written by: J.C. Wilsher
- Script editor: Brian Minchin
- Produced by: Richard Stokes; Chris Chibnall (co-producer)
- Executive producers: Russell T Davies; Julie Gardner
- Music by: Ben Foster
- Production code: 2.6
- Series: Series 2
- Running time: 50 mins
- First broadcast: 20 February 2008

Chronology
| ← Preceded by "Adam" | Followed by → "Dead Man Walking" |

"Reset" is the sixth episode of the second series of the British science fiction television series Torchwood, which was broadcast on BBC Two on 20 February 2008, with an initial airing on BBC Three on 13 February.

In the episode, the alien-hunting team Torchwood seeks to shut down a pharmaceutical company that is experimenting on live aliens to develop a drug that restores the human body to its "factory settings".

== Plot ==
=== Synopsis ===
Jack recruits UNIT medical specialist Martha Jones to assist Torchwood after a series of deaths of drug trial subjects from the secure medical facility called the Pharm, which Martha, and Torchwood's medic Owen, identify as murders. Further investigation shows that the murder victims have previously suffered from incurable diseases such as diabetes and HIV, but were cured of them prior to their deaths. One victim, Marie, still alive when Torchwood find her, dies while being questioned and fly-like creatures erupt from her mouth.

Jack detects a strong presence of alien life forms within the Pharm, and the facility's security system proves to be beyond the ability of Torchwood to hack from the outside. Martha offers to infiltrate the facility disguised as a human test subject and is accepted after claiming to be infected with hepatitis. Once inside, Martha discovers that the Pharm uses a substance called Reset that releases alien parasites called Mayflies into the host's body. The parasites cure the patient of any diseases and restore them to "factory settings", but at the price of infecting the patient with the parasite. When the eggs hatch, the creatures destroy the host. The director, Professor Aaron Copley, injects Martha with multiple doses of Reset, curious to determine the effect of Mayflies on her immune system, which has changed from travelling in time.

Martha compromises the Pharm's computer systems. Torchwood discover Billy, the assassin employed by the Pharm to dispose of research subjects, and realise he is about to kill the last living test subject. Ianto and Gwen apprehend Billy and return him to the Hub for questioning. Billy is infected with Mayflies, likely contracted from one of his previous victims, and Owen kills him by improperly using the singularity scalpel. The team rush to the Pharm hidden in Billy's vehicle, using his corpse in the driver's seat to fool the security guards into letting them inside the compound.

Within the Pharm, they find numerous aliens being used to produce various test substances, including the mature Mayfly that is the source of Reset. Owen successfully uses the singularity scalpel to neutralise the Mayfly within Martha. Jack orders Toshiko to shut down the Pharm, euthanising all of the trapped aliens with inert gases, and crashing all computer systems. Before the team depart, Copley kills Owen by shooting him in the chest and Jack responds by shooting and killing Copley.

== Production ==
- The song "Feel Good Inc." by Gorillaz plays as Martha and Owen study the Mayfly. Also, the song "Freakin' Out" by Graham Coxon plays in the information centre as Ianto lets Martha into the hub. Both songs were written by two different former members of Blur.

== Broadcast and reception ==
"Reset" was the first episode of the second series to have an advance broadcast on the digital channel BBC Three ahead of its terrestrial debut. The episode was first broadcast on BBC Three on 13 February 2008 at 9.50pm. It received its first terrestrial broadcast a week later, 20 February, at 9.00pm on BBC Two. A pre-watershed version of the episode was aired at 7.00pm 21 February 2008. According to consolidated figures the episode's BBC Three broadcast was watched by 850,000 viewers, its BBC Two debut by 3.22 million viewers and the pre-watershed version by 0.96 million viewers, amounting to an aggregated total of 5.03 million viewers across its three initial showings.

== Bibliography ==
- Walker, Stephen James (August 2008). "Part Six: Episode Guide-2.11: Adrift". Something in the Darkness: The Unofficial and Unauthorised Guide to "Torchwood" Series 2 (1st ed.). United Kingdom: Telos Publishing Ltd. pp. 208–215. ISBN 978-1-84583-024-3.
- Walker, Stephen James (August 2008). "Appendix D: Ratings and Rankings". Something in the Darkness: The Unofficial and Unauthorised Guide to "Torchwood" Series 2 (1st ed.). United Kingdom: Telos Publishing Ltd. pp. 269–274. ISBN 978-1-84583-024-3.
