= Catherine Tregenna =

Welsh writer

- Occupations: Actress; playwright; television screenwriter

Catherine Tregenna is a British playwright, television screenwriter and actress. She has written episodes for EastEnders, Casualty and for the first four series of ITV crime drama Law & Order: UK.

== Career ==
Tregenna began as an actress. She played the character Kirsty McGurk, for several years, in Pobol Y Cwm and a doctor in Satellite City.

In 2001, she wrote the comedy play Art and Guff. After, she transitioned back into television as a writer, co-writing the series Cowbois ac Injans and four episodes of the BBC's science fiction drama and Doctor Who spin-off Torchwood: "Out of Time", "Captain Jack Harkness", "Meat" and "Adam". As well as writing Meat, she also created the meat props shown in the episode. "Captain Jack Harkness" was nominated for the 2008 Hugo Award for Best Dramatic Presentation, Short Form.

She wrote The Woman Who Lived, an episode of the ninth series of Doctor Who which aired in October 2015. She contributed episodes to the third and final series of Stan Lee's Lucky Man, the third series of Riviera and the fifth episode of The Watch, which is inspired by the Ankh-Morpork City Watch from the Discworld series of fantasy novels by Terry Pratchett.
