= Out of Time (Torchwood) =

2006 Torchwood episode

10 – "Out of Time"
- Torchwood episode

Cast
- Starring: John Barrowman – Captain Jack Harkness; Eve Myles – Gwen Cooper; Burn Gorman – Owen Harper; Naoko Mori – Toshiko Sato; Gareth David-Lloyd – Ianto Jones
- Others: Kai Owen – Rhys Williams; Louise Delamere – Diane; Mark Lewis Jones – John Ellis; Olivia Hallinan – Emma; Sam Beazley – Alan Ellis; Marion Fenner – Nurse; Janine Carrington – Alesha; Rhea Bailey – Jade; Andrew MacBean – Flying instructor; Ciaran Dowd – Barman

Production
- Directed by: Alice Troughton
- Written by: Catherine Tregenna
- Script editor: Brian Minchin
- Produced by: Richard Stokes; Chris Chibnall (co-producer)
- Executive producers: Russell T Davies; Julie Gardner
- Music by: Ben Foster
- Production code: 1.10
- Series: Series 1
- Running time: 50 mins
- First broadcast: 17 December 2006

Chronology
← Preceded by "Random Shoes"	Followed by → "Combat"

"Out of Time" is the tenth episode of the first series of the British science fiction television series Torchwood, which was originally broadcast on the digital television channel BBC Three on 17 December 2006.

The episode involves the alien-hunting team Torchwood taking care of and trying to acclimatise a pilot and two passengers of an aircraft from 1953 who were brought forward to early 21st-century Cardiff.

== Plot ==
The vintage biplane airliner the Sky Gypsy passes through the Rift from 1953 to the present. Torchwood help the three people on board, pilot Diane Holmes and passengers Emma Louise Cowell and John Ellis, with room and board while assisting them in adapting to modern conveniences. The three travelers separate, pairing off with members of Torchwood.

Owen tries to help Diane to get flying lessons so she can pilot a modern aircraft, but finds that she will have to wait weeks to take them, but airplanes of today are largely flown via instruments and autopilot, much to Diane's disappointment as she does not believe it constitutes "real flying". Her biplane licence has also expired. After a romantic night with Owen, Diane secretly leaves to fly the Sky Gypsy off through the same pattern, hoping to fly through the Rift back to 1953, but if not to simply explore the world. Owen realises that their relationship is different than any he's had before; he actually loves her as a person, rather just being attracted to her sexually. When he wakes up, Owen warns her that she may end up anywhere, but she refuses to heed his advice before she flies off.

John finds that his son Alan is still alive but has Alzheimer's disease and is in a nursing home, with no children to help look after him. John becomes very remorseful at missing Alan's life and being unable to adapt to modern times. When Jack discovers that Ianto's car has gone missing, he believes John has taken it, and finds him in the garage of his old home ready to commit suicide by carbon monoxide poisoning. John asks Jack to help him end his life with dignity. Jack holds John's hand as they succumb to the fumes and die; Jack resurrects immediately afterwards.

Emma bonds with Gwen, and discovers that sex is much more promiscuous than in the 1950s. Gwen and her boyfriend Rhys help Emma to become more accustomed to modern romance, although Rhys' trust in Gwen is damaged when he learns that her story about Emma being a distant relative is false. Emma's skills as a "retro" fashion artist land her a job in London. Gwen tries to convince her to stay in Cardiff, but tearfully helps Emma off to a bus station to enjoy her new life.

== Continuity ==
- The Sky Gypsy is a de Havilland Dragon Rapide. It is identified as a de Havilland on the Torchwood Institute web site (where it is misnamed the Sea Gipsy).
- Diane's fate is not shown in the episode. A vision of her appears to Owen in "End of Days", begging him to be "brought back".
- When Jack is talking to John after his suicide attempt, he says that after you die, there is just black, partially echoing Suzie Costello in "They Keep Killing Suzie."
