= Helen Raynor =

Welsh screenwriter and editor

Helen Raynor (born March 1972) is a Welsh television screenwriter and script editor from Swansea. She is best known for her work on the relaunched BBC science fiction series Doctor Who. She previously worked as a theatre director. Besides television episodes, Raynor has written theatrical plays, radio plays, and short stories.

== Early life ==
Raynor was born in Swansea and attended Trinity Hall, Cambridge. Her initial career was in the theatre, where she worked for eight years as a director and assistant director for the Bush Theatre, the Royal Shakespeare Company, Clwyd Theatr Cymru, the Royal Opera House, English Touring Opera and Opera North. Her RSC Fringe production of Soho by Rebecca Lenkiewicz won a Fringe First at the 2000 Edinburgh Festival.

She also wrote Cake, a fifteen-minute television short for BBC One's Brief Encounters strand shown in May 2006, and for radio, a sixty-minute play Running Away with the Hairdresser for BBC Radio 4, broadcast in June 2005. For the theatre she has written Waterloo Exit Two, a short play presented as part of Paines Plough's Wild Lunch season at the Young Vic in 2003, and contributed to Cardiff based Dirty Protest's series of rehearsed readings.

== Career ==
Switching to television, from 2002 to 2004 she was a script editor on BBC One's daytime medical soap opera Doctors. Raynor's TV writing career would take off when she was working as a script editor on Doctor Who. In addition to her production duties for the show, Raynor wrote the two-part story "Daleks in Manhattan"/"Evolution of the Daleks" for the third series, in which the Daleks invade New York City in 1930. She was the first woman to write for the new series, as well as the first woman to write a Dalek story in Doctor Who's history. She then wrote another two-part story for series 4, entitled "The Sontaran Stratagem"/"The Poison Sky" in which the Doctor's old enemies the Sontarans, last seen in 1985's "The Two Doctors", make their re-imagined return. UNIT and Martha Jones also returned in these episodes. She also continued her script editing duties in the same series, working on the Steven Moffat two-part story "Silence in the Library"/"Forest of the Dead" and Russell T Davies' "Midnight".

Outside broadcasting, she has written for Doctor Who Magazine and compiled the script book of Doctor Who series 1 for BBC Books. She also provides an audio commentary for the Doctor Who episode "World War Three" in the 2005 season DVD boxset, released in November 2005. She later provided a second audio commentaries for the series 2 episode "School Reunion" and series three's "Daleks in Manhattan". Raynor also contributed the story "All of Beyond" to the Doctor Who short story collection Short Trips: Snapshots, published in June 2007. This was her first professionally published work of prose.

Raynor wrote two episodes for Torchwood, "Ghost Machine" for Series 1, and "To the Last Man" for Series 2. Both make extensive use of locations in the city of Cardiff where she lives.

Raynor, with her partner Gary Owen, co-created and wrote Baker Boys, a BBC Wales drama about a recession-hit small town in the south Wales Valleys. Baker Boys ran for two series in 2011/2012. Russell T. Davies acted as creative consultant, and the show starred Eve Myles, Matthew Gravelle, Mark Lewis Jones, Amy Morgan, Steven Meo, Boyd Clack and Cara Readle. In 2015 she was lead writer on ITV's period drama Mr Selfridge, starring Jeremy Piven, after joining the writers' room for series 3 in 2014. In 2020 she wrote an episode of Call the Midwife.
