= Cyberwoman =

2006 Torchwood episode

04 – "Cyberwoman"
- Torchwood episode
- The Cyberwoman

Cast
- Starring: John Barrowman – Captain Jack Harkness; Eve Myles – Gwen Cooper; Burn Gorman – Owen Harper; Naoko Mori – Toshiko Sato; Gareth David-Lloyd - Ianto Jones
- Others: Kai Owen – Rhys Williams; Caroline Chikezie – Lisa; Togo Igawa – Dr Tanizaki; Bethan Walker – Annie

Production
- Directed by: James Strong
- Written by: Chris Chibnall
- Script editor: Brian Minchin
- Produced by: Richard Stokes; Chris Chibnall (co-producer)
- Executive producers: Russell T Davies; Julie Gardner
- Music by: Murray Gold
- Production code: 1.4
- Series: Series 1
- Running time: 50 mins
- First broadcast: 5 November 2006

Chronology
← Preceded by "Ghost Machine"	Followed by → "Small Worlds"

"Cyberwoman" is the fourth episode of the first series of the British science fiction television series Torchwood. Written by Chris Chibnall and directed by James Strong, the episode was first broadcast on the digital channel BBC Three on 5 November 2006, and later repeated on terrestrial channel BBC Two on 8 November.

In the episode, Lisa Hallett (Caroline Chikezie), a half-converted Cyberman, attacks the base of the alien hunters Torchwood after secretly being housed there by her boyfriend Ianto Jones to make her fully human again.

The episode was among the first pitched for the series, as creator Russell T Davies saw a potential to continue the story from the Doctor Who episodes "Army of Ghosts" and "Doomsday". Chibnall originally intended the episode to appear sometime midway through the series, but was ultimately brought forward to the fourth slot. It was filmed in the third production block. Because of the limited number of filming locations and cast members, it was among the cheapest episodes in the first series. It was seen by almost 1.4 million viewers after its original broadcast and received generally mixed reactions from critics, though the producers regard the episode as one of their favourites in the series.

== Plot ==
Ianto and his girlfriend Lisa both worked for Torchwood in London when Cybermen partially converted Lisa during their battle at Canary Wharf. (Note: As depicted in the 2006 Doctor Who episode "Doomsday".) Ianto has since cared for Lisa by placing her in the basement of the Torchwood Hub in Cardiff with a conversion unit to keep her alive. Secretly inviting cybernetics expert Dr Tanizaki to the basement, Ianto wants Tanizaki to reverse the process. Tanizaki is able to make Lisa breathe on her own again, but by that time, Torchwood is called back to deal with a rogue UFO. When Tanizaki brings Lisa back down to the basement, her Cyberman influence takes over and she kills him by attempting to upgrade him, causing the power to flicker.

Ianto discovers Tanizaki's body and attempts to hide it. Meanwhile, Lisa drains even more power by re-entering the conversion unit. Believing the Hub is under attack, Jack sends Gwen and Owen to the basement where they find the abandoned conversion unit. Jack runs down to find Owen is lying unconscious and Gwen is about to be converted. He stops the process and attempts to shoot Lisa, but Ianto stops him, allowing Lisa to escape. Jack tells Ianto that there is no cure.

Ianto approaches Lisa to reason with her, only to end up being knocked unconscious. Jack buys Toshiko time to go to the surface to recharge the emergency power cells by allowing himself to be electrocuted twice by Lisa, though he survives due to his immortality. To allow the rest of the team to escape, Jack sprays Lisa with a special "barbecue sauce" that summons the pet pterodactyl; as it attacks her, the team escape by the invisible lift. Ianto punches Jack for his actions, uttering he is "the biggest monster of them all." Meanwhile, a pizza delivery girl unwittingly enters the Hub and Lisa implants her brain into the delivery girl. Ianto runs back to the Hub, but is stopped by Jack, who threatens him at gunpoint with an ultimatum; either he will execute Lisa, or if he does not do so in ten minutes, Jack will enter and kill them both. Ianto returns to the basement where he is reluctant to shoot Lisa. Lisa promises to Ianto that they can be upgraded together. The rest of Torchwood, arriving to hear that, open fire and kill her, leaving Ianto to mourn.

== Production ==
=== Background ===
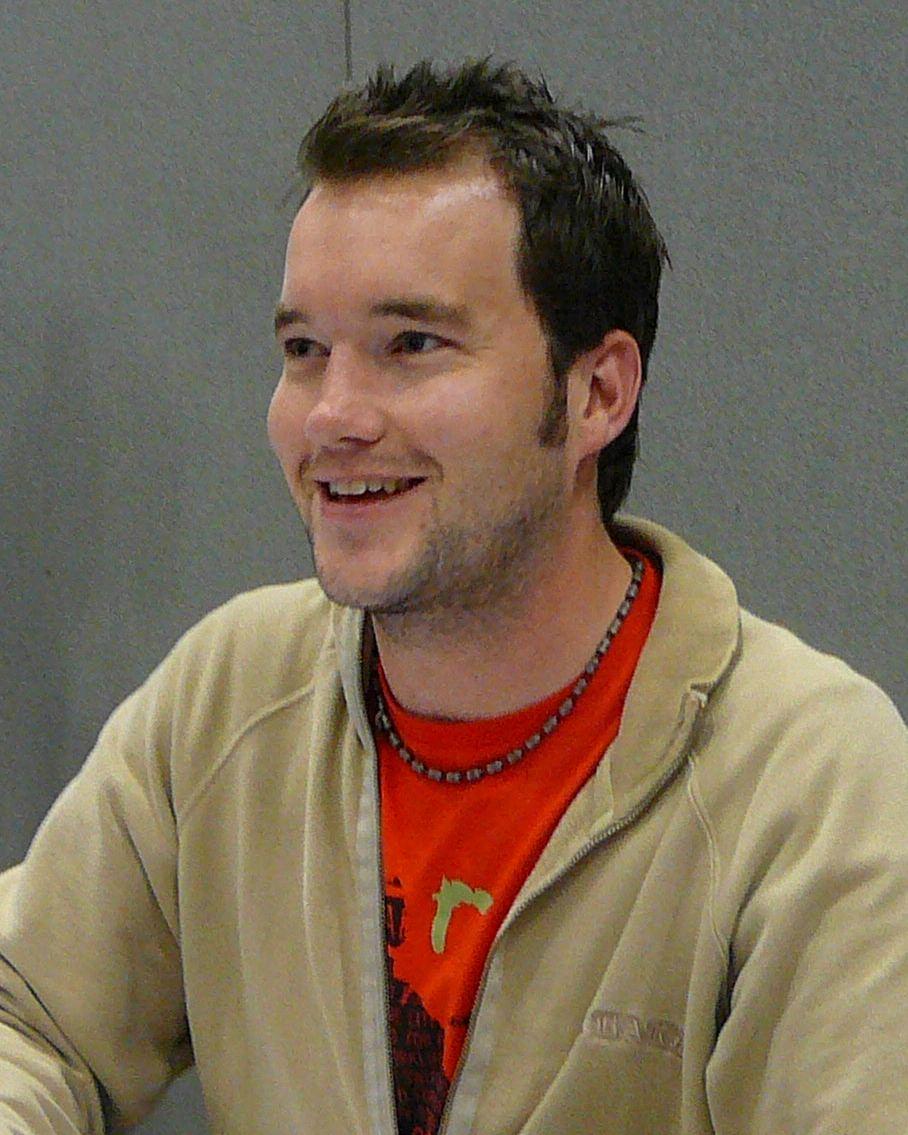
"Cyberwoman" was the first episode to centre on Ianto Jones, portrayed by Gareth David-Lloyd (pictured).

The idea behind the episode came from series creator Russell T Davies, who realised there was a story "begging to be told" after the Doctor Who episodes "Army of Ghosts" and "Doomsday"; in the episodes, Cybermen from a parallel universe invade Earth to assimilate the human population. They were ultimately defeated when the Doctor (David Tennant) banishes them to the void, a space between universes, to be imprisoned. "Cyberwoman" was among the first episodes pitched for the first series. When Chris Chibnall was appointed head writer for Torchwood, Davies asked him to write an episode about a cyber girl in the basement of the Hub.

Out of the entire first series, "Cyberwoman" is the biggest nod to Doctor Who, there was little to no mention of the series, despite being a spin-off, which was made deliberate to send out "confusing signals" to the audience about what the series is. Chibnall wanted to include a base description of what a Cyberman is for any viewer who had not seen Doctor Who. The episode was the first to centre on Ianto, who in the first three episodes was more or less a background character, and what John Barrowman described as like Torchwood's version of Alfred Pennyworth in Batman. Chibnall originally intended for the episode to become the sixth or seventh in the series, but was brought forward to the fourth because some of the other scripts were not yet completed. It also became one of Chibnall's harder episodes to write. Before settling on the current title, Chibnall went through numerous working titles, including "The Trouble with Lisa" and "The Long Night of Ianto". "Cyberwoman" was ultimately chosen because the title "says it all."

=== Writing ===
In writing the beginning, Chibnall envisaged Ianto meeting Tanizaki at an airport and then escorting him to a hotel before entering the Hub, however that was cut from the final draft as it would be an expensive sequence to film. Chibnall wanted the episode to take place several weeks after the previous episode, "Ghost Machine", as to show Gwen knowing all the protocols and how to handle weapons, where as in the last episode, Gwen was still considered a rookie. Despite the episode being about stopping Lisa, Chibnall still wanted the beginning to be a love story between her and Ianto, and show the audience that a half-converted Lisa is still human and the girlfriend Ianto loves. Also, because Ianto is "fundamentally wrong" about thinking Lisa can be saved, Chibnall wanted the audience to sympathise with the character and his motives.

The idea of having Lisa fight the pterodactyl, named Myfanwy by the producers, made them laugh, and felt they had to include it. The line where Ianto calls Jack the "biggest monster" was intended to be cut out, but Chibnall decided to keep it because of its impact to the audience. The scene where the team lines up to execute Lisa towards the end was the first scene Chibnall had in mind for the episode, though in the first draft, it was Ianto who killed her. After the episode was written and filmed, Chibnall discovered two main plot holes in the story. The first is that he did not make clear that everything about Lisa, including the scene where she acted human was all part of her plan for her Cyberman-influence to take over, and reflected to adding at least two lines of dialogue to explain her motives clearly. The second was Jack having a cut lip in the end, even though he is immortal and all his wounds would have healed quickly. In the audio commentary for the episode, both Chibnall and actor Gareth David-Lloyd stated the reasoning behind the cut being there is because Jack's immortal powers would only deal with life-threatening wounds and not minor injuries.

=== Filming ===
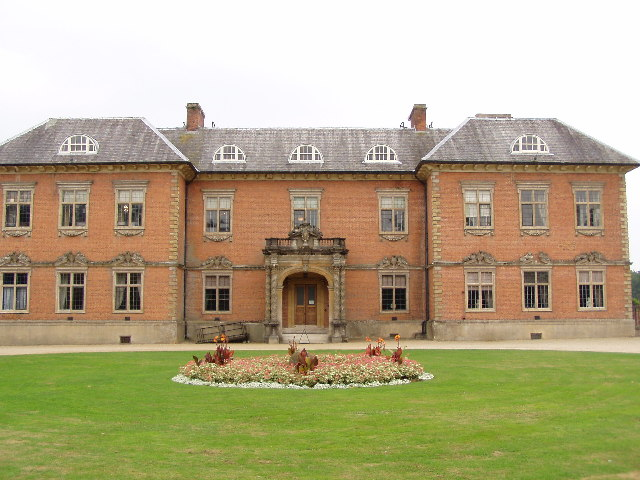
The basement where Ianto held Lisa was filmed at a cellar in Tredegar House.

Before filming took place, David-Lloyd met with Caroline Chikezie and got to know each other to help give their respective characters their chemistry. The episode was filmed as part of the third production block of the first series, along with eighth episode "They Keep Killing Suzie". Director James Strong wanted to film the episode in a sort of real time format. Filming largely took place at the Upper Boat Studios outside Pontypridd, where the Torchwood Hub set is located. The scene where Jack threatens to kill Ianto if he does not kill Lisa was the first scene to be shot. The flashback scene where Ianto finds a half-converted Lisa in Canary Wharf took a full day to film; it was originally supposed to take only a few hours, but the camera failed to record the scene. It was replaced, but the second camera failed to record also. Eve Myles and Burn Gorman were both trained how to handle guns and a torch like a "secret agent." Strong noted that they both held the gun and torch in each hand like professionals.

The external shots of the Hub were filmed at Roald Dahl Plass in Cardiff, which is what exists above the Hub in the series. Filming the scenes at the Plass took place during the middle of the night, and was disrupted by hooligans. The basement where Ianto holds Lisa was filmed at a cellar in Tredegar House, Newport. The original ending to the episode is where Toshiko hands Ianto coffee while he is cleaning the Hub. However, after it was filmed, Strong decided to cut that scene out, as he felt the overhead shot of the Hub before that scene would have made a more suitable ending. Because it was filmed in only a handful of locations, mostly in the Hub set, and there were only a few guest cast members, "Cyberwoman" was considered one of the cheapest episodes in the first series.

=== Costume and effects ===
The producers noted there were a history of "sexy, pneumatic, hydraulic women" in science fiction, and wanted to "tap into that." To make the cyberwoman costume, the props department wanted to make it as "sexy" as they can. Director James Strong wanted to make the costume look "amazing," but threatening and scary as well. There were discussions about which parts of Lisa would be human, and which parts would be cyborg. Made out of rubber, it was custom made to fit Chikezie as much as possible. It took an entire day for the actress to get her body cast. After the costume was completed, it would take an hour to apply each morning, and an hour to remove by lunch break. Chikezie found it difficult to hear anything from the helmet while shooting scenes. It was also uncomfortable for her, but the producers noted she remained stoic throughout filming.

The fight scene between Lisa and Myfanwy was difficult to shoot, as the actress had to interact with a visual effect creature that would not be added until post-production. The producers added a plastic green beak stuck on the end of a stick to be used as a guide. The scene where the team go up on the invisible lift was made by making the platform stationary, but the camera below it would descend, giving the illusion the platform is ascending. The visual effect of the tools used to create Cybermen were reused from the Doctor Who episode "The Age of Steel", while the UFO footage when the Torchwood team return from the drinks was a tin foil-covered frisbee on a fishing line.

== Broadcast, reception and analysis ==
=== Ratings and critical reception ===
"Cyberwoman" was first broadcast on BBC Three during the 10 pm time slot on Sunday 5 November 2006. The episode was seen by 1.391 million viewers, the highest viewing on the channel the week it was broadcast. The repeat on terrestrial channel BBC Two on 8 November 2006, was seen by 2.1 million viewers with a 10% audience share. It was given an Appreciation Index of 84.

Daniel Montesinos-Donaghy of Den of Geek reacted positively towards the episode, stating "surprisingly, it was absolutely brilliant – a mini-tragedy of sorts about secrets, obsession and corruption that finally gave both Gareth David-Lloyd something interesting to do and the series some much-needed focus. Plus, they totally played a Mogwai song! How often does that happen on television?" Montesinos-Donaghy felt it was "a step in the right direction," adding that it has "everything I could have wanted from a Torchwood episode."

Ian Hyland of News of the World disliked the episode, stating "After this week's 'Cyberwoman' nonsense, 'Torch Script' would be a better idea." Androzani.com said of the episode, "It's awful. It's horrific. It seriously, seriously sucks," adding "the single nice thing we can find to say is that the concept had potential." Seb Patrick of Noise to Signal thought, "despite a strong - and somewhat morally ambiguous - ending [the episode] really should have delivered in more spectacular fashion than this." Patrick also criticised Jack's personality throughout the episode, stating "we wanted a spinoff series about him because he was cocky, cool and downright entertaining - Buzz Lightyear meets Ace Rimmer meets James Bond. We didn't want some grumpy immortal bastard with a chip on his shoulder." Despite the mixed reviews however, the series producers and BBC controller of fiction Jane Tranter regard the episode as one of their favourites from the first series.

=== Critical analysis ===
In an essay on evolving symbolism with the Cybermen, Lincoln Geraghty of the University of Portsmouth argues that in "Cyberwoman", "we see the first female Cyber character on screen; unable to control her programming she attempts to assimilate her ex-boyfriend and his teammates. Like Maria in Metropolis and the suburban threat seen in The Stepford Wives (1975), technology is seen here as even more threatening when linked with the possibility of female reproduction."

It is never explained why the Cyberwoman looks the way she does. As a partly converted human, the half-finished costume should resemble previous established Cybermen, which it does not as, most notably, this costume has breasts despite a previous media showing that male and female humans become identical non-gendered Cybermen.

The character of Ianto Jones is shown to be distraught over the situation with his girlfriend and yet, within just a few episodes, he has forgotten her and started a relationship with Jack Harkness.

Neil Perryman of the University of Sunderland feels this episode is a prime example of transmedia storytelling in Doctor Who and Torchwood, describing the episode and ancillary online material released after its airing being in part an attempt at continuity management. He describes "...these metasites have also been used to correct continuity errors that have appeared within the television show. For example, following the broadcast of the Torchwood episode 'Cyberwoman' (13 November 2006), the official Torchwood website provided information about 'The Fall of Torchwood One' that attempted to correct – via 'additive comprehension' – what some fans had regarded as a glaring error in the plot. Fans had asked how the eponymous Cyberwoman was not sucked into the void along with the rest of her kin during the climax to the Doctor Who episode 'Doomsday' (8 July 2006) and the site retroactively explained away the problem: 'The only exceptions were those being converted with material entirely derived from this side of the void', which allowed the events of 'Cyberwoman' to take place without contradicting what viewers originally saw in the episode."
