= Kiss Kiss, Bang Bang (Torchwood) =

2008 Torchwood episode

14 – "Kiss Kiss, Bang Bang"
- Torchwood episode
- The hologram of Captain John's ex-lover tells him that the diamond he was searching for was a ruse to avenge her murder.

Cast
- Starring: John Barrowman – Captain Jack Harkness; Eve Myles – Gwen Cooper; Burn Gorman – Owen Harper; Naoko Mori – Toshiko Sato; Gareth David-Lloyd – Ianto Jones
- Others: Kai Owen – Rhys Williams; James Marsters – Captain John Hart; Menna Trussler – Old Woman; Paul Kasey – Blowfish; Crispin Layfield – Mugger; Nathan Ryan – Victim; Inika Leigh Wright – Hologram Woman; Sarah Whyte – Teenage Girl

Production
- Directed by: Ashley Way
- Written by: Chris Chibnall
- Script editor: Brian Minchin
- Produced by: Richard Stokes; Chris Chibnall (co-producer)
- Executive producers: Russell T Davies; Julie Gardner
- Music by: Murray Gold; Ben Foster
- Production code: 2.1
- Series: Series 2
- Running time: 50 mins
- First broadcast: 16 January 2008

Chronology
← Preceded by "End of Days"	Followed by → "Sleeper"

"Kiss Kiss, Bang Bang" is the first episode of the second series of British science fiction television series Torchwood, which was broadcast on BBC Two on 16 January 2008.

The episode features a guest appearance from James Marsters as Captain John Hart, the former colleague and lover of the alien hunter Jack Harkness (John Barrowman). In the episode, John double crosses Jack's Torchwood team as part of a plan to steal a diamond from a woman who was murdered.

Chris Chibnall wrote the episode with the knowledge that Marsters wished to appear in the series, and wrote the part of John Hart "absolutely" for him. The episode was filmed in Cardiff in July 2007. "Kiss Kiss, Bang Bang" was seen by four million viewers upon its original broadcast, with an Appreciation Index of 84, and was met with generally positive reviews in both the United Kingdom and United States.

== Plot ==
Jack, after finding the Doctor (Note: As depicted in "End of Days" and the 2007 Doctor Who episode "Utopia".) and witnessing the end of the world, (Note: As depicted in the 2007 Doctor Who episodes "The Sound of Drums" and "Last of the Time Lords".) returns to his Torchwood team, and shoots an intoxicated alien Blowfish involved in a hostage situation.

During a murder investigation at a multi-storey car park where Rift activity has been detected on the corpse, Jack receives a surprise call on his vortex manipulator from the murderer: Jack's former lover, the Time Agent Captain John Hart. Jack joins him at a nightclub to catch up with him, and John accompanies Torchwood to the Hub. He tricks Torchwood into finding three cylindrical devices which he claims are dangerous bombs that need defusing. He believes they will triangulate the location of a diamond he stole off a different former lover.

Torchwood split into three groups. Gwen and John search the docks. John paralyses Gwen and locks her in a crate, telling her that if she is not found in two hours, her main organs will stop working and she will die. Toshiko and Owen search a warehouse. John shoots Owen in the hip. Jack and Ianto search an office block. John pushes Jack off the roof when Jack realises the bombs are a confidence trick. John then takes a pyramid-shaped object from the Blowfish in the Hub's morgue. Gwen is saved by the team, while Jack survives the fall due to his immortality.

Torchwood confront John, who discovers there is no diamond; John's former lover anticipated dying, and thus set a trap to kill her murderer. The device turns out to be a bomb which attaches itself to the murderer of the bomb's owner, which is John, and begins a ten-minute countdown.

Unwilling to die, John handcuffs himself to Gwen and swallows the key in order to force Torchwood to remove the bomb. Gwen formulates a plan to use the Rift at the car park to contain the explosion, but at the penalty of her own life. Jack and Owen catch John and the rest of the team at the car park where John arrived and inject him with the team's DNA, thus confusing the device into detaching from John. Jack throws the bomb into the Rift where it detonates. John then regurgitates his key to free Gwen and agrees to leave. Before leaving, John tells Jack that he found Gray.

== Production ==
=== Writing and filming ===
The development of the episode commenced when executive producer Russell T Davies received an email from his agent, telling him James Marsters was interested in appearing on the series. Chris Chibnall wrote the episode "absolutely" for Marsters, and wanted Hart to become a conflict for Jack Harkness. Marsters believed that Hart was somewhat of a doppelganger to Harkness. After scripting was complete, Marsters did not need to discuss with the directors because he felt the script was self-explanatory.

Originally, Captain John was going to come through the Rift on a "pandimensional surfboard" similar to the one found in the Doctor Who episode "Boom Town", Chibnall changed it because the production team decided that "it would look cooler if John just calmly walked out of the Rift, as if it was the sort of thing he might do every day".

The episode was filmed in Cardiff in July 2007. The first meeting between Jack and John at the nightclub was written to be akin to a Spaghetti Western. Instead of fighting, it was decided that they would kiss first, so that the audience "don't see it coming". The following fight scene was intended to be "sexy, rather than brutal", similar to the naked wrestling scene in the film Women in Love. While the scene only lasted one minute on screen, much more was filmed, so much that it took a whole day to shoot. 80% of the acting in the scene was done by Marsters and Barrowman themselves, instead of stuntmen. The style of fighting was similar to what Marsters was used to, and was, according to stunt co-ordinator Tom Lucy, a cross between Western, martial arts, and Bourne.

The building used to film searching for one of the canisters was a British Gas building in Cardiff. The scene with Jack falling off the building was performed by Curtis Rivers, John Barrowman's stunt double. Though Rivers made the stunt to make Jack "look good", Barrowman had to lie on a box over green screen. Marsters and Barrowman were used for filming close to the roof's edge.

=== Visual effects and animatronics ===
While the most noticeable visual effect was John's entrance through the Rift, The Mill also made inconspicuous visual effects, such as extending the number of crates at the docks. The visual effect used for the Rift was redesigned for the second series, due to a decision among the visual effects team at The Mill that separate manifestations of the Rift appear different — in this case, orange and gold was used to make the Rift appear "warmer and more magical". The Mill also made three different types of holograms. The projection from Jack's wriststrap device was coloured blue to match earlier appearances, John's wriststrap projected a flashier, full colour image due to specifications in the script, and the golden hue in the projection of John's ex-lover was based on the prop.

The blowfish in the opening scene was intended by executive producer Russell T Davies to be "like Finding Nemo, but evil" and the producer of the episode, Richard Stokes, wanted the designs to be as flamboyant as "the lionfish in The Spy Who Loved Me". The first designs of the costume were visibly different from the final design; the first designs were more fish-like than humanoid. After a humanoid design was approved by the production team, Millennium FX, who previously created the prosthetics for Doctor Who and the first series of Torchwood, immediately sculpted the costume to Paul Kasey's dimensions. Two versions of the mask were created; one was animatronic, which included mechanical fins, and one was used for the stunt where the blowfish was shot in the head. A Blowfish would later appear in the episode "Fragments," and later appeared in the Doctor Who episodes "The Pandorica Opens" and "Nightmare in Silver."

== Broadcast and reception ==
=== Ratings and later broadcast ===
After its original broadcast, an edited version of the episode was shown the following week on BBC Two. The episode was also aired ten days later on BBC America.

=== Critical reception ===
Metro picked "Kiss Kiss, Bang Bang" as their pick of the day on 16 January 2008, complimenting the "fast-paced plot" in contrast to the "puerile humour" and "[meandering] between soft porn and Scooby-Doo" of the first series. In the same newspaper, on the following day, Keith Watson commented that the episode "was like watching Carry On Up the Asteroids", but nevertheless stated that "as dramatic cocktails go, [its mix of gadgets, sci-fi gobbledegook and louche libidos] was out of this world", and gave the episode four stars out of five. The Times commented that the episode was "good, salacious, knockabout fun", the best thing about Torchwood that "everyday Cardiff hums alongside psychotic blowfish and time loops", and asked "when extraterrestrial push comes to intergalactic shove, how could anyone object to a series that begins with a blowfish driving a sports car?". The Guardian stated that parts were "very, very, funny" and the episode was largely "a hoot". However, The Daily Telegraph felt that the series fared better on BBC Three, but on BBC Two it was "both far too pleased with itself and surprisingly amateurish".

The episode also received positive reviews in the United States. The Chicago Sun-Times summarised it as "gay and playful sci-fi fun" and compared it with Buffy the Vampire Slayer's "good and efficient wit", and theorised that its rising quality made it "not hard to imagine it could be must-watch TV by season four", the Orlando Sentinel stated it was "a bracing mix of campy comedy, chilling twists and sexual surprises" and commented that it "enlivens Saturdays", and the Sci Fi Channel, who syndicate Doctor Who, called the script "excellent", commented that "Marsters and Barrowman's chemistry is just terrific", and lamented that the show only airs thirteen episodes per series, as opposed to the American standard of 24.
