= Brian Kelly (director) =

British television director

Brian Kelly is a British television director. He has worked on several high-profile British television drama series, including Sea of Souls, Taggart, Monarch of the Glen, Holby City, Downton Abbey and The Watch. In 2006, he took charge of directing the first block of episodes of the Doctor Who spinoff series Torchwood. In 2014 he directed several episodes of the STARZ drama Outlander.
