= Everything Changes (Torchwood) =

2006 Torchwood episode

01 – "Everything Changes"
- Torchwood episode

Cast
- Starring: John Barrowman – Captain Jack Harkness; Eve Myles – Gwen Cooper; Burn Gorman – Owen Harper; Naoko Mori – Toshiko Sato; Indira Varma – Suzie Costello; Gareth David-Lloyd - Ianto Jones
- Others: Kai Owen – Rhys Williams; Guy Lewis – Young cop; Tom Price – P.C. Andy; Jason May – SOCO; Rhys Swinburn – Body; Olwen Medi – Yvonne; Gwyn Vaughan-Jones – D.I. Jacobs; Dion Davies – Officer; Jâms Thomas – Hospital porter; Paul Kasey – Weevil; Mark Heal – Security Guard; Gary Sheppeard – Pizza lad; Gwilym Havard Davies – Man; Cathryn Davies – Woman

Production
- Directed by: Brian Kelly
- Written by: Russell T Davies
- Script editor: Brian Minchin
- Produced by: Richard Stokes; Chris Chibnall (co-producer)
- Executive producers: Russell T Davies; Julie Gardner
- Music by: Murray Gold
- Production code: 1.1
- Series: Series 1
- Running time: 50 mins
- First broadcast: 22 October 2006

Chronology
| ← Preceded by — | Followed by → "Day One" |

"Everything Changes" is the first episode of the British science fiction television programme Torchwood, which was first broadcast on the digital channel BBC Three on 22 October 2006. The story was written by show creator and executive producer Russell T Davies as an introduction to the show's mythos. The episode re-introduces Captain Jack Harkness, who had proved popular in the first series of the 2005 revival of Doctor Who, as the leader of Torchwood, a team of alien hunters.

The story is told from the perspective of Gwen Cooper (Eve Myles), who comes across the Torchwood team through her job as a police officer with the South Wales Police, who are investigating a series of strange deaths in Cardiff. Through Gwen's discovery of Torchwood, the audience are introduced to team members Owen Harper (Burn Gorman), Toshiko Sato (Naoko Mori) and Ianto Jones (Gareth David-Lloyd). Suzie Costello, as played by Indira Varma, had also been billed as a series regular prior to transmission, though in a twist the character was revealed as the murderer and killed off at the end of the episode, with Gwen replacing her as a member of the Torchwood team.

Upon broadcast the episode earned BBC Three its highest ever viewing figures. Critical reaction to the episode was mixed, with reviewers making both positive and negative comparisons to Torchwood's parent show Doctor Who.

== Plot ==
During a murder investigation in Cardiff, police officer Gwen Cooper spies on a group of five people called Torchwood, led by Captain Jack Harkness, exiting an SUV. One member, Suzie, uses a metal gauntlet to temporarily bring the victim to life and talk to him. Gwen flees when Jack notices her. The next day, Gwen runs into Jack again at a hospital and, following him, finds a sealed-off area where Jack catches a Weevil.

As she escapes, Gwen follows the Torchwood SUV to Roald Dahl Plass, where she loses sight of them. Discovering a local pizza store makes regular deliveries to Torchwood, Gwen disguises herself as a pizza delivery girl. Monitoring her actions, Torchwood willingly let her into their underground hub. Jack shows Gwen around the hub, including the captured Weevil from the hospital. They then leave the hub via a pavement slab lift, which takes them to Roald Dahl Plass in front of the Millennium Centre; the slab makes anyone standing on it unnoticed to passersby.

Over drinks, Jack explains that Torchwood is one of several branches, including Torchwood One which was destroyed at Canary Wharf. (Note: As depicted in the 2006 Doctor Who episode "Doomsday". In the 2007 Doctor Who episode "The Sound of Drums", Jack confirms that he changed the old Torchwood regime that was destroyed at Canary Wharf.) They catch "tons" of aliens and scavenge alien technology that are washed up through a rift in space and time that runs through Cardiff, while preventing others from obtaining them. Jack places an amnesia pill in Gwen's drink, leaving her with no memory of the meeting.

The next day at work, Gwen is shown a drawing of the murder weapon, which triggers a series of memories. These solidify when she spots a Millennium Centre programme with the word "Remember" in her own handwriting at home. Outside the Millennium Centre, Suzie explains she killed the man Gwen saw resurrected to test the gauntlet. Suzie pulls a gun on Gwen as she is the only one that can link Suzie to the murder weapon. Jack rises from the pavement lift, and Suzie turns and shoots him in the head. Jack then comes back to life. With no chance of escape, Suzie shoots herself in the head. Gwen now remembers everything.

The gauntlet is sealed away. Standing on the roof of the Millennium Centre, Jack tells Gwen that he died once, but was brought back to life, (Note: As depicted in the 2005 Doctor Who episode "The Parting of the Ways".) and that he can never die. He agrees with Gwen that perhaps Torchwood can do more to help people, and offers her a job, which she accepts.

== Production ==
This episode had the working title of "Flotsam And Jetsam". This title was worked into the script when Jack describes the idea of "flotsam and jetsam" falling through the Rift into Cardiff. The opening scene, involving the reanimation of a corpse in an alley at night, was adapted from a pitch written by Russell T Davies and Julie Gardner for a possible science fiction series called Excalibur, devised before Davies became responsible for the 2005 revival of Doctor Who. In "Kiss Kiss Bang Bang" Captain John Hart jokes about the name Torchwood and says it should have been named Excalibur. The BBC Three premiere on 22 October 2006 aired Everything Changes back-to-back with the second episode, "Day One", in a 100-minute premiere special; the closing credits of both episodes were combined to air at the end. The Weevils, who were introduced in this episode, went on to recur in both Torchwood and Doctor Who.

== Broadcast ==
In the unofficial overnight viewing figures, "Everything Changes" gained an average audience of 2.4 million for its debut showing on BBC Three, a 12.7% share of the total television audience for its slot. This was the largest audience ever recorded by a BBC Three programme, as well as the highest ever audience for a programme broadcast solely on a digital television platform that was not either a United States import or a live football match. The figure also placed "Everything Changes" third in its time slot across all channels, beaten only by the analogue channels ITV1 and Channel 4 with Prime Suspect and The League of Extraordinary Gentlemen respectively.

When "Everything Changes" was repeated on analogue channel BBC Two three days after its BBC Three airing, it won an audience of 2.8 million, a 13% share. This again placed the episode third in its timeslot, behind Who Do You Think You Are? on BBC One and the thriller Bon Voyage on ITV1.

=== Reviews and reception ===
The website of The Stage entertainment industry newspaper gave "Everything Changes" a positive preview in its coverage following the 18 October press screening of the episode. "The first episode is an economical, by the numbers introduction to the team", wrote reviewer Mark Wright. "It's certainly bold, the cast are very pretty and the dialogue has a zippy archness to it. Whether that will become grating after a few episodes remains to be seen, but if you like your sci-fi drama a bit punchier than the whimsical Doctor Who, touch wood, you should find a lot to enjoy in the adventures of Torchwood."

Previewing the episode for the Radio Times listing magazine, Mark Braxton was impressed, but felt that the series would offer better episodes later in the run. "It's slick, scary, funny and expensive looking, but it's also very much an establishing episode", Braxton commented. "With the guided tour dispensed with, however, the fun can really begin."

The Guardian newspaper's television reviewer Sam Wollaston also gave the episode a guarded welcome, although he felt that the attempts to make Cardiff appear glamorous were a failure. "They've done their best to sex the place up—lots of helicopter shots of that posh bit where Charlotte Church lives, but it still looks like Cardiff, to be honest. No matter—most of the interesting things are going on below the ground... It's not yet clear whether Eve Myles as new Torchwood recruit PC Gwen Cooper can fill Billie Piper's boots. Surely not—those boots are two gaping weekend voids that no one can fill. But this looks promising: it's slick, quick and a tiny bit scary. Not much humour yet, which was the lovely thing about Doctor Who. But it's early days; don't jump quite yet."

The Sunday Times Culture magazine mentioned Torchwood as one of the week's highlights and added that it was "arguably better than Who". Less positively, the Scotsman when reviewing the episode said "Torchwood seems to me to be as nonsensical and full of holes and unexciting as the genre always is." The use of the alien perfume on the young woman and her boyfriend by Owen has drawn criticism of the character online, with some viewers pointing out this is similar to date rape.
