= Richard Stokes (producer) =

British television producer

Richard Stokes is a British television producer and executive producer. In 2003, he was interviewed for the post of producer on the then in pre-production revival of Doctor Who, but ultimately lost out on the job to Phil Collinson.

== Career ==
He worked on Eastenders as a script editor towards the end of the 1990s and the early 2000s. After, he worked on Holby City as series producer (until 2005) and executive producer (2005–2006). He produced the first two series of the Doctor Who spin-off series Torchwood for the BBC.

He was the producer and occasional writer of ITV's Law & Order: UK from series 1 to series 6, working with Chris Chibnall. He would go on to produce the legal drama Silk and another Chibnall production, crime drama Broadchurch. In 2016, he produced Undercover for the BBC. He serves as an executive producer on Silent Witness and The Watch. He will oversee an adaptation of Runestaff for BBC.
