= Captain John Hart (Torchwood) =

Fictional character of Torchwood

- Torchwood character
- First appearance: "Kiss Kiss, Bang Bang"
- Last appearance: "Exit Wounds"
- Portrayed by: James Marsters

In-universe information
- Affiliation: Time Agency
- Home era: 51st century (originally)

Captain John Hart, played by James Marsters, is a fictional character from the BBC science fiction television programme Torchwood. He is introduced in the episode "Kiss Kiss, Bang Bang"—the first episode of Torchwood's second series. Whilst the character has not featured subsequently to the second series finale, he went on to appear in a Torchwood Magazine comic strip and Marsters has stated his interest in reprising the role on more than one occasion.

In his first appearance, John Hart is a rogue Time Agent and former partner of the series' lead male character Jack Harkness (John Barrowman) both professionally and sexually. Whilst the original function of the Time Agency—stated to have ceased operation by the time Hart appears —is left unspecified, John's own backstory is briefly given: as well as having had a relationship with Jack, he has been in rehab for an addiction to alcohol, drugs, sex and murder. John leaves Earth disgraced after his initial self-interested plot is foiled by Harkness' Torchwood team, though returns in the series finale "Exit Wounds" where he is eventually given a chance to redeem himself.

The role of John Hart in Torchwood was written with the casting of Marsters in mind after he contacted the shows' producers expressing his interest in appearing in the programme's parent show, Doctor Who. The character is used to illuminate some of Jack's own characteristics as a doppelgänger who provides both an exaggerated version of, and a parallel to, aspects of Jack's persona. Both Marsters and the general media also compared aspects of Hart's character to Marsters's role as Spike in Buffy the Vampire Slayer and Angel. Whilst a few reviewers criticised the character in relation to his impact of the show's tone, a larger number welcomed the character and the energy Marsters brought to the role.

== Appearances ==
=== Television ===
Captain John Hart appears through the Cardiff space-time Rift using a vortex manipulator and asks Jack Harkness for help in locating three radioactive cluster bombs, apparently scattered across Cardiff. Jack Harkness tells his team that John cannot be trusted but agrees to help him. True to Jack's word, Captain John is lying and seizes the containers, trying to kill Gwen Cooper (Eve Myles) using a paralyzing lip gloss, shooting Owen Harper (Burn Gorman), punching Toshiko Sato (Naoko Mori) and pushing Jack off the top of a building, thinking he's dead. However the containers, which are supposed to contain the location of a valuable diamond hidden by the lover he murdered, instead contain an explosive which latches on the DNA signature of her killer. As insurance against Torchwood leaving him to die, John handcuffs himself to Gwen and swallows the key. After superficially altering his DNA using that of the Torchwood staff, Jack and Owen are able to save John's life before banishing him. Spurned by his former lover, John leaves by means of his Vortex Manipulator.

In "Fragments", Captain John returned in holographic form, stating that he is going to destroy Jack's life, revealing a holographic image of his lost brother Gray. Continuing in "Exit Wounds", Captain John is revealed to have rescued Jack's brother Gray from a group of sadistic captors, only to learn too late that Gray had been driven insane through being tortured over the years. Molecularly bonding a bomb to John's wrist to force him to obey his orders, Gray had John set off multiple bombs throughout Cardiff before taking Jack back in time to 27AD, where Jack is buried alive at the site that would become Cardiff in the future. However, John betrays Gray by leaving a tracking device on Jack in the shape of a ring, thus allowing Jack to be recovered by the Torchwood Institute and frozen in the morgue, escaping at the right moment to stop his brother. Having frozen Gray in cryopreservation, unwilling to witness any more death that day, Jack offers to help pinpoint another Rift event to allow John to leave, but John instead states his desire to travel Earth, commenting that he'd like to learn what Jack finds so fascinating about the planet.

An image of John Hart is briefly seen in the 2014 Doctor Who episode "Time Heist", as part of a montage of the galaxy's most notorious criminals.

=== Literature ===
The character has a prominent role in the Torchwood magazine comic strip "Shrouded" set between Torchwood's third television series, subtitled Children of Earth, and fourth series Miracle Day and written by Gareth David-Lloyd who portrayed Ianto Jones in the first three series of Torchwood. John Hart is seen to have observed Ianto's funeral from a distance before later settling in Mexico, earning a living by buying and selling alien artefacts washed up from a rift similar to the one in Cardiff. A past version of Ianto is then contacted by a malevolent time-travelling seductress seeking to use the knowledge of his death to alter time for her own gain. As Jack has left Earth and Gwen has a newborn child, John is required to team up with Gwen's husband Rhys Williams in order to restore the original timeline.

Captain Hart is also briefly mentioned in an audiobook, In the Shadows, where he is a part of Jack's 'hell'. He is said to have taken over Torchwood 3 and started a relationship with Ianto Jones (Gareth David-Lloyd).

=== Audio ===
Marsters reprised his role as John Hart in the audio drama "The Death of Captain Jack" from Big Finish's Torchwood range, alongside John Barrowman as Captain Jack in March 2018, and "Torchwood: The Sins of Captain John" in January 2020.

He further returned to play John Hart in the audio drama "Dark Gallifrey: The War Master" from Big Finish's Dark Gallifrey Range, alongside Derek Jacobi and Lisa Bowerman and appears in "Part 2" & "Part 3" in August and September 2024 respectively.

== Development ==
=== Casting and concept ===
Head writer Chris Chibnall had originally conceived the idea of a "rogue Time Agent" character during the production of Torchwood series 1, but the idea never made it to TV screens. After watching episodes of executive producer Russell T Davies' revival of Torchwood's parent series Doctor Who, Marsters and his agent got in touch with Davies about appearing in the series. Davies vetoed the idea, but suggested that Marsters be part of Torchwood's second series instead. After Marsters expressed interest in Torchwood, Chibnall and Davies felt that he would be perfect for the role of the Time Agent character. Chibnall immediately produced the script for "Kiss Kiss, Bang Bang", which introduced the character. He sent it off to Marsters "and essentially got agreement straight away". Marsters accepted the role on the basis of a "really good script" and "a really fun character" stating that as an actor he is attracted to "playing people who are evil, don't care, and have no guilt." In an interview published to the BBC Online news website in July 2007, Marsters indicated that he was "really" excited about his character, who he revealed would be "naughty" and "a bit of a psychopath."

=== Characterisation ===
The character shares many similarities with Marsters's Buffy the Vampire Slayer and Angel character, Spike, with Marsters commenting "In a lot of ways, this role is very much like Spike was in my first three episodes of Buffy." The Torchwood writers conceived John as a classical nemesis for Captain Jack, with Chibnall commenting, "In seeing John you see the way Jack could have gone, and probably did, for a little while." James Marsters further discussed ways in which John is a doppelgänger or foil to Captain Jack: both are pansexual time travellers, with their key difference being that John never reformed. The character exaggerates many of Jack's qualities, for example displaying zoophilic attraction to non-humanoids such as poodles, in addition to men and women. John and Jack's intentional similarities extend to their penchant for period war clothing:

He's got a jacket from fighting in the Napoleonic Wars; he's got a snakeskin sword from Korea that I think he had to kill someone for; his boots are from Italy circa 1640 and he's got gun holsters from the American West."

— James Marsters, RadioTimes Interview (January 2008)

Teasing John's role in "Exit Wounds" Marsters stated that he's someone "who's in way over his head and doesn't even know it yet" and that "things do change" in regards to his character. Chibnall, Marsters and producer Richard Stokes discuss the role of "Exit Wounds" in developing John's character and placing him on a redemptive path. Marsters felt the character to be on a "journey" whilst Chibnall deliberately played upon the question of "can you trust him, or can't you?" Stokes commented that the character isn't the "selfish and anarchic" character seen in "Kiss Kiss Bang Bang" and that his "affection and love for Captain Jack are enough to make him try and do the noble thing". Stephen James Walker, a writer of reference works on Doctor Who and its spin-offs, notes that because of the reluctance of Hart's collaboration with Gray and his remorse for his actions the episode leaves the audience "a little more favourably disposed" towards the character. In April 2008 Marsters indicated that he expected to return to Torchwood in the near future. He later expressed a desire to be part of Torchwood's fourth series after it was revealed the show would be largely produced in Los Angeles.

== Reception ==
Reviewing the episode "Kiss Kiss Bang Bang" for The Daily Telegraph James Walton was sceptical about the fact that "some of the fawning [over Captain Jack] even came from the main baddie" and what he felt to be the indication that the character was "thrown into the mix on the principle that one glamorous space-travelling bisexual isn’t enough." Whilst The Daily Mirror's Jane Simon expected that the physical contact between Marsters and Barrowman would result in "somebody's sci-fi fantasy" being realised she saw it dashing her "hopes series two might serve less sex, less rubbish aliens and more credible drama". However, Dan Martin of The Guardian described the character as the "best thing about the opener" and stated that "he stole every scene he was in". He felt the production team "shamelessly and brilliantly.... transplanted" the character of Spike into the series. Richard Edwards of SFX magazine also gave particular praise to Marsters portrayal and like Martin, stated that he "steals the show". Ben Rawson-Jones of Digital Spy felt Hart's arrival to be "self-consciously iconic" in providing "swagger, innuendo and a wonderful Star Wars reference". He felt that overall the characterisation verged "dangerously close to parody at times" but this didn't detract from Marsters being "a joy to watch, in a similar vein to his role in Buffy." Charlie Jane Anders commented in regards to the episode that ""Spike" is pretty great in his Adam Ant jacket, with his paralyzing lip gloss and his zany sexual innuendo". IGN felt John to be a "lot of fun" and a "good character to add to the mix" who showed the team "just how much of a mess they are".

In regards to "Exit Wounds" Anders felt that the "campy" John "felt like he didn't quite belong in such a serious episode". Conversely, Mark Wright of The Stage opined that the character was "rather better second time round". SFX's Edwards felt the character to be "not as fun" as in episode one but observed that his "heroic side makes for a more rounded character" and anticipated a return in future. IGN's Travis Fickett felt Hart to be "a far more interesting adversary" than Jack's brother Gray and once he had been unmasked as a "red herring" the episode "has some life taken out of it". Subsequent to his last appearance, the character has continued to be mentioned in relation to Torchwood. In June 2010—following the announcement of a fourth series to be produced as an American co-production—Dan Martin felt that James Marsters would be the "obvious first box to tick" in regards to new cast members for the programme. In March 2012, John Hart made SFX magazine's reader voted list of the 100 sexiest male characters in the history of film and television science fiction and fantasy. He ranked #82.
