= Ianto Jones =

Fictional character in Torchwood

- Torchwood character
- First appearance: "Everything Changes" (2006)
- Last appearance: Children of Earth: "Day Four" (2009)
- Portrayed by: Gareth David-Lloyd
- Shared universe appearances: Doctor Who (2008)

In-universe information
- Affiliation: Torchwood Institute
- Origin: Cardiff, Wales
- Home era: Early 21st century

Ianto Jones is a fictional character in the BBC television programme Torchwood, a spin-off from the long-running series Doctor Who, played by Welsh actor Gareth David-Lloyd. A regular within the show, Ianto appears in every episode of the programme's first three series excluding the finale of series 3, as well as two crossover episodes of Torchwood's parent show, Doctor Who. Additionally, Ianto appears in Expanded Universe material such as the Torchwood novels and audiobooks, comic books and radio plays. Within the narrative of the series, Ianto begins as general support officer for Torchwood Three, a team of alien hunters stationed in Cardiff, and develops into an active field agent. Initially the regular character with the least screen time, Ianto's role expanded in response to growing cult appeal.

Reserved and efficient, Ianto was often used by writers to add humorous asides to the episodes' scripts. The character becomes the main romantic interest of Captain Jack Harkness (John Barrowman), who is the lead male of the series. Established to have had heterosexual relationships prior to the series, Ianto's story forms a part of the show's ongoing exploration of human sexuality. Expanded Universe material develops on Ianto's sexual orientation and the nature of the relationship with Jack, describing Ianto as bisexual and his feelings for Jack as genuine love. Additionally, writers have used these other media to explore Ianto's characterisation; for example, some stories elaborate on Ianto's backstory, or provide insight into his feelings.

Beginning as a casual relationship, with little on-screen definition given, Ianto and Jack's relationship deepened over the first three seasons of the programme. The character's creator Russell T Davies chose to kill off Ianto in the third television series. Professional critics by and large gave the story extremely positive reviews. A number of fans, however, were upset by the death of the character, particularly with regard to the romantic storyline's abrupt ending. Artistically, Davies felt that the relationship's unexplored potential maximised the viewer's sense of grief. Subsequent to the departure, fans created a shrine and set up websites in the character's honour, petitioning the writers to resurrect him in future episodes of the series and raising money for charity. Torchwood writers and actors have expressed an unwillingness to reduce the weight of the death scene by bringing the character back, though David-Lloyd penned a Torchwood comic book wherein an alternative universe Ianto survives.

== Depictions ==
=== Television ===
The character of Ianto Jones is introduced in the first episode of Torchwood, in 2006. Introduced as a mild-mannered and quiet administrator working for Torchwood Three, the first episode to focus on him was "Cyberwoman", which dealt with both his backstory and motivations. In the episode, Ianto is revealed as a former employee of Torchwood One in London (first seen in parent series Doctor Who), whose girlfriend Lisa (Caroline Chikezie) has been partially converted into a Cyberman, a cyborg species seen repeatedly in Doctor Who. Ianto has been keeping her alive, concealed in the basement of the Hub, but she eventually breaks loose and kills two civilians. Ianto is forced into confrontation with team leader Captain Jack Harkness (John Barrowman), who is later able to revive Ianto with a kiss when Lisa knocks him unconscious. Ultimately, the rest of Ianto's team is forced to kill Lisa. Although Ianto's thoughts continue to be concerned with Lisa, mid-series he begins to develop a sexual relationship with Jack. By the penultimate episode of the series, Ianto is willing to shoot colleague Owen Harper (Burn Gorman) to protect Jack, and refutes claims he is merely his "part time shag". In the series finale, an image of what appears to be Lisa's ghost is used to bring Ianto to mutiny against Jack, but still later when Jack (who cannot stay dead) returns to life, he and Ianto immediately kiss one another.

Torchwood's second series (2008) begins with the team working without Jack, who departed the Hub at the end of series one to reunite with the mysterious "Doctor" from his past. Ianto's role within the team now more frequently includes field missions to accommodate Jack's absence. When Jack returns in the series two premiere, having seen the end of the world, he attempts to formalise his romantic relationship with Ianto, successfully asking him on a date. Jack and Ianto's relationship becomes more overt, and Ianto's character becomes less burdened by secrets and happier, beginning to express a newfound confidence and dour sense of humour. The penultimate episode of the series, "Fragments" explores Ianto's backstory, specifically how he was recruited into Torchwood Three two years prior; Ianto is persistent that Jack hire him after the destruction of Torchwood One, but only succeeds once he is able to aid Jack in capturing a stray pterodactyl. In the second series finale, Ianto and the team face Jack's 51st-century ex Captain John Hart (James Marsters) and younger brother Gray (Lachlan Nieboer), who has vengefully sought to destroy Jack's world. After Gray kills his teammates Toshiko (Naoko Mori) and Owen, the Torchwood team is left with a membership of only three. Following from this, Ianto makes his first crossover appearance in Doctor Who alongside Gwen (Eve Myles) and Jack in the two-part finale of the 2008 series, where Torchwood is called on to help contact series protagonist the Doctor (David Tennant) during a Dalek invasion. He was also mentioned in the alternate universe created in the Doctor Who episode "Turn Left" when Rose Tyler (Billie Piper) mentioned that he and Gwen were killed in the attempt to stop the Sontarans' invasion of Earth with ATMOs devices, whilst Jack is imprisoned in the Sontaran homeworld.

Torchwood's third series (2009) is a five-part miniseries broadcast over one week, called Children of Earth. In part one, Ianto starts to express insecurity to Jack about their status as a couple. The audience is introduced to Ianto's sister Rhiannon (Katy Wix) and brother-in-law Johnny Davies (Rhodri Lewis), who confront Ianto about sightings of him on a date with Jack. Ianto eventually admits to being involved with Jack but concedes that he is not sure where he stands. When aliens called the 456 return to Earth, John Frobisher (Peter Capaldi) puts a hit on Torchwood's lives to cover a conspiracy. In part two, Ianto and Gwen survive a Hub explosion that obliterates Jack. Once regenerated, Jack is sealed in cement by agent Johnson (Liz May Brice) until Ianto rescues him with a forklift truck. In part three, the group watch helplessly as the 456 demand a tribute: 10% of the Earth's children; the government appears willing to comply. In part four, Ianto and Jack storm Thames House to confront the 456. The pair refuse to sacrifice any lives to the alien demands. In response, the aliens release a fatal virus into the atmosphere. Thames House locks down, and Ianto dies in Jack's arms, telling him that he loved him and begging Jack never to forget about him, to which Jack replies he never could.

=== Literature ===
Ianto appears in the first six of the Torchwood novels, published by BBC Books. The first wave, Another Life by Peter Anghelides, Border Princes by Dan Abnett, and Slow Decay by Andy Lane, were published in January 2007. Published in March 2008, and tying in with the concurrently airing second series of Torchwood, Ianto appears in the novels Trace Memory by David Llewellyn, The Twilight Streets by Gary Russell, and Something in the Water by Trevor Baxendale. October 2008 saw the release of three more Torchwood books by Peter Anghelides, series writer Phil Ford and writer for the Doctor Who and Torchwood websites, James Goss, the latter's cover for Almost Perfect reflecting changes to the cast after the episode 2008 finale episode "Exit Wounds". The character next appears in Into the Silence, Bay of the Dead and The House that Jack Built in June 2009, and Risk Assessment, The Undertaker's Gift and the short story anthology Consequences in October of that year.

First published in January 2008, the monthly Torchwood Magazine began occasionally including Torchwood comic strips, in which Ianto also appears. In 2010, Shrouded is one such two-part comic, written by Gareth David-Lloyd. The comic posits a "what-if" scenario wherein Ianto, "who struggles with his feelings for Jack from the offset", sees a face from the future and embarks on a mission that could change the course of his life (from that of his eventual death in Children of Earth). David Lloyd comments that he "knows [the] character implicitly". In the first part, Ianto (originating from the timeframe of Season Two) is approached by Rhys and Captain John, both post-Children of Earth, who warn Ianto not to believe the offer made by a seductive, time-travelling woman; they do not tell him that their mission is to preserve the timeline in which he dies. In part two, the woman, Mairwyn, informs Ianto of the events of "Exit Wounds" and Children of Earth, and of Jack's departure. Ianto tearfully watches the scene where Jack learns of Gwen's engagement and sleeps with Mairwyn. After learning of the devastating consequences of assisting Mairwyn, he defeats her and later "retcons" himself. However, in a divergent timeline, Ianto appears with Mairwyn, observing his funeral, saying, "I can't believe there's a reality where I said no." In 2010, "Shrouded" was republished in Titan's dedicated Torchwood comic book.

During series two, the Torchwood website, www.torchwood.org.uk, also hosted an interactive online game written by series writer Phil Ford. Updated weekly with the airing of the new episodes, the website features specially shot footage with Gareth David-Lloyd in character as Ianto debriefing and informing the 'player' with regard to their mission. Throughout both series one and two, the interactive websites co-written by James Goss featured electronic literature content (such as fictitious internet messaging conversations and letters) which depict aspects of Ianto and the other Torchwood characters' work and personal lives. The Torchwood Archives by Gary Russell collects much of this online literature in hardback form, along with new original material, some of which expands on what we know of Ianto. For example, it introduces his sister, Rhiannon and brother-in-law Johnny; Rhiannon and Johnny later appear in 2009's third televised series.

[Being bisexual is] the worst of any world because you don't really belong anywhere, because you are never sure of yourself or those around you. You can't trust in anyone, their motives, or their intentions. And because of that, you have, in a world that likes its nice shiny labels, no true identity.

— Ianto in The Twilight Streets by Gary Russell (p.126),
Torchwood literature further explores Ianto's characterisation.

Spin-off media has tried to fill in the gaps of Ianto's character history from before he began working at Torchwood Three; Ianto's first week at Torchwood One is shown in a flashback in the novel Trace Memory. The segment also depicts his budding relationship with Lisa Hallett. Also expanding on Jones's time living in London, the comic The Legacy of Torchwood One! (Torchwood #1) shows how Ianto was taken under the wing of Rupert Howarth, a senior researcher, during his first few weeks at Torchwood One. Ianto's characterisation is explored in The Twilight Streets, in which Ianto sheds some light on the difficulty he had "coming out" as a teenager; Ianto's mother tried to have a conversation with him about it, but he remarks "She didn't work me out, Gwen. No one has. And if I ever do, I'll let you know." He then engages in a diatribe with Gwen about what it means to him to be bisexual after Gwen jokes to him that he has the "best of both worlds". A scene in David-Lloyd's "Shrouded", in which Ianto is emailing his sister, Owen is seen to wrestle control of the computer and tries to write to her that "I've recently discovered that I'm a Big Old Gay"; Ianto rebukes him. In the storyline's conclusion, an alternate timeline is created where Ianto did not die in the events of Children of Earth.

However, as with all Doctor Who and Torchwood spin-off media, the canonicity in relation to the television series is unclear.

=== Audio drama ===
Ianto also appears in Torchwood audio books, the first two being Hidden written by Steven Savile and narrated by Naoko Mori, Everyone Says Hello written by Dan Abnett and narrated by Burn Gorman, released February 2008, and In the Shadows by Joseph Lidster, released in September 2008. Joseph Lidster also wrote a BBC Radio 4 Torchwood drama, "Lost Souls" which aired in Summer 2008 as an Afternoon Play featuring the voices of John Barrowman, Eve Myles, Gareth David-Lloyd and Freema Agyeman (Martha). Set after the events of the 2008 series, Ianto and the team make their first international adventure to CERN in Geneva, as part of Radio 4's special celebration of the Large Hadron Collider being switched on. The special radio episode's plot focuses on the Large Hadron Collider's activation and the doomsday scenario some predicted it might incite, as well as the team's mourning of Toshiko and Owen's recent deaths.

But let's be honest, Jack. I'm... nothing more than a blip in time for you, Jack. Every day, I grow a little older. But you're immortal. You've already lived a thousand lifetimes. How could you watch me grow old and die? How can I watch you live and never age a day?

— From Ianto's monologue in "The Dead Line" by Phil Ford,
Torchwood audio dramas further explores Ianto's characterisation.

Three further BBC radio dramas were produced in 2009 for the Afternoon Play slot on Radio 4, each of which feature Ianto Jones. Chronologically, these occur between the second and third televised series but after "Lost Souls". Transmitted in July 2009, the first drama is "Asylum", the second is "Golden Age", and the third is "The Dead Line". "The Dead Line" in particular, focuses on Ianto's characterisation, particularly with respect to his relationship with Jack. AfterElton reviewers stated that the radio drama "delivers for Janto [a portmanteau used by the shipping fandom] fans"; David-Lloyd delivers a monologue as Ianto, verbalising his insecurities to a comatose Jack. When Jack awakens from his coma, he promises, "You will never be just a blip in time, Ianto Jones."

After his character was written out of the televised series, David-Lloyd still lends his voice 2011 audio drama series The Lost Files, tying into the televised fourth series, Torchwood: Miracle Day. Of these, "The House of the Dead" by James Goss focuses the most on Ianto. Ianto encounters the spirit of his father, with the claim that he, Ianto's mother, Owen, Toshiko, and Lisa will all be resurrected if Ianto betrays Jack. Exploiting its radio format, the drama reveals that Ianto is dead, but has been recreated through time by an ancient being called Syriath in order to tempt Jack to allow the Rift to remain open so she can escape, revealing that the story is actually a Jack solo mission set after series three. Jack and Ianto say a final goodbye and tell each other they love one another for the first time. Syriath's plan works and Jack attempts to return to the land of the living alongside Ianto, but Ianto stays behind to close the Cardiff Rift forever with Jack's device.

David-Lloyd has reprised the role of Ianto for various Torchwood audio dramas with Big Finish Productions, beginning with 2015's Fall to Earth, in stories taking place prior to Ianto's death.

== Characterisation ==
=== Conception ===
Gareth David-Lloyd has revealed that his character was originally named Idris Hopper. This has led to speculation that he was the same Idris Hopper played by Aled Pedrick who appeared in the 2005 Doctor Who episode "Boom Town" as Margaret Blaine's (Annette Badland) personal assistant. Writer Stephen James Walker wonders if Russell T Davies intended Idris to become a major character on Torchwood in the same way as Toshiko Sato, who originated in Doctor Who's "Aliens of London". Idris Hopper has since appeared in Gary Russell's Torchwood novel The Twilight Streets. Initially, Ianto is introduced as a quiet worker and the least active character in the supporting cast. David-Lloyd started the role believing Ianto would be killed off at the end of the first series, and was surprised when they "worked the character to become more popular, and it started growing from there."

When Gareth David-Lloyd was cast in the role, the character was renamed Ianto Jones. This was inspired by the character of Yanto Jones, also played by David-Lloyd, in Russell T Davies's 2004 comedy-drama Mine All Mine. Ianto shares the surname "Jones" with Doctor Who characters Martha Jones and family as well as Harriet Jones, Torchwood character Eugene Jones ("Random Shoes"), and Stuart Allen Jones in Davies's earlier Queer as Folk; Davies states that reusing names (such as Tyler, Smith, Harper, Harkness and Jones) allows him to get a grip of the character on the blank page. In developing the character's attire, costume designer Ray Holman comments: "Ianto has a very distinct look but his suits actually vary quite a lot. He started off with some nice but boring Marks and Spencers suits in series one, which were top-end fitted ones but always very sober. Towards the end of series one, I also got him into a waistcoat, and everyone thought that looked really good.

=== Development ===
In Series One, Ianto was much more into himself, so the one-liners were few and far between. By Series Two, he'd got no secrets, his personality came out, and I think the writers enjoyed giving him lines that other characters couldn't get away with.

— Gareth David-Lloyd on Ianto's development.

On how he views the character, David-Lloyd says that "outwardly, he's straight-laced, but there's a darker side to him and a very playful side too." Initially, in series one, Ianto is a quiet and more reserved character. Throughout the first series, Ianto's secrets are exposed to the team, particularly in "Cyberwoman" when his motives for joining Torchwood Three are exposed. David-Lloyd was "bowled over" by the Ianto-centric script for "Cyberwoman" and the "wide range of emotions" it allowed him to play. From this point, Ianto's focus changes and he begins more and more to come out of his shell.

Appearing in series two, Ianto assists the team in field missions and is used by the writers as a vehicle for one-liner jokes. Commenting on this, portrayer Gareth David-Lloyd notes that "This season it's much more relaxed and he's not all about keeping secrets, he's about Torchwood and Jack — he's found his meaning and his place so his dry humour comes out a lot more and he's happier." The developments in Ianto's character were also reflected in the wardrobe choice. "For series two," comments Ray Holman, "we evolved the look quite a lot, and now his suits come from all over the place. It's just a question of where I see something that looks right for Gareth, so I've brought him a suit from Savile Row and suits from Zara and Next. We realised we could be a bit more flash with Ianto now he's come out of the background and started to assert himself a bit more. So we moved him into coloured shirts and snazzier ties. He started off in white and grey shirts but we realised his skin tones can take the extra colour and now he's evolving into something much sharper, which looks really good filmed in high definition."

In Torchwood Magazine, actor Gareth David-Lloyd comments on some original character developments intended for Ianto. Originally, his character was the one supposed to die at the end of series two episode "Reset". Davies's plan had originally intended for Ianto to be revived, as Owen eventually was, in episode seven. From this point on, the character was intended to be "the Living Dead — pale, but still sexy". The night before filming, however, Davies changed his mind and seven scripts began a process of being rewritten. New lines had to be handed to the actors on the day of filming. Davies also called a discussion with the actors involved to explain the change in the storyline. In the discussion with executive producer Russell T Davies and Burn Gorman, who portrays Owen, it was decided that Owen would experience the zombification storyline as he is a character who more overtly enjoys life, making it more interesting from a narrative perspective.

David-Lloyd described the character's development in the third series as "really exciting". He felt that it was "great to be a fully-fledged member of the team now rather than just the administration man." He felt flattered to have the writer and producers put so much confidence in him. In this series, the writers also explore Jones's background; David-Lloyd was happy with the execution of this backstory, through meeting Ianto's sister, and commented that it was quite beautifully written. Through meeting his family, we discover that his father has died and that Ianto has grown very distant from his relatives as per the demands of his job. David-Lloyd first concluded that Ianto was being killed off when his agent told him he was only needed for four out of five episodes. Although there was "a bit of disappointment", he considers himself "lucky" for lasting so long on the series, especially since Ianto was supposed to die in series two. He believed the character's death was justified by "the impact and the drama, and to keep the dangerous reality of Torchwood ever present". Although it was "a tragedy that [Ianto] died", David-Lloyd felt that the series had "addressed everything about him that needed to be said".

Creator Russell T Davies felt that killing off Ianto was necessary for Children of Earth; it was his first decision to create a "horrible war casualty" for the story, because it would be unrealistic to have a great threat and have the main characters all come out unscathed. Ianto's death also precedes the death of Captain Jack's grandson Steven (Bear McCausland), and for that scene to occur it necessitated making Jack "badly, badly damaged". Ianto's death caused "maximum damage" to Jack, and the loss of his lover (and grandson) makes Children of Earth a tale of retribution, as Jack had given away twelve children to the same aliens in 1965. Davies has said that Ianto is "absolutely dead". He explains his reasoning; because it's a "much more real world in Torchwood", it wouldn't work to "regenerate or go to a parallel universe." Davies feels that Barrowman and David-Lloyd would both be dismayed were that to happen. He stated "it would devalue the entire plot if we brought him back". Wired magazine described Ianto's arc, ending in the third series, as an "evolution from meek office assistant to heroic warrior".

=== Relationship with Jack ===
Much of Ianto's character development is centred on the character's relationship with Captain Jack. On the character's evolution from minor character to romantic interest, Gareth David-Lloyd has commented that "To have a storyline where you're involved with the leading character for any actor is awesome." On the character's development, David-Lloyd has said that through Jack's relationship, "he's found his meaning and ... he's happier." Asked what it is that Ianto receives from Jack, David-Lloyd responds "Support, meaning. I think he lost meaning. He was tortured and Jack gave him that meaning back. And reliability that he'll always be there, I think." John Barrowman and Gareth David-Lloyd have also opined that Jack's relationship with Ianto has however brought out Jack's empathy, and helped to ground him, with John Barrowman reported as saying that Ianto "brings out the 'human' in him, it brings out more of the empathy because he's actually fallen for someone and he really cares about somebody. So, it's really great and I think that's what makes him warm to other people. It makes him more approachable." In the same interview, Gareth David-Lloyd said of the relationship and his character that "I think Ianto's always made him care and that is really the heart of the show. Ianto's always bearing his emotional side and vulnerable side and keeping his feet on the ground. I think of all the characters, he's the one who tries to keep everyone else's feet on the ground. He brings everyone back to reality, often with a dry, witty remark or taking a dig at somebody just to sort of bring people back down."

Comparing Jack's relationship with Ianto to his romantic tension with Gwen, David-Lloyd states "I think [there are] different sorts of love or lust, as it might be, and I think that's an ongoing thing ... At the moment, I think there's two different sorts of love going on there." He also states that he feels that Ianto's relationship with Jack is his first same-sex relationship, and doesn't feel that Ianto would be a "labelist", but were he, he would identify as bisexual, but that he "wouldn't regard himself the same way as Jack does because they're from different times." Author Stephen James Walker feels sorry for Ianto, perceiving his relationship with Jack as a one-sided one. To him, Ianto views the relationship as "serious and committed", as seen in "A Day in the Death" where he tells Owen that it is not just about sex. However, from dialogue in "Something Borrowed", Walker believes that Jack appears to equate his relationship with Ianto to nothing more than a "recreational activity". Walker also notes how important it was for Ianto when he cut in to dance with Jack, as this is the first time that his relationship with Jack is presented before the rest of the crew. The novel The House that Jack Built includes a scene where Gwen tries to clarify whether Ianto understands the nature of his relationship with Jack, saying "You do know he's ...", which Ianto finishes "Just a shag?" before adding "Yes I know. I can't help it, though. I've never been much good at casual." In radio play "The Dead Line", set just prior to series three, Ianto expounds his insecurities to Jack, who refutes them, confirming that his feelings for Ianto are real. When asked if the relationship will continue in series three, executive producer Julie Gardner replied, "Yes, I like seeing them as a couple", while director Euros Lyn stated that "the love story between Captain Jack and Ianto [would continue] to unfold" in the third series. While Gareth David-Lloyd feels that the love story between Jack and Ianto was not fully resolved, which is "part of the tragedy", the character and his relationship with Jack had been sufficiently explored in the third series for David-Lloyd to be "happy to walk away from it."

Ianto makes a post-death appearance in 2011 audio drama "The House of the Dead". Encountering Ianto's spirit at a haunted location in Wales, Jack and Ianto are permitted a final goodbye. Without Ianto in his life, Jack wishes to be swept up into the Rift as it closes in an attempt at suicide. Ianto tricks Jack into leaving the House of the Dead, however, despite the possibility of resurrection. As they are forced to part forever by the closing of the Rift, the couple declare their love for one another for the first and last time.

== Reception ==
=== Critical reception ===
Awarding the character of Ianto the status of "Cult Spy Icon", British entertainment news website Digital Spy describes him as a "cult legend", citing his dour demeanour, one-liners and "eye candy" label. Gay men's website AfterElton placed Ianto as their seventh best gay and bisexual character in modern science fiction (encompassing television, film and comic books), with Torchwood's Jack, Ianto's love interest, receiving first place. Wired magazine was impressed with the way Ianto's romantic storyline was handled in the third series, and praised Davies's writing for the "deft, sympathetic handling" of the Harkness-Jones romance, compared with the "clumsiness" of the show's homoerotic overtones in previous series. Because Ianto's storyline grows out of the reality of the show, "it plays with such genuine sympathy and pathos that Jones's eventual fate is easily the miniseries' most powerful moment." Wired describes David-Lloyd's performance as Jones as "a key element in the success of the five-episode story arc." One AfterElton contributor disliked the death scene partially for the loss of a "beloved gay character", and because Ianto's death was caused by Jack's stupidity, goading on the aliens. They compared the death scene to that of Tara (Amber Benson) in Joss Whedon's Buffy the Vampire Slayer which he felt was more satisfying, although "unbearably sad" because of its pivotal role in the character arc for Willow (Alyson Hannigan), and as being "possibly the single most significant event in the whole seven-season series." He feels that both Joss Whedon and Russell T Davies toyed with their LGBT fans' affections, and claim "neither Whedon nor Davies seem aware of the impact that these characters were having on viewers starved for such representations." Later, AfterElton published an opposing view, which analysed the character's death in view of the character's earlier refusal to admit to his relationship with a man, and claimed that, instead of being an expression of homophobia, the death was a sign that the LGBT community was leaving behind its image of victimhood. In 2012 David Brown of the Radio Times described Ianto's demise as one of televisions five most shocking death scenes and "surely [Torchwood's] finest hour".

The website Den of Geek praised Davies's writing of Ianto's death, and likened the tough story-driven decision to those used in critically acclaimed shows The Sopranos, Battlestar Galactica and The Wire. Den of Geek felt the real tension of knowing any character could die, however popular, was "refreshing" in comparison to impossibly death-defying characters such as 24's Jack Bauer (Kiefer Sutherland). In 2010, Davies's replacement as Doctor Who executive producer, Steven Moffat, commented saying "I thought his death scene was brilliant." When the series screened in New Zealand, GayNZ compared the two contending perspectives, comparing those who viewed Ianto's death from the perspective of "dramatic necessity" to those who disparaged it as the result of thoughtlessness on the part of the series creators about the relative absence of representations of enduring lesbian and gay couples within television series. Ianto's death was compared to that of Tara as in the above critiques, but also contrasted to other television series where lesbian and gay couples were able to have enduring relationships, such as Six Feet Under's David Fisher (Michael C. Hall) and Keith Charles (Mathew St. Patrick) and Bad Girls' Nikki Wade (Mandana Jones) and Helen Stewart (Simone Lahbib).

GayNZ writer Craig Young places Ianto, like Buffy's Tara, in a larger literary tradition, commenting "just as Iphigenia's sacrifice at the hands of Agamemnon was necessary to set in train the events of Aeschylus's Oresteia... just as Ophelia's madness, suicide and accidental death led to the climatic duel between Hamlet and Laertes ... Ianto's death can be argued to be a dramatic necessity which adds to character and narrative development." The article acknowledged there being some validity in criticisms of modern TV dramas which uphold that it is frequently the gay relationships which "can never be seen to have long-term, fulfilled relationships". However, GayNZ questioned whether the pattern was solely gay, noting the equally tragic outcomes of homosexual and heterosexual relationships in American shows Buffy and Nip/Tuck. The website also took note of Ianto fans' displeasure when Jack was introduced to a new romantic partner in Alonso Frame (Russell Tovey) in Doctor Who episode "The End of Time" (2010), mirroring Willow's romance with Kennedy (Iyari Limon) in Season Seven of Buffy the Vampire Slayer. The article intentionally avoided making a definitive conclusion as to which "side" of the argument was correct. Young later compared Ianto's death with the subsequent killing off of core heterosexual couples in two British shows, Misfits and Being Human. These latter deaths are described as even more heartbreaking than Ianto's, and Young argues that these character deaths tell us more about transatlantic differences in storytelling than about portrayals of sexuality.

=== Fan reaction to death ===
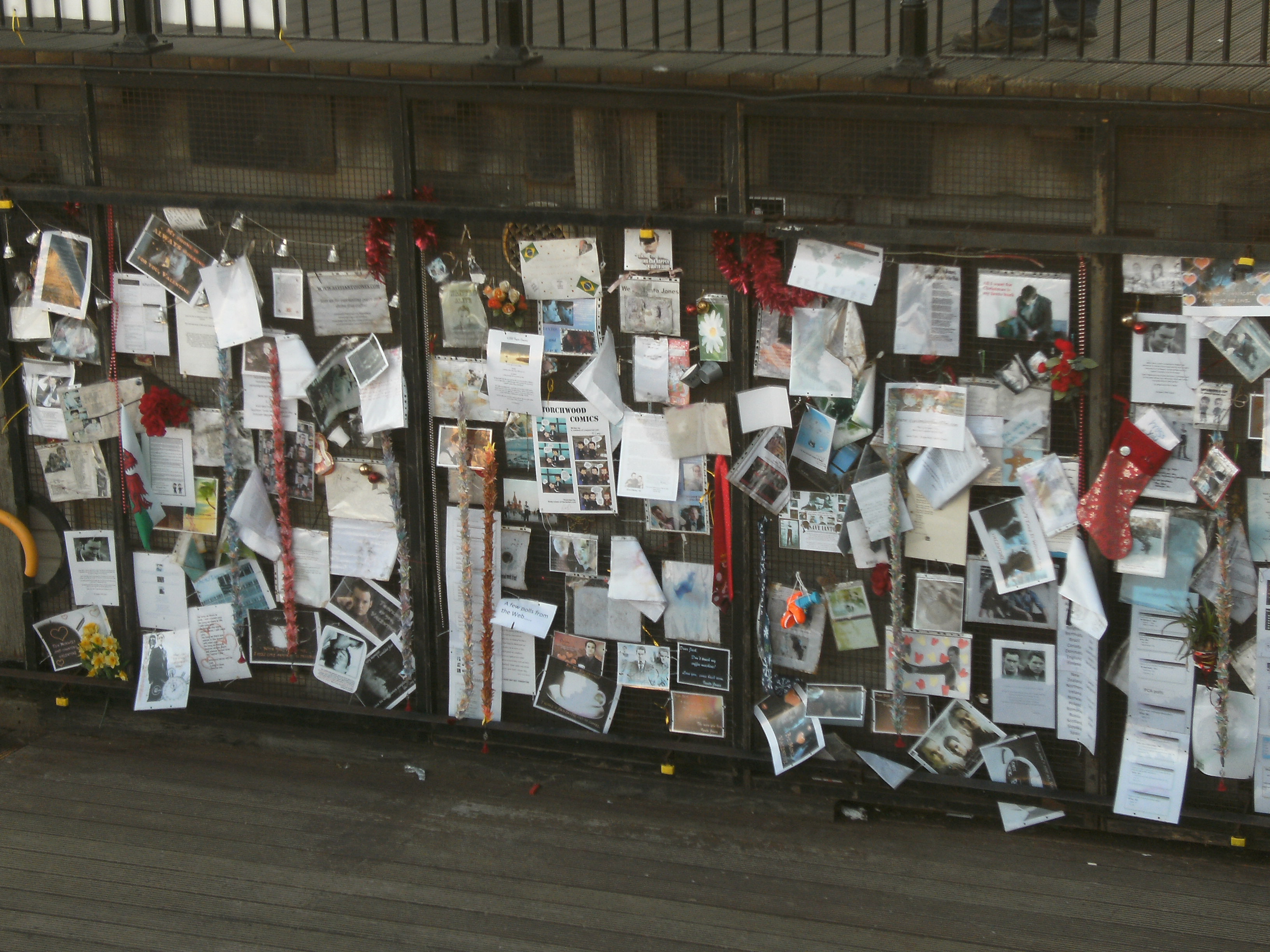
Ianto Jones memorial on the exterior set of Torchwood's "Tourist Office" near Mermaid Quay and Roald Dahl Plass in Cardiff

Many fans expressed their displeasure following Ianto's death in the third series. The website End of Show comments that "writer James Moran was so inundated with messages to his Twitter account that he posted a number of impassioned pleas to tone down the vitriol." End of Show writer Kirsty Walker comments that fans on Twitter accused Moran of "deliberately egging on the 'shippers'." Moran noted in his blog that of the thousands of messages from viewers, the "vast majority" were extremely positive, managing to express that they were "upset, angry and shocked" without making personal attacks. Moran declared the response from other commentators to be unacceptable, describing their conduct as the spewing of insults and "passive aggressive nonsense". He noted that fans had accused him of deliberately trying to "mislead", "lie" and "hurt" them, said that he hated them, was "laughing at them" and "slapping [them] in the face", and claimed that he had "killed the show", had attempted to drive away existing fans to court newer and "cooler" viewers, and had deliberately hurt depressed people "with dark storylines." In a poll conducted by Digital Spy shortly after Ianto's death, 27.4% of voters claimed that they would no longer watch Torchwood. Responding to these results, Gareth David-Lloyd thanked the fans for their dedication to the show and the character but urged them to have faith in the writers. On the show's Facebook groups, fans expressed anger towards creator Russell T Davies and some claimed they would stop watching the show. Walker herself had felt that the end of Jack's relationship with Ianto could "change the show beyond all recognition."

io9 commented that fans on Moran's blog accused him of homophobia; one quoted fan likened it to 1950s-style homophobia "where all the queer folks died ... and the straight people walk away completely unscathed." io9 writer Charlie Jane Anders comments, however, that "as people have had a bit more time to consider the new series, more thoughtful discussions have arisen." One such cited notes that it is unlikely that Children of Earth was intentionally homophobic since the writer (Davies) and lead actor (John Barrowman) are both openly gay. The same reviewer notes that however, "especially when viewed on its own, Children of Earth looks a lot like the same heteronormative, homophobic, biphobic and gratuitous tropes that appear in so many bad representations of queer people in popular culture." In response to the accusations of "de-gaying" Torchwood, Davies advised those people do some research into his career (creator of Queer as Folk) and "stop riding on a bandwagon that they actually don't know anything about". Asked to respond to viewers who felt "cheated" that Jack and Ianto's relationship did not come to fruition, Davies said:

That's the point actually. Both in fiction and in life. When someone dies you lose all that potential. You grieve over everything they could have been. Everything you hoped for them. Everything they might have achieved with their lives, everyone they could have loved. Every job they could have had. Every joy they could have had. It's gone.

— Russell T Davies, AfterElton interview.

Soon after the death of Ianto Jones during Torchwood's third series, a campaign to bring him back was started through networking sites such as LiveJournal, Twitter and Facebook. The resulting website, www.saveiantojones.com, organised a protest which encourages fans to send coffee, along with postcards and letters of complaint, to the BBC, a reference to Ianto's status as the "coffee boy". Via the Save Ianto Jones website, fans also campaigned to raise money for the BBC charity Children in Need in honour of the character. The fundraising site states that "Though we, his devoted fans, still hope that he'll come back ... we mourn him. In the series, he died saving the children of Earth; so it seems fitting to honour his memory by helping the Children in Need." Torchwood Magazine reported that the site had raised nearly £4,000, with individual donations ranging from £2 to £50. John Barrowman described the charity campaign as "a fun way to mourn Ianto" and stated that it was "the kind of thing that's really appreciated". Gareth David-Lloyd was flattered by the strong fan reaction, saying it is "satisfying in drama when you create such an emotional response, because that's what you set out to do in the first place". He praised the fan donations, claiming "So far, they've raised about £3,000 for Children in Need, and £1,000 for Lluest Horse and Pony Trust in West Wales, which I'm a patron of, so that's got to be a good thing". Coventry Telegraph records that by 21 July 2009, £4,172 had been donated in Ianto's name.

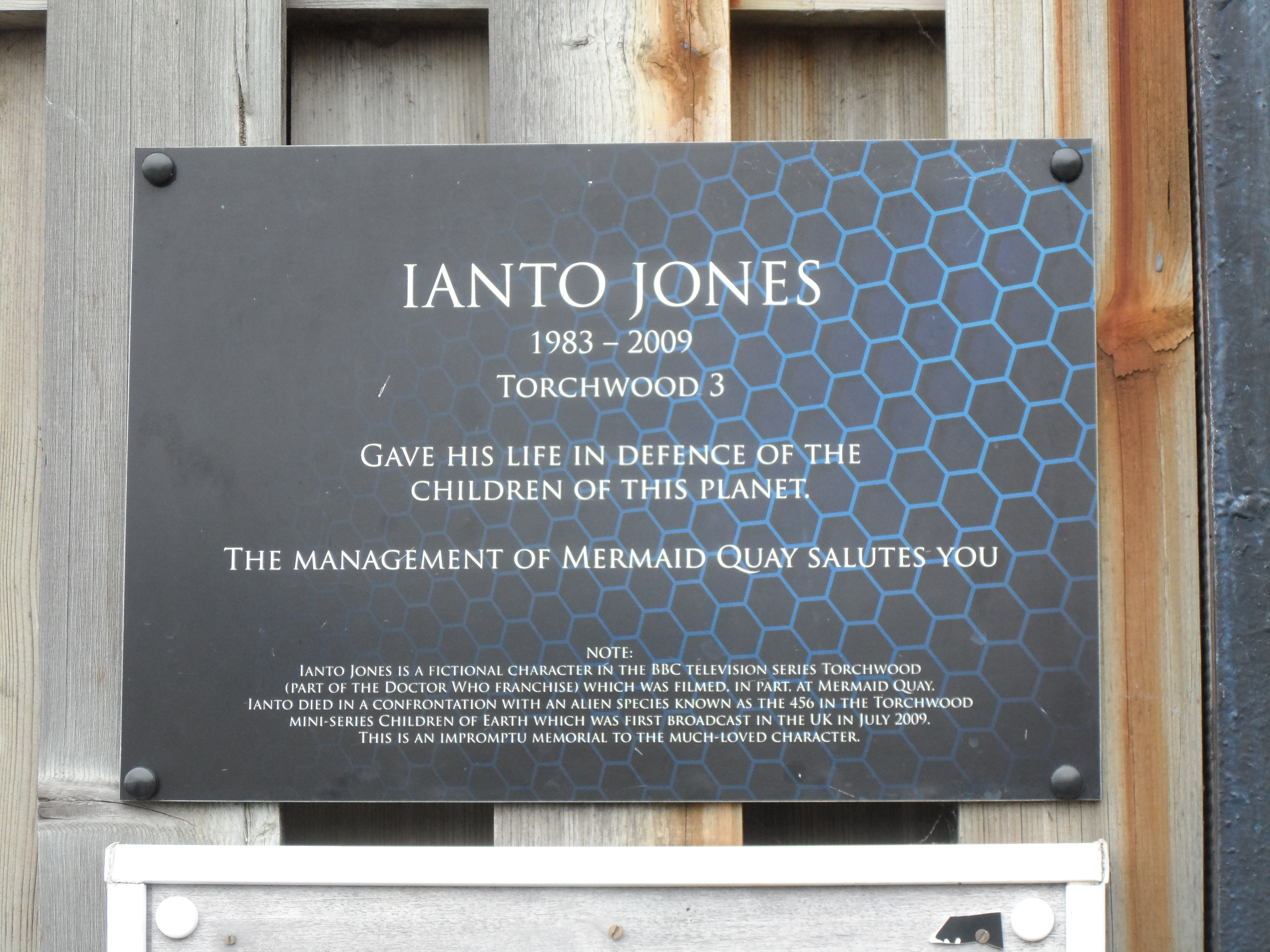
Ianto Jones plaque commemorating his life and death

In an interview with io9 on 28 July 2009, creator Russell T Davies was asked about the controversy surrounding Ianto's death and the fan reaction campaign. He replied "There's a campaign, because he was a coffee boy. But do you know how many packets of coffee they've received so far? Nine. So I think people writing online might sound like thousands of people, but they are nine." However, those involved in the movement believe that this number is much higher due to a post tallying the coffee sent within the community. When asked about the backlash in a separate interview with Michael Ausiello, Russell T Davies said "It's not particularly a backlash. What's actually happening is, well, nothing really to be honest. It's a few people posting online and getting fans upset". He also stated that the character was gone for good, and that his resurrection would devalue the "entire plot." He recommended that fans who wish to stop watching the show should watch Supernatural "because those boys are beautiful", or "look at poetry" if they "can't handle drama". Following these statements, the Save Ianto Jones website encouraged fans to contact BBC Wales rather than Davies, and temporarily presented on its front page the message "Mr Davies has made it clear in recent interviews that he views his fans with contempt, and as disposable, which saddens us" and asked not to be "abused". At Comic-Con 2009, a fan claimed that Davies "hurt" a lot of internet fans with his decision to kill Ianto, which she called "out of line." Davies replied that he would not change his mind regarding the decision, adding, "I've got to be blunt about this, there have been campaigns to send packets of coffee to BBC Wales in protest. There have been nine packets sent. I'm not taking the mickey, but that's a very small number." Executive producer Julie Gardner stated "We want people to be engaged, discuss and not always agree with us. At the end of the day, I make drama to support each author's vision. It's not a democracy. Whether people like it or not, it's storytelling." Simon Brew of Den of Geek criticised the Internet campaigns to resurrect the character, citing that the show would "lose far more credibility" if he were brought back. Brew also expressed doubt that the fans stating they would boycott a fourth series will do so. He summarised: "Torchwood now needs to continue to have the courage of its convictions, and for that to happen, the reset switch simply isn't an option."

On 31 July 2009, Digital Spy conducted a poll asking if it was "time to move on" from Ianto. However, a week later the website did not immediately publish the results, announcing "unfortunately it seems that this particular Poll was the subject of a campaign by diehard fans to distort the outcome". Neil Wilkes opined that this action by the fans "suggests the answer to the question 'Have people overreacted to Ianto's death?' is quite obvious". Later, a footnote amendment noted that 31.4% said it was time to move on, "while the remainder demanded RTD's head on a plate", a reference to his own wording of the original poll, which gave readers the option of moving on from Ianto, or the executive producer's head on a plate. James McCarthy of Wales Online described the reaction from some fans as "sickening" and quoted "crazed" fans on DeviantArt and Facebook who made explicit death threats against the Children of Earth writers. Gareth David-Lloyd stated he was very disappointed in those fans, whose message board conduct he does not support at all and called "completely unacceptable". David-Lloyd added that he "would hope the writers would be able to ignore comments like that". A number of fans were upset by the tone of the first Wales Online article, and their response prompted a follow-up from McCarthy. In their comments, fans pointed out that his article disproportionately highlights what they called the "ill-conceived, knee-jerk reactions" of a few individuals, and stressed that these reactions in no way represent the movement to bring Ianto Jones back, which they hold as fundamentally respectful towards the show's actors and writers. Fans have distanced themselves from the small minority of extremists, and have been keen to stress their peaceful activism, described as "thousands of fans who are raising money for charity, sending polite letters, and doing what we can to be supportive of the character and actor". In 2010, Doctor Who executive producer Steven Moffat told fans who contacted him that he wouldn't want to resurrect Ianto even if he could: "Not reversing it. Stop asking." In a 2011 poll published by the Liverpool Daily Post as part of a live Interview with writer John Fay, 70% of respondents replied that the decision to kill Ianto had been the right one, with 19% responding "indifferent" and only 11% stating that it had been the wrong decision, contrasting with the initial fan response. In response to a question, Fay also stated that he had not been affected by the "scary" fan reaction, maintaining that "a universe in which fictional characters aren't 'allowed' to die is ridiculous and limiting".

The public reaction to the death of Ianto has had a wider-reaching impact than simply the Torchwood fan community. For example, comic book writer Peter David cited the reaction to Ianto Jones's death when reflecting on where to go with the gay relationship between the Marvel Comics characters Rictor and Shatterstar in X-Factor v. 3. He opined that in "virtually any happy relationship", one of the characters has to die to "provide angst" to the more major character. His concern was "being tagged as against gay people", the way Russell T Davies was, even though Davies is himself gay.

== See also ==
- Ianto's Shrine
