= Ianto's Shrine =

Shrine in Cardiff

- Shrine
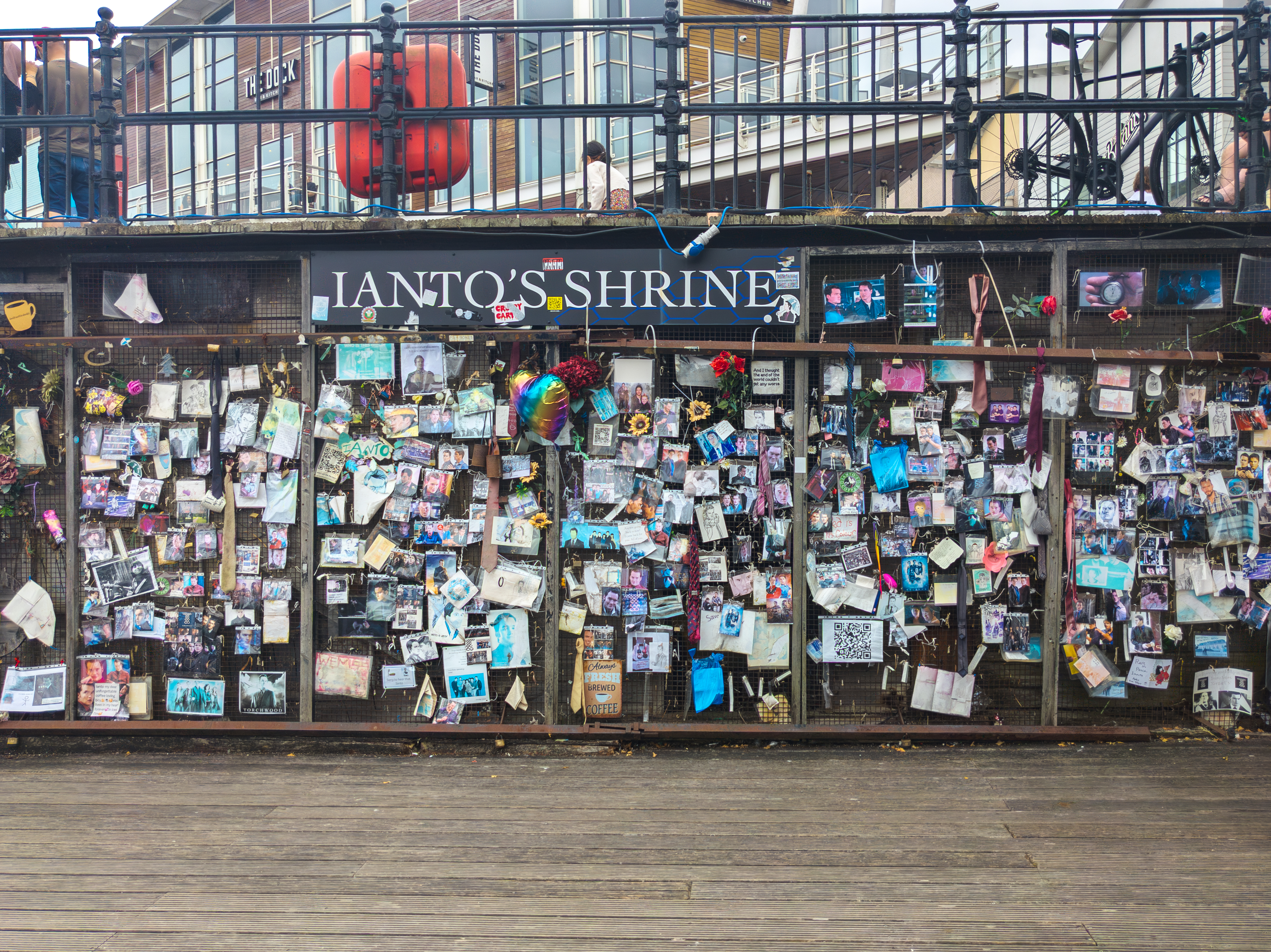
- Ianto's Shrine in June 2024
- Opened: 10 July 2009
- Demolished: April 2026
- Dedicated to: Ianto Jones
- Location: Mermaid Quay, Cardiff Bay, Wales, United Kingdom
- Interactive map of Ianto's Shrine
- Coordinates: 51°27′47″N 3°09′55″W

Ianto's Shrine was a shrine dedicated to the fictional character Ianto Jones, located in Cardiff, Wales. Established after the character's death in a 2009 episode of Torchwood, the shrine was visited by fans who often left tributes in the form of notes, photos, flowers, and memorabilia. It began as an impromptu memorial at a location used to depict the Torchwood Institute. Torchwood actors Gareth David-Lloyd and John Barrowman visited the shrine. In March 2026, 17 years after the broadcast of the episode, it was announced that the shrine would be removed, reportedly due to health and safety concerns.

== History ==
=== Background ===
Ianto Jones is a fictional character in the television programme Torchwood, a spin-off of Doctor Who. He was killed off in the third series of Torchwood, with the episode airing on 9 July 2009. He was a fan-favourite character and his death caused a strong reaction from fans of the show. Writers were inundated by vitriolic messages, according to James Moran, a writer for Torchwood.

=== Creation of the shrine ===
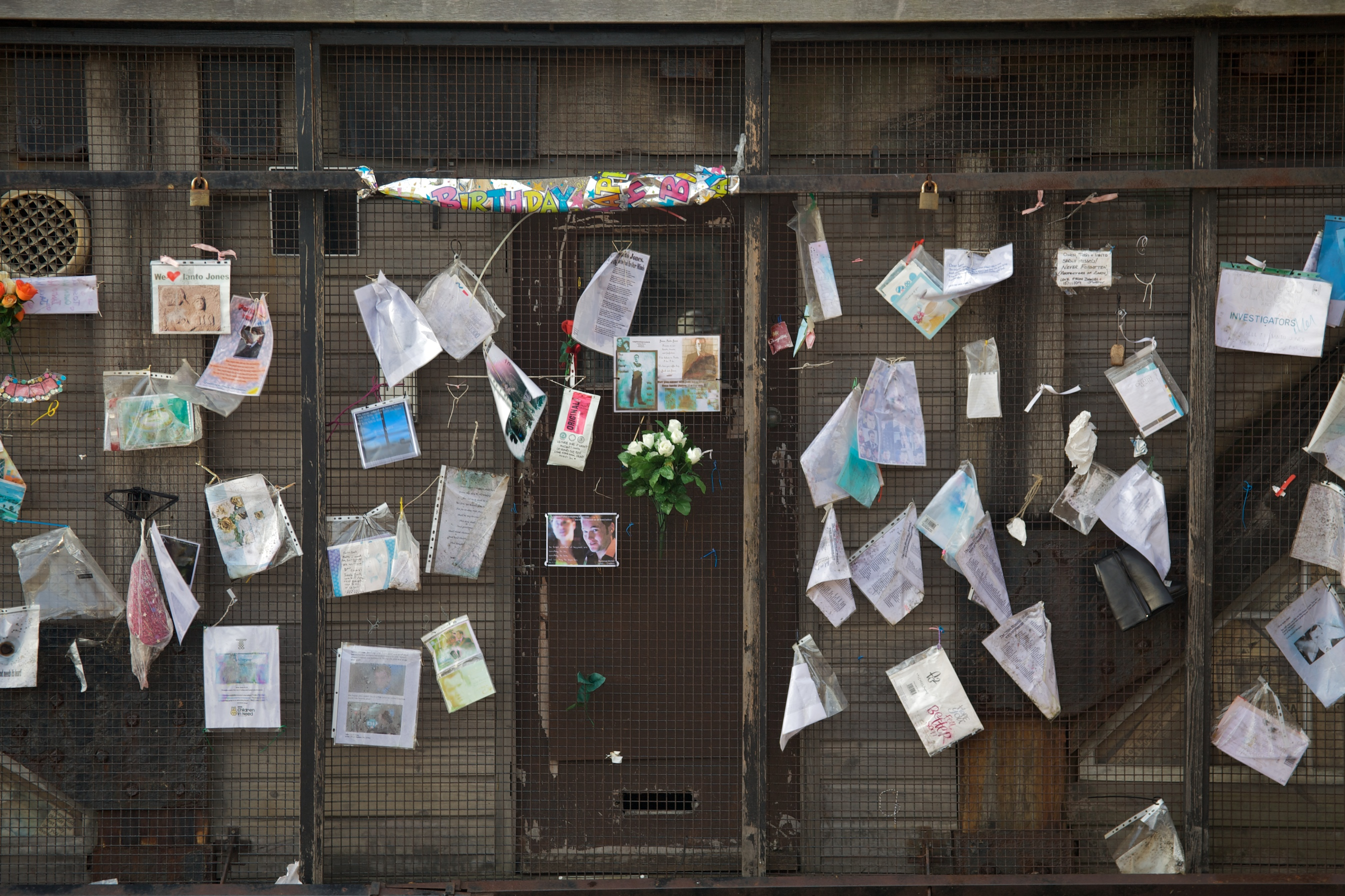
The shrine in November 2009

On the afternoon of 10 July 2009, an impromptu memorial was created at a location in Mermaid Quay which had been used to depict the base of the Torchwood Institute. A memorial service for Ianto, organised by the "Save Ianto Jones" campaign, was held at the shrine in February 2010, with plaques presented to Mermaid Quay staff who had looked after the shrine. A plaque that mimics blue plaques was added to the shrine by Mermaid Quay management in 2012.

=== Continued existence ===
Ianto's Shrine was visited by Torchwood fans from around the world; many left tributes in the form of notes, photos, flowers, and memorabilia. A common theme for tributes was LGBTQ stories, as Ianto was in a same-sex relationship in Torchwood; other memorabilia left at the shrine referenced Torchwood's identity as a Welsh TV show. Many tributes were left by Carol-Anne Hillman, who placed items on behalf of people who couldn't visit since 2014, and also decorated the shrine for occasions such as Valentine's Day, Easter, and Ianto's birthday.

In May 2016, Torchwood actors Gareth David-Lloyd (who played Ianto) and John Barrowman (who played Ianto's love interest, Captain Jack Harkness) visited the shrine during a visit to Cardiff. David-Lloyd visited again for the 10th anniversary of Ianto's death in 2019, and Barrowman visited again in 2021. David-Lloyd has described the shrine as "very weird but very flattering", and did not expect its creation.

=== Removal ===
In March 2026, Cardiff Bay management told Hillman that the shrine would be removed at the end of April. The decision was reportedly made due to health and safety concerns, as the wood and ironwork at the site was degrading. Hillman stated that she agreed to collaborate with Mermaid Quay on a new plaque for the site after repairs were completed.

Fans were generally disappointed by the news that the shrine would be removed, and a petition was created attempting to stop its removal. Some fans planned trips to visit the shrine before its removal. David-Lloyd stated that "it's a bit bonkers, but [...] it's a monument to the impact Ianto, and his relationship with Jack, had on the queer community", and that he was proud of the impact Ianto had made on fans.

== Gallery ==
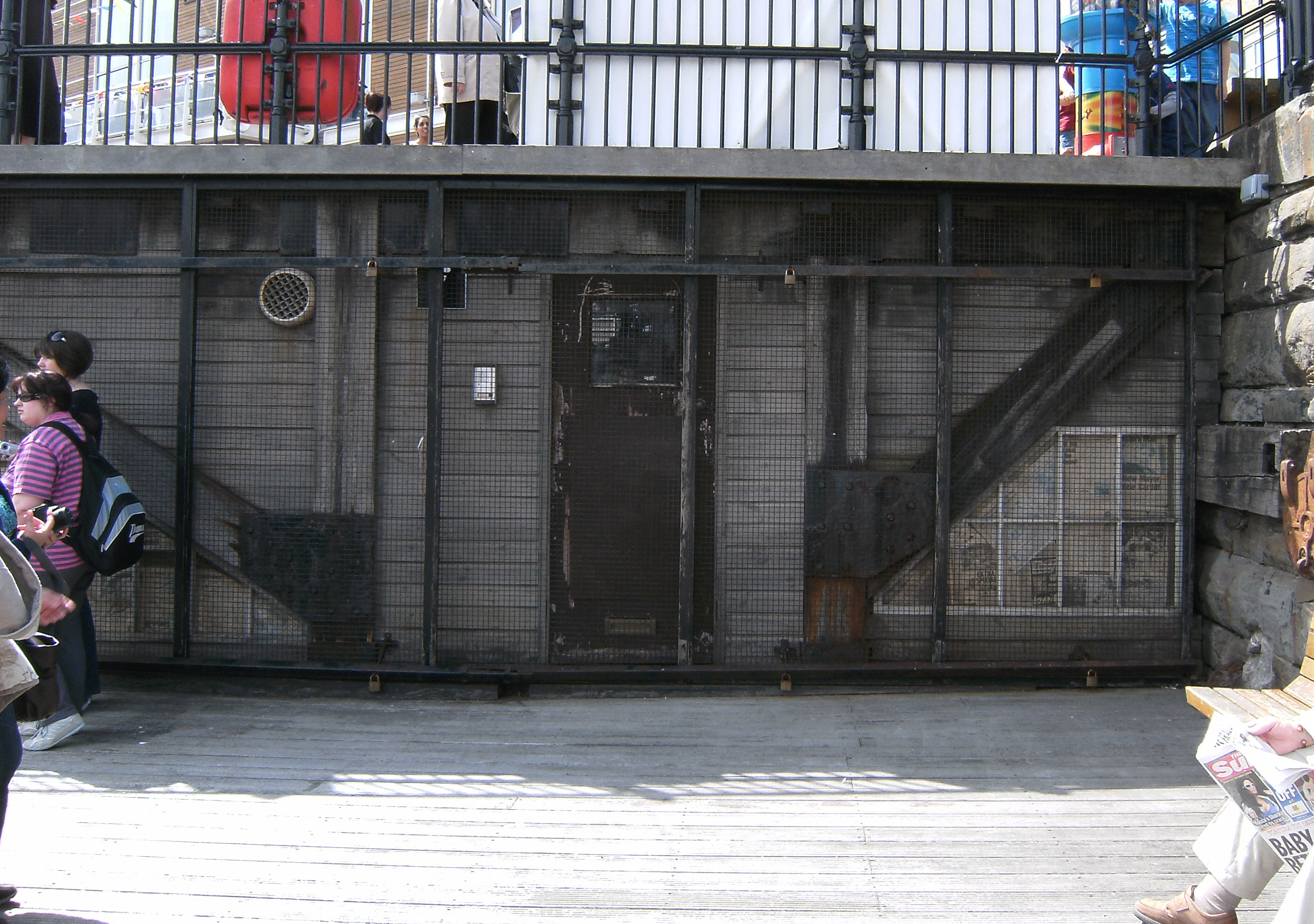
The site of the shrine in May 2009, before Ianto's death

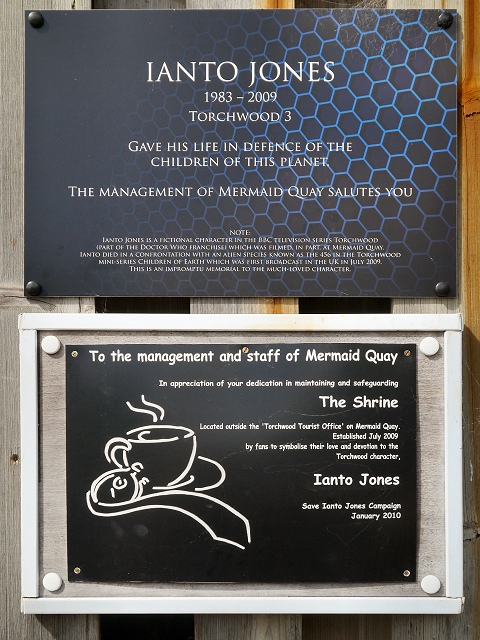
The plaque added by Mermaid Quay management, and a plaque by the Save Ianto Jones campaign

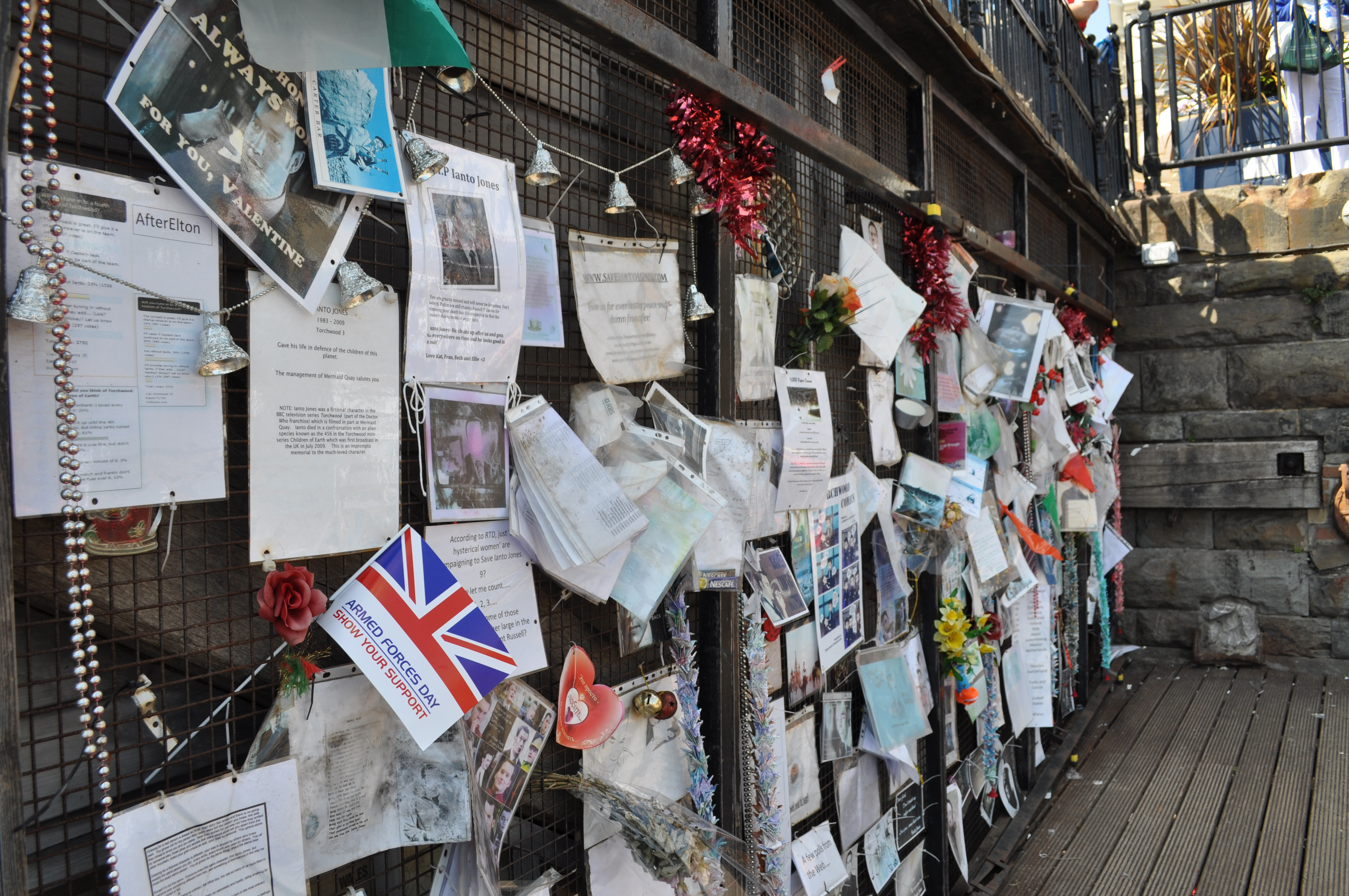
Tributes on the shrine in June 2010
