= Owen Harper =

Fictional character in Torchwood

Dr Owen Harper
- Torchwood character
- First appearance: "Everything Changes" (2006)
- Last appearance: "Exit Wounds" (2008)
- Portrayed by: Burn Gorman

In-universe information
- Affiliation: Torchwood Institute
- Home era: Early 21st century

Dr Owen James Harper is a fictional character played by Burn Gorman, and a regular in the BBC television series Torchwood, a spin-off from the long-running series Doctor Who. The character last appeared onscreen in the Series 2 finale, "Exit Wounds".

Within the series' narrative, Owen is the medical officer and a field agent for Torchwood Three, a team of alien-hunters based in Cardiff. In his private life, Owen is a narcissistic womanizer with a long history of sexual partners, including colleagues Gwen Cooper (Eve Myles) and Suzie Costello (Indira Varma), but remained indifferent to the affections of colleague Toshiko Sato (Naoko Mori). The show's second series would see Owen experience death, only to be resurrected and forced to adjust to the uncertainty of his undead existence, before ultimately being destroyed in his final appearance.

== Appearances ==
=== Television ===
Owen is introduced in the first episode of Torchwood in 2006, as the sarcastic and womanising medical officer for Torchwood Three; the first episode sees him recreationally use alien technology to get a woman and her boyfriend to sleep with him. Owen's first centric episode comes in "Ghost Machine", when an alien device makes him experience the rape and murder of a girl in 1963, which drives him to seek revenge for her. The next episode sees him kiss teammate Gwen (Eve Myles) in the midst of a Cyberman attack on the Hub, and as the series continues they continue a destructive affair which Gwen conceals from boyfriend Rhys Williams (Kai Owen). Owen remains oblivious to the devotion of teammate Toshiko (Naoko Mori), but experiences real love with a time-lost 1953 pilot Diane (Louise Delamere) and is distraught when she disappears in an attempt to return to her time, and despondent over this, Owen ends the affair with Gwen. Owen investigates a men's 'fight club' which uses alien Weevils, and Owen attempts to allow one to almost devour him; in the episode's dénouement, however, Torchwood's captive Weevil mysteriously cowers in fear from Owen. When Captain Jack (John Barrowman) and Toshiko are lost to the past, Owen as second-in-command takes control and fights with Ianto (Gareth David-Lloyd) over whether to open the Rift and 'rescue them'; Owen truly intends to rescue Diane, and is successful in opening the Rift and saving his teammates, but with consequences, for which Jack fires him. In the series finale, the opened Rift causes global chaos. An apparition of Diane sent by Bilis Manger (Murray Melvin) convinces Owen to lead a mutiny against Jack to open the Rift yet again; Owen goes so far as to shoot Jack twice in the head. Having unwittingly released the demon Abaddon, who is eventually defeated by a resurrected Jack, Owen is shocked to discover that Jack offers him his forgiveness.

The second series begins with Gwen now acting as the team's leader following Jack's mysterious disappearance, and the team now work more closely on field missions in an effort to compensate for this shortfall. Toshiko finds the courage to ask Owen on a date, and he does eventually accept. Shortly afterwards however, on a mission assisted by Dr Martha Jones (Freema Agyeman) of UNIT, Owen is shot dead by Dr Aaron Copley (Alan Dale). Not willing to let Owen die, Jack tracks down and uses the mysterious resurrection gauntlet to restore Owen to life: however, this glove works differently from the one from previous episodes, and Owen is left in a permanent state of living death. Owen is left to despair at his inability to eat, to drink, to enjoy sex and feel the beat of his own heart or heal from wounds, with the final point becoming a logistical concern after he breaks a finger on one of his hands, rendering that hand permanently limited as the bones will never mend. Despite being dead, he is forced to exercise regularly to avoid the onset of rigor mortis. His despair at his undead state causes Owen to become severely depressed and even attempt suicide, via drowning, only to find that he has no breath so it doesn't work. Mysteriously, Weevils also begin to follow Owen as if in worship. Owen is discharged again from Torchwood, but returns to his position after proving his sustained value as a field agent, with certain stealth advantages due to not feeling pain or having a heat signature. In subsequent episodes, two alien species ignore Owen's presence as being dead makes him of no use to them. The flashback-centric episode "Fragments" sheds light on how Owen came to join Torchwood: Owen's fiancée Katie (Andrea Lowe) developed a parasitic alien tumor, which brought him to encounter Jack when she died; Jack notes Owen's determination and medical brilliance, and so hires him. In addition to the standard BMBS degree of British physicians, Owen holds a dissertation-based MD. Despite his existential angst in facing life after death, the second series finale sees Owen die a second time, when he is caught in a nuclear meltdown caused by Jack's brother Gray (Lachlan Nieboer). This occurs at the same time as Toshiko is dying from a gunshot wound, and she and Owen spend their last minutes lamenting that they never formed a relationship.

Though Owen does not appear again, in the 2008 Doctor Who/Torchwood crossover "The Stolen Earth", Gwen vows to keep fighting in the face of a Dalek, for Tosh and Owen's memory, and in the miniseries Children of Earth (2009) it is shown that Gwen keeps a photograph of Tosh and Owen on her desk. In 2011 episode "The New World", from Torchwood: Miracle Day, Jack uses the alias of "Owen Harper, FBI" in an American hospital.

=== Literature ===
Owen appears in the first six of the Torchwood novels, published by BBC Books. The first wave, Another Life by Peter Anghelides, Border Princes by Dan Abnett, and Slow Decay by Andy Lane, were published in January 2007. Published in March 2008, and tying in with the concurrently airing second series of Torchwood, Owen appears in the novels Trace Memory by David Llewellyn, The Twilight Streets by Gary Russell, and Something in the Water by Trevor Baxendale. The novel Another Life reveals that Owen once had a relationship with a fellow medical student, Megan Tegg, in London. When he split up with her in 2001, he moved to Cardiff to continue his medical course. In the novel Trace Memory, Owen is seen on the verge of completing his medical course in Cardiff in 2003. These appearances are consistent with his history shown in "Fragments". As with all Doctor Who and Torchwood spin-off media, the canonicity in relation to the television series is unclear.

Owen also appears in the first two Torchwood audio books, Hidden by Steven Savile, narrated by Naoko Mori (who plays Toshiko). and Everyone Says Hello by Dan Abnett, narrated by Burn Gorman.

=== Audio drama ===
Gorman has reprised the role of Owen for various Torchwood audio dramas with Big Finish Productions, beginning with 2017's Corpse Day.

== Concept and creation ==
Owen was initially conceived as "a bit of a lad" and was going to be "more of a conventional leading man". However, as Russell T Davies and Chris Chibnall developed the series, they decided they wanted the character to be "more interesting". Casting director Andy Pryor reveals that they originally looked at "hunky" actors to play the part, but realised that they needed somebody more "complex" who would contrast with John Barrowman who plays Captain Jack. Burn Gorman was eventually cast in the role because Pryor had been impressed with his work in Bleak House and on stage; Pryor claims that Gorman "always brings an edgy, slightly dangerous energy to his work. He's sexy in a very individual way."

== Reception ==
The character was negatively received by some commentators. For example, Verity Stob's parody of the 2006 series of Torchwood, entitled Under Torch Wood (in the style of Dylan Thomas' Under Milk Wood), comments on Owen's unlikeable personality and behaviour over the course of series one. In Under Torch Wood, Owen introduces himself "Doctor Owen Harper. By dint of great effort, I have made myself even less sympathetic and more unlikeable than the other characters."
