= List of Torchwood comics =

Below is a list of comics based on the British television series Torchwood.

== Publication history ==
Torchwood Magazine includes a 10-page Torchwood comic strip in each issue; issue 2 did not include the strip. In 2010, publication of Torchwood Magazine ceased. Torchwood comics resumed publication under Titan Comics in 2016 with a new issue published monthly penned by Torchwood's John Barrowman (Captain Jack Harkness) alongside his sister, Carole E. Barrowman. These stories serve as a direct sequel to the Barrowman's previous Torchwood novel, Exodus Code as well as make reference to Big Finish Productions ongoing Torchwood audio series

== Comics ==
=== Torchwood Magazine (2008–2010) ===
No.	Title	Written by	Artist	Publication date
1	"The Legacy of Torchwood One!"	Simon Furman	SL Gallant	24 January 2008
Ianto Jones is contacted by his old mentor from Torchwood One, Rupert Howarth; a man Ianto presumed dead. Upon questioning from Jack, it is revealed that in order to escape from pharmaceutical companies who were trying to kill him over his immunity-boosting drugs, he faked his own death by torching his lab. Whilst Rupert is being questioned, something has burnt down the warehouse where he had been sleeping. Upon investigation, Jack, Owen and Gwen are attacked by an apparition that shows their worst fears. Barely escaping with their lives, they question Rupert once more whereby he reveals that the being they fought was a Chimera; a human whose DNA he had spliced with that of an alien in an effort to make a super-soldier. However the being became uncontrollable and escaped, determined to track its creator down. The Chimera tracks the team through the smell of their fear back to the Hub and begins terrorising the team. However, the reason Rupert got in touch with Ianto was to access the Torchwood mainframe and access the combination of drugs required to destroy the Chimera. Just as the creature is about to kill Ianto, Rupert injects the creature. In the resulting fall, the Chimera breaks Rupert's neck, leaving them both dead on the floor.
2	"Jetsam"	Brian Williamson	Brian Williamson	20 March 2008
A ship carrying alien artefacts is hit by a storm in Cardiff Bay, resulting in several alien devices washing up on shore. Among them is a giant armed motorbike. Next to it are tyre tracks indicating there used to be two. Surrounding the larger tracks are several tracks left by Harley-Davidsons leading Jack to believe the other bike was stolen by a biker gang. Jack and Gwen investigate several dive bars until they come across one that has been destroyed. Suddenly, the second giant bike comes out of the debris, piloted by, Drew Blayney, the leader of the bike gang. Back at the Hub, while Toshiko is investigating the bike she is possessed by the machine's AI. Toshiko's bike smashes through the wall of the Hub and begins to track down the second bike, bent on its destruction. Ianto manages to calm Toshiko down over the phone by getting her to remember a Japanese fable from her youth, thus allowing her to formulate a plan. Toshiko convinces Drew that his bike is about to self-destruct, leading him to state that he "does not want to die." The bike hears this and automatically initiates Drew's surrender. However, when Drew finds out he has been tricked, he tries to stab Toshiko leading the bike to shoot him for breaking the surrender agreement. Toshiko, as the New Champion, issues the bikes the order to shut down for good.
3	"Rift War! Part One"	Simon Furman	Paul Grist	17 April 2008
Multiple Rift contacts appear across the city, out of which come the Harrowkind; a race of warmongering creatures. The entire team leave the Hub to deal with the issue. The team quickly realise that their dispersal across the city was a device to distract the team. Jack asks one of the creatures what it wants to which it replies "war!" The creature then declares its race's wish to destroy Torchwood so that their Empire will not be wiped out by Torchwood's weapon: "the Rift." Toshiko returns early detecting large Rift activity. When the team return to the Hub, they find it has disappeared with Toshiko inside it...
4	"Rift War! Part Two"	Simon Furman	Paul Grist	15 May 2008
Toshiko manages to stop the Hub halfway to its destination by using the Rift Manipulator. It now hangs in a dark space. Jack tells Ianto and Gwen that the Harrowkind's distraction was so that a giant Rift storm could be generated to steal the Hub. When the Hub disappeared, so did all of the Harrowkind. However, Owen managed to deactivate and remove one of the recall devices from a dead soldier. Meanwhile, whilst Toshiko tries to reactivate the Rift Manipulator, she is confronted by a man named Vox. He tells Toshiko that when she cancelled out the Rift storm, she stayed exactly where she was but instead stopped her movement through time and is now stuck in the gap between one moment and the next. He tells her that he is hiding there from The Sanctified, the race who employ Harrowkind as shock-troopers. Vox gives Toshiko a miniature Rift Manipulator Device which he wears on his arm and tells her to activate it at the top of the water tower. The device shunts the Hub back into its regular time but burns out on the way, trapping Vox in Cardiff for the time being. And with two enemies now in Cardiff, the Sanctified are sure to be back...
5	"Rift War! Part Three: Funhouse!"	Simon Furman	SL Gallant	19 June 2008
Owen and Gwen are investigating Rift activity at Cardiff Castle when they are suddenly trapped in a large vortex full of medieval knights. According to Toshiko however, they are all illusions as she is picking up nothing tangible at their location. Vox explains that some races such as The Sanctified can harness Rift energy for different means. Meanwhile, Owen is attacked by one of the knights and when Gwen tries to shoot it, the illusion shatters and they fall onto a giant teddy bear. Sitting next to the bear, watching a hologram of knights fighting, is a Zansi Baby; a huge humanoid infant. Vox reveals that the Zansi were a race subjugated by The Sanctified centuries ago because of their harness over Rift technology – for example, the creation of a safe environment for a Zansi Baby to mature in using Rift energy. The Baby's presence within the castle is put down to unstable Rift energy within The Sanctified's Empire – something they blame Torchwood for. A perception filter is placed over the castle by Torchwood allowing Gwen and Rhys to practice parenthood and look after the child. After six weeks, the child has matured and transforms to its true adult form; a large tentacled creature. Despite the happy ending, Vox warns Jack that this is only the start and they should expect another attack from The Sanctified soon. However, Vox reveals he may be able to stop it by sealing the Rift forever...
6	"Rift War! Part Four: Dino Crisis"	Ian Edginton	SL Gallant	17 July 2008
After several false Rift contacts, one brings through a dozen dinosaurs. Scared, the dinosaurs go on a rampage. Ianto takes one out a Baryonyx with a harpoon gun. Meanwhile, the rest of the team track down the other dinosaurs to the Millennium Stadium. Using the corpse of the Baryonyx mounted on the back of a bus as a shepherd, the team herd the dinosaurs back into the Rift incursion they came from. As they go through, Ianto notices that the dinosaurs have been barcoded and are livestock for some unknown race, leading Jack to speculate that they should start looking at the bigger picture...
7	"Rift War! Part Five: Dark Times"	Paul Grist	Paul Grist	14 August 2008
Whilst chasing a Weevil, the team encounter a Rift incursion opening in front of them. Vox runs forward and closes the incursion with a specially made gun developed by the Sanctified. However, both Jack and Gwen have disappeared. The Rift has taken Jack and Gwen back to a forest in the year 600 AD. In front of them lies a spacecraft, but as they approach it, they attacked by men with swords and arrows. They fight them off, but as they get closer, Gwen turns on Jack and tries to stop him getting to the ship. Meanwhile, Tosh and Vox work together to re-boost the signal using the gun and open the incursion once again to get Jack and Gwen out. Jack calms Gwen down and makes her see sense. They enter the craft and encounter an empath pilot, a creature who projects its emotion into the world around it. It was the pilot who caused the humans to protect it. Vox enters the craft behind them and tells them to leave. He tells them that he will be able to help the creature due to its similarity to Sanctified technology. Jack and Gwen travel back through, closely followed by Vox. He tells them that he sent the empath pilot back where it came from. However, the creature lies dead on the floor...
8	"Rift War! Part Six: Circles"	Paul Grist	Paul Grist	12 September 2008
In 1918, Harriet Derbyshire is arranging to borrow a tank from an army captain. Meanwhile, Gerald Carter is infiltrating a ritual at an ancient circle of stones. However, he is discovered by one of the members of the cult who threaten to sacrifice him. They are interrupted by the arrival of Harriet in the tank. But suddenly, the stones around them begin to glow... In the modern day, Torchwood and Vox are investigating the very same circle of stones. Jack tells the team that once every 90 years, the circles focus the Rift energy in the area. Jack wants to study the area to learn how to control the Rift and stop the Sanctified but Vox wants to destroy the circle so the Sanctified can't use it against them. An old man comes up to Toshiko and Ianto and claims to recognise them, saying they are both still so young "after all this time..." When Gwen tries to steer the man away from the site, he takes out a knife and reveals that he is the leader of the cult from 1918. Suddenly, the stones around them begin to glow... Ianto and Tosh find themselves in 1918 and Harriet, Gerald and the tank are now in 2008. While, Ianto and Tosh fight the cult members off and Jack, Harriet and Gerald have a reunion. Vox steals the tank and drives it into the stones, breaking the circle causing everything to fall back to its own time...
9	"Rift War! Part Seven: The Man Who Fell to Earth"	Ian Edginton	D'Israeli	9 October 2008
An oddly-shaped Rift incursion, "shaped more like a door than a tear", appears at the local shopping centre. By the time Jack and Gwen arrive however, whatever came through has disappeared. They check the CCTV tapes and witness a metal egg-shaped object transform into a likeness of Johnny Depp. Suddenly they hear screams from another section of the shopping centre but it is just several women screaming over the likeness of Depp. He has been cornered in the Marks and Sparks stock room. Jack and Gwen enter the room, but the alien escapes under the guise of a male model who featured on one of the posters. They chase the man through the centre when suddenly, they themselves are being chased by the Harrowkind. The Harrowkind start firing at Jack and Gwen who both take hits. The man runs over and touches Jack and Gwen and with a blinding flash of light, all three are gone. Tosh's sensors back at the Hub reveal that they are no longer on the planet. When Jack and Gwen come to they are confronted by a metal man who reveals that they are inside him...
10	"Rift War! Part Eight: The Enemy of my Enemy..."	Ian Edginton	D'Israeli	6 November 2008
11	"Rift War! Part Nine: The Calm Before"	Paul Grist	Paul Grist	4 December 2008
12	"Rift War! Part Ten: The Storm"	Paul Grist	Paul Grist	31 December 2008
13	"The Selkie"	John Barrowman & Carole E. Barrowman	Tommy Lee Edwards	19 February 2009
Captain Jack goes to Scotland to investigate the mysterious deaths of an island's male inhabitants. He discovers the creature responsible for the killings is an old acquaintance of his.
14	"Broken, Part 1"	Gary Russell	Adrian Salmon	April 2009
When a new hotel opens in Cardiff, the Torchwood team investigate strange disappearances to the guest, and they are unexpectedly reunited with an old enemy - Bilis Manager.
15	"Broken, Part 2"	Paul Grist	Paul Grist	June 2009
16	"Broken, Part 3"	Nick Abadzis	Paul Grist	August 2009
17	"Broken, Part 4"	Nick Abadzis	Paul Grist	October 2009
18	"Broken, Part 5"	Nick Abadzis	Paul Grist	December 2009
19	"Fated to Pretend"	Brian Minchin	Steve Yeowell	February 2010
20	"Shrouded, Part 1"	Gareth David-Lloyd	Pia Guerra	April 2010
21	"Shrouded, Part 2"	Gareth David-Lloyd	Pia Guerra	June 2010
22	"Somebody Else's Problem"	Christopher Cooper	Stephen Downey	August 2010
23	"Hell House"	Roger Gibson	Vince Danks	October 2010
24	"Overture"	Gary Russell	John Ridgway	December 2010

==== Online Exclusives ====
The following titles were released exclusively on UKTV's Watch website between 2009 and 2010 in conjunction with Torchwood Magazine

No.	Title	Written by	Artist	Publication date
1	"The Return of the Vostok"	Brian Minchin	Adrian Salmon	February 2009
2	"Ma and Par"	Oli Smith	Brian Williamson	February 2010

=== Titan Comics (2016) ===
No.	Title	Written by	Artist	Publication date
1	"World Without End, Part 1"	John Barrowman & Carole E. Barrowman	Antonio Fuso & Pasquale Qualano	August 2016
2	"World Without End, Part 2"	John & Carole E. Barrowman	Antonio Fuso & Pasquale Qualano	September 2016
3	"World Without End, Part 3"	John & Carole E. Barrowman	Antonio Fuso & Pasquale Qualano	October 2016
4	"World Without End, Part 4"	John & Carole E. Barrowman	Antonio Fuso & Pasquale Qualano	November 2016
5	"Station Zero, Part 1"	John & Carole E. Barrowman	Neil Edwards	March 2017
6	"Station Zero, Part 2"	John & Carole E. Barrowman	Neil Edwards	April 2017
7	"Station Zero, Part 3"	John & Carole E. Barrowman	Neil Edwards	May 2017
8	"Station Zero, Part 4"	John & Carole E. Barrowman	Neil Edwards	June 2017
9	"The Culling, Part 1"	John & Carole E. Barrowman	Neil Edwards	September 2017
10	"The Culling, Part 2"	John & Carole E. Barrowman	Neil Edwards	October 2017
11	"The Culling, Part 3"	John & Carole E. Barrowman	Neil Edwards	November 2017
12	"The Culling, Part 4"	John & Carole E. Barrowman	Neil Edwards	December 2017

== See also ==
- Doctor Who Magazine
- Torchwood Magazine
