= Toshiko Sato =

Fictional character in Torchwood

Toshiko "Tosh" Sato
- Doctor Who character
- First appearance: "Aliens of London" (2005)
- Last appearance: "Exit Wounds" (2008)
- Portrayed by: Naoko Mori
- Shared universe appearances: Torchwood (2006–2008)

In-universe information
- Full name: Toshiko Sato
- Nickname: Tosh
- Affiliation: Torchwood Institute
- Origin: London, England
- Nationality: Japanese-English
- Home era: Early 21st century

Toshiko "Tosh" Sato (佐藤 とし子, Satō Toshiko; /təˈʃiːkoʊ ˈsɑːtoʊ/) is a fictional character from the television series Doctor Who and its spin-off Torchwood, played by Naoko Mori. After a one-off appearance in the Doctor Who episode "Aliens of London" (2005), Toshiko is re-introduced as a series regular in the Torchwood premiere episode "Everything Changes" (2006). The character appears in every episode of the show's first two series as well as Expanded Universe material including Torchwood novels, audiobooks and comic strips.

Within the series narrative, Toshiko is the Cardiff branch of Torchwood's "technical expert", described as "quiet but highly intelligent", and a "computer genius". Aside from lead character Jack Harkness, she is the regular character with the longest history with the Torchwood Institute, having been recruited three years prior to the series. Her characterisation explores the differences between her nature and that of her colleagues and her difficulty in romantic relationships. A general backstory relating to her pre-Torchwood life and long-standing crush on colleague Owen Harper is hinted at across the first series, and explored more thoroughly in the second series. Mori departed the cast in the series two finale, "Exit Wounds" (2008).

== Appearances ==
=== Television ===
Sato first appears in the Doctor Who episode "Aliens of London", credited as 'Doctor Sato', when she is called in to examine a supposed alien corpse at Albion Hospital. Toshiko is reintroduced in the Torchwood 2006 premiere episode "Everything Changes" as the technology expert of the Torchwood Institute's Cardiff branch. In "Greeks Bearing Gifts", Toshiko enters into a sexual relationship with a woman named Mary (Daniela Denby-Ashe), from whom Toshiko receives a telepathy-granting necklace. Toshiko's experiences with telepathy distress her. She expresses despair and hopelessness, noting that across space, all cultures are essentially similar, leading to utter disappointment with existence. In the penultimate episode of the series, "Captain Jack Harkness", she and Captain Jack (John Barrowman) are sent to the year 1941 by the villainous Bilis Manger (Murray Melvin), where being Japanese, Tosh is the victim of bigotry. With their resident genius stranded, Ianto (Gareth David-Lloyd) and Owen are unable to open the Cardiff spacetime Rift and save her until Toshiko leaves them the necessary equations, which she is forced to write in her own blood. In the first series finale, a vision of Toshiko's mother is used to convince her to mutiny against Jack.

In the second series (2008) episode "To the Last Man", Tosh has a relationship with a soldier from 1918 (Anthony Lewis), who had to be frozen and re-awoken every year until the time was right for him to return to 1918 and heal the Rift. In episode "Reset", Owen agrees to go on a date with her, but dies at the end of the episode after being shot in the heart. When Owen is briefly revived by team leader Jack Harkness using a resurrection glove, Tosh says her goodbye to him by confessing that she has always loved him. Owen flatlines, only to revive again permanently, existing in a state resembling undeath. In the episode "Fragments", the audience comes to understand how Toshiko came to work for Torchwood; Captain Jack rescued her from a UNIT detention centre where she was held after she was forced to build a sonic modulator for an unnamed terrorist organisation. In the show's second-season finale, "Exit Wounds", Toshiko is shot and killed by Gray (Lachlan Nieboer), Jack Harkness's younger brother. She dies within minutes of Owen, having been unable to save him from his own death when he becomes trapped in a nuclear power facility bunker flooding with radioactive material. In the moments before their deaths, Owen apologises to Toshiko for never having managed to bring their relationship to fruition. By initiating the final log-off procedure for her account on the Torchwood computer system, Ianto activates a pre recorded message from Toshiko, in which she thanks Jack for saving her. She tells him that she is grateful for the opportunity to work in Torchwood and that she hoped her contributions were valued. After being killed off, the character is mentioned in the two episodes of Doctor Who which follow "Exit Wounds". In these episodes, Gwen (Eve Myles) mentions Tosh and Owen's memory, and later discover a "time lock" designed by Tosh which protects the Hub from Dalek invasion.

=== Literature ===
Toshiko appears in the first eight of the Torchwood novels, published by BBC Books. The first wave, Another Life by Peter Anghelides, Border Princes by Dan Abnett, and Slow Decay by Andy Lane, were published in January 2007 and form a loose story arc. Published in March 2008, and tying in with the concurrently airing second series of Torchwood, Toshiko appears in the novels Trace Memory by David Llewellyn, The Twilight Streets by Gary Russell, and Something in the Water by Trevor Baxendale. The novel Trace Memory depicts a five-year-old Toshiko living in Japan with her parents and elderly grandmother. This depiction is consistent with the character's history seeded across the series, although as with all Doctor Who and Torchwood spin-off media, the canonicity in relation to the television series is open to interpretation. Toshiko also appears in the novels Pack Animals and SkyPoint. Skypoint, set after "A Day in the Death" and before "Exit Wounds", depicts Tosh and Owen masquerading as a couple in order to investigate an alien sighting in a luxury apartment complex.

Toshiko also appears in the first two Torchwood audio books, Everyone Says Hello by Dan Abnett, narrated by Burn Gorman (who plays Owen), and Hidden by Steven Savile, narrated by Naoko Mori. The Radio Play Lost Souls, aired on BBC Radio 4 in September 2008 examines Jack, Gwen and Ianto's grief in the wake of Toshiko's death.

== Character development ==
Naoko Mori's addition to the cast of Torchwood was announced in April 2006. Mori had previously appeared in the Doctor Who episode "Aliens of London". Speaking of the decision to cast her in Torchwood executive producer Russell T Davies stated: "she was absolutely brilliant [in Doctor Who], and I knew then that I wanted to bring her back". Toshiko is introduced as the technical expert of the Torchwood team. The official Torchwood website described the character as "quiet but highly intelligent" and "focused and intensely professional, though sensitive". In a 2006 interview Mori described the character as being "at the cutting edge of technology" and stated that she "loves the challenge of trying to work things out". Though Toshiko at first seems "a bit square and quiet" Mori contends that "she's actually just a very private person" who doesn't like to share her feelings. Toshiko has a "very strong bond" with her boss Jack Harkness though is "not scared of expressing her opinions with him" and is shown to have a crush on colleague Owen Harper who Mori feels to be "one of those guys you can't help but really like ... and fancy a little bit". Torchwood producer Richard Stokes felt that in her characterisation of Toshiko "Naoko ... has a real vulnerability that you completely believe" and stated the character to be "emotionally the opposite to Owen". Mori felt the Toshiko centric episode "Greeks Bearing Gifts" to be "a real learning curve" that makes the character "stronger" and well as "more truthful and honest".

Discussing how Toshiko changes in the second series, Mori stated that the audience would see Toshiko "bursting out of her shell" and that the series would explore other sides to her personality, and other romances. Helen Raynor wrote the episode "To The Last Man" which she felt took Toshiko "on another step". Davies states that it always the plan to have a very big Tosh-centric story in the second story and felt it inevitable that the story "would end in tears". Mori felt the episode showed that Toshiko had "had the worst love life ever". Davies joked that the character is the "kiss of death" and prospective love interests should stay away from her. Helen Raynor felt that Tommy embodied "the perfect boyfriend" for Toshiko, whilst head writer Chris Chibnall stated that the character "has certain values, a sense of honour, a sense of propriety, a sense of quiet dignity" that "chimes with Tommy's sense of dignity and sense of duty". On account of the decision to kill off her character in the series finale, Naoko Mori has commented that it "made sense because Tosh has been through so much. She's come a full circle and had her journey." In regards to her input on the death itself, she stated: "one of the things that I wanted to ensure was that it made sense, and that the connection between Owen and Tosh had the right balance. All through the series I didn't want it to come across as her being this stalker girl with a crush on Owen. I wanted it to be deeper than that, because as a colleague and as a human being she cared for him. I wanted their last conversation to be delicately and well put." Mori has not ruled out the possibility of returning to the show at a later date.

== Reception ==
Karman Kregloe, a writer for the lesbian and bisexual female orientated media site AfterEllen.com, reacted negatively to the depiction of Toshiko's relationship with Mary. Kregloe criticises the use of female sexuality within the episode as a "manipulative tool" and a "throw-away tactic", pointing out that Toshiko's sexuality is not explored again subsequently. Digital Spy reviewer praised the character's storyline in "To the Last Man" feeling that Toshiko "bears all the emotions of the episode" and that the audience have a sense "of her blossoming as a woman". Alan Stanley Blair reacted negatively to Toshiko's subsequent storyline, feeling that "Mori has so much more to give this series and it is painful to watch her relegated to unrequited love status". The character is described as a "tragedy-queen" by Dan Martin of "The Guardian" in 2011, whilst Dave Golder of SFX claims that the character was "incapable of acting professionally for more than 60 seconds."

In a 2012 poll conducted by SFX magazine to find the 100 sexiest female characters in science fiction and fantasy, Toshiko was voted number forty-two. UGO Networks listed her as one of the "Best TV Nerds" in 2012.
