= Cardiff Waterbus =

River Taff water bus service in Wales

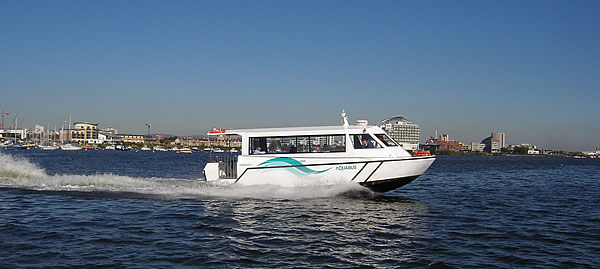
- Locale: Cardiff Bay and Cardiff City Centre
- Waterway: River Taff
- Transit type: Water bus
- Operator: Aquabus Water Transport Solutions Ltd; Cardiff Cats Ltd
- No. of lines: 3
- No. of vessels: 3 (Aquabus); 2 (Cardiff Cats)
- No. of terminals: 10
- Website: Aquabus; Cardiff Cats

The Cardiff Waterbus is a water bus service operated along the River Taff in Cardiff, the capital of Wales. Services are operated by 4 separate companies: Cardiff Cats Ltd (operating as Cardiff Waterbus), Cardiff Cruises Ltd, Cardiff Boats Ltd, and Aquabus Water Transport Solutions Ltd, both for the leisure market and for commuters, but charter services are also offered. Boats running hourly during the day carry up to 100 passengers from Cardiff city centre to Penarth via Cardiff Bay, forming a part of Cardiff's integrated transport system. The service started in April 2000.

The Cardiff Cats service has seen many celebrities as passengers, such as Emma Watson, Michelle Collins, Alison Steadman, and John Challis.

== Landing stages ==
Landing stages are located at:

- Bute Park (for Cardiff city centre and Cardiff Castle)
- Taff Mead Embankment (for Cardiff Central Station and Millennium Stadium)
- Clarence Embankment (for Butetown)
- Channel View (for Grangetown)
- Mermaid Quay (for Cardiff Bay)
- Barrage South (for Cogan and Penarth)

== Fleet ==
- Cardiff Cats Ltd – Princess Royal – Built in Portishead in 1959 and carries 100 passengers
- Cardiff Cats Ltd – Cygnet (Now sold off)
- Cardiff Cats Ltd – Sapphire (Now retired)
- Aquabus Water Transport Solutions Ltd – Seren-Y-Bae
- Aquabus Water Transport Solutions Ltd – Hydro 1
- Aquabus Water Transport Solutions Ltd – Enterprise

== Anniversary ==
Water Bus Stops

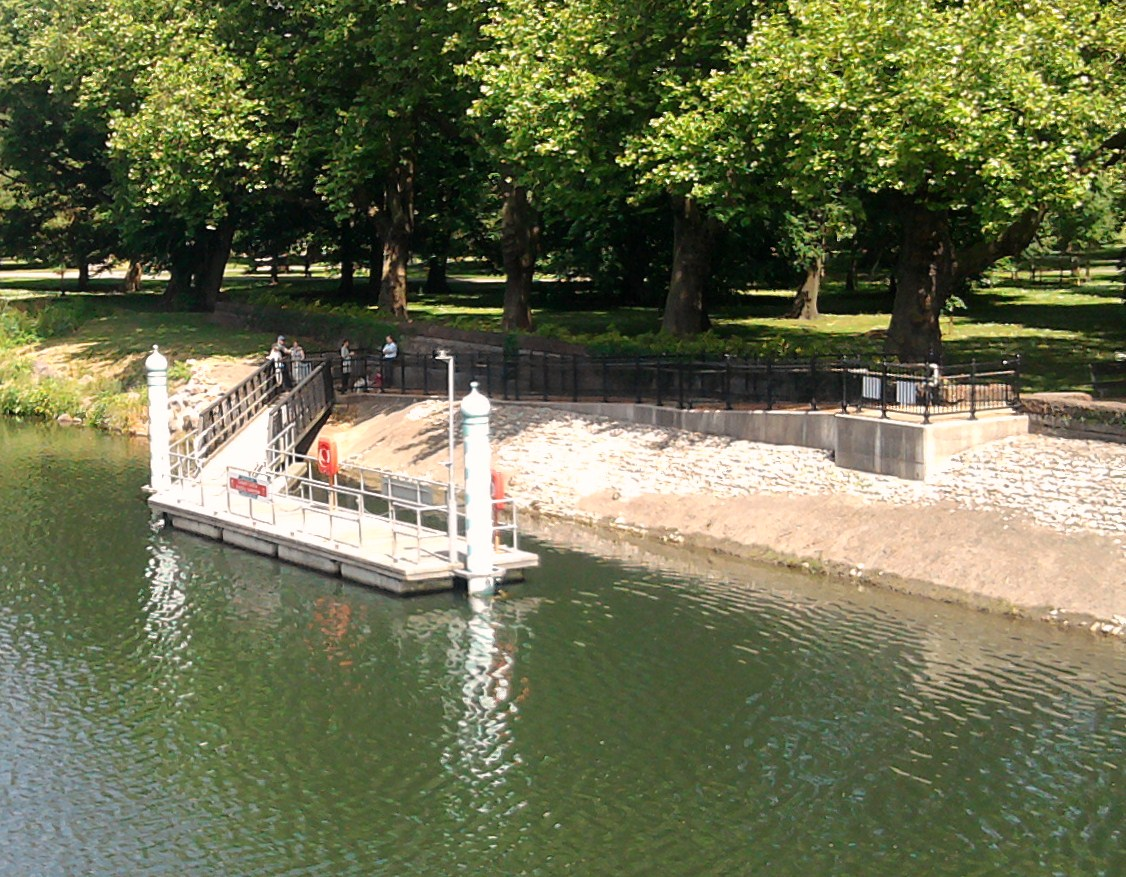
Bute Park

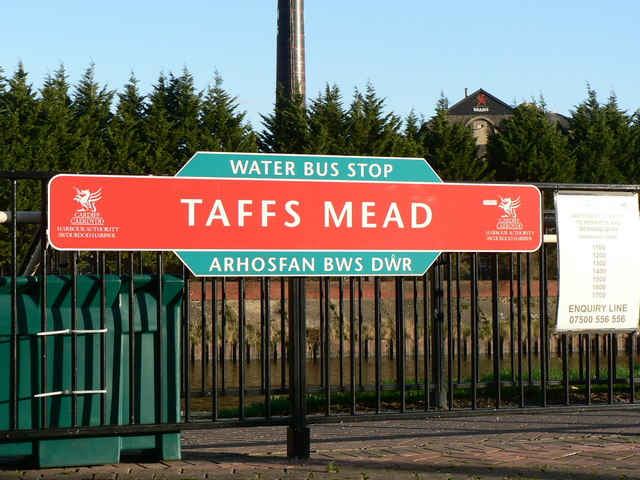
Taff Mead

The Cardiff Waterbus (Cardiff Cats Ltd.) celebrated its 10-year anniversary in April 2010. The fleet has clocked up 50,000 miles since operating on the routes, carrying an estimated 1,000,000 passengers.
