= List of Torchwood novels and audio books =

Torchwood is a British science fiction television programme created by Russell T Davies. A spin-off of the 2005 revival of Doctor Who, it aired from 2006 to 2011. Numerous novels and audio books based on the series have been released.

== Novels ==
No.	Title	Author(s)	Publication date	ISBN	Audiobook narrator(s)	Audiobook publication date	Notes
1	Another Life	Peter Anghelides	4 January 2007	ISBN 978-0-563-48653-4	John Barrowman	7 April 2007	Audiobook is abridged
2	Border Princes	Dan Abnett	4 January 2007	ISBN 978-0-563-48654-1	Eve Myles	7 April 2007	Audiobook is abridged
3	Slow Decay	Andy Lane	4 January 2007	ISBN 978-0-563-48655-8	Burn Gorman	7 April 2007	Audiobook is abridged
4	Something in the Water	Trevor Baxendale	6 March 2008	ISBN 978-1-84607-437-0	—	—	—
5	Trace Memory	David Llewellyn	6 March 2008	ISBN 978-1-84607-438-7	—	—	—
6	The Twilight Streets	Gary Russell	6 March 2008	ISBN 978-1-84607-439-4	—	—	—
7	Pack Animals	Peter Anghelides	16 October 2008	ISBN 978-1-84607-574-2	—	—	—
8	SkyPoint	Phil Ford	16 October 2008	ISBN 978-1-84607-575-9	—	—	—
9	Almost Perfect	James Goss	16 October 2008	ISBN 978-1-84607-573-5	—	—	—
10	Into the Silence	Sarah Pinborough	25 June 2009	ISBN 978-1-84607-753-1	—	—	—
11	Bay of the Dead	Mark Morris	25 June 2009	ISBN 978-1-84607-737-1	—	—	—
12	The House That Jack Built	Guy Adams	25 June 2009	ISBN 978-1-84607-739-5	—	—	—
13	Risk Assessment	James Goss	15 October 2009	ISBN 978-1-84607-783-8	—	—	—
14	The Undertaker's Gift	Trevor Baxendale	15 October 2009	ISBN 978-1-84607-782-1	—	—	—
15	Consequences	James Moran; Joseph Lidster; Andrew Cartmel; David Llewellyn; Sarah Pinborough	15 October 2009	ISBN 978-1-84607-784-5	—	—	Anthology series containing five short stories: • The Baby Farmers • Kaleidoscope • The Wrong Hands • Virus • Consequences
16	First Born	James Goss	21 July 2011	ISBN 978-1-84990-283-0	Kai Owen; Clare Corbett; Katherine Fenton; Joe Jameson; Carole Boyd; Michael Stevens; Susie Riddell	8 November 2011	Audiobook is unabridged
17	Long Time Dead	Sarah Pinborough	4 August 2011	ISBN 978-1-84990-284-7	Indira Varma	8 November 2011	Audiobook is unabridged
18	The Men Who Sold the World	Guy Adams	18 August 2011	ISBN 978-1-84990-285-4	John Telfer	8 November 2011	Audiobook is unabridged
19	Exodus Code	John Barrowman; Carole E. Barrowman	13 September 2012	ISBN 978-1-84607-907-8	Daniel Pirrie	14 September 2012	Audiobook is unabridged

== Original audiobooks ==
No.	Title	Author	Narrator	Publication date
1	Hidden	Steven Savile	Naoko Mori	4 February 2008
2	Everyone Says Hello	Dan Abnett	Burn Gorman	4 February 2008
3	In the Shadows	Joseph Lidster	Eve Myles	7 May 2009
4	The Sin Eaters	Brian Minchin	Gareth David-Lloyd	18 June 2009
5	Department X	James Goss	Kai Owen	7 March 2011
6	Ghost Train	James Goss	Kai Owen	7 March 2011
7	Army of One	Ian Edginton	Kai Owen	8 March 2012
8	Fallout	David Llewellyn	Tom Price	5 April 2012
9	Red Skies	Joseph Lidster	John Telfer	3 May 2012
10	Mr Invincible	Mark Morris	Tom Price	7 June 2012

== See also ==
- List of Torchwood episodes
- List of Torchwood comics
- Torchwood (audio drama series)
- List of television series made into books
