= Mermaid Quay =

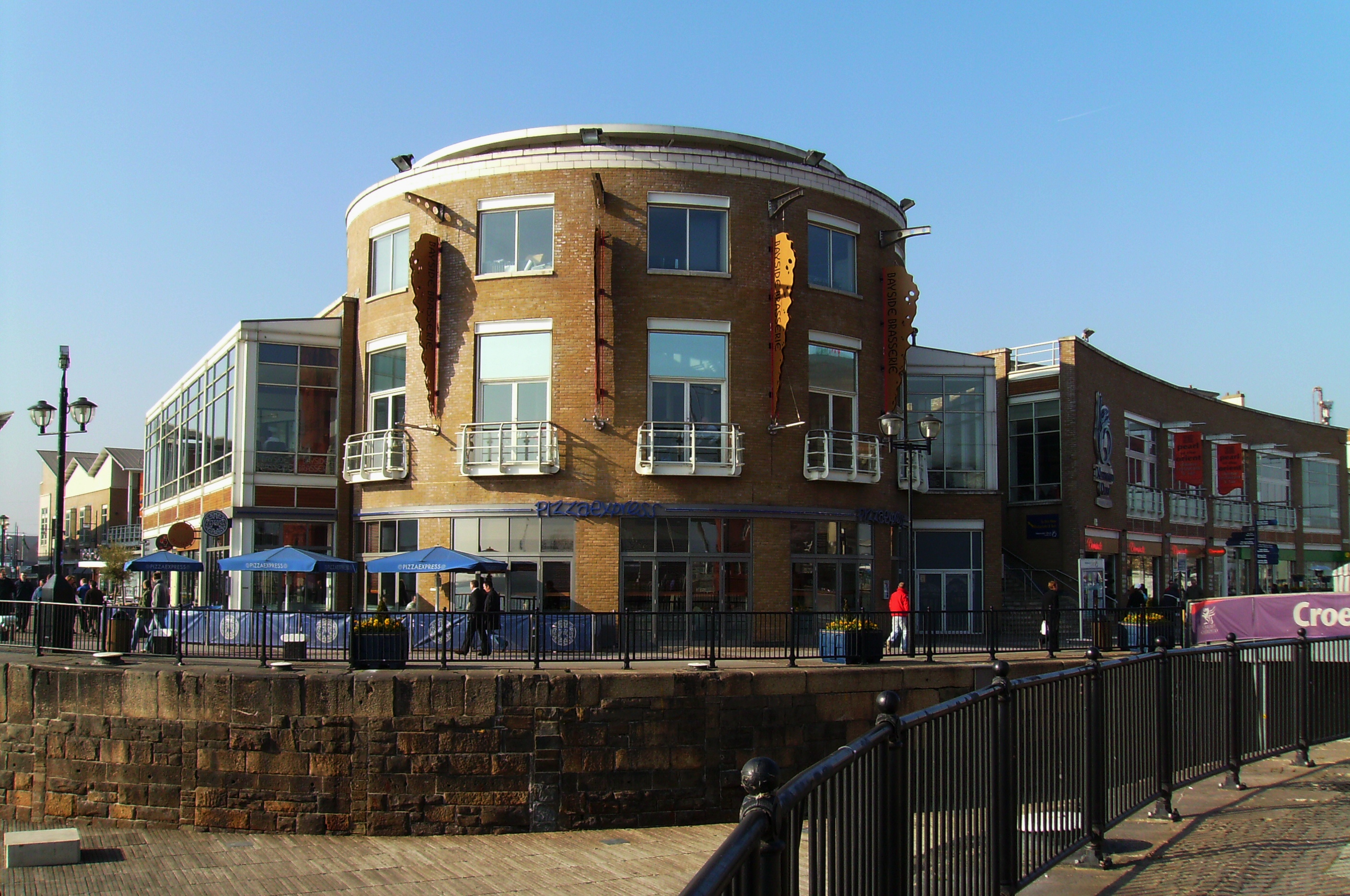
- Pizza Express at Mermaid Quay
- Location: Cardiff, Wales
- Coordinates: 51.46355°N 3.16504°W
- Opened: August 1999
- Developer: Sovereign Land and Schroder Exempt Property Unit Trust
- Owner: Schroder Exempt Property Unit Trust
- Architect: Benoy
- Floor area: 14,000 m^{2} (150,000 sq ft)
- Floors: 2
- Parking: 380
- Public transit: Cardiff Bay; Baycar; Cardiff Waterbus
- Website: mermaidquay.co.uk

Mermaid Quay (Welsh: Cei'r Fôr-forwyn) is a waterfront shopping and leisure district in the Cardiff Bay area of Cardiff, Wales. The 14,000 m^{2} (150,000 sq ft) development was opened in 1999, and includes restaurants, bars, cafes and shops.

== History ==
Mermaid Quay was at the centre of the regeneration of the Bay by the Cardiff Bay Development Corporation (CBDC). Part of the British Government's Urban Development Programme to regenerate deprived and run-down inner city areas. The CBDC was set up in April 1987 to regenerate 1,100 hectares (2,700 acres) of derelict docklands of Cardiff and Penarth - once the world's largest coal exporting port – to create Europe's largest waterfront development.

The Welsh Industrial and Maritime Museum, which held exhibits illustrating the industrial and maritime history of Wales, was demolished to make way for the development. The collection was saved, but the majority remains in storage at Nant Garw with only a limited few items on display at the National Waterfront Museum in Swansea.

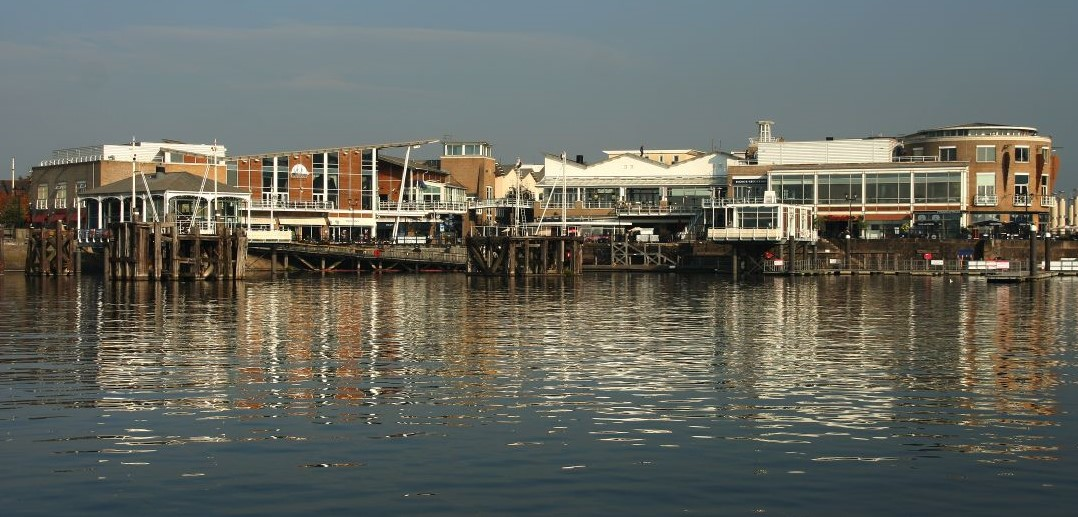
Mermaid Quay in 2000

Before the completion of the Cardiff Bay Barrage in 1999, Cardiff Bay was tidal, with extensive expanses of mud flats exposed at low tide. Construction of the barrage, one of the largest engineering projects in Europe, has turned Cardiff Bay into a 500-acre (2.0 km^{2}) freshwater lake with 8 miles (13 km) of waterfront.

Mermaid Quay was designed by Benoy and opened in August 1999. Since that time there has been significant regeneration of the Bay including the construction of Lloyd George Avenue – a new link road between the city centre and the Bay – numerous iconic buildings, and residential and commercial developments.

== Media ==
Cardiff Bay and Mermaid Quay have provided the backdrop for numerous episodes of programmes, such as the BBC’s science fiction drama series Doctor Who and Torchwood, with the fictional entrances (now decorated as Ianto's Shrine) to the underground Torchwood 3 Institute located in Roald Dahl Plass.

== Transport ==
- Train services run every 12 minutes between Cardiff Bay and Cardiff Queen Street stations, providing connections to the rest of Cardiff, its Valleys, and the Vale of Glamorgan.
- Boat: Aquabus and Cardiff CATS provide the Cardiff Waterbus services. The former travels to and from the city centre, whereas the latter travels to and from Penarth.
- Bus: Various Cardiff Bus services serve Mermaid Quay, including the BayCar service from the city centre, which operates every 10 minutes Monday to Saturday and every 20 minutes on Sundays and during the evening.
- Cycle: Off-road cycle routes run to Mermaid Quay from the City Centre in the north, and from the Cardiff International Sports Village in the west, running beside the A4232. Numerous cycle parking facilities are available in the area. Transport for Wales permits the carriage of cycles on services between Cardiff Bay and Cardiff Queen Street.
- Mermaid Quay has a 380 space car park opposite Techniquest.

== Gallery ==
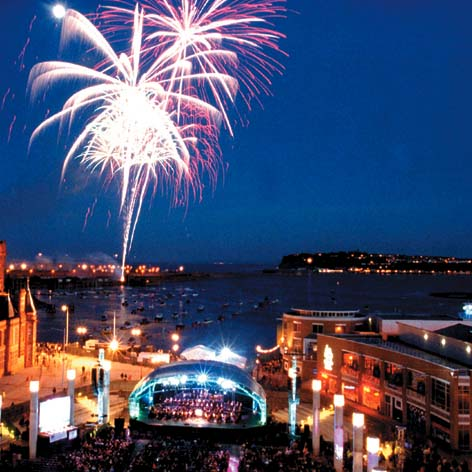
Fireworks in Roald Dahl Plas

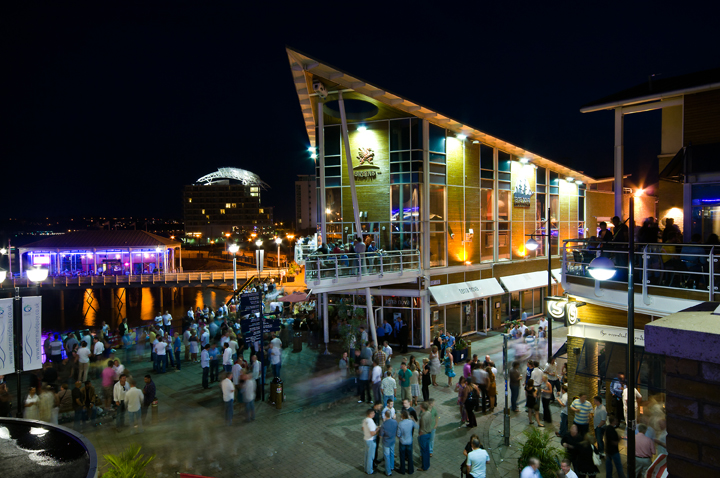
Night time in Mermaid Quay

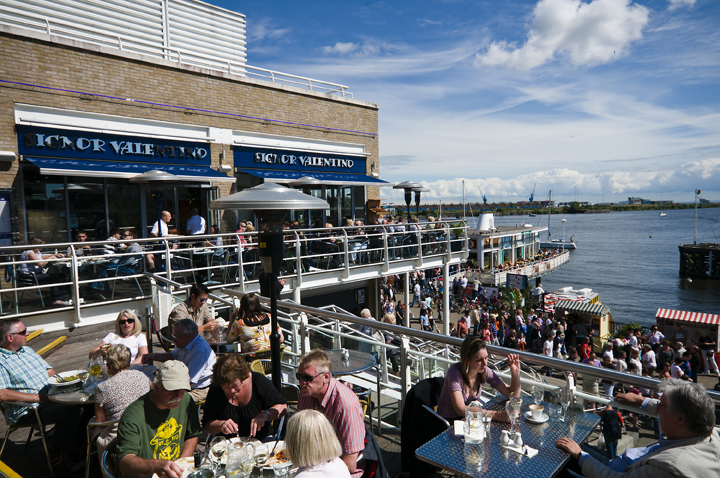
Diners at Mermaid Quay

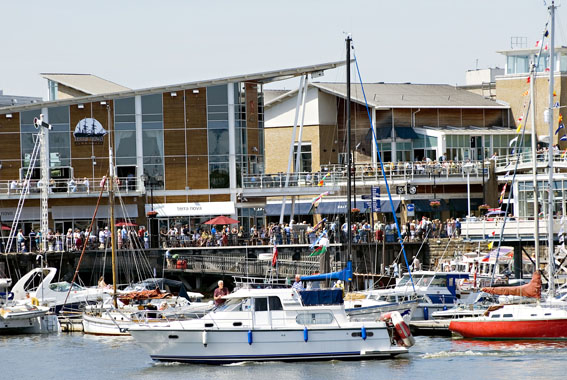
Yachts at Mermaid Quay
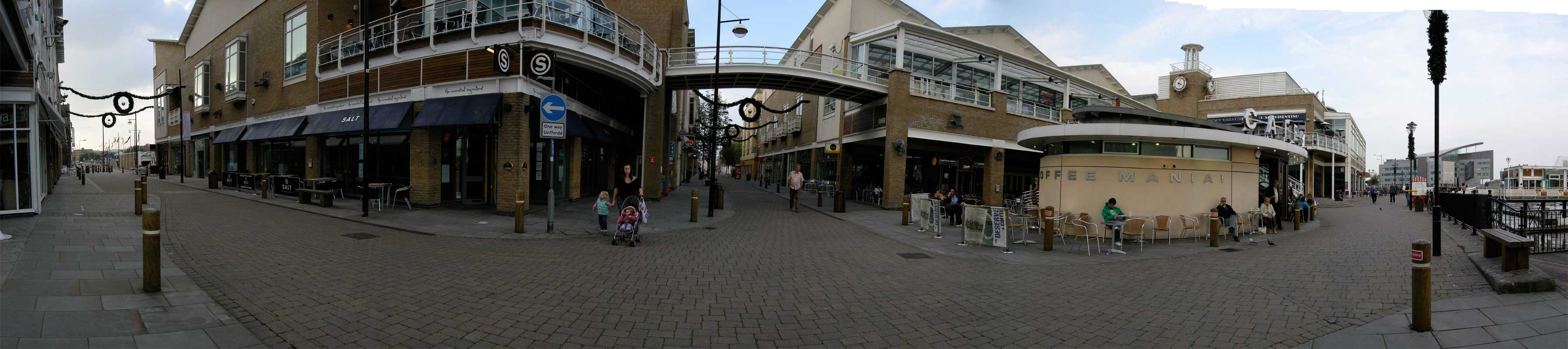
Panorama of Mermaid Quay
