= Naoko Mori =

Japanese actress (born 1971)

- 森 尚子
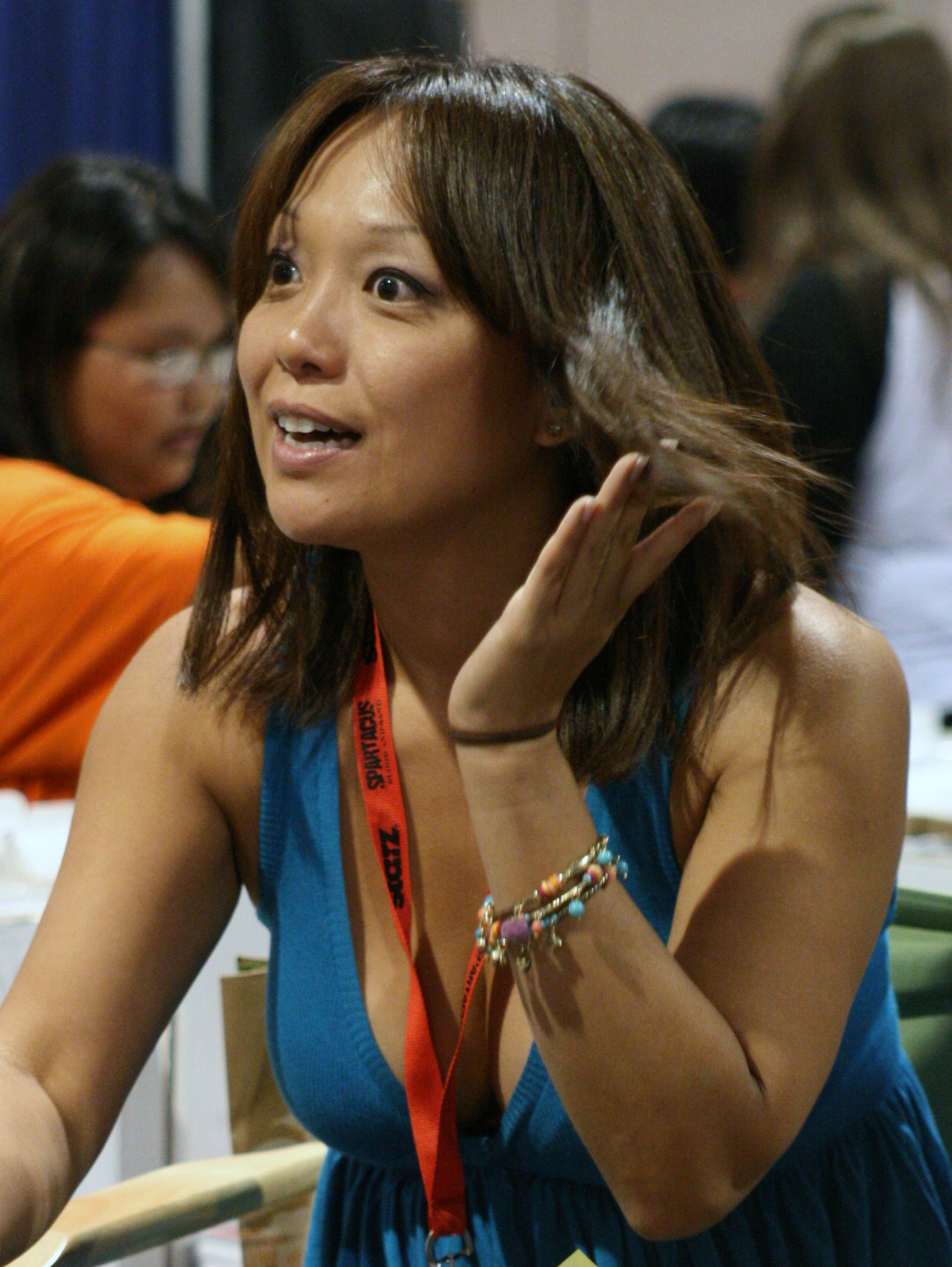
- Mori at the 2009 San Diego Comic-Con
- Born: 29 November 1971 (age 54); Nagoya, Aichi, Japan
- Education: Royal Russell School
- Occupations: Actress, singer
- Years active: 1992–present
- Notable work: Absolutely Fabulous; Casualty; Doctor Who; Manchild; Torchwood; Spiceworld; X-Men '97

Naoko Mori (森 尚子, Mori Naoko) (born 29 November 1971) is a Japanese actress based in the United Kingdom. She is known for her roles as Toshiko Sato in Doctor Who and Torchwood, Yasuko Namba in Everest, Sarah in Absolutely Fabulous, Nicola in Spice World, and Betsy Braddock/Psylocke in X-Men '97.

== Early life ==
Naoko Mori was born on 29 November 1971 in Nagoya to a Ryukyuan mother and a Japanese American father. When Mori was four years old, she moved to New Jersey due to her father's work. She returned to Japan when she was ten and moved to London two years later. When her parents were posted back to Japan, Mori was given the choice of either moving back to Japan with her parents or remaining in London on her own. She chose to stay in London, partly because she wanted to finish her GCSEs and gain some qualifications. She attended the Royal Russell School. Mori's father opened a bank account for her, handed her a cheque book and told her to find a flat or a bedsit for herself to live in. Mori said that being on her own at such a young age helped her to be a very independent person, although it was still a scary world to be faced so young.

== Career ==
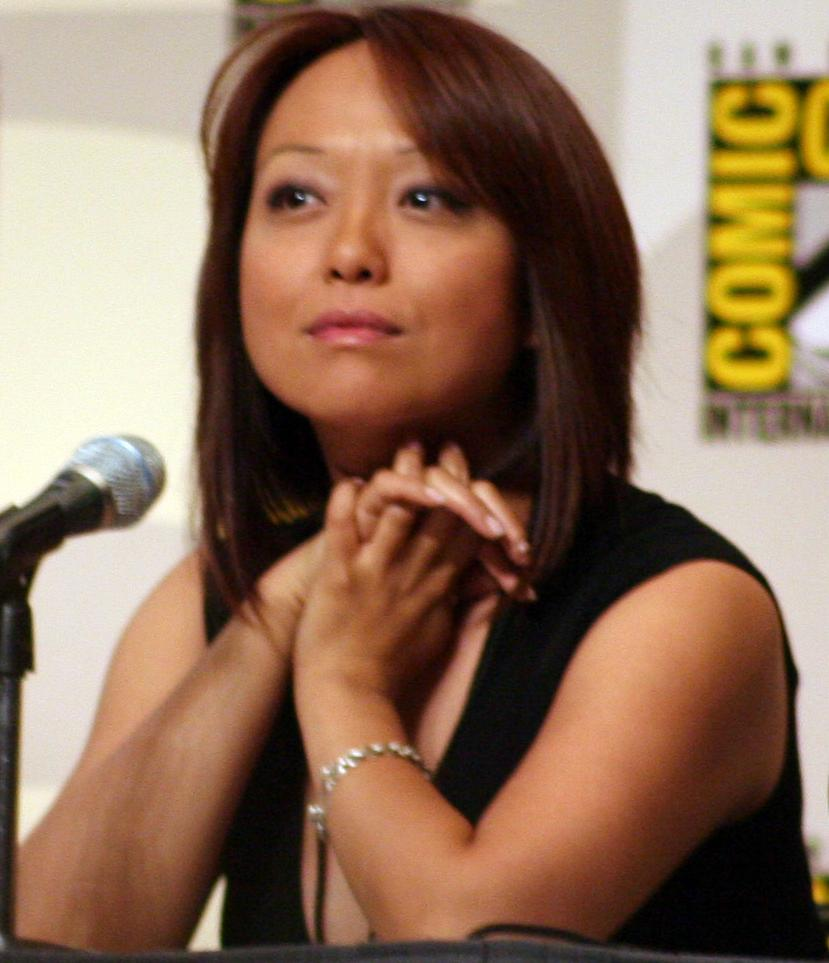
Mori at Comic Con 2008

While studying for her A-levels, she auditioned and joined London's West End production of the Vietnam War musical Miss Saigon. She later went on to play Kim and became the first Japanese national to play a lead role in the West End. From 1993 to 1994, Mori had a regular role on the hospital drama Casualty as the hospital receptionist Mie Nishikawa. Film roles followed, including appearances in the 1997 musical comedy film Spice World and Topsy-Turvy (1999). Mori also appeared in the television programmes Thief Takers (1997), Judge John Deed (2001), Spooks (2002), Mile High (2003) and Powers (2004). In 1995, she had a small role as a Japanese computer hacker in the film Hackers. Mori had a major role in the 2005 BBC docu-drama Hiroshima, which contained dramatic re-enactments of the 1945 atomic bombings. Mori also provided the voice acting for the villainess Mai Hem for the game Perfect Dark Zero.

In 2005, Mori had a small role as Dr. Sato in the Doctor Who episode "Aliens of London". Producer Russell T Davies took note of her performance and decided to bring the character back as a regular in the first two series of the Doctor Who spin-off Torchwood. Mori's Torchwood character, Toshiko Sato, was killed in "Exit Wounds", the final episode of Torchwood's second series, but Mori did not rule out the possibility of returning to the show at a later date. Since her exit from the show, Mori has reprised the character in multiple Torchwood audio dramas by Big Finish Productions, some of them with her as a lead with a guest cast, but some with her as part of the team with the rest of the main cast. She returned to the West End on 20 November 2006, when she took over the role of Christmas Eve from Ann Harada in the London production of Avenue Q, a role which she played until 14 April 2007. Mori portrayed Yoko Ono in the BBC Four production Lennon Naked, which was broadcast in the UK on 23 June 2010. The film reunited her with Christopher Eccleston, who played John Lennon, opposite whom she played Toshiko Sato in her Doctor Who appearance. Before joining Torchwood, Mori acted as Kim in Miss Saigon alongside future co-star John Barrowman as Chris.

Mori appeared in the film Everest (2015), as Yasuko Namba, opposite Jason Clarke, Josh Brolin, John Hawkes, Jake Gyllenhaal, Robin Wright, Keira Knightley, and Sam Worthington.

In 2018, Mori played Lady Thiang in The King and I in London.

She was also the voice of Nagisa Kisaragi in the 2018 version of Firestorm, and the voice of Betsy Braddock/Psylocke in the second season of X-Men '97 in 2026.

== Personal life ==
Mori is a Japanese Buddhist. She has an elder brother with whom she grew up in New Jersey. At the age of 16 or 17 she moved into a flat on her own in London. This was when her career expanded. She wanted to become a singer before she was an actress. Like Gillian Anderson, she is bidialectal with British and American accents.

== Filmography ==
=== Film ===
Year	Title	Role
1995	Hackers	Tokyo hacker
1997	Spice World	Nicola
1999	Topsy-Turvy	Miss "Sixpence Please"
2000	Running Time	Michelle
2009	Maneater	Morgan Tan
2012	Vexed	Satchi Kyoto
2012	Suspension of Disbelief	Floy
2015	Everest	Yasuko Namba
2017	Life	Kazumi
2018	Mamma Mia! Here We Go Again	Yumiko
2022	Mr. Malcolm's List	Mrs Thistlewaite

=== Television ===
Year	Title	Role	Notes
1992	Desmond's	Caroline	Episode: "Growing Pains"
1992–2011	Absolutely Fabulous	Sarah	12 episodes
1993–1994	Casualty	Mie Nishi-Kawa	7 episodes
1997	Thief Takers	Minako Takahashi	Episode: "Brand Loyalty & Black Mist"
1998	Bugs	Melissa	Episode: "Jewel Control"
1999	Psychos	Mariko Harris	6 episodes
2001	Judge John Deed	Mutsumi Yesayahoo	Episode: "Appropriate Response & Rough Justice"
2002	Murder in Mind	Naomi	Episode: "Rage"
2002	Spooks	Annette	Episode: "The Rose Bed Memoirs"
2002	Doctors	Molly Fletcher	Episode: "Feet of Clay"
2003	Manchild	Geisha girl	Series 2, episode 7
2003	Mile High	Natsumi	Series 1, episode 13
2004	The Smoking Room	Naoko	Recurring character
2005	Doctor Who	Doctor Sato	Episode: "Aliens of London"
2005	Hiroshima	Shige Hiratsuka	Documentary television film
2005	Hot Tub Ranking	Mia	6 episodes
2006	Little Miss Jocelyn	Beautician	Series 1, episode 5
2006–2008	Torchwood	Toshiko Sato	26 episodes
2010	Lennon Naked	Yoko Ono	Television film
2011	Private Practice	Patricia Ramsey	Episode: "If You Don't Know Me by Now"
2011	Three Inches	Annika	Television film
2012	Rocket's Island	Liz	2 episodes
2012	The Revolting World of Stanley Brown	Sarah Stripe	Episode: "Hiccupalypse"
2015	Midsomer Murders	Nadia Simons	Episode: "A Vintage Murder"
2015	Humans	Fiona	Episode: "Episode 4"
2015	You, Me and the Apocalypse	Nocturnapram Professor	Episode: "Home Sweet Home"
2016–2018	The Amazing World of Gumball	Yuki Yoshida (voice)	3 episodes
2018	Patrick Melrose	Doctor Pagazzi	Episode: "At Last"
2018	Firestorm	Nagisa Kisaragi (voice)	Pilot
2018–2021	Big Hero 6: The Series	Momakase (voice)	7 episodes
2019	The Terror	Asako Nakayama	Main role (season 2)
2020	Zoey's Extraordinary Playlist	Bonnie	Episode: "Zoey's Extraordinary Neighbor"
2022	Sister Boniface Mysteries	Lilly Ardwell	Episode: "My Brother's Keeper"
2022	McDonald & Dodds	Leyna Masamoto	Episode: "A Billion Beats"
2023	The Chelsea Detective	Steph Lang	Episode: "Golden Years"
2024	3 Body Problem	Marie Curie	Episode: "Our Lord"
2025	The Wonderfully Weird World of Gumball	Yuki Yoshida	Episode: "The Gourmet"
2026	The Boys	Golden Geisha	Episode: "Though the Heavens Fall"
2026	X-Men '97	Betsy Braddock/Psylocke (voice)	Season 2; 4 episodes

=== Video games ===
Year	Title	Role
2002	Mister Mosquito	Additional voices
2005	Perfect Dark Zero	Mai Hem
2006	Genji: Days of the Blade	Lady Shizuka
2016	Hitman	KAI
2017	Final Fantasy XIV: Stormblood	Yotsuyu
2018	Dragon Quest XI: Echoes of an Elusive Age	Miko, Additional Voices
