= Gareth David-Lloyd =

Welsh actor, writer, and singer (born 1981)

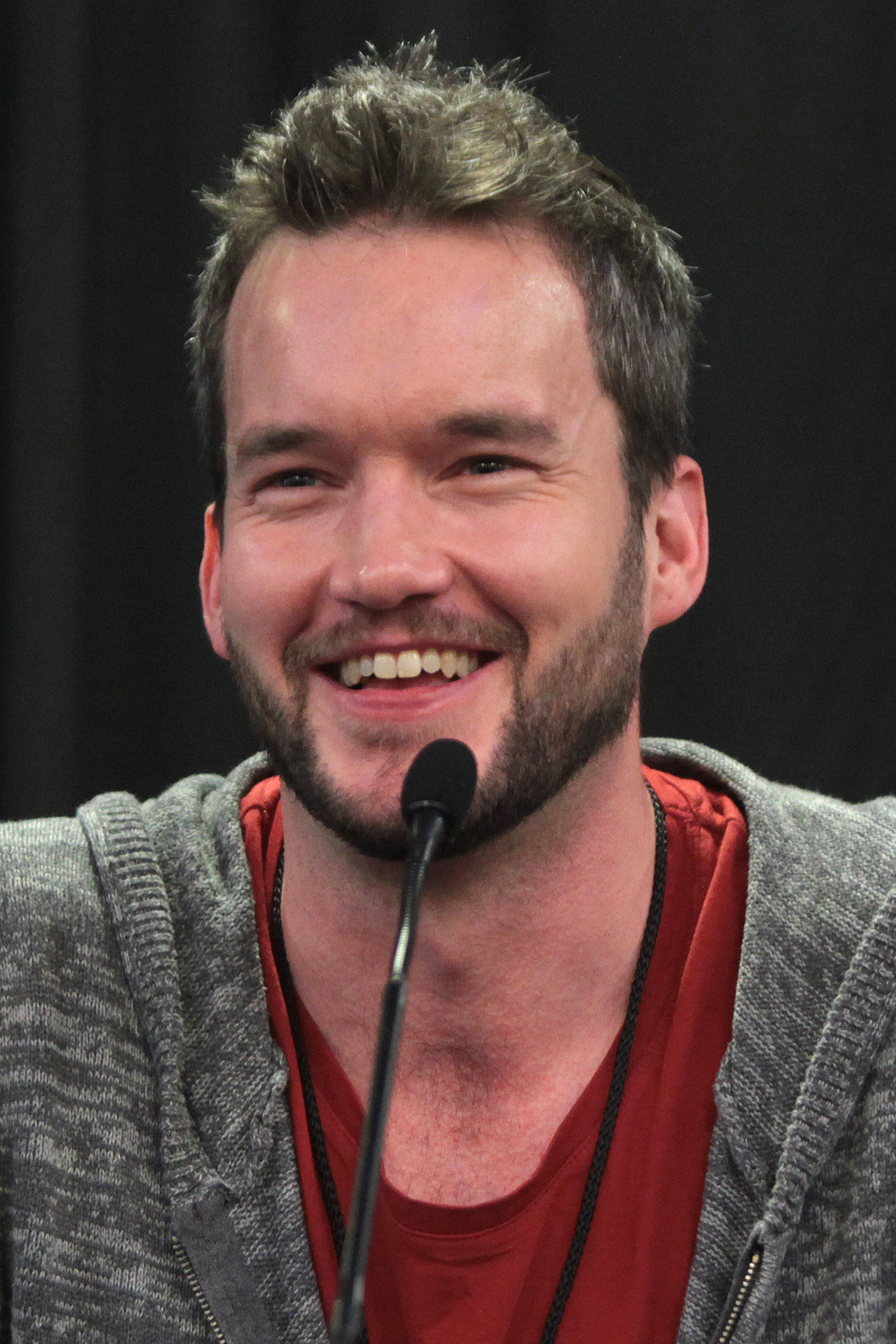
- David-Lloyd in 2015
- Born: Gareth David Lloyd; 28 March 1981 (age 45); Bettws, Newport, Wales
- Occupations: Actor; writer; singer
- Spouse: Gemma James (m. 2010)
- Children: 2

Gareth David Lloyd (born 28 March 1981), known professionally as Gareth David-Lloyd, is a Welsh actor, writer and singer, best known for his (Note: David-Lloyd uses both he/him and they/them pronouns; this article uses he/him for consistency.) role as Ianto Jones in the British science fiction series Torchwood (2006–2009). He also voices the character Solas in the Dragon Age games.

== Early life ==
David-Lloyd was born in Bettws, Newport. His first acting role was as a robot in a junior school play. As a teenager, he joined the Gwent Young People's Theatre in Abergavenny and The Dolman Youth Theatre in Newport. While there, he appeared in several plays, including Macbeth, The Threepenny Opera and Henry V, in which he played the title role. David-Lloyd studied Performing Arts at Crosskeys College in South Wales. When former Labour Party leader Neil Kinnock saw the young David-Lloyd performing at Monmouth Castle, he sent him £250 to use towards his acting career.

== Career ==
=== Music ===
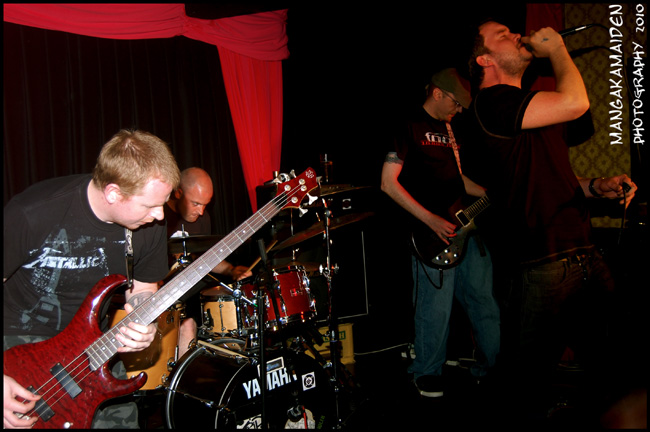
Blue Gillespie performing in 2010

David-Lloyd fronts the progressive metal band Blue Gillespie, previously known as A Breath of Blue Fire. The band participated in Sex, Wales, and Anarchy on 20 April 2008, and Orgee on 3 May 2008, at the University of Wales Institute Cardiff. His first EP, Cave Country, was released in December 2008, followed by Cave Country Part 2, which was released in August 2009. His debut album, Synesthesia, was released in May 2010. His second album, Seven Rages of Man, was released in May 2012.

=== Acting ===
While studying at Coleg Gwent, Crosskeys, David-Lloyd appeared in various local stage productions at the Dolman Theatre in Newport and the Sherman Theatre in Cardiff. David-Lloyd went on to train at the National Youth Theatre before moving to Reading to pursue his acting career with The Rep College. David-Lloyd's parts have included Sebastian in Twelfth Night on stage.

In the 2004 comedy/drama Mine All Mine, written by Torchwood creator Russell T Davies, he played a character named Ianto Jones. In 2005, David-Lloyd began a part-time degree in philosophy and psychological studies with the Open University.

=== Torchwood ===
David-Lloyd returned to Wales for the filming of his first regular television role in 2006 for Doctor Who spin-off Torchwood, in which he played Ianto Jones, a member of the fictional Torchwood Institute. David-Lloyd appeared in three of four series of Torchwood and even made an appearance in the Doctor Who series 4 finale episodes "The Stolen Earth" and "Journey's End". David-Lloyd has also recorded a Torchwood audio book, The Sin Eaters, and appeared in the Torchwood audio dramas Lost Souls, Asylum, Golden Age, The Dead Line, The Lost Files, and The House of the Dead. David-Lloyd has recorded a number of M.R. James ghost stories titled Tales of the Supernatural.

Since 2015, he has reprised the role of Ianto Jones in several Torchwood audio plays for Big Finish Productions and has also written some of the scripts for those releases.

=== After Torchwood ===
In 2009, he appeared in the short comedy film A Very British Cover-up, while also appearing as a police detective in Internet crime thriller, Girl Number Nine, also starring Tracy-Ann Oberman, premiering online on 30 October 2009.

In 2010 David-Lloyd appeared in an episode of the long-running ITV series The Bill, first aired on 21 January 2010. He also appeared as Dr. John Watson in 2010 direct-to-DVD film Sherlock Holmes by The Asylum. He appeared in the pantomime Cinderella at the Charter Theatre Preston, playing the character of Prince Charming.

David-Lloyd also appeared in Casimir Effect, an independent short feature, starring as Dr. Robert Cameron. This film began shooting in early 2010 and was released on 12 December 2011. The production company has said this is a proof of concept which will see Casimir Effect developed into a TV series.

In June 2011, David-Lloyd appeared as a main character in the Syfy movie Red Faction: Origins based on the video games. Later in 2011, David-Lloyd appeared in a season 3 episode of the SyFy show Warehouse 13 titled "3...2...1..." as an agent of Warehouse 12 in the 1890s, partnered with H. G. Wells.

On 30 October 2012, David-Lloyd began appearing on Holby City as Rhys Hopkins, a role he played until January 2013.

In November 2018, David-Lloyd began appearing on BBC One medical drama Casualty as Joshua Bowers.

He is the voice of Solas in the Dragon Age games.

== Personal life ==
David-Lloyd married Gemma James in 2010. The couple have a daughter, Lily, and a son, Eli. David-Lloyd uses he/they pronouns.

== Filmography ==
Year(s)	Title	Role	More information
2003	Absolute Power	Terry Pine	1 episode; "Pope Idol"
2003	Casualty	Darrell Kemner	1 episode; "I Got It Bad And That Ain't Good"
2004	The Bill	Carl Pritchard	1 episode; "367"
2004	Rosemary and Thyme	Zack Pitt-Seymour	1 episode; "The Gongoozlers"
2004	Mine All Mine	Yanto Jones	Series 1, Episode 5
2005	The Genius of Beethoven	Karl van Beethoven	1 episode; "Faith and Fury"
2006–2009	Torchwood	Ianto Jones	Series regular
2006–2009	Torchwood Declassified	Himself	Series regular
2008	Doctor Who	Ianto Jones	2 episodes; "The Stolen Earth", "Journey's End"
2008	Kaleidoscope Hardcore	Himself	Short
2009	A Very British Cover-up	Brian Jones	Short Film
2009	Caerdydd	Dylan	2 episodes; #4.4 and #4.5
2009	Torchwood: Inside the Hub	Himself	
2009	Girl Number 9	Matheson	Web series
2010	The Bill	Jeremy Preston	1 episode; "Duty Calls"
2010	Sherlock Holmes	Dr. John Watson	Film
2011	Red Faction: Origins	Commander Adam Hale	Television film
2011	Warehouse 13	Mr. Wolcott	1 episode; "3...2...1"
2011	Bloody Norah	PC Evans	1 episode
2011	Casimir Effect	Dr. Robert Cameron	Actor and producer
2012, 2017	Twisted Showcase	Peter/Paul	Web Series; Actor - Episode "Peter and Paul"; Director and Co-Writer - Episode "Be My Head"
2012—2013	Holby City	Rhys Hopkins	3 episodes
2015	Waterloo Road	Rob Hutchinson	3 episodes
2015	I Am Alone	Jacob Fitts	
2016	Tale of a Timelord	Ianto Jones	Short
2016	Dark Signal	Ben Evans	Film
2018	Albert: The Power Behind Victoria	Prince Albert	Television film
2018	Robin Hood: The Rebellion	Green	Film
2018–2019	Casualty	Joshua Bowers	Recurring role
2018	Black River Meadow	David	
2019	Warren	Matt Dad	Post-production
2024	Moths	Dad	Coleg Gwent
2025	The Witcher	Captain Mordial	

== Video games ==
Year	Title	Role	Notes
2011	Red Faction: Armageddon	Adam Hale	Voice
2014	Dragon Age: Inquisition	Solas	Voice
2015	Dragon Age: Inquisition – Trespasser	Solas	Voice
2019	Du Lac & Fey: Dance of Death	Lancelot Du Lac	Voice
2024	Dragon Age: The Veilguard	Solas	Voice
