= Small Worlds (Torchwood) =

2006 Torchwood episode

05 – "Small Worlds"
- Torchwood episode
- A "Fairy"

Cast
- Starring: John Barrowman – Captain Jack Harkness; Eve Myles – Gwen Cooper; Burn Gorman – Owen Harper; Naoko Mori – Toshiko Sato; Gareth David-Lloyd – Ianto Jones
- Others: Kai Owen – Rhys Williams; Eve Pearce – Estelle; Lara Philippart – Jasmine; Adrienne O'Sullivan – Lynn; William Travis – Roy; Roger Barclay – Goodson; Heledd Baskerville – Kate; Ffion Wilkins – WPC; Nathan Sussex – Custody Sergeant; Paul Jones – Man in Street; Sophie Davies, Victoria Gourley – Bullies

Production
- Directed by: Alice Troughton
- Written by: Peter J. Hammond
- Script editor: Brian Minchin
- Produced by: Richard Stokes; Chris Chibnall (co-producer)
- Executive producers: Russell T Davies; Julie Gardner
- Music by: Ben Foster
- Production code: 1.5
- Series: Series 1
- Running time: 50 mins
- First broadcast: 12 November 2006

Chronology
← Preceded by "Cyberwoman"	Followed by → "Countrycide"

"Small Worlds" is the fifth episode of the first series of the British science fiction television series Torchwood, which was originally broadcast on the digital television channel BBC Three on 12 November 2006.

The episode involves the alien hunters Torchwood investigating a group of deadly fairies who intend to turn the Cardiff child Jasmine Pierce (Lara Phillipart) into a fairy.

Filming took place in the villages of Radyr and Pentyrch in Cardiff North.

== Plot ==
Jack is invited to a presentation on fairies held by his former lover Estelle, and brings Gwen along. Estelle shows the audience the Cottingley Fairies photographs, then compares them to photographs she had taken a couple of nights before. Jack and Estelle later discuss the photographs and the nature of fairies at her home. On the way back to the Torchwood Hub, Jack explains to Gwen that the fairies are creatures from the dawn of time and are not bound by linear time. He says that the fairies can be very dangerous. Jack instructs Toshiko to watch for strange weather patterns in the area in order to locate the fairies.

Meanwhile, a paedophile called Mark Goodson tries to abduct a young girl called Jasmine while she is walking home. He retreats after a strong wind appears and he hears ethereal voices. Still hearing the voices, Goodson stumbles through the Cardiff market, and starts to cough up rose petals. He gets himself arrested to seek the safety of a jail cell. However, he is found the next day dead by asphyxiation. Torchwood arrive and find Goodson's mouth filled with rose petals. Jack confirms that fairies, which he encountered before, murdered Goodson as part of their protection of a "Chosen One", a child that will soon become the fairies' if Torchwood cannot find her in time. Late at night, the fairies kill Estelle by drowning her with a localised rainstorm. Torchwood understand that the fairies are becoming more protective and aggressive.

The fairies cause a large gale to sweep over Jasmine's school the next day, traumatising two girls that were bullying Jasmine. Torchwood find out from Jasmine's teacher that the only one not affected by the storm was Jasmine, confirming she is the Chosen One. Meanwhile, Jasmine's mother Lynn and her boyfriend Roy are holding a party in their garden. When Jasmine goes outside she finds that Roy fenced off the garden to prevent her from going to the woods. Jasmine bites Roy, and Roy slaps her. The fairies appear and kill Roy. Jasmine and the fairies race off to the woods. Jack tries to convince the fairies not to take her away. They refuse, stating that she is their Chosen One and if she is prevented from going many more people will die. Admitting he has no other choice, and assured Jasmine will not be harmed, Jack lets Jasmine go.

== Continuity ==
- Although Jack claims that he does not sleep in "Ghost Machine", he is shown to have a waking nightmare in this episode.
- A pair of 3-D glasses, originally used by the Tenth Doctor in "Doomsday", can be seen hanging on a lamp shade on Jack's desk at the start of the episode.
- This is the first episode that explores Jack's past. At one point, he was in charge of a troop of 15 men in 1909 Lahore. A letter on the Torchwood website, dated 1908, appears to suggest that this was part of a diamond mining scam during his conman days.
- Jack's philosophy of sacrificing one person to save a much larger group would later be explored in Children of Earth.

== Production ==
=== Cast notes ===
- Lara Phillipart, who plays Jasmine in this episode, appears as a member of Tommy's family in the Doctor Who episode "The Idiot's Lantern".

== Outside references ==
- The primary school is called "Coed y Garreg", which translates as "The Stone Woods", a possible reference to the Roundstone Woods seen at the beginning of the episode.
- The discussion about Sir Arthur Conan Doyle's involvement in the Cottingley Fairies hoax is based upon real events that occurred near Bradford in West Yorkshire, England from 1917 onwards and based around two young girls who had taken photographs of what they claimed to be fairies. Doyle was apparently convinced of their veracity. The mention of Harry Houdini's involvement, however, is not historically accurate. While Conan Doyle did send a letter to the skeptical Houdini about the fairy "discovery", Houdini did not respond or use the event for self-promotion as suggested in the show. The image seen on the show is very slightly altered, with Jasmine's face over one of the fairies.
