= Maxine Evans =

Welsh actress

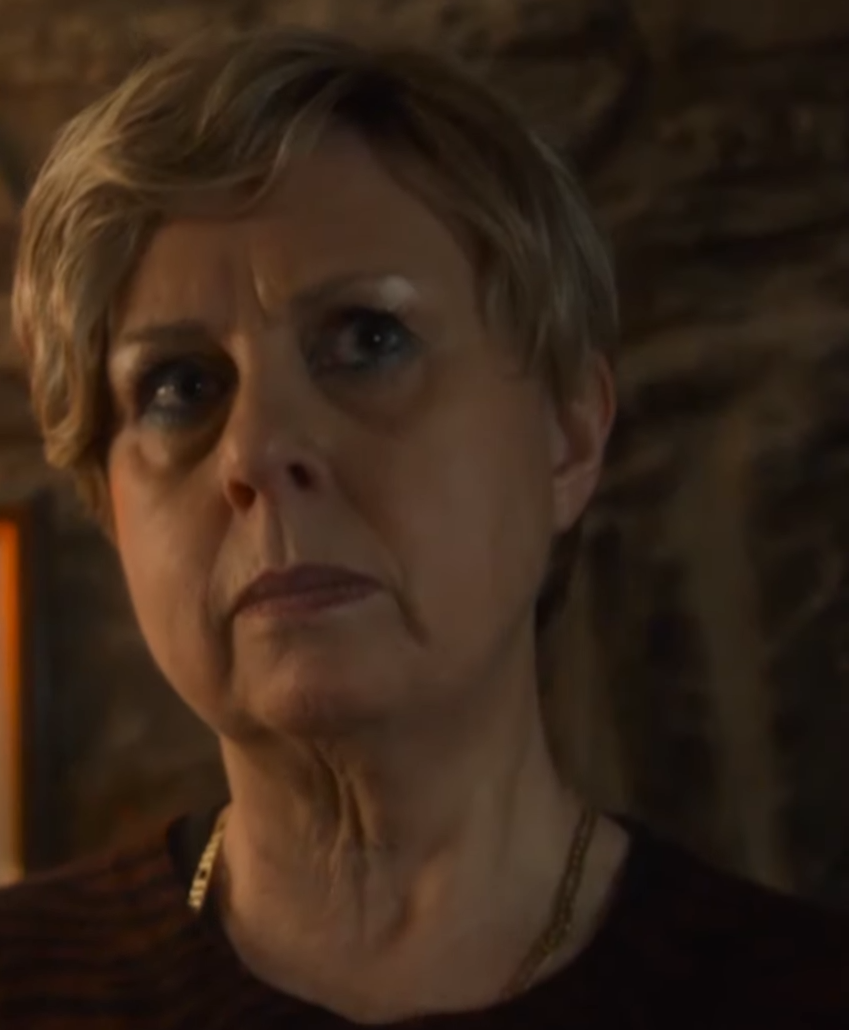
- Evans in the 2024 Doctor Who episode 73 Yards
- Born: Maxine Evans; 9 November 1966 (age 59); Wales
- Occupations: Actress, theatre director, TV director, photographer, writer
- Years active: 1996–present
- Spouse: Neil Docking

Maxine Evans is a Welsh actress who has worked extensively in television and theatre roles. She is best known for playing Rhian in the Sky1 TV comedy drama series Stella. and is also well known for appearing in Torchwood, as Helen Sherman in the episode "Countrycide". Evans also played the character of Mrs Busby in the BBC drama Call The Midwife

Evans' career as a director started on stage at the Glasgow Tron Theatre in 1996. A play by Sharman Macdonald was underway, when the director was unable to continue Maxine was drafted from actor to actor/director to get the show to the opening night. Two years later Maxine directed her first Short Film, in which she was nominated for Best Director at the Cork Film Festival. A year later she started directing for television on the drama Nuts and Bolts. She had started as script writer and head story-liner on the show the year before when it won a Royal Television Society Award. She continued to storyline, write and direct over the shows next three series.

During her last year on Nuts and Bolts, Evans was asked to take over as the series editor on Crossroads. Eight months later she moved into the story office of Coronation Street.

She has also directed a musical feature film Rain: An Original Musical. She worked on the YouTube comedy soap Storyline as director/producer. In theatre, her Olivier-nominated production of The Revlon Girl first enjoyed sell out runs at the Edinburgh Festival and London, receiving the 2018 Offie for "Best New Play", followed by being nominated for the 2018 Olivier Awards for Outstanding Achievement.

== Early life and training ==
Maxine Evans was born 9 November 1966 in Wales and grew up in the village of Seven Sisters. Maxine was a member of the West Glamorgan Youth Theatre and the National Youth Theatre of Wales, where she acted alongside Ruth Jones. Maxine went on to study at the Guildhall School of Music and Drama, where one of her classmates was Daniel Craig, who later played James Bond, .

== Career ==
In 2006 Evans had a role in the Doctor Who spin-off Torchwood, appearing in the episode "Countrycide" as Helen Sherman, a cannibal who lived in the Brecon Beacons with her husband Evan Sherman, portrayed by Owen Teale, who worked alongside Evan and other villagers to get those passing by ready for harvest.

In the Sky1 TV Series Stella, she plays the part of Rhian, who pushes a dog around in a pram and hasn't had a shower for some time. She was at school with Stella and already has seven grandchildren, despite being only 42.

She also appeared as a semi regular character Mrs Busby in the BBC drama Call The Midwife.

She has also worked extensively behind the camera too. First writing, directing and as the head story-liner on the Royal Television Society Awards winning Welsh drama Nuts and Bolts. She went on to be the series editor on Crossroads and story-liner on Coronation Street.

Evans's production of The Revlon Girl written by Neil Docking received the 2018 Offie for "Best New Play", followed by nomination for the 2018 Olivier Award for Outstanding Achievement.

== Personal life ==
Maxine met her husband Neil Docking while still at Youth Theatre in South Wales. She has no children of her own and talks about her struggles with infertility

She talks about how she is over the moon of the role she has in Stella, in which she plays a 42-year-old grandmother of seven: "I have two Staffordshire bull terriers that I love to pieces so I was overjoyed when I found out that the dog that I push around in a pram is a staff".

=== Film and television ===
Year	Title	Character	Production	Notes
1996	The Bill	Junior Casualty Officer	BBC One	Starring in one episode
1997	London's Burning	Mrs. Perry	ITV	Starring in one episode
1997	The Sherman Plays	Maeve	HTV Wales	Starring in one episode
2003-2022	Casualty	Mrs. Morton/Gaynor Gowan	BBC One	Starring in one episode in 2003 and then appearing as a different recurring character in 2022
2003	Canterbury Tales	Mrs Preston	BBC	Starring in one episode
2005	Goal! The Dream Begins	The Cleaner 2	Unknown	Unknown
2005	Holby City	Sally Price-Thomas	BBC One	Starring in one episode
2006	Torchwood	Helen Sherman	BBC One	Starring in one episode: Countrycide
2006	Perfect Parents	Teacher	ITV Productions	Unknown
2008	Caught in the Act	Gina	Carnaby Pictures	Unknown
2004–2012	Doctors	Christine Langford/Ruby Southall	BBC One	Starring in two episodes with two different roles
2012	EastEnders	Beryl Barr	BBC One	Starring in one episode
2012–2017	Stella	Rhian Evans	Sky 1	Main Cast
2013	Agatha Christie's Poirot	Mrs. Buckle	ITV	Starring in one episode
2015	A Song for Jenny	Pauline	BBC	
2015–16	Call the Midwife	Mrs Busby	BBC One	
2022	Why Didn't They Ask Evans?	Mrs Bowden	ITV	Starring in one episode
2024	Doctor Who	Lowri Palin	BBC One	Starring in one episode
