= From Out of the Rain =

2008 Torchwood episode

23 – "From Out of the Rain"
- Torchwood episode
- One of the Night Travellers steps out of the film, into reality.

Cast
- Starring: John Barrowman – Captain Jack Harkness; Eve Myles – Gwen Cooper; Burn Gorman – Owen Harper; Naoko Mori – Toshiko Sato; Gareth David-Lloyd – Ianto Jones
- Others: Julian Bleach – Ghostmaker; Camilla Power – Pearl; Craig Gallivan – Jonathan; Gerard Carey – Greg; Stephen Marzella – Dave Penn; Hazel Wyn Williams – Faith Penn; Lowri Sian Jones – Nettie; Eileen Essell – Christina; Anwen Carlisle – Restaurant Owner; Caroline Sheen – Nurse; Yasmin Wilde – Senior Nurse; Lisa Winston – Mother; Gaia Davies – Daughter; Alastair Sill, Catherine Olding – Couple in Car; Tom Langford – Young Boy

Production
- Directed by: Jonathan Fox Bassett
- Written by: Peter J. Hammond
- Script editor: Brian Minchin
- Produced by: Richard Stokes; Chris Chibnall (co-producer)
- Executive producers: Russell T Davies; Julie Gardner
- Music by: Ben Foster
- Production code: 2.10
- Series: Series 2
- Running time: 45 mins
- First broadcast: 19 March 2008

Chronology
← Preceded by "Something Borrowed"	Followed by → "Adrift"

"From Out of the Rain" is the tenth episode of the second series of the British science fiction television series Torchwood. It was broadcast on BBC Three on 12 March 2008, and repeated on BBC Two one week later. In the episode, the Ghostmaker (Julian Bleach), the leader of a travelling show, breaks out of the celluloid film he is trapped inside, and steals the last breaths of nearby residents in Cardiff to use as his audience.

== Plot ==
The local Cardiff cinema the Electro plays old celluloid films to display its local history. A black-and-white film of a travelling company seems to take a life of its own, restarting itself in the film projector and preventing the projector from being turned off for a period of time. Two figures from the film, the troupe's leader the Ghostmaker and a woman called Pearl, step out of the projection screen and become real, disappearing onto the streets of Cardiff. In the Hub, Torchwood review the footage. Ianto, who watched the screening, notices the absence of two performers. Jack recalls stories of the Night Travellers, who performed only at night, and usually when some local residents have gone missing. This story is corroborated by Christina, an old woman at a nursing home who witnessed the Night Travellers take her family away, and said that they came "from out of the rain".

Meanwhile, the Ghostmaker and Pearl prey on innocent victims, drawing their last breath into a silver flask, and leaving them with no saliva or tears, and close to death. The Ghostmaker releases more of his companions from the film to regain their audience and begin travelling again like the old days. Jack surmises that if they were released from the film, they could be captured by it as well using a home movie camera. Torchwood rush back to the theatre as the Ghostmaker is releasing the others from the film and is able to use a camera to confine the Night Travellers; Jack then rips open the camera and exposes the film to sunlight. In a last fit of revenge, the Ghostmaker opens the silver flask and throws it into the air. Ianto catches and closes it quickly, but is too late to save all but one victim. Torchwood restores the breath to the last victim, a young boy, and the silver flask is stowed away back at Torchwood. Though the rest of the team believe the threat is over, Jack surmises there may be more reels of the Night Travellers.

== Production ==
=== Cast and credits notes ===
- The episodic title credits were missing in the BBC HD broadcast of this episode.
- Julian Bleach, who plays the Ghostmaker, was later cast as Davros, the creator of the Daleks, in the 2008 Doctor Who episodes "The Stolen Earth" and "Journey's End".
- Gerard Carey received a closing credit as Greg, a character from the earlier episode, "Meat", but neither the actor nor his character appeared in this episode.
