= Ghost Machine (Torchwood) =

2006 Torchwood episode

03 – "Ghost Machine"
- Torchwood episode

Cast
- Starring: John Barrowman – Captain Jack Harkness; Eve Myles – Gwen Cooper; Burn Gorman – Owen Harper; Naoko Mori – Toshiko Sato; Gareth David-Lloyd – Ianto Jones
- Others: Kai Owen – Rhys Williams; Gareth Thomas – Ed Morgan; Ben McKay – Bernie; Llinos Daniel – Eleri; John Normington – Tom Flanagan; Emily Evans – Lizzie Lewis; Christopher Elson – Young Ed Morgan; Christopher Greene – Young Tom Flanagan; Julie Gibbs – Bernie's Mum; Ian Kay – Snooker Player; Ryan Conway – Kid in arcade; Kathryn Howard – Woman in shop

Production
- Directed by: Colin Teague
- Written by: Helen Raynor
- Script editor: Brian Minchin
- Produced by: Richard Stokes; Chris Chibnall (co-producer)
- Executive producers: Russell T Davies; Julie Gardner
- Music by: Murray Gold; Ben Foster
- Production code: 1.3
- Series: Series 1
- Running time: 48 mins
- First broadcast: 29 October 2006

Chronology
← Preceded by "Day One"	Followed by → "Cyberwoman"

"Ghost Machine" is the third episode of the first series of the British science fiction television series Torchwood, which was broadcast on the digital television channel BBC Three on 29 October 2006.

Set in Cardiff, the episode involves a group of alien hunters called Torchwood discovering an alien machine that shows visions of strong emotional events from the past and future.

== Plot ==
Jack, Owen, and Gwen, pursue Bernie Harris, a petty thief carrying something emitting an alien signal in his jacket, through the Cardiff streets. Gwen chases Bernie into a train station, and is able to grab his jacket but he gets out of it and runs away. Gwen discovers an alien device in the jacket pocket, and when she activates it, she sees a vision of a lost boy called Tom Flanagan wandering the train station in 1941.

Torchwood try to find Bernie in Splott. Unsuccessful, they return to the train station to try the device again when Owen activates it while under a bridge. He witnesses Ed Morgan rape and murder Lizzie Lewis in 1963. In the Hub, Toshiko investigates the crime to confirm what Owen saw, and finds that no one was charged for Lizzie's murder. The Hub's computer analyses that the nanotechnology of the "quantum transducer" allows people to see moments of the past spurred by strong human emotions.

Owen confronts the elderly Ed on his own but gets no information out of him; however, upon leaving his house, he spots Bernie and takes Bernie to a pub to learn more about the device while the rest of Torchwood is en route. Bernie explains he found the device in a tin of random objects from an old lady, and that he too saw the murder of Lizzie, and wonders if the team wants the "other half". Torchwood follows Bernie back to Bernie's home to retrieve the other half as well as the other alien objects. Bernie explains that he only used the other half once, as it showed him bleeding to death outside his home at his current age. As they leave, Gwen accidentally triggers the second half, and has a vision of herself holding a bloody knife, calling out to Owen.

Torchwood realise that Ed is being blackmailed by Bernie; Jack becomes concerned that Owen may have triggered Ed to take action. Learning that Ed has left his home and is heading towards Bernie's, Owen disarms Ed and takes his knife. Determined not to let Ed get away with his crime, he decides to avenge Lizzie's death. He is stopped by Gwen, who takes his knife. Ed runs and impales himself on his own knife. Gwen sees that this is the future she saw. Jack locks the device away.

== Continuity ==
- The circled "P" emblem of the Preachers from the Doctor Who episode "Rise of the Cybermen" can be seen as faded graffiti on rusty bins outside Bernie's flat.
- As Owen flips through his various fake ID cards, one can be seen for UNIT.
- An 1886 letter on the Torchwood Institute website suggests that Owen is not the first member of the institute to feel personally involved with a case.
- The explanation Jack gives for the ghosts matches the one Sarah Jane Smith would later give in "Eye of the Gorgon", an episode of The Sarah Jane Adventures.
- Gwen uses the ghost machine to trigger memories of previous happy times with Rhys. One memory depicts them preparing to leave for Gwen's mother's sixtieth birthday party. Gwen's mother, Mary Cooper, is later introduced in the series two episode "Something Borrowed".

== Production ==
=== Cast notes ===
- Gareth Thomas was best known for his role as Roj Blake in the science fiction series Blake's 7 and also appeared in the Doctor Who audio play Storm Warning. John Normington previously appeared in the Doctor Who serials The Caves of Androzani and The Happiness Patrol.
