= Neil Docking =

British writer, composer and producer

Neil Docking is a British writer, composer and producer who has worked in press, radio, film, theatre and television.

A self-taught pianist and musician, he began his career playing in bars and clubs in his native Wales before studying at the University of Westminster where he began writing articles for the students' union magazine ('The Smoke'). In 1997 The Guardian published some of his work and approached him to write a fictional column about student life (intended as a parody of Bridget Jones's Diary) and soon 'Neil Docking's Diary' – a semi-satirical portrait of university life – appeared in the newspaper. In spite of some complaints about the portrayal of students, Docking was nominated for Feature Writer of the Year at the Guardian/NUS Media Awards in 1997.

Following graduation, Docking moved briefly into music journalism before penning a short film script, Without a Song or a Dance (which he later also scored) intended to be considered by Elton John's newly established Rocket Pictures. It was rejected but was eventually produced by BBC Wales (dir. Maxine Evans). The film opened the door for further script writing work first on the BBC Radio serial Station Road and then on the television series Nuts and Bolts for ITV1 Wales. He later worked as a writer, script doctor, storyliner and story editor on such long running British television shows such as Crossroads, Emmerdale (ITV) and Casualty (BBC). In 2012 he wrote the screenplay and music score for an independent feature film musical Summertime (retitled 'Rain'), directed by Maxine Evans.

In 2001, Neil Docking was shortlisted for the Dennis Potter Screenwriting Award.
