= Peter J. Hammond =

British screenwriter and novelist (born 1934)

- Born: 1934 (age 91–92)
- Other name: P. J. Hammond
- Occupations: Screenwriter and novelist
- Years active: 1963/1964–present

Peter J. Hammond (born 1934), sometimes credited as P. J. Hammond, is a British screenwriter and novelist.

== Career ==
Hammond started as a postal worker and lorry driver. His television career began in the 1960s when he began working on BBC police dramas such as Dixon of Dock Green and Z-Cars, on the latter of which he served as script editor for a year from 1969 to 1970. In 1970 he also wrote for the fantasy series Ace of Wands, and in the late 1980s contributed to the soap opera Emmerdale Farm. He also continued to write for crime and police dramas, penning episodes of The Sweeney. He also created the offbeat 1984 sitcom Lame Ducks.

In the 1980s and 1990s, Hammond wrote for popular ITV police/detective shows The Gentle Touch, The Bill and Wycliffe, as well as for Doctor Finlay, the new production of the 1960s BBC series Dr. Finlay's Casebook. He returned to the science fiction genre by writing an episode of the 1998 Sky One series Space Island One, although his episode was ultimately one of those that went untransmitted until 2002.

Work in the 2000s included many episodes of the popular murder mystery series Midsomer Murders.

=== Sapphire & Steel ===
P.J. Hammond is best known for the creation of the science-fiction fantasy series Sapphire & Steel, produced by ATV and screened on the ITV network in the UK from 1979 to 1982. Hammond, who had conceived the series after spending an evening in a supposedly haunted house, wrote five of the six serials that made up the programme, as well as a novelisation of the first serial.

=== Doctor Who and spin-offs ===
In 1986, Hammond was approached to write for Doctor Who, during the troubled production of Season 23's The Trial of a Time Lord. His story, titled Paradise Five, was liked by then-script editor Eric Saward, but rejected by the producer John Nathan-Turner while the script was still being worked on. The script was later revived in 2009–2010 by Big Finish Productions for a full cast audio drama, Paradise 5, with the final script written by both Hammond and new material by Andy Lane, starring the Sixth Doctor (Colin Baker) and his companion Peri Brown (Nicola Bryant). Paradise 5 was one of eight stories made as part of the first "Lost Stories" season featuring several commissioned, but never filmed, scripts.

In October 2005, it was announced by the BBC Press Office that Hammond would be one of the writers of the new science fiction crime series Torchwood, a spin-off from the popular BBC One show Doctor Who. His episode, "Small Worlds", was shown on 12 November 2006, directly opposite one of his Midsomer Murders scripts, "Dance with the Dead", on ITV1. He also wrote the episode "From Out of the Rain" for the second series of Torchwood, shown on BBC Three on 12 March 2008.

== Novel ==
In 2018 Hammond released his first novel, Downtimers.

== Writing credits ==
Production	Notes	Broadcaster
Thirty-Minute Theatre	"The Far-Way Incident" (1966)	BBC2
Ramshackle Road	Television film (1968)	BBC1
Adventure Weekly	"Explosion" (1969)	BBC1
Z-Cars	33 episodes (1969–1975, 1978)	BBC1
Manhunt	"Machine" (1970)	ITV
Trial	"Peggy" (1971); "On the Evidence You Will Hear" (1971)	BBC2
Six Days of Justice	"Open House" (1972)	ITV
Villains	"Chas" (1972)	ITV
The Hole in the Wall	7 episodes (1972)	BBC1
Ace of Wands	13 episodes (1972)	ITV
Hunter's Walk	"Behaviour" (1973); "Discretion" (1973)	ITV
Crime of Passion	"Henri" (1973)	ITV
Armchair Theatre	"The Square Root of Three" (1973)	ITV
Oranges & Lemons	"A Funny Kind of Joke" (1973)	ITV
New Scotland Yard	"Pier" (1973); "Comeback" (1974)	ITV
Spy Trap	"Salvage" (1973); "A Nice Place to Live" (1975)	BBC1
Dixon of Dock Green	"Cat-Walk" (1974)	BBC1
Within These Walls	"Guessing Game" (1974); "Playground" (1975); "Windows" (1975); "Vacuum" (1976); "Raft" (1978)	ITV
Special Branch	"Diversion" (1974)	ITV
Dial M for Murder	"The Vineyard" (1974)	BBC1
Rooms	"Arthur and Rowena" (1975)	ITV
Angels	"Interim" (1975); "Celebration" (1976); "Signals" (1976); "Values" (1978)	BBC1
Couples	7 episodes (1976)	ITV
The Sweeney	"Pay Off" (1976)	ITV
The Professionals	"Heroes" (1978)	ITV
Crown Court	"Association: Part 1" (1978); "Code: Part 1" (1978)	ITV
Shadows	"And Now for My Next Trick..." (1978)	ITV
Target	"The Run" (1978)	BBC1
Hazell	"Hazell and Hyde" (1979)	ITV
Sapphire & Steel	34 episodes, 28 as writer, 6 as "creator" (1979–1982)	ITV
The Gentle Touch	6 episodes (1982–1984)	ITV
Lame Ducks	12 episodes (1984–1985)	BBC2
Unnatural Causes	"Lost Property" (1986)	ITV
Emmerdale Farm	"Episode #1.1261" (1988)	ITV
The Bill	39 episodes (1988–1998, 2004)	ITV
EastEnders	"Episode #1.548" (1990)	BBC1
Perfect Scoundrels	"Party Games" (1992); "Last of the Few" (1992)	ITV
Doctor Finlay	"Childsplay" (1994); "Secrecy" (1994)	ITV
Dangerfield	"Tricks" (1996); "Eden" (1996); "Still Waters" (1996); "Games" (1996)	BBC1
Wycliffe	"Strangers Home" (1997); "Time Out" (1998)	ITV
Space Island One	"Lost Property" (1998)	Sky One
The Ruth Rendell Mysteries	"The Lake of Darkness" (1999)	ITV
Midsomer Murders	"Dark Autumn" (2001); "Death and Dreams" (2003); "Bad Tidings" (2004); "Things That Go Bump in the Night" (2004); "Dead Letters" (2006); "Dance with the Dead" (2006); "Small Mercies" (2009); "The Silent Land" (2010); "Echoes of the Dead" (2011)	ITV
Torchwood	"Small Worlds" (2006); "From Out of the Rain" (2008)	BBC Three
