= Countrycide =

2006 Torchwood episode

06 – "Countrycide"
- Torchwood episode
- Ianto and Tosh discover the human meat.

Cast
- Starring: John Barrowman – Captain Jack Harkness; Eve Myles – Gwen Cooper; Burn Gorman – Owen Harper; Naoko Mori – Toshiko Sato; Gareth David-Lloyd – Ianto Jones
- Others: Kai Owen – Rhys Williams; Owen Teale – Evan Sherman; Maxine Evans – Helen Sherman; Calum Callaghan – Kieran; Rhys ap Trefor – Huw; Emily Bowker – Ellie; Robert Barton – Martin

Production
- Directed by: Andy Goddard
- Written by: Chris Chibnall
- Script editor: Brian Minchin
- Produced by: Richard Stokes; Chris Chibnall (co-producer)
- Executive producer(s): Russell T Davies; Julie Gardner
- Music by: Murray Gold; Ben Foster
- Production code: 1.6
- Series: Series 1
- Running time: 50 mins
- First broadcast: 19 November 2006

Chronology
← Preceded by "Small Worlds"	Followed by → "Greeks Bearing Gifts"

"Countrycide" is the sixth episode of the first series of the British science fiction television series Torchwood, which was originally broadcast on the digital television channel BBC Three on 19 November 2006.

Set in a small Welsh village, the episode involves a village full of cannibals harvesting and butchering passing travellers every ten years.

It was viewed by 1.22 million people.

== Plot ==
Torchwood responds to reports of 17 people missing within a 20-mile radius in the Brecon Beacons, using the mobile phone signal from the last disappearance as their starting point. While getting some firewood for the camp, Gwen and Owen encounter two hooded figures. They chase the figures but instead find a corpse. As the team investigates it, their SUV is stolen. Ianto tracks the vehicle to a nearby village; Jack believes the corpse was a lure to make them come to the village.

Jack, Gwen, and Owen search the pub and nearby homes, finding two more corpses. They also find a young man, Kieran, who accidentally shoots Gwen with a shotgun, believing "they" came back for him. They learn about the victims from Kieran, still unsure whether they are dealing with aliens. Suddenly the lights go out and movement comes from both the cellar and outside the pub. Kieran is dragged away, and Gwen and Owen try to follow him, against Jack's orders. Jack interrogates Martin, the man he shot from the cellar.

Toshiko and Ianto attempt to find the SUV, but are captured and awaken in a cellar full of old clothes and shoes, and a refrigerator full of human body parts; Toshiko realises they are to be food. A scared woman named Helen enters the room holding a shotgun, and learns from them of the other Torchwood members, then tells them that she cannot help them; she is collecting them for the "Harvest" that happens every ten years. They are taken into a kitchen filled with body parts and corpses. Helen is revealed to be one of the cannibals as a man named Evan handcuffs them to be butchered. Ianto headbutts Evan, allowing Toshiko to escape into the woods. Evan catches up to Toshiko and strangles her, but Owen and Gwen arrive with a policeman named Huw. Huw reveals himself to be Evan's nephew, and the two lead the Torchwood members back to the village.

Just before Ianto is cut open and bled, Jack bursts through the building on a tractor and wounds the assembled cannibals with a shotgun. They spare Evan's life to try to learn the truth: every ten years, the village targets travellers and butchers them. When Gwen demands to know why, Evan claims it makes him happy. The villagers are taken into custody by the police.
