= Adrift (Torchwood) =

2008 Torchwood episode

24 – "Adrift"
- Torchwood episode
- Gwen compiles a list of missing people. Chris Chibnall stated that "the issue of loss" was the driving force behind the story.

Cast
- Starring: John Barrowman – Captain Jack Harkness; Eve Myles – Gwen Cooper; Burn Gorman – Owen Harper; Naoko Mori – Toshiko Sato; Gareth David-Lloyd – Ianto Jones
- Others: Kai Owen – Rhys Williams; Tom Price – PC Andy; Ruth Jones – Nikki; Robert Pugh – Jonah; Lorna Gayle – Helen; Oliver Ferriman – Young Jonah

Production
- Directed by: Mark Everest
- Written by: Chris Chibnall
- Script editor: Lindsey Alford
- Produced by: Richard Stokes; Sophie Fante; Chris Chibnall (co-producer)
- Executive producers: Russell T Davies; Julie Gardner
- Music by: Ben Foster
- Production code: 2.11
- Series: Series 2
- Running time: 50 mins
- First broadcast: 21 March 2008

Chronology
← Preceded by "From Out of the Rain"	Followed by → "Fragments"

"Adrift" is the eleventh episode of the second series of the British science fiction television series Torchwood, which was first broadcast on BBC Three on 19 March 2008, and repeated on BBC Two two days later. The episode was written by series one and two head writer Chris Chibnall, directed by Mark Everest and produced by Sophie Fante and Richard Stokes. The episode featured the five initial series regulars John Barrowman, Eve Myles, Burn Gorman, Naoko Mori and Gareth David Lloyd plus recurring actors Kai Owen and Tom Price.

The episode begins with the alien hunter Gwen Cooper (Eve Myles) being called in to investigate a missing person case by her former colleague in the police Andy Davidson (Tom Price). When bereaved mother Nikki Bevan (Ruth Jones) starts a support group for missing people, Gwen realises the problem is widespread. She pursues the investigation against the wishes of her boss Jack Harkness (John Barrowman) and is able to track Nikki's son to an isolation facility. It is revealed that Nikki's son Jonah (Robert Pugh and Oliver Ferriman), like the other missing individuals around Cardiff, was taken by the space-time rift and returned physically and mentally scarred. After realising she cannot have a relationship with her son, Nikki implores Gwen not to reveal the truth to any other bereaved relative.

Chibnall wanted to write a story that tackled the issue of loss and revolved around a missing person case. Executive producer Russell T Davies appreciated the character dynamics and domestic themes in the episode and cited the script as one of his inspirations in continuing the series. Ruth Jones, who is generally better known for her comedic roles, was cast against type in the central guest role of Nikki Bevan. The episode was filmed largely on location in South Wales with the island of Flat Holm featuring prominently. Response to the episode was generally positive. Reviewers generally praised the episode for illuminating the conflicting elements of Gwen's character and providing a central dilemma with no easy answer. Some critics identified ostensible plot holes, though felt that the episode's emotional successes negated these.

== Plot ==
At the instigation of her former police colleague Andy Davidson, Torchwood agent Gwen is investigating Jonah Bevan's disappearance. After Jonah's mother Nikki starts a support group for relatives of missing people in the Cardiff area, Gwen realises that there are more cases resembling Jonah's disappearance. Gwen collates a chart of the missing people and her colleague Toshiko discovers that all the disappearances occurred during negative spikes of activity from the Cardiff Rift. Gwen and Toshiko postulate the implications of this: that the Rift can take people away and discard them elsewhere. Gwen confronts her boss Jack with her research but he repeatedly orders her to stop the investigation.

Gwen becomes consumed with the issue of the missing individuals and this takes its toll on her relationship with her husband Rhys. They argue, and he states that if Gwen is working to safeguard ordinary life then she has not been successful. Returning to Torchwood's Hub, Gwen is given a GPS device with coordinates to a hidden location by Ianto. The device leads Gwen to a facility on Flat Holm which is home to 17 individuals taken by the Rift who have returned. Gwen finds Jack there, and demands access to Jonah. An older Jonah has been physically deformed whilst on a burning planet in the midst of a burning solar system. Jack reveals that he set up the facility when he first took command of Torchwood, in order to care for the victims of the Rift, who had previously been locked away in the Torchwood vaults.

Gwen brings Nikki in to see Jonah under the supervision of a facility staff member. Nikki thinks about taking Jonah home to care for him herself. However, Jonah starts screaming horribly, the result of looking into the heart of a dark star, and necessitating that everyone leave his company. Gwen visits Nikki a week later, who implores her not to show the island to anyone else. At home that night Gwen prepares a romantic candle-lit dinner for Rhys who, realising that she is upset, insists that Gwen shares her burden.

== Production ==
"Adrift" was produced as part of its own production block: block seven. Filming of the episode was "double banked" with block five, which consisted of the episodes "From Out of the Rain" and "Fragments". This accounted for the lack of availability of some of the regular cast members. Unlike the rest of the episodes in the series, this episode was not solely produced by regular series Richard Stokes but by guest producer Sophie Fante. Discussing the premise of the story writer Chris Chibnall states that "the issue of loss" is what drives the narrative and that he had "always wanted to write a story about people who go missing". Director Mark Everest noted that "people go missing all the time" and that to tackle this theme was "a brave thing to do". Executive producer Russell T Davies felt it provided good drama to have a story that would also examine elements of "paranoia" and "fear" and "mistrust" between Gwen and Jack as result of her realising she does not know the full extent of his work within Torchwood. Davies later stated in his book The Writer's Tale that "Adrift" was one of the scripts that "paved the way" for the third series of the show; his intention being to write Torchwood characters as "real people" with "families, feuds, aches and pains". The episode underwent less rewriting than any other script from the first two series with the final version being essentially a second draft. Gwen was initially referred to by her husband's surname, Williams, but Eve Myles vetoed this idea as she believed that an independent professional woman would want to keep her maiden name. A change made in the editing of the episode was the cutting of a short scene hinting at a possible romance between Nikki and Andy. This scene is included in the deleted scenes included in the series two boxset.

Ruth Jones was cast in the central guest role of Nikki. The actress stated that she was both "excited" and "scared" to appear in the series as it was "a very serious role" and comedy had previously been her "comfort zone". Robert Pugh was cast as the aged and scarred version of Nikki's son Jonah. Richard Stokes estimated that the actor had to spend between two and two and a half hours in make-up in addition to a twelve-hour filming day to have prosthetics applied to create the appearance of scarring. Ruth Jones found the prosthetics to be "absolutely fantastic" and "very gruesome". The reveal of Jonah's Scream was initially going to be a wholly alien effect with Pugh just miming on set. However, Pugh was keen to give the scream a go. Everest states that in the final dub the scream was "tweaked" and "layers were added" although stated that the fundamental basis of it was Pugh "screaming his lungs out". Discussing the return of Andy, Stokes stated that it was always the plan for the production team to give the character greater focus in an episode due to his "comic value", whilst Eve Myles had joked it was her "personal mission" to get the character back.

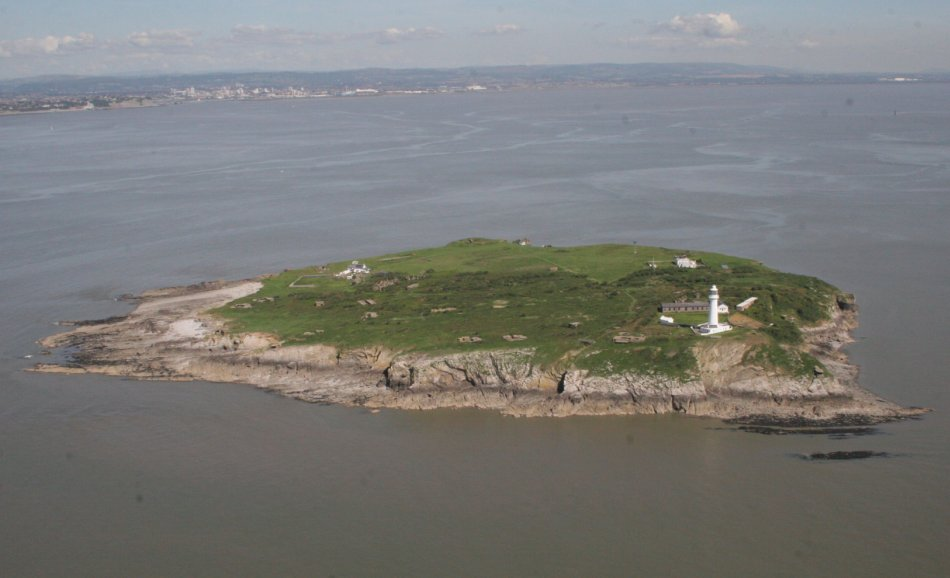
Flat Holm Island, which provided the location of a Torchwood isolation facility.

The episode was largely filmed on location around South Wales. Jonah's disappearance and Jack's subsequent investigation were filmed at the Cardiff Bay Barrage. The exteriors of Nikki's house were filmed at the Penarth Marina, whilst the scenes of the missing persons meeting were filmed at the Church of All Saints on Victoria Square, Penarth on 22 September 2007. The café sequences with Gwen and Andy were recorded in Fortes Café on Barry Island whilst the scene of Gwen and Rhys' picnic and argument were shot in Bute Park, Cardiff. The main location shoot for the episode was the island of Flat Holm in the Bristol Channel where exterior shots were filmed at the end of September. As the island does not allow vehicular access the production team were restricted in the filming equipment they could take on to the island. Though Flat Holm does possess a derelict cholera isolation hospital, the scenes of Torchwood's isolation facility were in fact filmed inside a Ministry of Defence building in Caldicot, Monmouthshire. Incidental music used included Richard Hawley's song "Serious" from his 2007 album Lady's Bridge and the song "Hard to Beat" by Hard-Fi from their album Stars of CCTV which are heard the first and second time Gwen and Andy meet in the café. Also used is the song "Other Side of the World" from KT Tunstall's album Eye to the Telescope which plays during a scene where Gwen brings Rhys breakfast.

== Broadcast and reception ==
"Adrift" was first broadcast on the digital channel BBC Three on 19 March 2008 at 10:00 pm. It received its first terrestrial broadcast two days later, 21 March, at 9:00 pm on BBC Two. A pre-watershed version of the episode was aired at 7:00 pm 25 March 2008. According to consolidated figures the episode's BBC Three broadcast was watched by 0.97 million viewers, its BBC Two debut by 2.52 million viewers and the pre-watershed version by 1.00 million viewers, amounting to an aggregated total of 4.49 million viewers across its three initial showings. The episode was also available to watch on the online catch up service BBC iPlayer, where it was the 16th most viewed individual broadcast between 1 January and 31 March 2008.

=== Critical reception ===
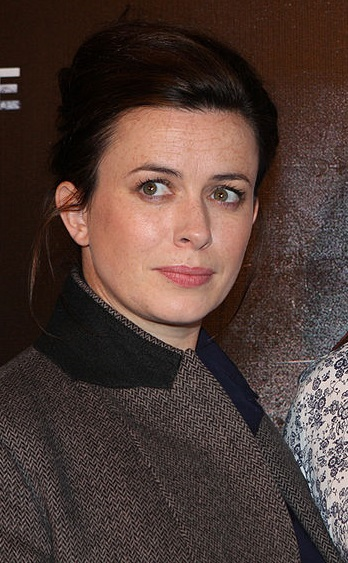
Gwen's central role in the episode, and Eve Myles' (pictured) performance were strongly praised by reviewers. A reporter from IGN called the episode "Gwen's best episode to date".

Ian Berriman of SFX rated the episode four and a half stars out of five and felt that it showed "how every SF-related casualty is more than just a statistic – it’s also someone’s life-destroying tragedy". He thought the episode had a few logic gaps but that the emotional focus was enough to distract the audience from this. He felt that the sequence where Gwen's husband Rhys "tears a strip off Gwen, then reminds her what Torchwood is fighting for" was the episode's highlight. Ben Rawson-Jones of Digital Spy stated that the script "neatly brings out the conflicting components within Gwen's character" and praised the episode for raising the moral dilemma of whether to reveal the truth or not. He gave the episode four stars, feeling it to highlight the versatility of Torchwood as a series and to show "how badly science-fiction is overlooked as serious, well-crafted drama". IGN's Travis Fickett rated the episode 9.5 out of ten ("Amazing") and stated it to be "the kind of science fiction that every series should aspire to create." He felt that the episode worked for viewers unfamiliar with the show whilst managing to progress "every regular character in the series". He felt that the episode handled the subject matter of missing people thoughtfully and sensitively whilst furthering the relationship between Rhys and Gwen, stating that it was the "best episode Gwen has had to date" which showcased "Eve Myles range" and Kai Owen's "tremendous power as an actor." Fickett concluded his review by stating that "this is very nearly a perfect episode of not just Torchwood, but the genre of science fiction and the medium of television".

Joan O'Connell Hedman of Slant Magazine also gave a positive review feeling the episode to explore "Torchwood's bread and butter topic: the intersection of the human and the alien, and what it means to be human in the aftermath." She stated that the episode "played to its strengths, namely Eve Myles' Gwen and how she relates to both human and alien" and stated it to demonstrate "how perfect Rhys is for Gwen". She felt that the episode was flawed in its "cop-out" ending and Jack's handling of Gwen but in her conclusion noted it be "the first episode of Torchwood that left me choked up, crying with Gwen at the end". Airlock Alpha's Alan Stanley Blair felt the episode to be a vast improvement on its predecessors stating it be "hard hitting, edgy and explores much bleaker and darker avenues to life in Torchwood". He also felt that the personal effect of Gwen's struggles on her domestic life was one of the most interesting aspects comparing it to the television series Angel which "touched on some of these threads through the meta-story and vampire mythology" but not "on the scale of this [episode]". He concluded that the episode's conclusion was both to its credit and its biggest disappointment because it showed that there is "no way to make everything all right" but left its audience "screaming for a happy ending that will never come". Jason Hughes of AOL TV was more mixed in his review. He felt that the episode was a "vast improvement over last week's episode" and stated that it lived up to Torchwood's reputation as "the darker, more mature cousin of Doctor Who". However, he stated that the episode had "some logistical problems" and "at least one ridiculously convenient coincidence that the emotional hook of the episode hinged on". He praised the "tragic emotional impact of the moment when Jonah's mom told Gwen to promise her not to do that to any other families" and stated that he liked "that there weren't any easy answers". io9's Charlie Jane Anders described "Adrift" as "easily the best episode of the Doctor Who spin-off since the one where Martha Jones showed up". She stated that "the fact that it offered no easy solutions and gave us that super-bleak ending was enough to win me over".
