= Send Foster =

1967 British children's TV series

- Starring: Hayward Morse
- Country of origin: United Kingdom
- Original language: English
- No. of series: 1
- No. of episodes: 12 (all missing)

Production
- Producer: Geoffrey Hughes
- Running time: 25 minutes
- Production company: Rediffusion London

Original release
- Network: ITV
- Release: 6 July – 22 September 1967

Send Foster is a 1967 British children's television series created by Rediffusion London for ITV.

== Overview ==
Johnny Foster is a junior reporter for the Reston Chronicle. His editor, Arthur Harding sends Johnny on assignments that vary from light-hearted where he gets involved in the local pop music scene, to socially significant when Johnny visits an amateur dramatic club where he learns his stories have effects on people and makes him question his conscience. A notable episode tackling racial inequality had Johnny go undercover as a waiter to expose a colour bar in Redstone.

== Cast ==
- Hayward Morse as Johnny Foster
- Patrick Newell as Arthur Harding
- Polly James as Susan

== Production notes ==
Hayward Morse said of his character, Johnny Foster.

As a cub reporter he gets sent on all the so-called dull jobs. But they often turn into really big stories. He runs a 1932 Morris which is the love of his life. That's been the hardest part for me personally. It's meant I've had to learn to drive.

Victor Pemberton got his start as a writer on Send Foster.

== Episodes ==
Episode No.	Episode Title	Original Broadcast Date	Archive Status
1	"Hole in the Road"	6 July 1967	Missing
2	"Once a Thief…"	14 July 1967	Missing
3	"Family Likeness"	21 July 1967	Missing
4	"Henry Wasn't There"	28 July 1967	Missing
5	"I'm Not Coloured - I'm Black"	4 August 1967	Missing
6	"The Peg"	11 August 1967	Missing
7	"The Drama Critic"	18 August 1967	Missing
8	"Which Wedding Were You At?"	25 August 1967	Missing
9	"The Accident"	1 September 1967	Missing
10	"Off the Record"	8 September 1967	Missing
11	"Just Read That Back to Me, Young Man"	15 September 1967	Missing
12	"Unprofessional Conduct"	22 September 1967	Missing

== Missing episodes ==
All 12 episodes are missing although IMDb claims 1 episode has survived.

== See also ==
- Adventure Weekly, a similar series made by the BBC following 5 junior reporters as they run their newspaper with scripts written by Victor Pemberton.
