= William Thomas (actor) =

Welsh actor

- Occupation: Actor
- Years active: 1974-present
- Notable work: Doctor Who, Only Fools and Horses

William Thomas (also known as William Huw-Thomas) is a Welsh television and film actor. He made his first appearance on TV in 1974 and is known for his roles in two Doctor Who episodes, along with roles in other major TV programmes, including Only Fools and Horses and Midsomer Murders in 2007. He played a leading role in the 1997 film, Twin Town.

His appearance in the Doctor Who episode "Boom Town" (2005), having previously been in 1988's Remembrance of the Daleks, made him the first person to appear in both the classic show and the revival.

In 2011, he appeared as a regular in Torchwood: Miracle Day as Gwen Cooper's father, Geraint Cooper; having previously played the character on a one-off occasion in 2008.

He is a fluent Welsh speaker.

== Filmography ==
Television
| Year | Title | Role | Notes |
|---|---|---|---|
| 1974 | Antony and Cleopatra | Soldier | |
| 1975 | Madame Bovary | Albert | |
| 1981 | Grange Hill | Mr. Morgan | Episode: #4.18 |
| 1981 | The Life and Times of David Lloyd George | William George | Episodes: Don't try, Do It – Footnotes of History |
| 1984 | Night Beat News | Greg Phillips | |
| 1984 | The Magnificent Evans | Probert | Episodes: #1.1 – #1.6 |
| 1984 | The District Nurse | Gryp | Episodes: #2.1, #2.2 |
| 1987 | Knights of God | Will | Episode: #1.1 |
| 1988 | Ballroom | Dick | |
| 1988 | Doctor Who | Martin | Episode: Remembrance of the Daleks |
| 1989 | Only Fools and Horses | Barman | Episode: Yuppy Love |
| 1989 | After the War | Mr. Llewellyn | TV miniseries |
| 1990 | Screen One | Cyril | Episode: Sticky Wickets |
| 1991 | We Are Seven | Matthew Thomas | Episodes: #1.2 – #1.6 & #2.2 – #2.7 |
| 1992 | Forever Green | Michael Powell | Episode: #3.3 |
| 1996 | Trip Trap | Dr. Barclay | |
| 1997 | A Mind to Kill | Pub Guvnor | Episode: Game Plan |
| 1998 | Satellite City | Vicar | Episode: Chronicle of a Death Foretold |
| 1999 | Rhinoceros | Constable | |
| 2000 | Longitude | Arthur Mason | |
| 2000 | Cupid & Cate | Paul | |
| 2002 | Fun at the Funeral Parlour | Ivor Thomas | |
| 2002 | A Mind to Kill | John Beckwith | Episode: The Little House in the Forest |
| 2003 | Grass | Eric | Episodes: #1.3 – #1.8 |
| 2005 | Con Passionate | Glyn | |
| 2004–2005, 2021–Present | Pobol y Cwm | Eric Miller, Brynmor | Episodes: To Tea Ysgol, OB Cafe |
| 2005 | Marigold | Milkman | |
| 2005 | Doctor Who | Mr. Cleaver | Episode: Boom Town |
| 2006 | Belonging | William James | Episodes: #7.3, #7.4, #7.5 |
| 2007 | Midsomer Murders | Bryn Williams | Episode: Death and Dust |
| 2007, 2010 | Gavin & Stacey | Father Chris | Series One and Three |
| 2007 | Y Pris | Davey Eddy | Episodes: Y Dechre (The Beginning), Y Fwled Gynta (The First Bullet) |
| 2008 | Belonging | Will | Episode: #9.8 |
| 2008; 2011 | Torchwood | Geraint Cooper | Episodes: Something Borrowed, The New World, The Categories of Life |
| 2009 | Ar Y Tracs | Carwyn | Series Regular |
| 2010 | Alys | William | Series Regular |
| 2016 | Hinterland / Y Gwyll | Robert Owen | Series Three |
| 2023 | Steeltown Murders | Denver Hughes | Series Regular |
| 2023 | Pren ar y Bryn | John Frederick Watkins | Series Regular |
| 2024 | Mammoth | Barry | |
| 2024 | Lost Boys and Fairies | Emrys | Series Regular |
| 2025 | The One That Got Away | Griff Lloyd | |
Film
| Year | Film | Role | Notes |
| 1978 | Casey's Shadow | Weight Scales Jockey Room | |
| 1996 | Darklands | Detective Jarvis | |
| 1997 | Twin Town | Bryn Cartwright | |
| 1999 | Catfish in Black Bean Sauce | Douglas | |
| 1999 | Solomon and Gaenor | Idris Rees | |
| 2000 | Edith's Finger | Vicar | |
| 2000 | Blue Kenny | Dennis Simms | |
| 2000 | The Miracle Maker | | (voice) |
| 2000 | House! | Clipboard | |
| 2001 | Overland | Parry Thomas | |
| 2003 | Y Mabinogi | Hefeydd | (voice) |
| 2006 | January 2nd | Tom | |
| 2007 | The Baker | Alun | |
| 2008 | Freebird | Welsh Farmer | |
| 2010 | Mr. Nice | Mr Marks | |
| 2010 | Ar Y Tracs | Carwyn | |
