= Eve Pearce =

Scottish actress (1929–2023)

- Born: 17 April 1929; Aberdeen, Aberdeenshire, Scotland
- Died: 13 January 2023 (aged 93); Denville Hall, Northwood, London, England
- Occupations: Actress; Poet
- Years active: 1950–2023

Eve Pearce (17 April 1929 – 13 January 2023) was a Scottish actress. She performed in many Royal Shakespeare Company productions.

== Early life ==
Eve Pearce was born in Aberdeen to a very poor family and was brought up in a one-roomed tenement, her mother dying when she was seven years old. When she was twelve, her father remarried and she moved to London. She won an LCC Scholarship to the Royal Academy of Dramatic Art (RADA) in 1948 and got married in her second term to James Ormerod. She began her acting career in 1950 in Preston Rep and in 1951 was part of the first season at the Pitlochry Festival Theatre. She made many appearances in television in the sixties including a squatter with six children in Coronation Street, and also played Mrs Dunstable in the 1971 film version of the TV series Please Sir!. Her career spanned seven decades, including many roles with the RSC and in the West End, notably Amelia in Wild Oats and Rosamonde in Les Liaisons Dangereuses. She played Gilbert's Mother in Mike Leigh's Topsy-Turvy. She had a one-woman play, Woman in the Moon, written for her by Avi Nassa - seen at Edinburgh, and has worked with Ursula Martinez as her older self in Ursula Martinez OAP.

Pearce was a published poet, often writing on her Scottish childhood. Her pamphlet Woman in Winter was published in 2007. She was a member of The Company of Elders and danced at Sadlers Wells.

== Career ==
Pearce first came to a role as the lady assistant in the TV series Kipps. She acted in many Royal Shakespeare Company productions including as Amelia in John O'Keeffe's play, Wild Oats at the Aldwych Theatre in London with Alan Howard, Zoë Wanamaker, Lisa Harrow, Simon Jones, Norman Rodway, Jeremy Irons, Joe Melia, and Ben Cross in the cast. Clifford Williams was director.

In November 2006, she appeared in Torchwood as Estelle Cole, as a past love of Captain Jack Harkness. Pearce portrayed the Gypsy Queen in the television mini-series The 10th Kingdom, directed by Herbert Wise. She appeared in numerous television shows, from Tales of Unease, ('Suspicious Ignorance', episode), Z-Cars to Taggart. She played the German Kaiserin in the mini-serie Fall of Eagles in 1974 then Madame Giselle in the 1992 TV adaptation of Agatha Christie's 'Death in the Clouds'. Her most recent appearances have been in Him and Her, Doctors, Holby City, and Getting On (as Mrs Dethick). Her first poetry collection, Capturing Snowflakes (Greenheart Press), was published in November 2012.

== Death ==
Pearce died at Denville Hall in Northwood, London on 13 January 2023, at the age of 93.
