= Adventure Weekly =

1960s British children's TV series

- Created by: Shaun Sutton
- Written by: Shaun Sutton; Victor Pemberton; Peter J. Hammond; Ian Shurey
- Directed by: Barry Letts; Brian Miller
- Starring: Brent Oldfield; Len Jones; Ian Ellis; Frank Barry; Elizabeth Dear
- Country of origin: United Kingdom
- Original language: English
- No. of series: 1
- No. of episodes: 13 (8 missing)

Production
- Producer: John McRae
- Running time: 25 Minutes

Original release
- Network: BBC1
- Release: 30 December 1968 – 24 March 1969

Adventure Weekly is a British children's television series following 5 young reporters as they run their newspaper, 'Adventure Weekly'. The series was created by Shaun Sutton and aired on BBC1 between 1968 and 1969.

== Story ==
At the Cliffsea Recorder, an ailing local paper, four boys create a junior newspaper, Adventure Weekly. The boys are Peter Perkins, the editor in chief and imaginative son of the proprietor of the Recorder, Andy Rogers, a combative boy with a mechanical know-how and official photographer, making use of his high-quality camera, 'Tubby' Taylor, the papers well-padded sports editor who admired sports from a comfortable seat, and 'Swot' English the mostly serious note of the group who supplied news from the surrounding schools that were so scandalous, only Adventure Weekly would print. The four are soon joined by Frederica 'Fred' Somers, she makes a bad start after doing most things better then the boys but becomes one of the team after leading them to one of their biggest front-page stories. Together the five become involved in various adventures from capturing post office robbers to discovering an unexploded WWII bomb. The five befriend Mr Filling, a typesetter at the Recorder which faced closure until London-based newspaper magnet Lord Huntingford bought the paper out. The newspaper let's the five use their press to print Adventure Weekly while Mr Filling reluctantly gets involved in the kids schemes and plans which gets them in trouble with local bobby PC Cullis.

== Cast ==
- Brent Oldfield as Peter Perkins
- Len Jones as Andy Rogers
- Ian Ellis as 'Tubby Taylor'
- Frank Barry as 'Swot' English
- Elizabeth Dear as Frederica 'Fred' Somers
- Bartlett Mullins as Mr Filling
- Michael Wisher as PC Cullis

== Production ==
Shaun Sutton originally planned the series as a seven-part children's drama but when an additional six episodes were added he brought in writers Victor Pemberton, Peter J. Hammond and Ian Shurey. This was Pemberton's first assignment at the BBC and he recalled it fondly.

Although the idea was hardly earth-shattering, the series and characters were really very appealing. I enjoyed the job very much, not only because it gave me valuable television writing experience, but also because it gave me the chance to work with the late Joan Hickson, that enchanting Miss Marple in a later BBC TV series.

Barry Letts directed most episodes. The location were filmed in the Seaford/Newhaven area which doubled as the fictional town of Cliffsea, interiors were filmed at the BBC studios in Bristol.

== Episodes ==
Episode No.	Episode Title	Writer	Director	Original Broadcast Date	Archive Status
Pilot	"Into Print"	Shaun Sutton	Barry Letts	Unbroadcast	Exists
1	"Into Print"	Shaun Sutton	Barry Letts	30 December 1968	Exist
2	"United Effort"	Shaun Sutton	Barry Letts	6 January 1969	Exist
3	"Explosion"	Peter J. Hammond	Barry Letts	13 January 1969	Missing
4	"Take-Over: Part 1"	Victor Pemberton	Barry Letts	20 January 1969	Missing
5	"Take-Over: Part 2"	Victor Pemberton	Barry Letts	27 January 1969	Missing
6	"Take-Over: Part 3"	Victor Pemberton	Barry Letts	3 February 1969	Missing
7	"The Great Treasure Hunt"	Shaun Sutton	Barry Letts	10 February 1969	Exists
8	"The Dig: Part 1"	Victor Pemberton	Brian Miller	17 February 1969	Missing
9	"The Dig: Part 2"	Victor Pemberton	Brian Miller	24 February 1969	Missing
10	"The Dig: Part 3"	Victor Pemberton	Brian Miller	3 March 1969	Missing
11	"Double Bluff"	Ian Shurey	Barry Letts	10 March 1969	Missing
12	"The Siege"	Victor Pemberton	Barry Letts	17 March 1969	Exists
13	"Stop Press"	Shaun Sutton	Barry Letts	24 March 1969	Exist

== Missing episodes ==
Of the 13 episodes produced, 8 are missing and 5 survive. The unbroadcast pilot also survives.

== After Adventure Weekly ==
Shaun Sutton would become head of drama at the BBC from 1969 to 1981. Victor Pemberton would write for Doctor Who, Timeslip, Ace of Wands and create and write the 1972 children's thriller series Tightrope. Peter J. Hammond would create the fantasy series Sapphire & Steel that aired from 1979 to 1982. Barry Letts would become producer for Doctor Who from 1970 to 1975 and executive producer from 1980 to 1981.

== See also ==
- Send Foster, a similar series made by Rediffusion London following a junior reporter and where Victor Pemberton got his start as a writer.

== External link ==
- Adventure Weekly at IMDb
