= John Normington =

English actor (1937–2007)

John Normington (28 January 1937 – 26 July 2007) was an English actor primarily known for his work on television. Normington was also a member of the Royal Shakespeare Company, performing in more than 20 RSC productions. He performed widely in the West End and at the National Theatre.

== Early life ==
Normington was born 28 January 1937 in Dukinfield, Cheshire, where he resided in Montrose Avenue with his parents and two younger sisters, Judith and Joan. He originally attended Victoria Road Infants School, before transferring to Globe Lane County Primary, then went to Crescent Road Boys School. He trained as an opera singer at the Northern School of Music. Following this, he did his national service, and while stationed in Aldershot joined Farnham rep. Normington joined the Repertory Theatre in Oldham in 1950, and from 1959 to 1962 he worked at the Library Theatre in Manchester. After a short spell at the Oxford Playhouse, he joined the Royal Shakespeare Company in 1963 and played many Shakespearean roles. He continued on stage for the rest of his life, with many memorable roles.

== Acting career ==
In 1963, Normington made his first appearance on television. In the 1960s and 1970s, he appeared in programmes such as Murder Most English; The Caesars; Softly, Softly; Nearest and Dearest; Public Eye; The Edwardians; Crown Court; Upstairs, Downstairs, and ITV Playhouse. His film credits included roles in Inadmissible Evidence (1968), A Midsummer Night's Dream (1968), The Reckoning (1969), Stardust (1974), Rollerball (1975), The Medusa Touch (1978), The Thirty Nine Steps (1978), A Private Function (1984), Hitler's S.S.: Portrait in Evil (1985) as Himmler, My Family and Other Animals (1987), Jack the Ripper (1988) and Wilt (1989).

During the 1980s, Normington appeared in Play for Today; Yes, Prime Minister; Inspector Morse; and Agatha Christie's Poirot. Normington played Morgus in the 1984 Doctor Who serial The Caves of Androzani and Trevor Sigma in the 1988 serial The Happiness Patrol. The following decade, Normington played roles in programmes such as The New Statesman; Peak Practice; Hetty Wainthropp Investigates; Coronation Street; The Bill, and David Copperfield. In 2001 Normington appeared in Love in a Cold Climate.

== Later life ==
In 2004, Normington appeared in King Lear in Stratford. Before the production moved to the West End, he had to withdraw after developing pancreatic cancer. He recovered to an extent that he took on further roles on stage and screen. On stage he appeared in The Voysey Inheritance at the National Theatre in 2006 and The Entertainer at the Old Vic from March to April 2007, before he pulled out due to ill health. On screen, he appeared in the 2004 Midsomer Murders episode; "Bad Tidings"; the Torchwood episode "Ghost Machine"; Trial & Retribution XIV, and Casualty in 2007—his final TV appearance.

== Personal life and death ==
Normington was in a relationship with John Anderson. He died of pancreatic cancer on 26 July 2007 in the Chelsea and Westminster Hospital, London, aged 70.

== Filmography ==
Year	Title	Role	Notes
1968	Inadmissible Evidence	Maples	
1968	A Midsummer Night's Dream	Flute	
1970	The Reckoning	Benham	
1974	Stardust	Harrap	
1975	Rollerball	Executive	
1978	The Medusa Touch	Mr. Copley - John's schoolmaster	
1978	The Thirty Nine Steps	Fletcher	
1981	The Monster Club	Narrator: Ghoul Segment	Voice, Uncredited
1983	Aeschylus' Oresteia (Tony Harrison Adaptation), the National Theatre	Cassandra	
1984	Doctor Who	Morgus	Serial - The Caves of Androzani
1984	Strangers and Brothers	Monty Cave	2 episodes
1984	A Private Function	Lockwood	
1988	Doctor Who	Trevor Sigma	Serial - The Happiness Patrol
1989	Wilt	Treadaway	
2006	Torchwood	Tom Flanagan	Episode - "Ghost Machine"
2007	Atonement	Vicar	(final film role)
