= Something Borrowed (Torchwood) =

2008 Torchwood episode

22 – "Something Borrowed"
- Torchwood episode
- Gwen Cooper wakes up pregnant on her wedding day.

Cast
- Starring: John Barrowman – Captain Jack Harkness; Eve Myles – Gwen Cooper; Burn Gorman – Owen Harper; Naoko Mori – Toshiko Sato; Gareth David-Lloyd – Ianto Jones
- Others: Kai Owen – Rhys Williams; Nerys Hughes – Brenda; Sharon Morgan – Mary; William Thomas – Geraint; Robin Griffith – Barry; Colette Brown – Carrie; Danielle Henry – Megan; Ceri Ann Gregory – Trina; Jonathan Lewis Owen – Banana Boat; Morgan Hopkins – Mervyn; Valerie Murray – Registrar; Pethrow Gooden – Shop Assistant

Production
- Directed by: Ashley Way
- Written by: Phil Ford
- Script editor: Gary Russell
- Produced by: Richard Stokes; Chris Chibnall (co-producer)
- Executive producers: Russell T Davies; Julie Gardner
- Music by: Ben Foster
- Production code: 2.9
- Series: Series 2
- Running time: 50 mins
- First broadcast: 12 March 2008

Chronology
← Preceded by "A Day in the Death"	Followed by → "From Out of the Rain"

"Something Borrowed" is the ninth episode of the second series of the British science-fiction television series Torchwood. It was first broadcast on BBC Three on 5 March 2008 and repeated on BBC Two one week later. The episode was written by Phil Ford of Coronation Street fame, directed by Ashley Way and produced by Richard Stokes. The episode featured the five initial series regulars John Barrowman, Eve Myles, Burn Gorman, Naoko Mori and Gareth David Lloyd plus recurring actor Kai Owen in a central role.

The episode centres on the marriage of the alien hunter Gwen Cooper (Eve Myles) to the transport manager Rhys Williams (Kai Owen). The wedding is complicated by Gwen's sudden impregnation by an alien, though she resolves to see the day through. When the nuptials are interrupted by an attack from the biological mother of the alien fetus (played successively by Colette Brown, Nerys Hughes and John Barrowman), Rhys, Gwen, and Gwen's teammates at Torchwood must neutralise the threat. Gwen and Rhys ultimately marry, and the wedding guests have their memories wiped.

The episode was designed to be the most humorous of Torchwood's second series and incorporated elements of broad comedy and soap opera style storytelling to the monster of the week story. It was filmed largely on location in South Wales—prominent locations included the tourist attractions Margam Country Park and Dyffryn Gardens—and featured an ensemble of previously unseen Welsh characters. The episode was seen by an aggregated total of 4.76 million viewers across its three debut showings in the United Kingdom. Critical response was extremely mixed, with some reviewers praising the inclusion of a less serious episode and others expressing the view that the comedy was too overt.

== Plot ==
The night before her wedding to Rhys, Gwen is impregnated through being bitten by a male shapeshifting alien called a Nostrovite, which carries the fertilised egg before planting them in Gwen as a host body. Jack shoots the Nostrovite dead. On the day of the wedding, Gwen is almost at full term with the Nostrovite foetus. Toshiko is sent to the wedding venue to keep an eye on Gwen and to deliver a new wedding dress to accommodate her alien pregnancy. The male Nostrovite's female partner arrives at the venue intending to kill the foetus' host, and birthing it.

As Gwen and Rhys prepare to say their wedding vows, Jack runs up the aisle and demands that the wedding be halted. The half-eaten corpse of the wedding DJ Mervyn is discovered by the bridesmaid Megan, who alerts the entire wedding party to the murder. The Nostrovite reveals herself and is chased away by Jack, escaping through a window. Gwen tries shooting the Nostrovite, now disguised as Rhys' mother, but the maternal instinct has made her unstoppable.

Owen suggests using the singularity scalpel to destroy the alien foetus, after having done work on it since the Mayfly incident with Martha Jones. (Note: As depicted in the 2008 episode "Reset".) He sends Gwen to her room and teaches Rhys how to use the scalpel; Owen cannot use it himself due to injuries sustained in his undead state. (Note: As depicted in the 2008 episode "A Day in the Death".) When the shapeshifter arrives in the room disguised as Jack, Owen shoots her whilst Gwen exits with Rhys. Rhys and Gwen find refuge in a barn. As the Nostrovite launches an assault on the door of the barn, Rhys succeeds in destroying the foetus. The Nostrovite enters, again impersonating Rhys' mother. She attacks Rhys, who attempts to protect himself with a chainsaw, which malfunctions. Jack arrives and kills the alien with a more powerful gun. Rhys and Gwen return to the wedding venue and are married. At the wedding reception, the guests all suddenly fall asleep. Jack reveals that he has drugged them all with amnesia pills mixed with sedative so that they will not remember the events of the day. Jack offers Gwen and Rhys the amnesia pill but Gwen declines as she does not want any secrets in her marriage to Rhys.

== Production ==
=== Conception and writing ===
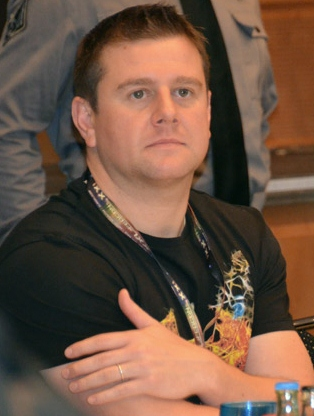
Actor Kai Owen, whose character Rhys was described by writer Phil Ford as "the hero of the episode".

The original working title and given descriptor in the series breakdown for "Something Borrowed" was "The Wedding". Writer Phil Ford felt the episode to be reminiscent of a soap-opera as well as possessing science fiction elements. He describes the episode as "Coronation Street meets Torchwood". Ford was chosen to write this episode because of his own involvement as a writer on Coronation Street and executive producer Russell T Davies' view that this would enable him to handle a wedding with comedic elements. As the most humorous episode of the series it was deliberately scheduled alongside a series of darker episodes to provide a contrast.

Describing the tone of the episode Ford describes it as "an all out romp" and an "action, rollercoaster ride" with "a lot of comedy in it as much as thrills and nasty monsters". Davies stated that "the whole point of the episode is to have a right old laugh". Expanding on the comedic aspects, something Ford considered whilst writing the episode was that "the trick is to have the comedy come out of the characters" rather than the scenario itself. It was Eve Myles' idea to have Gwen compulsively eat gherkins after waking up pregnant; the script had only specified the character drinking a glass of water. The episode also plays on Gwen's conflicted feelings between Jack and Rhys. Davies felt it would be "irresistible" to have the wedding temporarily halted by "the one man Rhys doesn't want to see running down the aisle." Ford stated that whilst Jack is "the series hero" Rhys is "the hero of this episode". He compares a sequence where Rhys arms himself with a chainsaw to defend Gwen to the character being in "Evil Dead mode". Producer Richard Stokes commented that the episode illuminated that "even though [Gwen]'s put [Rhys] through some really difficult times, she really does love him and want to be with him." In an early draft of the script Gwen and Rhys had their memories wiped at the end of the episode in addition to the other guests and were convinced by Jack that the wedding had been problem free.

=== Casting ===
The episode featured an ensemble of family and friends of Gwen and Rhys previously unseen in the series. William Thomas and Sharon Morgan were cast as Gwen's parents Geraint and Mary Cooper. Davies re-introduced the characters during the fourth series of the show, considering Thomas and Morgan to be "two fine Welsh actors". Thomas had previously appeared as two different characters in the 1988 Doctor Who serial Remembrance of the Daleks and the 2005 Doctor Who episode "Boom Town". Upon appearing in "Something Borrowed" he became the first actor to have appeared in all three of the classic series, new series and Torchwood. Nerys Hughes played Rhys' mother Brenda Williams, in addition to a duplicate form of the alien Nostrovite. Like Thomas she had previously appeared in a Doctor Who serial (the 1982 story Kinda). Hughes enjoyed getting to play a "monster" for the first time in her career which involved having "fangs and claws and red eyes" and being wired up so "all this black blood can ooze out when I get shot". Despite the funny aspect of the script Hughes took the role seriously stating that "everyone plays it for real" and that "you can't camp it up". She believed that as an actor "you've got to believe what you're doing".

Kai Owen describes Thomas, Morgan and Hughes collectively with Robin Griffith (Barry Williams) as a "good old-fashioned Welsh cast who know what it's all about". Jonathan Lewis Owen was cast as Rhys' best man "Banana Boat" a character referred to sporadically since Torchwood's first series premiere "Everything Changes" (2006). In keeping with the character's name he was given a pair of banana patterned cuff links to complement his costume. As a joke, Eve Myles (who Jonathan Owen had previously worked with in other projects) left a banana skin on his car on his first day of filming. Colette Brown played "Carrie", the original human form of the mother Nostrovite. To transform her into the alien creature the actress was required to spend approximately an hour having make-up applied. Brown was surprised at the efficiency of the make-up artists as she had expected the transformation process to take longer. Originally, the human versions of the Nostrovite shapeshifter were intended to be more monstrous but Davies felt it was important that the audience would still be able to recognise the actor underneath once the make up had been applied.

=== Filming ===
The episode was filmed between October and November 2007 in the sixth production block of the series, alongside "Exit Wounds". The sequence of Jack, Ianto and Owen leaving for Gwen's wedding was recorded at Roald Dahl Plass on 25 October 2007. A number of locations were used for the wedding venue. Producer Richard Stokes notes that "it felt like we were organising a real wedding but one that was being shot in about five different venues". Director Ashley Way states that in directing the wedding scenes, the production team had to make sure that the colour scheme co-ordinated in regards to aspects like the bridesmaids costumes and the flower patterns. Costume designer Ray Holman experienced difficulty sourcing a maternity wedding dress to accommodate the nine-month baby bump worn by Eve Myles. He remarks that in trying to source three such dresses from bridal shops in Cardiff he was regarded "as if I was the biggest sinner in the world" and ended up designing the dress worn by Gwen himself.

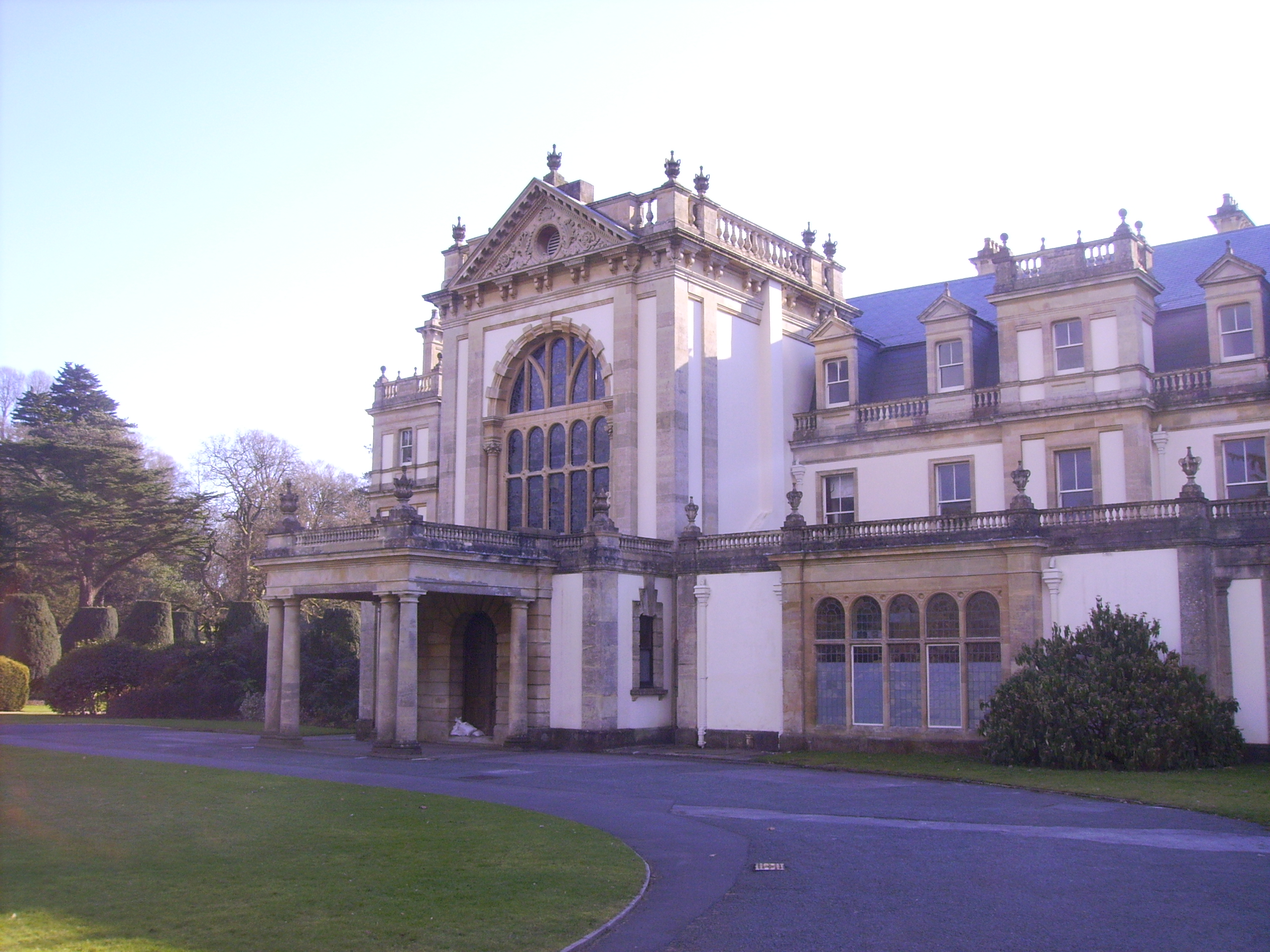
The House at Dyffryn Gardens was used for the hotel exteriors whilst the Gardens provided the location for the hotel gardens.

The main location shoot for the episode was at Margam Country Park in Margam, Port Talbot in and around a converted Orangery which provided a location for the wedding and reception. Way states that one of the reasons Margam's Orangery was chosen for the shoot was because of the "fantastic windows" which provided a good visual opportunity in regards to a sequence involving the alien Carrie jumping out of them. However, due to its listed building status the production crew were not able to remove the window glass for filming and had to construct replica windows on separate scaffolding using resin glass. The hotel exteriors and sequences set in the gardens of the wedding venue were filmed at Dyffryn Gardens in St Nicholas, Vale of Glamorgan. The hotel interiors were partly recorded at Court Colman Manor in the village of Pen-y-fai, Bridgend, and partly in studio. The opening sequence of the episode where Gwen pursues the shape-shifter was recorded on 19 November in a men's public toilet in The Hayes, a shopping area in central Cardiff.

The episode featured a large amount of incidental music. During Gwen's hen night, the club she is in plays the tracks "Filthy/Gorgeous" and "Comfortably Numb" by the Scissor Sisters from their eponymous 2004 album and the single "Hole in the Head" from the Sugababes 2003 album Three. The song heard on Gwen's radio Alarm Clock when she wakes up heavily pregnant is "Fire in My Heart" from the Welsh rock band Super Furry Animals. At Gwen and Rhys' wedding reception, the records played include "You Do Something to Me" by Paul Weller and the song "Tainted Love" by Soft Cell. One of the black and white photos of Jack seen at the end of the episode is actually a promotional picture of John Barrowman from his role as Billy Flynn in the musical Chicago.

== Broadcast and reception ==
"Something Borrowed" was first broadcast on the digital channel BBC Three on 5 March 2008 at 9:50 pm, straight after the BBC Two broadcast of the preceding episode "A Day in the Death" at 9:00 pm. The episode was first broadcast on BBC Two on 12 March at 9:00 pm, with a pre-watershed repeat airing on 13 March at 7:00 pm. According to consolidated figures the episode was viewed by 0.98 million viewers on BBC Three, 2.76 million viewers for its 12 March BBC Two showing and 1.02 million viewers for the pre-watershed repeat amounting to an aggregated 4.76 million viewers across its three initial showings. The episode was also available to watch on the online catch up service BBC iPlayer, where it was the 12th most viewed individual broadcast between 1 January and 31 March 2008.

=== Critical reception ===
The episode received critical response ranging from extremely positive to extremely negative. Ben Rawson-Jones of Digital Spy gave the episode five stars out of five, summarising it as an "energetic romp that oozed with body horror that would make David Cronenberg proud" which also "infused a type of family melodrama commonly seen on soaps". He praised the "stunningly bonkers" plot noting that "every potential dramatic and comedic moment that stemmed from Gwen's unconventional 'bun in the oven' scenario was fully maximised". He felt that in the central role "Eve Myles delivered an outstanding performance as Gwen" and also singled out the guest actors for praise, particularly Nerys Hughes. In an end of series review he listed "Something Borrowed" as his favourite episode of Torchwood's second series. Writing for The Stage, Mark Wright wrote that "it’s good to see Torchwood can get in touch with its lighter side and not lose any momentum" concluding "I think I really might love this show". Jon Beresford of TV Scoop felt the episode to be one of the strongest of the second series. Whilst he felt it to be "corny" in places he summarised the episode as an "exciting yarn with some really good performances from the team". He felt that Myles and Owen "stole the show" as Gwen and Rhys believing that "there's a definite spark between these two that sets their moments apart."

Joan O'Connell Hedman of Slant Magazine felt the episode to be the strongest of the second series. She praised the "uniformly fantastic" guest cast and the "drop dead gorgeous" exterior and interior locations. She singled out writer Phil Ford for considerable praise feeling that he wrote the episode true to the characters "while filling in backstory we had no way of imagining" and delivered "drama, action, and laughs". Brad Trechak of AOL TV felt the more comic episode was a welcome respite from darker episodes. He praised the episode for being "light and fluffy yet it furthered things along with regard to the Torchwood universe and its characters". Reviewing the episode Brigid Cherry of Total Sci-Fi felt that "contrary to expectation – it’s hilarious". She praised the comedy provided from Eve Myles, Gareth David-Lloyd and Nerys Hughes in particular as well as the "terrifying moments that threaten to tip over into gross-out horror-comedy." She felt overall the "offbeat self-parody" made a welcome change from the show's more serious episodes and rated it eight out of ten. Den of Geek's Jack Kibble-White found the episode to be a "surprise series highlight".

However, the episode attracted heavy criticism. In a review titled "Too Much Crying, Not Enough Shagging" io9's Charlie Jane Anders criticised the episode's reliance on "cheesy soap opera moments". Her major criticisms also encompassed the nonsensical aspects of the plot and the depiction of Torchwood as an incompetent team, particularly in allowing Gwen to progress with her wedding in the circumstance of her being pregnant. She felt that the episode had saving graces in a sequence which she felt acted as an homage to films Dead Alive and Evil Dead and the fact it made her believe "that Rhys and Gwen care about each other." Ian Berriman of SFX magazine wrote that the episode was one of the weakest of the second series and was hampered by "limp gags and thuddingly obvious characterisation". IGN's Travis Fickett rated the episode five out of ten and criticised it as "flat out bad television". He felt the comedic style to be at odds with Torchwood's science fiction and horror storytelling and criticised some of the character moments as "preposterous" and "insipid". Airlock Alpha's Alan Stanley Blair was more mixed stating that the "episode feels like a lot of ideas have been thrown into a pot and mixed with all the Torchwood goodness". He felt that the episode held together "by luck more than skill" but still "provided a lot of laughs and some wild fun". Den of Geek's Andrew Mickel felt that the episode exaggerated and stereotyped the Welsh characters in the overall scenario parodying them collectively as "the Welshest people on television". He also criticised the focus on Gwen and the ridiculousness of her plan to marry Rhys despite her being pregnant. He felt however, that the episode played out "like a fun episode of Buffy" and that Rhys continued to be "Gwen’s one redeeming feature", praising the scenes between him and his mother.
