= Nuts and Bolts (TV series) =

Welsh television drama series

Nuts and Bolts is a television drama series set in the fictional South Wales town of Ystrad. It began airing in 1999 on HTV. It ran weekly for three years until it was cancelled in 2002.

Filmed entirely on location in Merthyr Tydfil, the series made large use of exterior locations, with many interiors being recorded in a former Welsh Water depot; which became a hastily improvised television studio.

The first series was hailed an instant success, and became renowned for its accurate portrayal of valleys life (much like the BBC Wales series Belonging) and became a proving-ground for new Welsh drama talent, such as Eve Myles, Jonathan Owen, Jason May, Lawrence Llewellyn, Nathan Jones, Craig Barlow and Dean Keohane. The initial episode received complaints from viewers for showing content unsuitable for the early-evening timeslot in which the programme was shown, which were upheld by the regulator, the ITC.

The series was awarded The Royal Television Society Award for Best Regional Drama in 1999. However, erratic scheduling and a lack of commitment to show the drama nationally, (except irregular, late-night showings on ITV2), led to the series being cancelled in November 2002; just one month after Nuts and Bolts finished its fourth-series run on HTV.

The series was devised and created by Lynnette Jenkins. The show was HTV's first soap opera for fifteen years. A number of scheduling and channel changes resulted in a considerable loss of viewership, ultimately leading to its cancellation in 2002.
