= Gwen Cooper =

Fictional character from the television series Torchwood

- Torchwood character
- First appearance: "Everything Changes" (2006)
- Last appearance: Miracle Day: "The Blood Line" (2011)
- Shared universe appearances: Doctor Who (2008)

In-universe information
- Alias: PC Cooper
- Affiliation: South Wales Police; Torchwood Institute
- Family: Geraint Cooper (father); Mary Cooper (mother)
- Spouse: Rhys Williams
- Children: Anwen Williams
- Origin: Cardiff, Wales
- Home era: Early 21st century

Gwen Elizabeth Cooper is a fictional character portrayed by Welsh actress Eve Myles in the BBC science-fiction television programme Torchwood, a spin-off of the long-running series Doctor Who. The lead female character, Gwen featured in every episode of the show's 2006–2011 run, as well as two 2008 crossover episodes of Doctor Who. Gwen appears in Expanded Universe material such as the Torchwood novels and audiobooks, comic books and radio plays.

Within the series narrative, Gwen is a South Wales Police officer who discovers the mysterious Torchwood Institute, into which she is recruited by Jack Harkness (John Barrowman). Gwen initially operates as a field agent, bringing a humane and rounded approach to the team's investigations of the extraterrestrial. Gwen's work begins to take a toll on her personal life in the first series (2006), but her marriage to Rhys (Kai Owen) keeps her grounded, even as her responsibilities increase in Series 2 (2008). In Children of Earth (2009) and Miracle Day (2011), after Torchwood is destroyed to conceal a government conspiracy, a much hardened Gwen operates under her own mandate as the world undergoes crises linked with unprecedented alien threats.

Gwen is introduced as an audience surrogate, in the mould of the "girl next door" archetype, much like the perennial "companion" character in Doctor Who. However, as the series progressed, the production team chose to emphasise contradictory aspects to her character by having Gwen make ethically dubious decisions. As the show progresses, and even after becoming a mother, Gwen evolves into a more militant action heroine and finds herself willing to make tough decisions to protect those closest to her.

Reviewers have generally responded positively to the complexity of Gwen's character and Eve Myles' portrayal, though critics found fault with her more prosaic characterisation earlier on. Eve Myles' portrayal of Gwen has been cited as effective in both promoting the country of Wales and combating a perceived prejudice against the Welsh accent. Myles received a Welsh BAFTA for the first series of the show and was nominated for several other acting awards across each of Torchwood's four series'.

== Appearances ==
=== Television ===
Gwen is introduced in the first episode of Torchwood, in which she—a Cardiff police officer— witnesses Captain Jack Harkness (John Barrowman) and his team interrogating a dead man in an alley. After investigating the Torchwood team, she locates the Torchwood Institute's Cardiff branch, home to a team of alien hunters. Though Jack wipes her memories, they are later triggered by reports of murders committed with exotic weaponry. Torchwood's own Suzie Costello (Indira Varma) is the serial killer. Gwen is present at Suzie's attempt to kill Jack, and Suzie's ensuing suicide. Jack reveals that he cannot die and offers Gwen a job in Torchwood. Jack and Gwen's relationship takes on a romantic hue, despite her long-standing relationship with boyfriend Rhys (Kai Owen). Gwen falls into a short-lived destructive affair with colleague Owen (Burn Gorman), after a particularly traumatic experience with cannibals, which she cannot share with Rhys. Shortly afterwards, Gwen is targeted and almost killed by a vengeful undead Suzie. In their conversations, Gwen is shocked to realise the extent to which Torchwood neglected Suzie's emotional welfare, and Suzie is resentful towards Gwen, who has replaced her both professionally, and as Owen's lover. Wracked with guilt, Gwen confesses her affair with Owen after it ends in "Combat", but she drugs Rhys with an amnesia pill so he will not remember her confession. In the series one finale, her desire to resurrect a murdered Rhys motivates her to mutiny against Jack by opening the rift in time and space which Torchwood monitors. After Jack sacrifices himself to the released supernatural demon, Gwen maintains a vigil, certain that he will resurrect. As she loses hope, giving Jack a parting kiss, he awakens and thanks her. Shortly afterwards, Jack abandons Torchwood to reunite with the mysterious "Doctor" from his past.

In 2008, as series two begins, Gwen has replaced Jack as team leader. When Jack returns to lead Torchwood, Gwen displays anger towards him for abandoning the team, and surprises him with the news she has become engaged. In a later episode she is forced to tell Rhys about her job at Torchwood when he assumes she is having an affair with Jack. After Rhys takes a bullet for her Gwen defies Jack by refusing to wipe Rhys' memories, feeling humbled by her partner's loyalty and bravery. In "Something Borrowed", despite being pregnant to an alien Nostrovite, Gwen refuses to postpone the wedding to Rhys. Her marriage makes Jack remember an earlier marriage of his own. In "Adrift" Rhys continues to push Gwen to unburden herself from her traumatic experiences, after her attempt to re-unite families with missing children stolen by the rift goes horribly wrong. In the series finale, Gwen's leadership skills allow her to co-ordinate Cardiff during the chaos caused by Captain John Hart (James Marsters) and Jack's younger brother Gray (Lachlan Nieboer). When Gray kills Gwen's teammates Toshiko (Naoko Mori) and Owen, Gwen is desolate. The character makes a crossover appearance in Doctor Who alongside Jack and Ianto (Gareth David-Lloyd) in its 2008 series' two-part finale, in which Torchwood help contact series protagonist the Doctor (David Tennant) during an invasion of the psychopathic mutant Daleks, and later must defend their headquarters from the attacking aliens. The Doctor suggests a connection to Gwyneth, a separate character portrayed by Eve Myles in the 2005 Doctor Who episode "The Unquiet Dead". She was also mentioned in the alternate universe created in the Doctor Who episode "Turn Left" when Rose Tyler (Billie Piper) mentioned that she and Ianto were killed in the attempt to stop the Sontarans' invasion of Earth with ATMOs devices, whilst Jack is imprisoned on their homeworld.

In Children of Earth, a five-part serial broadcast in 2009, Gwen is a more militant heroine shaped by the increased responsibilities and pressures of her job. In part one, aliens called the 4-5-6 communicate to the world by taking possession of its children and a middle-aged man, Clem McDonald (Paul Copley). Gwen investigates by visiting Clem, who—being possessed of psychic abilities—announces to her she is pregnant, which she later confirms using technology at the Torchwood Hub. Gwen is forced to defend herself from assassins after the Hub is destroyed to conceal a government conspiracy, taking Rhys on the run with her, and re-establishing Torchwood Three in a London warehouse. By making contact with government PA Lois Habiba (Cush Jumbo), Gwen discovers her fugitive status and is able to survey cabinet meetings. When Ianto is killed fighting the 4-5-6, Gwen and Rhys return to Cardiff to protect his niece and nephew from the armed forces, ordered by the government to sacrifice a percentage of the country's children as appeasement. She feels she now understands the Doctor's periodic absence during various crises in Earth's history; believing him to sometimes "look at this planet, and turn away in shame". In the dénouement of the final part, Gwen is six months pregnant when she returns Jack's vortex manipulator to him. She insists he stay; he leaves her behind and abandons Earth.

Fourth series Miracle Day (2011), an American co-production, re-establishes Gwen, Rhys and their daughter Anwen living reclusively in rural Wales. CIA agent Rex Matheson (Mekhi Phifer) renditions Gwen to the United States, believing a worldwide phenomenon wherein no one can die to be connected to Torchwood and she becomes part of a new Torchwood team alongside Jack, Rex and former CIA analyst Esther Drummond (Alexa Havins). In "The Categories of Life" and "The Middle Men" Gwen returns to Wales to rescue her ailing father Geraint (William Thomas), who survived a fatal heart attack on "Miracle Day", from a facility where the critically injured are incinerated. Upon her return to America her family are kidnapped as leverage to make her surrender Jack. Gwen tells Jack, now ostensibly mortal, that she would allow him to be killed to save Anwen. After Gwen is deported by senior CIA official Allen Shapiro (John De Lancie) because of her dissidence she focusses on protecting her father from the authorities; enclosing him in her mother Mary's (Sharon Morgan) cellar and supplying him with palliative medicine. The concluding episode, "The Blood Line" opens with Gwen eulogising her father as the kindest man she has ever known, before stating that she is about to kill him. When the power and profit driven conspirators behind Miracle Day try to thwart her resolve by wounding Esther, Gwen declares she will sacrifice her entire Torchwood team to restore order. She shoots Jack through the heart, allowing his unique blood to prompt an ancient phenomenon to reset the human morphic field. As Geraint and other "Miracle Day" survivors pass away peacefully, Jack's immortality is restored. Gwen is shocked to discover at Esther's funeral that Rex is now immortal too.

In the 2021 New Year's Special "Revolution of the Daleks," Jack departs the TARDIS to reconnect with Gwen. Jack tells the Thirteenth Doctor that Gwen fought off a Dalek with a moped and her son's boxing gloves during the recent invasion, revealing that she has had another child in the years that have passed since the end of Miracle Day.

=== Literature ===
Look, Rhys, will you stop a minute? Thanks. It's just ...' She paused, took a breath. 'It's just I've been thinking, love, and I've decided I'll be keeping my own name.

— The novel Skypoint depicts Gwen's decision to retain her maiden name.

Gwen appears in all Torchwood novels published by BBC Books to date. The first wave, Another Life, Border Princes, and Slow Decay, set between the series one episodes of Torchwood, were published in January 2007. These novels expand on the difficult period in Gwen and Rhys' relationship. In Border Princes she engages in an affair with the mysterious James Mayer, while Rhys is endangering himself for her in Slow Decay by taking an alien diet pill to impress her. Published in March 2008, and tying in with the concurrently airing second series of Torchwood, Gwen appears in the novels Trace Memory, The Twilight Streets, and Something in the Water. Gwen's first day with Andy Davidson as her beat partner is portrayed in a flashback in Trace Memory. In The Twilight Streets an alternate-future Torchwood is depicted; headed by Gwen and Rhys, after the demise of Tosh, Owen, Ianto and Jack. Three more Torchwood books were released in October 2008: Pack Animals, SkyPoint, and Almost Perfect. These novels maintain the series chronology: Pack Animals depicts Gwen attempting to plan for her wedding alongside her Torchwood mission. SkyPoint, in which Gwen and Rhys discover an alien threat whilst flathunting, is set soon after their wedding in "Something Borrowed". Gwen's continued use of her maiden name is not specifically addressed in the TV show, but SkyPoint sees her consciously reject the name "Mrs Williams", after the unfamiliarity and awkwardness of hearing Jack address her this way. The novel Almost Perfect is the first to be set after the episode Exit Wounds in which Tosh and Owen are killed; Gwen becomes concerned at Rhys' increasing role in her investigations. The May 2009 wave of books consisted of Into the Silence, Bay of the Dead, and The House that Jack Built. Later novels published in October 2009 include Risk Assessment, The Undertaker's Gift, and Consequences, all set between "Exit Wounds" and Children of Earth. Gwen appears in three Torchwood: Miracle Day prequel novels released in Summer 2011. In First Born Gwen and Rhys encounter sinister forces in rural Wales whilst adjusting to parenthood and life in hiding. Gwen appears briefly in flashback material in Long Time Dead and The Men Who Sold the World, novels which explore the aftermath of the destruction of Torchwood's headquarters and the technology left behind. Written by John and Carole Barrowman and published in September 2012, the novel Exodus Code unites Gwen and Jack in a transatlantic mission following the events of Miracle Day.

First published in January 2008, the monthly Torchwood Magazine included Torchwood comic strips in which Gwen appeared. Gareth David-Lloyd's comic, "Shrouded", includes a scene set after Children in Earth, which shows Gwen cradling her young child. As Gwen is busy, Rhys is required to team up with Captain John Hart to save the timeline. During series two, the Torchwood website hosted an interactive online game written by series writer Phil Ford. Eve Myles makes a brief appearance as Gwen towards the end of the game, alongside Gareth David-Lloyd, when her character and Ianto shut down a broadcast from the fictitious Dark Talk studio. Throughout both series one and two, the interactive websites co-written by James Goss featured electronic literature content (such as fictitious internet messaging conversations and letters) which depict aspects of Gwen and the other Torchwood characters' work and personal lives. The Torchwood Archives by Gary Russell — an insider's look into Torchwood — collects much of this ancillary online literature in hardback form, along with new material, some of which expands on Gwen's background and life before Torchwood. Details are given of Gwen's university attendance, a previous boyfriend named Bruce, and her time with Andy in the police force. Photographs are provided of Gwen and Rhys, which were used as set dressing in the TV series, and fictitious in-universe documents such as Gwen's personnel form and her Torchwood case reports. In a similar vein to The Torchwood Archives, from a real-world perspective, Gary Russell's The Torchwood Encyclopedia (2009) expands on "every fact and figure" for Gwen and the Torchwood world.

=== Audio drama ===
Gwen appeared in four original Torchwood audiobooks from BBC Books in 2008 which tied in with the second series of the television drama. The first of these—Hidden and Everyone Says Hello, narrated by Naoko Mori and Burn Gorman respectively— were released in February whilst two further releases—In the Shadows, narrated by Gwen's portrayer Eve Myles, and The Sin Eaters, narrated by Gareth David-Lloyd — were released in September. Two additional original audiobooks set following the events of the second series—Ghost Train and Department X—were published in March 2011 and narrated by Kai Owen. In Ghost Train Gwen is killed: as Jack is missing Rhys has to work alone to reverse his wife's fate. Gwen's investigations after Miracle Day are depicted in 2012 audio books. In Army of One, released in March, written by Ian Edginton and narrated by Kai Owen, Gwen and Rhys are drawn into the investigation of an alien serial killer in Washington DC. In Fallout, released April, written by David Llewellyn and read by Tom Price, Andy has an extraterrestrial investigation of his own in the UK and requires assistance from Gwen by telephone. In May's release, Red Skies written by Joseph Lidster and narrated by John Telfer, Jack has a premonition that Gwen has been ostensibly shot in the chest. However, in the following instalment, Mr Invincible, a brief appearance from Rhys and Gwen reveal that the characters have returned to Wales safely following their time in the United States.

Joseph Lidster wrote a Torchwood radio drama, "Lost Souls", which aired in September 2008 as a Radio 4 Afternoon Play featuring the voices of John Barrowman, Eve Myles, Gareth David-Lloyd and Freema Agyeman (Martha). Set after the events of the 2008 series, Gwen and the team make their first international adventure in CERN in Geneva, as part of Radio 4's special celebration of the switching on of the Large Hadron Collider. The special radio episode's plot focuses both on the Large Hadron Collider's activation and the doomsday scenario some warned it might cause, and the team's mourning of Toshiko and Owen's recent deaths. Between 1 and 3 July 2009, Radio 4 aired three further audio dramas in the Afternoon Play time-slot, titled "Asylum", "Golden Age" and "The Dead Line", bridging the gap between Series 2 and 3. "The Dead Line" depicts Gwen working together with Rhys to investigate a mysterious case; she identifies him as a member of Torchwood during the mission. To tie in with the show's fourth series, Torchwood: Miracle Day, the BBC produced three more radio plays, airing between 11 and 13 July 2011. Titled "The Devil and Miss Carew", "Submission" and "House of the Dead", these plays fill narrative gaps between "Exit Wounds" and Miracle Day and feature the voices of Myles, Barrowman and David-Lloyd.

Myles reprised the role of Gwen in a series of full cast audio dramas as part of an ongoing Torchwood series from Big Finish Productions. The third release of the series, Forgotten Lives, co-stars Kai Owen as Rhys and re-introduces the characters four years after the events of Miracle Day.

== Casting and initial characterisation ==
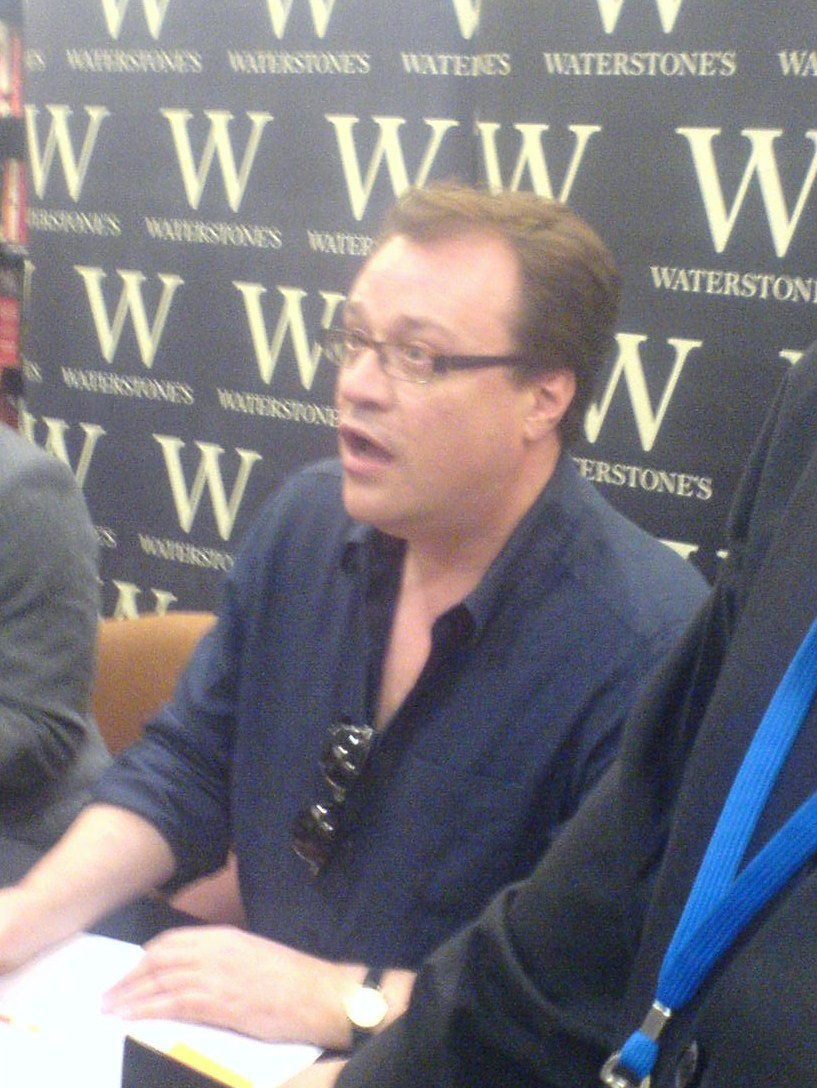
Russell T Davies created Gwen specifically for Eve Myles.

Lead writer and executive producer Russell T Davies initially had the idea of an unnamed policewoman stumbling across a team of alien investigators in an alley as a premise, before Torchwood or the 2005 revival of Doctor Who were commissioned. Having been enamoured by her television performances, most notably in the 2005 episode of Doctor Who in which she guest-starred, Davies wrote the character of Gwen specifically for Eve Myles. Myles stated that having the part written for her was like her "own personal Oscar". Part of the attraction of playing Gwen for Myles was that she had the opportunity to play an action hero with her own accent. Speaking on the casting of Welsh actors on Torchwood, Davies commented that it was deliberately intended, to make the Welsh accent mainstream, "to make it as acceptable as Scottish or Irish". In an analysis of Welsh mythology in Torchwood, Lynette Porter observes that Gwen's national consciousness forms part of her characterisation: her knowledge of local myths "highlights her Welsh heritage and common knowledge from her experience and formal education." Discussing the international co-production behind series four, executive producer Julie Gardner commented that Myles' continued involvement helped ensure that the "flavour of Wales" remained evident.

In the first series of Torchwood, Gwen functioned as an audience surrogate. Russell T Davies likened her character type to that of 2005–06 Doctor Who lead female Rose Tyler (Billie Piper): "She is the ordinary person who stumbles into something extraordinary and finds herself their equal." Eve Myles characterised Gwen as an ambitious and feisty young woman, who at the same time embodies many aspects of the girl next door archetype. Her distinct role within the team stems from the fact that "she's there for the people", who she feels "instinctive and passionate" about. Producer Richard Stokes noted that Gwen possesses more "human empathy" than the more mercenary members of the team, who are seen to be "technology-and-alien-obsessed". In this vein, lead actor John Barrowman commented that Gwen brings a "little bit of soul" back to Jack. Describing the ways in which Gwen's methods differ from the rest of the team, Myles explained how her police procedural training relates to the job: "she deals with the families, she deals with profiling, she deals with searching people's backgrounds. It's a new way of working she brings in". Myles stated that Gwen would have made a "fantastic policewoman" prior to joining Torchwood, drawing on the character's ability to get vulnerable characters to "open up by making them feel comfortable". Myles perceived Gwen to be "the heart and emotion of Torchwood", and "Torchwood's social worker" who can "run and fight and stand in her own corner and win". Gaining insight into Torchwood through curiosity, Gwen becomes part of Torchwood because they need her, just as she needs them. Gwen's friendship with former colleague Andy is used by the production team to juxtapose her extraordinary life with a mundane one, as well as highlighting her transformation into a harder woman. Andy is present immediately before Gwen first encounters Torchwood, and Myles feels his later appearances "takes you right back to the beginning, it reminds you where she came from, how Jack found Gwen". Myles observed that Gwen's many facets prevent her from getting bored; she feels constantly challenged "physically", "mentally" and "morally" through portraying the character.

Eve Myles previously appeared in the 2005 Doctor Who episode "The Unquiet Dead" as Gwyneth, a 19th-century clairvoyant. Gwyneth had a connection to the Cardiff Rift, which later became a central plot device in Torchwood. In response to questions about the similarity of the characters' names, Russell T Davies denied they were connected, stating they are "just two names beginning with "G"." Subsequently however, Davies' 2008 Doctor Who episode "Journey's End" alluded to a familial relationship between the characters (with the Doctor specifically asking if Gwen was a family name and Gwen replying that it was), explaining their physical resemblance as the result of "spatial genetic multiplicity". Eve Myles said of the two characters, "it was never on the cards as such, but something in the back of my head always said that they were going to be connected somehow." Davies explained that the relationship between the characters is not literal, stating that "It's not familial as we understand it" instead characterising spatial genetic multiplicity as "an echo and repetition of physical traits across a Time Rift."

== Development ==
=== Morality ===
It was completely out of character for Gwen. But that's what good drama is all about. You don't want to spoon-feed a sci-fi audience. You want to challenge them. So none of these characters are safe.

— Actress Eve Myles, comments on Gwen's affair in series one.

Despite being promoted as the show's heart and moral conscience, the flaws in Gwen's own morality are explored throughout the series; a press release noted that she is both selfless and selfish. The first series sees Gwen embark on a brief affair with colleague Owen Harper. Executive producer Russell T Davies explains that the episode "Countrycide" was deliberately structured in order to make the affair seem inevitable as Gwen struggles to cope with Torchwood life. For Davies, the dalliance is a "human" one, told in an adult manner characterised by "lust and anger and hurt and the joy you get out of the initial stages of having an affair". Myles commented that Gwen's compromised morality, as demonstrated by her affair was suitably challenging for a science fiction audience, and served to demonstrate that none of the Torchwood team were "safe" from temptation. Writer Stephen James Walker argues that Gwen's moral ambiguity made her a more compelling character. Since she was introduced as an audience surrogate, Walker claimed it would have been an easy trap to make her a "one-dimensional paragon of virtue". Instead, the writers made Gwen more "realistic" by giving her "distinct human failings", which Walker felt made her "arguably the most complex and interesting of the five regulars". He identified these failures as her "tendency towards egotism", "self-righteousness", and "selfishness", evident in her "highly questionable treatment" of boyfriend Rhys Williams. Walker cited her affair with Owen as an example, as well as the scene in "Combat" where she confesses this betrayal to Rhys after dosing him with the amnesia drug Retcon so he won't remember.

Linnie Blake felt that Gwen's had a passive role in her own affair; as with her lesbian clinch with an alien and her forceable impregnation; she argues that the Gothic situations in Torchwood continually parallels in the "invasion" of her sexuality. Valerie Estelle Frankel argued that Gwen finds "the missing side of herself" with her immersion into the world of Torchwood, represented by "affairs and homosexuality and the threat of death" rather than her ordinary domestic life with Rhys. Daniel Rawcliffe noted that Indira Varma's character Suzie, featured in the premiere episode and in "They Keep Killing Suzie", is used as a "doppelgänger" for Gwen, (a trope of Gothic fiction – compare with the terms "Gothic double" and literary foil). Suzie's actions, and parallels with Gwen, help to illuminate some of Gwen's own ethically ambiguous decisions in the first series. Gwen must constantly fight against Suzie, and Suzie's example, "if she is to be proved worthy of working alongside Captain Jack". According to Frankel Gwen's confrontation with Suzie mirrored her confrontation with her "inner self"; her literal journey into death gave her "the wisdom and duality of both worlds, life and death, mundane and magical" and allowed her to become stronger.

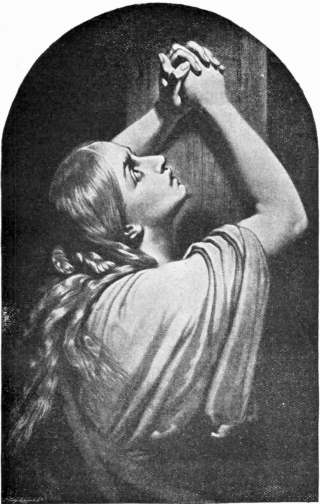
Mary Magdalene, painted by Ary Scheffer, in a dramatic display of penitence. Gwen has been described as the Mary Magdalene to Jack's Jesus.

Whilst Lynette Porter thought that Gwen became a "fallen woman" through her affair with Owen, she observed that this made Gwen's role in relation to Jack in "End of Days", analogous to that of Mary Magdalene to Jesus, reinforcing a prevalent biblical subtext. Gwen keeps a vigil at Jack's "Torchwood tomb" and like Magdalene is rewarded for her loyalty by being the first to lay eyes upon the risen saviour. Valerie Frankel surmised that "Gwen's journey is one we all face [...] she discovers the dominant intuition within, and then embraces it within the darkest caves of her inner self". David Cornelius stated that Gwen's Torchwood adventures take her to the brink, and additionally show "she's strong enough to pull herself back". Stephen James Walker also felt that Gwen is still a redeemable character because she recognises her own moral failings, as seen in "Combat" where she sits alone sobbing over pizza, before picking herself up and trying to do better in the future. On this track, Torchwood actor Kai Owen justified Gwen's treatment of Rhys in her darkest moments by arguing that Gwen's intentions always remained pure, no matter how badly she treated Rhys.

Ahead of the fourth series, Russell T Davies acknowledged that the character of Gwen can be both loved and hated by the audience. He stated that as an actress Myles isn't preoccupied with her character being presented in a sympathetic light, being able "to take that extraordinary deep breath and not care". io9's Charlie Jane Anders observed that the TV episode "The Categories of Life", written by Jane Espenson, exposed the character's "human vanity" by showing that she has "started to believe her own hype". In Anders' eyes, the character is responsible for her father's second heart attack because of her rash actions. Anders felt that later episodes in the fourth series continued to illuminate flaws in Gwen's character, describing her as someone with an "addictive personality" who "treats her Torchwood adventures like a drug that she craves" though she knows they "ruin her relationships with her husband and child".

=== Relationships ===
It would be a bridge too far — she wouldn't choose a job over (Rhys) in that circumstance... I'm glad that relationship is still intact. It's a show where you've got to contrast the ordinary everyday with the extraordinary.

— Executive Producer Julie Gardner, speaking in July 2008, explains why the production team chose not to kill off Rhys.

Much of Gwen's characterisation centers on her developing relationship with her partner Rhys. Eve Myles describes the character as Gwen's "normality base". The relationship is tested by Gwen's affair with colleague Owen Harper (Gorman), a betrayal which Myles believes to be "completely out of character" for Gwen, explaining that the guilt experienced over her actions tears her to pieces. The production team had originally planned for Rhys to die in the first series but he was given a reprieve. Producer Richard Stokes explains that Rhys' presence keeps Gwen from losing her "heart" and that without him "it simply becomes a sci-fi show about sci-fi people, running around and hunting aliens". Julie Gardner adds that in the discussion, the writers had felt they could not have written Gwen as ever recovering from Rhys' loss, and so chose not to kill off the character. In his analysis of Gwen, Daniel Rawcliffe opines that Rhys helps to keep her mental health intact, and argues that his presence prevents her from undergoing the same psychological deterioration as Suzie.

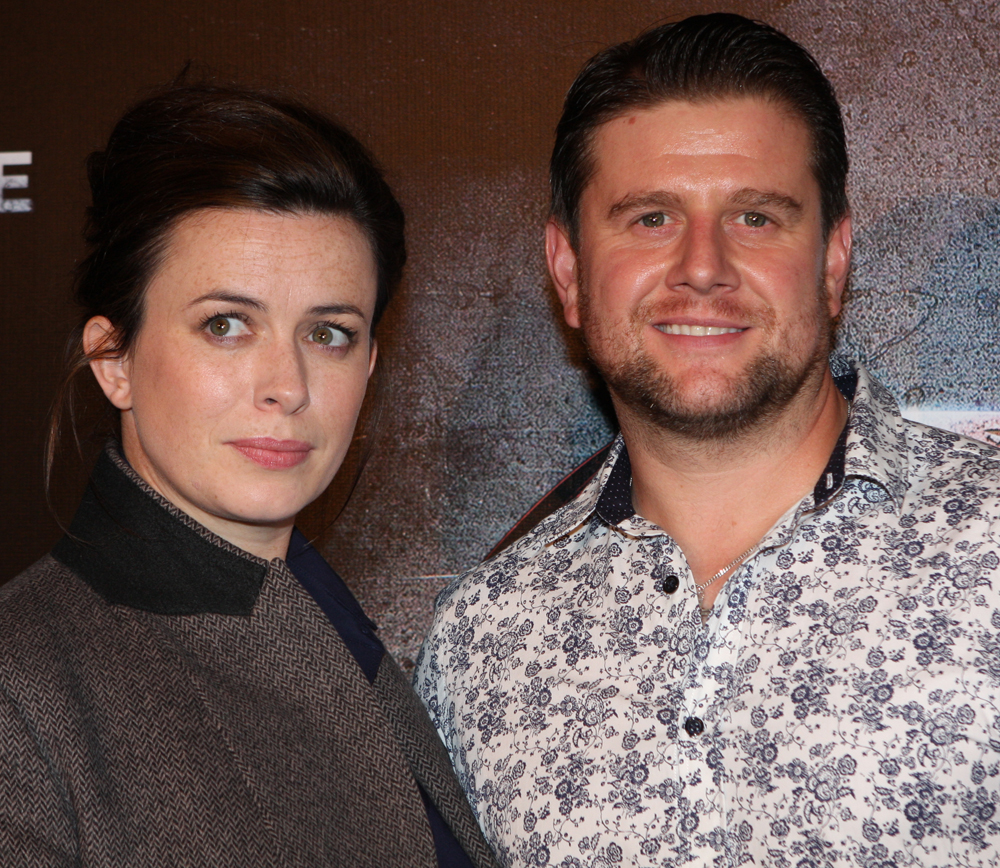
Eve Myles pictured with onscreen partner Kai Owen in 2013. Myles stated that Owen's character Rhys made Gwen more of a "strong character".

Despite her ongoing relationship with Rhys, the series explores possibilities of a romantic connection between Gwen and her boss Jack. In a 2007 interview, Eve Myles describes the relationship between Jack and Gwen as a "palpable love" and stated that "it's the real thing and they're going to make you wait for that." AfterElton's Locksley Hall interprets Jack's attraction to Gwen as being influenced by "her warmth, her sense of justice, her very ordinariness and lack of glamour", whilst Myles states of Gwen's interest in Jack that "the most monogamous woman in the world would probably go for him". Stephen James Walker quotes the firing range sequence in 2006 episode "Ghost Machine" as an example of romantic tension between the pair as well as the scene where Jack discovers Gwen engagement. Gwen remains monogamous during the second series and "fights every day to be with [Rhys]" even though Jack remains "a huge temptation". Her suspension between Jack and Rhys becomes a central theme; Valerie Frankel believes that Gwen is caught between "Rhys, the sweet, kind handsome prince, and Jack, the compelling trickster". She suggests that Jack is not mature enough to occupy the role of "steady prince" for Gwen. John Barrowman feels that if Jack were to settle down with her "he'd have to commit completely"; this is why he does not act on his feelings, because though Gwen would let him flirt with other people, he could "never afford to do anything more".

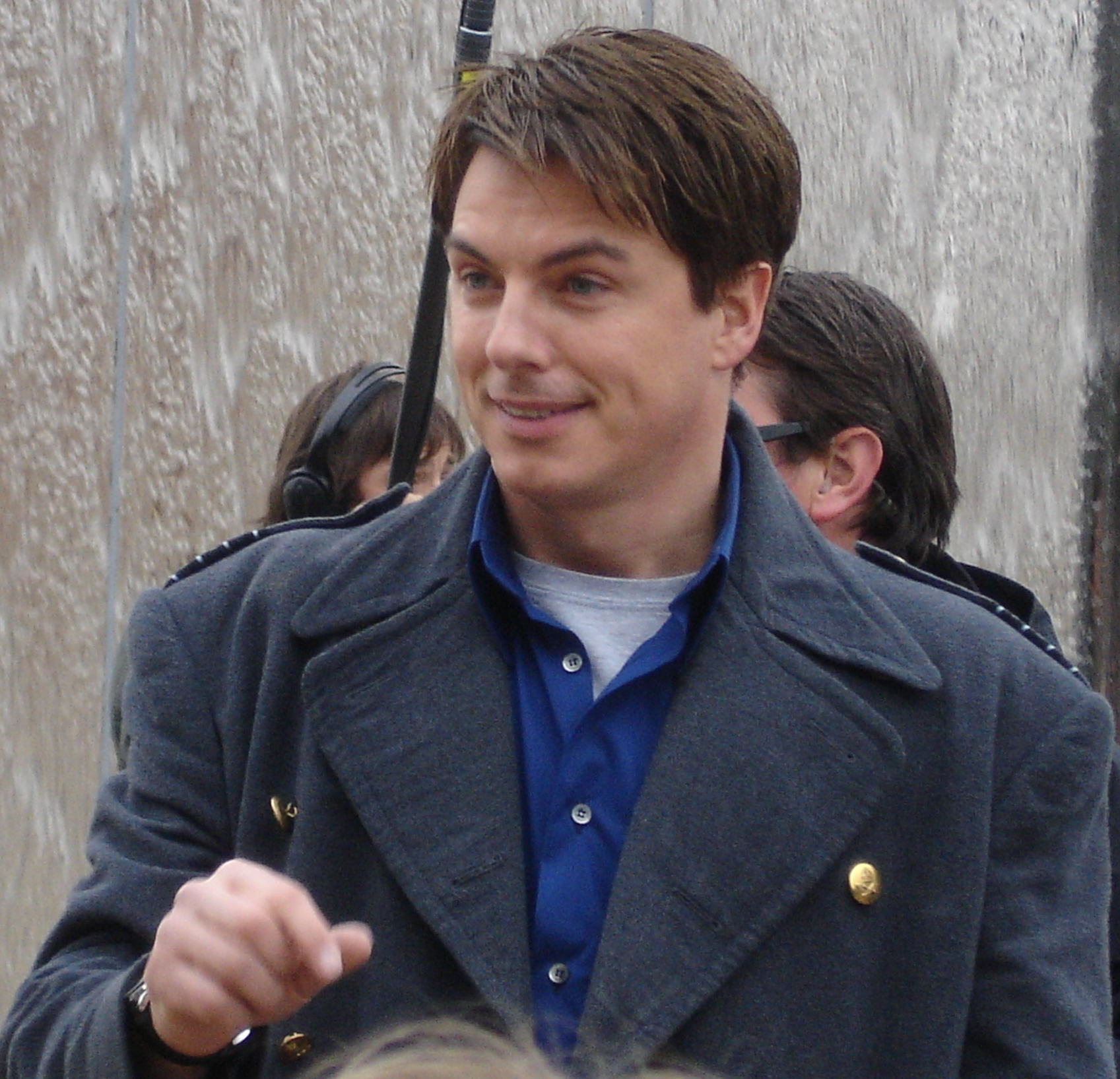
John Barrowman plays Gwen's boss, Jack Harkness, with whom she has a complicated relationship.

Stephen James Walker feels that Gwen's decision not to wipe Rhys' memory a second time in the episode "Meat" marks the end of any potential relationship between Gwen and Jack. As Davies felt it was essential that Rhys became enlightened to Gwen's true occupation, the episode "Meat" focused on Rhys discovering and coming to terms with Torchwood. Richard Edwards of SFX magazine comments that this development allows their relationship to become the most convincing on the show and makes it clear why Gwen would want to marry him. Ben Rawson-Jones of Digital Spy comments that overall, the relationship serves to create "a nice contrast with the fantastical elements of the show"; whilst Jason Hughes opines that their marriage is "handled in a painfully honest way" and serves as "a true definition of 'love' written with subtlety and perfection". When asked about her character's complex relationship with both Jack and Rhys, Myles explains that Gwen wouldn't be as much of a "strong character" without her ordinary life with Rhys. Davies felt that the relationship furthered the show's exploration of human sexuality stating that "open sexuality has to include everything" including "a husband/wife great big crime-fighting team ... happily in love".

In 2009 Myles stated that to have Jack and Gwen act on their feelings would be "like feeding the baby when it's not hungry". Reinforcing this view, Julie Gardner feels the love between Gwen and Jack to be self-evident and that it did not need to be spoken. Lynette Porter argues that Gwen's apotheosis of Jack causes him to flee Earth, as hero is a role he cannot play because he feels responsible for the deaths of those he loved. A press release ahead of the 2011 series stated that though Gwen retreats to a rural idyll with her family, she still retains feelings for Jack and misses the exciting life she once led alongside him. Ahead of the fourth series Myles explains that Gwen and Jack's relationship is a "love-hate-love relationship", which she believes to be reminiscent of, concurrently, a sibling relationship, a husband and wife relationship and "the best friendship known to mankind". Myles feels that Gwen is not complete without Jack and that they are like "two missing parts of a jigsaw" and because the relationship works on so many different levels it cannot be labelled. Episode seven of Miracle Day features a scene where Gwen states that she would have Jack killed to save her daughter. Writer Jane Espenson explains that the two characters' differing needs means that they inevitably "clash like steel blades".

=== Action hero and mother ===
Original lead writer Chris Chibnall feels Gwen develops into a stronger character between series one and series two, becoming less "wide-eyed" over events happening around her. Frankel writes that "she is a whole woman now, integrated with all the parts of herself". In the second series, Eve Myles states, Gwen now "knows where her feet are". Costume Designer Ray Holman explains that these developments are reflected in how the production team dresses the character. In the first series Gwen is dressed in a "faded high street look" and keeps away from leather clothing. As she becomes more confident in her new vocation, her clothes becomes "a lot more designer and heroic looking". In the second series she wears more leather from brands such as Diesel and G-star which Holman describes as "sexy" and "practical". The overall effect is that Gwen's leathers "toughen her up a bit, but keep her stylish at the same time". For fourth series Miracle Day, costume designer Shawna Trpcic declared her intention to take Eve Myles "out of the nunnery". Myles recalled vetoing a brassiere she was asked to wear because she felt it to be unnecessarily sexualised and impractical for action sequences. She added that she views Gwen as "a real woman" and "not about tits and arse".

Children of Earth director Euros Lyn remarks that by the third series Gwen has grown so that "she now is on a par with Jack, in terms of having the knowledge and the experience to make decisions and to be a heroine". Daniel Martin of The Guardian opines that her characterisation in the serial "shows just how far she's come", whilst Robert Lloyd of the Los Angeles Times feels that she is a "soulful leather-jacketed action heroine". Myles states that Gwen becomes a harsher character, but she feels that, "if she wasn't, people would die". David Cornelius observes that Gwen is no longer the kind-hearted outsider she was when she first joined Torchwood. By Children of Earth she has become "colder and much more aggressive". Her horrific experiences turn her into "a biting cynic"; when both government and army betray the British people, Gwen claims to understand finally why the Doctor does not save humanity from world crises. She believes he "must look at this planet and turn away in shame". A press release stated that Miracle Day had Gwen "make the most terrible decisions, on behalf of all mankind". This is evident in "The Blood Line", where her character is shown to be willing to sacrifice the entire Torchwood team, in addition to her dying father, for the good of the world. Commenting on Gwen's characterisation in this episode, Dan Martin notes that "Gwen sees transition into the Earth Mothering Tank Girl become complete, as she plays God and appears to love it."

A promotional image of Gwen defending herself and her daughter in "The New World". The production team chose to feature this scene heavily in advertising the fourth series.

Press releases describe Gwen in light of contradictions between her heroic and conventionally feminine roles in the series; despite becoming a "tough, ruthless warrior, who loves the thrill of the fight" Gwen remains a "funny, salty, earthy woman who loves home and family". Children of Earth sees Gwen become pregnant by husband Rhys; a storyline which IGN writer Asham Haque thought provided "one of the few hope-giving threads" in the serial. She gives birth to a baby girl, Anwen, between the third and fourth series. Both Eve Myles and creator Russell T Davies have described this plot development as emblematic of a contradiction at the heart of Gwen's character. Myles, believing that motherhood gives Gwen a greater sense of responsibility, says it makes Gwen "even more human, and yet even more of a wonder woman". Whilst talking about the show's fourth series, Davies suggested that it would be "irresistible" to use the image of "Gwen Cooper with baby in one arm and gun in the other" as promotion. The production team have continued to emphasise this contradictory aspect to Gwen's character, which has proved popular with critics and viewers. For example, a promotional clip for Miracle Day features Gwen firing from her gun in one hand while protectively holding her baby in the other. Zap2it's Mikey O'Connell praised this as one of the trailer's best aspects, praising Gwen as "the coolest mum ever." Reviewing the opening episodes of Miracle Day Mary McNamara of the Los Angeles Times identified "the dark humor" of the sequence as representative of "the top notes of the British Torchwood". The Daily Telegraph's Catherine Gee praised the dichotomy between the character's two roles, stating that "Eve Myles's homely yet badass agent is incredibly charming".

Critics have drawn comparisons with famous screen action heroines such as Ellen Ripley, portrayed by Sigourney Weaver in the original Alien trilogy. Ripley is seen as a ground-breaking depiction of a heroine, whose heroism is neither derived from male support nor hampered by femininity. Rawcliffe writes that Gwen's strength of character makes her a "half Ripley", insofar as she possesses all of Ripley's strength, and yet "is hampered by her reliance on the male characters of Jack, Rhys and Owen". Gwen has been compared, at least superficially, to Buffy Summers, as portrayed by Sarah Michelle Gellar. Reflecting on a scene from Miracle Day, one critic comments that Gwen is "channeling Season Two Buffy the Vampire Slayer" when she shoots at a helicopter from her bazooka (recalling the sequence depicted in Buffy episode "Innocence"). Gwen has attracted implicit comparisons with Lara Croft from the Tomb Raider video game and film franchise. Commenting on the first episode of Torchwood: Miracle Day Den of Geek's Simon Brew states that "whoever Hollywood producers cast in the planned reboot of the Tomb Raider movie franchise, I'm fully confident that Myles could kick their ass. Twice. Before breakfast." While critical of the typical portrayal of British female science fiction characters, The Guardian's Krystina Nellis singles out Gwen and Doctor Who's River Song (Alex Kingston) as positive depictions of strong female characters, stating, "It'd be difficult to find two superwomen in less need of a man to save them."

== Reception ==
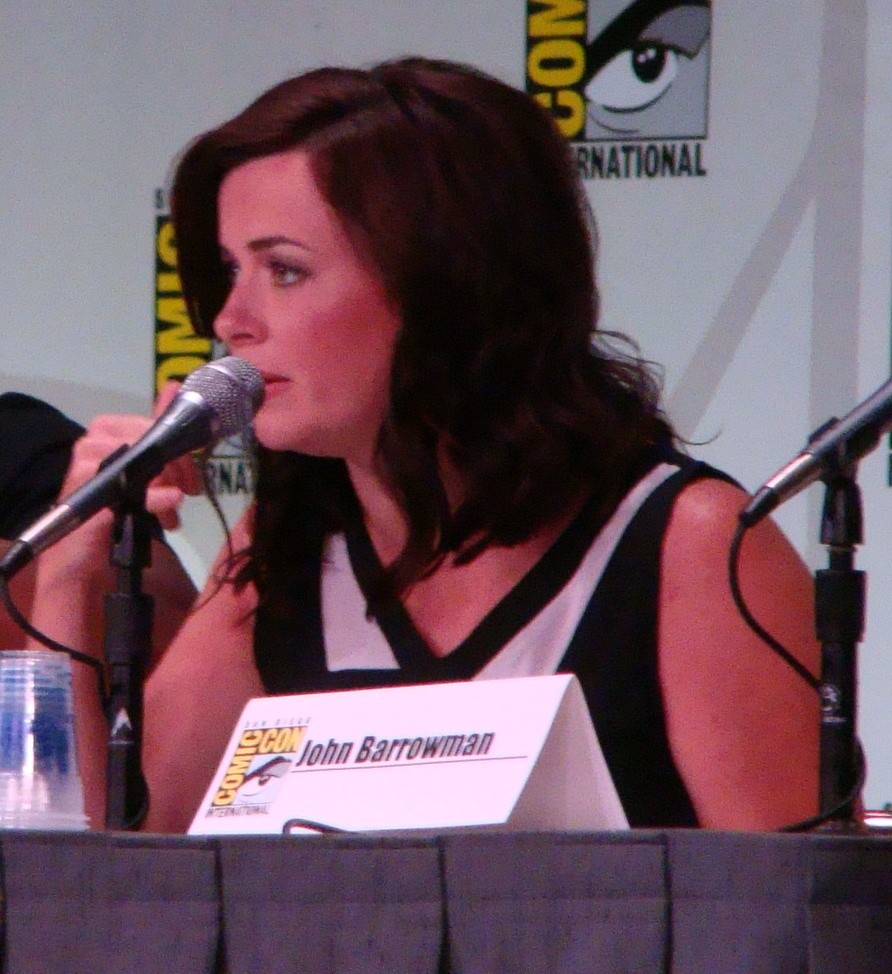
Myles has won both awards and critical notice for her role as Gwen Cooper.

Eve Myles has enjoyed an increased profile since being cast as Gwen Cooper in Torchwood and is now considered one of Wales' greatest drama exports. On casting her, Russell T Davies described Myles as "Wales best kept secret," and the actress has been described as a "Welsh icon" since appearing in Torchwood, with the Western Mail listing Myles' turn as "Torchwood's feisty female lead" as a contributing factor in making her one of Wales' sexiest women, as well as a national institution. In an analysis of Welsh representation in television, Geraint Telfan Davies cited Myles' role in Torchwood, coupled with the popularity of sitcom Gavin & Stacey, as combating prejudice against the Welsh accent. Backing up this claim, Samantha Bennet of the Pittsburgh Post-Gazette describes Myles' "silvery, flowing" accent as "exotic" and Myles herself as a bona fide star. Shortly after Torchwood's premiere, Conservative MP Michael Gove described Gwen Cooper as a "Celtic Rosselini" and an example of Welsh sensuality, while in 2006, Wales on Sunday named Myles as its "Bachelorette of the Year". In July 2011, The Scotsman's Aidan Smith described Gwen Cooper as "the sexiest woman in Wales".

The Guardian's "Organ Grinder" reviewer was full of praise for Myles' performance in "Everything Changes", expressing the opinion that, through her portrayal of Gwen Cooper, she managed to outshine Captain Jack. The character was described by The Stage as "the solid, down to earth character needed to anchor Torchwood to the real world" whilst functioning well as a foil to Captain Jack. Some reviews mocked the prosaic characterisation. Verity Stob, a technology columnist for online newspaper The Register, wrote a parody of Torchwood called Under Torch Wood (in the style of Dylan Thomas' Under Milk Wood). The piece mocks Gwen's role as "the viewer proxy" describing her as "plumply pop-eyed" and her boyfriend Rhys as 'Barry Backstory'. Jan Ravens played a parody version of Gwen in the impressionist television series Dead Ringers, in which she displays a badge labelling her with what Jon Culshaw's Captain Jack describes as her sole characteristic: Welsh. In November 2006 Jim Shelley from The Mirror stated Gwen to be "neither as interesting nor as sexy as she should be." A plot development that saw Gwen respond to the advances of an alien sex-gas in another woman's body was described by Karman Kregloe of AfterEllen as characterising "nearly every negative lesbian stereotype imaginable". Kregloe considers Gwen's inability to satiate the alien as a "play on a traditional, sexist social construct", and the fact that Gwen never again mentions this experience is also criticised.

The more assertive Gwen in Torchwood's third series attracted praise from reviewers: Paul Collins of Total Sci-Fi expressed the opinion that Children of Earth finally shows Gwen's heroic characteristics in a way that had been missing in the first two series, while Daniel Martin from the Guardian stated that "it's great to see Gwen being so completely badass". David Cornelius wrote that Gwen succeeds as a strongly written female character that does not pander to stereotypes because writers avoid defining her by any aspect of her adventures. Reviewers commented on Myles' standing as a leading lady: Comic Book Resources' Remy Minnick describes Gwen as "the true heart of Torchwood", while Scott Lewinski from Wired magazine described Myles' portrayal as the conscience of the Torchwood team, and the show itself. Total Sci-Fi's Jonathan Wilkins felt that the five-part serial marked the emergence of Eve Myles as a star in her own right and opined that she could potentially carry the show without co-star Barrowman. Maureen Ryan of the Chicago Tribune stated her belief that the third series' climax showed that Eve Myles has "grown into the role" of Gwen, describing her performance as "outstanding". Ryan later gave an "Honourable Mention" to Gwen when discussing Sci-Fi TV's Most Memorable Female Characters, making her the only Doctor Who franchise character to receive a mention. Critical response to the character remained positive in the fourth series. Gavin Fuller of The Daily Telegraph felt Myles "took the acting honours with a bravura performance", whilst Charlie Jane Anders stated Gwen to have the strongest moments in the finale which led to "a new appreciation for her character".

Eve Myles won the 2007 Bafta Cymru Award for Best Actress for her portrayal of Gwen Cooper, winning over the parent series' actress Billie Piper. She was nominated again for the award in 2008, and again in 2010. In 2010 Myles won the 'Best Actress" award in the SFX Reader's Awards poll, and was crowned best actress in the 11th annual Airlock Alpha Portal Awards. For her role as Gwen Cooper in Torchwood: Miracle Day Myles was nominated for a Satellite Award in the Best Television Actress category, and reached the shortlist for the 2012 UK National Television Awards. She has also received a nomination for Best Actress in Television at the 38th Saturn Awards, held in June 2012. Action figures of Gwen have been created in her likeness, which Myles' describes as "bizarre and wonderful" and at the same time "really kind of strange". In a reader's awards poll in the sixth issue of Torchwood Magazine, Gwen was voted second favourite Torchwood character behind Captain Jack, a ranking she received in a 2011 poll published by the Liverpool Daily Post as part of a live interview with writer John Fay. Myles, describing her experiences at various science-fiction conventions, has praised the fan response as "incredible" and "just extraordinary". Some fans have taken to blacking out their teeth at conventions to mimic her gap toothed appearance, which Myles finds particularly flattering.
