= Somnambulist (disambiguation) =

Somnambulist or The Somnambulist can refer to:

- a person who engages in somnambulism (sleepwalking)
- a term used in hypnosis to indicate someone of high enough suggestibility to follow suggestions without the need for a formal trance

== Books ==
- The Somnambulist, a novel by Jonathan Barnes (author)
- The title character in Don't Wake Up the Sleepwalker, a novel by Stefan Kisyov
- A zombie, as used in the novels The Zombie Survival Guide and World War Z

== Film and TV ==
- "Somnambulist" (Angel), a 2000 episode of the TV show Angel
- A central character by the name of Cesare, from the 1920 German silent horror film The Cabinet of Dr. Caligari

== Music ==
- Somnambulist (album), an album by American metal band Sicmonic
- Somnambulist, album by rock band Abandoned Pools

=== Songs ===
- "The Somnambulist", song by English rock band XTC 1979
- "The Fleeing Somnambulist", by Christian Death, written by Rozz Williams 1998
- "Somnambulist (Simply Being Loved)", a song by BT
- "Somnambulist", song by the Swedish artist Psilodump
- "Somnambulist", song by Australian rock band Blueline Medic
- "Somnambulist", song by DJ performance artist/producer/musician Mount Sims from The Album Wild Light
- "Like a Somnambulist in Daylight's Fire", a song by the German Black-metal band Dark Fortress
- "Somnambulist", a song by the EBM/Industrial band Suicide Commando

== See also ==
- La sonnambula (disambiguation)
- Sonámbulo (disambiguation)
