= Torchwood (audio drama series) =

Sci-fi audio series

Big Finish Productions audio drama
- Series: Torchwood
- Written by: various
- Directed by: Scott Handcock; Neil Gardner; Barnaby Edwards; Lisa Bowerman; Samuel Clemens; Steven Kavuma; David O'Mahony; Bethany Weimers
- Produced by: James Goss; David Richardson; Emily Cook; Scott Handcock; Alfie Shaw; John Ainsworth
- Executive producers: Jason Haigh-Ellery; Nicholas Briggs
- Release date: 15 September 2015 – present

Torchwood is a sci-fi audio series produced by Big Finish Productions based on the British television programme of the same name. Like the TV series, the dramas follow the exploits of the operatives who work for the Torchwood Institute, a fictional secret organisation that defends Earth against extraterrestrial threats.

The series premiered on 15 September 2015 and is set to conclude in October 2027. James Goss acts as range producer, David Richardson as senior producer, with Nicholas Briggs and Jason Haigh-Ellery serving as executive producers.

== Background ==
The original television programme Torchwood (2006–2011), an adult-oriented spin-off of the long-running British science fiction drama Doctor Who, ran for four series before entering an indefinite hiatus due to the other commitments of creator and executive producer Russell T Davies.

In January 2015, John Barrowman, who plays series lead Captain Jack Harkness, stated that there were plans for Torchwood to return as several audio plays that could potentially lead into a fifth television series, with Davies and co-executive producer Julie Gardner in discussion of the project. Torchwood previously featured in the form of radio plays that aired on BBC Radio 4 between 2008 and 2011.

In May 2015, Big Finish Productions announced plans to produce Torchwood audio plays after receiving the license to use characters and concepts from the revived era of Doctor Who and its associated spin-offs in their productions; the company was previously only permitted elements from the show's original series and TV film. The project received the blessing of Davies, who had been working with Gardner and former Big Finish producer Gary Russell to bring Torchwood to Big Finish since 2013.

The series premiered on 15 September 2015. Plays making up the Monthly Range were initially grouped by series: Series 1 (1–6) and Series 2 (7–12) were released monthly up until August 2016, with a third set (13–18) released between March–August 2017, a fourth (19–24) in March–August 2018, a fifth (25–36) in March 2019–February 2020, a sixth (37–48) in April 2020–March 2021, a seventh (49–60) in April 2021–April 2022, an eighth (61–73) in May 2022–April 2023, a ninth (74–84) in August 2023–June 2024, a tenth (85–96) in July 2024–September 2025 and an eleventh and final set (97–100) between November 2025–May 2026. Story-wise, each play centres on one or more members of Torchwood and their associates.

Additionally, specials featuring ensemble casts have also been released. The first, The Torchwood Archive, was released in October 2016 to commemorate the tenth anniversary of Torchwood's TV debut. This was followed by the boxsets Outbreak (2016) and Believe (2018), while another, Torchwood One (2017–2024), spun out into its own sub-series. The series The Story Continues, marketed as a direct continuation of the TV programme, began with the three-part release Aliens Among Us in 2017, while the boxset The Sins of Captain John and another series, Torchwood Soho, both premiered in 2020.

On 6 October 2025, Big Finish announced that the Torchwood Monthly Range would cease after its one-hundredth official release in 2026 while the audio series itself would conclude with a two-volume special titled Legacy in 2027.

== Premise ==
The series follows the exploits of the agents who work for the fictional Torchwood Institute – a covert British organisation that defends Earth against supernatural and extraterrestrial threats and salvages alien technology for their own use. Like the television series, the audio dramas primarily focus on a team of operatives based at the organisation's Cardiff division, Torchwood Three, while occasionally fixating on their associates as well as agents from other branches of the institute. Time period-wise, each play is set at a different point in Torchwood's history, ranging from its founding in the Victorian Era to the early 21st century and beyond. Certain plays also take place during events from the TV series.

A story arc central to the series revolves around a group of aliens called the Committee, who appear to have been secretly manipulating humanity since the turn of the 20th century. Despite their existence being perceived as a conspiracy, Torchwood have made efforts to foil their schemes, only to discover that the Committee have larger plans in force.

== Cast and characters ==
=== Regular cast ===
List indicator

This section includes characters who will appear or have appeared in at least one season.

- A green cell indicates the actor is a main cast member.
- A red cell indicates the actor is a recurring cast member.
- A light blue cell indicates the actor is a guest or special guest cast member.

Actor	Character	Appearances																									
Actor	Character	Monthly Range												Specials	Torchwood One					The Story Continues			The Sins of Captain John	Torchwood Soho			
Actor	Character	'15	'16	'17	'18	'19	'20	'21	'22	'23	'24	'25	'26	Specials	1	2	3	4	5	1	2	3	The Sins of Captain John	1	2	3	4
John Barrowman	Jack Harkness	✓	✓		✓	✓								✓						✓	✓		✓				
Eve Myles	Gwen Cooper	✓	✓		✓	✓	✓							✓						✓	✓	✓					
Gareth David-Lloyd	Ianto Jones	✓	✓	✓	✓	✓	✓	✓	✓	✓	✓	✓	✓	✓	✓	✓	✓	✓	✓			✓					
Naoko Mori	Toshiko Sato		✓	✓	✓	✓	✓	✓	✓		✓			✓													
Burn Gorman	Owen Harper			✓	✓	✓	✓	✓						✓													
Kai Owen	Rhys Williams	✓	✓	✓	✓	✓	✓		✓	✓	✓			✓						✓	✓	✓					
Tom Price	Andy Davidson	✓	✓	✓	✓	✓	✓	✓	✓	✓	✓	✓		✓						✓	✓	✓		✓	✓	✓	✓
Indira Varma	Suzie Costello		✓			✓				✓	✓	✓		✓													
Tracy-Ann Oberman	Yvonne Hartman	✓						✓ (Note: Parallel Earth variant.)				✓		✓	✓	✓	✓	✓	✓	✓	✓	✓					
Samuel Barnett	Norton Folgate		✓		✓			✓	✓		✓		✓	✓							✓			✓	✓	✓	✓
Rowena Cooper	Queen Victoria		✓		✓	✓	✓		✓					✓													
James Marsters	John Hart				✓																		✓				
Murray Melvin	Bilis Manger				✓	✓		✓	✓	✓										✓		✓					
Paul Clayton	St John Colchester							✓	✓		✓			✓						✓	✓	✓					
Sophie Aldred	Dorothy McShane							✓	✓		✓																
Timothy Bentinck	Tommy Pierce										✓	✓	✓		✓	✓	✓	✓	✓								
Alexandria Riley	Ng																			✓	✓	✓					
Jonny Green	Tyler Steele											✓								✓	✓	✓					
Samantha Béart	Orr																			✓	✓	✓					
Ramon Tikaram	Colin Colchester-Price																			✓	✓						
Joplin Sibtain	Colin Colchester-Price																					✓					
Dervla Kerwin	Lizbeth Hayhoe							✓																✓	✓	✓	✓
Joe Shire	Gideon Lyme																							✓	✓	✓	✓

=== Notable guests ===
==== Torchwood and Doctor Who ====
- Julian Lewis Jones as Alex Hopkins
- Nerys Hughes as Brenda Williams
- Sharon Morgan as Mary Cooper
- Katy Manning as Jo Jones
- Annette Badland as Margaret Blaine
- Freema Agyeman as Martha Jones
- David Tennant as the Tenth Doctor (Note: 1. 50: "Absent Friends" was originally set to be released in May 2021, but was ultimately removed from the schedule in the wake of allegations of misconduct by John Barrowman. #50X: "The Black Knight" serves as a replacement.)
- Bryan Dick as Adam Smith
- Shaun Parkes as Zachary Cross Flane
- Claire Rushbrook as Ida Scott
- Ronny Jhutti as Danny Bartock
- Silas Carson as The Ood

==== Other ====
- John Sessions as George Wilson
- Russell T Davies as Secretary
- David Warner as The Committee
- Simon Russell Beale as M LeDuc
- Arthur Darvill as Frank Layton
- Jacqueline King as God
- Michael Palin as The Voice
- David Troughton as Rigsby
- Kacey Ainsworth as Jill Kerr
- Denis Lawson as Casper Beacham
- Nathaniel Curtis as Lancelyn Green and Vijay
- Dan Starkey as Major Kreg
- Nigel Havers as The SUV
- Louise Jameson as Roberta Craven
- Omari Douglas as Neal Hart
- Rebecca Trehearn as Anna
- Rosalie Craig as Sophie
- Janet Ellis as Janet
- Greg Austin as Armitage
- Wilf Scolding as Sir Reginald Dellafield
- Jason Watkins as Emlyn Crook
- Fenella Woolgar as Princess Beatrice

== Production ==
The series is produced by James Goss, with Jason Haigh-Ellery and Nicholas Briggs serving as executive producers. Most of the series was originally directed by Scott Handcock before he left Big Finish in 2022, since then, most plays have been directed by either David O'Mahony or Lisa Bowerman, while others contribute infrequently. Original music is composed by Blair Mowat. Scripts were initially edited by Steve Tribe before the duty was passed to David Llewellyn and Handcock, and later David Winfield, Lauren Mooney and Goss by 2022. Likewise, all cover art was originally designed by Lee Binding before Sean Longmore took over in 2021.

Plays have been recorded in studios across the UK and the U.S., including Rancho Mirage Music, Bang Post Production, The Moat Studios, The Roundhouse Studios and Ladbroke Audio. During the COVID-19 pandemic, production was carried out remotely from cast and crew's homes. Later, when studio recording was re-permitted, cast and crew had to observe social distancing rules.

One play is typically recorded in 1–2 days and released within 6–18 months, with post production taking place in the time between. They debut through Big Finish's website for digital download and physical purchase before becoming commercially available three months later, as with all Big Finish releases. Each audio drama features an approximate 60 minute runtime, including a 5–10 minute behind-the-scenes segment. Exceptions, however, include the Torchwood Soho series with 30 minute episodes and the supplementary Postcard from Mr. Colchester stories which each have a 20 minute runtime.

== Releases ==
=== Monthly Range (2015–2026) ===
==== 2015 ====
No.	Title	Directed by	Written by	Featuring	Released
1	"The Conspiracy"	Scott Handcock	David Llewellyn	Jack Harkness	September 2015
2	"Fall to Earth"	Scott Handcock	James Goss	Ianto Jones	October 2015
3	"Forgotten Lives"	Scott Handcock	Emma Reeves	Gwen Cooper, Rhys Williams	November 2015
4	"One Rule"	Barnaby Edwards	Joseph Lidster	Yvonne Hartman, Gwen Cooper, (Note: Cameo appearance.) Andy Davidson	December 2015

==== 2016 ====
No.	Title	Directed by	Written by	Featuring	Released
5	"Uncanny Valley"	Neil Gardner	David Llewellyn	Jack Harkness	January 2016
6	"More Than This"	Scott Handcock	Guy Adams	Gwen Cooper, Andy Davidson	February 2016
7	"The Victorian Age"	Scott Handcock	AK Benedict	Jack Harkness, Queen Victoria	March 2016
8	"Zone 10"	Scott Handcock	David Llewellyn	Toshiko Sato	April 2016
9	"Ghost Mission"	Scott Handcock	James Goss	Andy Davidson, Norton Folgate	May 2016
10	"Moving Target"	Scott Handcock	Guy Adams	Suzie Costello	June 2016
11	"Broken"	Scott Handcock	Joseph Lidster	Jack Harkness, Ianto Jones	July 2016
12	"Made You Look"	Scott Handcock	Guy Adams	Gwen Cooper, Rhys Williams	August 2016

==== 2017 ====
No.	Title	Directed by	Written by	Featuring	Released
13	"Visiting Hours"	Scott Handcock	David Llewellyn	Rhys Williams, Brenda Williams	March 2017
14	"The Dollhouse"	Lisa Bowerman	Juno Dawson	Marlow Sweet, Charley Du Bujeau, Gabi Martinez	April 2017
15	"Corpse Day"	Scott Handcock	James Goss	Owen Harper, Andy Davidson	May 2017
16	"torchwood_cascade_CDrip.tor"	Scott Handcock	Scott Handcock	Toshiko Sato	June 2017
17	"The Office of Never Was"	Scott Handcock	James Goss	Ianto Jones	July 2017
18	"The Dying Room"	Scott Handcock	Lizzie Hopley	M LeDuc, Herr Grau	August 2017

==== 2018 ====
No.	Title	Directed by	Written by	Featuring	Released
19	"The Death of Captain Jack"	Scott Handcock	David Llewellyn	Jack Harkness, John Hart, Gwen Cooper, Ianto Jones, Rhys Williams, Andy Davidson, Queen Victoria	March 2018
20	"The Last Beacon"	Scott Handcock	Gareth David-Lloyd	Owen Harper, Ianto Jones	April 2018
21	"We Always Get Out Alive"	Scott Handcock	Guy Adams	Gwen Cooper, Rhys Williams	May 2018
22	"Goodbye Piccadilly"	Scott Handcock	James Goss	Andy Davidson, Norton Folgate	June 2018
23	"Instant Karma"	Lisa Bowerman	David Llewellyn, James Goss, Jonathan Morris	Toshiko Sato	July 2018
24	"Deadbeat Escape"	Scott Handcock	James Goss	Bilis Manger	August 2018

==== 2019 ====
No.	Title	Directed by	Written by	Featuring	Released
25	"Night of the Fendahl"	Scott Handcock	Tim Foley	Gwen Cooper, Fendahl	March 2019
26	"The Green Life"	Scott Handcock	David Llewellyn	Jack Harkness, Jo Jones	April 2019
27	"Sync"	Scott Handcock	Lisa McMullin	Suzie Costello, Margaret Blaine	May 2019
28	"Sargasso"	Scott Handcock	Christopher Cooper	Rhys Williams, Autons	June 2019
29	"Serenity"	Scott Handcock	James Moran	Jack Harkness, Ianto Jones	July 2019
30	"The Hope"	Scott Handcock	James Goss	Owen Harper, Andy Davidson	August 2019
31	"The Vigil"	Lisa Bowerman	Lou Morgan	Toshiko Sato	September 2019
32	"Smashed"	Scott Handcock	James Goss	Gwen Cooper	October 2019
33	"Dead Man's Switch"	Scott Handcock	David Llewellyn	Bilis Manger	November 2019
34	"Expectant"	Scott Handcock	Xanna Eve Chown	Jack Harkness, Ianto Jones	December 2019

==== 2020 ====
No.	Title	Directed by	Written by	Featuring	Released
35	"Fortitude"	Lisa Bowerman	James Goss	Queen Victoria	January 2020
36	"Dissected"	Scott Handcock	Tim Foley	Martha Jones, Gwen Cooper	February 2020
37	"Tropical Beach Sounds and Other Relaxing Seascapes #4"	Scott Handcock	Tim Foley	The Voice	April 2020
38	"Iceberg"	Scott Handcock	Grace Knight	Owen Harper	May 2020
39	"Dinner and a Show"	Scott Handcock	Gareth David-Lloyd	Ianto Jones, Toshiko Sato	June 2020
40	"Save Our Souls"	Lisa Bowerman	Scott Handcock	Queen Victoria	July 2020
41	"Red Base"	Lisa Bowerman	James Goss	Andy Davidson	August 2020
42	"Ex Machina"	Scott Handcock	Alfie Shaw	Ianto Jones	September 2020
43	"The Three Monkeys"	Scott Handcock	James Goss	Owen Harper, Andy Davidson	October 2020
44	"Rhys and Ianto's Excellent Barbecue"	Scott Handcock	Tim Foley	Ianto Jones, Rhys Williams	November 2020
45	"The Crown"	Lisa Bowerman	Jonathan Barnes	Queen Victoria	December 2020

==== 2021 ====
No.	Title	Directed by	Written by	Featuring	Released
46	"Coffee"	Scott Handcock	James Goss	Ianto Jones, Andy Davidson	January 2021
47	"Drive"	Lisa Bowerman	David Llewellyn	Toshiko Sato	February 2021
48	"Lease of Life"	Scott Handcock	Aaron Lamont	Owen Harper	March 2021
49	"Gooseberry"	Scott Handcock	James Goss	Owen Harper, Andy Davidson	April 2021
50	"Absent Friends"	Scott Handcock	James Goss	Jack Harkness, Ianto Jones, Tenth Doctor	N/A
51	"The Five People You Kill in Middlesbrough"	Scott Handcock	Yvonne Hartman (Note: Pseudonym for Tracy-Ann Oberman, Tim Foley & James Goss.)	Yvonne Hartman	June 2021
52	"Madam, I'm"	Scott Handcock	James Goss	Norton Folgate, Lizbeth Hayhoe, Adam Smith	July 2021
53	"Empire of Shadows"	Scott Handcock	James Goss	Zachary Cross Flane	August 2021
54	"Curios"	Scott Handcock	James Goss	Bilis Manger	September 2021
55	"The Great Sontaran War"	Lisa Bowerman	James Goss	Ianto Jones, Major Kreg	October 2021
56	"The Red List"	Scott Handcock	James Goss	St John Colchester, Dorothy McShane	November 2021
57	"The Grey Mare"	Lisa Bowerman	Lauren Mooney, Stewart Pringle	Ianto Jones	December 2021

==== 2022 ====
No.	Title	Directed by	Written by	Featuring	Released
58	"Cadoc Point"	Lisa Bowerman	David Llewellyn	Andy Davidson	January 2022
59	"Sonny"	Lisa Bowerman	Lizzie Hopley	Rhys Williams, Brenda Williams	February 2022
50X	"The Black Knight"	Scott Handcock	Lizbeth Myles	Norton Folgate	March 2022
60	"Infidel Places"	Lisa Bowerman	Una McCormack	Queen Victoria	April 2022
61	"War Chest"	Samuel Clemens	Rossa McPhillips	Toshiko Sato	May 2022
62	"Dead Plates"	Lisa Bowerman	David Llewellyn	Bilis Manger	June 2022
63	"Restricted Items Archive: Entries 031-049"	Steven Kavuma	Maddie Wilson	Ianto Jones	July 2022
64	"Suckers"	Lisa Bowerman	Alexander Stewart	Toshiko Sato	August 2022
65X (Note: Released as a free exclusive download.)	"A Postcard from Mr. Colchester"	N/A	James Goss	St John Colchester	September 2022
65	"Death in Venice"	Steven Kavuma	James Goss	St John Colchester, Dorothy McShane	September 2022
66	"SUV"	Lisa Bowerman	Ash Darby	Ianto Jones, Toshiko Sato	October 2022
67	"The Lincolnshire Poacher"	Lisa Bowerman	Lauren Mooney, Stewart Pringle	Ianto Jones	November 2022
68	"The Empire Man"	Lisa Bowerman	Jonathan Barnes	Queen Victoria	December 2022

==== 2023 ====
No.	Title	Directed by	Written by	Featuring	Released
69	"Double – Part 1"	Barnaby Edwards	Guy Adams	Roberta Craven, Autons	January 2023
70	"Double – Part 2"	Barnaby Edwards	Guy Adams	Roberta Craven, Autons	January 2023
71	"The Last Love Song of Suzie Costello"	Steven Kavuma	Rafaella Marcus	Suzie Costello	February 2023
72	"The Thirst Trap"	David O'Mahony	Tom Price	Andy Davidson, Rhys Williams	March 2023
73	"Launch Date"	Lisa Bowerman	Aaron Lamont	Ianto Jones	April 2023
74	"Sigil"	Lisa Bowerman	Ash Darby	Bilis Manger (Note: This story was recorded prior to Murray Melvin's death on April 14, 2023. It was released posthumously.)	August 2023
75	"Dog Hop"	Bethany Weimers	Lauren Mooney, Stewart Pringle	Andy Davidson	September 2023
76	"Odyssey"	Lisa Bowerman	Patrick O’Connor	Ida Scott, Ood	October 2023
77	"Oodunnit"	Bethany Weimers	James Goss	Zachary Cross Flane, Ood	November 2023
78	"Oracle"	Lisa Bowerman	Ash Darby	Danny Bartock, Ood	December 2023

==== 2024 ====
No.	Title	Directed by	Written by	Featuring	Released
79	"Poppet"	Lisa Bowerman	Lauren Mooney, Stewart Pringle	Rhys Williams	January 2024
80X	"Another Postcard from Mr. Colchester"	N/A	James Goss	St John Colchester	February 2024
80	"Sabotage"	Lisa Bowerman	James Goss	St John Colchester, Dorothy McShane	February 2024
81	"Tube Strike"	David O'Mahony	Gareth David-Lloyd	Ianto Jones, Tommy Pierce	March 2024
82	"Missing Molly"	Lisa Bowerman	Gareth David-Lloyd	Ianto Jones	April 2024
83	"Disco"	Lisa Bowerman	Gareth David-Lloyd	Ianto Jones	May 2024
84	"The Restoration of Catherine"	Bethany Weimers	James Goss	Andy Davidson, Norton Folgate	June 2024
85	"Art Decadence"	Scott Handcock	Ash Darby	Sir Reginald Dellafield, A.C. Forster, Mara	July 2024
86	"End Game"	Scott Handcock	Tom Black	Toshiko Sato	August 2024
87	"The Hollow Choir"	Bethany Weimers	Helen Marshall, Malcolm Devlin	Rhys Williams	September 2024
88	"Widdershins"	Lisa Bowerman	Guy Adams	Iain	October 2024
89	"Bad Connection"	David O'Mahony	Aaron Lamont	Suzie Costello, Emlyn Crook	November 2024
90X	"A Christmas Card from Mr Colchester"	N/A	James Goss	St John Colchester	December 2024
90	"Reflect"	Lisa Bowerman	Joseph Lidster	St John Colchester, Dorothy McShane	December 2024

==== 2025 ====
No.	Title	Directed by	Written by	Featuring	Released
91	"Ianto's Inferno"	Lisa Bowerman	Roland Moore	Ianto Jones	January 2025
92	"Inseparable"	Lisa Bowerman	Helen Marshall, Malcolm Devlin	Yvonne Hartman, Tommy Pierce	February 2025
93	"Rictus"	Lisa Bowerman	James Goss	Princess Beatrice, Zygons	March 2025
94	"The Boy Who Never Laughed"	Scott Handcock	Joseph Lidster	Tyler Steele	May 2025
95	"Child Free"	David O'Mahony	Holly Robinson, George Fletcher	Suzie Costello	July 2025
96	"Salvage"	Lisa Bowerman	Gareth David-Lloyd	The SUV	September 2025
97	"The Flawless Man"	David O'Mahony	Lauren Mooney, Stewart Pringle	Andy Davidson	November 2025

==== 2026 ====
No.	Title	Directed by	Written by	Featuring	Released
98	"Everyone's Dead on Floor 3"	Scott Handcock	James Goss	Norton Folgate	January 2026
99	"Curtain"	Scott Handcock	James Goss	Bilis Manger	March 2026
100	"Fare Well"	Scott Handcock	Joseph Lidster	Ianto Jones, Tommy Pierce, Cybermen	May 2026

=== Special releases ===
==== Specials (2016–2018) ====
No.	Title	Directed by	Written by	Featuring	Released
1	"The Torchwood Archive"	Scott Handcock	James Goss	Jack, Gwen, Ianto, Toshiko, Suzie, Rhys, Andy, Yvonne, Norton, Colchester, Alex, Queen Victoria	October 2016
2	"Outbreak"	Scott Handcock	Guy Adams, Emma Reeves, AK Benedict	Jack, Gwen, Ianto	November 2016
3	"Believe"	Scott Handcock	Guy Adams	Jack, Gwen, Ianto, Toshiko, Owen	April 2018

==== The Sins of Captain John (2020) ====
No.	Title	Directed by	Written by	Featuring	Released
1	"The Restored"	Scott Handcock	David Llewellyn	John, Jack	January 2020
2	"Escape from Nebazz"	Scott Handcock	David Llewellyn	John, Jack	January 2020
3	"Peach Blossom Heights"	Scott Handcock	David Llewellyn	John, Jack	January 2020
4	"Darker Purposes"	Scott Handcock	David Llewellyn	John, Jack	January 2020

==== Legacy (2027) ====
No.	Title	Directed by	Written by	Featuring	Released
Volume 1: The Living Will Fall
1	"Cornucopia"	Scott Handcock	Tim Foley	Norton, Orr, Colchester, Tyler, Yvonne, Andy, Ng, Dorothy McShane	September 2027
2	"Meet Lonely"	Scott Handcock	James Goss	Norton, Orr, Colchester, Tyler, Yvonne, Andy, Ng, Dorothy McShane	September 2027
3	"Yvonne Hartman's Ultimate Weapon"	Scott Handcock	Gareth David-Lloyd	Norton, Orr, Colchester, Tyler, Yvonne, Andy, Ng, Dorothy McShane	September 2027
4	"The Corn Mother"	Scott Handcock	William Carroll	Norton, Orr, Colchester, Tyler, Yvonne, Andy, Ng, Dorothy McShane	September 2027
5	"Hitler's Last Secret"	Scott Handcock	James Goss	Norton, Orr, Colchester, Tyler, Yvonne, Andy, Ng, Dorothy McShane	September 2027
6	"Pangea"	Scott Handcock	Ash Darby	Norton, Orr, Colchester, Tyler, Yvonne, Andy, Ng, Dorothy McShane	September 2027
Volume 2: The Dead Shall Rise
7	"Roberta's Gone to Iceland"	Scott Handcock	Guy Adams	Colchester, Ianto, Tyler, Roberta Craven, Yvonne, Rhys, Andy, Ng	October 2027
8	"What It Is to Lose"	Scott Handcock	Tim Foley	Colchester, Ianto, Tyler, Roberta Craven, Yvonne, Rhys, Andy, Ng	October 2027
9	"Viking Funeral"	Scott Handcock	Guy Adams	Colchester, Ianto, Tyler, Roberta Craven, Yvonne, Rhys, Andy, Ng	October 2027
10	"Hullaballoo"	Scott Handcock	Ash Darby	Colchester, Ianto, Tyler, Roberta Craven, Yvonne, Rhys, Andy, Ng	October 2027
11	"Torchwood's Last Stand"	Scott Handcock	Patrick O'Connor	Colchester, Ianto, Tyler, Roberta Craven, Yvonne, Rhys, Andy, Ng	October 2027
12	"Rainbow Bridge"	Scott Handcock	James Goss	Colchester, Ianto, Tyler, Roberta Craven, Yvonne, Rhys, Andy, Ng	October 2027

=== Torchwood One (2017–2024) ===
==== Series 1: Before the Fall (2017) ====
No.	Title	Directed by	Written by	Featuring	Released
1	"New Girl"	Barnaby Edwards	Joseph Lidster	Yvonne, Ianto, Tommy	January 2017
2	"Through the Ruins"	Barnaby Edwards	Jenny T Colgan	Yvonne, Ianto, Tommy	January 2017
3	"Uprising"	Barnaby Edwards	Matt Fitton	Yvonne, Ianto, Tommy	January 2017

==== Series 2: Machines (2018) ====
No.	Title	Directed by	Written by	Featuring	Released
1	"The Law Machines"	Barnaby Edwards	Matt Fitton	Yvonne, Ianto, Tommy	July 2018
2	"Blind Summit"	Barnaby Edwards	Gareth David-Lloyd	Yvonne, Ianto, Tommy	July 2018
3	"9 to 5"	Barnaby Edwards	Tim Foley	Yvonne, Ianto, Tommy	July 2018

==== Series 3: Latter Days (2019) ====
No.	Title	Directed by	Written by	Featuring	Released
1	"Retirement Plan"	Barnaby Edwards	Gareth David-Lloyd	Yvonne, Ianto, Tommy	September 2019
2	"Locker 15"	Barnaby Edwards	Matt Fitton	Yvonne, Ianto, Tommy	September 2019
3	"The Rockery"	Barnaby Edwards	Tim Foley	Yvonne, Ianto, Tommy	September 2019

==== Series 4: Nightmares (2022) ====
No.	Title	Directed by	Written by	Featuring	Released
1	"My Guest Tonight"	Scott Handcock	Tim Foley	Yvonne, Ianto, Tommy	April 2022
2	"Lola"	Scott Handcock	Rochana Patel	Yvonne, Ianto, Tommy	April 2022
3	"Less Majesty"	Scott Handcock	James Goss	Yvonne, Ianto, Tommy	April 2022

==== Series 5: I Hate Mondays (2024) ====
No.	Title	Directed by	Written by	Featuring	Released
1	"Dinner for Yvonne"	Scott Handcock	James Goss (Note: From a story by James Goss and Joseph Lidster.)	Yvonne, Ianto, Tommy	May 2024
2	"By Royal Appointment"	Scott Handcock	James Goss	Yvonne, Ianto, Tommy	May 2024
3	"Nerves"	Scott Handcock	Joseph Lidster	Yvonne, Ianto, Tommy	May 2024

=== The Story Continues (2017–2023) ===
This series is marketed as a direct continuation of the TV programme, with Aliens Among Us, God Among Us and Among Us serving as the fifth, sixth and seventh series, respectively.

==== Aliens Among Us (2017–2018) ====
No.	Title	Directed by	Written by	Featuring	Released
Part 1
1	"Changes Everything"	Scott Handcock	James Goss	Jack, Gwen/Ng, Rhys, Colchester, Tyler, Orr, Ro-Jedda, Sorvix	August 2017
2	"Aliens & Sex & Chips & Gravy"	Scott Handcock	James Goss	Jack, Gwen/Ng, Rhys, Colchester, Tyler, Orr, Ro-Jedda, Sorvix	August 2017
3	"Orr"	Scott Handcock	Juno Dawson	Jack, Gwen/Ng, Rhys, Colchester, Tyler, Orr, Ro-Jedda, Sorvix	August 2017
4	"Superiority Complex"	Scott Handcock	AK Benedict	Jack, Gwen/Ng, Rhys, Colchester, Tyler, Orr, Ro-Jedda, Sorvix	August 2017
Part 2
5	"Love Rat"	Scott Handcock	Christopher Cooper	Jack, Gwen/Ng, Rhys, Andy, Colchester, Tyler, Orr, Ro-Jedda, Sorvix, Bilis, Yvonne	October 2017
6	"A Kill to a View"	Scott Handcock	Mac Rogers	Jack, Gwen/Ng, Rhys, Andy, Colchester, Tyler, Orr, Ro-Jedda, Sorvix, Bilis, Yvonne	October 2017
7	"Zero Hour"	Scott Handcock	Janine H Jones	Jack, Gwen/Ng, Rhys, Andy, Colchester, Tyler, Orr, Ro-Jedda, Sorvix, Bilis, Yvonne	October 2017
8	"The Empty Hand"	Scott Handcock	Tim Foley	Jack, Gwen/Ng, Rhys, Andy, Colchester, Tyler, Orr, Ro-Jedda, Sorvix, Bilis, Yvonne	October 2017
Part 3
9	"Poker Face"	Scott Handcock	Tim Foley	Jack, Gwen/Ng, Yvonne, Rhys, Andy, Colchester, Tyler, Orr, Ro-Jedda, Sorvix	February 2018
10	"Tagged"	Scott Handcock	Joseph Lidster	Jack, Gwen/Ng, Yvonne, Rhys, Andy, Colchester, Tyler, Orr, Ro-Jedda, Sorvix	February 2018
11	"Escape Room"	Scott Handcock	Helen Goldwyn	Jack, Gwen/Ng, Yvonne, Rhys, Andy, Colchester, Tyler, Orr, Ro-Jedda, Sorvix	February 2018
12	"Herald of the Dawn"	Scott Handcock	James Goss	Jack, Gwen/Ng, Yvonne, Rhys, Andy, Colchester, Tyler, Orr, Ro-Jedda, Sorvix	February 2018

==== God Among Us (2018–2019) ====
No.	Title	Directed by	Written by	Featuring	Released
Part 1
1	"Future Pain"	Scott Handcock	James Goss	Jack, Yvonne, Gwen, Rhys, Andy, Ng, Colchester, Tyler, Orr, Colin, Norton, Ro-Jedda, God	October 2018
2	"The Man Who Destroyed Torchwood"	Scott Handcock	Guy Adams	Jack, Yvonne, Gwen, Rhys, Andy, Ng, Colchester, Tyler, Orr, Colin, Norton, Ro-Jedda, God	October 2018
3	"See No Evil"	Scott Handcock	John Dorney	Jack, Yvonne, Gwen, Rhys, Andy, Ng, Colchester, Tyler, Orr, Colin, Norton, Ro-Jedda, God	October 2018
4	"Night Watch"	Scott Handcock	Tim Foley	Jack, Yvonne, Gwen, Rhys, Andy, Ng, Colchester, Tyler, Orr, Colin, Norton, Ro-Jedda, God	October 2018
Part 2
5	"Flight 405"	Scott Handcock	Lou Morgan	Jack, Yvonne, Andy, Ng, Colchester, Tyler, Norton, Colin, God, the Committee	February 2019
6	"Hostile Environment"	Scott Handcock	Ash Darby	Jack, Yvonne, Andy, Ng, Colchester, Tyler, Norton, Colin, God, the Committee	February 2019
7	"Another Man's Shoes"	Scott Handcock	Tim Foley	Jack, Yvonne, Andy, Ng, Colchester, Tyler, Norton, Colin, God, the Committee	February 2019
8	"Eye of the Storm"	Scott Handcock	David Llewellyn	Jack, Yvonne, Andy, Ng, Colchester, Tyler, Norton, Colin, God, the Committee	February 2019
Part 3
9	"A Mother's Son"	Scott Handcock	Alexandria Riley	Jack, Yvonne, Andy, Ng, Colchester, Tyler, Orr, Colin, God, the Committee	June 2019
10	"ScrapeJane"	Scott Handcock	Robin Bell	Jack, Yvonne, Andy, Ng, Colchester, Tyler, Orr, Colin, God, the Committee	June 2019
11	"Day Zero"	Scott Handcock	Tim Foley	Jack, Yvonne, Andy, Ng, Colchester, Tyler, Orr, Colin, God, the Committee	June 2019
12	"Thoughts and Prayers"	Scott Handcock	James Goss	Jack, Yvonne, Andy, Ng, Colchester, Tyler, Orr, Colin, God, the Committee	June 2019

==== Among Us (2023) ====
No.	Title	Directed by	Written by	Featuring	Released
Part 1
1	"Aliens Next Door"	Scott Handcock	Ash Darby	Ng, Orr	May 2023
2	"Colin Alone"	Scott Handcock	Una McCormack	Colchester, Colin	May 2023
3	"Misty Eyes"	Scott Handcock	Tim Foley	Gwen, Rhys, Ng	May 2023
4	"Moderation"	Scott Handcock	James Goss	Colchester, Tyler	May 2023
Part 2
5	"Propaganda"	Scott Handcock	Ash Darby	Orr	June 2023
6	"At Her Majesty’s Pleasure"	Scott Handcock	Tim Foley	Yvonne, Andy, Tyler	June 2023
7	"Cuckoo"	Scott Handcock	Tim Foley	Bilis Manger, Ianto	June 2023
8	"Pariahs"	Scott Handcock	James Goss	Yvonne, Orr, Colchester, Ng, Tyler	June 2023
Part 3
9	"How I Conquered the World"	David O'Mahony	Tim Foley, Ash Darby & James Goss	Yvonne, Colchester, Orr, Ng, Tyler	July 2023
10	"Doomscroll"	David O'Mahony	Ash Darby	Orr, Colchester, Ng, Tyler	July 2023
11	"Heistland"	David O'Mahony	Tim Foley	Yvonne, Orr, Ng, Tyler, Rhys	July 2023
12	"The Apocalypse Starts at 6pm"	David O'Mahony	James Goss	Yvonne, Colchester, Orr, Ng, Tyler, Rhys	July 2023

=== Torchwood Soho (2020–2024) ===
==== Series 1: Parasite (2020) ====
No.	Title	Directed by	Written by	Featuring	Released
1	"The Man from Room 13"	Scott Handcock	James Goss	Norton, Andy, Lizbeth, Lyme	August 2020
2	"Meet Mr. Lyme"	Scott Handcock	James Goss	Norton, Andy, Lizbeth, Lyme	August 2020
3	"The Mould"	Scott Handcock	James Goss	Norton, Andy, Lizbeth, Lyme	August 2020
4	"The Spread"	Scott Handcock	James Goss	Norton, Andy, Lizbeth, Lyme	August 2020
5	"The Dead Hand"	Scott Handcock	James Goss	Norton, Andy, Lizbeth, Lyme	August 2020
6	"The Liberty of Norton Folgate"	Scott Handcock	James Goss	Norton, Andy, Lizbeth, Lyme	August 2020

==== Series 2: Ashenden (2021) ====
No.	Title	Directed by	Written by	Featuring	Released
1	"Pimlico"	Scott Handcock	James Goss	Norton, Andy, Lizbeth, Lyme	October 2021
2	"O Little Town of Ashenden"	Scott Handcock	James Goss	Norton, Andy, Lizbeth, Lyme	October 2021
3	"The National Health"	Scott Handcock	James Goss	Norton, Andy, Lizbeth, Lyme	October 2021
4	"Rivers of Blood"	Scott Handcock	James Goss	Norton, Andy, Lizbeth, Lyme	October 2021
5	"Now is the Time for All Good Men"	Scott Handcock	James Goss	Norton, Andy, Lizbeth, Lyme	October 2021
6	"The Hour of the Hollow Man"	Scott Handcock	James Goss	Norton, Andy, Lizbeth, Lyme	October 2021

==== Series 3: The Unbegotten (2022) ====
No.	Title	Directed by	Written by	Featuring	Released
1	"A First Breath"	Scott Handcock	James Goss	Norton, Andy, Lizbeth, Lyme	October 2022
2	"The Ghost Wall"	Scott Handcock	James Goss	Norton, Andy, Lizbeth, Lyme	October 2022
3	"The Taken"	Scott Handcock	James Goss	Norton, Andy, Lizbeth, Lyme	October 2022
4	"Afterwards They Came"	Scott Handcock	James Goss	Norton, Andy, Lizbeth, Lyme	October 2022
5	"Confessions"	Scott Handcock	James Goss	Norton, Andy, Lizbeth, Lyme	October 2022
6	"Mandeville Walks"	Scott Handcock	James Goss	Norton, Andy, Lizbeth, Lyme	October 2022

==== Series 4: Ascension (2024) ====
No.	Title	Directed by	Written by	Featuring	Released
1	"Burning Bright"	David O'Mahony	James Goss	Norton, Andy, Lizbeth, Lyme, Armitage	July 2024
2	"Chariot of Fire"	David O'Mahony	James Goss	Norton, Andy, Lizbeth, Lyme, Armitage	July 2024
3	"The Invisible Worm"	David O'Mahony	James Goss	Norton, Andy, Lizbeth, Lyme, Armitage	July 2024
4	"We Have Built Jerusalem"	David O'Mahony	James Goss	Norton, Andy, Lizbeth, Lyme, Armitage	July 2024
5	"Dark Satanic Mills"	David O'Mahony	James Goss	Norton, Andy, Lizbeth, Lyme, Armitage	July 2024
6	"Fearful Symmetry"	David O'Mahony	James Goss	Norton, Andy, Lizbeth, Lyme, Armitage	July 2024

== Awards and nominations ==
Name of the award ceremony, year presented, category, nominee(s) of the award, and the result of the nomination
Award ceremony	Year	Category	Work(s)	Result	Ref.
BBC Audio Drama Awards	2017	Best Online Only Audio Drama	"More Than This"	Nominated	
Scribe Awards	2017	Best Audio	"Broken"	Nominated	
Scribe Awards	2017	Best Audio	"Uncanny Valley"	Nominated	
Scribe Awards	2018	Best Audio	"torchwood_cascade_CDrip.tor"	Nominated	
Scribe Awards	2018	Best Audio	"The Dying Room"	Nominated	
Scribe Awards	2020	Best Audio	"Sargasso"	Nominated	
Scribe Awards	2021	Best Audio	"Tropical Beach Sounds and Other Relaxing Seascapes #4"	Won	
Scribe Awards	2021	Best Audio	"Save Our Souls"	Nominated	
