= Fall to Earth =

- Torchwood audioplay

Cast
- Starring: Gareth David-Lloyd – Ianto Jones
- Others: Lisa Zahra – Zeynep

Production
- Directed by: Scott Handcock
- Written by: James Goss
- Script editor: Steve Tribe
- Produced by: James Goss
- Executive producers: Jason Haigh-Ellery; Nicholas Briggs
- Production code: BFPTWCD02
- Series: Torchwood (Big Finish)
- Running time: 60 mins
- First broadcast: 19 October 2015

Chronology
| ← Preceded by "The Conspiracy" | Followed by → "Forgotten Lives" |

"Fall to Earth" is the second play in the main series of Torchwood audio plays produced by Big Finish Productions. It was written by James Goss and is a spin-off from the British science fiction television series Torchwood, itself a spin-off from Doctor Who.

It was released 19 October 2015 and stars Gareth David-Lloyd reprising his role of Ianto Jones for the first time since the 2011 BBC audio drama series, Torchwood: The Lost Files. It was made available to purchase on CD and as a download.

== Plot ==
High in the sky, Ianto Jones finds himself marooned on the maiden voyage of the first commercial space flight, the SkyPuncher but it's falling from the sky. Separated from his team at Torchwood Three, his only means of contact now is a young call centre operative called Zeynep...

== Continuity ==
- It is mentioned that Torchwood is investigating The Committee and that Captain Jack Harkness has gone missing, the arc begun in the previous Torchwood audio "The Conspiracy".
- Ianto recalls that Jack and Gwen killed his girlfriend Lisa Hallett after she was "horribly wounded in the line of duty". A reference to the first series television episode "Cyberwoman".
