= The Conspiracy (Torchwood) =

- Torchwood audioplay

Cast
- Starring: John Barrowman – Captain Jack Harkness
- Others: John Sessions – George Wilson; Sarah Ovens – Kate Wilson; Dan Bottomley – Sam Hallett; Guy Adams – Presenter

Production
- Directed by: Scott Handcock
- Written by: David Llewellyn
- Script editor: Steve Tribe
- Produced by: James Goss
- Executive producers: Jason Haigh-Ellery; Nicholas Briggs
- Production code: BFPTWCD01
- Series: Torchwood (Big Finish)
- Running time: 60 mins
- First broadcast: 15 September 2015

Chronology
← Preceded by —	Followed by → "Fall to Earth"

"The Conspiracy" is the first play in the main series of Torchwood audio plays produced by Big Finish Productions. It was written by David Llewellyn and is a spin-off from the British science fiction television series Torchwood, itself a spin-off from Doctor Who.

It was released 15 September 2015 and stars John Barrowman reprising his role of Captain Jack Harkness and made available to purchase on CD and as a download.

== Plot ==
George Wilson is a man who claims that the world is really under alien control and those who knew the truth have long since been silenced. Unfortunately for George no-one believes him. Captain Jack Harkness of Torchwood Three, however, knows George is right. The committee are here...

== Writing ==
In May 2015, Big Finish announced that they had been granted permission to produce audiobooks based on Torchwood as part of a licensing agreement between themselves and BBC Worldwide, allowing them to use characters and concepts from the revived series of Doctor Who (2005–present) and its spin-offs in future productions. The company was formerly only permitted to use concepts from the series' original 1963–89 run and its self-titled 1996 TV film. The new Torchwood plays also received the blessing of Torchwood creator Russell T Davies, who had been working with Gardner and former Big Finish producer Gary Russell to bring the show to the company since 2013.
