= La sonnambula (disambiguation) =

La sonnambula is an 1831 opera by Vincenzo Bellini with an Italian libretto by Felice Romani, based on a scenario by Eugène Scribe.

La sonnambula may also refer to:

- La somnambule, ou L'arrivée d'un nouveau seigneur, an 1827 ballet-pantomime composed by Ferdinand Hérold and choreographed by Jean-Pierre Aumer, based on Scribe's scenario
- La sonnambula (Balanchine), a 1965 ballet, also based on Scribe's scenario, choreographed by George Balanchine and set to music by Vittorio Rieti

== See also ==
- Sonámbulo (disambiguation)
- Somnambulist (disambiguation)
