= Look to the Skies =

Studio album by Sicmonic
- Released: August 2006
- Studios: Villain Recording, Phoenix, AZ
- Genres: Progressive metal Experimental metal
- Length: 49:42
- Label: Independent

Sicmonic chronology
Look to the Skies (2006)	Somnambulist (2008)

Singles from Look to the Skies
- 1. "Fist To Throat"

Look to the Skies is the debut album by American heavy metal band Sicmonic. It was independently released in August 2006 and only 2000 copies of the album were pressed and released. The album's first single, "Fist to Throat" featured a Fallen Films released music video and was shot behind their rehearsal studio in Phoenix, Arizona. The video was directed and edited by Freddy Allen. Look to the Skies is the first and last release that drummer Douglas Berry performed on.

The album features a cover of the Charlie Daniels Band song "The Devil Went Down to Georgia".

== Track listing ==
All songs by Sicmonic, except "Devil Went Down to Georgia" by Charlie Daniels Band.

No.	Title	Writer(s)	Length
1.	"Fist To Throat"	Hession; Goodwin; Warren; Williams; Berry	3:37
2.	"Seven Inches Deep"	Hession; Goodwin; Warren; Williams; Berry	4:31
3.	"My Own Reflection"	Hession; Goodwin; Warren; Williams; Berry	2:36
4.	"Blood Shot"	Hession; Goodwin; Warren; Williams; Berry	3:52
5.	"Silent Screams"	Hession; Goodwin; Warren; Williams; Berry	3:31
6.	"Hypnotic"	Hession; Goodwin; Warren; Williams; Berry	5:05
7.	"Shadow Bound"	Hession; Goodwin; Warren; Williams; Berry	5:03
8.	"Forever and a Day"	Hession; Goodwin; Warren; Williams; Berry	3:56
9.	"Dementia"	Hession; Goodwin; Warren; Williams; Berry	3:53
10.	"Desensitized"	Hession; Goodwin; Warren; Williams; Berry	3:46
11.	"Cracks in the Pavement"	Hession; Goodwin; Warren; Williams; Berry	2:40
12.	"Black Hole Rebirth"	Hession; Goodwin; Warren; Williams; Berry	3:51
13.	"Devil Went Down to Georgia [Hidden Tracks: "Paradisym", "Requiem"]"	Daniels; DiGregorio, Crain; Edwards; Hayward; Marshall	15:39
Total length:			49:42

== Personnel ==
Sicmonic

- Taylor Hession – vocals
- Ray Goodwin – lead guitar, violin
- Robert "Bob" Warren – rhythm guitar
- Jason Williams – bass
- Douglas Berry – drums, percussion

Production

- Sicmonic – producers, mixing
- Byron Filson – producer, recording, mastering, mixing
- Aaron Layman – engineer
- Ray Goodwin – additional lyrics on "Paradisym" and "Requiem"
