= Sonámbulo (disambiguation) =

Sonámbulo (or Sonambulo) is a word in the Spanish language meaning sleepwalker.

sonámbulo may refer to:

- Sonámbulo, an independent comic-book by Rafael Navarro which combines elements of lucha libre and noir
  - Sonámbulo, the protagonist of the series
- "Sonámbulo", a song by Fernando Villalona
- "Sonámbulo", a song by Tito Nieves
- Sonámbulo, also known as The Sleepwalker, a 2015 Spanish animated short film

== See also ==
- La sonnambula (disambiguation)
- Somnambulist (disambiguation)
