= Sicmonic =

American heavy metal band

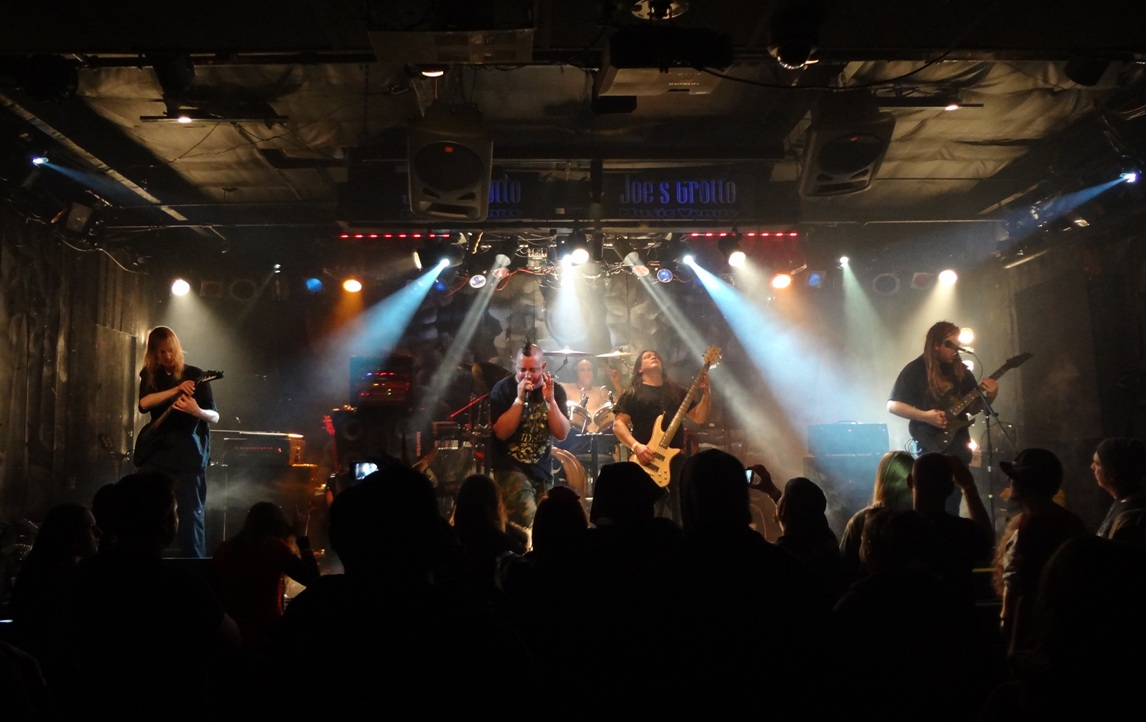
- Sicmonic performing live in Phoenix, Arizona

Background information
- Origin: Phoenix, Arizona, USA
- Genres: Experimental metal, progressive metal, nu metal
- Years active: 2005–present
- Label: Aural Music
- Members: Ray Goodwin; Zach Kasmer; David Digilio; Zack Sewell
- Past members: Billy Zane Muna; Taylor Hession; Jason Williams; Douglas Berry; Robert "Bob" Warren; Josh Ward; Ryan Gero
- Website: www.sicmonic.com

Sicmonic (stylized as (Sic)monic) is an American heavy metal band from Phoenix, Arizona, consisting of Billy Zane Muna, Ray Goodwin, Zach Kasmer, David Digilio and Zack Sewell. The band has released 2 LPs to date with a third in the process of recording. Their music is often classified as modern, progressive and experimental metal. Sicmonic is currently signed to Aural Music and Warner/Chappell publishing. Lead guitarist, Ray Goodwin is endorsed by Jackson Guitars.

== Formation ==
Sicmonic was formed in March 2005 when the guitarists Ray Goodwin, Robert Warren and Jason Williams of The Awakening, merged with vocalist Taylor Hession of Bedlam 23 and drummer Douglas Berry. Sicmonic quickly became an icon in the southwest music scene and in 2006, they released their debut album titled, Look to the Skies. Sicmonic peaked at No. 6 on the Sign Me to Roadrunner Records "All Time Metal" chart.

=== Look to the Skies ===
The band's debut album, Look to the Skies, was released on August 11, 2006. The album's first single, "Fist to Throat" featured a Fallen Films released music video and was shot behind their rehearsal studio in Phoenix, Arizona. The video was directed and edited by Freddy Allen. The album features a cover of the Charlie Daniels Band's "The Devil Went Down to Georgia". Soon, Look to the Skies caught the interest of Italian label Aural Music, and brought forth the second album, Somnambulist. Before the writing of Somnambulist, Douglas Berry left the band.

=== Somnambulist ===
On July 30, 2008, Sicmonic independently released a sampler containing four tracks to be released on the second studio album, Somnambulist. On September 9, 2008, Sicmonic released an independently recorded version of Somnambulist and features long time friend and original The Awakening drummer, Zack Sewell. Only 1000 independent copies were pressed and released before engaging in an exclusive contest with Aural Music. A signed version was released on December 25, 2009. It contained alternative artwork and four bonus tracks that were previously released on Look to the Skies. Somnambulist berthed 2 singles, "Oxygen" and "Somnambulist". After recording the album, guitarist Robert "Bob" Warren parted ways with the band and Josh Ward stepped in to fill rhythm guitar duties.

=== Death of Billy Zane Muna ===
On February 5, 2024, lead vocalist Billy Zane Muna passed away. He aged 42.

== Discography ==
Sicmonic discography
- Studio albums: 2
- Compilation albums: 1
- Singles: 8
- Music videos: 8

=== Studio albums ===
Year	Album	Label
2006	Look to the Skies	Released: August 11, 2006; Label: Independent
2008	Somnambulist	Released: September 9, 2008; Label: Independent; Re-released: December 25, 2009; Label: Aural Music
2016	Darcauditure	Released: TBD; Label: Aural Music

== Singles ==
- "Fist to Throat"
- "Oxygen"
- "Somnambulist"

== Music videos ==
- "Fist to Throat"
- "Somnambulist"
- "Feed My Psychosis"

== Band members ==
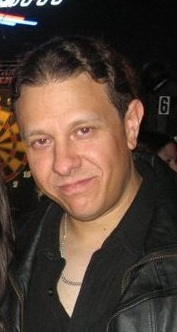
David Digilio

Current members

- Ray Goodwin – Lead Guitar, Violin
- Zach Kasmer – Rhythm Guitar
- David Digilio – Bass
- Zack Sewell – Drums, Percussion

Former members

- Douglas Berry – Drums, Percussion
- Robert "Bob" Warren – Rhythm Guitar
- Josh Ward – Rhythm Guitar
- Ryan Gero – Rhythm Guitar
- Taylor Hession – Vocals
- Jason Williams – Bass
- Billy Zane Muna – Vocals
