= Somnambulist (album) =

Studio album by Sicmonic
- Released: September 9, 2008; December 25, 2009 (Re-Issue)
- Recorded: January 2007 – March 2008
- Studio: Villain Recording and Highland Recorders, Phoenix, AZ
- Genre: Progressive metal Experimental metal
- Length: 69:22 (Independent); 74:41 (Re-issue)
- Label: Aural Music

Sicmonic chronology
Look to the Skies (2006)	Somnambulist (2008)	Darcauditure (2012)

Signed re-issue cover

Singles from Somnambulist
- 1. "Oxygen"; 2. "Somnambulist"

Somnambulist is the second album by experimental, progressive metal band Sicmonic, independently released on September 9, 2008. A signed version was released on December 25, 2009 by Aural Music and it contained four bonus tracks. A music video for "Somnambulist" has been released. After recording the album, guitarist Robert "Bob" Warren parted ways with the band and Josh Ward stepped in to fill rhythm guitar duties.

== Promotion ==
On July 30, 2008 a four song sampler was released. It contained the tracks, Acidic Epiphanies, Somnambulist, No Conscience, Just How Far Down Do You Want To Go?.

== Track listing ==
No.	Title	Length
1.	"To The Fiendz..."	5:19
2.	"Till The Morning Light"	7:11
3.	"Somnambulist"	3:14
4.	"Illumination"	7:32
5.	"Of Blood and Grace"	6:30
6.	"Requiem"	4:14
7.	"Oxygen"	4:21
8.	"No Conscience"	4:59
9.	"Just How Far Down Do You Want To Go?"	5:25
10.	"Paradiseum"	4:39
11.	"Acidic Epiphanies^{1} [Hidden Tracks: "All Things Considered", "Manic Depression (The Unknown)"]"	11:26

Signed Re-issue Bonus Tracks
No.	Title	Length
12.	"Fist To Throat"	3:38
13.	"Seven Inches Deep"	3:31
14.	"Hypnotic"	5:05
15.	"Devil Went Down To Georgia"	3:33

^{1} Acidic Epiphanies on the re-issue does not contain hidden tracks and has a run time of 4:35.

== Personnel ==
- Taylor Hession – Vocals
- Ray Goodwin – Lead Guitar, Violin
- Robert "Bob" Warren – Rhythm Guitar
- Jason Williams – Bass
- Zack Sewell – Drums, Percussion
- Sean Carr of Lurid State – additional vocals (track 1)

Production

- Jim Woodling engineer
- Byron Filson – engineer, mixing, mastering
