= The Somnambulist =

2007 novel by Jonathan Barnes

- The Somnambulist cover
- Author: Jonathan Barnes
- Language: English
- Genre: Fantasy novel / horror
- Publisher: Gollancz (Hardcover edition)
- Publication date: 2007
- Publication place: United States
- Media type: Print (hardback)
- Pages: 353 pp (Hardcover edition)
- ISBN: 978-0-06-137538-5 (Hardcover edition)
- OCLC: 191823179
- Dewey Decimal: 823/.92 22
- LC Class: PR6102.A768 S66 2007

The Somnambulist is a 2007 fantasy/horror novel set in the late Victorian period, and is the debut novel by Jonathan Barnes. The protagonists Edward Moon, a conjurer and detective, and his silent partner The Somnambulist, a milk-drinking giant who does not bleed when stabbed, are called to investigate a murder that may tie to the poetry and prophecies of Samuel Taylor Coleridge and the fate of London.
