= Jack Harkness =

Fictional character from Doctor Who and Torchwood

Captain Jack Harkness
- Doctor Who character
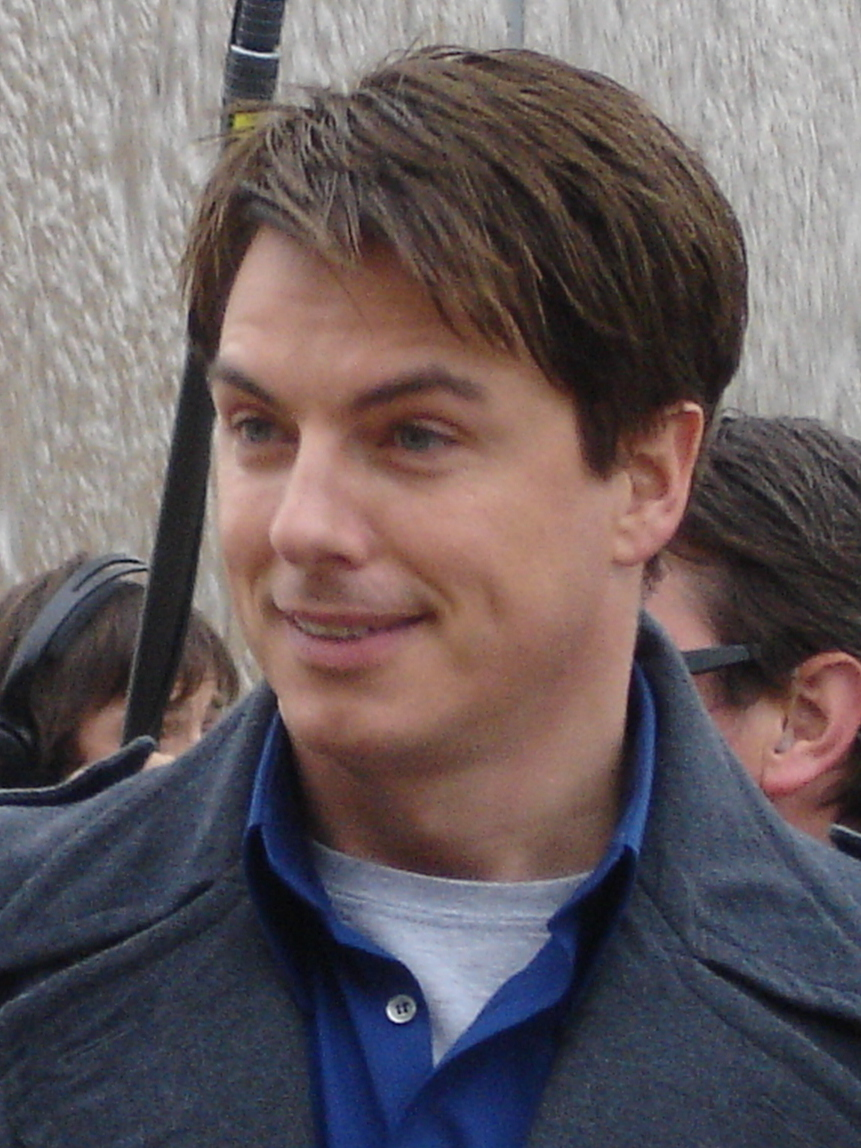
- John Barrowman as Jack Harkness
- First appearance: "The Empty Child" (2005)
- Created by: Russell T Davies (character), Steven Moffat (first appearance)
- Portrayed by: John Barrowman
- Shared universe appearances: Torchwood (2006–2011)
- Duration: 2005–2011, 2020–2021

In-universe information
- Aliases: Javic Piotr Thane (birth name); Dr. Owen Harper; The Face of Boe; James Sangster; James Harper; Captain Jack Harkness
- Affiliation: Time Agency; Ninth Doctor; Tenth Doctor; Thirteenth Doctor; Torchwood Institute
- Family: Franklin (father); Gray (brother); Unnamed mother
- Children: Alice Carter (daughter); Junior (son); Sladen (daughter)
- Relatives: Steven Carter (grandson)
- Home era: 51st century 5094 (original); 21st century (current)

Captain Jack Harkness is a fictional character played by John Barrowman in Doctor Who and its spin-off series, Torchwood. The character first appears in the 2005 Doctor Who episode "The Empty Child" and subsequently features in the remaining episodes of the first series (2005) as a companion to the series' protagonist, the Doctor. Subsequent to this, Jack became the central character in the adult-themed Torchwood, which aired from 2006 to 2011. Barrowman reprised the role for appearances in Doctor Who in its third, fourth, and twelfth series, as well as specials "The End of Time", and "Revolution of the Daleks".

In contrast to The Doctor, Jack is more of a conventional action hero, as well as outwardly flirtatious and capable of acts which The Doctor would view as less than noble. In the programme's narrative, Jack begins as a time traveller and con man from the 51st century, who comes to travel with the Ninth Doctor (Christopher Eccleston) and his companion Rose Tyler (Billie Piper). As a consequence of his death and resurrection in the Series 1 finale, "The Parting of the Ways", Jack becomes immortal and is stranded on 19th-century Earth. There he becomes a member of Torchwood, an organization dedicated to combating alien threats. He spends over a century waiting to reunite with the Doctor, over which time he becomes the leader of the Torchwood branch in Cardiff. He later reunites with the Tenth Doctor (David Tennant) and Thirteenth Doctor (Jodie Whittaker) for further stints on Doctor Who. Aspects of the character's backstory—both prior to meeting the Doctor, and during his many decades living on Earth—are gradually revealed over Torchwood (and to a lesser extent, Doctor Who) through the use of flashback scenes and expository dialogue.

Jack was the first openly non-heterosexual character in the history of televised Doctor Who. The popularity of the character amongst multiple audiences directly influenced the development of the spin-off series Torchwood. The character became a figure of the British public consciousness, rapidly gaining fame for actor Barrowman. As an ongoing depiction of bisexuality in mainstream British television, the character became a role model for young gay and bisexual people in the UK. Jack is featured in various Doctor Who and Torchwood books and has action figures created in his likeness.

== Appearances ==
=== Television ===
Jack Harkness first appeared in the 2005 Doctor Who two-part story, "The Empty Child" and "The Doctor Dances", when Rose Tyler (Billie Piper), a companion of the Ninth Doctor (Christopher Eccleston), meets him during the London Blitz. Although posing as an American volunteering in the Royal Air Force, Jack is actually a former "Time Agent" from the 51st century who left the agency after inexplicably losing two years of his memory. Now working as a con man, Jack is responsible for unwittingly releasing a plague in London in 1941. After the Doctor cures the plague, Jack redeems himself by taking an unexploded bomb into his ship; the Doctor and Rose rescue him moments before it explodes. He subsequently travels with the Doctor and Rose in the Doctor's time-travelling spacecraft, the TARDIS. During his time with the Doctor, Jack matures into a hero, and in his final 2005 appearance, he sacrifices himself fighting the evil alien Daleks. Rose brings him back to life while suffused with the power of the time vortex, but when the power leaves her she doesn't remember doing it. She and the Doctor subsequently leave Jack behind on Satellite 5.

Jack returned in 2006 as a character of the spin-off series Torchwood, in which he is a member of the Cardiff-based Torchwood Three in combating alien threats and monitoring a spacetime rift which runs through Cardiff. Jack is re-introduced as a changed man, reluctantly immortal, having spent years on Earth waiting to reunite with the Doctor. Jack recruits policewoman Gwen Cooper (Eve Myles) to the team of experts after she discovers them; there are hints of romantic feelings between the two, but Gwen has a boyfriend and Jack enters a sexual relationship with the team's general factotum Ianto Jones (Gareth David-Lloyd). Despite having worked with him for some time, his present-day colleagues know very little about him; over the course of the series they discover that he cannot die. Jack was once a prisoner of war, and was an interrogator who used torture. In the Torchwood Series 1 finale "End of Days", Jack returns to the TARDIS. This immediately leads into the 2007 Doctor Who episode "Utopia", where he joins the Tenth Doctor (David Tennant) and his companion Martha Jones (Freema Agyeman). Jack explains he returned from Satellite 5 to the present day by travelling to 1869 via vortex manipulator, and lived through the 20th century waiting for the Doctor. By the series finale, having spent a year in an alternative timeline enslaved by The Master (John Simm), Jack opts to return to his team in Cardiff. Before departing, Jack speculates about his immortality and reminisces about his youth on the Boeshane Peninsula, revealing that his nickname had been the "Face of Boe", suggesting that he may one day become the non-humanoid recurring character of the same name, voiced by Struan Rodger.

In Torchwood's second series (2008), Jack returns with a lighter attitude, and finds his team have continued working in his absence. They are also more insistent to learn of his past, especially after meeting his former partner, the unscrupulous Captain John Hart (James Marsters). The episode "Adam" explores Jack's childhood in the Boeshane Peninsula, revealing through flashback sequences how his father Franklin (Demetri Goritsas) died and young Jack (Jack Montgomery) lost his younger brother Gray (Ethan Brooke) during an alien invasion. Flashbacks in the series' penultimate episode "Fragments" depict Jack's capture by Torchwood in the late 19th century. Initially their prisoner, Jack is coerced into becoming a freelance agent for the organization, and eventually becomes leader of Torchwood Three at midnight on 1 January 2000. The series finale features the return of Captain John and Jack's brother Gray (Lachlan Nieboer), who, after a lifetime of torture by aliens, wants revenge on Jack. While Jack manages to repair his friendship with Captain John to some degree, he is forced to place his brother in cryogenic stasis after Gray kills his teammates Toshiko Sato (Naoko Mori) and Owen Harper (Burn Gorman). Jack subsequently appears alongside the casts of Torchwood and The Sarah Jane Adventures in the two-part crossover finale of the 2008 Doctor Who series, "The Stolen Earth" and "Journey's End". Jack is summoned along with other former companions of the Doctor to assist him in defeating the mad scientist Davros (Julian Bleach) and his creation, the Daleks. Jack parts company from the Doctor once again, having helped save the universe from destruction.

Torchwood's third series (2009) is a five-part serial entitled Children of Earth. Aliens known as the 4-5-6 announce they are coming to Earth. Civil servant John Frobisher (Peter Capaldi) orders the destruction of Torchwood to cover a conspiracy; in 1965, the British government had authorized Jack to sacrifice twelve children to the 4-5-6, which is shown in flashbacks. Jack is blown apart in an explosion, but painfully reconstitutes from an incomplete pile of body parts; Gwen and Ianto escape and later rescue Jack from a concrete grave. Jack's daughter Alice (Lucy Cohu) and grandson Steven (Bear McCausland) are taken into custody by the assassins. The 4-5-6 demand ten percent of the world's children. Although he handed over twelve children in 1965, Jack refuses to give up any this time around. The 4-5-6 release a fatal virus; Ianto dies in Jack's arms. To create the signal that will destroy the 4-5-6, Jack is forced to sacrifice Steven. As a result of this, he and Alice sever ties with each other. Six months later, having lost his lover, his grandson and his daughter, he bids farewell to Gwen and is transported aboard an alien ship to leave Earth for parts unknown. In the closing scenes of 2010 Doctor Who special "The End of Time", the critically injured Doctor gives each companion a farewell before his impending regeneration. Finding Jack in an exotic alien bar, he leaves him a note containing the name of Titanic crew member Alonso Frame (Russell Tovey), sitting on Jack's left side; the two proceed to flirt.

The fourth series, Miracle Day (2011), an American co-production, sees Jack return to Earth to investigate a phenomenon where humans can no longer die; Jack discovers that he has become mortal. Investigating their connection to the so-called "miracle", CIA agent Rex Matheson (Mekhi Phifer) renditions Jack and Gwen to America, but joins the team along with CIA colleague Esther Drummond (Alexa Havins) after conspirators within the CIA betray them. Jack's investigations into the miracle repeatedly turn up dead-ends, indicating a decades-old conspiracy to manipulate the global economy, as well as political institutions, for unknown purposes. Flashbacks in "Immortal Sins" depict Jack's relationship with Italian thief Angelo Colasanto (Daniele Favilli) in late 1920s New York City, ending in heartbreak after Jack is killed, bled and tortured repeatedly by the local community. In the present day, Angelo's granddaughter Olivia (Nana Visitor) explains that the descendants of three local businessmen who wished to purchase Jack's powers—"the Three Families"—are responsible for the miracle, using Jack's blood in conjunction with what they call "the Blessing". In "The Gathering", the team ultimately track down the Families and the Blessing, which is revealed to be an antipodal geological formation connected to the Earth's morphic field running from Shanghai and Buenos Aires; the team divide, attempting to reach both access points. To end the miracle, in "The Blood Line", Jack has Gwen kill him so that his mortal blood can reset the human morphic field; Gwen kills him with a bullet through the chest, while Rex—who transfused himself with Jack's blood to keep it safe—allows the Blessing to drain him too, in Buenos Aires. Rex survives, and with the morphic field restored, Jack resurrects. At Esther's funeral however, they discover that Rex has acquired self-healing abilities just like Jack's.

After a ten-year absence from the show, Jack returned in the twelfth series of Doctor Who in the episode "Fugitive of the Judoon" (2020), where he attempts to contact the Doctor (Jodie Whittaker). Using a stolen alien craft, he transports the Doctor's companions Graham O'Brien (Bradley Walsh), Ryan Sinclair (Tosin Cole) and Yaz Khan (Mandip Gill), mistaking each of them for the Doctor. Learning of their identity and the Doctor's recent regeneration into a woman, he returns them to Earth, passing them a warning to give to the Doctor about the "lone Cyberman", before he teleports away after the ship's onboard nanogenes attack him. He returned in the 2021 New Year's episode "Revolution of the Daleks", in which he breaks the Doctor out of a Judoon prison, recovering his vortex manipulator in the process. Later, alongside the Doctor's companions, they repel a new Dalek invasion of Earth. Jack then chooses to stay on Earth and reconnect with Gwen Cooper.

In May 2021, following reports of the actor's alleged misconduct, a video featuring Barrowman as Harkness was removed from the stage show Doctor Who: Time Fracture, Big Finish removed the Torchwood release "Absent Friends" from pre-order and their release schedule, and Titan Comics shelved a graphic novel due to feature Harkness.

=== Literature ===
Jack features in the BBC Books "New Series Adventures" Doctor Who novels The Deviant Strain, The Stealers of Dreams, and Only Human. These novels take place between episodes of the 2005 series of Doctor Who. In The Stealers of Dreams, Jack refers to the Face of Boe as a famous figure in his home era; the producers of the series had not conceptualized the possibility of a Jack and Boe connection until mid-way into the production of the 2007 series.

The first wave of BBC Books Torchwood novels, Another Life, Border Princes, and Slow Decay (published January 2007), are set between episodes of the first series of Torchwood. The novels Trace Memory, The Twilight Streets, and Something in the Water (published March 2008), are set during the concurrently airing second series of Torchwood. The Twilight Streets suggests Jack was a freelance Torchwood agent in the 1940s, who disagreed with their methods but was persuaded by the love of an ex-boyfriend, Greg. The novel also explained that during the events of the Doctor Who episode "Boom Town" (which was set in Cardiff), Jack placed a lockdown on Torchwood activity so as not to create a paradox involving his past self. Trace Memory similarly depicts Jack as a freelance Torchwood agent, living and working in the late 1960s. Pack Animals, SkyPoint, and Almost Perfect (October 2008), are made up of more second series adventures, apart from Almost Perfect which is set after Series Two finale "Exit Wounds". Into the Silence, Bay of the Dead, and The House that Jack Built (May 2009), similarly are set between the second and third series of the show. The House that Jack Built focuses partly on Jack's life in 1906. Risk Assessment, The Undertaker's Gift, and Consequences (October 2009), are likewise set between "Exit Wounds" and Children of Earth.

Jack as he appears in the first Torchwood comic book, art by SL Gallant; the character is featured in a number of different media.

First published in January 2008, the monthly Torchwood Magazine began occasionally including Torchwood comic strips, in which Jack also appears. One such comic, written in 2009 by John Barrowman and sister Carole E. Barrowman, "Captain Jack and the Selkie", expands on Captain Jack's characterisation. Barrowman comments that "We'd already agreed to tell a story that showed a side of Jack and a part of his history that hadn't been explored too much in other media. I wanted to give fans something original about Jack." Torchwood Magazine also ran with the ten-part Rift War! storyline from April to December 2008. The first Torchwood comic "Jetsam" was later collected along with Rift War! in a graphic novel.

The Torchwood Archives, published after the second series in 2008, is a companion book written by Gary Russell which gives an "insider's look" into the life of Jack and the Torchwood team. The book collects and re-publishes ancillary material which appeared on the Torchwood website in the first two seasons, and provides new material such as rough dates for things like Jack's marriage as relayed by the book's fictional narrator. The book is composed of fictitious archive notes, personnel forms, photographs, newspaper clippings and staff memos, and offers revelations about the character which would later be confirmed by the television series. For example, Archives first mention Jack's lover Lucia Moretti, who is mentioned in Children of Earth. In a similar vein to The Torchwood Archives but from a real-world perspective, Gary Russell's The Torchwood Encyclopedia (2009) expands on "every fact and figure" for Jack and the Torchwood world.

The character is also mentioned Dave Stone's 2006 Judge Dredd novel Psykogeddon, where a Mega-City News announcer relays a disclaimer from pornographer Jason Kane – a character Stone created for the 1996 Doctor Who novel Death and Diplomacy – stating that any similarity between Kane and "the notorious Cursed Earth brigand 'Captain' Jack Harkness is a purely unfortunate coincidence".

Jack makes a brief appearance in the 2021 Doctor Who novel The Ruby's Curse by Alex Kingston.

=== Online media ===
During the first series of Torchwood, the Torchwood website, located at torchwood.org.uk, recounted some adventures by Captain Jack through an alternate reality game made up of electronic literature in the form of fictional intercepted blogs, newspaper cutouts and confidential letters and IM conversations between members of the Torchwood Three crew. Written by James Goss, the first series' website sheds some light on Jack's backstory in the years he worked for Torchwood. For the second series in 2008, a second interactive Torchwood online game was devised, scripted by series writer Phil Ford, and as with the 2006 website contained some information on Jack's unseen adventures. The BBC America Torchwood also has a 'Captain's Blog' section which relays Jack's accounts of the events of each episode. The Torchwood Archives by Gary Russell collects much of this online literature for the first two series in hardback form, including the Captain's Blog section of the BBC America website.

During Series Four of Doctor Who, the BBC's website also included a section called "Captain Jack's Monster Files" featuring weekly webcast videos narrated by John Barrowman in character as Captain Jack giving "top secret" facts collected by Torchwood about Doctor Who monsters, such as the Slitheen. A Christmas special 2008 Monster File features Barrowman in new footage as Jack, as does the Cybermen edition added following the airing of "The Next Doctor" on Christmas Day. For Dr Fiona Hobden, the Monster Files' mock-documentary format give an "additional twist" to the interplay between history and fiction. Because Captain Jack narrates, "the story unfolds in the tradition of contemporary historical documentary, the docudrama"; in the Monster File for "The Fires of Pompeii", Harkness' commentary moves the 'reality' of the episode away from the explosion of Vesuvius and the human experience, and to the story itself. From Series Five onwards, the Monster Files are instead presented by River Song (Alex Kingston).

Jack also appears in the web-based motion comic series Torchwood: Web of Lies (2011), which ties into Miracle Day. The story depicts a series two-set adventure where Jack is kidnapped by unknown assailants and pursued by Gwen. Investigations by a woman named Holly (voice of Eliza Dushku) establish that Jack was kidnapped by the Three Families so they could acquire entire vats of his blood, which she destroys.

=== Audio drama ===
In addition to the paperback novels, Jack also appears in Torchwood audio books, the first four being Hidden written by Steven Savile and narrated by Naoko Mori, Everyone Says Hello written by Dan Abnett and narrated by Burn Gorman, released February 2008, In the Shadows by Joseph Lidster and narrated by Eve Myles, released September 2008, and The Sin Eaters written by Brian Minchin and narrated by Gareth David-Lloyd, released September 2008. Joseph Lidster also wrote a BBC Radio 4 Torchwood drama, "Lost Souls" which aired in Summer 2008 as an Afternoon Play featuring the voices of John Barrowman, Eve Myles, Gareth David-Lloyd and Freema Agyeman. Set after the events of the 2008 series, Jack and his team make their first international adventure to CERN in Geneva, as part of Radio 4's special celebration of the Large Hadron Collider being switched on. The special radio episode's plot focuses on the Large Hadron Collider's activation and the doomsday scenario some predicted it might incite, as well as the team's mourning of Toshiko and Owen's recent deaths. Between 1 and 3 July, Radio 4 aired three further audio dramas in The Afternoon Play slot, bridging the gap between Series 2 and 3. "Golden Age" introduced Jack's ex-lover Duchess Eleanor (Jasmine Hyde), the leader of Torchwood India, which Jack closed down in 1924. "The Dead Line" features another ex-girlfriend of Jack's, Stella Courtney (Doña Croll).

2011 audio drama series The Lost Files was released to tie in with Miracle Day. "The Devil and Miss Carew" and "Submission" are set in the same period as the previous audio dramas. "House of the Dead", however, reveals itself in its final act to be set six months after Ianto's death; Jack visited the House of the Dead to make contact with Ianto, who is unaware that he is dead. Jack and Ianto say a final goodbye and tell each other they love one another for the first time. Jack attempts to return to the land of the living alongside Ianto, but Ianto stays behind to close the Cardiff spacetime rift forever with Jack's device.

In 2015, BBC Worldwide granted a licence for Big Finish Productions to produce Torchwood audio plays. Barrowman was the first Torchwood cast member to reprise his role and has appeared in numerous releases, including semi-regular appearances in the monthly range, an ongoing series set after the events of Miracle Day and various special releases. Captain Jack was set to appear in Absent Friends - marking the fiftieth Torchwood monthly range release - which would have seen him reunited with the Tenth Doctor (David Tennant). However, while this story was recorded, its release was cancelled in May 2021.

In 2017, Big Finish Productions released a solo audio series for the character - The Lives of Captain Jack - containing four plays depicting adventures in Jack's life. Including the year he spent on a devastated Earth following The Parting of the Ways; his romantic encounter with Alonso Frame, briefly alluded to in The End of Time; a friendship he developed with Jackie Tyler (Camille Coduri) during the time he waited on Earth for the Doctor to return; and a story from his days as a Time Agent before he adopted the name Jack Harkness, revealing how he lost two years of memory along with his real name: Javic Piotr Thane.

A second volume of The Lives of Captain Jack was released in 2019 which saw Jack filling in for a recuperating Sixth Doctor (Colin Baker) and working as a chauffeur for newsreader Trinity Wells (Lachele Carl). In 2020, following Jack's return to television in Fugitive of the Judoon but recorded prior to broadcast, a third volume reunited him with Jackie, depicted an ageing Jack in the distant future and explored his encounters - and romance - with River Song (Alex Kingston).

== Characterisation ==
=== Concept and creation ===
"I wanted kids to like him, and I wanted women, men, I wanted everyone to like him. But first I wanted people to hate him. I wanted them to think he was arrogant and pushy and too sure of himself. And I wanted them to follow the arc of the change he went through in the final episodes of Doctor Who."

— John Barrowman

In naming the character, executive producer and head writer Russell T Davies drew inspiration from the Marvel Comics character Agatha Harkness, a character whose surname Davies had previously used in naming lead characters in Century Falls and The Grand. Davies states that reusing names (such as Tyler, Smith, Harper, Harkness and Jones) allows him to get a grip of the character on the blank page. Jack's original appearances in Doctor Who were conceived with the intention of forming a character arc in which Jack is transformed from a coward to a hero, and John Barrowman consciously minded this in his portrayal of the character. Following on that arc, the character's debut episode would leave his morality as ambiguous, publicity materials asking, "Is he a force for good or ill?"

Actor John Barrowman himself was a key factor in the conception of Captain Jack. Barrowman says that at the time of his initial casting, Davies and co-executive producer, Julie Gardner had explained to him that they "basically wrote the character around [John]". Davies had singled out Barrowman for the part. On meeting him, Barrowman tried out the character using his native Scottish accent, his normal American accent, and an English accent; Davies decided it "made it bigger if it was an American accent". Barrowman recounts Davies as having been searching for an actor with a "matinée idol quality", telling him that "the only one in the whole of Britain who could do it was you". A number of television critics have compared Barrowman's performances as Captain Jack to those of Hollywood actor Tom Cruise.

The character's introduction served to posit him as a secondary hero and a rival to the series protagonist, the Doctor, simultaneously paralleling the Doctor's detached alien nature with Jack's humanity and "heart". John Barrowman describes the character in his initial appearance as "an intergalactic conman" and also a "rogue Time Agent" which he defines as "part of a kind of space CIA" and alludes to the moral ambiguity of having "done something in his past" and not knowing "whether it is good or bad because his memory has been erased". Writer Stephen James Walker notes similarities have been found between Jack and Angel (David Boreanaz), the heroic vampire from America's Buffy the Vampire Slayer and Angel; Alan Stanley Blair of SyFy Portal pointed out that "Back alley fights, knowledge of the paranormal and an unwanted task of defending the helpless are only a few of the correlations between the two characters." Jack has also been compared to the title character of America's Xena: Warrior Princess, which featured lesbian subtext between Xena (Lucy Lawless) and her close friend Gabrielle (Renee O'Connor). Polina Skibinskaya, writing for AfterElton.com, an American gay men's website, notes both are "complex characters" haunted by their past misdeeds. Furthermore, like Xena, Jack is "a gay basher's worst nightmare: a queer weapon-wielding, ass-kicking superhero gleefully chewing his way through awesome fight scenes". One academic article refers to Jack as "an indestructible Captain Scarlet figure". In a comparative contrast, where the Doctor is a pacifist, Jack is more inclined to see violent means to reach similar ends. The BBC News website refers to Jack's role within Doctor Who as "[continuing] what began with Ian Chesterton and continued later with Harry Sullivan". Whereas in the classic series the female "companions" were sometimes exploited and sexualised for the entertainment of predominantly male audiences, the producers could reverse this dynamic with Jack, citing an equal need amongst modern audiences to "look at good looking men". John Barrowman linked the larger number of women watching the show as a key factor in this.

Jack is bisexual, and is the first televised Doctor Who character to be openly anything other than heterosexual. In Jack's first appearance, the Doctor suggests that Jack's orientation is more common in the 51st century, when humankind will deal with multiple alien species and becomes more sexually flexible. Within Doctor Who's narrative, Jack's sexual orientation is not specifically labelled as that could "make it an issue". On creating Jack, Davies comments "I thought: 'It's time you introduce bisexuals properly into mainstream television,'" with a focus on making Jack fun and swashbuckling as opposed to negative and angsty. Davies also expresses that he didn't make the character bisexual "from any principle", but rather because "it would be interesting from a narrative point of view." The bisexuality-related labels "pansexual" and "omnisexual" are also frequently applied to the character. Writer Steven Moffat suggests that questions of sexual orientation do not even enter into Jack's mind; Moffat also comments "It felt right that the James Bond of the future would bed anyone." Within Torchwood, the character refers to sexual orientation classifications as "quaint". In an interview with the Chicago Tribune, John Barrowman explained that "[He]'s bisexual, but in the realm of the show, we call him omnisexual, because on the show, [the characters] also have sex with aliens who take human form, and sex with male-male, women-women, all sorts of combinations." The term is also used once, in-universe, in the novel The House that Jack Built, when Ianto comments to a woman's remark about Jack, "He prefers the term 'omnisexual'."

=== Costume ===
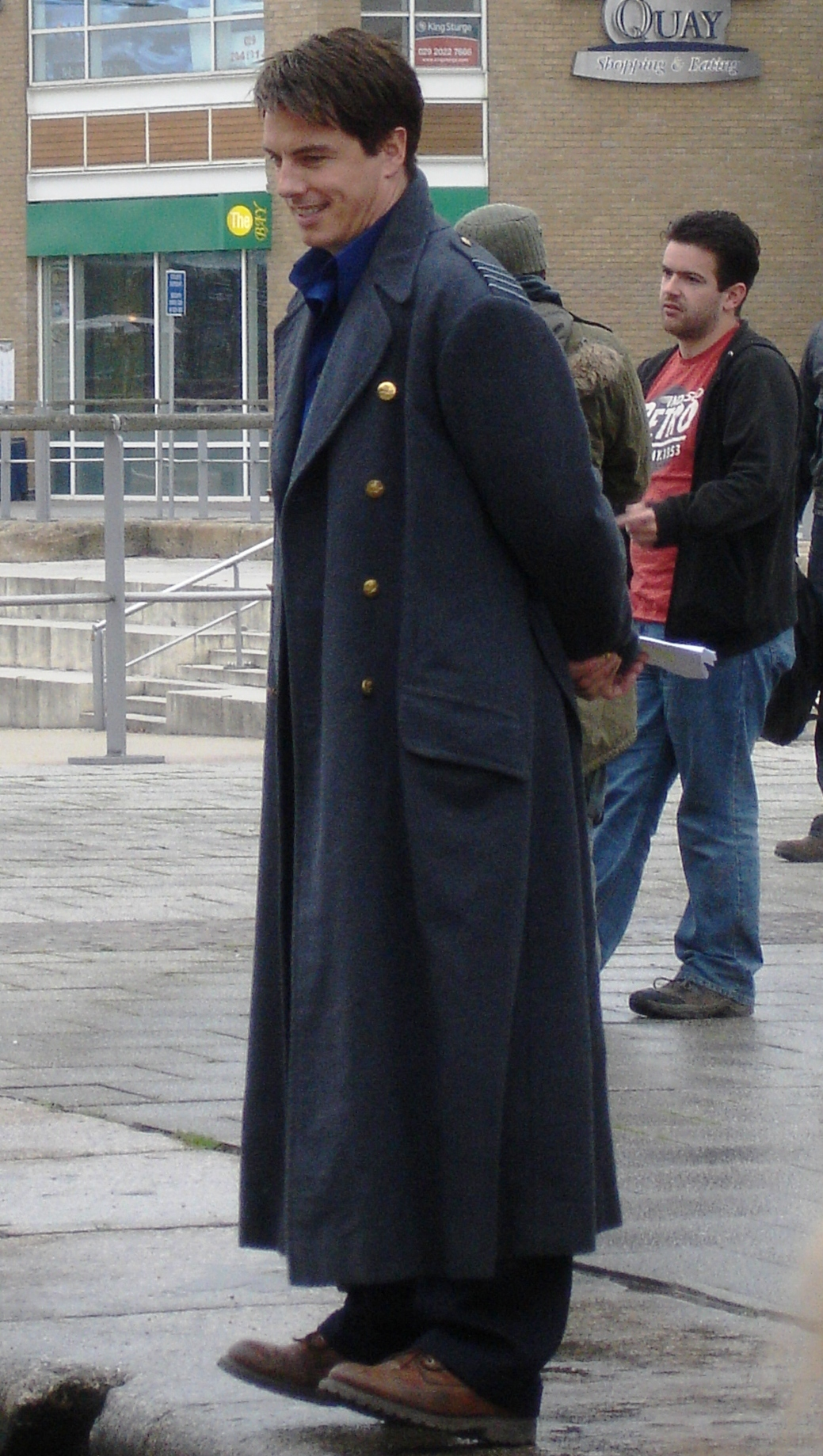
John Barrowman in Captain Jack's distinctive World War Two greatcoat during Torchwood filming.

While in his first several Doctor Who appearances, Jack did not have a set costume, Torchwood established a continual look for Jack which recalled that of his first Doctor Who appearance. The design has been described as "an iconic piece of sci-fi culture". A writer for Wired attributes much of Jack's appeal to the coat: "I think it has lots to do with that coat he always wears. Coats are cool, just like fezzes and bow ties and Stetsons. The only difference is that Captain Jack doesn't ever tell you his coat is cool. It just is." In fact, in her essay "Fashioning Masculinity and Desire", Sarah Gilligan attributes Torchwood's popularity—as well as that of the character—to the costume. She credits the greatcoat with helping to fashion the character's masculinity, and argues that Jack's costume creates its own discourse "through which costume drama and Post Heritage cinema's escapism flows".

During Jack's initial appearances in Doctor Who, Russell T Davies held a "half-hearted" theory that Jack would dress specific to the time period he was in, to contrast the Doctor who dresses the same wherever and whenever he goes. He is introduced wearing a greatcoat in World War II-set episodes, but changes to modern day jeans in contemporary episode "Boom Town" and black leather in futuristic episodes. Davies admits that this was a "bit of a lame idea" and decided that Jack "never looked better than when he was in his World War II outfit". From the pilot of Torchwood onwards, Harkness once again wears period military clothes from the second World War, including braces and an officer's wool greatcoat in every appearance. Costume designer Ray Holman commented in a Torchwood Magazine interview that "We always wanted to keep the World War Two hero look for him, so all his outfits have a 1940s flavour." Because the character was expected to "be running around a lot", Holman redesigned his RAF greatcoat from Doctor Who to make it more fluid and less "weighty". Jack's other costumes are "loosely wartime based", such as the trousers are "getting more and more styled to suit his figure". Holman explains that there are actually five Captain Jack coats used on the show. The "hero version" is used for most scenes, while there is also a wetcoat made with pre-shrunk fabric, running coat which is slightly shorter to prevent heels getting caught, and two "stunt coats" that had been "hero coats" in the first series." Davies feels the military uniform reinforces the idea that the character "likes his Captain Jack Harkness identity". Julie Gardner describes the coat as "epic and classic and dramatic", while director Brian Kelly believes it gives Jack "a sweep and a presence".

For Miracle Day, Davies commissioned new costume designer Shawna Trpcic (previously costume designer for Angel, Firefly and Dollhouse) to create a new greatcoat design. This was partially motivated by Los Angeles' warmer climate; shooting in Wales had necessitated Barrowman be fit in much warmer clothing. The new coat is custom made by Italian designers, and is actually cashmere-blend wool where the previous one had been cotton. Trpcic says that she "just wanted to modernise it, give it a more modern fit, but leave the drape and keep it cape-like". Trpcic felt prepared for the job of redesigning the coat because of her prior work on Firefly, tailoring for Nathan Fillion's Captain Malcolm Reynolds: "I'm kind of used to iconic captain's coats and the importance of staying loyal to what the fans expect and to what we need". Journalist Maureen Ryan commented that the new coat is "greatly improved" and the redesign "gives the coat the kind of movement and swagger Jack brings with him on every adventure".

=== Development ===
The character is described as both "lethally charming ... good looking and utterly captivating", as well as "flirtatious, cunning, clever and a bit of an action man". Within Doctor Who, Jack's personality is relatively light-hearted, although this changes in Torchwood's first series, where he becomes a darker character. In Torchwood's first series, Jack has been shaped by his ongoing search for the Doctor and also by his role as a leader, in which he is predominantly more aloof. In Torchwood, he would occasionally inquire or muse about the afterlife and religion, sympathising with a man's desire to die. Returning in Doctor Who Series Three, Jack indicates he now maintains a less suicidal outlook than before. In the second series of Torchwood, Jack became a much more light-hearted character once again, after appearances in Doctor Who where he was reunited with the Doctor. In the third series of Torchwood, the audience sees some of Jack's "darker side", as well as "the secrets that Jack has, the pressures, drama and the trauma he's carrying on his shoulders".

Lynnette Porter comments on Jack's relation to scholar Lord Raglan's theses on 'the hero' in fiction. Because Jack is immortal and always comes back from the dead, Porter argues that Jack cannot literally fulfil the "physical death aspect" of Raglan's criteria for a hero. However, Jack instead has several symbolic deaths. For instance, in the last scene of Children of Earth. Porter observes that camera angles emphasise Jack's profile as solitary man atop a hill in Cardiff, departing. This scene of "going away for good" against the backdrop of the city he has long protected, hints at the death of the Captain Jack persona; in Porter's words, "the immortal captain "dies" at the top of a hill in Wales at the conclusion of the "epic" miniseries", "epic" traditionally being the genre of heroism. The American political blog Daily Kos states Jack "can certainly be characterised as a Byronic hero, a tragic figure with a streak of melancholy, heroic yet misunderstood, bold yet rash. Most importantly, his sexuality is one single aspect of a much more complex, flawed character." G. Todd Davis examines the ways in which Jack conforms to the Byronic hero character trope. Physically, he identifies Jack as dark-haired and strikingly handsome, with masculine physique; he is intelligent and aware of it, to the point of a superiority complex; he demands unquestioning loyalty, has guilty secrets in his past, and is self-sacrificing. For this, Davis lists Jack alongside Milton's Satan from Paradise Lost, Shelley's Prometheus, and also Angel from Buffy, amongst others.

As a show, Torchwood is highly intertextual. The consequence of this is that many sides of Jack are shown across various media. One commentator feels that this emphasises Jack's pivotal place in the development and change of modern science fiction heroes. The character's unexpected popularity with a multitude of audiences, would later shape his appearances both as a traditional "action hero" and as a positive role model for younger viewers. Barrowman also remarks that "The beauty of Captain Jack, and one of the reasons why I think, as an actor, I've landed on my feet, is that he's popular with one audience in Torchwood and with another in Doctor Who."

==== Moral ambiguity ====
In several instances in Torchwood, Jack displays no qualms about killing a person of any species, which within Doctor Who, allows Jack's character to act in ways the lead character cannot. Barrowman remarks, "He'll do things the Doctor won't do ... [such as] fight. Jack will kill. And the Doctor, in a way, knows that, so he lets Jack do it. I'd say Jack's the companion-hero." A flashback in the third series of Torchwood shows Captain Jack sacrificing twelve children to aliens in order to save millions of lives. Davies feels that the third series of Torchwood is a "tale of retribution and perhaps redemption" for Captain Jack, who experiences "maximum damage" when his lover Ianto is killed. Davies chose to have Ianto die so that Jack would be damaged enough to sacrifice his grandson in order to destroy the same aliens.

When reuniting with the Doctor in the 2007 series of Doctor Who, he is told "don't you dare" when pointing a gun, and scolded when contemplating snapping the Master's neck. Witnessing the murder of his colleague Owen in Torchwood, Jack shoots his killer in the forehead, killing him in an act of swift revenge. Whilst the Doctor scolds Jack for joining the Torchwood Institute (an organisation he perceives as xenophobic and aggressive), Jack maintains that he reformed the Institute in the Doctor's image; Jack himself had initially been critical of the moral failings of a 19th-century Torchwood. Actor Gareth David-Lloyd describes the 19th century Torchwood as "quite ruthless and quite evil" and "on the other side" from Jack and the Doctor. Through Jack, whose perspective is widened by his experiences in other planets and times, the organisation was able to grow less jingoistic. One academic article, which compares Torchwood to the American drama series 24, opines that Jack's attitudes make the show's ethos largely antithetical to that of 24. Because Jack explores the "complexity of negotiating differing worldviews, cultural values, beliefs, and moral codes" through a framework established by the Doctor, to "value life, support democratic principles and egalitarianism, and protect those who cannot protect themselves", consequently "The world of Torchwood is depicted, not as the dichotomous "us" (or United States) and "other" of Jack Bauer's 24, but as the omnipolitical, omnisexual, omnicultural world of Jack Harkness." Porter finds, however, that like Bauer, Jack saves the world using similarly morally grey means when he tortures Beth the sleeper agent, in "Sleeper", in order to avert an interplanetary attack.

Although science fiction heroes have, Porter argues, "grown greyer over time", Jack represents as of Children of Earth a culmination of this trend, resulting in a full "devolution/deconstruction of the traditional hero". In Children of Earth, Jack has to sacrifice his own grandson to save the world. Barrowman was concerned that the storyline could have made the character unpopular. He believes however that Jack was given the tough decision on how to save humanity; the actor says "when I read all of the stuff he had to do, I had to look at it from the point of view of 'I'm Jack Harkness and I'm right'." For Lynnette Porter, Jack's actions in the serial make him "a benchmark for [morally] grey heroes"; some audiences may even view him, in light of his actions, as "villainous or downright monstrous." Although Jack ultimately saves the majority of the world's children and finds a way to foil the monstrous 456, the situation in which he is placed forces him to make a morally difficult (and to some viewers, reprehensible) decision. Such, Porter argues, is the mark of a grey hero. Davies stated in an interview with SFX that he "loved" the uproarious reaction to Jack's actions, defending the character in saying "He saved every single child in the world! If you would fail to do that then you're the monster, frankly. It's this extraordinary treatment that only science fiction heroes get." When Jack is departing Earth, the music playing is titled "Redemption", signifying that his departure is also perhaps his redeeming act in the serial.

==== Face of Boe ====
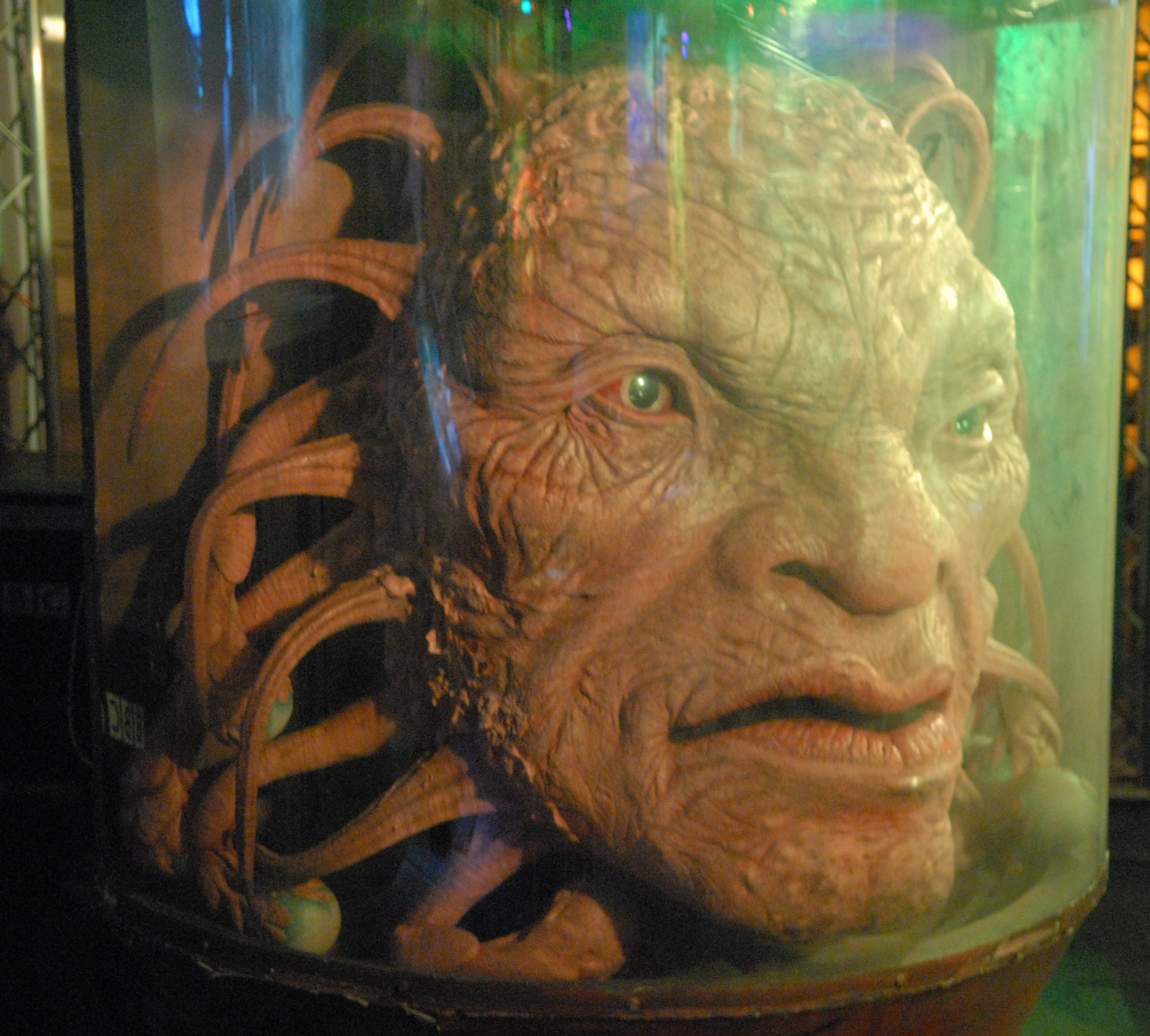
The Face of Boe animatronic on display at The Doctor Who Experience, Earls Court

Russell T Davies referred to a scene in "Last of the Time Lords" as promoting a theory that Jack may one day become recurring character "the Face of Boe" – a large, mysterious disembodied head in a glass case, the oldest creature in the known universe – as a consequence of Jack's immortality and slow aging. The Face of Boe first appeared in the 2005 episode "The End of the World", watching the final destruction of the long-abandoned Earth by the expansion of the Sun in the Earth year 5,000,000,000; Boe appears in two other episodes, "New Earth" (2006) and "Gridlock" (2007), and is mentioned in other episodes, such as his being "the oldest living creature in the Isop Galaxy" as of the Earth year 200,100, per "Bad Wolf" (2005). Barrowman described himself and David Tennant as being "so excited" to the extent where they "jumped up screaming" when they read Jack's line regarding the Face of Boe, remarking "It was probably the most excitable moment we had during the shooting of that series." The Face of Boe had originally been a throwaway line in a script for "The End of the World"; because creating the character seemed expensive, the Face of Boe was nearly discarded and replaced. However, special effects designer Neil Gorton loved the idea and pushed to make sure the character lived. Davies loved Gorton's design and to his surprise, the character was written into future episodes and became pivotal in the third series. In a spin-off novel, The Stealer of Dreams (2005), Captain Jack makes a reference to the Face of Boe as a famous figure. Davies conceived the idea that the two characters might be connected midway through the production of the 2007 series.

Barrowman states that when fans ask him if Jack is really the Face of Boe, he tells them he believes he is and states that he and Davies hold it to be true "in [their] little world"; the link is "unconfirmed" within the text of the show. As to how Jack becomes the Face, Barrowman feels the answer doesn't matter as it is intentionally mysterious. Barrowman likes the characters being connected because it means in spite of how the Doctor initially treats Jack, "Boe becomes his confidante and the one the Doctor returns to for advice and information" which he feels is a "wonderful twist of events". However, Davies chooses not to confirm (within the story's narrative) whether or not Jack really is the Face of Boe, stating "the moment it became very true or very false, the joke dies". He has refused the publication of spin-off novels and comic books that have tried to definitively link the two.

In relationship to Miracle Day, where Jack becomes mortal, critics approached Barrowman and Davies about the implications of such a move for Jack's potential future as the Face of Boe. Barrowman stated that the open-ended rules of the science fiction genre meant that Jack could still become the Face of Boe even after Miracle Day. By contrast, Davies was keen to emphasise that the possibility of Jack becoming the Face of Boe remained "conjecture", and that the possibility remained that Jack would not survive Miracle Day, adding "You know how I love killing people off."

=== Relationships ===
==== Ianto ====
In a Doctor Who Magazine interview, Barrowman described Jack's love for Ianto as "lustful", and explained "I don't think he'd settle down with Ianto. He might do, but he'd let Ianto know that he [Jack] has to play around on the side". The Torchwood Series Two premiere sees Jack ask Ianto out on a date, after finding out Gwen is engaged. John Barrowman and Gareth David-Lloyd opined in an interview at Comic-Con to fan questions that Jack's relationship with Ianto has however brought out Jack's empathy, and helped to ground him. John Barrowman said in an interview that Ianto "brings out the "human" in [Jack]" and "brings out more ... empathy because he's actually fallen for someone and he really cares about somebody ... [which] makes him warm to other people ... [and] makes him more approachable." In the same interview, Gareth David-Lloyd said of the relationship and his character that "I think Ianto's always made him care and that is really the heart of the show." However, Stephen James Walker feels that Jack's relationship with Ianto is one-sided; Ianto seems to feel the relationship is "serious and committed", but while dancing with Gwen in "Something Borrowed", Walker believes that Jack appears to equate his relationship with Ianto to nothing more than a "recreational activity", and considers it "obvious Jack only has eyes and thoughts for Gwen". The novel The House that Jack Built includes a scene where Ianto confides in Gwen that he knows that to Jack he is "just a shag", though discloses that the relationship means more to him. In the same novel, however, he also refers to himself in front of Jack as his "boyfriend". When Ianto expounds these same insecurities to Jack in the radio play "The Dead Line" (just prior to Children of Earth), however, Jack insists "You will never be just a blip in time, Ianto Jones. Not to me."

Just as Jack and Ianto's relationship is developing, Ianto dies, in Children of Earth (2009). While some fans felt "cheated" at not seeing the relationship develop further, Davies explains his intention was to heighten the tragedy by it also being a loss of potential, stating "You grieve over everything they could have been. Everything you hoped for them." For dramatic purposes within the story, Davies explains that Ianto's death was necessary so that Jack would be damaged enough to sacrifice his own grandson. Gareth David-Lloyd feels that the lack of resolution for the love story is "part of the tragedy". Lynnette Porter feels that Ianto's demise is intended as a watershed moment where Jack loses his effectiveness as a hero. At least for a time, a grieving Jack loses his focus and gives up; within a few months, Jack flees Earth and his role as the expected hero. Some fans were displeased by Ianto's death scene and the end of the relationship, and some even accused one the writers of "deliberately egging on the shippers'". Subsequent to Ianto's death, in "The End of Time" (2010), the Doctor sets up Jack with a new romantic interest, Alonso Frame (Tovey). Fans of Ianto, who felt cheated by the character's death, disliked this development. GayNZ.com compared the situation to Buffy fans' reaction to Willow's relationship with Kennedy (Iyari Limon) in Buffy's seventh season, following Tara's death in the show's sixth.

Ianto makes a post-death appearance in 2011 audio drama "The House of the Dead". Encountering Ianto's spirit at a haunted location in Wales, Jack and Ianto are permitted a final goodbye. Without Ianto in his life, Jack wishes to be swept up into the Cardiff spacetime rift as it closes in an attempt at suicide. Ianto tricks Jack into leaving the House of the Dead, however, despite the possibility of resurrection. As they are forced to part forever by the closing of the rift, the couple declare their love for one another for the first and last time.

==== Gwen ====
Barrowman states in a behind-the-scenes featurette that Gwen brings a "little bit of soul" back to Jack, following her recruitment. In a 2007 interview, Eve Myles, who plays Gwen, describes the relationship between Jack and Gwen as a "palpable love" and opines that "with Jack and Gwen, it's the real thing and they're going to make you wait for that." The first two series suggest the possibility of romantic and sexual tension behind Jack and Gwen's working relationship, with Stephen James Walker drawing on the firing range sequence in series one episode "Ghost Machine" as a key example, as well as the scene where Jack discovers that Gwen has become engaged to Rhys in "Kiss Kiss, Bang Bang", the series two opener. AfterElton.com's Locksley Hall conjectures that Jack is attracted to Gwen because of "her warmth, her sense of justice, her very ordinariness and lack of glamour", whilst Eve Myles explains Gwen's attraction to Jack by stating: "the most monogamous woman in the world would probably go for him – it'd be hard not to". Valerie Estelle Frankel describes Jack as a "compelling trickster", who acts out Gwen's private desires with his "outrageous flirting". She suggests that Jack (unlike Rhys) is not mature enough to occupy the role of "steady prince" for Gwen, whilst Barrowman feels that if Jack were to settle down with her, "he'd have to commit completely"; this is why he does not act on his feelings, because though Gwen would let him flirt with other people, he could "never afford to do anything more". Gareth David-Lloyd, who played Ianto, feels that for Jack, "there's two different sorts of love going on there", and that Jack feels for Gwen and Ianto in different ways, although both have helped him become less emotionally isolated. Lynnette Porter feels that part of the reason Jack leaves Earth at the conclusion of Children of Earth is Gwen's idealisation of Jack, which is so intense that he cannot stand to look at her in the wake of Ianto's death. Gwen hopes that she is reason enough for Jack to stay on Earth, but Jack is ready to give up any hero worship because he feels unworthy.

A press release for Torchwood Series Four states that Jack is brought back to Earth because of his "unstated love" for Gwen, who in turn still feels for Jack and misses the exciting life she once led beside him. Whilst Miracle Day lead writer Russell T Davies states in response to a question posed by AfterElton that he "hates" the idea of romantic tension between Gwen and Jack, executive producer Julie Gardner answers by stating "They love each other. Of course they do." Myles believes that in series four, Gwen and Jack have a "love-hate-love relationship" resembling in different ways a sibling relationship, a marital relationship and also "the strongest friendship". Episode seven of Miracle Day features a scene where Jack threatens Gwen with violence after she states she would have him killed to save her daughter. Writer Jane Espenson explains that the two characters have different needs and that this means they inevitably "clash like steel blades". Simon Brew of Den of Geek praises the dynamic between Gwen and Jack in series four, describing them as "a terrific double act" and states that "Torchwood is at, or near, its best when the two of them are working in tandem".

==== Other ====
"He always loses them. He outlives them. They die. He watches them get old. That bothered him in Series One [of Torchwood], but now he's come to terms with that, I think ... so now he just sleeps around!"

— John Barrowman on why his character could never find a soulmate.

Discussing whether his character could ever find "The One", John Barrowman asserts that Jack "likes everybody, and his love for each person is different". Barrowman believes that Jack does harbour romantic feelings toward the Doctor, but "would never take that beyond infatuation" and "would never let the Doctor know". Barrowman claims that Jack also "fancies" fellow companion Martha Jones, admiring her "tenacity" and willingness to "spat with him", and describes Jack's love for Toshiko and Owen as "fatherly", stating "He was guiding them. That's why it was so devastating for him to lose them." The second series of Torchwood also introduced Jack's ex-lover, Captain John. Head writer Chris Chibnall introduced John to act as a "proper nemesis, somebody to really test [Jack], to push him, and to reveal something about Jack's character". In the use of Captain John as a literary foil, Chibnall comments "you see the way Jack could have gone, and probably did, for a little while" which underlines how "Jack, in his experiences with the Doctor and Torchwood, made a very conscious decision to move away from that behaviour."

In their academic publication, Queer TV, Glyn Davis and Gary Needham discuss Jack's role within Torchwood as a post-gay, romantic hero. Noting Torchwood's central gay themes, they comment that "it is through the character of Captain Jack that Torchwood is able to mine its queerness." Discussing Jack's brief romance with his namesake, the real Captain Jack (Matt Rippy), academic critics have noted that "The Captain Jacks both share the same name and are quite similar in physical appearance, thus literalising the homo-ness of the situation. Through the time-travel device this points to a narcissistic self-fascination, the old cliché that homosexuality is the love for sameness." Other relationships which have been described or alluded to (both in the television series and other media) include ex-girlfriends Estelle Cole, Duchess Eleanor, Stella Courtney, and Lucia Moretti, ex-boyfriends and Angelo Colasanto, as well as an unnamed ex-wife.

Describing the patterns of his relationships throughout the series, Davis and Needham draw the conclusion that "while Captain Jack desires both men and women, his long-term love affairs and onscreen kisses are mostly with men in the past and present." Davies himself laments that this one of the pitfalls of writing a bisexual character, commenting "The trap you fall into with bisexual men is only having them sleep with men." Commenting on the show's postmodern attitude towards bisexuality, or in what Russell T Davies calls "omnisexuality", they continue to remark that "His character brushes against definitions of queer sexuality in that he resists any sort of classification based on sexual orientation." They also comment on the subtexts of particular episodes, such as gay time-travel romance episode "Captain Jack Harkness", and within that the relevance of time-travelling Jack Harkness to tackle the question of forbidden gay attraction in what is post-Brokeback television. In Understanding TV Texts by Phil Wickham, Wickham opines that Captain Jack explicitly "brings to the fore" with his "brazen bisexuality", "something we have to come to expect [from Russell T Davies] as viewers of his work". Fans expressed fear that an Americanized fourth series of the show would mean the show would no longer portray Jack's bisexuality, but Davies assured interviewers that Jack's interests in both men and women would be honoured.

== Critical reception and impact ==
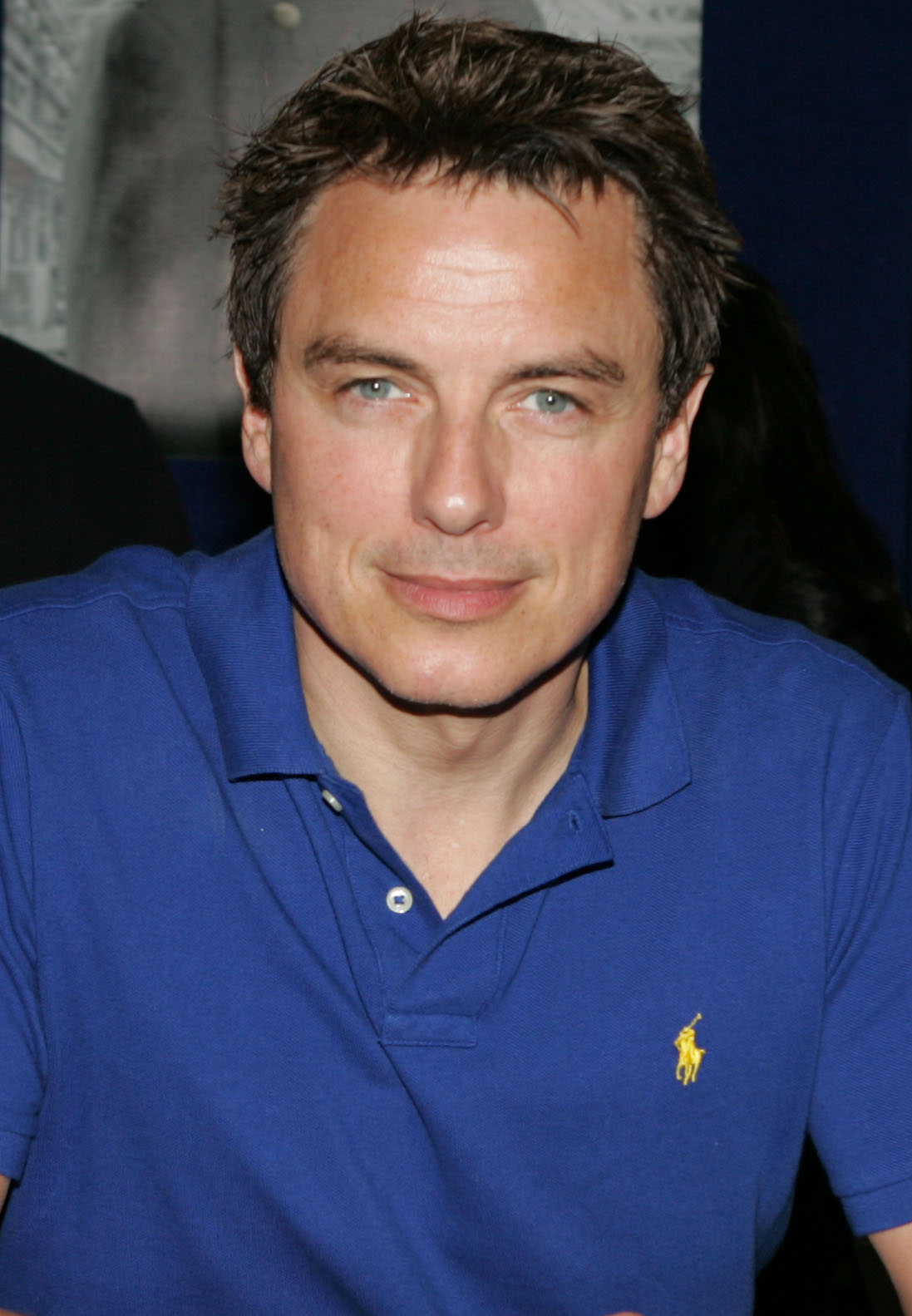
Portraying Harkness has raised John Barrowman's profile.

Following the character's initial introduction in the revived series 1 of Doctor Who, the character became incredibly popular with fans, to the extent that Russell T Davies and Julie Gardner created a spin-off series, Torchwood, primarily centred around the character. The Times described the undeniable success of the character as having propelled actor John Barrowman to "National Treasure status". For his role as Captain Jack, John Barrowman was nominated for Best Actor at the 2007 BAFTA Cymru Awards, and again for Children of Earth at the 2010 TV Choice Awards, against Eleventh Doctor actor Matt Smith. Harkness was also listed number nine in TV Squad's "Ten Most mysterious characters on television", behind the Tenth Doctor, who was listed number three. John Barrowman, who is himself gay, has ranked in the Independent on Sunday Pink List, a list of the most influential gay people in Britain, in 2007, 2008, and 2009 with the Independent commenting that "Proof of his popularity came with the continued runaway success of his bisexual Captain Jack Harkness on Russell T Davies's Torchwood". Part of Jack's mystique was his sex appeal, swashbuckling heroism and sexual appetite. In anticipation of the character's return to Doctor Who in series 3 after a successful run in the first series of Torchwood, mainstream media hailed his return.

Captain Jack has gone on to become a recognisable figure in the British public consciousness, and has attracted some parody. These parodies frequently echo criticisms both of the character and of Barrowman's portrayal. The character of Jack Harkness has been parodied several times on the satirical impressionist television show Dead Ringers. Played by Jon Culshaw, the show pokes fun at his bisexuality and apparent campness, as well his melodramatic personality in Torchwood. In one sketch, he walks bizarrely towards the camera, kissing a policeman as he passes him. In another sketch, he can be seen having a threesome with two Cybermen, a race of cyborgs from Doctor Who. Satirical technology columnist Verity Stob wrote a parody of Torchwood Season One in the style of Dylan Thomas's radio play Under Milk Wood, called Under Torch Wood. This parody described Captain Jack as "the insomniac bicon; snug as a hobbit, pretty as a choirboy, immortal as carbon dioxide, wooden as a horse." Barrowman's ubiquity, however, has even provoked criticism of the character. Jim Shelley of the Daily Mirror, in his review of Children of Earth, said "Unlike David Tennant's Doctor, Barrowman's endless appearances on friendly drivel like Tonight's the Night, The Kids Are All Right and Any Dream Will Do, is so over-exposed, 'Captain Jack' is about as intriguing or alien as a Weetabix and twice as irritating. Unlike Tennant, as an actor he is just not good enough." Television journalist Charlie Brooker, in his Screenwipe review of 2009 criticised Barrowman, with focus on his acting. "Harkness is of course a man of mystery. You can't tell what he's thinking just by looking at his face... no matter how hard Barrowman tries."

The character's recognisability extends outside the UK. In a Halloween episode of the 2008 series of American drama Knight Rider, character Billy Morgan (Paul Campbell) dresses up as Captain Jack, whom he refers to as "the time-travelling bisexual". Jack represents a new character archetype, which other writers have begun to draw from. For example, comic book writer Peter David reflects that in writing Marvel Comics character Shatterstar, he "to some degree... key[s] his personality off Captain Jack Harkness" insofar as he is "swashbuckling, enthusiastic and sexually curious about anything with a pulse". In 2009, Barrowman's variety show Tonight's the Night broadcast a specially written humorous Doctor Who scene scripted by Russell T Davies. In the scene, Barrowman appears initially as Captain Jack confronting an alien on board the TARDIS who claims to be the Doctor. However, David Tennant appears as himself and John Barrowman is revealed as playing Captain Jack in the TARDIS set. Action figures have also been created in the actor's likeness, which Barrowman says was a "longtime dream".

I do watch a lot of television science fiction, and it is a particularly sexless world. With a lot of the material from America, I think gay, lesbian and bisexual characters are massively underrepresented, especially in science fiction, and I'm just not prepared to put up with that. It's a very macho, testosterone-driven genre on the whole, very much written by straight men. I think Torchwood possibly has television's first bisexual male hero, with a very fluid sexuality for the rest of the cast as well. We're a beacon in the darkness.

— Russell T Davies

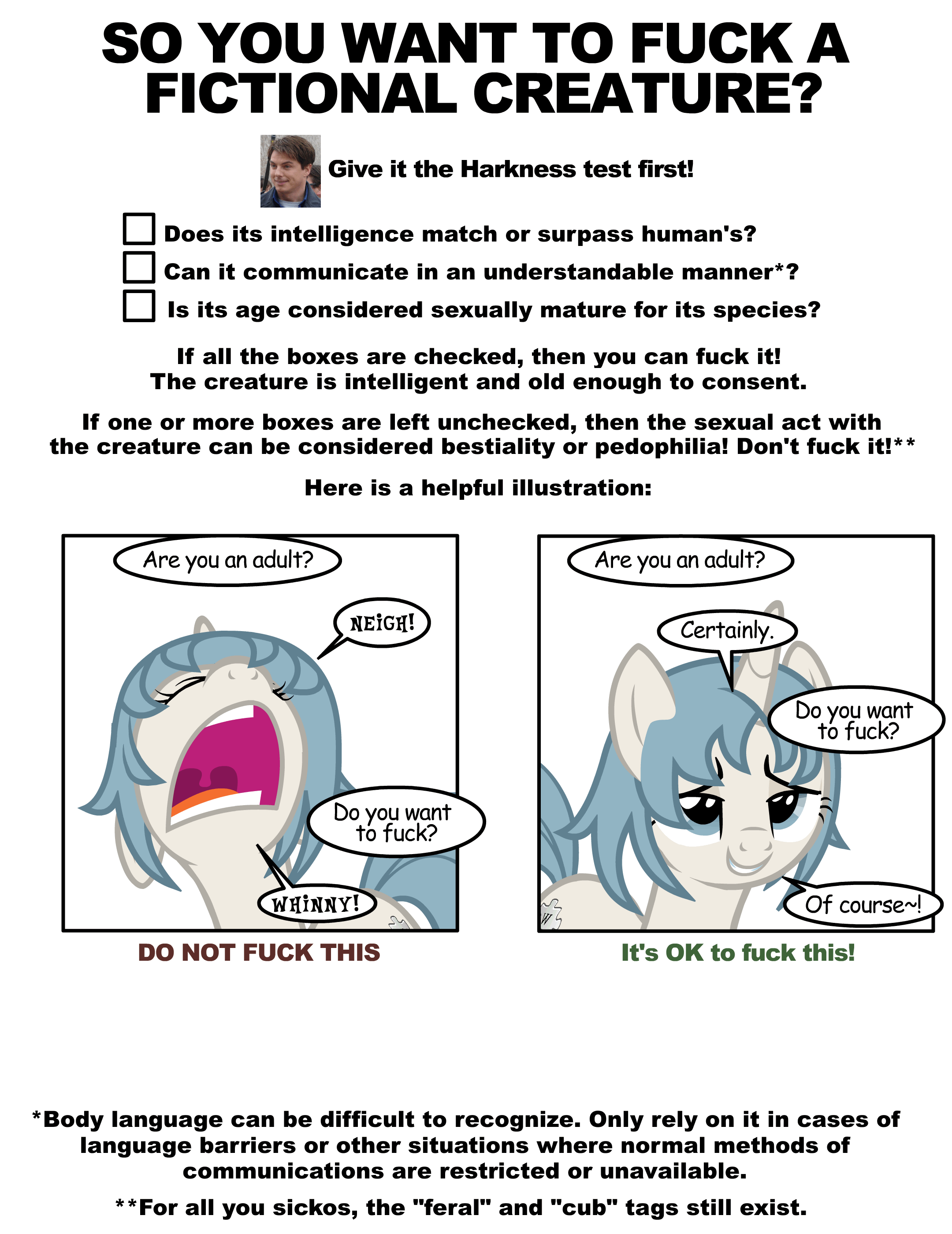
A ponified (ponysona) version of Wikipe-tan referencing the Harkness Test meme.

Starting in 2013, Jack's sexuality has made him the subject of an internet meme for discussing the ethics of sexual encounters with nonhuman characters. Known as the Harkness Test, it emerged on social media and is used as a measure for whether or not a fictional character is appropriate to have sexual relations with.

In the media, Jack is described as both the "first openly gay companion" and as a "hunky bisexual". Jack's notability is largely due to his mainstream representation of a bisexual man in science fiction television, for whom sexual identity is "matter-of-fact", and not an issue. The ordinariness with which Jack's orientation is regarded within Doctor Who embodies part of a political statement about changing societal views of homosexuality. The distinct flexibility of Jack's sexuality contributed directly towards the character's popularity and public interest. The overtness of Jack's sexuality broke new grounds, the labels "pansexual" and "omnisexual" being applied to the character on occasion. In "The Parting of the Ways", Jack kissed both Rose and the Doctor on the lips, the latter being the first same-sex kiss in the history of the program. Despite the boldness of the first non-heterosexual character in the series' run, there has been very little uproar about the character, although there was some controversy at the time of Jack's introduction. Speculating, Barrowman tries to link Jack's popularity with this portrayal, noting "I think audiences just get Jack because he's honest ... to finally see a character who doesn't care who he flirts with, I think is a bit refreshing."

The presence of the character in prime time television sparked discussion of the nature of bisexuality in a number of outlets where normally it is dismissed or overlooked. Channel4.com cites Jack as a positive role model for gay and bisexual teenagers, where little had been present for this audience in years gone by and subsequently leading to a greater culture of tolerance. Dr Meg-John Barker writes for the Journal of Bisexuality that although "the b word does not actually get used during the show", Jack is one of the first positive and clearly bisexual characters on British television. They do point out however that Jack retains some elements of bisexual stereotyping, particularly in his "flamboyant" promiscuity. Jack has also been cited in America to contrast the portrayals of non-heterosexual characters in mainstream television in the US and the UK. Gary Scott Thompson, producer of the 2008 revival of Knight Rider, said, "If I could use Jack in Torchwood as a role model—I would absolutely use him as a role model—I love his conflictedness about ... everybody".

Readers of AfterElton.com voted Jack the tenth best gay or bisexual television character of all time, the poll itself ultimately being won by Brian Kinney, a character from the North American version of Queer as Folk which was developed by Ron Cowen and Daniel Lipman from the British series created by Russell T Davies. The website praised Jack—one of only two bisexual characters on the list of 25—for being having both "tough" and "tender" sides to his personality, as seen in the Torchwood episode "Captain Jack Harkness". Amongst science fiction characters, Jack also topped another AfterElton rundown of top characters, beating Hellblazer's John Constantine for the top spot, commenting upon Jack's representation of a "'post-gay' approach to sexual themes" and awarding him a full 10/10 for cultural significance. For the AfterElton 2008 Visibility Awards, Jack won the award for Favourite TV Character. The website commented that "unlike virtually every other TV sci-fi character, lead or supporting, Captain Jack is also openly bisexual. Ironically, this "small" change served to help make the science fiction genre, long the ultimate bastion of straight men, accessible not just to LGBT people, but also straight women, who also enjoy the show's alternative take on sexuality." The third award won for Torchwood, after Favourite TV Drama and Character, was won by Jack and Ianto for Best Couple, for which the editor commented "Torchwood is revolutionary not just because the producers dare to put openly bisexual (or in Jack's case "omnisexual") characters in the formerly sacrosanct setting of sci-fi; it's also that it presents these bisexual characters in such an amazingly matter-of-fact way. There's no apologizing, no minimizing, and no moralizing—just good, old-fashioned romance and adventure."
