= Jonathan Barnes (author) =

British writer

Jonathan Barnes is a British writer, whose debut novel, The Somnambulist, was published in 2007. He is also the author of The Domino Men (2008), an indirect sequel.

Barnes earned a first-class degree in English literature from the University of Oxford. He currently lives in Norfolk and contributes reviews for The Times Literary Supplement.
