= List of Canadian podcasts =

The following is a list of Canadian podcasts.

== List ==
Podcast	Year	Starring, Narrator(s), or Host(s)	Produced by	Ref
24 Shades of Blue	2020–present	Andy O'Brien and Axel Villamil	Obie & Ax Inc	
Alba Salix, Royal Physician	2014-			|
Canadaland	2013–present	Jesse Brown	Canadaland (independent)	
Crackdown	2019–present	Garth Mullins	Cited Media	
Definitely Not the Opera	1994–2016	Sook-Yin Lee and Nora Young	CBC Radio	
Galacticast	2006–present	Casey McKinnon, Rudy Jahchan	Independent (created by the hosts)	
The Age of Persuasion	2006–2011	Terry O'Reilly and Mike Tennant	Pirate Radio & Television, Toronto (season 1-4), Pirate Toronto & New York (season 5)	
The Digital Sisterhood	2020–present	Cadar Mohamud (and collective of Black Muslim women)	Independent (Toronto-based collective)	
The Heart	2008–present	Kaitlin Prest (creator); Nicole Kelly & Phoebe Unter (2020–present)	Radiotopia	
Let's Make	2022–present	Ryan Beil, Maddy Kelly, Mark Chavez	Kelly & Kelly / CBC	
Lex pacificatoria	2023–present		Michael J. Campbell	
Love To Sew	2017–present	Helen Wilkinson, Caroline Somos	Independent (hosts)	
The Night Time Podcast	2015–present	Jordan Bonaparte	Corus Entertainment	
The Social	2013–present	Cynthia Loyst, Jessica Allen, Andrea Bain	CTV	
Norm Macdonald Live	2013–2017	Norm Macdonald, Adam Eget	Jash	
PlayMe	2016–present	Chris Tolley, Laura Mullin	CBC (digital division)	
Podcast Playlist	2015–2024	Various (Sean Rameswaram, Matt Galloway, Lindsay Michael, Nana aba Duncan, Elamin Abdelmahmoud, Leah-Simone Bowen, others)	CBC (Kate Evans, Julian Uzielli, Kelsey Cueva)	
Q	2007–present	Jian Ghomeshi (2007–2014), Shad (2015–2016), Tom Power (2016–present)	CBC Radio One	
Radio Free Skaro	2006–present	Steven Schapansky, Warren Frey, Christopher Burgess	Independent (listener-supported)	
Red Panda Adventures	2005–present	Gregg Taylor (The Red Panda), Clarissa Der Nederlanden Taylor (The Flying Squirrel)	Decoder Ring Theatre	
Stop Podcasting Yourself	2008–present	Graham Clark and Dave Shumka	Maximum Fun	
Under the Influence	2012–present	Terry O'Reilly	CBC Radio One (Debbie O'Reilly)	
The Night Time Podcast	2015–present	Jordan Bonaparte	Corus Entertainment	
Vinyl Tap	2005–2023	Randy Bachman	CBC (initially); later Orbyt Media / Corus	
