= Cool Mules =

2021 podcast from Canadaland

- Genre: True crime

Cast and voices
- Hosted by: Kasia Mychajlowycz

Publication
- No. of episodes: 6
- Original release: 2 March – 29 March 2020
- Provider: Canadaland

Related
- Website: www.coolmules.ca

Cool Mules is a podcast by Canadaland about a cocaine-smuggling ring led by Slava Pastuk that operated within Vice Media.

It won a National Magazine Awards Gold Award for best podcast in 2021.

== Production ==
Cool Mules was produced and co-written by Jesse Brown; Kasia Mychajlowycz was the host, reporter and producer, Jonathan Goldsbie did research, Nathan Burley did the music, and Chandra Bulucon did the sound design and mixing.

It was released in six parts, the first of which was released on March 2, 2020.

== Synopsis ==
The podcast tells the story of Toronto-based Yaroslav Pastukhov/Slava Pastuk, a Vice Media music editor who goes by the pseudonym of Slava P. The story takes placed between 2014 and 2016, in which Slava P recruits younger Vice employees into an international cocaine-smuggling ring.

Themes in the podcast include the gig-economy, worker exploitation, and the line between journalists reporting news and creating news.

== Critical reception ==
In 2021, Cool Mules won a Digital Publishing Awards Gold Award for best podcast (arts & culture) from the National Magazine Awards.

Maxine Betteridge-Moes writing for Smack Media described the podcast as refreshing and fascinating. Lizzy Steiner, writing in CrimeReads writes "host Kasia Mychajlowycz painstaking unpacks a crime that seems custom-built for the millennial generation."

US corporation Storied Media Group bought the rights to the story.

== See also ==
- Bad Trips, 2022 by Slava Pastuk about the same subject.
