= Bad Trips =

2022 non-fiction book by Slava Pastuk

- Author: Slava Pastuk and Brian Whitney
- Publisher: Dundurn Press
- Publication date: 2022
- ISBN: 9781459749276

Bad Trips is a 2022 non-fiction book by Slava Pastuk. In the book Pastuk documents cocaine smuggling while working as a music editor at Vice Media.

== Production ==
Bad Trips: How I Went from VICE Reporter to International Drug Smuggler is co-written by Slava Pastuk and Brian Whitney. Whitney will collect all the royalties for the book. Published by Dundurn Press, it was acquired and edited by Russell Smith.

== Author ==
Pastuk's full name is Yuroslav Pastukhov.

== Synopsis ==
The book documents Pastuk's life that started with his birth in Ukraine, and emigrated with his mother to Canada. He lived in Barrie, before moving to Toronto at the age of 19 for a marketing job, that he then quit to work for Noisey Canada, part of Vice Media. At Vice, he reports being encouraged to use cocaine and doing so. He started DJing as a side job and selling marijuana to people he met on Grindr. In 2015, his drug dealing escalated and he earned $20,000 from helping a drug cartel smuggle cocaine from Australia to Canada. After boasting about his smuggling at work, he recruited five colleagues: Jordan Gardner, Robert Wang, Porscha Wade, Nathaniel Carty, and Ketiba Senusi into the smuggling efforts, but they failed and were arrested. Each of the five were sentenced to between three and four years in prison.

Pastuk was fired from Vice after news of his activities reached Vice management and the front page of the National Post newspaper. In 2018, Pastuk was arrested and in 2019 jailed for nine years.

== Critical reception ==
Alan MacKenzie of the Winnipeg Free Press describes the book as entertaining, but Pastuk's self-importance as exhausting and notes his lack of remorse. Publishers Weekly called it "a riveting cautionary tale."

== See also ==
- Cool Mules, Canadaland podcast about the same subject.
