= Night Time =

Night Time may refer to:

- The Night Time Podcast, an audio documentary series covering Canadian crime, mysteries, and strange stories
- "Night Time" (song), a 1966 hit by The Strangeloves, covered by The J. Geils Band
- "Night Time" (The xx song), 2009 song by The xx on their xx LP
- Night Time (album), a 1985 LP by Killing Joke
- Night Time (ITV), a name used for various overnight TV services on the ITV network in the UK during the 1980s and 1990s

== See also ==
- Night (disambiguation)
