= Thunder Bay (TV series) =

Canadian documentary television series

- Series poster
- Genre: Television documentary
- Created by: Ryan McMahon
- Based on: Thunder Bay by Ryan McMahon
- Written by: Ryan McMahon; Michael Allcock
- Directed by: Ryan McMahon; Leslie Lucas
- Narrated by: Ryan McMahon
- Country of origin: Canada
- Original languages: English, French
- No. of seasons: 1
- No. of episodes: 4

Production
- Executive producers: Ryan McMahon; Jesse Brown; Jocelyn Hamilton; Toby Dormer
- Producers: Ryan McMahon; Leslie Lucas; Joanne Loton
- Production locations: Thunder Bay, Ontario
- Running time: 45–51 minutes
- Production companies: Entertainment One; Bell Media

Original release
- Network: Crave
- Release: February 17 – February 24, 2023

Thunder Bay is a Canadian 4-part documentary television series that premiered February 17, 2023 on Crave. Adapted from Ryan McMahon's 2018 Canadaland podcast Thunder Bay, the series explores the deaths of indigenous teenagers in Thunder Bay, Ontario.

== Episodes ==
Thunder Bay episodes
No. overall	No. in season	Title	Original release date
1	1	"Murder Capital #1"	February 17, 2023
2	2	"Whodunit"	February 17, 2023
3	3	"No Foul Play"	February 24, 2023
4	4	"The Hive"	February 24, 2023
