= Barbara Kentner =

Anishinaabe women from Thunder Bay (1982 to 2017)

- Born: August 21, 1982; Dryden, Ontario, Canada
- Died: July 4, 2017 (aged 34); Thunder Bay, Ontario, Canada
- Cause of death: Infection, resulting from trauma

Barbara Kentner (August 21, 1982 – July 4, 2017) was an Indigenous woman from Wabigoon Lake First Nation who died in 2017, six months after being struck by a trailer hitch thrown at her by Brayden Bushby from a moving vehicle in Thunder Bay, Ontario, Canada.

Bushby was found guilty of manslaughter and sentenced to eight years in jail. He was granted full parole in August, 2026, a decision greeted with anger among Wabigoon and First Nations' leadership across Ontario.

== Family life ==
Kentner was born on August 21, 1982, in Dryden, Ontario, the eldest of four sisters to truck driver father Roy Boucher and mother Mildred (née Maude) Kentner.

Kentner had lived with liver disease in a palliative care facility. She grew up in Thunder Bay and had four half-siblings. Kentner was Anishinaabe and from Wabigoon Lake First Nation. Two sisters were quoted in Canadian media at the time of her death, describing the impact of the murder. Kentner has a daughter, Serena Jane Kentner, who was 16 years old in January 2017. Her daughter has acute myeloid leukaemia and had a bone marrow transplant in 2020. Kentner's father died of a heart attack in 2002 and her mother died of cancer in 2004.

== Events of 29 January 2017 ==
At approximately 1am on 29 January 2017, 18-year-old Brayden Bushby was in the passenger seat of a vehicle driving on McKenzie Street in the south side area of Thunder Bay. Three other friends were in the vehicle, and Bushby was intoxicated with alcohol, after spending the day drinking straight whisky. Bushby is white.

Kentner, and her three-years-younger sister Melissa, were walking down McKenzie Street towards a relative's home when Bushby threw a metal trailer hitch, which struck Kentner in the abdomen. Bushby exclaimed "got one" after the hitch struck Kentner. Kentner was 34-years-old at the time of the attack. The incident ruptured her small intestine.

== Death ==
Kentner died on July 4, 2017, at St. Joseph's Hospice in Thunder Bay as she received surgery to tackle an infection from the injury. Kentner's lawyers stated that the infection was caused by the blunt force trauma of the attack.

== Post-death events ==
Bushby was initially charged with second-degree murder, but that charge was later downgraded. Bushby admitted to throwing the hitch and pled guilty to aggravated assault, before being found guilty of manslaughter. In February 2021, he was sentenced to eight years in jail.

The attack on Kentner is discussed in the Thunder Bay podcast from Canadaland along with wider concerns about corruption within Thunder Bay and violence against Indigenous women and girls. Bushby's parole in August 2026 was widely criticized. In a statement the Chiefs of Ontario criticized the parole board process, the lack of recent representation from Kentner's family, and the short sentence for the crime of murder:

What weighs on [us] most is learning that Barbara’s family may not have even been told this hearing was taking place. They were represented by impact statements made years ago, while Brayden Bushby was able to speak to who he is today. Barbara’s family deserved that same opportunity. They deserved to be in the room. They deserved to be heard.

A protest march took place in Ottawa on August 31, 2026. The CBC reports that Bushby was paroled despite failing to report a vehicle collision to his case management team, obtaining a Confederate flag tattoo, and cutting a swastika into the lawn of a federal institution. Protest over Busby's parole follows a string of similar criticism levelled at the Canadian federal government and the parole board, particularly the case of Robert Picton who was eligible for day parole despite murdering and raping twenty-six women, many of them Indigenous.
