= Jonathan Goldsbie =

Canadian reporter and podcaster

- Occupations: Journalist, Editor
- Employer: Canadaland
- Notable work: Cool Mules (podcast)
- Awards: National Magazine Award, 2021

Jonathan Goldsbie is a Canadian journalist, and currently the news editor for Canadaland. He has previously worked as a performance artist and as columnist at The National Post, NOW Newspaper and Torontoist.

He won a National Magazine Award in 2021.

== Career ==
Goldsbie was previously a member of Toronto's Public Space Committee, and has worked as a columnist for The National Post, NOW Newspaper and Torontoist. At Now Newspaper, Goldsbie was the chair of Unifor union-led employee bargaining committee.

He is well known for his Twitter account @goldsbie, where he Tweets about Toronto politics. In 2012, Goldsbie organized the performance art piece Route 501 Revisited as part the Free Fall theatre festival, in which he rented a street car and invited anyone to take Toronto's 501 Streetcar Route, in silence, but with Twitter conversation.

In 2022, Goldsbie discovered and Tweeted about 2015 to 2021 homophobic social media posts by newly appointed Toronto City Councillor Rosemarie Bryan, resulting in her resignation the same day.

Goldsbie is the news editor of Canadaland and was part of a team that received an honourable mention, after being a finalist at the Digital Publishing Award for their coverage of the WE Charity scandal in 2021. He received a Bucham Grove Press award for his Wag The Doug podcast work. In 2021, he was part of the team that won gold at the National Magazine Awards as the producer of Cool Mules podcast about Vice (magazine) editor Slava Pastuk's cocaine smuggling.

== Personal life ==
Goldsbie is Jewish, and is noted for his love of theatre.
