= Gaza genocide denial =

Gaza genocide denial constitutes the efforts to deny that Israel is committing genocide against Palestinians during the Gaza war. It includes challenging the scale and intent of Israeli military actions, casting doubt on casualty statistics, reframing Israel's actions as lawful self-defense, and portraying critics as antisemitic or aligned with Hamas. Observers say that such rhetoric mirrors long-established patterns in other cases of genocide denial – such as the denial of the Armenian genocide – employing strategies of deflection, victim-blaming, moral inversion, and legalistic reinterpretation. As with other cases of genocide denial, it includes efforts to suppress information and criticism.

Besides being the position of the government of Israel, other states that reject the classification of Gaza as genocide include supporters of Israel such as the United States and Germany, as well as the United Kingdom.

== Background ==
Sociologist Stanley Cohen pioneered research into genocide denial, identifying three forms of denial: "literal denial (it is untrue, or it did not happen), interpretative denial (what happened is actually something else; the facts are given a different meaning) and implicatory denial (what is denied or minimized are the psychological, political and moral implications of the facts)." Cohen also applied his theory of denialism to Israeli society in multiple publications in the 1990s and 2000s. He considered Israel a special case because "it is a nation of democrats who knowingly identify with the mission of denying Palestinians equal rights." Cohen wrote that while most people did not believe blatant falsehoods about discriminatory Israeli government actions, they came to believe in myths that painted Israeli Jewish society in a good light. Rene van Swaaningen, Bas van Stokkom, and Hans Nelen write that over time, Israel became less concerned with outside perceptions and replaced legalistic countering of Amnesty International reports with "propaganda and disinformation".

== Rhetoric ==
Genocide scholar Martin Shaw has argued that the early period of the Gaza war saw considerable literal denial, but that this rapidly shifted to interpretative denial, and the use of rhetorical strategies to define the killing as other than genocide, and later still to implicatory denial, "in which the wrongdoing is (partly) acknowledged, but it is often added that there was a necessity or at least no other option".

Political scientist Omar Shahabudin McDoom and others have identified several techniques of denial:

1. "Framing large-scale violence as both a legal right and a moral duty" – synthesizing claims of self-defense and minimizing Israeli agency in a form of interpretative denial.
2. Deflecting all blame to Hamas for starting the war and allegedly using human shields, a kind of implicatory denial that ignores the history of the Israeli–Palestinian conflict prior to 2023.
3. Claiming that Israel is unfairly singled out for allegations of genocide – an example of whataboutism – as part of an orchestrated campaign, motivated by antisemitism or anti-Zionism and intended to delegitimize the state of Israel. For example, major newspapers such as The New York Times, The Washington Post, and The Wall Street Journal published editorials denying the genocide and calling the allegations "a moral obscenity", a "blood libel", and a "media manufactured genocide".
4. Claiming that Israel goes to great lengths to avoid civilian casualties and has "the best civilian-combatant kill ratio in the world".
5. Claiming that if Israel were engaged in genocide, all Gazans would have been killed long ago. Contrary to this argument, Israeli leaders have publicly acknowledged that they are constrained by the need to maintain international support and a measure of political legitimacy.
6. Delegitimizing the accuser, including accusations that those who bring up genocide support Hamas or are motivated by antisemitic views.
7. Dehumanizing the victims.
8. Demonizing Israel's enemies while emphasizing Israel's alleged superior moral character.
9. Exaggerating the threat posed by Hamas.
10. Redirecting compassion from Palestinians to victims of the 7 October attacks.
11. Trivializing and/or normalizing violence as inevitably occurring during wartime, such as through asserting that all civilian destruction is "collateral damage". These arguments ignore evidence to the contrary such as a casualty ratio skewed towards civilians, including many children.
12. Pointing to irrelevant information such as Gaza's long term population growth, in a strategic attempt to misdirect or derail the discussion.

Separately, Genocide Watch has identified twelve rhetorical strategies of denial: "Minimize deaths", arguing that all statistics are inaccurate; "Attack truth-tellers [as] 'antisemitic', liars, or Hamas sympathizers"; "Deny intent. Civilian deaths are unintentional 'collateral damage' in self-defense"; "Dehumanization"; "Blame Ancient Conflict"; "Blame mistakes" to portray civilian deaths as an unfortunate accident; "Claim appeasement. Critics are appeasing Hamas killers, rapists, and genocidists"; "Justify arming Israel"; "Claim good treatment" of Palestinians; "Legalism", arguing that "Israel's attacks don't fit the legal definition of genocide"; "Blame the victims"; and "Peace trumps justice".

=== Downplaying the scale or scope of victims ===
Israeli officials have pursued the core tactic of genocide denial of minimizing the scale of casualties, by casting doubt on official death counts. According to Davide Mastracci, opinions editor of the left-wing Canadian publication The Maple, this mirrors long-established strategies used in Holocaust denial. Denialists criticize the credibility of statistics issued by Gaza Health Ministry (despite their corroboration by independent sources), and according to Mastracci exclude deaths caused by starvation or disease (despite Israeli actions contributing to these conditions), and exploit gaps in data collection that stem from the destruction of hospitals and communication networks.

In 2024, French historian Jean-Pierre Filiu wrote in Le Monde:

The ban on all international press access to the Gaza Strip facilitates campaigns to defame Palestinian sources, to relativize or even contest the terrible human toll of Israeli strikes. This includes a mythical 'Pallywood'... being accused of staging the funerals of bombing victims in Gaza and even of providing plastic infants to extras paid to mourn children they never even had. The parallel is striking with the lies spread by the Kremlin when Russia struck a maternity hospital in March 2022 in the besieged Ukrainian port of Mariupol.

Northwestern University media scholar Marc Owen Jones, writing in Third World Quarterly, states that Pallywood, which he defines as "a derogatory term suggesting that Palestinians stage scenes of suffering for propaganda purposes", has been "a recurring theme in disinformation campaigns against Gaza", and that "As Israel's killing of thousands of Palestinian children and babies became harder to hide, high-profile Israeli accounts and media outlets claimed that Palestinians were fabricating casualty numbers and staging the killing of babies." While the proliferation of digital documentation makes atrocities harder to deny, Ron Dudai writes that all evidence is summarily dismissed as fake news.

=== Accusations of antisemitism ===
Shaw has noted that politicians and media can label criticism of Israeli state actions as antisemitic to avoid describing these actions as genocide and that in Germany "anti-antisemitism" is used to block recognition of the genocide. Psychologists Putra, Shadiqi and Figueiredo argue that the definition of antisemitism has broadened in recent years; they say this expansion allows Israeli officials and supporters to "control the interpretation of who is labeled antisemitic". The claim that antisemitism motivates genocide allegations is further complicated by the fact that various Jewish organizations, scholars, activists, and even Holocaust survivors have themselves described Israeli conduct as genocidal. According to McDoom, accusations of antisemitism are logically flawed because "it is not the Jewish people who stand accused; it is only the state of Israel". Anthropologist Didier Fassin states that "the confusion between the criticism of Israeli policies and antisemitism... allows for the discrediting of any opposition to the current repression in Gaza". McDoom argues that "Invoking antisemitism to deflect legal scrutiny of state violence risks instrumentalizing a serious form of hatred in ways that could weaken its meaning and hinder the global fight against real antisemitism."

=== Moral inversion ===
Variations of this argument include contending that all or most Palestinians support Hamas, are terrorists or equivalent to Nazis. Even if this were true, Moshman says, it would have no bearing on the legal classification of Israel's actions as genocide.

=== Distorting international humanitarian law ===
Some legal scholars have argued that Israel has used permissive interpretations of international humanitarian law to justify its actions. For example, three write that "an array of IHL concepts like safe zones, evacuations, human shields, and 'hospital shields' have been mobilized by Israel as technologies of settler-colonial displacement and genocide, creating conditions of life leading to the destruction of Gaza's Palestinians 'in whole or in part.'" At an extreme, deniers have rejected that Israel has committed any war crimes whatsoever.

=== Word choice ===
University of Exeter Islamic studies lecturer M. R. Baig identifies a trend in Western media to downplay or "provide cover" for the genocide in Gaza, often using language like "conflict", "operation" or "legitimate self-defense". Educational psychologist David Moshman writes that "Referring to the Gaza genocide as a war is a journalistic contribution to genocide denial."

== Analysis ==
According to Moshman, Israel's denial efforts include attempting to suppress news of its actions, for example refusing access to foreign journalists, killing Palestinian journalists and issuing false accounts of its actions, as with the Rafah paramedic massacre.

Legal scholar Sonia Boulos notes that many "liberal elites" who are not "the usual supporters of Israel" have denied the genocide. She argues these liberals tend to acknowledge violations of international law but minimize them by rejecting the term "genocide" to describe them and denying links between the Gaza genocide and the Nakba, in an effort to reduce the impetus for systemic change. She also criticizes responses to the Gaza genocide that center on the emotional distress of Israeli observers rather than Palestinians who are experiencing the genocide. McDoom writes that denial is not "merely after-the-fact justification but a constitutive part of violence itself". An alternative to denial is approval and justification of atrocities, which is widely accepted by Israelis according to polls. Historian Taner Akçam compares Gaza genocide denial to Armenian genocide denial:

If we strip away the exceptionalist vocabulary and normalize our field, what lies before us is something remarkably familiar: a textbook case of denialism. For those working on the Armenian Genocide, the rhetorical playbook surrounding Gaza feels like déjà vu. The language currently used by denialists of the mass atrocities in Gaza – fear of annihilation, appeals to self-defense, and the inversion of victimhood – has been rehearsed for over a century in Turkish denialism. The logic is familiar: violence is always framed as a response, never as an initiative. And whatever happened is explained solely by the victims' own behaviour.

Some scholars have argued that the United States government's response to the Gaza genocide is part of a decades-long pattern where it "denied, downplayed and rationalized atrocities by its allies". Enzo Traverso writes that Germany's memory culture, in which the uniqueness of the Holocaust is taken for granted, leads to denial of Israel's responsibility for the destruction of Gaza. Following the UK government's denial that Israel is committing genocide in Gaza, Amnesty International issued a statement that the UK had misinterpreted the ICJ judgement on Gaza. According to legal scholars Tom Dannenbaum and Janina Dill, the UK government frames its supposed lack of obligation to prevent genocide in Gaza based on this misinterpretation of the ICJ judgement.

Some of the denial arguments contradict each other, with scholar David Moshman quoting Israeli minister Amichai Eliyahu as claiming in the same interview that the famine in Gaza was staged, and that hunger would disappear if Palestinians got rid of the Hamas government. According to Israeli sociologist Ron Dudai, the predominant attitude in Israeli society in regard to the Gaza Strip famine and other atrocities is, "It's all fake – and they deserve it." Critical criminologists Rene van Swaaningen, Bas van Stokkom, and Hans Nelen write that "More than any other country, [Israel] can get away with the most appalling acts and claim to be the victim rather than the perpetrator." While they argue that denial has been replaced by acceptance of the genocide as a fait accompli, they also state that due to publicized brutality Israel is hemorrhaging support from former close allies and attracting boycotts similar to those endured by the South African apartheid regime.

== Accusations of Gaza genocide denial ==
In Australia, Senator David Shoebridge accused the Liberal–National Coalition of "being in denial" for their refusal to acknowledge the determination of genocide in the September 2025 report of the UN Independent International Commission of Inquiry on the Occupied Palestinian Territory.

On December 9, 2025, the Lemkin Institute for Genocide Prevention criticized Hillary Clinton denying the Gaza genocide in her remarks at the December 2 Israel Hayom summit, in which she claimed that videos on TikTok showing Israeli violence in Gaza were "totally made up" and "pure propaganda". In a January 13, 2026 statement, the Lemkin Institute criticized the German government and media of downplaying and denying the Gaza genocide.

In February 2026, Michael Gove, a member of the House of Lords since 2025, was criticized by leader of the Green Party of England and Wales Zack Polanski for denying the Gaza genocide after Gove stated on X: "It's *not* a genocide. Rwanda was a genocide. The Shoah was a genocide. Equating Israel with the Interahamwe or SS is just wicked."

In July 2026, British musician Boy George released a song titled, "We Will Dance Again", with the opening lyrics that stated: "You say genocide, I say war / When you're attacked, that's what the army's for / Does it get ugly? You bet it does / When I know you wanna kill every last one of us." The song also condemned the pro-Palestine movement, with the lyrics saying: "You condemn the Jews, with selective memory / Musicians holding flags, mouthing like sheep / Propaganda fuelled by the internet feels so weak." The song was criticized by social media users for denying the Gaza genocide, with Martyn Ware, musician and founder of The Human League, describing the song as "an overtly pro-genocide, anti-Palestinian piece of musical propaganda".

== See also ==
- 21st century genocides
- Do you condemn Hamas?
- Gaza genocide recognition
- Genocide of indigenous peoples
- Palestinian genocide allegations
- Nakba denial
