= Ryan McMahon (comedian) =

First Nations comedian (born 1977)

- Born: 1977 (age 48–49)
- Citizenship: Couchiching First Nation and Canadian
- Notable work: Thunder Bay (podcast)
- Partner: Madeline Wilson Shaw

Comedy career
- Years active: 2006–present
- Medium: Podcast, stand-up, television
- Website: redmanlaughing.com

Ryan McMahon is an Anishinaabe comedian, podcaster, and writer from the Couchiching First Nation. McMahon was born in Fort Frances, Ontario, the oldest of four siblings. McMahon was the first in his family to graduate from high school. He graduated from the Second City Training Center.

== Career ==
In May 2010, his live performance of Welcome To Turtle Island Too was filmed in St. Albert, Alberta for a CBC television comedy special and he was included in the New Faces of the Just For Laughs festival in Montreal. In February 2015, CBC Radio 1 national aired an hour-long comedy special of Red Man Laughing.

McMahon was also featured in Indigenous filmmaker's Michelle St. John's Colonization Road. St. John won the Yorkton Film Festival's Golden Sheaf Award for Best Documentary – Historical/Biography, and was nominated for a 2018 Canadian Screen Award.

On May 26, 2017, McMahon hosted "12 Steps to Decolonizing Canada" on CBC Radio's Day 6 program. The show received the Sam Ross award for Opinion and Commentary at the 2018 RTDNA awards.

== Podcasts ==
McMahon began podcasting in 2008.

McMahon created the podcast Stories from the Land. In 2016 he co-hosted Canadaland's political show, The Commons.

In 2018 McMahon hosted a podcast called Thunder Bay for Canadaland. The series was largely informed by Toronto Star reporter Tanya Talaga's award-winning book Seven Fallen Feathers: Racism, Death and Hard Truths in a Northern City, which investigated the deaths of seven Indigenous youth in Thunder Bay, Ontario and news reports by APTN. The podcast was adapted into a four-part docu-series also titled Thunder Bay. The series premiered on CRAVE on Februaruy 12, 2023. McMahon served as executive producer, co-writer, host. and directed two of the four episodes of the series. At the 2024 Canadian Screen Awards the series won Best Factual Series with McMahon as producer alongside Jesse Brown, Jocelyn Hamilton and Toby Dormer. McMahon also won for Best Writing, Factual, which he shared with co-writer Michael Allcock for the episode "Whodunit".

McMahon narrated "Home on Native Land", a virtual class on environmental justice issues, Canadian history, and Indigenous law created by (RAVEN) Respecting Aboriginal Values & Environmental Needs.

== Writing ==
McMahon has occasionally freelanced op-eds to Vice News and The Globe and Mail.
