= Arshy Mann =

Canadian journalist and podcaster

Arshy Mann is a Canadian journalist who previously presented the Commons podcast for Canadaland.

== Career ==
In 2013, Mann was the national bureau chief and unofficial historian for the Canadian University Press. He has written for Macleans, the Canadian Broadcasting Corporation, Law Times, MoneySense, The Ubyssey, and Canadian Lawyer InHouse.

While working as an intern at The Toronto Star, in 2013 Mann helped identify the house where Rob Ford was photographed smoking crack cocaine.

In 2017, Mann reported on the disappearances of gay men from Toronto's gay enclave. Mann was critical of Toronto police's approach to the case and their focus on dating apps.

While working at Daily Xtra Mann researched and reported on incel culture and has warned of the increasing extremism and anti-feminism in the culture. Mann has warned of online communities of incels are radicalizing each other and drawn comparisons with how terrorists organize. While at Daily Xtra, Mann criticized the Canadian government for its treatment of LGBTQ refugees from Iran.

He worked for Canadaland producing podcasts, especially the show Commons that he hosted. He left Canadaland to produce a podcast called the Hatchet.
