= Gaza genocide recognition =

Current positions of national governments on whether Israel is committing genocide in the Gaza war Agree Disagree Unclear Defer to the International Court of Justice's ruling in the Gaza genocide case No data

Since October 2023, the government of Israel has been accused of committing genocide against the Palestinian population of the Gaza Strip by several states across the world. The government of South Africa formally accused the country of genocide in December that year in a case before the International Court of Justice, with 14 countries joining the case by December the next year. Explicit state positions on the genocide include recognition, denial, or deferral to the ultimate result of the pending case. Acts of genocide recognition in particular include acknowledgement of genocide in the adoption of laws, parliamentary resolutions, and official speeches.

== National governments ==
=== Legislatures ===
Country	Recognition of genocide	Statement(s)	References
Ireland	Yes	On 7 November 2024, the Dáil Éireann passed a non-binding motion stating that "genocide is being perpetrated before our eyes by Israel in Gaza".	
Turkey	Yes	In August 2024, the Grand National Assembly passed a motion demanding Israeli officials be held to account for genocide.	

=== Executive officials of current governments ===
Country	Recognition of genocide	Statement(s)	References
Afghanistan	Yes	The Ministry of Foreign Affairs of the Taliban condemned Israel's actions as genocide in October 2023.	
Algeria	Yes	President Abdelmadjid Tebboune asked in November 2023: "[W]here is the global conscience that has become absent regarding the genocide being committed?"	(Note: Foreign minister of the relevant country subscribed to a joint statement of 31 Arab and Islamic countries issued by Qatar in August 2025, which "reiterate[d] their rejection and condemnation of the crimes of Israeli aggression, genocide, and ethnic cleansing".)
Angola	Yes	In his address to the 79th Session of the UN General Assembly on 24 September 2024, President João Lourenço called on Israel to do "everything it can to prevent the genocide that the world is witnessing live in the Gaza Strip."; In his address to the 80th Session of the Assembly in September 2025, Lourenço condemned the decision of the United States to deny visas to Mahmoud Abbas, the President of the Palestinian National Authority, and his delegation ahead of the session, stating that the decision "encourages the continuation of the genocide to which we all bear witness." Lourenço further commented that Israel "cannot be allowed to pursue in Palestine – and particularly in Gaza – a policy of extermination of a people."	
Antigua and Barbuda	Yes	Prime Minister Gaston Browne stated in September 2025 that "we condemn the forced removal of people in Gaza from their homeland and the genocide that has occurred there".	
Australia	Awaiting ICJ verdict	Australian Foreign Minister Penny Wong said that "Israel will be judged in the international courts" and that "the position we've always taken as a country is that questions relating to genocide are matters where we respect the independence of international courts and tribunals and their role in upholding international law".	
Austria	Awaiting ICJ verdict	Foreign minister Beate Meinl-Reisinger said in July 2025 that she "think[s] one should be very careful with the term 'genocide' and it will ultimately be the [International Court of Justice] that has to judge it".	
Bahrain	Yes	—N/a	
Bangladesh	Yes	In a statement in April 2025, the Ministry of Foreign Affairs strongly condemned the Israeli bombardments on Gaza Strip for "ethnic cleansing" of Palestinians and urged the international community to take immediate and effective step to implement an unconditional ceasefire, protect the lives of civilians, and deliver humanitarian aid; it also affirmed its support for Palestinian self-determination and the establishment of an independent Palestinian state on the basis of the pre-1967 borders with East Jerusalem as its capital.	
Barbados	Yes	In her address to the UN General Assembly in September 2025, Prime Minister Mia Mottley drew attention to "[t]he genocidal destruction taking place in Gaza."	
Belarus	Yes	In a June 2026 interview, president Alexander Lukashenko stated that Gaza had been "wiped off the face of the earth" and referred to the war there as a "Holocaust". He further criticized what he described as plans to build a resort in Gaza in the aftermath of the war.	
Belgium	Awaiting ICJ verdict	Belgium has vowed to support the verdict of the ICJ in South Africa v. Israel. Foreign Minister Maxime Prévot said, "As the foreign minister, it is not up to me to make such statements. But my personal opinion is that this is very close to genocide. I don't know what other horrors have yet to occur before that word can be used." Prime Minister Bart De Wever said that the claim of genocide was "something for the International Court of Justice to determine". On 23 December 2025, the ICJ announced that Belgium had joined South Africa's case against Israel at the court.	
Belize	Yes	On 22 October 2023, Prime Minister Johnny Briceño accused the Israeli government of "committing genocide against the Palestinian people." On 31 January 2025, Belize submitted a request to join South Africa's genocide case against Israel at the ICJ.	
Bolivia	Yes	On 8 October 2024, Bolivia submitted a request to join South Africa's genocide case against Israel at the ICJ, and did so on 9 October.	
Bosnia and Herzegovina	Yes	In a meeting in September 2025 with Chaloka Beyani, Special Advisor to the UN Secretary-General for the Prevention of Genocide, Chairman of the Presidency of Bosnia and Herzegovina Željko Komšić commented that, although many believed the crime of genocide would never be committed again after the Holocaust, "genocide was committed in Bosnia and Herzegovina and, unfortunately, today we are witnessing its repetition in Gaza." In his address to the UN General Assembly on 24 September 2025, Komšić further condemned the genocide of the Palestinian people and the inaction of the international community in face of it.	
Brazil	Yes	President Luiz Inácio Lula da Silva condemned Israel's actions as genocide, saying: "What's happening in the Gaza Strip with the Palestinian people hasn't happened at any other moment in history. Actually, it has happened: when Hitler decided to kill the Jews." In June 2025, he accused Israel of carrying out "premediated genocide" in Gaza. On 14 July 2025, it was announced that Brazil would join South Africa's genocide case against Israel at the ICJ.	
Brunei	Yes	In a joint statement with Malaysian Prime Minister Anwar Ibrahim in August 2024, Sultan Hassanal Bolkiah condemned "the ongoing genocide and aggression in the Gaza Strip" by Israel. Minister of Foreign Affairs II Erywan Yusof said in September 2025 that, although humanity vowed to say "never again to genocide" in the aftermath of World War II and the Holocaust, Israel's warfare on Gaza consists of "actions that betray that vow."	
Canada	Awaiting ICJ verdict	In April 2025, prime minister Mark Carney seemingly agreed with a protester who said there was "a genocide happening in Palestine", but later said he had misheard the question. In September 2025 foreign minister Anita Anand noted that the matter was being investigated by the ICJ; UN ambassador David Lametti said Canada would need "all the evidence to come in" and be assessed before deciding on the matter.	
Chad	Yes	—N/a	
Chile	Yes	On 12 October 2024, Chile submitted a request to join South Africa's genocide case against Israel at the ICJ.	
China	Yes	The Chinese government made no mention of genocide in its official response to the ICJ's interim ruling in January 2024, but by August 2025, the State Council Information Office's "Report on Human Rights Violations in the United States in 2024" accused Israel of committing genocide in Gaza with the complicity of the United States.	
Colombia	No	On 18 September 2026, the government of President Abelardo de la Espriella formally notified the ICJ of Colombia's withdrawal from South Africa's genocide case against Israel.	
Comoros	Yes	In his address to the 80th Session of the UN General Assembly on 24 September 2025, President Azali Assoumani described the Israeli response to the October 7 attacks as "amount[ing] to a genocide", which he acknowledged was "rightly described" by experts.	
Costa Rica	No	In July 2026, foreign minister Manuel Tovar stated his government did not consider Israel's actions in the Gaza Strip to constitute genocide.	
Cuba	Yes	On 11 January 2024 the Cuban Ministry of Foreign Affairs expressed support for South Africa's genocide case against Israel at the ICJ, and on 31 March 2024, president Miguel Diaz-Canel stated that "Cuba demands that the genocide stop now." On 22 June 2024, Cuba announced it would join South Africa's case at the ICJ.	
Denmark	Awaiting ICJ verdict	Foreign minister Lars Løkke Rasmussen refrained from accusing Israel of genocide in Gaza following the release of the UNHRC Commission of Inquiry report in September 2025, saying that it was a matter for courts to decide.	
Djibouti	Yes	President Ismaïl Omar Guelleh said that Palestinians were being subjected to genocide during the war in November 2023.	
Egypt	Yes	Egypt registered to formally support South Africa's case, following Israel's seizure of the Rafah Border Crossing. In August 2025, President Abdel Fattah el-Sisi accused Israel of carrying out a "systematic genocide" in Gaza.	
Finland	Awaiting ICJ verdict	In an interview in May 2025, Foreign Minister Elina Valtonen conceded that Israel's actions in Gaza couldn't be anything other than genocide. When asked why the Finnish government doesn't say so officially, Valtonen responded that they would leave the final judgments to the ICJ.	
France	Awaiting ICJ verdict	In an interview in July 2025, Foreign Minister Jean-Noël Barrot responded to a question on France's position on whether a genocide is happening in Gaza by stating that the government "has no position to take on the legal description of the facts," and that it is "up to the international courts" to do so.	
The Gambia	Yes	—N/a	
Germany	No	In September 2025, Chancellor Friedrich Merz said that, while he does not view Israel's actions in Gaza as proportionate to their stated goals, neither does he view those actions as amounting to genocide. Furthermore, Germany has rejected the genocide charges brought against Israel by South Africa at the ICJ.	
Ghana	Yes	In a televised interview in September 2025, Foreign Minister Samuel Okudzeto Ablakwa commented that his government agrees with the findings of the UNHRC Commission of Inquiry that Israel is committing genocide in the Gaza Strip.	
Greece	No	In an interview on 17 September 2025, Prime Minister Kyriakos Mitsotakis said that a major humanitarian disaster is unfolding in Gaza, but he considers the term "genocide" to be heavy.	
Guyana	Yes	President Irfaan Ali described Israel's actions as "nothing short of genocide" in April 2024.	
Holy See	Unclear	Pope Leo XIV said in July 2025 that "[o]fficially, the Holy See does not believe that we can make any declaration at this time" about whether a genocide is being perpetrated in Gaza, but acknowledged that "more and more people are raising the issue".	
Iceland	Awaiting ICJ verdict	Minister of Foreign Affairs Þorgerður Katrín Gunnarsdóttir stated in September 2025 that the Icelandic government was considering joining South Africa's case against Israel at the ICJ, and that a decision would come in October of that year. Concerning the situation in Gaza, she said her view was that "there is clearly ethnic cleansing taking place" and that "this bears all the hallmarks of genocide," but that ultimately "it is for the International Court of Justice to decide this."	
Indonesia	Yes	In a statement from August 2025, Foreign Minister Sugiono emphasized that Indonesia "firmly rejects the genocide of the Palestinian people by Zionist Israel".	
Iran	Yes	Addressing the UN General Assembly in September 2025, President Masoud Pezeshkian accused Israel of destabilizing the region and committing genocide in Gaza.	
Iraq	Yes	On 8 May 2024, Prime Minister Mohammed Shia' Al Sudani said that Israel's war in Gaza is tantamount to genocide.	
Ireland	Yes	On 11 December, Ireland announced that it was joining South Africa's genocide case against Israel at the ICJ; a request to join the case was submitted on 6 January 2025. During a debate in the Dáil Éireann in May 2025, Tánaiste and Foreign Minister Simon Harris spoke of "the genocidal activity of the Netanyahu government" in Gaza. In his address to the United Nations General Assembly on 26 September 2025, Taoiseach Micheál Martin urged those providing means necessary for Israel to continue its war to "reflect carefully on the implications of their actions and the consequences for the Palestinian people," adding that "[t]here cannot be business as usual in the face of genocide."	
Israel	No	Prime Minister Benjamin Netanyahu and his government both rejected the charge of genocide, with their position being that they have acted in accordance with international law.	
Italy	No	In an interview on 11 January 2024, Foreign Minister Antonio Tajani said that, while Israel has targeted civilians during the war in Gaza, "genocide is something else".	
Jordan	Yes	Foreign Minister Ayman Safadi said in January 2024 that Israel's actions met the legal definition of genocide.	
Kuwait	Yes	—N/a	
Kyrgyzstan	Yes	On 18 March 2024, Deputy Prime Minister Edil Baisalov called on Israel and the U.S. to stop the "madness and the genocide" in Gaza.	
Lebanon	Yes	—N/a	
Libya	Yes	In May 2024, Libya filed a declaration of intervention in South Africa's genocide case against Israel as it believes that Israel is committing genocide.	
Luxembourg	Awaiting ICJ verdict	In January 2024, Foreign Minister Xavier Bettel rejected calls from members of the Chamber of Deputies to evaluate supporting South Africa's case against Israel at the ICJ, saying the country would remain neutral and wait for the results of the proceedings in the case.	
Malaysia	Yes	In an interview in May 2024, Prime Minister Anwar Ibrahim condemned Israel's actions as genocide and accused the United States of being complicit.	
Maldives	Yes	On 24 September 2024, President Mohamed Muizzu said before the UN General Assembly that "the genocide by Israel in Gaza is a travesty of justice and the international system".	
Malta	Unclear	In January 2024, Prime Minister Robert Abela refrained from stating whether the Maltese government considers Israel's warfare in Gaza to be genocide, but said: "You have more than 20,000 innocent people who lost their lives. I will leave it up to people to arrive at that conclusion on whether this is genocide."	
Mauritania	Yes	At the Arab–Islamic extraordinary summit in November 2023, President Mohamed Ould Ghazouani accused Israel of "carrying out genocide in front of the world".	
Mexico	Yes	On 22 September 2025, President Claudia Sheinbaum referred to Israel's action in Gaza as genocide during a press conference about the country's recognition of the State of Palestine.	
Morocco	Yes	—N/a	
Namibia	Yes	In January 2024, President Hage Geingob called Israel's actions in Gaza "genocidal and gruesome" and sharply criticised Germany's decision to back Israel in South Africa v. Israel, saying that Germany had an "inability to draw lessons from its horrific history", including the Herero and Nama genocide during German colonial rule in Namibia. His successor Netumbo Nandi-Ndaitwah reiterated his stance whilst addressing the UN General Assembly on 24 September 2025, stating that, "indeed, a genocide is being committed against the Palestinian people."	
Netherlands	Awaiting ICJ verdict	In September 2025, Dutch Foreign Minister David van Weel said that the Netherlands would not follow the UNHRC Commission of Inquiry report released the same month that accused Israel of committing genocide in the Gaza Strip, and would instead wait for the ICJ's decision in South Africa v. Israel.	
New Zealand	Awaiting ICJ verdict	Reacting to the UNHRC Commission of Inquiry's findings that Israel had committed genocide in the Gaza Strip, Foreign Minister Winston Peters stated in September 2025 that the government was "interested in what the international courts might say, and that's what we would wait for". The same stance was reiterated by Prime Minister Christopher Luxon and Deputy Prime Minister David Seymour.	
Nicaragua	Yes	Nicaragua has condemned Israel's accusations as genocide and accused Germany of complicity by exchanging weapons to Israel. In October 2024, Nicaragua severed diplomatic ties with Israel after its invasion of Lebanon, calling the Israeli government "fascist" and "genocidal", and Prime Minister Benjamin Netanyahu "the son of the Devil". On 8 February 2024, Nicaragua submitted a request to join the ICJ's case against Israel at the ICJ, but withdrew the request on 3 April 2025.	
Niger	Yes	In an address to the UN General Assembly in September 2025, Prime Minister Ali Lamine Zeine said that "the Nigerien people unreservedly condemn the Israeli genocide in Gaza and give their strongest support to the creation of a sovereign Palestinian state."	
Nigeria	Yes	—N/a	
North Korea	Yes	A Foreign Ministry spokesman said a bombing of a hospital during the war in October 2023 "show[ed] that the U.S. is an accomplice who connived at and fostered Israel's genocide".	
Norway	Awaiting ICJ verdict	On 2 September 2024, Foreign Minister Espen Barth Eide said, "We welcome the use of the ICJ, but leave to the court to assess whether the accusation of genocide is correct."	
Oman	Yes	The Foreign Ministry condemned Israel's actions as genocide in May 2024.	
Pakistan	Yes	Prime Minister Shehbaz Sharif said in September 2025 that "Israel's genocidal onslaught [in Gaza] has unleashed unspeakable terror upon women and children in a manner we have not witnessed in decades, perhaps ever".	
Palestine	Yes	Palestinian Ambassador to the United Nations Riyad Mansour said Israel's bombardment and siege of Gaza were "nothing less than genocidal" in a letter sent on 10 October 2023. Two days later, senior Hamas official Ghazi Hamad also made the accusation. President Mahmoud Abbas condemned Israel's actions as genocide in November 2023.	
Paraguay	No	In a statement on 10 January 2024, the Ministry of Foreign Affairs rejected the accusations of genocide presented against Israel at the ICJ.	
Poland	No	In October 2024, Polish chargé d'affaires (later ambassador) to Israel Maciej Hunia rejected the accusation of genocide against Israel, saying he was "absolutely sure" the Israeli army was not planning operations to kill innocent people, and explaining the civilian deaths in Gaza as "collateral damage." In an interview with Polskie Radio in September 2025, Foreign Minister Radosław Sikorski echoed a similar stance, stating that while he viewed the "catastrophic number" of civilian deaths in Gaza as a "terrible tragedy," it did not in his view meet the definition of genocide.	
Portugal	No	In an interview with El País in May 2024, Foreign Minister Paulo Rangel rejected the genocide accusation, saying it would be "very unfair" to say Israel intends to eliminate the Palestinian people, while maintaining that "there is a humanitarian catastrophe [in Gaza] that demands condemnation" and calling for a ceasefire.	
Qatar	Yes	The Ministry of Foreign Affairs called on the UN Security Council in February 2024 "to take urgent action to prevent the Israeli occupation forces from storming Rafah and committing genocide" there. Qatari emir Tamim bin Hamad Al Thani said in September 2024 that Israel had committed "a crime of genocide".	
Russia	Unclear	Responding to a question on Russia's stance regarding South Africa v. Israel in January 2024, Foreign Minister Sergey Lavrov stated the Russian government would "wait and see" which position it would take. In an interview in October 2025, Lavrov acknowledged that "[w]e hear officials from many European capitals and international organisations say words like 'genocide' and 'famine'" regarding the situation in Gaza. However, Lavrov did not mention whether the Russian government agrees with such descriptions.	
Sahrawi Republic	Yes	The Sahrawi government welcomed an ICJ ruling on South Africa v. Israel on 27 January 2024, describing the ruling as "a decisive victory for international law". On 12 October 2025, President Brahim Ghali stated that Morocco "does not hesitate to ally itself [...] with perpetrators of crimes against humanity and genocide, such as the occupying Zionist entity".	
Saint Lucia	Yes	Minister of External Affairs Alva Baptiste condemned "the undeniable genocide that is being committed against the people of Palestine, especially in Gaza" during a speech to the United Nations General Assembly in September 2025.	
Saint Vincent and the Grenadines	Yes	On 11 January 2024, the Prime Minister's office released a statement of support for South Africa's case against Israel at the ICJ, calling on the court to adopt provisional measures to "prevent any further acts of genocide against the Palestinian people". The statement also called on other countries to stop providing material support to Israel, accusing those who continue to do so of being "complicit in genocide before our very eyes".	
Saudi Arabia	Yes	The Ministry of Foreign Affairs condemned the "continued genocidal massacres against the Palestinian people at the hands of the Israeli war machine" in July 2024.	
Senegal	Yes	In June 2024, Prime Minister Ousmane Sonko condemned Israel's actions as genocide and accused other countries of complicity.	
Sierra Leone	Yes	In his address to the 80th Session of the UN General Assembly on 24 September 2025, President Julius Maada Bio criticized the "paralysis" of the UN Security Council in face of the human suffering in Gaza, stating that "[a] preventable genocide was not prevented."	
Singapore	Awaiting ICJ verdict	In a statement published on 22 September 2025, Minister of Foreign Affairs Vivian Balakrishnan and Senior Minister of State for Foreign Affairs Sim Ann noted the report of the UNHRC Commission of Inquiry concluding that Israel is committing genocide in Gaza. The ministers acknowledged that the matter was being investigated by the ICJ, which they referred to as "the appropriate forum to adjudicate such grave concerns."	
Slovenia	Yes	In an address to the European Parliament on 21 May 2025, President Nataša Pirc Musar said: "We are witnessing genocide in the West Bank. We are looking and keeping quiet." She later clarified that she meant Gaza, not the West Bank.	
Somalia	Yes	The Ministry of Foreign Affairs urged "swift action to halt [the] Gaza genocide by Israel" in January 2024.	
South Africa	Yes	The government of South Africa first accused Israel of genocide in November 2023, recalling its ambassador from Tel Aviv and condemning the Israeli ambassador for what Minister in the Presidency Khumbudzo Ntshavheni described as "disparaging remarks [...] about those who are opposing the atrocities and genocide of the Israeli government." South Africa formally brought a case before the International Court of Justice accusing the Israeli government of genocide in Gaza in December 2023.	
Spain	Yes	In May 2025, Prime Minister Pedro Sánchez called Israel a "genocidal state." Several government ministers have also publicly called Israel's warfare in Gaza genocide, including Second Deputy Prime Minister Yolanda Díaz, Defence Minister Margarita Robles, Youth Minister Sira Rego, and former Social Affairs Minister Ione Belarra. Foreign Minister José Manuel Albares previously said, "Whether this is genocide or not, that is for the [World] court to decide, and Spain of course will support its decision." On 6 June 2024, Spain submitted a request for joining South Africa's genocide case against Israel at the ICJ.	
Sudan	Yes	—N/a	
Sweden	Awaiting ICJ verdict	Reacting to a resolution by the International Association of Genocide Scholars concluding that Israel is committing genocide in Gaza, Foreign Minister Maria Malmer Stenergard commented in September 2025 that, while the information in the resolution is "very serious," the Swedish government would "await the assessments from an international court before we establish that it is a matter of genocide."	
Syria	Yes	—N/a	
Timor-Leste	Yes	Foreign Minister Bendito Freitas urged the international community in September 2025 to "waste no more time on terminology" regarding "the situation of famine and genocide" in Gaza.	
Tunisia	Yes	According to Wafa, the Ministry of Foreign Affairs demanded an end to Israel's "war of genocide" in May 2024.	
Turkey	Yes	President Recep Tayyip Erdoğan condemned Israel's actions as "amounting to genocide" in October 2023. On 9 February 2024, Foreign Minister Hakan Fidan said that the international community's silence on Israel's actions in Gaza were "complicity in genocide". On 7 August 2024, Turkey submitted a request to join South Africa's genocide case against Israel at the ICJ.	
United Arab Emirates	Yes	—N/a	
United Kingdom	Awaiting ICJ verdict	In a statement to the House of Commons in September 2026, foreign secretary Ed Miliband stopped short of describing Israel's warfare in Gaza as genocide, saying the UK would await the decision reached by the international courts on the matter.	
United States	No	The second Trump administration filed to intervene in South Africa's genocide case against Israel, saying, "the United States affirms, in the strongest terms possible, that the allegations of “genocide” against Israel are false."	
Uruguay	Yes	A resolution adopted by the governing Broad Front coalition in June 2025 condemned the "ethnic cleansing and genocide" committed by Israel in Gaza. Foreign Minister Mario Lubetkin maintained that he views the resolution "positively", but refrained from stating whether the government considers the situation in Gaza a genocide or not; President Yamandú Orsi took a similar position. The government clarified its position after further calls by the Broad Front to condemn Israel's actions in Gaza, with Vice President Carolina Cosse affirming that genocide is being committed in October 2025.	
Yemen	Yes	In October 2023, the Ministry of Foreign Affairs of the UN-recognized Aden-based government condemned "the war crimes and genocide" committed by Israel in Gaza. In the aftermath of the Al-Ahli Arab Hospital explosion the same month, a spokesperson for the rival Sanaa-based Houthi government called Israeli actions in Gaza "genocide with American-Western cover", adding that "[t]here is no room for leaving the people of Gaza vulnerable to genocide, and all Islamic countries are responsible for effective and deterrent action."	
Zimbabwe	Yes	In January 2024 Christopher Mutsvangwa, spokesperson of the ruling ZANU–PF party and then-Minister of Veterans of the Liberation Struggle Affairs, said the Palestinians were imperilled by the "genocidal practices and tendencies" of the Israeli government, and hailed the South African government for bringing a case against Israel before the ICJ.	

=== Executive officials of former governments ===
Former executive official or government	Country	Recognition of genocide	Statement(s)	References
Kakar caretaker government	Pakistan	Yes	Foreign Minister Jalil Abbas Jilani condemned Israel's airstrikes on Gaza and siege of the territory as genocide in October 2023	
Sunak ministry	United Kingdom	No	The Foreign Office dismissed the accusation of genocide against Israel in January 2024.	
Raisi government	Iran	Yes	Foreign Minister Hossein Amir-Abdollahian condemned Israel's actions as genocide in October 2023. During a meeting with Russian President Vladimir Putin in December 2023, President Ebrahim Raisi described the war in Gaza as "genocide and a crime against humanity" and accused Western countries of supporting Israel's actions.	
Third Ould Bilal government	Mauritania	Yes	The government condemned Israel's actions in October 2023, and called on the international community to "impose an immediate cessation of the genocide to which the Palestinian people are subjected".	
Fifth Hasina ministry	Bangladesh	Yes	The government backed South Africa's genocide case against Israel in January 2024.	
Attal government	France	No	In January 2024, Foreign Minister Stéphane Séjourné said that accusing Israel of genocide is "to cross a moral threshold", casting doubt on whether France would accept the ICJ's verdict in South Africa v. Israel.	
Onward Indonesia Cabinet	Indonesia	Yes	Speaking before the UN General Assembly on 23 September 2024, Foreign Minister Retno Marsudi said that "the ongoing genocide by Israel must be stopped immediately".	
Ba'athist Syria	Syria	Yes	Foreign Minister Faisal Mekdad condemned Israel's actions as genocide in October 2023. During a speech to an Arab–Islamic extraordinary summit in November 2024, President Bashar al-Assad described Israel's actions as "massacres, genocide and ethnic cleansing".	
Biden administration	United States	No	President Joe Biden and his Secretary of State Antony Blinken dismissed the accusation of genocide against Israel, with Blinken calling it "meritless".	
Third Mikati cabinet	Lebanon	Yes	In July 2024, Prime Minister Najib Mikati expressed concern "with the ongoing genocide against the Palestinians, namely in Gaza, based on our Arab identity and national and humanitarian considerations".	
Lacalle administration	Uruguay	No	In February 2024, Foreign Minister Omar Paganini stated the government didn't view the situation in Gaza as a genocide, while expressing hope for a peaceful solution to the conflict.	
29th Canadian Ministry	Canada	Awaiting ICJ verdict	In January 2024, prime minister Justin Trudeau and foreign minister Mélanie Joly released statements neither endorsing nor rejecting South Africa's case against Israel. Shortly thereafter, Joly clarified she would watch the case "very closely", and Global Affairs Canada promised to abide by any decision the court reaches.	
Scholz cabinet	Germany	No	In January 2024 Foreign Minister Annalena Baerbock said that she could not see genocidal intent in "Israel's self-defence against […] Hamas." During a visit to Jerusalem the same month, Vice Chancellor Robert Habeck stated his opinion that, while it is possible to criticize the Israeli army for "acting too harshly" in Gaza, "that does not constitute genocide."	
Pope Francis	Holy See	Unclear	In November 2023, several witnesses to a speech by Pope Francis said that he called Israel's actions a genocide, but a Vatican spokesman denied this. Francis later called for an investigation "to determine whether it fits into the technical definition [of genocide] formulated by jurists and international bodies".	
Arce cabinet	Bolivia	Yes	President Luis Arce tweeted that he agreed with President Lula of Brazil (see above) concerning "the truth about the genocide that is being committed against the brave Palestinian people".	
President Michael D. Higgins	Ireland	Yes	On 16 September 2025, Higgins called for the "exclusion [from the United Nations] of those who are practising genocide, and those who are supporting genocide with armaments".	
Fiala cabinet	Czech Republic	No	In September 2025 Foreign Minister Jan Lipavský rejected the findings of the UNHRC Commission of Inquiry report released the same month, which concluded that Israel is committing genocide in Gaza, as partially "unfounded" and "beyond the pale".	
Maduro administration	Venezuela	Yes	President Nicolás Maduro condemned Israel's actions as genocide in October 2023. After Israeli President Isaac Herzog condemned several Latin American countries, among them Venezuela, for taking a critical stance to the Israeli offensive in Gaza in November 2023, Foreign Minister Yván Gil expressed "repudiation" of Herzog's statement on the positions of the countries in question "in relation to the genocide that his country is implementing on the proud Palestinian people."	
Castro administration	Honduras	Yes	In a speech before the UN General Assembly on 25 September 2024, President Xiomara Castro called for "an end to the genocide in Gaza".	
Supreme Leader Ali Khamenei	Iran	Yes	On 17 October 2023, Khamenei said that "the world is witnessing the Zionist regime's genocide of Palestinians in Gaza" during a ceremony attended by students in Tehran, which was also marked by chants of "death to Israel".	
Boric administration	Chile	Yes	In a speech before the UN General Assembly on 25 September 2024, President Gabriel Boric condemned both Hamas and Israel's actions in Gaza, saying he refuses to choose between "the terrorism of Hamas and the genocide that Israel is carrying out in Palestine".	
Fifth Orbán government	Hungary	No	Foreign minister Péter Szijjártó described the genocide accusation as "nonsense" in January 2024, reiterating his country's support for Israel.	
Starmer ministry	United Kingdom	No	Prime minister Keir Starmer refused to call Israel's actions in Gaza "genocide". A letter written by foreign secretary David Lammy, revealed in September 2025, stated that the government's position was that the war did not meet the criteria to determine it as a genocide.	
Petro administration	Colombia	Yes	President Gustavo Petro commented in November 2023: "It's called genocide, they do it to remove the Palestinian people from Gaza and take it over. The head of the state who carries out this genocide is a criminal against humanity. Their allies cannot talk about democracy." In his address to the UN General Assembly in September 2025, Petro said of US President Donald Trump that "by allowing the launching of missiles against young children, women, and the elderly in Gaza, he makes himself an accomplice in the genocide, because it is genocide, and we must shout it out again and again."	

== See also ==
- Gaza genocide denial
- Academic and legal responses to the Gaza genocide
- Allegations of genocide of Ukrainians in the Russo-Ukrainian war
- Allegations of genocide in the October 7 attacks
- Holodomor genocide question
