= Thunder Bay (podcast) =

2018 podcast by Ryan McMahon/Canadaland

- Genre: True crime, corruption, systemic racism

Creative team
- Created by: Canadaland

Cast and voices
- Hosted by: Ryan McMahon

Publication
- Original release: 2018

Thunder Bay is a 2018 podcast hosted by Ryan McMahon on the Canadaland network. The podcast critiques the government and police responses to systemic racism and violence directed toward Indigenous peoples in the northern Ontario town of Thunder Bay, Ontario, Canada.

== Production ==
The podcast builds on information contained in the 2017 book Seven Fallen Feathers by investigative journalist Tanya Talaga of The Toronto Star. Seven Fallen Feathers documents the unexplained deaths of seven Indigenous youth, all found in rivers close to Thunder Bay. The podcast is presented in five parts, produced by Canadaland, and hosted McMahon, who grew up near Thunder Bay.

The production costs of the show were crowd-funded via Patreon.

== Synopsis ==
The podcast documents systemic racism and corruption in Thunder Bay and the unexplained deaths of young Indigenous people, whose bodies were found in the Kaministiquia and McIntyre Rivers. It documents Thunder Bay Mayor Keith Hobbs' rejection of the Ontario Human Rights Commission concerns about the lack of municipal support for the Indigenous population in the town. It discusses the killing of local Indigenous woman, Barbara Kentner. The local police chief and a former Ontario Crown Prosecutor are also criticised.

== Critical reception ==
Jim Wilson, writing in Canadian Dimension praises McMahon's passion, notes his appropriate anger and how it captivates the listener. The Atlantic listed the podcast as one of the best 50 podcasts of 2018.

A four-part documentary series follow up of the same name was produced by McMahon. Thunder Bay premiered on Crave in February, 2023.
