= O'Reilly on Advertising =

O'Reilly on Advertising (2005) was a popular show that was broadcast Saturday mornings on CBC Radio One, running from 11:30 – 12:00pm (half an hour later in Newfoundland). Its host was Terry O'Reilly, who is a radio/voiceover director with a lengthy career. Its producer and co-creator was fellow adman and broadcaster Mike Tennant. "The program explored the world of advertising in a fun and irreverent way," and is essentially a primer on media literacy, illustrating how advertisers create successful (or unsuccessful, as the case may be) radio ads. It ran for a total of 25 episodes, not including repeats, and concluded airing on December 31, 2005.

Some of the topics covered in the series include branding, the effective use of tag-lines, the Lion Advertising Awards at Cannes, and Public Service messages. It also examined why some advertising campaigns win or fail, how good copywriting can make a difference, and also trends in ad creativity.

The show was produced independently for the CBC by Pirate Radio and Television in Toronto.

O'Reilly and Tennant returned to the airwaves in 2006 with a follow-up series called The Age of Persuasion (2006 to 2011). They decided to "recalibrate the series", taking a longer view, and gave it the new name. The program "explores the countless ways marketers permeate your life, from media, art, and language, to politics, religion, and fashion."

O'Reilly's third radio series is called Under the Influence (2012), now in its 8th season (As of 2019). This new series takes a much wider view, looking at the history, methods, and impacts of "not just advertising – but the expanding world of marketing."

== Episode list ==
1. When Ads Go Too Far
2. So You Want to Be a Voice Actor
3. Celebrities In Advertising
4. A Brief History of Advertising
5. The Science of Advertising
6. David and Goliath Ad Stories
7. Music in Advertising
8. The Sparhawk Beer Story (AKA "From Suits to Nuts")
9. The Five Men Who Invented My Job
10. The Wrath of Cannes
11. Humour in Ads
12. The Art of the PSA
13. In Radio, You Are the Art Director
14. Greatest Beer Ads
15. International Ads – A Look Around The World
16. The Importance of Branding
17. Using Music as a Character
18. Advocacy Ads – Selling an Idea, Not a Product
19. Moments – Moments That Made Commercials Great
20. Campaigns
21. Good Briefs, Bad Briefs, Ugly Briefs
22. The Great Debate – Creative vs Effective
23. Great Writing
24. Fashions in Ad Creative – Trends
25. Desert Island Reel – Terry's Favourite Spots of All Time
