= Kasia Mychajlowycz =

Canadian journalist and podcaster

- Education: University of Toronto, Ryerson University
- Occupation: Podcast producer
- Employer: The Globe & Mail
- Notable work: Cool Mules 2020 podcast

Kasia Mychajlowycz is a journalist and podcaster who hosted Canadaland's Cool Mules 2020 podcast.

== Education ==
Mychajlowycz obtained an MA degree from the School of Journalism at Ryerson University and is a graduate of the University of Toronto School of Journalism. In Winter 2012, Mychajlowycz was the online story editor for Ryerson Review of Journalism.

== Career ==
Mychajlowycz joined Canadaland in May 2019 and worked as a senior producer. In January 2021, Broadcast Dialogue announced that she was moving to The Globe & Mail as a senior podcast producer. Mychajlowycz has previously worked in Canada and the United States in as a producer at MTV, The Atlantic, and at WNYC. She has also worked on the Freakonomics Podcasts.

In 2021, Mychajlowycz won the University of Toronto School of Journalism's Best Podcast: Arts and Culture and two honourable mentions for her work on the Canadaland podcast and The White Saviors podcast. Also in 2021, she won Gold - Best Podcast: Arts & Culture for her work on the Cool Mules podcast and honourable mentions for her work on The White Saviors at the Digital Publishing Awards, a National Media Awards Foundation event. In 2022, she won an honourable mention for her work on the Canadaland podcast at the Digital Publishing Awards.

== Selected publications ==
- Ivor Shapiro, Colette Brin, Isabelle Bédard-Brûlé & Kasia Mychajlowycz (2013) Verification as a Strategic Ritual, Journalism Practice, 7:6, 657-673, DOI: 10.1080/17512786.2013.765638

== Personal life ==
In 2014, Mychajlowycz wrote an open letter to Sinead O'Connor, critiquing her open letter to Miley Cyrus.
