= Exigent Foundation =

The Exigent Foundation is a Canadian non-profit organization founded in 2024 by Larry Maher, Georganne Burke and Vivian Bercovici. The foundation has sponsored at least 8 delegations to Israel by Canadian journalists, elected officials, and members of the Canadian Armed Forces.

== Background ==
Larry Maher is a Toronto businessman, Vivian Bercovici is a Canadian and Israeli dual citizen and is the former Canadian ambassador to Israel, and Georgeanne Burke is a Canadian and American dual citizen and member of the Conservative Party of Canada.

== Sponsored trips ==
In January 2025, the Exigent Foundation sponsored a delegation to Israel that included Canadian member of parliament Kevin Vuong. Vuong subsequently wrote an op-ed in the National Post describing his trip to Israel, and advocating for the elimination of the Lebanese group Hezbollah, which has been designated as a terrorist organisation by Canada.

In January 2026, Canadian news outlet The Maple published an investigation into Canadian journalists who took sponsored trips to Israel, including a list of 27 media figures who travelled as part of an Exigent Foundation delegation. Journalists came from the National Post and Toronto Sun, along with right-wing alternative media outlets Juno News, True North, the Western Standard and The Post Millennial, and pro-Israel pressure group HonestReporting Canada.

In February 2026, PressProgress reported that Israel's Ministry of Foreign Affairs had given the Exigent Foundation CA$175,000 to bring "Canadian influencers and policymakers" to Israel.

== See also ==
- Hasbara
