= The Age of Persuasion =

Canadian radio program

Terry O'Reilly and Mike Tennant talk about The Age of Persuasion on Bookbits radio.

The Age of Persuasion is a Canadian radio series which aired on CBC Radio One for 107 episodes over five seasons between 2006 and 2011, and also broadcast on Chicago public radio station WBEZ. A sequel to the earlier O'Reilly on Advertising, the series is hosted by Terry O'Reilly and explores the sociological and cultural impact of advertising on modern life.

Each episode uses humour and numerous excerpts from historical radio broadcasts and commercials to make its point.

Many episodes are available in streaming MP3 format from the program's CBC website. Some are available in podcast form at the unofficial site CBC Podcasts. On December 24, 2010, the Age of Persuasion blog announced that the CBC would be podcasting the show starting in January 2011.

The show's creators, Terry O'Reilly and Mike Tennant, have released a book: The Age of Persuasion: How Marketing Ate Our Culture, (Knopf Canada & Vintage Paperbacks). The book is published in the United States by Counterpoint Press.

As late as November 2011, O'Reilly had indicated that a sixth season of AoP would begin that January. However, in December 2011, O'Reilly revealed that AoP would in fact be replaced at that time by a new series, Under the Influence, reflecting the shift of marketing from a "one-way conversation" to a "delicate dialogue".

== Episode list ==
Note: Starting in season 2, episodes in italics are repeat broadcasts. Links in the episode title take you to an online copy of the episode. Links in the date take you to a summary only.

=== Season 1 ===
| Ep # | Episode Title | Broadcast Date |
|---|---|---|
| 1x01 | Clutter | 2006-09-07 |
| 1x02 | The Language of Persuasion | 2006-09-14 |
| 1x03 | Rinse and Repeat | 2006-09-21 |
| 1x04 | Yoots - Youth Marketing | 2006-09-28 |
| 1x05 | The Lesson of Clark Gable's Undershirt | 2006-10-05 |
| 1x06 | The Long and Short of It | 2006-10-12 |
| 1x07 | Breaking the Contract | 2006-10-19 |
| 1x08 | The Rise and Fall and Rise of Branded Entertainment | 2006-10-26 |
| 1x09 | The Human Face of Persuasion | 2006-11-02 |
| 1x10 | All the World's a Marketing Opportunity | 2006-11-09 |
| 1x11 | Walk 1.6 Kilometres in My Shoes | 2006-11-16 |
| 1x12 | Strange But True Tales of Market Research | 2006-11-23 |
| 1x13 | Love, Marriage and Sexual Tension | 2006-11-30 |
| 1x14 | Branding a Nation | 2006-12-07 |
| 1x15 | The Persuasive Power of Storytelling | 2007-01-15 |
| 1x16 | Protecting the Celebrity Brand | 2007-01-25 |
| 1x17 | Goin' to the Show: Super Bowl Ads | 2007-02-01 |
| 1x18 | A Sense of Persuasion | 2007-02-08 |
| 1x19 | Leaving Your Mark | 2007-02-15 |
| 1x20 | The YouTube Revolution The trends in media usage by advertisers are examined, from the rise and fall of radio and television advertising, to viral videos and non-media "idea" advertising. | 2007-03-03 |
| 1x21 | By Any Other Name | 2007-03-08 |
| 1x22 | Guerrillas in Our Midst | 2007-03-29 |
| 1x23 | Frontiers and Boundaries | 2007-04-05 |
| 1x24 | Reviving the Brand | 2007-04-12 |
| 1x25 | It's the Insight, Stupid! | 2007-04-19 |
| 1x26 | Award in Edgewise | 2007-04-26 |
| 1x27 | The Wall of Cynicism | 2007-05-31 |
| 1x28 | The Future of Persuasion | 2007-06-14 |
| 1x29 | Do This or Die | 2007-06-21 |

=== Season 2 ===
| Ep # | Broadcast # | Episode Title | Broadcast Date |
|---|---|---|---|
| 2x01 | 201 | There's Never a Marques of Queensbury Around When You Need One | 2008-01-12 |
| 2x02 | 202 | The Sport of Persuasion | 2008-01-19 |
| 2x03 | 203 | Old Media, New Media, Borrowed Media, Blue Media | 2008-01-26 |
| 2x04 | 204 | Branding the News | 2008-02-02 |
| 1x22 | 205 | Guerillas in our Midst | 2008-02-09 |
| 2x05 | 206 | Everything I Need to Know About Life I Learned from Agency Pitches | 2008-02-16 |
| 1x19 | 207 | Leaving Your Mark | 2008-02-23 |
| 2x06 | 208 | 23 things I'd Like to Change About Advertising | 2008-03-01 |
| 1x24 | 209 | Reviving the Brand | 2008-03-08 |
| 2x07 | 210 | The Trouble with Big | 2008-03-15 |
| 2x08 | 211 | Royal Jelly | 2008-03-22 |
| 2x09 | 212 | Advertisers as Censors | 2008-03-29 |
| 1x26 | 213 | Award in Edgewise | 2008-04-05 |
| 2x10 | 214 | Crowd Control | 2008-04-12 |
| 2x11 | 215 | The Strategy of Persuasion The importance of a strategy in advertising. | 2008-04-19 |
| 2x12 | 216 | In Defence of Advertising Terry O'Reilly defends advertising, arguing that an advertisement-free world would not be as nice as some people might think. | 2008-04-26 |
| 1x25 | 217 | It's the Insight, Stupid! The importance of an insight in modern persuasion. | 2008-05-03 |
| 2x13 | 218 | Emotion Why the best advertisers win customers through the heart, not with facts. | 2008-05-10 |
| 2x14 | 219 | The Myth of Mass Marketing An examination of the myth of "mass marketing" and the effectiveness of one-on-one selling. | 2008-05-17 |
| 2x15 | 220 | Selling War How advertising has been used (and is still being used) to recruit soldiers and create support for wars. | 2008-05-24 |
| 1x23 | 221 | Frontiers and Boundaries An examination of how what is acceptable in an advertising has changed over time and how this reflects the change in a society's values. | 2008-05-31 |
| 2x16 | 222 | Advertising as the New Sugar Daddy A short history of sponsorship in advertising. | 2008-06-07 |
| 2x17 | 223 | Persuasion in the Niches How (and why) the one-size-fits-all mass marketing is being replaced with marketing targeted at smaller market niches. | 2008-06-14 |
| 2x18 | 224 | Six Remarkable Brands Examples of six remarkable brands - including a media icon (Oprah Winfrey), a rock and roll band (The Beatles), an athlete (Muhammad Ali), a toy (Lego), a city (Las Vegas), and a large animal (polar bear). | 2008-06-21 |

=== Season 3 ===
| Ep # | Broadcast # | Episode Title | Broadcast Date |
|---|---|---|---|
| 3x01 | 301 | A Taste for Blood: Direct Marketing | 2009-01-05 |
| 3x02 | 302 | Recession Marketing | 2009-01-12 |
| 3x03 | 303 | Nasty is the New Nice | 2009-01-19 |
| 3x04 | 304 | Rethink the Shark | 2009-01-26 |
| 3x05 | 305 | According to Hoyle | 2009-02-02 |
| 1x09 | 306 | The Human Face of Persuasion | 2009-02-07 |
| 1x07 | 307 | Breaking the Contract | 2009-02-14 |
| 3x06 | 308 | Commandeering Holidays | 2009-02-19 |
| 3x07 | 309 | Great Canadian Campaigns | 2009-03-07 |
| 3x08 | 310 | Repetition Repetition Repetition | 2009-03-09 |
| 3x09 | 311 | Sun Tzu and the Art of... Persuasion | 2009-03-16 |
| 3x01 | 312 | A Taste for Blood: Direct Marketing | 2009-03-23 |
| 3x10 | 313 | Selling God | 2009-03-30 |
| 3x11 | 314 | Brand Loyalty | 2009-04-06 |
| 3x12 | 315 | Big and Small | 2009-04-13 |
| 3x02 | 316 | Recession Marketing | 2009-04-20 |
| 3x13 | 317 | The Real Deal: Authenticity | 2009-04-27 |
| 3x14 | 318 | The Myths of Persuasion | 2009-05-04 |
| 3x15 | 319 | Marketing the Invisible | 2009-05-11 |
| 3x07 | 320 | Great Canadian Campaigns | 2009-05-18 |
| 3x16 | 321 | Entertainment or Nothing | 2009-05-25 |
| 3x17 | 322 | The Museum of Persuasion | 2009-06-01 |
| 3x18 | 323 | Urban Legends | 2009-06-08 |
| 3x19 | 324 | Embracing New Media | 2009-06-15 |
| 3x20 | 325 | Ask Terry (2009) | 2009-06-22 |

=== Season 4 ===
| Ep # | Broadcast # | Episode Title | Broadcast Date |
|---|---|---|---|
| 4x01 | 401 | Marketing the Unpleasant | 2010-01-02 |
| 4x02 | 402 | Buzz | 2010-01-09 |
| 4x03 | 403 | Pitchmen | 2010-01-16 |
| 4x04 | 404 | Heroes & Villains | 2010-01-23 |
| 4x05 | 405 | Persuasion Fail | 2010-01-30 |
| 4x06 | 406 | Slogans | 2010-02-06 |
| 4x07 | 407 | Categories | 2010-02-13 |
| 4x08 | 408 | Are People Idiots? | 2010-02-20 |
| 4x09 | 409 | Being There: Selling Experiences | 2010-02-27 |
| 4x01 | 410 | Marketing the Unpleasant | 2010-03-06 |
| 4x10 | 411 | All Things Being Equal: Parity Products | 2010-03-13 |
| 4x11 | 412 | Context | 2010-03-20 |
| 4x02 | 413 | Buzz | 2010-03-27 |
| 4x12 | 414 | Oddballs: Singular Campaigns | 2010-04-03 |
| 4x13 | 415 | Privacy | 2010-04-10 |
| 4x03 | 416 | Pitchmen | 2010-04-17 |
| 4x14 | 417 | Where Power Resides | 2010-04-24 |
| 4x15 | 418 | Profiles in (Marketing) Courage | 2010-05-01 |
| 4x16 | 419 | Negative Advertising | 2010-05-08 |
| 4x17 | 420 | Opportunism | 2010-05-15 |
| 4x18 | 421 | A Few More Remarkable Brands | 2010-05-22 |
| 4x19 | 422 | Ask Terry Some More | 2010-05-29 |
| 4x20 | 423 | Looking For the Admen in Madmen | 2010-06-05 |

=== Season 5 ===
| Ep # | Broadcast # | Episode Title | Broadcast Date |
|---|---|---|---|
| 5x01 | 501 | It's Not Easy Being Green: Green Marketing | 2011-01-08 |
| 5x02 | 502 | Luxury Advertising | 2011-01-15 |
| 5x03 | 503 | Candid Commercials: Real People in Advertising | 2011-01-22 |
| 5x04 | 504 | Caution: Speed Bumps. The Magical Ingredient in Marketing | 2011-01-29 |
| 5x05 | 505 | Marketing Pioneers | 2011-02-05 |
| 5x06 | 506 | Even More Remarkable Brands | 2011-02-12 |
| 4x01 | 507 | Marketing the Unpleasant | 2011-02-19 |
| 5x07 | 508 | AOP Goes to the Movies | 2011-02-26 |
| 5x08 | 509 | The Commercials You Grew Up With | 2011-02-02 |
| 5x09 | 510 | Burn The Boats: Brands That Risked and Won | 2011-03-12 |
| 4x03 | 511 | Pitchmen | 2011-03-19 |
| 5x10 | 512 | Mad Women: The Great Women of Advertising | 2011-03-26 |
| 5x11 | 513 | Dynamic Duos: The Famous Partnerships in Advertising | 2011-04-02 |
| 5x12 | 514 | Three Foot Marketing: The Battleground In-Store | 2011-04-09 |
| 4x10 | 515 | All Things Being Equal: The Fascinating World of Parity Products | 2011-04-15 |
| 5x13 | 516 | The Happy Homemaker: How Advertising Invented the Housewife (Part One) | 2011-04-22 |
| 5x14 | 517 | The Happy Homemaker: How Advertising Invented the Housewife (Part Two) | 2011-04-30 |
| 5x15 | 518 | Genericide: When a Brand Becomes Generic | 2011-05-06 |
| 4x17 | 519 | Opportunism | 2011-05-13 |
| 5x16 | 520 | The Sound of Persuasion | 2011-05-21 |
| 5x17 | 521 | Ageism in Advertising | 2011-05-28 |
| 4x06 | 522 | Slogans | 2011-06-05 |
| 5x18 | 523 | Terry's Book Club | 2011-06-11 |
| 5x19 | 524 | Diversity in Advertising | 2011-06-18 |
| 5x20 | 525 | Ask Terry Again | 2011-06-25 |

== Opening theme ==
The title theme, composed by Ari Posner and Ian LeFeuvre, consists of a series of ten sound clips from ads and speeches, played over the theme music. Static is heard between each clip, giving the impression of changing between stations on a radio. The title is announced in the middle of the clips. In each episode, one clip is different, similar to the couch gag in the opening to The Simpsons.

=== Theme lyrics ===
==== Season 1 ====
Read. My. Lips. / This is the CBS News / I've fallen and I can't get up! / Don't be a square / The only thing we have to fear is... / (clip) / And now, Terry O'Reilly and The Age of Persuasion / Oh, the humanity! / Chops, dices, minces / Yeeeargh! / It's that simple.

==== Season 2 ====
I want chicken, I want liver / "I wanna bottle of Coca-Cola!" "Sonny..." / That's a spicy meat-a-ball! / Hey, great, a toothpaste should fight cavities / I can't believe I ate that whole... / (clip) / And now, Terry O'Reilly and The Age of Persuasion / Ho, ho, ho / Hoo-hoo! / Mamma mia! / There you go again.

==== Season 3 ====
I'm Barack Obama, and I approve this message / "Another cup of Maxwell House coffee, George?" "Sure, pour me a cup, Gracie!" / Hoo-wah! / "Hello, I'm a Mac," "And I'm a PC!" "Whooooo!" "Whoo!" / The only thing we have to fear is... / (clip) / And now, Terry O'Reilly and The Age of Persuasion / Bromo-Seltzer, Bromo-Seltzer, Bromo-Seltzer... / Got milk? / Don't leave home without it / Isn't that amazing?

==== Season 4 ====
I'm not a doctor, but I play one on TV / It's the fishing invention of the century / This is only a test / It's Patrick, he took out life insurance / I'm not only the Hair Club president, I'm also a client / The only thing we have to fear is... / (clip) / And now, Terry O'Reilly and The Age of Persuasion / Takes a licking and keeps on ticking / He likes it! Hey, Mikey! / Yes! We! Can!

==== Season 5 ====
Hello, ladies / Tacos... fettuccine, linguine, martini, bikini / Wow, what's that aftershave you're wearing? / Cough suppressant as effective as codeine, but not narcotic / It'll keep your kids quiet for hours / Tonight's episode brought to you by / (clip) / And now, Terry O'Reilly and The Age of Persuasion / We are not afraid to get mavericky in there / Ha-ha-ha-haaa / Thank you for your support.

== Running gags ==
- In the opening theme, one sound clip is changed in each episode which, when following the previous clip, makes up a nonsense sentence. Depending on the season, the preceding clip is either Franklin D. Roosevelt's "The only thing we have to fear is..." (from his famous inauguration speech)(seasons 1, 3 & 4), a man saying, "I can't believe I ate that whole..." (from a commercial for Alka-Seltzer)(season 2), or an announcer saying "Tonight's episode brought to you by..." (season 5).
- When Terry sets up the premise for an episode in the form of a letter from a listener, there is usually a postscript confusing Terry with retired ice hockey player Joseph James Terrence "Terry" O'Reilly, who played as a right-winger for the Boston Bruins.
- Terry directly interacts with "Keith" (Ohman, the engineer), usually to get him to play a recording clip. On more than one occasion, Keith has been asked for a hammer, which is then used to destroy a piece of electronic equipment playing something especially irksome.
- When it is necessary to define a phrase or concept, the definition is usually delivered by Steve Gardner, over a clip of upbeat 1950s-style educational film music.
- After Terry makes a pun, he "puts a dollar in the Age of Persuasion pun jar", accompanied by the sound of change being dropped into a glass jar. Examples include Home Depot having "nailed down" its emotional hook and Beethoven being able to reject "overtures" from nobles.
- When Terry mentions an object with potentially injurious consequences, such as a Taser or a pneumatic nail gun, a sound effect of the device in action is played, followed by a man with a low-pitched voice quietly saying, "Ow."
- Throughout season 4, co-creator Mike Tennant appears on location in various settings, such as in the audience of a medicine show or as a shill in an auction.
- During the end credits, the announcer makes commentary on the people mentioned, the comments invariably being linked to the episode's theme. The announcer is the same woman for all seasons except Season 3, when she was replaced by a man (Mike Tennant) who began the credits by saying, "Say, folks..."

== End Credits ==
(Seasons 1–4)

- Created and written by Terry O'Reilly and Mike Tennant
- Engineer, Keith Ohman
- Title music by Ari Posner and Ian Lefeuvre
- The Age of Persuasion is produced for CBC Radio by Pirate Radio & Television, Toronto

(Season 5)

- Written by Terry O'Reilly
- Engineer, Keith Ohman
- Title music by Ari Posner and Ian Lefeuvre
- Created by Terry O'Reilly and Mike Tennant
- The Age of Persuasion is produced by Pirate Toronto & New York

=== Awards ===
New York Festivals, World's Best Radio Programs & Promotions

AOP Goes to the Movies

- Business/Consumer Issues: Gold
- Best Writing: Silver

Speed Bumps

- Best Writing: Silver
- Business/Consumer Issues: Bronze

Grand Award: AOP Goes to the Movies

New York Festivals, World's Best Radio Programs & Promotions

The Happy Homemaker: How Advertising Invented the Housewife

- Business/Consumer Issues: Gold

Luxury Advertising

- Best Writing: Silver

Grand Award: The Happy Homemaker: How Advertising Invented the Housewife
