= Under the Influence (radio series) =

- Running time: 30 minutes
- Country of origin: Canada
- Language: English
- Home station: CBC Radio One
- Hosted by: Terry O'Reilly
- Produced by: Debbie O'Reilly
- Edited by: Callie O'Reilly
- Original release: January 7, 2012
- No. of series: 10
- Website: www.cbc.ca/radio/undertheinfluence
- Podcast: www.cbc.ca/radio/podcasts/arts-culture/under-the-influence/

Under the Influence is a Canadian radio documentary series about marketing and advertising presented by former adman Terry O'Reilly. It premiered on January 7, 2012, on CBC Radio One and currently has over a million radio listeners per week as well as over 25 million podcast downloads.

The series serves as a follow-up to two previous programs hosted by O'Reilly, O'Reilly on Advertising (2005) and The Age of Persuasion (2006–2011). While those shows focused primarily on advertising, this series focuses on marketing.

== Episode guide ==
=== Season 1 ===
Season One Episode Guide

Episode	Title	Broadcast Date
1x01	A New BRIC in the Wall	January 7, 2012
1x02	Men Are From Sears	January 14, 2012
1x03	Voices of Influence	January 21, 2012
1x04	Great Brands That Never Advertise	January 28, 2012
1x05	Getting Personal in the Classified Ads	February 4, 2012
1x06	Big Chill Marketing: The Influence of Music	February 11, 2012
1x07	The Marketing Genius of Steve Jobs - Part 1	February 18, 2012
1x08	The Marketing Genius of Steve Jobs - Part 2	February 25, 2012
1x09	Movie Marketing	March 3, 2012
1x10	Marketing in a Crisis	March 10, 2012
1x11	Accidental Brands	March 17, 2012
1x12	Handcuffed By Brand Image	March 24, 2012
1x13	When Big Brands Houdini	March 31, 2012
1x14	Mascots	April 7, 2012
1x15	Charlie Bit My Ad: When Advertising Works Too Well	April 14, 2012
1x16	Sex in Advertising	April 21, 2012
1x17	Hyper-Targeting: How Brands Track You Online	April 28, 2012
1x18	Colour Schemes: How Colours Make Us Buy	May 5, 2012
1x19	Brand Envy 2012	May 12, 2012
1x20	When Brands Apologize: Sorry Seems to Be the Smartest Word	May 19, 2012
1x21	Books, Books, Books	May 26, 2012
1x22	LGBT Advertising: Chasing the Pink Dollar	June 2, 2012
1x23	It's the Little Things	June 9, 2012
1x24	Striking Images: Matchbook Advertising	June 16, 2012
1x25	Dear Terry	June 23, 2012

=== Season 2 ===
Season Two Episode Guide

Episode#	Broadcast #	Title	Broadcast Date
2x01	201	SHAME: The Secret Tool of Marketing	January 5, 2013
2x02	202	A Prize In Every Box: Premiums, Toys and Box-Tops	January 12, 2013
2x03	203	Timing Is Everything	January 19, 2013
2x04	204	Radio Is Dead. Long Live Radio	January 26, 2013
2x05	205	Buy Less: How Some Companies Profit By Asking You To Spend Less	February 2, 2013
2x06	206	Look What They've Done To My Song, Ma	February 9, 2013
2x07	208	Coming Soon - The Art Of The Movie Trailer	February 23, 2013
2x08	209	Marketing Stunts	March 2, 2013
2x09	210	Billion Dollar Brands	March 9, 2013
2x10	211	Tales of Customer Service	March 16, 2013
2x11	212	Selling Danger	March 23, 2013
2x12	214	Famous Marketing Blunders	April 6, 2013
2x13	215	Game Shows As Marketing	April 13, 2013
2x14	216	Loss Leaders: How Companies Profit By Losing Money	April 20, 2013
2x15	217	Brand Envy 2013	April 27, 2013
2x16	219	Nothing In Common: How Hollywood Portrays Ad People	May 11, 2013
2x17	220	Real Time Advertising	May 18, 2013
2x18	221	Nobody's Dead Anymore: Marketing Deceased Celebrities	May 25, 2013
2x19	223	Trust In Advertising	June 2, 2013
2x20	224	This I Know	June 15, 2013
2x21	225	Dear Terry	June 22, 2013

=== Season 3 ===
Season Three Episode Guide

Episode #	Broadcast #	Title	Broadcast Date
3x01	301	Looking Out For #1	January 4, 2014
3x02	302	The Psychology of Price	January 11, 2014
3x03	303	Cause Marketing	January 18, 2014
3x04	304	Marketing Rock'N'Roll Part I	January 25, 2014
3x05	305	Marketing Rock'N'Roll Part II	February 1, 2014
3x06	306	Marketing The Olympics	February 8, 2014
3x07	307	Ambush Marketing	February 15, 2014
3x08	309	Have It Your Way: How Mass Customization Is Changing Marketing	March 1, 2014
3x09	310	Viral Videos	March 8, 2014
3x10	311	Advertising Alumni	March 15, 2014
3x11	312	Sunny With A Chance of Mousetraps: How Weather Affects Marketing	March 22, 2014
3x12	314	Elevator Pitches	April 5, 2014
3x13	315	Terry's Bookshelf	April 12, 2014
3x14	316	Brand Envy 2014	April 19, 2014
3x15	317	Nudge: The Persuasive Power of Whispers	April 26, 2014
3x16	319	When Founders Are The Face of the Company	May 10, 2014
3x17	320	Selling Death	May 17, 2014
3x18	321	21st Century Brands	May 24, 2014
3x19	323	Satisfaction Guaranteed	June 7, 2014
3x20	324	When Brands Mock Other Brands	June 14, 2014
3x21	325	Dear Terry 2014	June 21, 2014

=== Season 4 ===
Episode #	Broadcast #	Title	Broadcast Date
4x01	401	Strange Brands	January 3, 2015
4x02	402	Controversy Advertising	January 10, 2015
4x03	403	Selling Ugly	January 17, 2015
4x04	404	Selling The Moon: Part 1	January 24, 2015
4x05	405	Selling The Moon: Part 2	January 31, 2015
4x06	406	Marketing Hit Songs	February 7, 2015
4x07	408	For Your Consideration: The Hollywood Oscar Campaigns The Public Never Sees	February 21, 2015
4x08	409	Geography As Branding	February 28, 2015
4x09	410	The Sharing Economy	March 7, 2015
4x10	411	Giftvertising	March 14, 2015
4x11	413	The Marketing Innovations Episode	March 28, 2015
4x12	414	Limited Edition Brands	April 4, 2015
4x13	415	Tourism Marketing	April 11, 2015
4x14	416	Brand Envy 2015	April 18, 2015
4x15	417	Show Me The Money: The World of Product Placement	April 25, 2015
4x16	419	Even In The Dark: How Packaging Persuades You To Buy	May 9, 2015
4x17	420	Sue Me, Sue You Blues: Famous Advertising Lawsuits	May 16, 2015
4x18	421	Bookmarks 2015	May 23, 2015
4x19	422	The Internet of (Marketing) Things	May 30, 2015
4x20	424	Selling Yourself: The Art of Personal Branding	June 13, 2015
4x21	425	Ask Terry 2015	June 20, 2015

=== Season 5 ===
Season Five Episode Guide

Episode #	Broadcast #	Title	Broadcast Date
5x01	501	How Marketing Created Rituals	January 5, 2016
5x02	502	Promise Less, Profit More	January 13, 2016
5x03	503	Zombie Brands	January 20, 2016
5x04	504	When Marketers Lie	January 27, 2016
5x05	505	Small Move, Big Gain	February 3, 2016
5x06	506	Words Invented By Marketers	February 10, 2016
5x07	508	Movie Merchandising	February 24, 2016
5x08	509	Achilles Heel Advertising: Repositioning The Competition	March 2, 2016
5x09	510	Live and Let Buy: Where You Live Dictates What You Purchase	March 9, 2016
5x10	511	Liar For Hire: And Other Strange Service Companies	March 16, 2016
5x11	513	Bouncing Back: How Marketers Survive Debacles	March 30, 2016
5x12	514	World’s Oldest Brands	April 6, 2016
5x13	515	Business As Unusual: The World of B2B Advertising	April 13, 2016
5x14	516	Brand Envy (2016)	April 20, 2016
5x15	518	Strange Bedfellows: Advertising & Porn – Part I	May 4, 2016
5x16	519	Strange Bedfellows: Advertising & Porn – Part II	May 11, 2016
5x17	520	Radio Still Makes Waves	May 18, 2016
5x18	521	Persuasive Perks: The World of Loyalty Programs	May 25, 2016
5x19	522	Bookmarks 2016	June 1, 2016
5x20	523	When Madison Avenue Met Broadway: The World of Industrial Musicals	June 8, 2016
5x21	524	Commercial Parodies	June 15, 2016
5x22	525	Ask Terry (2016)	June 22, 2016

=== Season 6 ===
Episode #	Broadcast #	Title	Broadcast Date
6x01	601	The Crazy World of Trademarks	January 5, 2017
6x02	602	Unforeseen Circumstances: How Companies are Affected by Chance	January 12, 2017
6x03	603	Passport Revoked: When Brands Fail Internationally	January 19, 2017
6x04	604	What A Difference A Difference Makes: Standing Out In The Marketplace	January 26, 2017
6x05	605	Judgment Day: Super Bowl Advertising	February 2, 2017
6x06	606	Lead Balloons: When Negative Brand Names Work	February 9, 2017
6x07	608	Brands In Cars Getting Coffee: Sponsorship Marketing	February 23, 2017
6x08	609	The Elephant in the Room: Humane Marketing vs. Profit	March 2, 2017
6x09	610	The Odd Couple: Unlikely Marketing Collaborations	March 9, 2017
6x10	611	The Frankenstein Factor: Inventors Who Regret Their Inventions	March 16, 2017
6x11	613	The Wizarding world of Influencer Marketing	March 30, 2017
6x12	614	Selling the Dream: Real Estate Advertising	April 6, 2017
6x13	616	Brand Envy: #Canada150	May 11, 2017
6x14	618	The Lean Mean Money Machine: How Marketing Affects Sports	June 1, 2017
6x15	619	Now Splinter Free: How Marketing Broke Taboos	June 8, 2017
6x16	620	Cannes Creative Advertising Be Effective?	June 15, 2017
6x17	621	Bookmarks 2017	June 22, 2017
6x18	622	Ask Terry 2017	June 29, 2017
6x19	628	Guys and Dolls: Gender Marketing, Part 1	August 12, 2017
6x20	629	Guys and Dolls: Gender Marketing, Part 2	August 17, 2017
6x21	630	Grab Your Wallets: When Brands Go Political	August 24, 2017
6x22	631	The Most Interesting Adman in the World: The Story of Albert Lasker	August 31, 2017

=== Season 7 ===
Episode #	Broadcast #	Title	Broadcast Date
7x01	701	Put It Between Your Knees and Squeeze: Marketing A Fad	January 4, 2018
7x02	702	I See A Little Silhouetto Of A Brand: How Old School Products Survive	January 11, 2018
7x03	703	Damn the Torpedoes	January 18, 2018
7x04	704	Underwear In Your Mailbox: Subscription Marketing	January 25, 2018
7x05	705	Delicious Names: Marketing Appetite Appeal	January 30, 2018
7x06	706	A Wild & Crazy Idea: How Companies Solve Big, Hairy Problems	February 8, 2018
7x07	707	Comic Book Ads	February 15, 2018
7x08	708	Kentucky Fried Brand Myths	February 22, 2018
7x09	709	Celebrities: Living To Tell The Tales	March 1, 2018
7x10	710	Worthless to Priceless	March 8, 2018
7x11	711	Three products you didn't know were named after their inventors	March 15, 2018
7x12	712	Famous Jingles: How a franchisee gone rogue inspired the Big Mac Song	March 22, 2018
7x13	713	Famous Jingles, Part Two	March 29, 2018
7x14	715	Hey Vern! When Ads Go Hollywood	April 12, 2018
7x15	716	Brand Envy 2018	April 19, 2018
7x16	717	Bookmarks 2018	April 26, 2018
7x17	718	Lemonade: Marketing a Negative	May 3, 2018
7x18	720	Avon Calling: Door to Door Marketing	May 17, 2018
7x19	721	Marching Orders: Household Products Invented by the Military	May 24, 2018
7x20	722	Guinness Book of World Ad Records	May 30, 2018
7x21	723	How Tourism Survives a Tragedy	June 7, 2018
7x22	724	Fasten Your Seatbelts: How Self-Driving Cars and Marketing Collide	June 14, 2018
7x23	725	Ask Terry 2018	June 21, 2018

=== Season 9 ===
Episode	Title	Broadcast Date
9x01	Same Bat Time, Same Bat Channel: Marketing TV Shows	May 28, 2020
9x02	Goliath Meet David: Small Brands That Beat The Big Boys	January 9, 2020
9x03	Putting Fans In Stands: How Sports Teams Sell Tickets	January 16, 2020
9x04	Sound + Vision: Album Covers As Marketing	January 23, 2020
9x05	Sound + Vision: Album Covers As Marketing, Part Two	January 30, 2020
9x06	Set Jetting: Film Locations As Tourism Marketing	February 6, 2020
9x07	Getting Personal In The Classified Ads	February 13, 2020
9x08	The Name Game: Brand Names In Different Countries	February 20, 2020
9x09	Search Parties: The Relentless Hunt For New Customers	February 27, 2020
9x10	Come Fly With Me: Airports Are Now Brands	March 5, 2020
9x11	For Better or For Worse: Wedding Marketing	March 12, 2020
9x13	Lend Us Your Ears: The Intimate Art of ASMR Marketing	March 26, 2020
9x14	Thumbs Up or Thumbs Down: The New World of Online Reviews	April 2, 2020
9x15	Takes a Licking and Keeps on Ticking: Advertising Torture Tests	April 9, 2020
9x16	Brand Envy 2020	April 16, 2020
9x18	Talk Ain’t Cheap: How Conversations Impact Business	April 30, 2020
9x19	Flip, Flop or Fly: The World of Test Markets	May 7, 2020
9x20	Setting The Table: Best Opening Stories	May 14, 2020
9x21	Fix It Again, Tony: Brand Nicknames	May 21, 2020
9x23	Bookmarks 2020	June 4, 2020
9x24	Branding A Disease	June 11, 2020
9x25	You Must Remember This: The Mandela Effect	June 18, 2020

=== Season 10 ===
Episode	Title	Broadcast Date
10x01	The Times They Are A-Changin': Brands Crushed By Zeitgeist	January 7, 2021
10x02	Switch-Pitchers: When Spokespeople Change Brands	January 14, 2021
10x03	You're Soaking In It: Female Brand Icons	January 21, 2021
10x04	Escape Or Die Frying: The Art Of The Movie Poster	January 28, 2021
10x05	It’s a bird, it’s a plane, it’s Superheroes in Advertising!	February 4, 2021
10x07	It’s Finger Lickin’ Bad: Marketing in the Time of Covid	February 18, 2021
10x08	Celestial Advertising: The Art of Skywriting	February 25, 2021
10x09	The Future Is Furry: Animals In Advertising	March 4, 2021
10x10	Brand Envy 2021	March 11, 2021
10x11	Brands Are People, Too: Products Named After Inventors (Encore)	March 18, 2021
10x12	Air Quotes: Creative Radio 2021	March 25, 2021
10x13	Red Carpet Marketing: The Business of Award Shows	April 1, 2021
10x14	One Toke Over The Line: 50-Year Marketing Milestones	April 8, 2021
10x15	Who Will Buy My Memories: Fan Club Marketing	April 15, 2021
10x16	I Can’t Believe I Ate The Whole Thing: Surviving The Ad Biz	April 22, 2021
10x17	Son of Crocodile Dundee: Nostalgia Advertising	April 29, 2021
10x18	There’s Something About Mary: Mad Woman Mary Wells)	May 6, 2021
10x20	Bookmarks 2021	May 20, 2021
10x21	Too Many Turk Brodas: Trading Card Marketing	May 27, 2021
10x22	The Show Must Go On: Broadway Marketing	June 3, 2021
10x23	Tombstone Tourists: The Growth of Cemetery Tourism	June 10, 2021
10x24	Can’t Get Enough of the Wonderful Duff: Fake Hollywood Brands	June 17, 2021
10x25	Ask Terry 2021	June 24, 2021

=== Season 11 ===
Episode	Title	Broadcast Date
11x01	Number Fever: Surprising Stories of Bottle Cap Marketing	January 5, 2022
11x02	Perry Mason Moments: The Most Unexpected Ads of 2021	January 12, 2022

== Credits ==
- Terry O'Reilly - Creator, Writer, Producer, Host
- Debbie O'Reilly - Series Producer
- Keith Ohman - Sound Engineer
- Geoff Devine - Sound Engineer
- Ian LeFeuvre and Ari Posner - Theme Music
- Sidney O'Reilly - Co-Writer, Digital Content Producer & Social Media Manager
- Callie O'Reilly - Graphic Designer, Audio Editor
- James Gangl, Jillian Gora, Allison Pinches, Abby Forsyth, & Patrick James Asselin - Researchers
- Lama Balaghi, Tanya Moryoussef, Margy Gilmour, Myra El-Bayoumi, Courteney Pitcher and Warren Brown - Past Researchers
