= 24 Shades of Blue =

Canadian police podcast

- Genre: Law enforcement
- Format: Interview

Creative team
- Created by: Toronto Police Service

Cast and voices
- Hosted by: Andy O'Brien, and Axel Villamil

Production
- Production: Obie & Ax Inc

Publication
- Original release: November 2020

Related
- Website: www.obieandax.com/project/24-shades-of-blue

24 Shades of Blue is a law enforcement podcast that first aired in November 2020. It is funded by the Toronto Police Service and produced by Obie & Ax Inc.

The Police funding of the podcast was criticised by Toronto politicians in 2023.

== Production ==
24 Shades of Blue It is funded by the Toronto Police Service and produced by Obie & Ax Inc. Production costs exceeded $300,000. Toronto Police Service have editorial control over the podcast's content.

The podcast was launched in November 2020. As of mid February 2023, the podcast had reached 94,500 listeners.

== Format ==
The podcast is presented as a series of interviews and is hosted by Andy O'Brien and Axel Villamil, of the production company Obie & Ax Inc.

Espies include an interview with Black police officer Stacy Clarke.

== Critical reception ==
Former Toronto mayor John Sewell questioned if the city's police needed to spend their money on a podcast. Toronto city councillor Josh Matlow was critical that the production of the podcast was awarded through a non-competitive process.
