= Jesse Brown (journalist) =

Canadian journalist

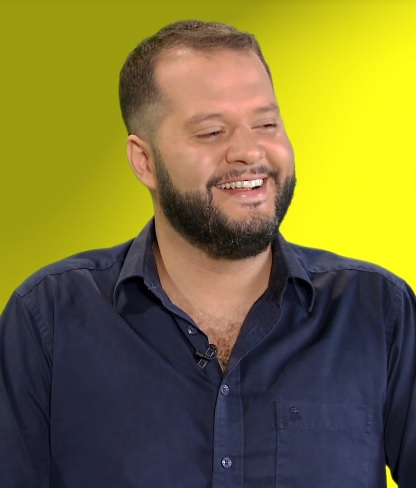
- Brown on his program Canadaland in 2013
- Born: 1977 (age 49); Toronto, Ontario, Canada
- Citizenship: Canadian
- Education: McGill University
- Occupations: media personality, businessperson
- Website: CANADALAND

Jesse Benjamin Brown (born 1977) is a Canadian media entrepreneur. He worked as a media hoaxster and a humour columnist, then in 2013, he launched the Canadaland podcast company focused on media criticism and current events, which he also edits, produces, and frequently hosts.

== Early life ==
Born to a Canadian Jewish family and raised in Toronto, Brown attended Northern Secondary School.

At sixteen, Brown interned at Q107 through his high school’s co-op program. A year later, inspired by punk zines and a movie called Pump Up the Volume, he launched Punch, a student newspaper that stirred controversy by rating teachers. The backlash landed him on CBC’s Metro Morning and helped turn Punch into an underground paper.

== Media hoaxes ==
Brown pulled his first media hoaxes while he was a student studying English at McGill University—most notably tricking CTV Montreal into airing a segment on a fake startup, Babytalk.com, that claimed to teach infants to communicate with other babies in Japanese, Australian, and German.

Between 2003 and 2004, Brown wrote a humour column in the Saturday Night magazine in Toronto. Simultaneously, he continued hoaxing media and that served as fodder for the column. In 2003, using a pseudonym Stuart Neihardt, Brown staged a media hoax that several Canadian publications fell for and reported on as news by publicizing the launch of Stu, a "regular guy magazine for the adequate man" envisioned as an antidote to then popular lad magazines such as FHM and Maxim.

== Business career ==
In 2007, together with a high school friend, cartoonist Jacob Blackstock, Brown started Bitstrips, an online app that allowed people to make cartoon-like avatars.

Brown continued as a co-owner of Bitstrips and in November 2013 the company attracted a $3 million investment from Horizons Ventures, a venture capital firm owned by Sir Li Ka-shing. In October 2014, the company announced new $8 million funding from Kleiner Perkins Caufield & Byers. The same month, the company launched the spinoff Bitmoji. After it became available on iOS and Android, the application found immediate success in the Apple App Store, reportedly ranking consistently in the top 10 utility apps.

In 2016, Bitstrips was acquired by Snapchat for $US 100 million. Brown has never publicly disclosed his share of profits from the sale.

== Media career ==
While still in university, Jesse Brown freelanced for Vice.. In 2006, he hosted The Contrarians, a weekly CBC Radio One show that explored provocative arguments—including claims that feminism had achieved its goals and that multiculturalism was superficial.

Brown landed in hot water with his producers after they discovered he had faked a scene in his pilot episode.

Brown later hosted Search Engine, a program on technology and digital culture. After CBC cancelled the show on its radio platform in 2008, the show continued as a podcast through CBC and then TVOntario until 2009. In 2011, Brown began a tech blog about media and technology for Maclean’s, though none of his work made the then weekly magazine's print issue.

=== Canadaland ===
According to Brown, he made four unsuccessful pitches to mainstream Canadian outlets for a media criticism show before launching his own independent, weekly podcast, Canadaland, in October 2013. Initially sponsored by Toronto-based FreshBooks, then briefly by Audible.com and later Squarespace, the show struggled to cover costs, prompting Brown to launch a Patreon campaign in October 2014, revealing it drew about 10,000 weekly listeners.

In March 2014, Brown learned of allegations of non-consensual violence and workplace harassment against CBC host Jian Ghomeshi, and co-reported these with Toronto Star reporter Kevin Donovan. In his book, Secret Life: The Jian Ghomeshi Investigation, Donovan credited Brown’s contributions but said they clashed over approach, describing Brown as having a habit of finishing interviewees’ sentences, and “reluctant to ask his sources tough questions.” In the wake of the story, Canadaland grew in popularity, gaining crowdfunded financial support through Patreon.

Ghomeshi was acquitted in 2016 after the judge found major inconsistencies and “outright deception” in witness testimony. A remaining charge was later withdrawn when he signed a peace bond and apologized to the complainant without admitting guilt.

Brown later expanded the brand with new shows, including Canadaland Commons on Canadian politics and The Imposter on Canada’s arts scene (both now discontinued).

In April 2026, PressProgress reported that Brown was banned from Reddit after securing temporary moderator access to r/Canadaland to investigate anonymous users who had criticized him, the podcast and staff members including Sam Konnert, Noor Azrieh and Julian Abraham, who discussed their anger about the criticism on Canadaland’s own podcast. Brown admitted to 'spear phishing' Reddit accounts that criticized him and staff, and sending IP-tracking links to lawyer and author Mark Bourrie, but denied sending the same phishing links to other journalists who also reported receiving them. Although Canadaland obtained a number of IP addresses, the effort failed to identify any of its anonymous critics.

On October 8, 2026, Brown announced that he would no longer host Canadaland podcast episodes, but would "remain Canadaland’s editorial and business head," naming Harrison Lowman as Canadaland's new managing editor.

=== Coverage of antisemitism and Israel-Gaza war ===
Following the October 7, 2023 attacks by Hamas and the subsequent Gaza war, Brown began reporting more frequently on antisemitism in Canada. He criticized Canadian news organizations for their coverage of antisemitic incidents and pro-Palestinian demonstrations. In November 2023, he published an editorial podcast, "Is Jesse a Zionist?", addressing criticism of his commentary on Israel and antisemitism.

In December 2023, the Canadaland Union issued a statement criticizing Brown's public comments about other journalists. The union described his statements as misleading and targeted and said they fell below the standards expected of a journalist whose work included media criticism.

Brown gave a talk at Toronto's Adath Israel synagogue, in May 2024, titled "The Slow Pogrom: Antisemitism in Canadian Media". He accused Canadian journalists of failing to recognize antisemitism associated with some pro-Palestinian demonstrations. Writing in The Maple, Davide Mastracci criticized Brown's interpretation of the protests and questioned his use of historical comparisons, including references to Kristallnacht. Mastracci argued that Brown had treated incidents involving individual protesters as evidence of broader antisemitism within the pro-Palestinian movement. Brown disputed aspects of Mastracci's account of the talk.

In October 2024, Brown intervened in the editing of an episode of Canadaland's Short Cuts podcast concerning Israel and Gaza. Among the changes was the removal of a statement about Canadian arms sales to Israel and the deaths of Palestinian children. Journalists Justin Ling and Paris Marx criticized the edits as politically motivated. Brown maintained that the changes improved the episode. Ling subsequently stopped contributing to the program. Other staff members also left Canadaland during this period, amid disagreements over Brown's editorial control.

Brown interviewed Israel's ambassador to Canada, Iddo Moed, on the first anniversary of October 7. Following the interview, Canadaland journalists Noor Azrieh and Cherise Seucharan published an article identifying statements by Brown and Moed that they considered inaccurate, unsupported or lacking context. They challenged Brown's characterization of pro-Palestinian demonstrations, arguing that the presence of antisemitic rhetoric at some protests did not establish that such views represented the movement as a whole.

Brown said, in September 2024, that Canadaland had lost approximately nine percent of its financial supporters since he began focusing more attention on antisemitism. He said he intended to continue covering the subject despite the loss of support.

In November 2025, Brown released What Is Happening Here, a six-part podcast series about antisemitism in Canada following the October 2023 attacks. Co-produced by Canadaland and The Canadian Jewish News, the series included interviews with Jewish Canadians, anti-Zionist activists and public figures. Among those interviewed were anti-Zionist activist Dave Meslin and Moez Zaman, a spokesperson for pro-Palestinian demonstrations in Toronto.

The series was criticized by Scott Martin in a three-part series published by The Catch. Martin argued that Brown had approached the subject with a predetermined view of anti-Zionism, relied on insufficiently examined evidence and failed to adequately consider the influence of Israel's actions in Gaza on Canadian protests. Martin also questioned Brown's comparison of Canadian and American hate-crime statistics, arguing that the figures were not directly comparable. Brown defended aspects of his reporting in correspondence with Martin.

Martin also criticized Brown's interview with Moez Zaman, arguing that Brown had not adequately addressed Zaman's explanation that demonstrations at Bathurst Street and Sheppard Avenue were organized in response to pro-Israel demonstrations at the same location. Journalist and academic Blake Lambert characterized Brown's approach as "fear-based journalism" and questioned whether the series adequately examined views outside those of established pro-Israel organizations.

Following the release of the third episode of the series, interviewee Dave Meslin accused Brown of misrepresenting his account of a pro-Palestinian demonstration by suggesting that antisemitic chanting had occurred during a Palestine Youth Movement march. Brown disputed the accusation. However, on November 27, 2025, Canadaland corrected the third episode after incorrectly reporting that protesters who shouted racist slogans had marched with the Palestine Youth Movement during an October demonstration. The correction stated that the protesters had been at the advertised location of the event but had not participated in the march.

In September 2026, during the 2026 Toronto mayoral election campaign, Brown moderated a mayoral candidates' forum on antisemitism and public safety organized by Jewish Lawyers of Canada at Adath Israel. His selection as moderator was criticized because of his previous public criticism of incumbent mayor Olivia Chow. Writing in August, commentator Jake Landau questioned Brown's ability to moderate the event impartially, citing his editorial disputes at Canadaland and his statements about anti-Zionism. Brown responded that he would treat Chow fairly if she participated. Chow declined to attend, saying she would not participate in campaign debates before the formal launch of her re-election campaign on September 9. Brown said he would have stepped aside as moderator if his involvement prevented her participation. The event proceeded with candidates Brad Bradford and Chris Alexander.

On October 8, 2026, Jesse Brown announced that he would step down as host of Canadaland’s flagship podcast while remaining editor and publisher, shifting his reporting and commentary to what he called “the Palestine issue.” His plans included a new investigative podcast about anti-Zionism, which he has described as a “hate movement.” In his commentary, Brown has linked pro-Palestinian and anti-Zionist activism to antisemitism and argued that government concessions to protesters have worsened harm toward Canadian Jews.

== Reception ==
In a piece in NOW Magazine, Vidya Kauri said that Brown had broken important stories, but that he was "...too quick to publish things that seem to be based on rumors or the bitter feelings of (ex-) employees with an agenda."

Simon Houpt, in a piece for The Globe and Mail, criticized Brown for having "a track record of playing fast and loose with facts", citing, among other things, an incident in which Brown defended controversial right-wing Canadian media personality Ezra Levant after Levant attacked Ontario's Greater Essex County District School Board for issuing a memo which he falsely claimed said that "teachers should be prepared to exempt Muslim students from Remembrance Day". In a podcast episode, Brown accused the school board of lying about this and of doctoring the memo in order to "cover their tracks"; this allegation was subsequently proven false. A week later, Brown acknowledged this and announced a correction, but neglected to edit or remove the episode in which he made these claims. Houpt also quoted a writer for the Montreal Gazette who stated that "Canadaland has a habit of sensationalizing and editorializing".

In a blog post published by the Huffington Post, Jesse Ferreras described Brown as a "mistake-prone media critic who is perilously short on self-reflection."

== Lawsuits ==
In 2020, Keean Bexte, a journalist then associated with Rebel News, sued Brown, claiming that Brown’s comments on a CANADALAND podcast unfairly damaged his reputation and standing among peers. Bexte alleged that the remarks were made without supporting evidence and were driven by malice and the goal of driving traffic to the outlet. Canadaland and Brown deny that Bexte suffered damages due to their comments and characterize their criticism as part of legitimate journalistic debate.

In 2024, Canadaland settled a defamation lawsuit involving Calgary homebuilders Shane and Edith Wenzel. The outlet avoided paying damages after agreeing to issue a correction to the original story.

=== Theresa Kielburger lawsuit ===
In August 2021, Jesse Brown and Canadaland produced and aired a podcast called The White Saviors which alleged that Theresa Kielburger, mother of Craig and Marc Kielburger, the founders of WE Charity (formerly Free the Children), had deposited hundreds of thousands of dollars in donations to WE Charity into her own bank account. Mrs. Kielburger, a retired teacher in her late 70s, sued Brown and Canadaland for defamation, seeking $3 million in compensation for damage to her reputation. Brown sought to have the lawsuit dismissed, calling it a strategic lawsuit against public participation (SLAPP).

In May 2024, Ontario Superior Court Justice Edward Morgan rejected Brown's motion for dismissal, allowing the lawsuit to proceed. Justice Morgan concluded that Brown's allegations against Mrs. Kielburger were false, that Brown knew they were false, and that Brown had failed to follow established journalistic practices to verify his reporting, writing "The fact that [Brown] was speaking about the plaintiff and imposing personal pain on the plaintiff by repeating an allegation about her that he was aware had been seriously contested, if not established as entirely false, was seen by him as irrelevant".

Justice Morgan also found that Brown had failed to contact Mrs. Kielburger, depriving her of a chance to respond to Brown’s allegations. Brown had said that he didn't bother to do so "for the same reason why I didn’t seek comment from my own mother." Justice Morgan wrote, "The cynicism of Brown's explanation not only accentuates the defamatory sting of his words, but could be considered high handed and oppressive", and that Brown had proceeded as if "the [Mrs. Kielburger's] feelings are worth nothing."

On June 9, 2026, Brown settled the lawsuit by reading out a public retraction and apology to Theresa Kielburger in court and agreeing to pay $775,000 in damages, in addition to a $110,000 payment for costs ordered by the court when Brown's anti-SLAPP motion had been dismissed. Brown said in court that he "wholly retracts" comments that Kielburger had deposited hundreds of thousands of dollars in donations to a family bank account and that his allegations were "unfounded".

== Phishing admission ==
In April, 2026, Brown admitted to using fake emails to trick four journalists and an author, Mark Bourrie, into revealing their Internet Protocol (IP) addresses (a type of phishing), incorrectly believing that the authors of posts on Reddit that were critical of him were actually sockpuppet accounts all controlled by Bourrie. Brown convinced the moderator of the Canadaland subreddit to give him temporary moderating powers to "investigate". Both Brown and the moderator were subsequently banned by Reddit.

== Personal life ==
Brown is married to Katie Minsky, and they have two children including a son named Isaac.
