= Slava Pastuk =

Canadian author and former drug smuggler

- Born: Yaroslav Pastukhov; June 1990 (age 36); Kyiv, Ukraine
- Occupations: Drug Dealer, Writer, Music Journalist and Editor
- Notable work: Bad Trips, 2022

Yaroslav Pastukhov (born June 1990), more commonly known as Slava Pastuk, is a Ukrainian-born Canadian author, former prisoner, drug smuggler and music editor.

He made national news in Canada in 2017 after drug smugglers he recruited were arrested. He was arrested in 2019 and sentenced to nine years. He was released in April 2022 for day parole.

== Early life ==
Born as Yaroslav Pastukhov in Kyiv, Ukraine, in June 1990. In 1994, he moved with his mother from Ukraine to Canada, initially staying in the Ukrainian Mission on College Street, Toronto before moving to the Greek Town area. A few years later he and his mother moved to Barrie, where he attended the St. Joan of Arc High School, and worked part time at the local Shoppers Drug Mart where he also stole perfume and cologne to order.

== Career and adult life ==
Upon moving to Toronto in 2011, Pastuk worked interviewing rappers for a YouTube show called "First Encounters" for local blog hustleGRL, run by Karla Moy. He was named as "One to Watch" by York University's Emerge Magazine in 2012.

Although Pastuk initially moved to Toronto to work in marketing, he quit in 2014 after his breakout interview with Donald Glover aka Childish Gambino. He took a job as the Editor at Noisey, part of Vice Media, based in Toronto. As a writer, he adopted the pen name Slava Pastuk.

As a reporter and editor for Vice, he spent the 2010s attending free parties, and writing about musicians. Simultaneous to his Vice employment, Pastuk supplemented his income by DJ-ing and selling marijuana to people he met on Grindr. During his time at VICE he interviewed Toronto rappers who at that time were unknown to the mainstream but would go on to be Toronto fixtures. He was the first journalist to interview rappers like Casper, Murda Beatz, and Top 5, earning himself a reputation as "Toronto's most trusted music journalist." Upon his release from prison, he would cite these interviews as being vital for his survival in jail, as Casper came to say hello when both of them were at the same facility.

In 2015, after meeting people from a narcotics cartel, Pastuk smuggled cocaine from Las Vegas to Australia, earning $20,000. In 2015, along with Ali Taki Lalji, Pastuk recruited five colleagues at Vice media to smuggle $20 million of cocaine on the same route, however Australian immigration authorities arrested them. Vice Media, upon learning via letter about Pastuk's activities, fired him in 2016. In 2017, Pastuk was featured in the National Post article How a Former Editor Allegedly Used Vice Canada to Recruit Drug Mules for a Global Smuggling Ring.

He moved to Montreal, where he operated a clandestine dispensary before being arrested and put on house arrest in Brampton, Ontario. He was arrested by the Royal Canadian Mounted Police in January 2019, along with co-conspirator Ali Taki Lalji. In December 2019, Ontario Court Justice Heather Pringle sentenced him to nine years in prison.

In 2020, his drug exploits were the subject of Canadaland's podcast Cool Mules. In 2021, with support from Brian Whitney, he wrote Bad Trips: How I Went from Vice Reporter to International Drug Smuggler while in jail. The book was published in 2022, and has been optioned for a scripted TV series. In 2026, it was reported that a film based on Pastuk’s exploits was in development, with Matt Johnson directing.

He was denied full parole at his April 2022 parole hearing with the panel noting his "narcissistic traits and a rather enlarged ego". But he was granted release into the community as part of his day parole guidelines.

== Selected publications ==
- Bro's and Hoes in Prose, Self-Published, January 2011
- Donald Glover: Fear and Trembling, Vice Media, October 2013
- Forced Exposure Video Series, Vice Media, January 2016
- Bad Trips: How I Went from Vice Reporter to International Drug Smuggler, 2022.
