= Terry O'Reilly (broadcaster) =

Canadian broadcaster

O'Reilly in 2017

Terry O'Reilly and Mike Tennant talk about The Age of Persuasion on Bookbits radio.

Terry O'Reilly (born July 7, 1959 in Sudbury, Ontario) is a Canadian broadcast producer and radio personality best known as host of the CBC Radio One series O'Reilly on Advertising, The Age of Persuasion and Under the Influence, which examine the cultural and sociological impact of advertising and marketing on modern life.

== Career ==
A graduate of Ryerson Polytechnical Institute, he began his career as an advertising copywriter in radio, and later launched his own radio and television advertising production company, Pirate Radio and Television, in 1990. All three of his CBC Radio series and podcasts were independently produced for the network through Pirate until 2018.

With his Age of Persuasion co-producer Mike Tennant, he published the book The Age of Persuasion: How Marketing Ate Our Culture in 2009. In 2017, O'Reilly published his second book This I Know: Marketing Lessons from Under the Influence, a collection of marketing insights and tips to help small to medium-sized companies that can't afford a high-priced advertising agency.

In 2021 he published My Best Mistake: Epic Fails and Silver Linings, a book about the lessons people in business learned from failures which had the effect of setting up their later successes. The book was a National Business Book Award finalist in 2022.
