= The Maple =

Canadian online news publication

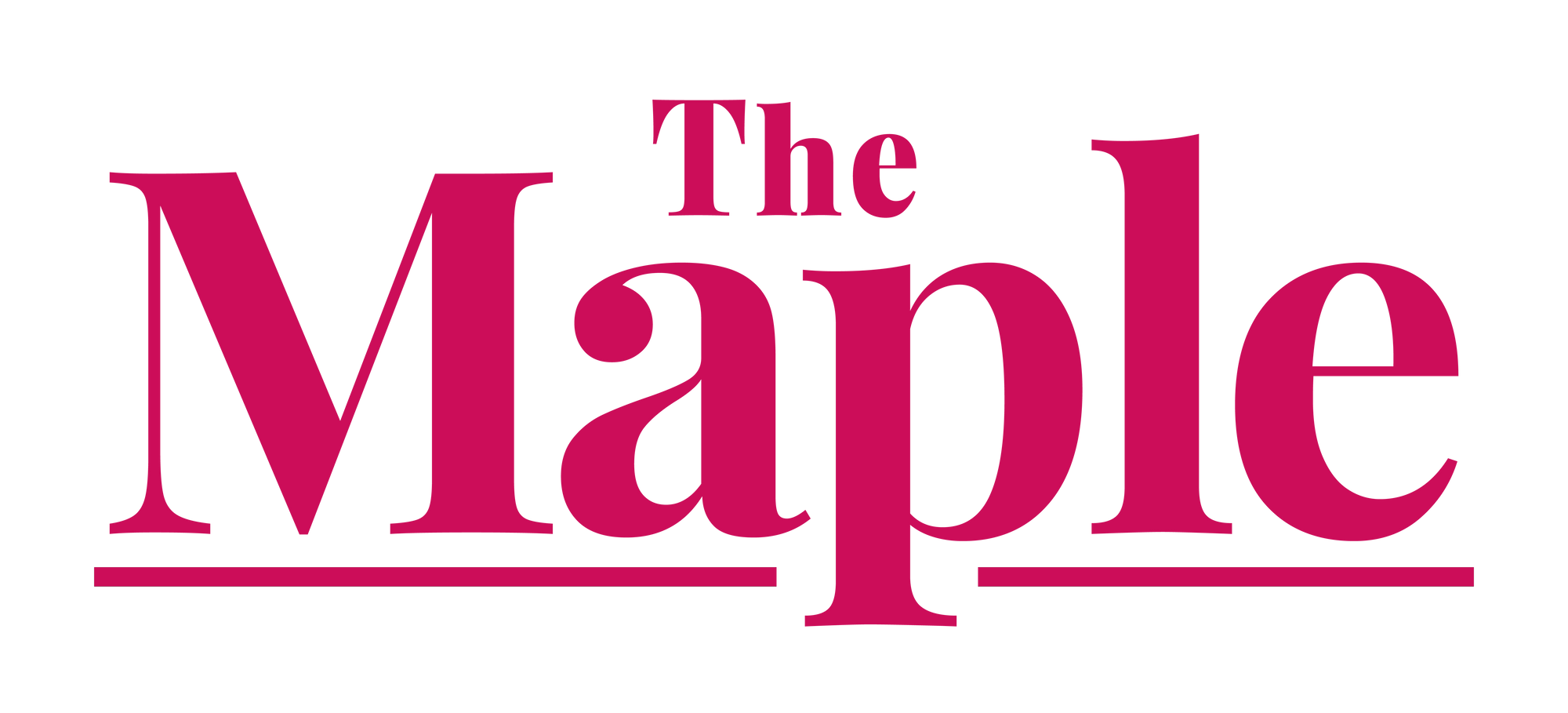
- Type: News website
- News editor: Alex Cosh
- Opinion editor: Davide Mastracci
- Founded: 2021; 5 years ago
- Website: www.readthemaple.com

The Maple is an independent, left-wing (Note: Sources characterizing The Maple as left-wing:) Canadian online news publication launched in 2021. The Maple was included in a list of independent Canadian news publications by The Griffins' Nest, a high school newspaper in Vancouver, in December 2021.

== History ==
In 2017, The Maple began as nonprofit North99, a social media-led campaign that sought to provide a platform for working class issues in Canada.

North99 transitioned to The Maple in 2021. In March 2023, The Maple merged with progressive publication Passage.

== Political alignment ==
The Maple is a left-wing publication. It has been characterised as anti-Zionist by The Atlantic, and by The Media Line as being "known for left-leaning investigative reporting".

News editor Alex Cosh said The Maple's core audience consists of people who seek "radically critical perspectives, not just on the Conservative and Liberal Parties, but also on the New Democratic Party (NDP) and other institutional organizations that purport to speak to left-wing and progressive values."

The managing editor for The Maple's opinion section is Davide Mastracci, who was previously an associate opinion editor at HuffPost Canada. Mastracci has previously written for Canada's National Observer, Vice News, Al Jazeera America and The Electronic Intifada. Mastracci has written about the Israel lobby in Canada, and has been sceptical of reports about rising antisemitism during the Gaza war. He has advocated for freedom of speech on the Gaza war protests. He is critical of Israel and has characterised its actions as a "planned genocide in Gaza".

== Coverage ==
The Maple has extensively covered right-wing media in Canada, as well as the Gaza war.

In March 2023, The Maple reported that Harjit Sajjan had been briefed to lobby Qatari ministers for a light-armored vehicle deal during the 2022 FIFA World Cup in Qatar. The story was subsequently picked up by The Globe and Mail.

In 2026, The Maple published a list of Canadian journalists who had taken sponsored trips to Israel paid for by the pro-Israel nonprofit the Exigent Foundation.

=== Canadian IDF soldiers ===
In 2025, The Maple published a list of 85 Canadian citizens who served in the Israel Defense Forces (IDF). The Maple subsequently published Find IDF Soldiers, a database of Canadians in the IDF, compiled using publicly available information. The website does not accuse the people listed of committing war crimes or breaking Canadian law, and states it does not encourage harassment.

The publication of Find IDF Soldiers was condemned by Paul Hirschson, Israel's consul-general in Montreal. Several members of the list campaigned for the website to be shut down. In June 2025, the Royal Canadian Mounted Police (RCMP) announced an investigation into "matters related to the Israel-Hamas armed conflict", with a possibility of exposing "a perpetrator of core international crimes — such as genocide, war crimes, or crimes against humanity."

In early 2026, The Maple published "GTA [Greater Toronto Area] to IDF", a database of "GTA institutions associated with Canadians who served in Israel's military". The Israel Law Center subsequently advocated for online payment provider Stripe to revoke access to The Maple's website.
