= Mark Bourrie =

Canadian historian, journalist, and lawyer

Mark Bourrie is a Canadian lawyer, author, and journalist. He has worked as a contract lecturer at Concordia University, Carleton University and the University of Ottawa. In 2020, his biography of Pierre-Esprit Radisson, Bush Runner: The Adventures of Pierre-Esprit Radisson, won the RBC Taylor Prize for literary non-fiction.

== Education ==
Bourrie graduated with a Bachelor of Arts in History from the University of Waterloo. He also holds a diploma in public policy and administration from the University of Guelph, a master's degree in journalism from Carleton University, a doctorate in Canadian media history from the University of Ottawa, and a law degree in from the University of Ottawa. He is a member of the Ontario bar.

Bourrie's PhD thesis was on Canada's World War II press censorship system and was published by Douglas & McIntyre as "The Fog of War".

== Career ==
He worked for two decades as a freelance journalist and feature writer, primarily for The Globe and Mail from 1981 to 1989 and the Toronto Star from 1989 to 1999 and sporadically since then, and maintained a blog. He was Parliamentary correspondent for the Law Times from 1994 until 2006. He also wrote for the InterPress Service, the United Nations-sponsored news and feature service. By the late 1990s, he had branched out from newspaper freelance work to book and magazine writing. He won a 1999 National Magazine Award gold award for his Ottawa City Magazine article, "The System That Killed Santa" and the Ontario Community Newspaper Association's award for 2007 Columnist of the Year for his work in the Ottawa City Journal.

From 2006 to 2009, Bourrie was a lecturer at Concordia University teaching journalism and media studies. Bourrie became a contract lecturer in Carleton University's history department and the University of Ottawa's Canadian studies department. He was also a member of Canada's Parliamentary Press Gallery and an expert and author on propaganda and censorship.

From approximately 2010 through April 2012, Bourrie wrote for Xinhua News Agency, an agency of the government of the People's Republic of China. Bourrie stated in August 2012 that Xinhua had asked him to collect information on the Dalai Lama by exploiting his journalistic access to the Parliament of Canada, leading Bourrie to resign from his position at Xinhua.

In 2021, Bourrie was the lawyer retained by Ottawa Life Magazine to defend against a defamation lawsuit filed by then Ottawa Police Service chief Peter Sloly. Sloly alleged that an article published by the magazine falsely and maliciously painted him as mismanaging misogyny problems within the force.

== Personal life ==
Bourrie is originally from the North Simcoe area of Ontario. He is married to Marion Van de Wetering, a federal government lawyer, and they have three children. Bourrie is a trilobite collector.

== Books ==
Bourrie has written several non-fiction books. The Globe and Mail described Bush Runner: The Adventures of Pierre-Esprit Radisson, his biography of French fur trader and adventurer Pierre Radisson, as "a significant contribution to the history of 17th-century North America". The book won the RBC Taylor Prize for non-fiction in 2020, the last time the prize was awarded. It was also nominated for the City of Ottawa Book Prize for non-fiction and was a Globe and Mail Top 100 book of 2019.

Big Men Fear Me, a biography of Globe and Mail founder George McCullagh, was longlisted for the National Business Book Award, shortlisted for the City of Ottawa Book Award in English, and nominated for the Toronto Heritage Book Award.

In a review of Bourrie's 2024 book Crosses in the Sky: Jean de Brebeuf and the Destruction of Huronia published in The Globe and Mail, historian Charlotte Gray wrote: "Bourrie has done more than any other Canadian historian writing for a general audience to disinter the root causes of degenerating settler-Indigenous relations and disrupted Indigenous societies in the 400 years since Brébeuf’s death. And he has done it with attention-grabbing panache. Crosses in the Sky is reliable history and would make a stirring movie."

In October 2025, Crosses in the Sky was shortlisted for the J.W. Dafoe Book Prize for best Canadian history book of 2024.

In 2025, the publication of Bourrie's Ripper: The Making of Pierre Poilievre, a biography of Conservative Party of Canada leader Pierre Poilievre coincided with the 2025 Canadian federal election campaign, receiving favourable reviews. The book was rushed into publication, several months ahead of schedule, due to the early election call. The book reached No. 2 on the Globe and Mail bestseller list. Tyee writer Michael Harris wrote: "This book is a phenomenal effort, carefully researched and nicely written. Ripper should be widely read by everyone who cares about the value of casting an informed vote on April 28."

=== Bibliography ===
- Chicago of the North. Annan and Sons, 1993.
- Ninety Fathoms Down: Canadian Stories of the Great Lakes. Toronto: Dundurn, 1995.
- Canada's Parliament Buildings. Toronto: Dundurn, 1996.
- By Reason of Insanity: The David Michael Krueger Story. Toronto: Dundurn, 1997.
- Flim Flam: Canada's Greatest Frauds, Scams, and Con Artists. Toronto: Dundurn, 1998.
- Parliament. Toronto: Key Porter, 1999. (preface to Malak Karsh's photo essay on Parliament Hill)
- Hemp: A Short History of the Most Misunderstood Plant and Its Uses and Abuses. Toronto: Key Porter, 2001.
- True Canadian Stories of the Great Lakes. Toronto: Key Porter/Prospero, 2005.
- Many a Midnight Ship: True Stories of Great Lakes Shipwrecks. Ann Arbor: University of Michigan Press/Toronto: Key Porter, 2005.
- The Fog of War: Censorship of Canada's Media in World War II. Vancouver, Douglas & McIntyre, 2011.
- Fighting Words: Canada's Best War Reporting. Toronto: Dundurn, 2012
- Kill the Messengers: Stephen Harper's Assault on Your Right to Know. Toronto: HarperCollins Canada, 2015
- Peter Woodcock: Canada's Youngest Serial Killer. R.J. Parker, 2016
- The Killing Game: Martyrdom, Murder and the Lure of ISIS. Toronto: HarperCollins Canada, 2016. Translated into Romanian as ISIS. Jocul Mortii. cORINT, 2016
- Bush Runner: The Adventures of Pierre-Esprit Radisson. Windsor: Biblioasis, 2019
- Big Men Fear Me. Biblioasis, 2022
- Fundamental Law for Journalists. Irwin Law, 2023
- Crosses in the Sky: Jean de Brebeuf and the Destruction of Huronia. Biblioasis, 2024
- Ripper: The Making of Pierre Poilievre. Biblioasis, 2025

== See also ==
- List of University of Waterloo people
