= The Night Time Podcast =

Investigative journalism podcast

The Nighttime Podcast
- Genre: Investigative journalism; Interview
- Language: English

Production
- Length: Variable (5–120 minutes)

Technical specifications
- Audio format: Podcast (via streaming or downloadable MP3)

Publication
- Original release: October 30, 2015

The Nighttime Podcast was an investigative journalism and interview podcast that dealt with missing persons, mystery and the paranormal, often specializing in stories from the East Coast of Canada. Although it primarily covers topics from The Maritime Provinces of Canada, many episodes deal with missing people or mysteries from outside the region.

== Brand infringement retaliation by the Subject of “the Story of the Glove Guy” ==
On February 10th and 11th of 2019, The Nighttime Podcast released a two-part series titled “GloveGuy”, which investigated reports of males in the Halifax area being offered rides from a driver who would pressure them into trying on a series of tight leather gloves. They described the situation as one that was increasingly uncomfortable, and in at least one case, resulted in criminal charges.

Upon the series’ release, the subject of the episodes (who was referred to on air as “the Glove Guy”) began a trademark infringement and cyber squatting campaign in retaliation, leading to a national news story.

The Nighttime Podcast has not addressed the situation on air, however in a post on their official Facebook page, they stated that "[GloveGuy’s] claim to ownership of Nighttime is absurd and laughable" and that "I am pursuing a remedy via a variety of agencies and am confident that this will be resolved without any complications".

Nighttime's handling of this series and the subsequent retaliation has led to them being named The Last Podcast on the Left's "Hero of the Week" in their Sept 4, 2019 episode.
