= Canadaland =

Canadian news site and podcast network

- Canadaland podcast artwork
- Type: Private
- Founded: 2013
- Founder: Jesse Brown
- Headquarters: Toronto, Canada
- Key people: Jesse Brown (Owner and publisher and CEO and editor-in-chief and producer and host and writer); Noor Azrieh (host)
- Products: Canadaland (podcast)
- Website: www.canadaland.com

Canadaland is a Canadian podcast founded by Jesse Brown.

The podcast began with a focus on media criticism and later transitioned to commentary on political issues and current affairs more broadly. Canadaland currently airs four days a week. It is hosted three days a week by Brown and once a week by Noor Azrieh.

At one time, the company produced other weekly or monthly podcasts covering a range of topics. As of 2024, only the flagship show, Canadaland, remained.

== History ==
The podcast began in the fall of 2013 as a one-person project by Jesse Brown, focused on media criticism. Brown was a co-founder of Bitstrips, and also worked as a media hoaxster and a humour columnist, before launching a career as a media critic. By 2015, Canadaland had expanded into a small podcast network covering entertainment and some news.

In February 2014, Canadaland reported that CBC anchor Peter Mansbridge had been paid by the Canadian Association of Petroleum Producers (CAPP) to speak at a 2012 event, raising concerns about a conflict of interest given The National’s coverage of the oil sands. The story was picked up by The Huffington Post, Vice, sparked public debate, and prompted an investigation by CBC's Ombudsperson, who found that Mansbridge had not broken any rules but cautioned reporters about the optics of accepting money from groups likely to appear in the news. In April 2014, CBC tightened its rules on paid speaking engagements.

In May 2023, Brown decided to step back from the editor-in-chief role and Karyn Pugliese, a veteran journalist, was named the new editor-in-chief of Canadaland. An Algonquin journalist from Pikwàkanagàn, she is known for her leadership at APTN, CBC's investigative unit, and the Assembly of First Nations. A past president of the Canadian Association of Journalists, she is also a press freedom advocate.

In October 2023, after the October 7 attacks, Brown intensified his social media activity, focusing on pro-Palestine protests and antisemitism in Canada. He also published statements on his X account and website criticizing female journalists who questioned the scale of Israel's retaliation against Palestinian civilians. This triggered the Canadaland Union to publish a letter on behalf of unionized and non-unionized employees, stating that Brown had “published a series of misleading and targeted statements through both personal and official channels” that undermined journalistic standards. The Union letter recognized that Brown's stated intentions were to bring attention to antisemitism but "The manner in which he's done this has been irresponsible." Brown faced additional backlash for his perceived stance on the Israeli-Palestinian conflict, estimating a 9% loss in Canadaland's supporters during this period.

In October 2024, Brown edited an interview on a show hosted by award-winning journalist Justin Ling, despite Ling's objections. The edits included the removal of a statement linking Canada's arms sales to Israel to Palestinian deaths, and cutting the word "genocide." While Ling and his guest called the edits political, Brown defended them as improvements. The dispute led to the resignation of the host, Pugliese as editor-in-chief, and several other staff. Brown later confirmed he insisted on final approval of all company content and reclaimed the editor-in-chief position for himself.

That same month, Brown interviewed the Israeli Ambassador to Canada Iddo Moed about antisemitism in Canada. The podcast contained factual errors, which Brown left uncorrected. His remaining staff later published a 3,000-word analysis highlighting inaccuracies and lack of context.

In October 2025 Brown launched a six-hour podcast series tracing the rise of antisemitism in Canada through protests against Israel, following the October 7 attacks and Israel's responding attacks on Gaza. Brown worked on the podcast with his wife Kate Minsky, and journalist Michael Fraiman. In an interview about his series, on the podcast Quillette, Brown finally gave some insight into his political beliefs on the war, itself, when he stated he believed it was open to debate if the Israeli state had committed apartheid or genocide.

In April 2026, PressProgress reported that Brown was banned from Reddit after securing temporary moderator access to r/Canadaland to investigate anonymous users who had criticized him, the podcast and staff members including Sam Konnert, Noor Azrieh and Julian Abraham, who discussed their anger about the criticism on Canadaland’s own podcast. Brown admitted to 'spear phishing' reddit accounts that criticized him and staff, and sending IP-tracking links to lawyer and author Mark Bourrie, but denied sending the same phishing links to other journalists who also reported receiving them. Although Canadaland obtained a number of IP addresses, the effort failed to identify any of its anonymous critics.

On October 8, 2026, Jesse Brown announced that he would step down as host of Canadaland’s flagship podcast while remaining editor and publisher, shifting his reporting and commentary to what he called “the Palestine issue.” His plans included a new investigative podcast about anti-Zionism, which he has described as a “hate movement.” In his commentary, Brown has linked pro-Palestinian and anti-Zionist activism to antisemitism and argued that government concessions to protesters have worsened harm toward Canadian Jews.

== Funding ==
The company's main revenue streams are on-air advertisements and, since 2014, direct crowdfunding. Canadaland publishes an annual transparency report that details their finances.

The company's 2017–2018 annual fundraising campaign included an appeal by Ryan McMahon to launch a new investigative podcast called Thunder Bay. The campaign proved successful, surpassing their "funding threshold".

== Current podcasts ==
=== CANADALAND (podcast) ===
The original eponymous podcast is described as the "flagship" show of the podcast network. The show publishes five times a week, often hosted by Jesse Brown and a guest who discuss news and current events. Noor Azrieh also hosts one a week.

== Former shows ==
The Canadaland podcast network has produced a number of limited-run and ongoing shows over the years. Its longest-running series included Commons (2015–2024), a documentary-style podcast examining systemic issues in Canada such as policing, real estate, mining, and the war in Afghanistan. Originally hosted by Desmond Cole and Andray Domise, the show was later hosted by Arshy Mann and ran in themed seasons.

Another widely known series was Thunder Bay (2018, with follow-ups in 2020 and 2023), hosted by Ryan McMahon. The podcast expanded on the work of Toronto Star reporter Tanya Talaga’s Seven Fallen Feathers, about systemic racism in the city of Thunder Bay.

Other Canadaland podcasts included The Backbench (2019–2024), a political round table hosted initially by Fatima Syed and later by Mattea Roach; Wag the Doug (2018–2024), about Ontario Premier Doug Ford hosted by Allison Smith and Jonathan Goldsbie. Additional shows over the years included OPPO (2018–2021), and The Imposter (2016–2020), DDx (2018), which was branded content, Taste Buds (2018), Détours, (2022- 2024) and canadaLANDBACK (2022-23)

The network also produced several limited-series podcasts, including Cool Mules (2020) by Kasia Mychajlowycz and The Newfoundlander (2023).

Two other series The White Saviors (2021) which focused on activities by WE Charity, and Ratfucker (2022), about a conservative political operative, led to litigation against Canadaland. The White Saviors was a six-part podcast series narrated by Olusola Adeogun. The series focused on activities by WE Charity and the WE Charity Scandal including interviews with whistleblowers and former staff.

== Theresa Kielburger vs. Canadaland Inc. ==
In November 2021, Theresa Kielburger, a retired Toronto schoolteacher and mother of WE Charity founders Craig and Marc Kielburger, filed a defamation lawsuit against Canadaland Inc. and its proprietor Jesse Brown, seeking $3 million in damages. The lawsuit disputes claims in a Canadaland podcast called "The White Saviors Canadaland. True Crime" which was first aired August 23, 2021.

The central focus of the lawsuit was Canadaland's characterization of a 1997 lawsuit involving her son Craig Kielburger and Saturday Night magazine from the previous year, which resulted in a judicial condemnation and settlement of $319,000 against the magazine. The author of the Saturday Night piece, Isabel Vincent, had claimed that in 1995 Theresa Kielburger deposited $150,000 in donations from the Ontario Federation of Labour into her family bank account. This claim, which both Ms. Kielburger and the Ontario Federation of Labour flatly denied, was presented in Canadaland's podcast, according to the lawsuit, in a manner meant to suggest that Theresa Kielburger had stolen the money. Prior to the airing of the podcast, Canadaland was served a statement of claim by Theresa Kielburger. Ms. Kielburger's lawsuit stated that Canadaland was aware that this claim was false, but repeated it anyway.

Brown accused WE Charity of mounting a public relations campaign against it, telling podcast listeners that “#JesseBrownLies was briefly the number one trending topic in Kenya" and complained that several American media organizations had called Canadaland "fake news". Brown said that he was “confident that this lawsuit will be dismissed."

In May 2024, Ontario Superior Court Justice Edward Morgan denied Brown and Canadaland's bid to dismiss the lawsuit on the basis of Anti-SLAPP legislation, finding instead that Ms. Kielburger's claims had "substantial merit" and setting the case on track to go to trial. Justice Morgan ruled Brown did not give Theresa Kielburger a chance to respond to allegations about her in the podcast. Morgan found no evidence that Brown or Canadaland had any valid defence for the willful omission of relevant information or for what he called a "callous disregard" for Ms. Kielburger's reputation. Morgan found that Canadaland's podcast repeated the earlier libel as a central theme of its podcast after ignoring information provided by her accountant and by the Ontario Federation of Labor, and wrote, “For Canadaland to have left this important point out of its story undermines any factual objectivity that the broadcast may claim." Morgan wrote, "The fact that he was speaking about the plaintiff, and imposing personal pain on the plaintiff by repeating an allegation about her that he was aware had been seriously contested, if not established as entirely false, was seen by him as irrelevant." The judge said Brown's explanation for not contacting Mrs. Kielburger showed, in Brown's eyes, "the Plaintiff's (Mrs. Kielburger's) feelings are worth nothing." The judge went on to say, "The cynicism of Brown's explanation not only accentuates the defamatory sting of his words, but could be considered high handed and oppressive." Justice Morgan said Brown had written proof that the allegations he made about Mrs. Kielburger were false, and the judge ordered the case to move forward to trial.

While ruling that the trial against Brown and Canadaland should go forward, Morgan found that Saturday Night (magazine)'s reporter Isabel Vincent, who was interviewed for the podcast, lacked sufficient involvement to be held liable for Canadaland's behavior.

According to Peter Downard, partner at Fasken, counsel for the plaintiff and one of three members of the Attorney General of Ontario's advisory panel which drafted Ontario's anti-SLAPP legislation, Canadaland's attempt to dismiss Ms. Kielburger's claim is an example of how the legislation he helped to draft, meant to protect whistleblowers against corporate power, is being misused. The law, he explained, was meant to quickly dismiss frivolous claims rather than adjudicate factually and legally complex cases such as Kielburger vs. Canadaland Inc.

Brown and Canadaland claimed three potential valid defences, each of which was rejected by the court. The first was that their statements constituted a "fair and accurate report" of proceedings in the Saturday Night case, but the court found that Canadaland's claims went beyond what was in them.

The second potential defence was that of "responsible communication," meaning that Canadaland had to demonstrate that it exercised due diligence in determining the facts and reported them responsibly. The court found that Canadaland failed this test by not contacting Ms. Kielburger to learn what had actually happened. Lenczner Slaght partner William McDowell commented, "You have to actually do your best to figure out whether the allegation is true or not." When Justice Morgan asked Brown why Canadaland had denied Ms. Kielburger the opportunity to respond to its allegations, Brown responded that he "did not seek comment [from the plaintiff] for the same reason why I didn't seek comment from my own mother: neither of them were involved.”

Finally, Brown and Canadaland claimed that their reporting qualified as "fair comment" on a matter of public interest, which would be protected by law. The court rejected this on the ground that fair comment is a matter of opinion rather than an assertion of fact, and that the evidence suggested that Canadaland's facts were likely untrue.

On June 9, 2026, Jesse Brown and Canadaland settled the lawsuit for $775,000. In addition to $110,000 which was ordered following the court's denial of Brown's anti-SLAPP motion., this was one of the largest defamation settlements involving a Canadian media outlet.

Speaking in an open session of the Ontario Superior Court, Brown retracted Canadaland's allegations and apologized to Theresa Kielburger for its false reporting, saying, "This was unfounded. We were wrong to have published it. Canadaland wholly retracts its statement about Ms. Kielburger. We apologize unreservedly to her for the harm caused by our publication of it".

As part of the settlement, Brown's retraction and apology would prominently and permanently appear on Canadaland's website and on every platform where the offending podcast can be found, and an audio of the retraction would be inserted into the podcast itself wherever it appears. Justice William Chalmers approved the settlement, calling it "reasonable and in the best interest of Theresa Kielburger".

Following the hearing, Brown wrote by email, "Theresa Kielburger had nothing to apologize for, and that’s why I apologized to her today".

Theresa Kielburger said, "Jesse Brown broadcast his lies to his audience and beyond. He said what he said in public, without ever calling me for comment in advance. The apology belongs in public too". Kielburger said that Brown's false reporting harmed not only herself, but also youths who had raised funds for WE Charity.

WE Charity in a press release said, "It was a foundational allegation on which Canadaland built its broader thesis that the Kielburger family had personally and improperly benefited from WE Charity. That claim is now formally retracted".

== Wenzel vs Canadaland. ==
Canadaland settled a defamation lawsuit in 2024 involving Calgary homebuilders Shane and Edith Wenzel. The case originated from the podcast "Ratfuckers". The Wenzels dropped the lawsuit after Canadaland agreed to issue a correction to the original story.

Brown offered corrections and an apology for aspects of Canadaland's earlier coverage of the Steven Galloway case in the October 14, 2026 episode of Short Cuts, amid Galloway's defamation trial against individuals who circulated sexual-assault allegations that he denies.

== Book: The Canadaland Guide to Canada ==
In her review of Jesse Brown's 2017 book The Canadaland Guide to Canada, author Charlotte Gray described Jesse Brown as a "crowdfunded media critic and self-described 'public irritant'". Gray cited Brown in describing Canada as "shapeless, beige haze," that we created and that "it's time we grew up and told the truth."

== Critical reception ==
In an article in the Times Colonist, Mike Devlin described Brown as the "controversial host of the popular Canadaland podcast and crowdfunded news site." Devlin wrote that Brown was "polarizing...mostly because of his irreverent critiques and smart-ass attitude" whose "media and cultural critiques" are handled in a "gloves-off manner." According to Devlin, Brown became "something of a bad boy in Ontario" for attacking Canadian media "sacred cows" such as The Globe and Mail. In his 2014 article in The Walrus, Brown described how guest journalists were originally reluctant to appear on the program until it gained credibility following the February 2014 Mansbridge exposé.

According to Brown, Canadaland's podcasts had reached 100,000 weekly listeners by late 2018.

The Globe and Mail's Simon Houpt compared Brown to an "action star in a Hollywood blow-'em-up: throwing fireballs and kicking asses" but added "he has a track record of playing fast and loose with facts".

In the Toronto Life review of Toronto's most "addictive podcasts" in 2016, Vibhu Gairola, included Canadaland. Gairola wrote that "Unless you're a journalist, you probably know Canadaland as that podcast that broke the Ghomeshi scandal". While Canadaland self-described as a "non-sensationalist watchdog and a flag bearer for responsible reporting", Brown is known for routinely challeng[ing] and condemn[ing] the big names in Canadian news." Gairola compared Canadaland to "earnest whistle-blowing of TVO's The Agenda With Steve Paikin or HBO's Real Time with Bill Maher.

National Post's Christie Blatchford wrote that Canadaland's 2017 fake obituary by Indigenous journalist and activist Robert Jago on Canadaland's website, of the Post's founder, former publisher, columnist, and Blatchford's former employer—Conrad Black—was "vicious", "petty and unfunny."

== See also ==
- List of Canadian podcasts
