= Steve Rawlins =

American composer and arranger

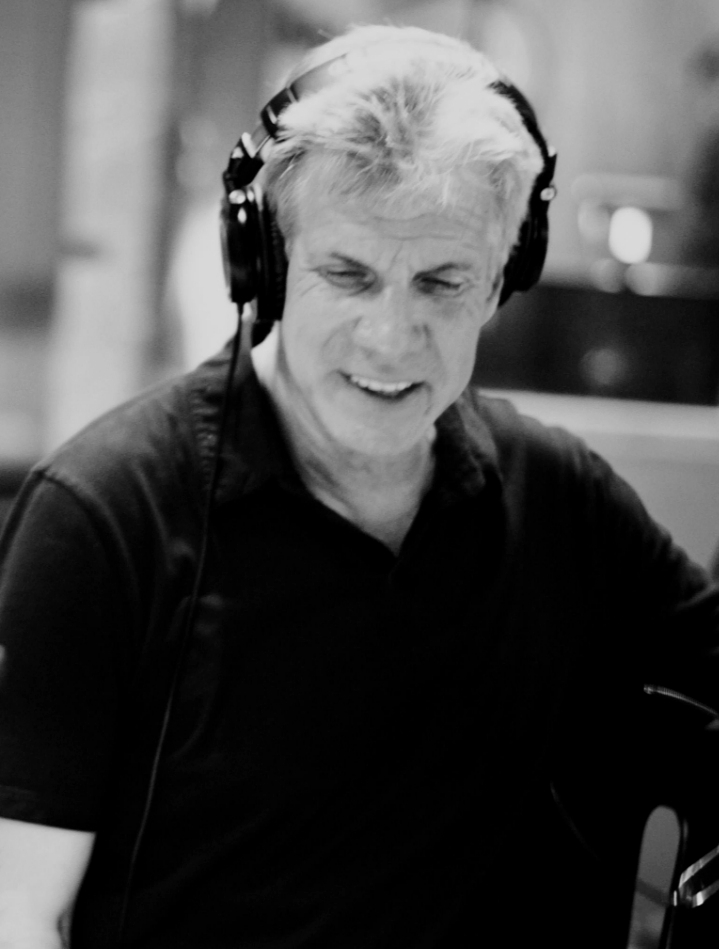
- Rawlins in Recording Studio, 2015
- Born: Steven Jeffrey Rawitz; September 5, 1954 (age 71); Mineola, New York, U.S.
- Occupations: Musician; Arranger; Composer; Musical Director; Music Producer; Author
- Years active: 1972–present
- Spouses: Michele Delon (m. 1993; div. 1994) Isela Sotelo (m. 1978; div. 1989)
- Children: 2
- Musical career
- Genres: Pop; Jazz; Soul
- Instrument: Piano
- Labels: Motown; London Records; Sea Breeze Records
- Website: steverawlins.com

Steve Rawlins is an American musician, composer, arranger, musical director, and author. He has arranged music for a wide range of recording artists, including Smokey Robinson, Bette Midler, Chaka Khan, Anna Danes, and Lainie Kazan. He produced the single Angelito (Angel Baby), recorded by Isela Sotelo on Motown Latino Records, which charted on Latin Billboard's Hot 100 in 1982.

He has arranged music for the Academy Awards and Emmy Award ceremonies, and for multiple television shows, including The Crazy Ones, 24, and Jeopardy!. Rawlins has performed throughout the U.S. and internationally including Carnegie Hall and the John F. Kennedy Center for the Performing Arts and served as music director for such artists as John O'Hurley, Lainie Kazan, Steve March-Tormé, Anna Danes, Shea Arender, and The Wonderful Wizard of Song-The Music of Harold Arlen.

== Early life ==
Steve Rawlins (born September 5, 1954) was born in Mineola, New York to parents Gloria (née Gluck) and Herbert Rawitz. His father was an aerospace engineer that worked on NASA's Project Gemini. Rawlins is the second born of three siblings. He began taking piano lessons at six years old and began playing the trumpet at nine years old and played both instruments consistently throughout his childhood.

He and his family relocated to Los Angeles, California in 1965 when Rawlins was eleven years old. His parents frequented live CBS variety television show tapings as a part of the audience and sat next to the orchestra which influenced Rawlins in choosing a career as a professional musician. He attended University High School (Los Angeles) where the school's big band singer was Lorna Luft (daughter of Judy Garland) and Rawlins wrote some of his earliest arrangements for her to sing. His music teacher John Magruder, (who played baritone saxophone with Don Ellis) mentored him in music arranging and career direction. He graduated high school in 1972.

While attending CSUN, (California State University at Northridge) Rawlins saw a notice on a bulletin board that composer/arranger Sammy Nestico was teaching a big band and was looking for musicians at nearby Pierce College. Rawlins joined the band for the next two years learning much from Nestico in advanced composition and orchestration techniques.

== Career ==
In 1974 Rawlins played keyboards with a top 40 band touring throughout Western Canada. Upon returning to Los Angeles in 1975 he began writing music for The Merv Griffin Show and was offered a position as a staff arranger and music librarian. Griffin's featured trumpet player, Jack Sheldon, introduced Rawlins to Benny Goodman to write arrangements that were featured in his 40th Anniversary Concert at Carnegie Hall.

In 1979, Rawlins was hired by John Davidson (entertainer) as an arranger at his John Davidson's Singer's Summer Camp (JDSSC) on Catalina Island then hired him to write for his show in Las Vegas and Rawlins went on to compose and arrange music for his The John Davidson Show, which aired for two years.

He continued to freelance as a musician, composer and arranger for various commercials, TV shows, and recording projects.

=== Isela Sotelo - Angelito (Angel Baby) - Motown Latino Records ===
Rawlins produced and arranged Isela Sotelo's radio charting single, Angelito (Angel Baby) released on Motown Latino Records which was earned a spot on the Billboard Hot 100 Latin music charts in 1982.

=== Step Right Up ===
Before the release of his album Step Right Up (released on Sea Breeze Records) in 1985, Rawitz decided to legally change his last name to Rawlins for the sake of easier pronunciation and spelling. The song, Laguna was played on radio stations throughout the U.S. and was in regular rotation on KTWV (94.7 The Wave) in Los Angeles in 1985.

=== Steve March-Tormé ===
Rawlins began working with Steve March-Tormé in 1996 as an arranger, composer, and pianist and continues to work with him. Rawlins co-wrote the title track, Swingin' at the Blue Moon Bar & Grille as well as arranged Straighten Up and Fly Right which March-Tormé recorded as a duet with his father, Mel Tormé.

== Discography ==
Year	Album	Artist	Credit
2019	The King Symphonic	Shea Arender/Las Vegas Symphony Orchestra	Arranger, Conductor
2019	The Romantic	Michael Tinholme	Arranger
2019	Lady Stardust	Michael Tinholme	Arranger
2019	August Afternoon	Claude Hall	Arranger, Piano
2017	Blue Smoke	Mary Bogue	Producer, Composer, Arranger, Piano
2017	One Night Of Sin	Mary Bogue	Producer, Arranger
2017	The Moonlight Sessions	Lyn Stanley	Arranger
2016	Once Upon a Time	Winston Byrd	Piano
2015	Interludes	Lyn Stanley	Arranger
2015	From The Start	Alistair Tober	Composer
2014	Potions	Lyn Stanley	Arranger
2013	Lost in Romance	Lyn Stanley	Producer, Arranger
2012	Don't Go To Strangers	Mary Bogue	Producer, Arranger, Piano
2012	That Old Feeling	Patrisha Thomson	Producer, Arranger, Piano
2011	Kiss of Brazil	Bianca Rossini	Composer, Keyboards
2009	Inside Out	Steve March Tormé	Arranger, Piano
2008	Last Call	Al Timss	Arranger, Piano
2007	So Far	Steve March Tormé	Producer, Composer, Arranger, Piano
2006	Standard Scotch	Scotch Ellis Loring	Piano
2005	Benzali	Daniel Benzali	Arranger, Piano
2003	A Night For Romance	George Bugatti	Arranger, Piano
2003	The Essence of Love	Steve March Tormé	Producer, Composer, Arranger, Piano
2001	Sunday Drive	Robert Kaufman	Producer, Composer, Arranger, Keyboards
2001	Queen of the Night	Ella Leya	Keyboards
2000	Buy Me A Martini	Sara Laporte	Producer, Composer, Arranger, Piano
2000	Live On the Strip	George Bugatti	Arranger
2000	The Night I Fell For You	Steve March Tormé	Producer, Composer, Arranger, Piano
1999	Swingin’ At The Blue Moon Bar and Grille	Steve March Tormé	Producer, Composer, Arranger
1998	Oh, What a Night For Love	George Bugatti	Arranger, Piano
1998	Hot Harmonica	Danny Welton	Arranger
1997	Summer in San Francisco	Danny Welton	Arranger
1992	Bruce Eskovitz	Bruce Eskovitz	Trumpet
1992	Time Will Tell	Grant Geissman	Composer
1991	Flying Colors	Grant Geissman	Composer
1988	Three Gals, Three Guitars	The Del Rubio Triplets	Trumpet
1986	Musica Ranchera and Rock and Roll	Isela Sotelo	Producer, Composer, Arranger, Piano, Trumpet
1985	Step Right Up	Steve Rawlins	Producer, Composer, Arranger, Trumpet
1983	Flip Wilson	Flip Wilson	Arranger, Trumpet
1982	Angel Baby (Angelito)	Isela Sotelo	Producer, Arranger, Piano
1978	40th Anniversary Concert (Live at Carnegie Hall)	Benny Goodman	Arranger
1977	Come Softly	Brenton Wood	Trumpet

== Film and television ==
Year	Film/TV	Credit	Studio/Production Company
2014	The Crazy Ones	Arranger	CBS
2012	Carol Channing: Larger than Life	Arranger	Dramatic Forces
2010	Arrested Development	Piano	Fox
2009	24	Arranger, Piano	Fox Television
2000	Star Trek: Voyager	On-Camera Musician, Piano Coach	Paramount
1998	All Dogs Go to Heaven: The Series	Arranger	MGM Television
1997	Family Matters	On-Camera Musician	CBS
1996	Phil Hartman NewsRadio	Arranger	NBC
1993	Jeopardy! College Championship	Arranger	King World Productions
1992	Class of the 20th Century	Arranger	A & E
1991	World War II- A Personal Journey	Arranger	Disney Channel
1988	"Viva"	Composer, Arranger	Syndicated Talk Show Theme
1987	This Is Your Life	Arranger	Ralph Edwards Productions
1983	Post	Composer, Arranger	Newsweek Television
1983	Super Bowl	Trumpet, Arranger	NBC
1982	Yes, Georgio	On-Camera Musician	MGM
1982	My Favorite Year	On-Camera Musician	MGM
1980-1982	The John Davidson Show	Composer, Arranger	Syndicated
1979	Real Life	On-Camera Musician	Paramount
1979	Los Angeles Film Critics Awards	Music Director, Arranger	Metromedia
1978	Charlie's Angels	Trumpet	ABC/Aaron Spelling Productions
1975-1978	The Merv Griffin Show	Staff Music Arranger, Music Librarian	Syndicated
1971	Pretty Maids All in a Row	On-Camera Musician	MGM

== Author ==
In 1995 while attending the NAMM Show Rawlins met John Haag, who was the president of Creative Concepts Publishing. Haag published Rawlins' How to Get Real with a Fake Book. Shortly thereafter Hal Leonard LLC bought out Creative Concepts Publishing and hired Haag as a consultant who oversaw the rest of Rawlins' Hal Leonard releases.

Year	Book	Topic	Publisher	Credit
2008	$2,000 Singers Resource Book	69 Custom Arrangements For Female Singers	Hal Leonard	Author
2006	Ready Tonight - Volume 1	Performance-Ready Female Vocals in Original Keys	Hal Leonard	Author
2006	Ready Tonight - Volume 2	Performance-Ready Female Vocals in Original Keys	Hal Leonard	Author
2006	Entertaining Easy Classics Volume 1 (Book/CD)	Easy Piano With Chord Symbols	Hal Leonard	Author
2006	Entertaining Easy Classics Volume 2	Easy Piano With Chord Symbols	Hal Leonard	Author
2004	Pro Charts in Original Keys: Volume 2	For Female Singers	Hal Leonard	Author
2004	Pro Charts in Original Keys: Volume 1	For Female Singers	Hal Leonard	Author
2003	Jazz Tracks for Singers	Men's Edition: Book/Audio with Jazz Trio Tracks	Hal Leonard	Author
2003	Jazz Tracks for Singers	Women's Edition: Book/Audio with Jazz Trio Tracks	Hal Leonard	Author
2003	Jazz Ballads for Singers	Men's Edition: 15 Classic Standards in Custom Vocal Arrangements	Hal Leonard	Author
2003	Jazz Ballads for Singers	Women's Edition: 15 Classic Standards in Custom Vocal Arrangements	Hal Leonard	Author
2002	The Singer's Book of Jazz Standards	Women's Edition (Vocal Collection)	Hal Leonard	Author
2002	The Singer's Book of Jazz Standards	Men's Edition (Vocal Collection)	Hal Leonard	Author
2001	21 Bebop Exercises	For Vocalists and Instrumentalists	Hal Leonard	Author
1996	How to Get Real with a Fake Book: A Guide for the Piano Arranger	A Guide for the Piano Arranger	Hal Leonard	Author
