= Hal March =

American actor, comedian and game show host (1920-1970)

- Born: Harold Mendelson; April 22, 1920
- Died: January 19, 1970 (aged 49); Los Angeles, California, U.S.
- Occupations: Actor; comedian; television host
- Years active: 1944–1969
- Spouse: Candy Toxton (m. 1956)
- Children: 3
- Relatives: Hunter March (grandson)

Hal March (born Harold Mendelson; April 22, 1920 – January 19, 1970) was an American comedian, actor, and television quiz show emcee.

== Early career ==
March entered show business as a straight man in the vaudeville act the Hollywood Rioteers, before serving in the U.S. Army beginning in 1941. He began his career in broadcasting as an announcer at Station KYA in San Francisco. From 1944 through 1948 he teamed with comedy partner Bob Sweeney in The Bob Sweeney-Hal March Show on CBS Radio. He also appeared in The Adventures of Sam Spade, which ran on CBS from 1946 to 1949.

March co-starred as Harry Morton on The George Burns and Gracie Allen Show on the NBC and CBS radio networks from the mid-1940s until 1950. When the show switched to television that year, he continued in the role until the middle of the season, in 1951. During the next few seasons, he appeared occasionally in various guest roles on the show.

March and Mary Jane Croft co-starred in Too Many Cooks, a summer replacement program on CBS radio in 1950. The comedy centered on Douglas and Carrie Cook and their 10 children.

He went on to appear on such shows as The Imogene Coca Show, I Love Lucy, and Willy. In the summer of 1955, March joined John Dehner and Tom D'Andrea in the 11-episode NBC summer series, The Soldiers, a military comedy produced and directed by Bud Yorkin. D'Andrea temporarily left the William Bendix sitcom The Life of Riley for this chance at his own series.

He was the Mystery Guest on the October 9, 1955, episode of What's My Line? He was guessed by Bennett Cerf.

== The $64,000 Question ==
March was arguably best known as the host of The $64,000 Question, which he helmed from 1955 to 1958. In addition to his hosting duties, March also sang a version of the show's theme music in 1956, titled "Love Is the Sixty-Four Thousand Dollar Question."

As a result of the quiz show scandals, the show was canceled, and with the exception of a few film roles such as Hear Me Good and Send Me No Flowers, March was largely out of work for nearly a decade.

== Later career ==
To keep busy, March continued to appear in guest-starring roles, even starring in a 1961 unsold television pilot for a comedy titled I Married a Dog, in which his life was constantly upset by his wife's pooch. He appeared in several sitcoms in 1966 that are still widely rerun today. Among these are a role as the father of Gidget's boyfriend Jeff in the Gidget episode "In and Out with the In-Laws" and the head of corrupt dance studio in The Monkees episode "Dance Monkee, Dance." He also made appearances in the sitcoms Hey, Landlord and The Lucy Show as well as in the film A Guide for the Married Man.

In 1961, he played the lead in Neil Simon's first Broadway play, Come Blow Your Horn, which ran for 677 performances.

== Death ==
March's career took a turn for the better in July 1969 when he began hosting the game show It's Your Bet. After completing approximately 13 weeks of taping, however, he complained of exhaustion. Tests revealed that he had lung cancer, the result of years of chain smoking. He had one lung removed. When he subsequently contracted pneumonia, he was too weak to fight it. March died in January 1970 in Los Angeles at age 49, and is buried in Hillside Memorial Park Cemetery.

== Accolades ==
March was awarded two stars on the Hollywood Walk of Fame: one for his radio work at 1560 Vine Street, and another for his work in television at 6536 Hollywood Boulevard.

== Personal life ==
In 1956, March married Candy Toxton, the former wife of singer Mel Tormé. March was stepfather to Toxton's two children from her previous marriage, Steve March-Tormé and Melissa Tormé. He and Toxton had three children together: Peter, Jeffrey, and Victoria.

His grandson Hunter March hosted the game show Emogenius. He also hosts the Netflix series Sugar Rush, E! TV's Nightly Pop, and the Netflix mobile game show Best Guess Live.

== Filmography ==
Year	Title	Role	Notes
1949	Champion	Mobster	Uncredited
1949	The Story of Molly X	Max Hayden	Uncredited
1950	Ma and Pa Kettle Go to Town	Detective Mike Eskow	
1950	Outrage	Detective Sergeant Hendrix	
1953	Combat Squad	Henry Gordon	
1953	The Eddie Cantor Story	Gus Edwards	
1954	Yankee Pasha	Hassan Sendar	
1954	The Atomic Kid	Agent Ray	
1955	It's Always Fair Weather	Rocky Heldon	Uncredited
1955	My Sister Eileen	Pete - First Drunk	
1957	Hear Me Good	Marty Holland	
1964	Send Me No Flowers	Winston Burr	
1967	A Guide for the Married Man	Technical Adviser (Man who loses coat)	

== Television ==
Year	Title	Role	Notes
1950	The George Burns and Gracie Allen Show	Harry Morton	Regular, Episodes 1–7, Oct 12 – Dec 28, 1950
1957	The Jack Benny Program	Himself	S8:E3, "Hal March Show" October 20, 1957
1966	The Monkees	Renaldo	S1:E14, "Dance, Monkee, Dance"
