= Hunter March =

American television host, actor, producer, and comedian

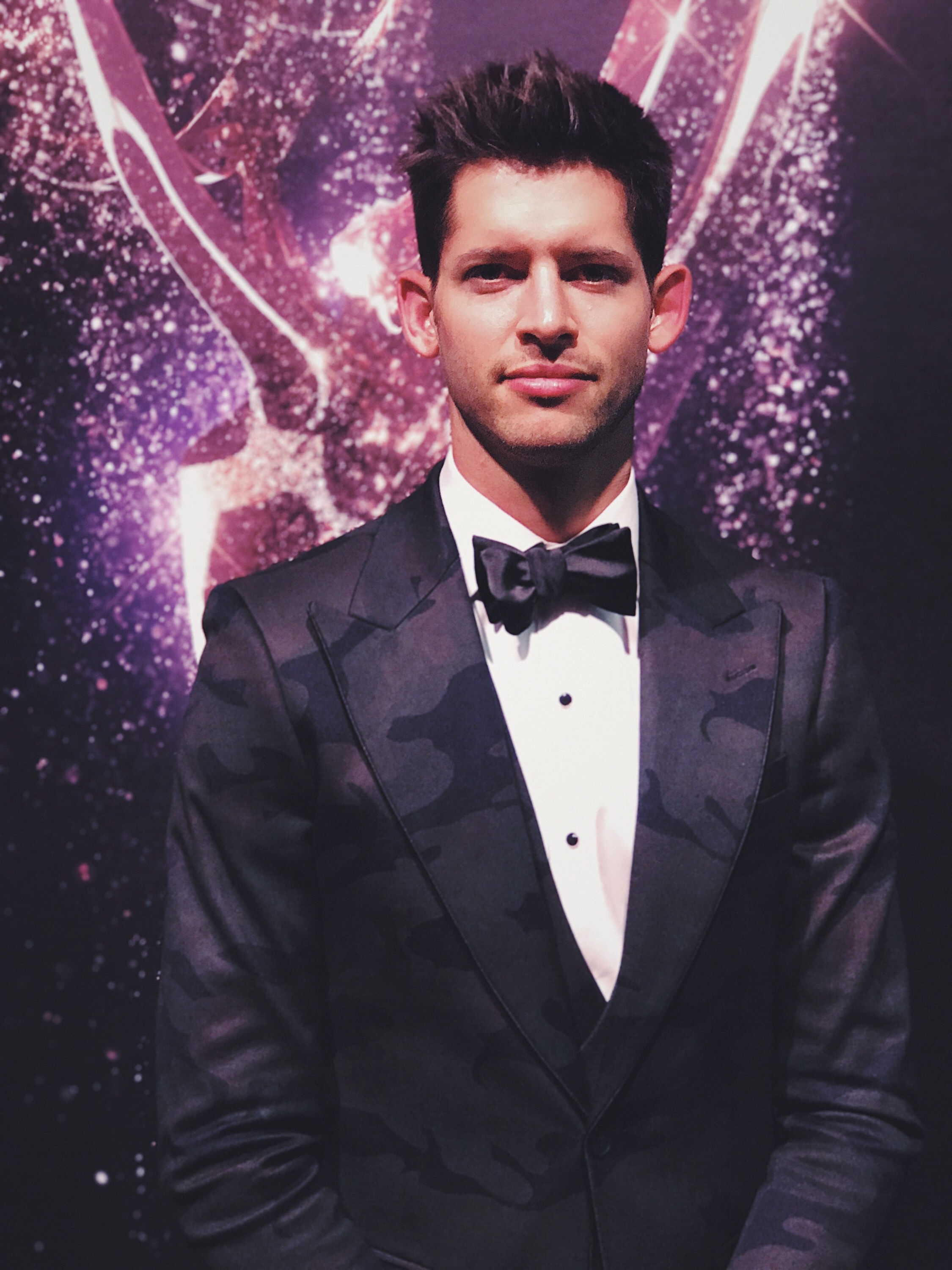
- Born: April 5, 1991 (age 35); Los Angeles, California, U.S.
- Occupations: Comedian, actor, television host, producer
- Years active: 2012–present
- Known for: Sugar Rush; Nightly Pop
- Relatives: Hal March (grandfather); Candy Toxton (grandmother)

Hunter March (born April 5, 1991) is an American television host, actor, producer, and comedian best known for his work as the host of Sugar Rush on Netflix, Nightly Pop on E!, and Emogenius on Game Show Network.

== Early life ==
Hunter March was born on April 5, 1991. He is the grandson of actress Candy Toxton, and Hal March, the former host of the game show The $64,000 Question.

== Career ==
=== AwesomenessTV ===
March joined AwesomenessTV as an intern in 2012, near the inception of the company and was promoted to producer and then on-camera host, becoming one of the early faces of the company. March hosted and produced up to ten videos a week for AwesomenessTV. He has been the permanent host of the Daily Report for over five years.

In 2015 and 2016, March hosted Top Five Live, AwesomenessTV's larger-budget daily live talk show for Verizon/Go90.

=== Game show career ===
March was the host of Emogenius on Game Show Network, which aired from 2017 to 2018.

=== E!'s Nightly Pop ===
March was also the co-host of the E! late-night show Nightly Pop. The show went on for 650 episodes over the course of four years before being cancelled on August 26, 2022, which concluded its final airing in October.

=== Netflix's Sugar Rush ===
In July 2018, Netflix premiered its newest culinary competition show Sugar Rush, of which March was the host. In the show, judges Candace Nelson and Adriano Zumbo, along with a special celebrity guest judge that varied between episodes, judge teams of top bakers for a grand prize of $10,000 in each episode.

=== Netflix's Blown Away ===
In early 2023, March signed on to host the fourth season of Netflix's Blown Away, a glassblowing competition series.

=== Author ===
In 2017, March released TBH: 51 True Story Collabs, a self-help book for teens, published by Scholastic, featuring stories contributed by 24 different major influencers, including Rebecca Black, Alex Aiono, and Jenn McAllister. For every book sold, Scholastic is donating a book to the Pajama Program.
