= Steve March-Tormé =

American writer

Steve March Torme
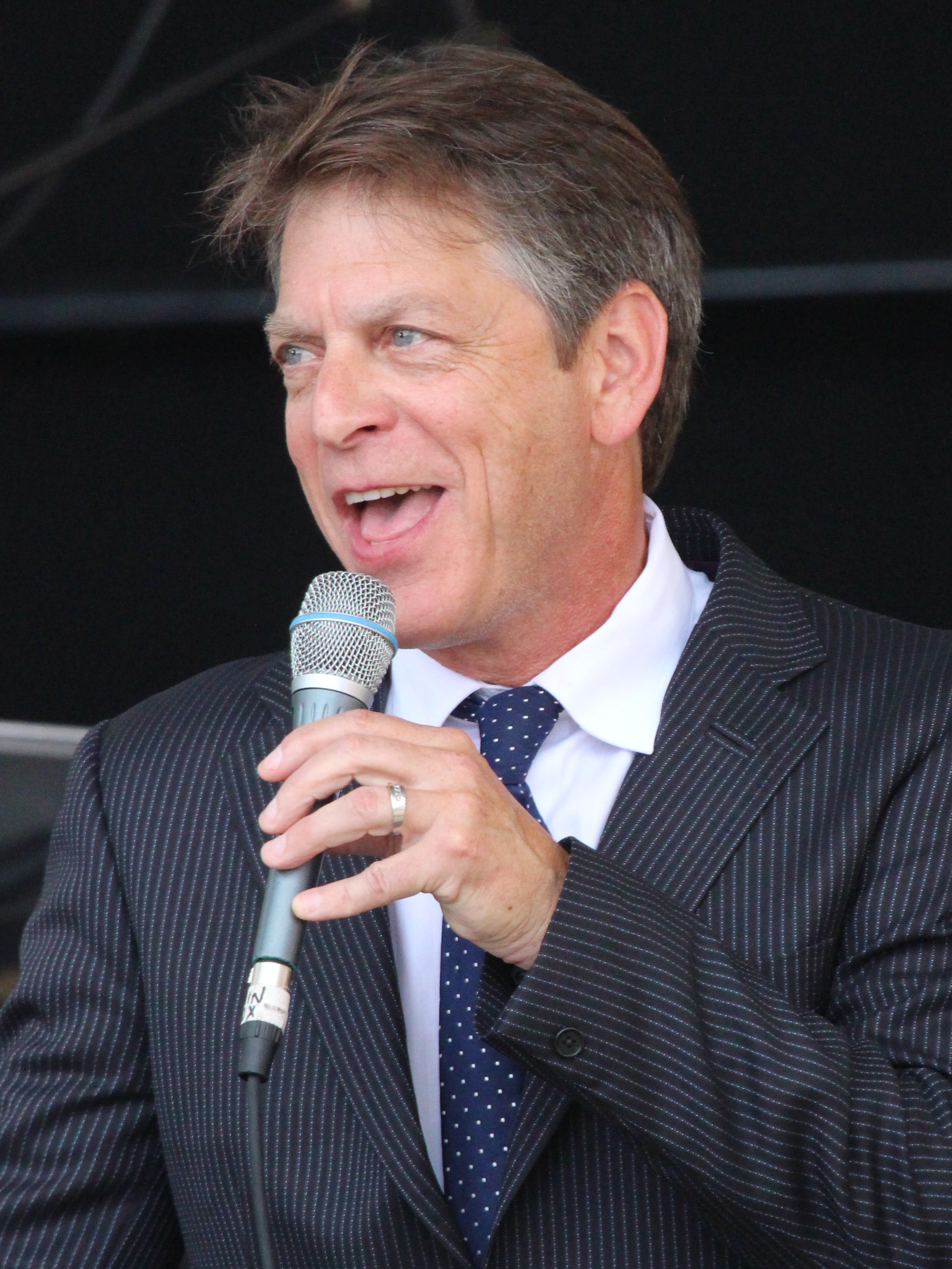
- March-Tormé at the 2014 Detroit Jazz Festival

Background information
- Born: January 29, 1953 (age 73); New York City, New York, U.S.
- Genres: Jazz, pop
- Occupations: Musician, actor, radio host
- Instruments: Piano, guitar
- Years active: 1966–present
- Website: www.stevemarchtorme.com

Steve March-Tormé (born January 29, 1953) is an American singer/actor/songwriter and radio host. He is the son of the singer Mel Tormé and actress Candy Toxton. They divorced, and Toxton married actor/comedian Hal March, who became Steve's stepfather.

Apart from his father, March-Tormé's early musical influences include The Four Seasons, Nat King Cole, The Temptations, Ricky Nelson, and Gene Pitney. Later influences include Joni Mitchell, James Taylor, Todd Rundgren, Steely Dan, and The Beatles.

== Biography ==
=== Early life ===
Steve Tormé was born on January 29, 1953, in New York City to Mel Tormé and the former model Candy Toxton. His parents divorced in 1956. He has a half-sister, Daisy, an actress/singer, and a half-brother, James, a singer, through Mel Tormé's marriage to British actress Janette Scott. He has another half brother Tracy, a writer through Mel's marriage to Arlene Miles. In 1956, Candy Toxton married actor/comedian Hal March, who was the host of The $64,000 Question game show, and starred in Neil Simon's Come Blow Your Horn on Broadway. Hal March became stepfather to Steve and Melissa, who changed her surname to Tormé-March. Steve eventually welcomed three more half siblings: Peter, Jeffrey and Tori March.

Steve March-Tormé spent much of his childhood playing baseball and listening to New York Yankees games on the radio. After games he would turn to Top 40 music stations and sing with The Four Seasons, Nat King Cole, The Temptations, Ricky Nelson, Gene Pitney, and The Beatles. At 13 he led his first band.

After March and Toxton moved to Beverly Hills, California, March-Tormé formed friendships with Desi Arnaz Jr., Dean Martin Jr., Miguel Ferrer, Carrie Fisher, and Liza Minnelli while attending high school. During this time, he continued to develop as a musician and his influences grew to include Joni Mitchell, James Taylor, Todd Rundgren and Steely Dan, all of whom March-Tormé pays homage to on his 2009 album Inside/Out. After his stepfather's death in 1970, March-Tormé rekindled his relationship with his father Mel Tormé, who occasionally recorded and appeared with March-Tormé in concert until his death in 1999.

=== Career ===
In the late 1970s, March-Tormé recorded his first LP, Lucky, for United Artists Records. The album included Arthur Adams, Wilton Felder and Wayne Henderson of the Jazz Crusaders, Fred Tackett and Paul Barrere of Little Feat, Jimmy Gordon from Derek and the Dominos, Max Bennett, Chuck Findley, Victor Feldman, Plas Johnson, and Pete Christlieb. After returning to California, he produced and sang on Liza Minnelli's album Tropical Nights.

March-Tormé was the lead male singer on the syndicated game show The $100,000 Name That Tune from 1978 to 1981. His audition consisted of singing Elton John's "Daniel" and Stevie Wonder's "My Cherie Amour" for the producers, who hired March-Tormé the next day. The new version of the show was more of a game show/variety musical hybrid, with two bands playing the notes or songs the contestants would have to guess. One was a big band led by Stan Worth and the second was a rock band led by March-Tormé and dubbed Dan Sawyer and the Sound System. March-Tormé hosted the Los Angeles TV program Cinemattractions in 1989, which became Box Office America in 1990. He also hosted Video 22 from 1985–1986.

In 1982, March-Tormé was invited by jazz critic Leonard Feather to audition for a vocal group started by his daughter Lorraine Feather and her friend Charlotte Crossley. When told that recommendation had come from Quincy Jones (who had seen March-Tormé perform at a tribute show to Henry Mancini at the Hollywood Bowl) and that the album would be produced by Richard Perry, March-Tormé went to the offices of Planet Records to sing "Serenade in Blue" and "Blue Suede Shoes" for Richard and his partner, movie producer Joel Silver. He was hired as the solo male voice in the trio 'Full Swing'. After the debut album Full Swing was recorded at Planet Records in Hollywood, it was followed by tours of Brazil and Japan. Full Swing included Paulinho Da Costa, Paul Jackson Jr., Victor Feldman, Chuck Findley, Gary Grant, Dick "Slide" Hyde, Tom Scott, David Benoit, Jerry Hey, Conte Candoli, Lew McCreary, Richard Tee, Vinnie Colaiuta, and Russ Kunkel. Four musicians from this recording (Gary Herbig, Ira Newborn, Joel Peskin, and Pete Christlieb) would later work with March-Tormé on his solo albums. As a member of 'Full Swing', he sang with his father at the Kool Jazz Festival at Carnegie Hall.

After Richard Perry sold Planet Records in 1983, March-Tormé pursued a solo career. He played the male lead in the Italian TV musical-drama Molly O for RAI Television. During the 1990s he performed in clubs and theaters in the U.S., including Catalina's, Feinstein's, At My Place, and The Jazz Bakery. He also went on tour in Canada. In 2000 he performed at Feinstein's in New York City, the Dakota Jazz Club in Minneapolis, and the Hollywood Bowl, where he paid tribute to his father. In 2001 he performed with the Palm Beach Pops in Florida and at the Gene Harris Jazz Festival in Boise, Idaho. In 2006 AIX Records released the CD and DVD Tormé Sings Tormé, which won Best Vocal Dual Disc at the EMX DVD Awards show in Los Angeles.

In 2009, March-Tormé recorded his album Inside/Out for the Go Daddy label. This was his first pop album since Lucky. Music and lyrics were written by March-Tormé and features him playing keyboards and guitar for the first time since Lucky. He has worked often with pianist Steve Rawlins, who accompanies him on stage and has played piano and arranged songs for Tormé's recordings. They have co-written many of the songs on Torme's jazz albums.

March-Tormé tours worldwide in a jazz trio, a big band, a dek-tette titled Tormé Sings Tormé, and a symphony for a show titled 'From Broadway to Bernstein, From Mercer to Mel'. He has performed in 46 of the 50 states in addition to Australia, Canada, Japan, Brazil, England, and Italy. For the last ten years, he has hosted three separate radio shows on 91.1 FM.

== Discography ==
- Lucky (United Artists, 1977)
- Tropical Nights (Liza Minnelli album on Columbia Records, 1977. producer, arrabger and guest vocalist.)
- The Good Times Are Back (as the male vocal of the "Full Swing" trio) (Planet Records, 1982)
- Swingin' at the Blue Moon Bar and Grill (Frozen Rope, 1999)
- The Night I Fell for You (Frozen Rope, 2000)
- The Essence of Love (Frozen Rope, 2003)
- Tormé Sings Tormé (AIX Records, 2006)
- So Far (Steve March-Tormé, 2007)
- Inside/Out (Go Daddy Music, 2009)
