= Lily Fong =

Lily Fong was the first Chinese-American elementary school teacher in Las Vegas and first to sit on the Nevada State board of regents. At the age of 52 she worked for education in Las Vegas and build Las Vegas businesses in Las Vegas with her husband Wing Fong.

== Early life and background ==
Lily was born in Superior, Arizona on June 17, 1925 to Helen and Ong Chen Hing. Helen was born in Scranton, Pennsylvania, but went to China in 1903 where she lived until she was married to Ong Chun Hing. They got Married in a traditional Buddhist ceremony. Ong got immigrated to the United States in the 1912 and in 1921 he established a branch of the American Kitchen restaurant in Superior which was a half restaurant and half grocery store.

After Lily Fong was born, in 1930 her mom Helen took her and her siblings to China to take care of her ailing mother. Lily was 5 years old and she spent 7 years in China where she began her education. When the war in Japan began, in the 1937, Lily’s Father brought her family back to Arizona. As Lily grew up, she went to school and earned her college degree and graduated from Arizona State University in Tempe. She then met her husband, Wing Fong who was a student at Woodbury College was California and they got married in 1950.

Lily and Wing, made their home in Las Vegas where the husband became a manager for the Las Vegas Bottling Co. Later on they opened Fong’s Gardens Restaurant that became a favorite eating establishment for local residents. Wing also became active in banking and real estate.

After Lily moved to Las Vegas with her husband Wing, she applied for a teaching position with the Clark County School District but her application was rejected for no stated reason,even when she was qualified with a degree from Arizona State University and prior teaching experience in Southern California. Lily didn't give up, she appealed directly to the school district's Board of Trustees, and because of her appealing impression to the Board Trustees, they voted to approve her application to teach. The School District Board of Trustees then directed the superintendent to hire Lily as an elementary school teacher at the Fifth Street School and then later she taught at West Charleston School. In 1952, this made her the first Asian American elementary school teacher in Nevada. Lily taught until 1955 and she offered to teach Chinese language classes to any student that wanted to learn Chinese on Saturdays. As her family life grew from 1955-1970, Lily and her husband Wing became involved in business and the Las Vegas community. She didn't lose her passion for education, she saw that UNLV needed to grow at the time, she then worked hard to raise millions of dollars in funding and donation over the year for University of Nevada, Las Vegas. In the process she also convinced major donors, like Judy Bayley and Artemus Ham Jr., to contribute. which let to building the Judy Bayley Theatre and the Artemus Ham Hall at UNLV.

== Career and impact on Las Vegas community ==
Fong Began her professional career as a teacher in the Clark County School District, becoming the first Asian American hired for the district. She taught at Fifth Street Elementary and West Charleston schools, and in 1952 was recognized as an outstanding teacher in the Clark County School District. Her early work in education laid the foundation for her lifelong commitment to expanding opportunities for students in Nevada.

In 1974, Fong was elected to the University and Community College System of Nevada Board of Regents, where she served ten until 1985. As a regent, she worked to secure alternative funding sources for high education and supported the establishment of scholarship funds and academic programs. Her efforts contributed to the growth of the University of Nevada, Las Vegas during a period of rapid expansion. in recognition of her contributions, the Lily Fong Geoscience Building at UNLV was named in her honor since she played a key role in raising $3 million for the university.

=== Civic engagement ===
Beyond her formal roles in education, Lily Fong was deeply involved in the community and civic organizations. She served as state president of the American Association of University Women and as education vice chairwoman of the Nevada Governor's Commission on the Status of Women. She also served on the boards of the Las Vegas Symphony and Opportunity Village, and was a member of the U.S. small Business Advisory Council. Fong and her husband contributed financially and through service to numerous local causes, reflecting their belief in giving back to the community.

== Legacy ==
Lily Fong's Legacy in Las Vegas is preserved through educational institutions that include her name, including the Wing and Lily Fong Elementary School in Las Vegas and the Lily Fong Geoscience building at UNLV. Her contributions helped expand educational access and strengthened community institutions in Southern Nevada, leaving a lasting impact on the region.
