= Daily Pop =

American daytime talk show

- Also known as: E! Daily Pop
- Directed by: Fred Mendes
- Starring: Justin Sylvester; Loni Love; Kym Whitley
- Country of origin: United States
- No. of seasons: 4
- No. of episodes: 888

Production
- Executive producer: Jennifer Lavin
- Production location: NBCUniversal/Comcast
- Camera setup: Multi-camera
- Running time: 60 minutes

Original release
- Network: E!
- Release: May 1, 2017 – September 9, 2022

Related
- Nightly Pop

E! Daily Pop is an American daytime talk show that airs on E!. It premiered on May 1, 2017.

== Premise ==
The show covers pop culture and celebrity news.

== Cast ==
Catt Sadler, Carissa Culiner, and Justin Sylvester were the original hosts when the show premiered.

Sadler left in December 2017 after a pay dispute between herself and fellow co-host Jason Kennedy.

Morgan Stewart started making frequent appearances in early 2018 and later became a full-time host. Stewart also previously appeared on the E! reality series Rich Kids of Beverly Hills.

Culiner left the show on May 5, 2021.

Stewart announced she left the show to focus on hosting Nightly Pop on June 13, 2022.

== Production ==
The show premiered on May 1, 2017. The second season premiered on January 1, 2018.

A second talk show, Nightly Pop, premiered on October 29, 2018. Morgan Stewart stars in the show alongside Hunter March and Nina Parker.

The third season premiered on January 2, 2019.

On March 13, 2020, it was announced that starting on March 16, the show would go on hiatus due to the COVID-19 pandemic. The show returned in a pre-taped half-hour format on May 11, 2020, with the hosts broadcasting from home. The show resumed airing live on July 6 while still broadcasting remotely. The show returned to the studio in September 2020, this time sharing a studio with Nightly Pop and Access Hollywood.

On August 26, 2022, It was announced that the show is cancelled and will end production in mid-September. with its last episode air on September 9.
