= Sugar Rush (2018 TV series) =

- Also known as: Sugar Rush: Extra Sweet (season 3)
- Genre: Reality competition
- Directed by: Ariel Boles
- Presented by: Hunter March
- Judges: Candace Nelson; Adriano Zumbo
- Composer: Robert ToTeras
- Country of origin: United States
- Original language: English
- No. of seasons: 3 (+2 holiday seasons)
- No. of episodes: 32

Production
- Executive producers: Doneen Arquines; Dan Cutforth; Casey Kriley; Jane Lipsitz; Candace Nelson; Andrew Wallace
- Cinematography: Burke Heffner

Original release
- Network: Netflix
- Release: July 13, 2018 – November 27, 2020

Sugar Rush is an American baking reality television series, released on Netflix on July 13, 2018. The series features four professional teams of two competing in a baking competition for a prize of $10,000. Teams of two bakers compete in three rounds. Round one is cupcakes, round two is confections, and round three is cake. The third season, dubbed Sugar Rush: Extra Sweet, is the series' first spin-off season, where if a team wins either a cupcake or confection challenge, they can choose either an additional 15-minute time in the final cake challenge or a $1,500 prize.

== Cast ==
Sugar Rush is hosted by Hunter March and judged by professional chefs Candace Nelson and Adriano Zumbo, along with a different guest judge each episode.

== Production ==
Sugar Rush is managed by Magical Elves production company. The company is also known for producing shows like Top Chef and Nailed It!. This Netflix original series is filmed in Hollywood, Los Angeles, California. The set is located at the Sunset Bronson Studio where it is filmed.

== Episodes ==
Season	Episodes	Originally released
1	8	July 13, 2018
2	6	July 26, 2019
Christmas 1	6	November 29, 2019
3	6	July 31, 2020
Christmas 2	6	November 27, 2020

=== Season 1 (2018) ===
No. overall	No. in season	Title	Guest judge	Winning Team	Original release date
1	1	"Surprise!"	Nancy Silverton	Vivian & Samantha	July 13, 2018
2	2	"Kids in a Candy Store"	Jonathan Grahm	Briana & Chandtelle	July 13, 2018
3	3	"Holiday Celebrations"	Thiago Silva	Peri & Jennifer	July 13, 2018
4	4	"Cake by the Ocean"	Richard Blais	Jennifer & Rebecca	July 13, 2018
5	5	"Sweet Geeks"	Colin Hanks	Amir & Dennis	July 13, 2018
6	6	"Camp Sugar Rush"	Michael Showalter	Alan & Anna	July 13, 2018
7	7	"Frosted Fashion"	Betsey Johnson	Blaque & Patty	July 13, 2018
8	8	"Get Buzzed"	Mindy Segal	Ben & Amber	July 13, 2018

=== Season 2 (2019) ===
No. overall	No. in season	Title	Guest judge	Winning Team	Original release date
9	1	"Trending Treats"	Jackie Sorkin	Abbia & Shayla	July 26, 2019
10	2	"Light My Fire"	Irene Choi	Maria & Kasey	July 26, 2019
11	3	"Family That Bakes Together"	Carla Hall	Andrew & Sarah	July 26, 2019
12	4	"All Things Chocolate"	Jacques Torres	Victoria & Ali	July 26, 2019
13	5	"Made With Love"	Nick Lachey and Vanessa Minnillo	Sarah & Cole	July 26, 2019
14	6	"Science of Sweets"	Paris Berelc	Zac & Corey	July 26, 2019

=== Season 3: Extra Sweet (2020) ===
No. overall	No. in season	Title	Guest judge	Winning Team	Original release date
21	1	"Junk Foodie"	Fortune Feimster	Nixon & Cori	July 31, 2020
22	2	"Birds of a Feather"	Naya Rivera (Note: Rivera died in a drowning accident a few weeks before the episode aired. Netflix announced Rivera's involvement on the day before the season was released, adding that the episode would be shown as originally planned. It includes a dedication to the actress.)	Andre & Deborah	July 31, 2020
23	3	"Perfect Illusion"	Justin Willman	Tom & Caty	July 31, 2020
24	4	"Blackout"	Tyler Posey	Hollyanne & Marianne	July 31, 2020
25	5	"Tropical Vacation"	Garcelle Beauvais	Chuck & Tom	July 31, 2020
26	6	"Breakfast, Lunch, and Dinner"	Ron Ben-Israel	Ginnie & Jon	July 31, 2020

=== Christmas: Season 1 (2019) ===
No. overall	No. in season	Title	Guest judge	Winning Team	Original release date
15	1	"Christmas Spirit"	Liza Koshy	Caitlyn & Sabrina	November 29, 2019
16	2	"O Christmas Tree"	Amirah Kassem	Kevin & Mayra	November 29, 2019
17	3	"Christmas Carols"	Donal Skehan	Jackie & Rachel	November 29, 2019
18	4	"The Nutcracker Sweet"	Jeanine Mason	Christina & Tasha	November 29, 2019
19	5	"Here Comes Santa Claus"	Tiffani Thiessen	Diane & Toni	November 29, 2019
20	6	"Winter Wonderland"	Meryl Davis	Katlin & Jim	November 29, 2019

=== Christmas: Season 2 (2020) ===
No. overall	No. in season	Title	Guest judge	Winning Team	Original release date
27	1	"A Sugar Rush Christmas (Note: The theme of the episode was dedicated to A Charlie Brown Christmas, and Snoopy makes an appearance on the first round)"	Adam Rippon	Sheyna & Shari	November 27, 2020
28	2	"Christmas Countdown"	Chris Bosh	Jon & Ana	November 27, 2020
29	3	"Gift Exchange"	Valerie Gordon	Katie & Anthony	November 27, 2020
30	4	"North Pole"	Sasha Pieterse	Jordan & Jenna	November 27, 2020
31	5	"Songs of the Season"	Jordin Sparks	Julian & Hector	November 27, 2020
32	6	"Deck the Halls"	Abigail Breslin	Maddie & Alex	November 27, 2020
