= Filter (social media) =

Effects used to alter an image's appearance

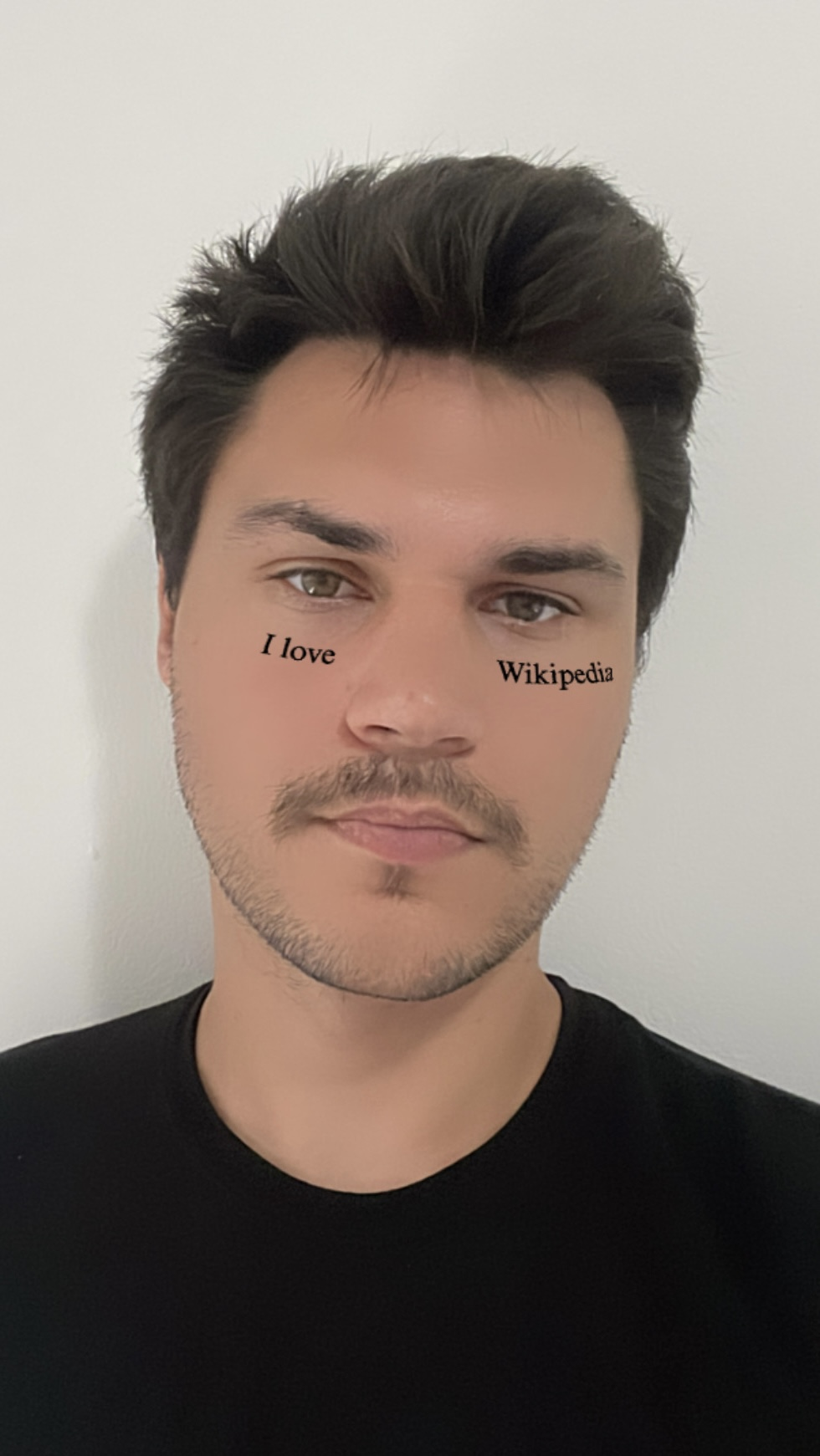
A selfie taken by a man using an "I love Wikipedia" social media camera filter

Filters are digital image effects often used on social media. They initially simulated the effects of camera filters, and they have since developed with facial recognition technology and computer-generated augmented reality. Social media filters—especially beauty filters—are often used to alter the appearance of selfies taken on smartphones or other similar devices. While filters are commonly associated with beauty enhancement and feature alterations, there is a wide range of filters that have different functions. From adjusting photo tones to using face animations and interactive elements, users have access to a range of tools. These filters allow users to enhance photos and allow room for creative expression and fun interactions with digital content.

== History ==
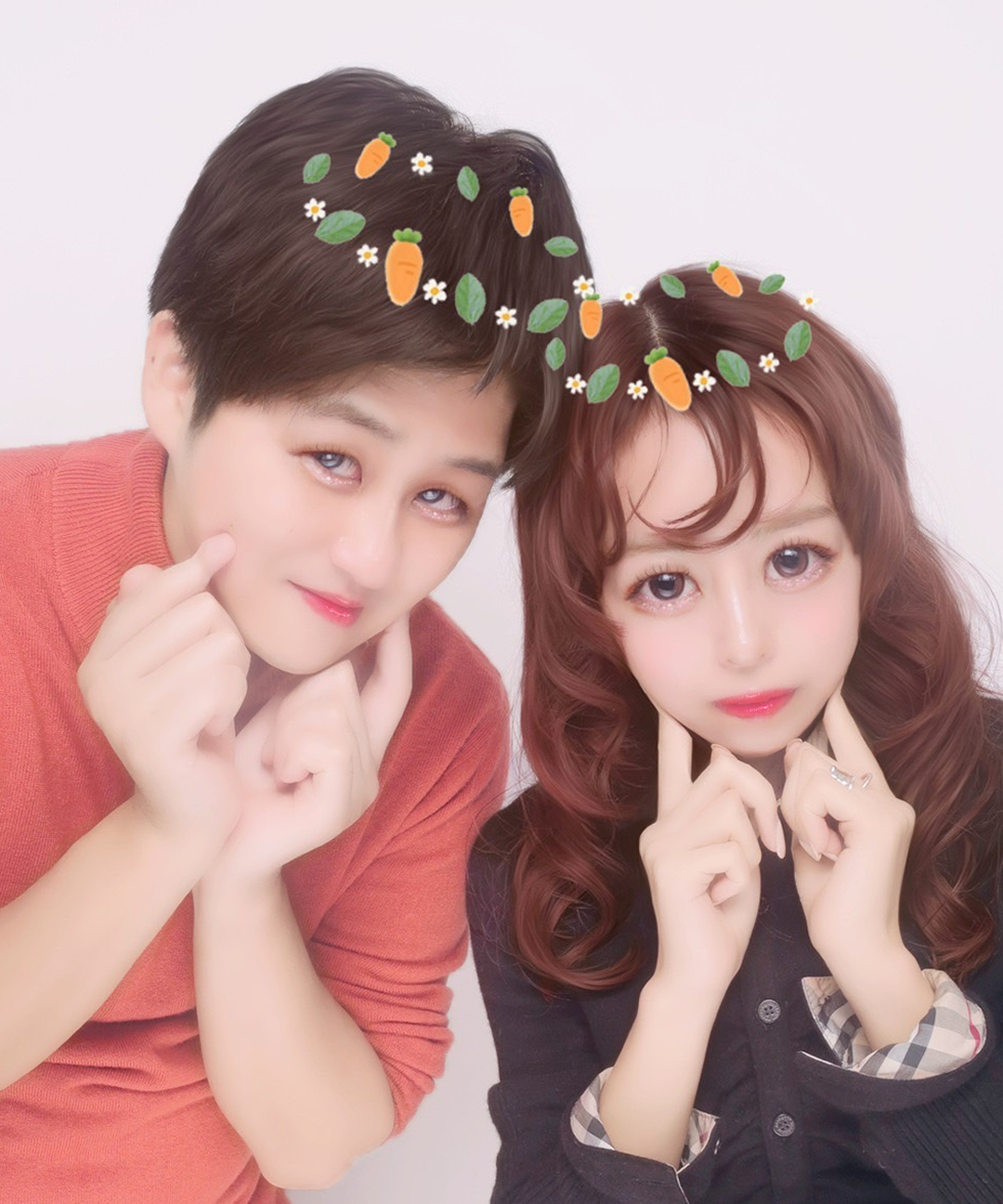
Photo sticker with beauty filter and various effects from a Purikura machine

Beauty filters originate from Purikura ("print club"), a type of Japanese photographic arcade game machine conceived in 1994 by Sasaki Miho, a female employee at Atlus, and released in 1995 by Atlus and Sega primarily for female visitors at Japanese arcades. They allowed the manipulation of digital selfie photos with kawaii beauty filters similar to later Snapchat filters. Purikura filters included beautifying the image, cat whiskers, bunny ears, writing text, scribbling graffiti, selecting backdrops, borders, insertable decorations, icons, hair extensions, twinkling diamond tiaras, tenderized light effects, and predesigned decorative margins.

To capitalize on the Purikura phenomenon in Japan during the late 1990s, Japanese mobile phones began including a front-facing camera, starting with the Kyocera Visual Phone VP‑210 in 1999. The Sanyo SCP-5300 released in 2002 was the first camera phone with filter effects, such as illumination, white‑balance control, sepia, black and white, and negative colors. Purikura-like beauty filters later appeared in smartphone apps such as Instagram and Snapchat in the 2010s.

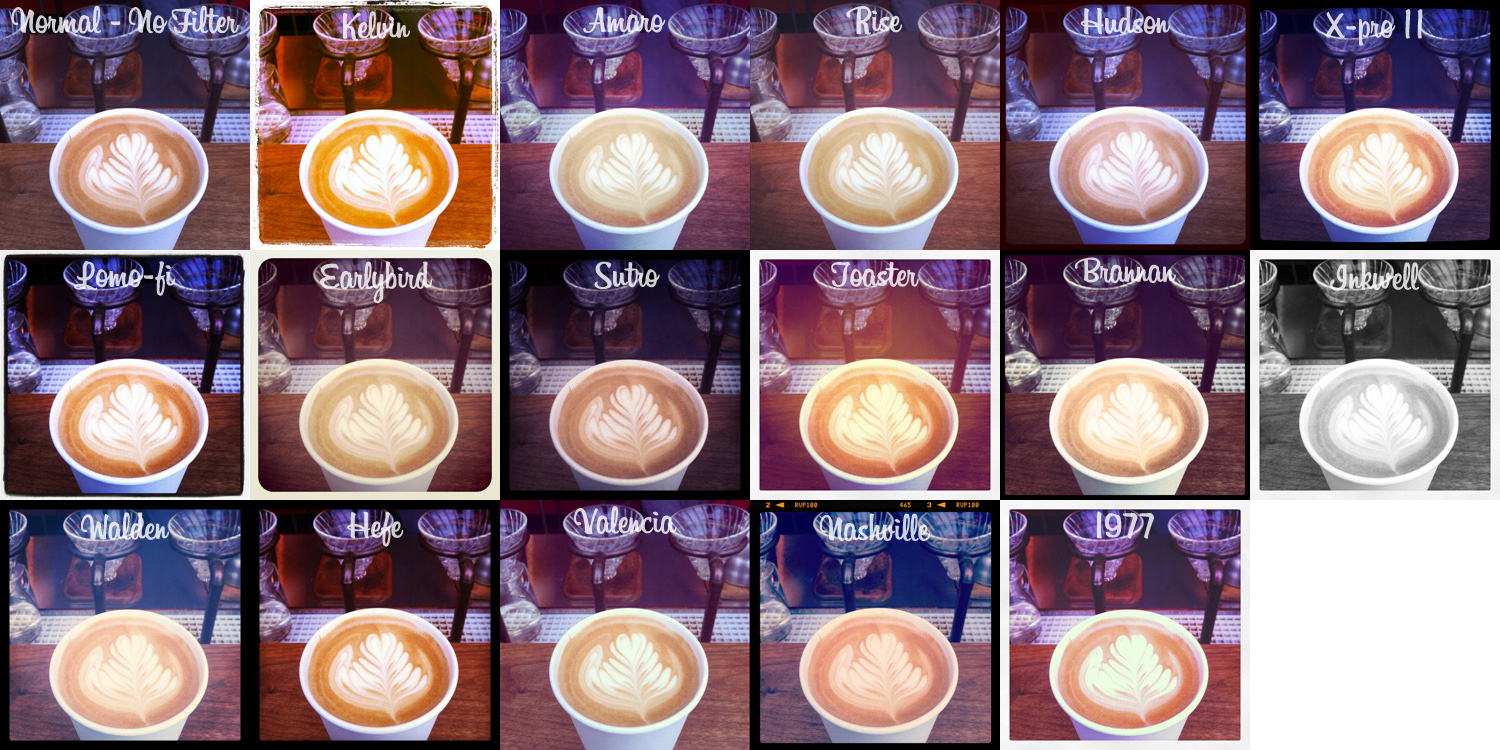
A photo collage of an original, unprocessed image (top left) modified with the 16 different filters available on Instagram in 2011

In 2010, Apple introduced the iPhone 4—the first iPhone model with a front-facing camera. It gave rise to a dramatic increase in selfies, which could be touched up with more flattering lighting effects with applications such as Instagram. The American photographer Cole Rise was involved in the creation of the original filters for Instagram around 2010, designing several of them himself, including Sierra, Mayfair, Sutro, Amaro, and Willow. However, the technology for virtual lens filters was invented and patented by Patrick Levy-Rosenthal in 2007. The patent received 100 citations, including Facebook, Nvidia, Microsoft, Samsung, and Snap. In September, 2011, the Instagram 2.0 update for the application introduced "live filters," which allowed the user to preview the effect of the filter while shooting with the application's camera. #NoFilter, a hashtag label to describe an image that had not been filtered, became popular around 2013.

An update in 2014 allowed users to adjust the intensity of the filters as well as fine-tune other aspects of the image, features that had been available for years on applications such as VSCO and Litely.

In 2014, Snapchat started releasing sponsored filters to monetize the participatory use of the application. In September 2015, Snapchat acquired Looksery and released a feature called "lenses," animated filters using facial recognition technology. Some of the early lenses available on Snapchat at the time were Heart Eyes, Terminator, Puke Rainbows, Old, Scary, Rage Face, Heart Avalanche. The Coachella filter released April 2016 was a popular early augmented reality filter.

In April 2017, Facebook released the Camera Effects Platform, which is the first augmented reality platform that allows developers to create their own filters and effects on Facebook's Camera. In December 2017, Snapchat also launched their Lens Studio augmented reality developer tool that allows users and advertisers to do the same on the Snapchat application. In April 2022,TikTok joined the two, and launched their own augmented reality developer platform called Effect house. In February 2023, Effect House gave opened up the access to generative AI tools that allowed creators to change facial features in real time. In November 2023, TikTok released a feature where users no longer needed Effect House to create their own filters, as they are now able to create their own effects on the TikTok application.

In August 2024, Meta announced that it would be removing third-party filter effects from its family of apps by January 14, 2025. The AR development software Meta Spark AR will also be retired at the same time; it was at one point the "world's largest mobile AR platform". Brand and creator effects represent the vast majority of filters available on Meta platforms, with over 2 million third-party filters available as of 2021.

== Beauty filter ==
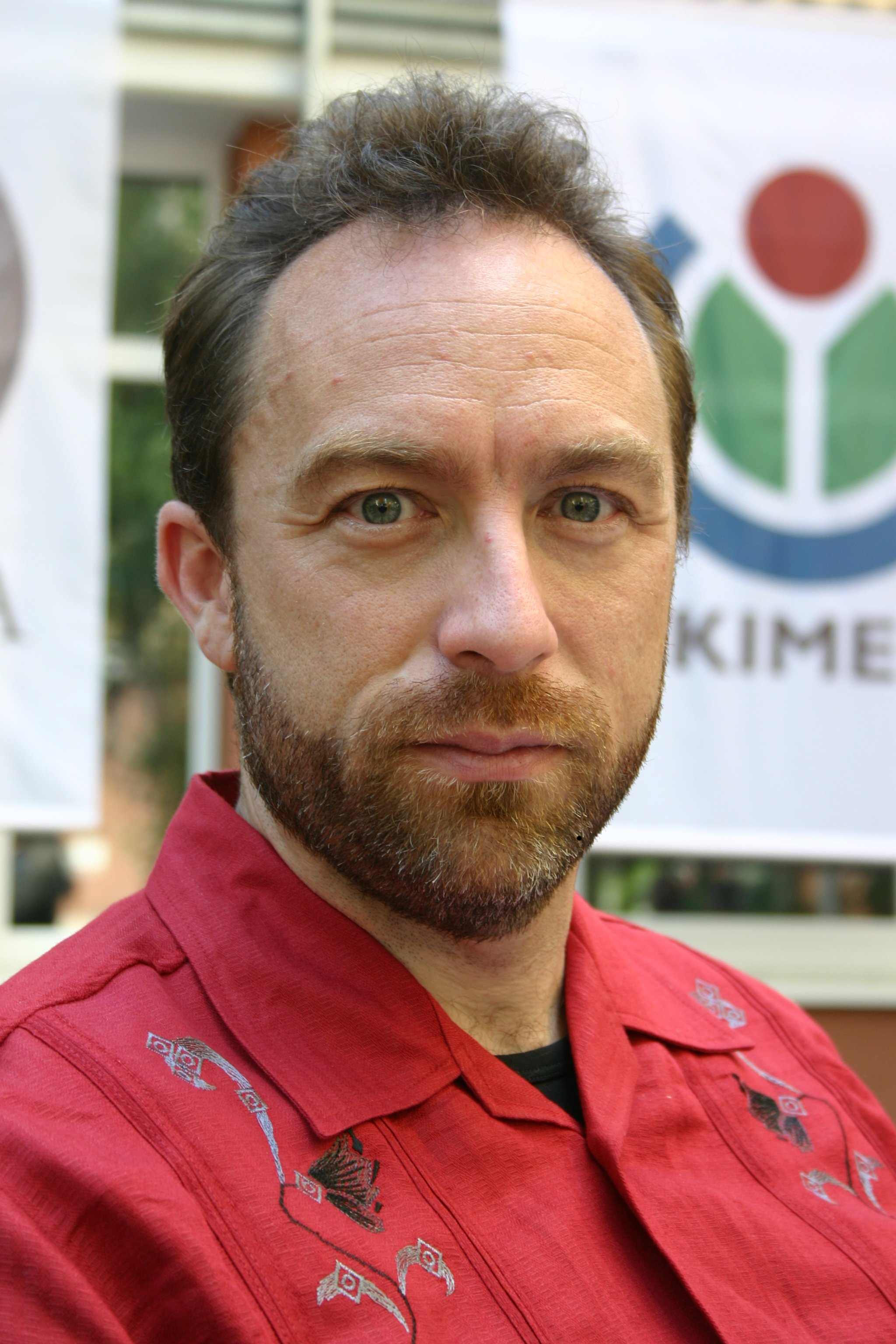
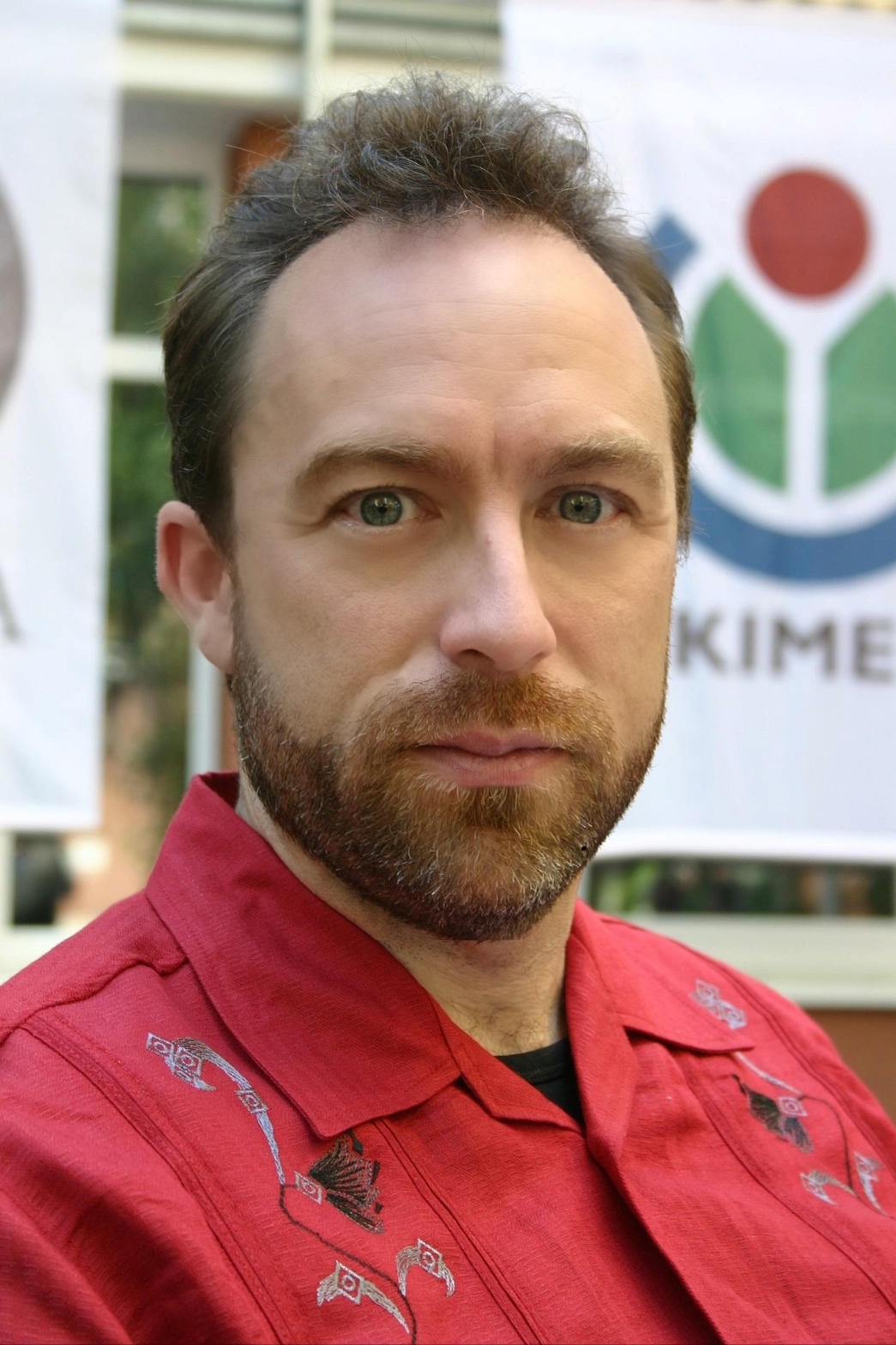
A photograph of Wikipedia co-founder Jimmy Wales before and after applying Facetune filters. The app has smoothed Wales's skin texture, and subtly altered the proportions of some of his facial features.

A beauty filter is a filter applied to still photographs, or to video in real time, to enhance the physical attractiveness of the subject. Typical effects of such filters include smoothing skin texture and modifying the proportions of facial features, for example enlarging the eyes or narrowing the nose.

Filters may be included as a built-in feature of social media apps such as Instagram or Snapchat, or implemented through standalone applications such as Facetune.

In 2020, the "Perfect Skin" filter for Snapchat and Instagram which was created by Brazilian augmented reality developer Brenno Faustino gained more than 36 million impressions in the first 24 hours of its release.

In 2021, TikTok users pointed out how the default front-facing camera on the platform automatically applied the retouch and other feature-altering filters. Users noted that these filters slimmed down faces, smoothed skin, whitened teeth, and altered facial features such as nose and eye size, without the option to disable this feature through settings.

In March 2023, the "Bold Glamour" filter was released on TikTok and instantly went viral with over 18 million videos created within its first week. This filter subtly enhances the user's facial features, giving the illusion of fuller eyebrows, taller cheekbones, enhanced eye makeup, a smaller nose, plumper lips, and clearer skin, giving off a natural yet distinct effect. As of May 2024, the filter has been used in over 220 million videos and has become a pivotal moment for beauty filters on digital platforms.

Critics have raised concerns that the widespread use of such filters on social media may lead to negative body image, particularly among girls. Though Meta's intention of removing third-party filters will likely see all beauty filters removed, academics feel that the damage of beautifying filters is already done.

=== Background ===
The manipulation of photos to enhance attractiveness has long been possible using software such as Adobe Photoshop and, before that, analogue techniques such as airbrushing. However, such tools required considerable technical and artistic skill, and so their use was mostly limited to professional contexts, such as magazines or advertisements.

By contrast, filters work in an automated fashion through the use of complex algorithms, requiring little or no input from the user. This ease of use, in combination with the increase in processing power of smartphones, and the rise of social media and selfie culture, have led to photographic manipulation occurring on a much wider scale than ever before.

One of the earliest examples of a content-aware digital photographic filter is red-eye reduction.

=== Effects ===
Typical changes applied by beauty filters include:

- Smoothing skin texture; minimizing fine lines and blemishes
- Erasing under-eye bags
- Erasing naso-labial lines ("laugh lines")
- Application of virtual makeup, such as lipstick or eyeshadow
- Slimming the face; erasing double chins
- Enlarging the eyes
- Whitening teeth
- Narrowing the nose
- Increasing fullness of the lips

Beauty filters most frequently target the face, though in some cases they may affect other body parts. For example, the app "Retouch Me" was reported to have a feature which allows users to superimpose visible abdominal muscles (a "six pack") onto photos featuring the subject's bare stomach.

=== Reception and psychological effects ===
Some commentators have expressed concern that beauty filters may create unrealistic beauty standards, particularly among girls, and contribute to rates of body dysmorphic disorder. A correlation has been established between negative body image and the use of beautifying filters, though the direction of causation is unknown.

The inability to discern whether a particular image has been filtered is thought to exacerbate their negative psychological effects. Policymakers have advocated for social networks to disclose the use of filters; TikTok, Instagram, and Snapchat all label filtered photos and videos with the name of the filter applied.

It has also been noted that beauty filters on social media tend to highlight Eurocentric features, like lighter eyes, a smaller nose, and flushed cheeks. These filters have been documented as contributing to social media users' feelings of body image insecurity, sometimes called "filter dysmorphia." This trend has led some to seek plastic surgery to make themselves look how they appear in social media filters.

=== Cosmetic procedures ===
Filters have been implicated in greater demand for cosmetic surgery and injections. The term "Snapchat dysmorphia" was coined by cosmetic doctor Tijion Esho to describe patients who presented to plastic surgeons seeking procedures to mimic the effects of filters, such as a narrowed nose, enlarged eyes, fuller lips, and smoothed skin.

Instagram previously hosted a number of third-party filters which explicitly simulated the effects of cosmetic procedures, as well as a filter, "FixMe", which allowed users to annotate their face with areas for surgical improvement, as a plastic surgeon might do with a marker. After public controversy around these filters, Facebook banned them in October 2019, along with all "distortion" filters, which altered the proportions of the face. In August 2020, Facebook re-allowed distortion filters, but continued to ban filters which "directly promote cosmetic surgery". Facial distortion filters are also unlisted in the app's "Effects Gallery", which shows the most popular filters at the time.

== Other filters ==
=== Animated filters ===
Animated filters gained popularity from 2015 to 2016, when Snapchat introduced animated lenses such as the dog filter, Coachella filter, Puke Rainbows, Scary, Heart Eyes.

=== Brand filters ===
Filters have also been used as a marketing tool by many brands with the help of augmented reality. Brands leverage the features on platforms such as Facebook, Instagram, TikTok, and Snapchat to provide an interactive experience for customers and increase brand awareness on the digital landscape. Some examples of these augmented reality filters include Fenty Beauty's shade match filter, NBA and Beats by Dre's basketball game filter, Google Pixel Watch's Try-Before-You-Buy Snapchat lens, and many more.

== Apps ==
Many applications allow users to enhance their photos with filters and adjust aspects such as exposure, white balance, contrast, and saturation of photos to their personal preferences. Applications such as VSCO, Snapseed, and Adobe Lightroom provide extensive editing tools and filters that allow users to experiment with different filters and create custom presets. Users are also able to explore and purchase filters or presets made by other creators.

Beauty filters are available as a built-in feature of many social media apps, most notably Instagram, Snapchat, and TikTok. In the case of Instagram and Snapchat, most filters are created by third-party developers rather than the app developers themselves. The video-conferencing app Zoom includes a "Touch-up My Appearance" filter which smooths blemishes and under-eye bags.

Beautifying effects may be bundled as part of other, more whimsical augmented reality filters, such as Instagram and Snapchat filters which give the user puppy ears or a flower crown.

Beauty filters may also be applied using standalone "beauty apps". One of the most popular such apps is Facetune. In 2017, Facetune was the most popular paid app on the Apple App Store. As of 2019, the paid app, and the free counterpart, Facetune2, had more than 55 million users between them. FaceApp is another image editing app which uses deep learning algorithms. Extreme use of the app's beauty filters was the subject of the "Yassification" Internet meme, in which photos are filtered to hyper-glamorour extremes to humorous effect.

Filters are most commonly applied to self-taken portraits ("selfies"). The close distance from which such photos are taken may create undesirable distortions, such as increasing the perceived size of the nose.

== Studies ==
A study from Yahoo! Labs (now Yahoo! Research) and the Georgia Institute of Technology found that filtered photos outperform unfiltered photos in terms of engagement on social media, with a 21% higher chance of being viewed and a 45% higher chance of generating a comment.

In 2019, a study found that the use of social media applications (YouTube, Tinder, Snapchat), along with Snapchat, Instagram, and VSCO filters were positively correlated with consideration and acceptance of cosmetic surgery. In contrast, the use of WhatsApp and Facebook was found to have lower acceptance of cosmetic surgery or no difference compared to nonusers, respectively. These results indicate that WhatsApp and Facebook are primarily used to connect with close friends and family, while applications such as YouTube, Tinder, and Snapchat are used on a larger social scope and are dependent on self-appearance.

In 2020, it was reported that 600 million people monthly were using augmented reality filters on Instagram or Facebook, while 76% of Snapchat users were using them daily.

== See also ==
- Instagram face
- Body dysmorphic disorder
