= Nightly Pop =

American late night talk show

- Directed by: Fred Mendes
- Starring: Morgan Stewart; Hunter March; Nina Parker
- Country of origin: United States
- No. of seasons: 4
- No. of episodes: 501

Production
- Executive producer: Jennifer Lavin
- Producer: Amy Rhodin
- Production location: NBCUniversal/Comcast
- Camera setup: Multi-camera
- Running time: 30 minutes

Original release
- Network: E!
- Release: October 29, 2018 – September 22, 2022

Related
- Daily Pop

Nightly Pop is an American late night talk show that airs on E!. It premiered on October 29, 2018.

== Premise ==
This fresh and edgy late-night talk show, hosted by Morgan Stewart, Nina Parker and Hunter March, delves into the latest celebrity and pop culture news.

== Cast ==
The show currently stars Morgan Stewart, Hunter March and Nina Parker.

== Production ==
The show was announced by E! in October 2018.

The series premiered on October 29, 2018.

In August 2019, it was announced by E! that the show would be airing four nights a week starting in November 2019. E! also revealed many changes for the network in the upcoming year.

On November 8, 2019, E! Revealed that Nightly Pop will start airing four nights a week starting on November 17.

On March 13, 2020, it was announced that the show would be on hiatus until further notice alongside E! Daily Pop. They later returned in April 2020.

On August 26, 2022, It was announced that the show is cancelled and will end production in early October. It will replace with a new nightly show that will launch in late October.

The show wraps on September 22, 2022.
