= Coachella filter =

Social media filter

The Coachella filter was an augmented reality social media camera filter released April 2016 that superimposed a flower crown on the user's head and brightened the complexion of the user's skin. The filter appeared on the Snapchat photo messaging application on the occasion of the Coachella music festival in 2016, using the festival's recognizable "boho-chic aesthetic." The Coachella filter became popular worldwide.

The filter was criticized for whitewashing users' skin complexion and contributing to unrealistic beauty standards and dysmorphia.

The filter is no longer available.
