= Nina Parker =

American journalist and fashion designer

- Born: Sacramento, California, U.S.
- Education: San Francisco State University (BA)
- Occupations: Journalist, fashion designer
- Years active: 2007―present
- Known for: Nightly Pop

Nina Parker is an American television journalist, television presenter and fashion designer. Parker co-hosted Nightly Pop on E! (2018–2022). She partnered with Macy's to release a self-titled clothing line in 2021.

== Life and career ==
Parker was raised in Sacramento, California. She received her bachelor's degree in broadcast and electronic communication arts from San Francisco State University. While at San Francisco State University, she became a member of Delta Sigma Theta sorority.

She began her entertainment career at TMZ in 2007. In 2011, she went on to work as an entertainment correspondent for The Insider. In 2015, she became the host for the Love & Hip Hop reunion shows, and hosted for four years until 2020. She was hired as an inaugural co-host on E!'s Nightly Pop in 2018 and stayed in that role until the show ended in 2022. Parker has appeared as a panelist on Dating #NoFilter.

On May 14, 2021, she released a self-titled clothing line for Macy's, the first plus-size brand by a Black designer released exclusively by the retailer. She was inspired to develop a line in 2019 due to her own frustration with the lack of fashionable options for plus-size women. Parker previously designed her own gowns for Live from the Red Carpet event pre-shows such as the 2020 Academy Awards. In collaboration with Reunited Clothing, Parker designed every item in the Nina Parker Collection. New items debuted monthly in 2021 after the initial release. Parker's line headlined Harlem Fashion Week in 2025.

In July 2026, Parker was announced as a co-host of the Crooked Media pop culture podcast Keep It! opposite television writer Louis Virtel. Parker frequently appeared as a guest host on Keep It! during an interim period in which the show sought a replacement for Ira Madison III, who had served as a co-host since 2018.
