= Hear Me Good =

1957 film by Don McGuire

- Theatrical release poster
- Directed by: Don McGuire
- Screenplay by: Don McGuire
- Produced by: Don McGuire
- Starring: Hal March; Joe E. Ross; Merry Anders; Jean Willes; Milton Frome; Joey Faye
- Cinematography: Haskell B. Boggs
- Edited by: George Tomasini
- Music by: Jack Hayes; Leo Shuken
- Production company: Paramount Pictures
- Distributed by: Paramount Pictures
- Release date: October 1957
- Running time: 80 minutes
- Country: United States
- Language: English

Hear Me Good is a 1957 American comedy film written and directed by Don McGuire. The film stars Hal March, Joe E. Ross, Merry Anders, Jean Willes, Milton Frome and Joey Faye. The film was released in October 1957, by Paramount Pictures.

== Cast ==
- Hal March as Marty Holland
- Joe E. Ross as Max Crane
- Merry Anders as Ruth Collins
- Jean Willes as Rita Hall
- Milton Frome as Mr. Ross
- Joey Faye as Charlie Cooper
- Richard Bakalyan as Hermie
- Tom Duggan as TV Director
