= Dating NoFilter =

American television series

Dating #NoFilter
- Genre: Reality television

Production
- Executive producers: Kate Little; Claire Poyser; Tim Pastore; Shauna Thomas; Ben Crompton; Sarah Tyekiff
- Producers: Lime Pictures, All3Media America

Original release
- Release: January 21, 2019

Dating #NoFilter is an American dating reality television series that premiered on E! on January 21, 2019.

== Background ==
The show was produced by Lime Pictures and All3Media America. The series features a panel of comedians watching and making humorous commentary on footage of blind first dates set up by the producers.

The show was renewed for a second season on May 3, 2019. The second season premiered on August 6, 2019. A UK version of the series was ordered by Sky in December 2020. It premiered on February 25, 2021.

== Format ==
For every episode, singles are paired up and sent on blind first dates. A panel of seven comedians split into three pairs watches footage of the first dates and makes commentary while sitting on a couch and enjoying refreshments. Past panelists have included Nina Parker, Cara Connors, and Kelsey Darragh.

== Reviews ==
The Daily Telegraph rated it a 2 Star out of 5. It stated: "...the concept: those on the dates are there to be laughed at, by the comedians, by us, therefore they have to be risible – buffoons, braggarts and Barbie dolls. We cannot root for the singletons, as we do so often on First Dates, which robs the show of heart and purpose."

The Chortle rated it a 3 Star out of 5.

Sportsology called it "Dating on Steroids" and also "The hosts are funny, and the daters have no boundaries."

== Cast ==
=== Main ===
- Nina Parker as herself (host)
- Daisy May Cooper as herself (host for the British Version of Dating #NoFilter)
- Zach Noe Towers as himself (host)
- Biniam Bizuneh as himself (host)
- Ben Evans as himself (host)
- Cara Connors as herself (host)
- Kelsey Darragh as herself (host)
- Monroe Martin as himself (host)
- Shapel Lacey as himself (host)
- Steve Furey as himself (host)
- Rocky Dale Davis as himself (host)

=== Guest stars ===
- Dan Babic as himself
- Marco DelVecchio as himself
- William Forrest Burke as himself
- Lexi Noel as herself
- Tyrone Evans Clark as himself
- Brian Mychal Fleming as himself / Breyoncé
- Reante Brown as himself

== See also ==
- NoFilter
