= Corky Hale =

American musician (born 1936)

- Born: July 3, 1936 (age 89)
- Origin: United States
- Occupations: Jazz harpist, Pianist, Flutist, and Vocalist

Corky Hale (born July 3, 1936) is an American jazz harpist, pianist, flutist, and vocalist. She has been a theater producer, political activist, restaurateur, and the owner of the Corky Hale women's clothing store in Los Angeles, California.

== Early life and education ==
On July 3, 1936, Hale was born Merrilyn Hecht in Freeport, Illinois. She had learned piano, harp, flute, and cello by the time she was in her teens. She studied at the Chicago Music Conservatory and at Interlochen Center for the Arts in Michigan.

At age 16, she enrolled in Stephens College, a school for young ladies, for her last year of high school. After graduation, she announced to her parents that she was moving to Hollywood to be a musician; her father sent her to nearby University of Wisconsin–Madison. After a year of college, she dropped out, again intending to move to Hollywood. A compromise with her parents led to becoming at student at UCLA.

She is Jewish. In a 1997 interview with SFGATE, she describes herself as a "Jewish princess who had a wonderful childhood".

== Personal life ==
Corky Hall is married to Mike Stoller of the Leiber-Stoller songwriting team.

== Career ==
During the 1950s, she was a studio musician in Hollywood, playing harp on albums by Chet Baker, June Christy, Ella Fitzgerald Anita O'Day, and Frank Sinatra. She worked as a vocalist with Freddy Martin at the Coconut Grove in Los Angeles. Jerry Gray invited her to perform with his band at Las Vegas, where she played piano for Billie Holiday and accompanied her on tour. As a solo act, she recorded the album Corky Hale Plays George Gershwin and Vernon Duke with Buddy Collette, Howard Roberts, and Chico Hamilton. On October 12, 1968, she accompanied Tony Bennett on The Tonight Show Starring Johnny Carson and sang a song by herself.

She has worked with Liberace, Frank Sinatra, Barbra Streisand, Elkie Brooks, Tony Bennett, Billie Holiday, Harry James, Peggy Lee, James Brown, Spike Jones, George Michael and Björk. Hale has also produced plays, including Give 'Em Hell, Harry, starring Jason Alexander and Lullaby of Broadway, a profile of the lyricist Al Dubin. She has appeared at Vibrato, Catalina Bar & Grill, Knickerbocker Saloon, The White House, and the Kennedy Center.

At the University of Wisconsin, Hale was one of the few white students to join the NAACP. She was a birth control teacher at Planned Parenthood in New York and is on the National Advisory Board of NARAL and on the board of WRRAP. She is an American Film Institute associate and is the founder of Angel Harvest, an organization which redistributes unused food from restaurants, hotels, and events to hungry and needy people in Los Angeles.

== Discography ==
=== As leader ===
- Modern Harp Vol. 17 (GNP, 1956)
- Harp Beat (Stash, 1985)
- Harp! the Herald Angels Swing (LaserLight, 1995)
- Have Yourself a Jazzy Little Christmas (LML Music, 1999)

=== As guest ===
- Chet Baker, Sings and Plays with Bud Shank, Russ Freeman and Strings (Pacific Jazz, 1955)
- Tony Bennett, Tony Makes It Happen! (Columbia, 1967)
- Bjork, Debut (One Little Indian, 1993)
- Bjork, Surrounded (One Little Indian, 2006)
- Elkie Brooks, Live and Learn (A&M, 1979)
- Elkie Brooks, Two Days Away (A&M, 1977)
- Artie Butler, Have You Met Miss Jones? (A&M/CTI, 1968)
- Judy Collins, Judith (Elektra, 1975)
- Dino & Sembello, Dino & Sembello (A&M, 1974)
- Ella Fitzgerald, Sings the Cole Porter Song Book (Verve, 1956)
- Ella Fitzgerald, Ella Fitzgerald Sings the Rodgers and Hart Song Book (Verve, 1956)
- Roberta Flack, Chapter Two (Atlantic, 1970)
- Roberta Flack, Quiet Fire (Atlantic, 1971)
- Dean Friedman, Dean Friedman (Lifesong, 1977)
- Herbie Harper, Herbie Harper (Bethlehem, 1955)
- Harry James, The Bands of Renown (Renown, 1993)
- Steve Kuhn, Gary McFarland, The October Suite (Impulse!, 1967)
- Ronny Lang/Ray Sims/Dave Pell/Don Fagerquist, The Les Brown All Stars (Capitol, 1955)
- Peggy Lee, Mirrors (A&M, 1975)
- Jon Lucien, Rashida (RCA, 1995)
- Melissa Manchester, Home to Myself (Bell, 1973)
- Herbie Mann, Turtle Bay (Atlantic, 1973)
- Wade Marcus, A New Era (Cotillion, 1971)
- Les McCann, Invitation to Openness (Atlantic, 1972)
- Murray McEachern, Music for Sleepwalkers Only (Key, 1956)
- Anita O'Day, Anita (Verve, 1956)
- Anita O'Day, In a Mellow Tone (DRG, 1989)
- Nina Simone, Here Comes the Sun (RCA Victor, 1971)
- Lyn Stanley, The Moonlight Sessions (A.T. Music, 2017)
- Stealers Wheel, Ferguslie Park (A&M, 1973)
- Kitty White, A Moment of Love (Pacific Jazz, 1956)
