= Emogenius =

American game show (2017–2018)

- Genre: Game show
- Written by: Shawn Kennedy
- Directed by: Rob George
- Presented by: Hunter March
- Country of origin: United States
- Original language: English
- No. of seasons: 1
- No. of episodes: 40

Production
- Executive producers: Craig Brooks; Larry Barron
- Running time: 20−22 minutes
- Production companies: Game Show Enterprises; Craig Brooks Productions; Larry Barron Entertainment

Original release
- Network: Game Show Network
- Release: June 14, 2017 – November 18, 2018

Emogenius is an American game show that is broadcast by Game Show Network. The series features two teams of contestants who compete as teams against each other by decoding emoji-themed messages. The main game consists of three rounds of various themes. The team that accumulates the most money in the main game wins the game, keeps their bank, and advances to a bonus round, where their winnings can be increased to up to $10,000 if they can solve five messages within the time limit (60 seconds). The series was first announced March 17, 2017, it premiered nearly three months later on June 14, 2017. It is hosted by Hunter March, grandson of The $64,000 Question host Hal March.

== Gameplay ==
Two teams of two contestants compete in the main game, which consists of three rounds. In the opening round, called “Get the Message (or Texting with the Stars on some episodes),” each team is given two questions based on fictional text message conversations, each consisting of a question being asked and a reply being a series of emojis. The team has 15 seconds to decipher what the reply means. Each team's first question is worth $100, while the second question is worth $200. If the team fails to decipher the reply, their opponents have five seconds to decipher the same message for half of the question's original value.

In the second round, called “In-App Purchase” each team is shown a category and an emoji-based clue. The opening value of the question is $300. The team may swipe upwards on their touchscreen up to two times to receive clues in assistance in solving the puzzle; however, each additional clue reduces the value by $100 (the so-called “in-app purchase” which gives the round its name). The team must solve the clues within 20 seconds to earn the remaining money. If they fail to do so, the other team has five seconds to solve for the remaining money. Each team is given two questions in this round.

The leading team goes first in the third round, called “Hit Send.” One member of each team is designated the sender, while the other is the receiver. The sender is shown a message to send, as the host announces the category, and uses the emoji on their touchscreen to communicate the message to their partner, who must decode the message. Either member of the team may pass at any time. Each message successfully communicated is worth $400. Each team has 45 seconds to communicate as many messages as possible. Whoever has more money at the end of the round is the champion, keeps their money, and plays the final round for $10,000. If the team that was originally trailing overtakes their opponents, they are allowed to finish out their round in an effort to win additional money. In the event of a tie at the end of this round, both teams are shown a sudden-death emoji message. Whoever buzzes in by touching their screen is given the opportunity to answer, if they are correct, they are the champions, otherwise, their opponents could guess it and if they're right, they are the champions.

=== Final round: Masters of Text ===
The Masters of Text round is played in a similar manner to the Hit Send round, one member of the team begins as the sender of emoji messages, the other as the receiver. As in the final round of the main game, the team may pass as often as needed. The team must alternate roles when the receiver successfully solves the message. Each message solved is worth $200, if the team successfully solves five messages within a minute, their winnings are increased to $10,000.

Additionally, certain episodes may be designated as "Double Text" games. In Double Text games, all normal dollar values are doubled, and the "Masters of Text" round is played for $20,000.

== Production ==
Game Show Network (GSN) first announced Emogenius at their 2017 upfront presentation in New York on March 17, 2017. The series premiered on June 14, 2017 with 20 of 40 taped episodes airing during its first run. The series is hosted by Internet and YouTube personality Hunter March, who is the grandson of the former host of The $64,000 Question, Hal March. GSN also produced an online version of the game, which can be played on the network's website. Game Show Enterprises, LLC serves as the series' production company, while executive producers include Craig Brooks and Larry Barron, both of whom serve in the same role on GSN's Idiotest.

Due to copyright logistics, GSN was forced to develop their own emoji designs for the series' usage. GSN Publicist Melissa Carr noted, "On the show, we have to develop our own set of emojis — the others are copyrighted. So they not only have to come up with our own emojis, they have to figure out a puzzle that gets you to Jim Carrey." The show was not greenlit for a second season.

== Reception ==
Writing for The Boston Globe, Michael Andor Brodeur argued that while the show may feel like an advertisement for emoji, "the most satisfying part is watching self-proclaimed enthusiasts of the form stumble through their symbols once the difficulty is ever-so-slightly notched up....watching so much get lost in translation feels like a win." In terms of ratings, the series' first two episodes debuted to 336,000 and 322,000 respective viewers, with a 0.10 and 0.09 18–49 rating respectively.
