= NoFilter =

Social media hashtag

#NoFilter is a hashtag used by users on social media platforms to indicate that no social media filter has been used on the shared images; it is mostly commonly used on Instagram. By using this hashtag, users can make a point that they are sharing real images and not deceiving others. In today's world, there is a lot of pressure on people to look perfect, especially women, so they are very likely to edit their images using different kinds of filters available on social media to look better. Not only common people but also celebrities are impacted by this pressure. However, there are people who use filter but still use this hashtag. According to research by Spredfast in 2018, 11% of Instagram posts with #NoFilter did use a filter. This hashtag is often misused, so it has lost its value in recent years.

== History ==
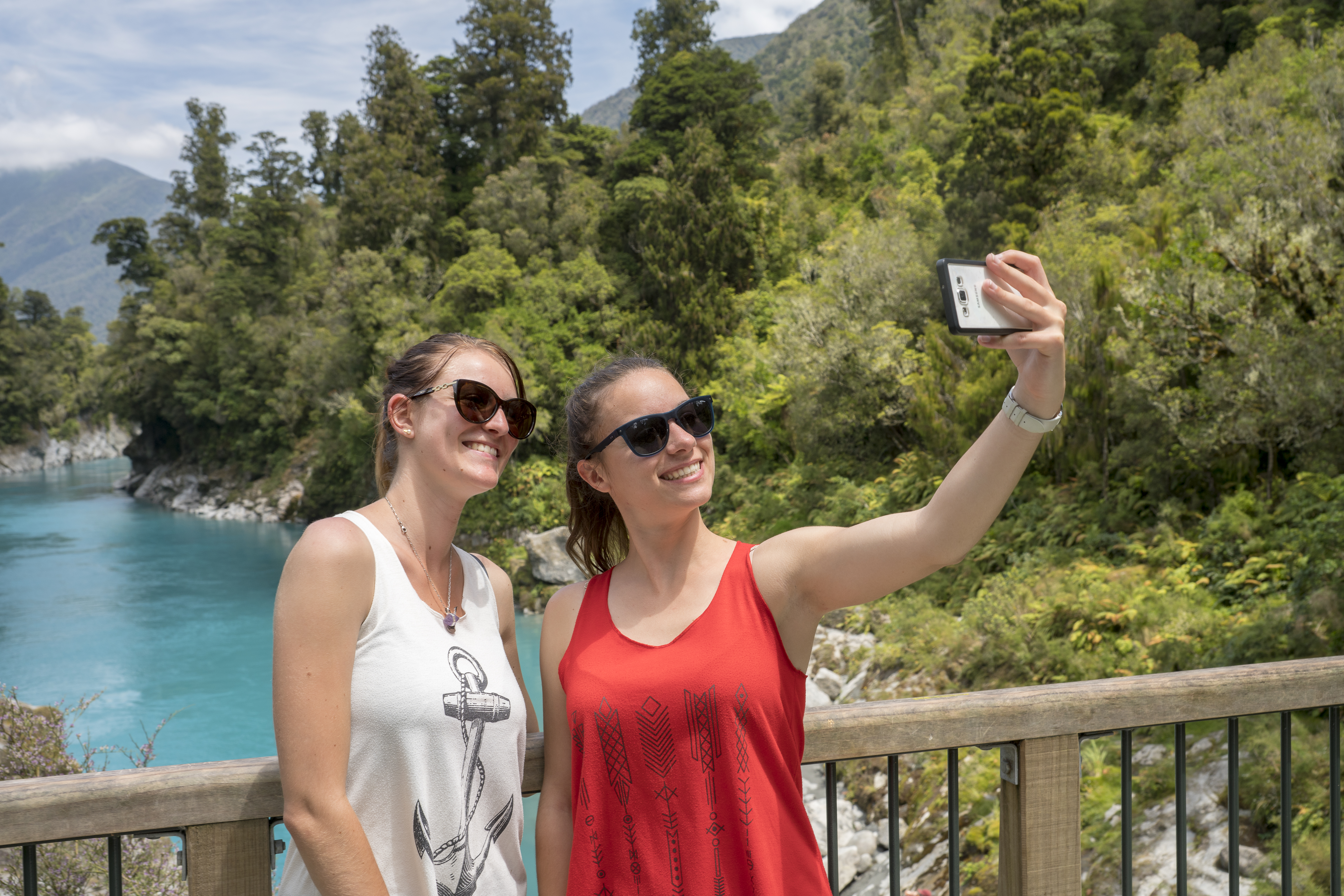
Two women taking a selfie

When Instagram was launched in 2010, the app offered limited filters that users could use to tweak their images before sharing, and over time, the number of filters increased and so did the use of filters; it became an issue because people started lying about if they had used filters. Filters allowed people to hide their insecurities and appear flawless; in most cases, it is easy to determine if someone has used a filter, but sometimes, it takes a lot of analysis, depending on the level of editing done. For example, celebrities may hire professional editors to tweak their images before posting. Using filters quickly became a popular thing among Gen Z users, especially women; a study found that 62 percent of American Gen Z users used filters on their images, mostly selfies, and 23 percent of them were trying to change how they looked. This shows how women are made to feel that they need to change how they look. Soon, everyone was using filters, and this gave rise to some issues. Many users felt that they were being forced to use filters, while others tried to call out influencers who were deceiving their followers by using filters.

== Controversy ==
#NoFilter started as a positive thing, inspiring people to be who they are. It aimed to motivate people to show their real selves and not be ashamed of themselves. However, people started misusing the hashtag. They still used the hashtag on images that were tweaked and deceive others. Many celebrities and influencers were called out for misusing the hashtag. American reality TV star and businesswoman, Kylie Jenner was heavily criticized for using filters on her images while promoting her cosmetic brand; she was selling cosmetics but using filters on her images, which others found hypocritical.

== Impact ==
Initially, #NoFilter was seen as a tool of empowerment; users, especially young women who no longer want to use filters to look better, use it to fight the pressure of always look perfect for others. However, now it is used as a trick. Many people do not believe the posts that use this hashtag; research shows that this hashtag is nothing but a lie because of being heavily misused.

== See also ==
- Dating NoFilter
