= Milton Frome =

American actor (1909–1989)

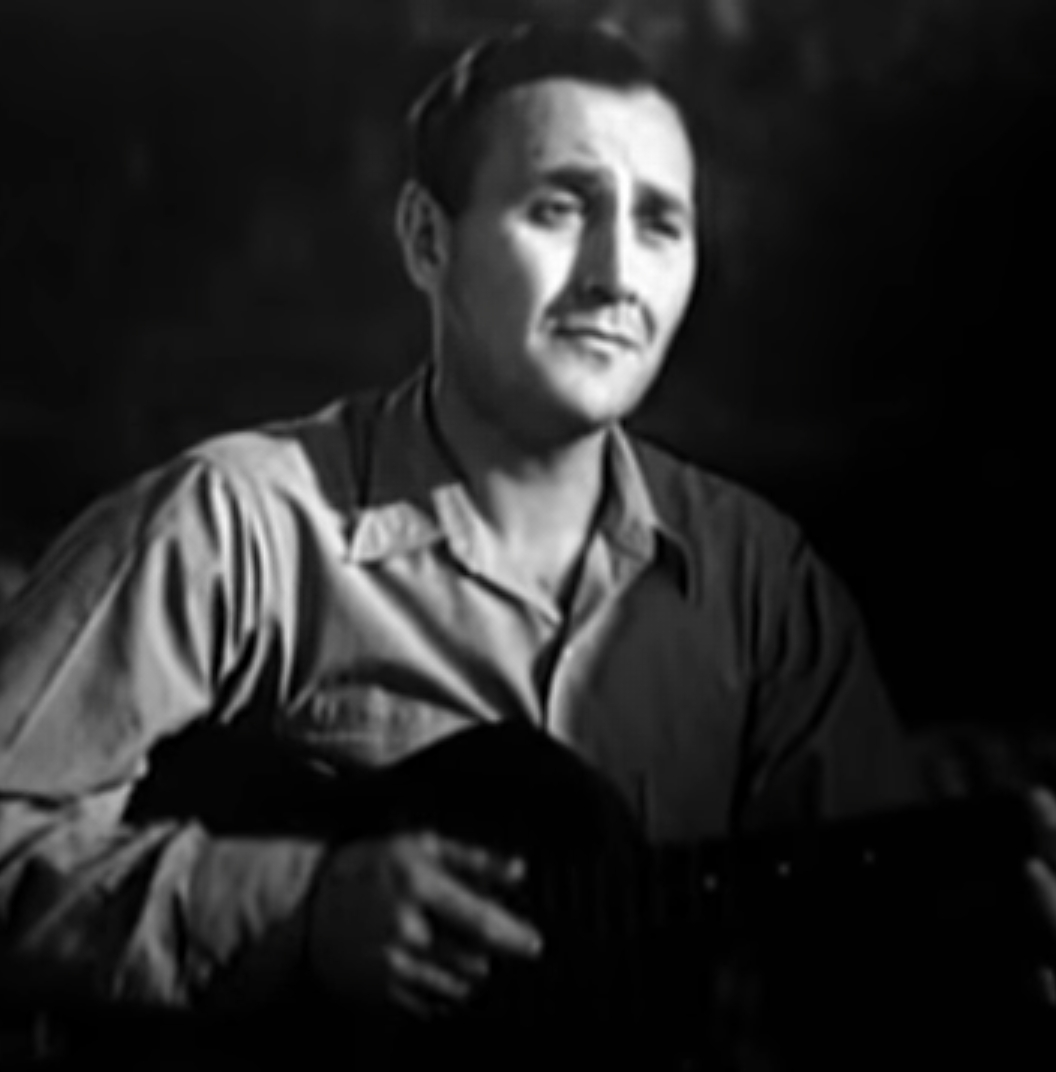
- Frome in Ride em Cowgirl (1939)
- Born: February 24, 1909; Philadelphia, Pennsylvania, U.S.
- Died: March 21, 1989 (aged 80); Los Angeles, California, U.S.
- Resting place: Forest Lawn – Hollywood Hills Cemetery
- Occupation: Actor
- Years active: 1934–1977
- Spouse: Marjorie Frome
- Children: 1

Milton Frome (February 24, 1909 – March 21, 1989) was an American character actor.

== Career ==
Born in Philadelphia, Pennsylvania, Frome landed his first acting job in the short subject Daredevil O'Dare in 1934. He did not act again until 1939 when he joined the cast of Ride 'Em Cowgirl as Oliver Sheahe.

His acting career stalled until 1950, when he began to find steady work appearing on television shows like I Love Lucy, Adventures of Superman and Lassie. He also worked with The Three Stooges during their final years in the Columbia Pictures short subject department, appearing in the films Pies and Guys and Quiz Whizz.

Frome was very busy in the 1960s, concentrating mainly on character acting roles for television. He also appeared as a comic foil in many Jerry Lewis films. He covered all types, ranging from hapless souls and college professors to heavies, salesmen, and policemen. Frome could be seen on such shows as Hennesey, The Lawless Years, 77 Sunset Strip, The Dick Van Dyke Show, Bat Masterson, The Twilight Zone,The New Phil Silvers Show, The Addams Family, Batman, Adam-12, Bewitched, Adventures of Superman (TV series), The Beverly Hillbillies, The Monkees, and A Touch of Grace.

== Death ==
Frome continued acting until 1977, his last role being in the made-for-television remake of the film Captains Courageous. He died of congestive heart failure on March 21, 1989, aged 80, and was buried in Forest Lawn – Hollywood Hills Cemetery.

== Filmography ==
- Ride 'em, Cowgirl (1939) – Oliver Shea
- Dick Tracy's G-Men (1939) – Officer (uncredited)
- Calling All Marines (1939) – Hospital Corpsman (uncredited)
- The Seven Little Foys (1955) – Driscoll (uncredited)
- You're Never Too Young (1955) – Lieutenant O'Malley
- The Birds and the Bees (1956) – Assistant Butler
- The Man Who Knew Too Much (1956) – Guard (uncredited)
- Pardners (1956) – Hawkins, the Butler
- The Girl Can't Help It (1956) – Nick (uncredited)
- Public Pigeon No. 1 (1957) – Avery
- The Wayward Bus (1957) – Stanton (uncredited)
- The Delicate Delinquent (1957) – Mr. Herman
- The Lonely Man (1957) – Bixby (uncredited)
- The Fuzzy Pink Nightgown (1957) – Police Lieutenant Dempsey
- Short Cut to Hell (1957) – LAPD Captain (uncredited)
- Hear Me Good (1957) – Mr. Ross
- Sing, Boy, Sing (1958) – Man at Recording Studio (uncredited)
- The Young Lions (1958) – Draft Board Physician (uncredited)
- Go, Johnny, Go! (1959) – Mr. Martin
- Visit to a Small Planet (1960) – Police Commissioner
- Please Don't Eat the Daisies (1960) – Gus (uncredited)
- Cinderfella (1960) – Butler (uncredited)
- The Police Dog Story (1961) – Todd Wellman
- All Hands on Deck (1961) – Officer with Damaged Car (uncredited)
- The Errand Boy (1961) – Mr. Greenback
- It's Only Money (1962) – Cop at Pier
- Bye Bye Birdie (1963) – Mr. Maude
- The Nutty Professor (1963) – Dr. M. Sheppard Leevee
- A Ticklish Affair (1963) – Fireman
- Who's Minding the Store? (1963) – Francois, the Driver
- The Beverly Hillbillies (1964-1967) - Lawrence Chapman
- What a Way to Go! (1964) – Lawyer (uncredited)
- I'd Rather Be Rich (1964) – Max
- The Disorderly Orderly (1964) – Board Member
- John Goldfarb, Please Come Home! (1965) – Air Force General
- Girl Happy (1965) – Police Captain (uncredited)
- Fluffy (1965) – Tweedy Physicist
- The Family Jewels (1965) – Pilot
- Dr. Goldfoot and the Bikini Machine (1965) – Motorcycle Cop
- The Dick Van Dyke Show (1965) – Mr. Evans
- Batman (1966) – Vice Admiral Fangschliester
- Way... Way Out (1966) – American Delegate
- The Swinger (1966) – Mr. Olsson
- Enter Laughing (1967) – Policeman
- The St. Valentine's Day Massacre (1967) – Adam Heyer
- The Monkees (1967) – Manny in S1:E28, "Monkees on the Line"
- The Monkees (1968) – Latham in S2:E25, "Monkees Blow Their Minds"
- Chubasco (1968) – Police Sergeant
- With Six You Get Eggroll (1968) – Bud Young
- Which Way to the Front? (1970) – Mr. Fennick – Executive (uncredited)
- Adam 12 (1972) - Milton Sawyer
- Emergency! (1974) - Zoo keeper
- The Strongest Man in the World (1975) – Mr. Lufkin
- Next Stop, Greenwich Village (1976) – Drugstore Customer (uncredited)
- Gus (1976) – Lukom
- The Shaggy D.A. (1976) – Auctioneer
- Beyond Reason (1977) – Cyril (final film role)
