= 2020 Academy Awards =

2020 Academy Awards may refer to:

- 92nd Academy Awards, the Academy Awards ceremony that took place in 2020, honoring the best in film for 2019
- 93rd Academy Awards, the Academy Awards ceremony that took place in 2021, honoring the best in film for January 2020 through February 2021
