= Shea Arender =

American singer-songwriter

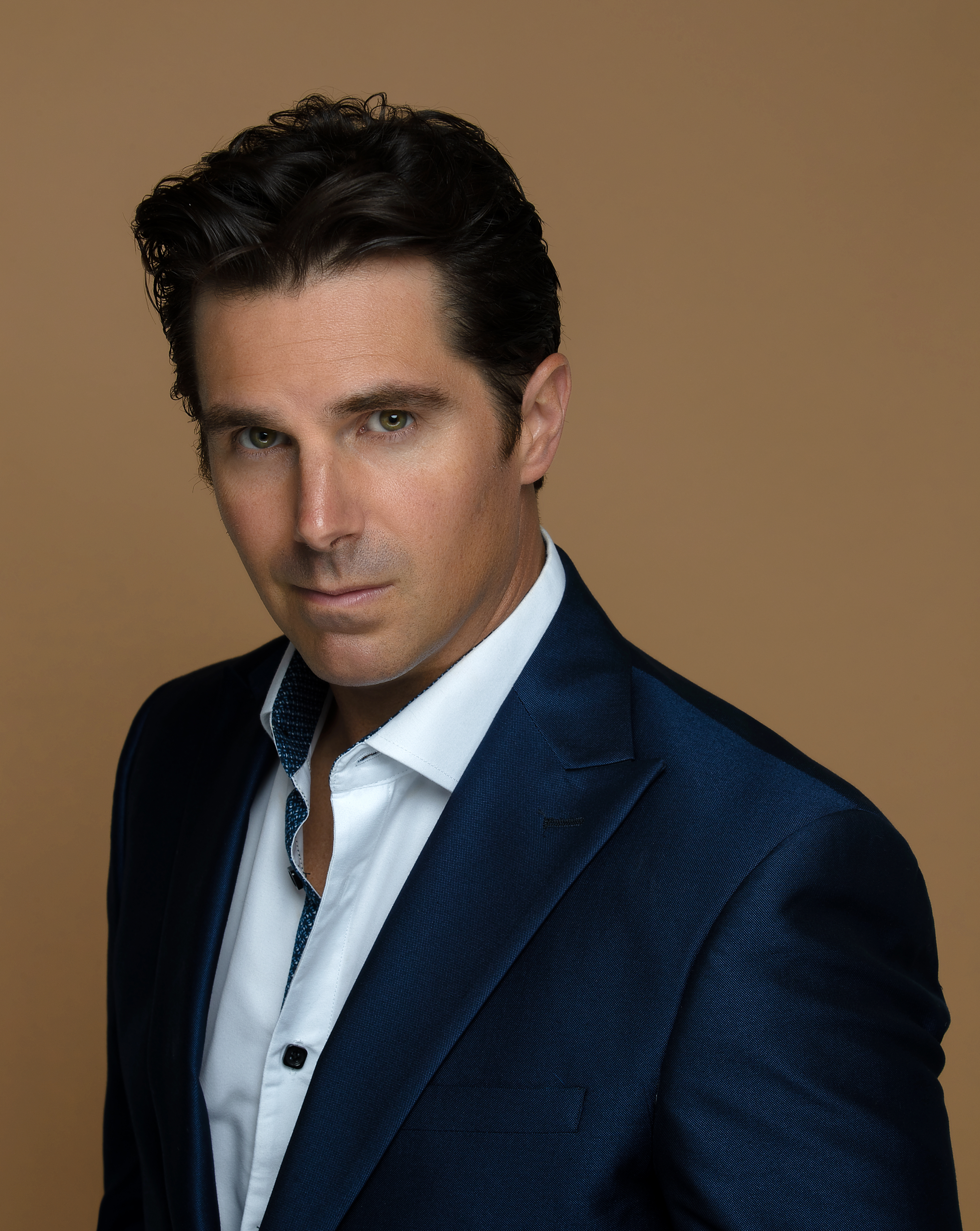
- Arender in 2021

Background information
- Birth name: Shea Bradley Arender
- Born: November 7, 1980 (age 44) Tallulah, Louisiana USA
- Genres: Symphony Pops, Rockabilly, Country, Adult Contemporary
- Occupations: Symphony Producer; Singer; Entrepreneur; Author
- Instruments: Vocals, Guitar
- Years active: 2001–present
- Website: www.sheaarender.com

Shea Bradley Arender (born 7 November 1980) is an American symphony producer, entrepreneur, Broadway producer, and the CEO/owner of the Las Vegas Symphony Orchestra. Though not primarily, he is also a vocalist, music arranger, songwriter and poet. Since July 2013, he has been executive producing Harold Arlen's Broadway Estate musical "The Wonderful Wizard of Song" around the world and throughout the U.S., and has been executive producing and starring in his own off-Broadway musical "Shea: Prince of Christmas".

== Early life and education ==
Arender was born in Louisiana and spent his young adult life in Houston, Texas. His mother, LaShara, was an independent clothing designer who also worked in the skin care industry; his father, Billy Arender, worked in agriculture. Arender is of Irish, French, and Austrian ancestry.

He credits his varied musical influences as gospel, pop-rock, soul and Dixieland Jazz. At age 12, Arender won an on-ship talent contest on a family cruise aboard the Commodore Cruise Line. Two days later, he was chosen to play Elvis Presley to entertain passengers when the original Elvis tribute performer fell ill. This kicked off an early career during which Arender performed tributes to Elvis at various venues in New Orleans, across the south, and in Las Vegas. He also had many of his poems published as a member of the Georgia Poetry Society.

Arender was educated at Georgia State University in Atlanta, and attended American Inter-Continental University at both the Atlanta and Miami campuses, at which he studied international business. He graduated there in 2004, with a BS in International Business. In 2005, he was featured as one of the top new poets by the Poem Hunter Publication, honoring new poets on the rise. Throughout college, he performed musically on various local stages.

== Career ==
In 2000, at age 20, Arender briefly performed at the Imperial Palace in Biloxi, Mississippi, for the popular "Legends in Concert". Soon after, he toured with his Elvis tribute show across the south, in Brazil and in Italy. While in Grado, Italy, at age 22, he studied Opera and Italian Music studies at Scuola Insieme. The next year, he signed with the Tropicana Entertainment in Laughlin, Nevada, and performed for six months at many of their U.S. entertainment properties. For the remainder of his 20s, he continued to perform in various venues throughout the US.

In 2007, Arender released a solo tribute album titled "American Trilogy", that was only made available at his live shows. In 2010, Arender co-wrote with Steve Blaze, from the hard rock group Lillian Axe, an original Christmas song entitled "The Christmas I Met You", released on New Orleans–based Mandeville Records. "The Christmas I Met You" rose to 1 on the Cash Box Easy Listening Charts. The Merry Christmas Network honored it by adding it to its "Top 100 All Time Christmas Songs". In 2011, Arender performed over 100 shows, called "The Great American Songbook Experience", at Branson, Missouri's Hall of Fame Theatre

In 2012, Arender returned to Las Vegas, where he was approached by friend and performer George Bugatti on behalf of the estate of music composer Harold Arlen managed by his son, Sam Arlen, known for writing the songs of "The Wizard of Oz" and other American standards, such as Frank Sinatra's "One for My Baby", "Somewhere Over the Rainbow", and I've Got the World on a String" , which Sam Arlen had heard him sing online. Following this contact, the Harold Arlen Estate/Yellow Brick Productions hired Arender to perform for their musical "The Wonderful Wizard of Song". Thereafter, Arender became Executive Producer of the show, taking it to New York City, where it became a hit Broadway musical.

While in New York City, Arender created, produced and starred in an original off-Broadway musical at St. Luke's Theatre, entitled "Shea: Prince of Christmas", a Christmas love story which received favorable critical and fan reviews. Arender also performed a concert version of his Christmas Broadway musical for the National Arts Center, in association with the estate of pop artist Andy Warhol and Warhol's Public Relations firm, Jeffrey Richards & Associates, headed by R. Couri Hay.

In 2014, Arender executive produced "The Wonderful Wizard of Song" musical at the Smith Center in Las Vegas and represented Yellow Brick Productions for the 75th Anniversary of the musical soundtrack of the "Wizard of Oz" at the 2014 Tony Awards in New York City.

== New project ==
Shea's latest project is working to hone his original musical style with 7x Grammy-winning Producer/Mixer/Arranger/Writer Steve Thompson and noted Producer/Performer Damon Elliott, the son of Dionne Warwick.

== Discography ==
- 2007: American Trilogy
- 2012: Every Day's Christmas
- 2013: Every Day's Christmas (Broadway Gold Edition)
- 2013: Concert Journey (Live)

== Awards ==
Shea Arender was given an International of Peace Award by the United Nations for his charitable efforts for children around the world. The award was presented to him in Manila, Philippines, by global ambassadors.
