= Las Vegas Symphony Orchestra =

- Also known as: Vegas Symphony
- Genres: symphonic pop, classical music, popular music, movie soundtrack, film score
- Years active: 1985, 2017–present
- Members: Internum Conductor; Steve Rawlins; CEO; Shea Arender
- Website: http://LVSO.Vegas/

The Las Vegas Symphony Orchestra is an American symphony orchestra, based in Las Vegas, Nevada. It was founded in 1985. Originally it was organized only to be a backup for popular Vegas touring headliners. It is sometimes referred to as just simply "Vegas Symphony". The entity was purchased by Broadway producer / entrepreneur Shea Arender on January 5, 2017.
