= Candy Toxton =

American actress

Candy Toxton (November 12, 1925 – December 28, 2005) was an American actress.

== Early life ==
She was born Florence Tockstein on November 12, 1925 in Vienna, Missouri, the eldest of six children of Edward and Teresa Tockstein.

== Personal life ==
She was married to the jazz singer Mel Tormé from February 1949 until their divorce in 1955. They had two children, including the entertainer Steve March-Tormé. Toxton later married the comedian and actor Hal March.

Toxton died at age 80 on December 28, 2005.

== Filmography ==
- Julia Misbehaves (1948) as Girl in Hotel Lobby (uncredited)
- Moonrise (1948) as Minor Role (uncredited)
- The Kissing Bandit (1948) as Bit Role (uncredited)
- Words and Music (1948) as Showgirl (uncredited)
- Act of Violence (1949) as Veteran's Wife (uncredited)
- Knock on Any Door (1949) as Adele Morton (final film role) (credited as Susan Perry)
