= Lyn Stanley =

American jazz singer

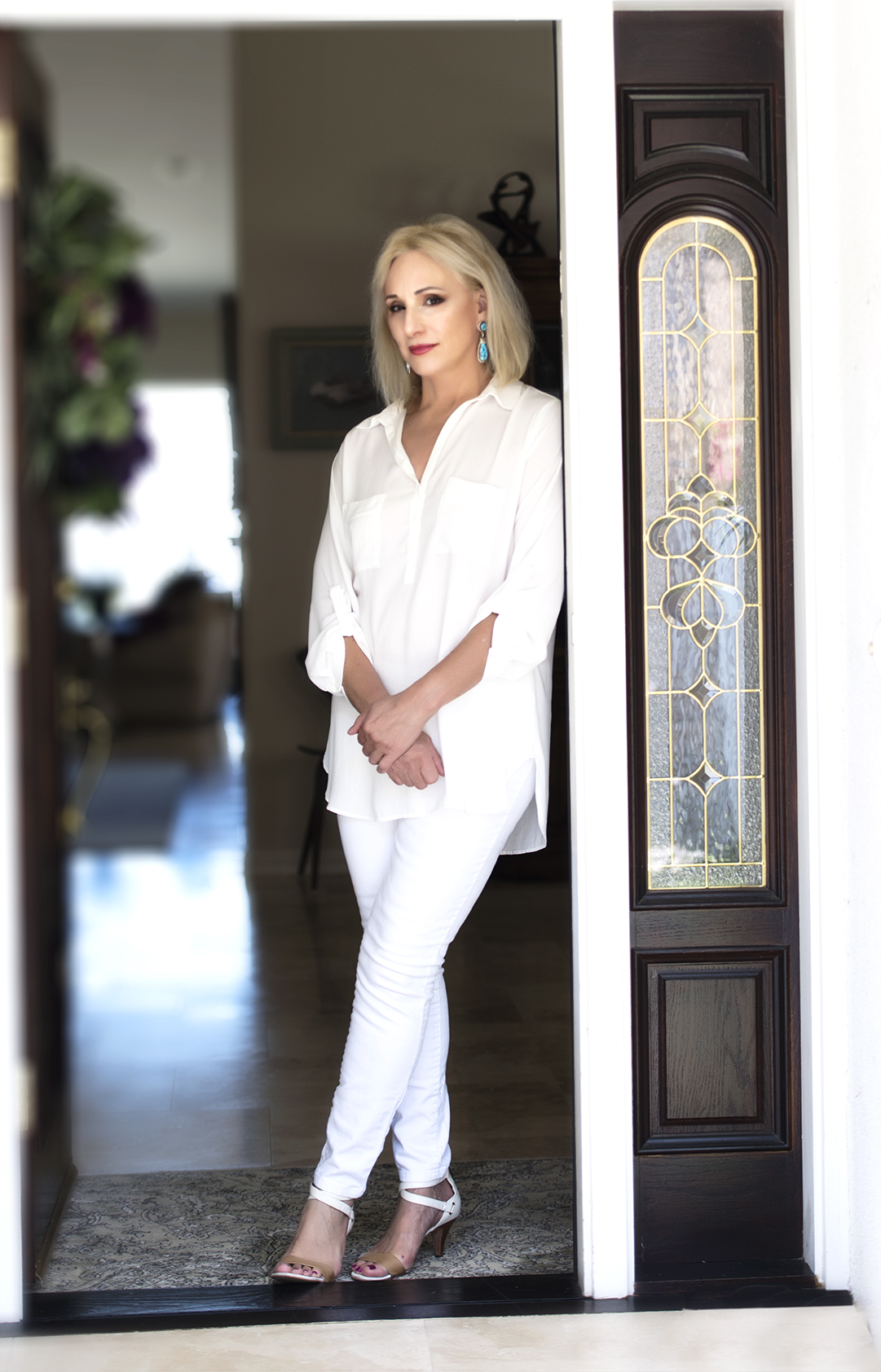
- Recording artist Lyn Stanley at her home.

Background information
- Born: Tacoma, Washington, U.S.
- Genres: Jazz
- Occupations: Singer, producer
- Instrument: Vocals
- Years active: 2013–present
- Label: A.T. Music
- Website: lynstanley.com

Lyn Stanley is an American jazz singer and producer who specializes in audiophile-quality analogue and digital recordings.

== Early life and career ==
Stanley was born in Tacoma, Washington. Her father was a hobby jazz pianist; her grandfather, who emigrated from Bulgaria, was an opera singer.

In 2013, Stanley released her first album, Lost in Romance. Stanley performed songs composed in the 1950s on her second album, Potions (From the 50s). In October 2015 she released her third album, Interludes.

Stanley released The Moonlight Sessions, Volume One and The Moonlight Sessions, Volume Two in 2017. Stanley released both volumes on vinyl, using the One-Step pressing process, and as Super Audio CDs (SACD). The albums were recorded by Al Schmitt and Steve Genewick. Mixing engineer was Michael Bishop of Five/Four Productions, and the album was mastered by Bernie Grundman. Musicians included pianists Mike Garson, Christian Jacob, and Tamir Hendelman; bassist Chuck Berghofer; guitarist John Chiodini; drummers Joe LaBarbera, Bernie Dresel, and Ray Brinker; and soloists Hendrik Meurkens, Rickey Woodard, Chuck Findley, Corky Hale, and Carol Robins.

In 2018, Stanley released her sixth album, London Calling: A Toast to Julie London. Engineers were Steve Genewick for recording and Allen Sides for mixing. The musicians used chord charts rather than full arrangements. Performers included guitarist John Chiodini; pianists Mike Garson and Christian Jacob; drummers/percussionists Luis Conte, Aaron Serfaty, Paul Kreibich, and Brad Dutz; and bassists Chuck Berghofer and Michael Valerio. The 33.3 RPM album received several review accolades, including a five-star review in audiophile magazine The Absolute Sound.

In 2018, British publication HiFi Choice featured Stanley in a discussion of her work and engagement with the audiophile market.

In January 2019, Stanley recorded her seventh album direct to disc: London with a Twist: Live at Bernie's was a follow-up to her Julie London tribute that included London covers and additional songs including "Pink Cadillac." Bernie Grundman mastered the lacquer instantly from the live mix created by Allen Sides. There are over 12 minutes of music on each side with Lyn Stanley performing on each song (with short instrumental interludes). The band, who coined themselves "Jazz Mavericks", are: John Chiodini (guitar) Mike Lang and Otmaro Ruiz (piano), Chuck Berghofer (bass), Luis Conte (percussion), and Aaron Serfaty (drums). The album received several positive reviews.

In 2019 Spotify reported Lyn Stanley's music was played in 76 countries with over 300,000 minutes of download or streaming play. Radio programmer Saul Levine awarded Lyn Stanley Female Jazz Vocalist Of The Year 2018.

In 2020, Stanley released Live At Studio A, recorded live at Capitol Recording Studio A and engineered by Allen Sides and Bernie Grundman. The performance again featured the Jazz Mavericks: John Chiodini, Mike Lang, Chuck Berghofer, Luis Conte, and Aaron Serfaty.

== Discography ==
- Lost in Romance (A.T. Music, 2013)
- Potions (From the 50s) (A.T. Music, 2014)
- Interludes (A.T. Music, 2015)
- The Moonlight Sessions, Volume One (A.T. Music, 2017)
- The Moonlight Sessions, Volume Two (A.T. Music, 2017)
- London Calling: A Toast to Julie London (A.T. Music, 2018)
- London with a Twist: Live at Bernie's (A.T. Music, 2019)
- Live at Studio A (A.T. Music, 2020)
- Novel Noel (A.T. Music, 2022)
