= Come Blow Your Horn =

Play written by Neil Simon

- Program from West End Production
- Written by: Neil Simon
- Original language: English
- Genre: Comedy

Premiere
- Date premiered: February 22, 1961; 65 years ago
- Place premiered: Brooks Atkinson Theatre; Broadway

Come Blow Your Horn is Neil Simon's first play, which premiered on Broadway in 1961 and had a London production in 1962 at the Prince of Wales Theatre. Simon rewrote the script more than two dozen times over several years, resulting in a hit premiere that allowed Simon to leave his full-time television writing career to write stage and film scripts.

== Productions ==
Come Blow Your Horn opened on Broadway at the Brooks Atkinson Theatre on February 22, 1961 and closed on October 6, 1962 after 677 performances and one preview. The cast featured Hal March (Alan Baker), Arlene Golonka, Warren Berlinger (Buddy), Lou Jacobi (Mr. Baker) and Pert Kelton (Mrs. Baker). The director was Stanley Prager, with sets and lighting by Ralph Alswang. It was produced by Arthur Cantor.

The play opened in the West End in 1962 at the Prince of Wales Theatre, starring Michael Crawford as Buddy, Bob Monkhouse and David Kossoff. The following year the play was the first production to take place at the Wayside Theatre.

The play was revived at the Jewish Repertory Theater, New York City, running in December 1987.

In June 2005, Jacob Murray directed a production at the Royal Exchange, Manchester with Jamie Glover as Alan Baker, Andrew Langtree as Buddy Baker, Malcolm Rennie as Mr Baker and Amanda Boxer as Mrs Baker.

== Plot overview ==
The play tells the story of a young man's decision to leave the home of his parents for the bachelor pad of his older brother who leads a swinging '60s lifestyle. Buddy is a 21-year-old virgin and his older brother Alan is a ladies' man. Alan lives in an apartment in the East Sixties, New York City.

As the play progresses, Alan discovers feelings for one of the many women with whom he is sleeping, and when she leaves him, he falls apart. This juxtaposes Alan's hunger for companionship with Buddy's metamorphosis into a ladies' man. The playwright points out the fundamental spiritual and emotional emptiness of the playboy lifestyle for which the younger sibling desperately yearns.

Characters

- Alan Baker
- Peggy Evans
- Buddy Baker
- Mr. Baker (Father)
- Connie
- Mrs. Baker (Mother)

== Film adaptation ==
The play was made into a 1963 film, starring Frank Sinatra as Alan and Tony Bill as Buddy.

== Inspiration ==
Simon modeled the onstage parents on his mother and father.

== Reception ==
Howard Taubman, in his review for The New York Times, wrote that the play was "smoothly plotted and deftly written...Mr. Simon has served up a multitude of sprightly lines. Best of all, he has provided some explosively hilarious moments rooted in character."
