= Mel Tormé =

American recording artist (1925–1999)

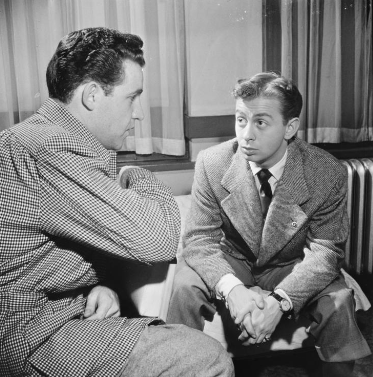
- Portrait of Tormé (right), New York City, c. 1947; by William P. Gottlieb

Background information
- Also known as: The Velvet Fog
- Born: Melvin Howard Tormé; September 13, 1925; Chicago, Illinois, U.S.
- Died: June 5, 1999 (aged 73) Los Angeles, California, U.S.
- Genres: Traditional pop, jazz
- Occupations: Singer; musician; composer; arranger; actor; author
- Instruments: Vocals; drums; piano; ukulele
- Years active: 1929–1996
- Labels: Decca, Musicraft, Capitol, Bethlehem, Columbia, Concord
- Formerly of: Artie Shaw, Marty Paich, George Shearing
- Spouses: Candy Toxton (m. 1949; div. 1955) Arlene Miles (m. 1956; div. 1965) Janette Scott (m. 1966; div. 1977) Ali Severson (m. 1984)

Melvin Howard Tormé (September 13, 1925 – June 5, 1999), nicknamed "The Velvet Fog", was an American musician, singer, composer, arranger, drummer, actor, and author. He composed the music for "The Christmas Song" ("Chestnuts Roasting on an Open Fire") and co-wrote the lyrics with Bob Wells. Tormé won two Grammy Awards and was nominated a total of 14 times.

== Early life and education ==
Melvin Howard Tormé was born in Chicago, Illinois, to a Jewish family. His father, William David Tormé, (born Wowe Torma, also spelled as Tarme or Tarmo), was an immigrant from Brest (now Belarus), and Sarah "Betty" Tormé (née Sopkin), was a New York City native. Named after the actor Melvyn Douglas, Tormé grew up in a home filled with music and entertainment. His father, whom he recalled as having the pure voice of a cantor, had been an amateur dancer in his youth. His aunt Faye Tormé had risen to local fame in Chicago, where, dubbed the "Wonder Frisco Dancer," she raised money by dancing at war bond rallies in 1917–18. Mel's only formal musical education came from his Uncle Al Tormé, who played the ukulele and the Albert system clarinet. His only sibling, Myrna, was born a few weeks before his fourth birthday.

Tormé grew up in a largely Black neighborhood and was heavily influenced by jazz. A child prodigy, he first performed professionally at age 4 with the Coon-Sanders Orchestra, singing "You're Driving Me Crazy," a song he had learned on the radio, at Chicago's Blackhawk restaurant. He was invited back and sang every Monday night for six months; he was paid $15 a night with a free dinner for his family.

By 1931, during the Great Depression, his father had lost his store and began work as a salesman, while his mother worked as a seamstress. The family moved to the South Side to live with his grandparents. His grandmother hired a black woman named Alberta to look after Mel and his sister during the day. On Friday and Saturday nights, Alberta played piano in a five-piece jazz band at the famed Savoy Ballroom. Tormé later recalled of Alberta: "She had it all, the syncopation, the jazz conception, the deep feeling in her singing, the deliciously dissonant chords she played. She exposed me to all of it, and I ingested her musicality by some process of osmosis."

To contribute to the family, he played drums in the drum-and-bugle corps at Shakespeare Elementary School. From 1933 to 1941, he acted in the radio programs The Romance of Helen Trent and Jack Armstrong, the All-American Boy. He wrote his first song at 13. Three years later his first published song, "Lament to Love", became a hit for bandleader Harry James.

He graduated from Hyde Park High School.

== Career ==
=== Jazz music ===
From 1942 to 1943, he was a member of a band led by Chico Marx of the Marx Brothers. He was the singer and drummer and also created some arrangements. In 1943, Tormé made his movie debut in Frank Sinatra's first film, the musical Higher and Higher. His appearance in the 1947 film musical Good News made him a teen idol.

In 1944, he formed the vocal quintet Mel Tormé and His Mel-Tones, modeled on Frank Sinatra and The Pied Pipers. The Mel-Tones, which included Les Baxter and Ginny O'Connor, had several hits fronting Artie Shaw's band and on their own, including Cole Porter's "What Is This Thing Called Love?" The Mel-Tones were among the first jazz-influenced vocal groups, blazing a path later followed by The Hi-Lo's, The Four Freshmen, The Singers Unlimited, and The Manhattan Transfer.

Tormé was discharged from the United States Army in 1946 and soon returned to a life of radio, TV, movies, and music. In 1947, he started a solo singing career. His appearances at New York's Copacabana led local disc jockey Fred Robbins to give him the nickname “the Velvet Fog” in honor of his high tenor and smooth vocal style. Tormé detested the nickname. He self-deprecatingly referred to it as "this Velvet Frog voice". As a solo singer, he recorded several romantic hits for Decca and with the Artie Shaw Orchestra for Musicraft (1946–48). In 1949, he moved to Capitol, where his first record, "Careless Hands", became his only No. 1 hit. His versions of "Again" and "Blue Moon" became signature songs. His composition California Suite, prompted by Gordon Jenkins's "Manhattan Tower", became Capitol's first 12-inch LP album. Around this time, he helped pioneer cool jazz.

His radio program, Mel Tormé Time, appeared on the short-lived Progressive Broadcasting System in the 1950s.

From 1955 to 1957, he recorded seven vocal jazz albums for Red Clyde's Bethlehem Records, all with groups led by Marty Paich, most notably Mel Tormé and the Marty Paich Dek-Tette. He became known for his arranging skills, earning the respect of musicians.

In his 1994 book My Singing Teachers, Tormé cited Patty Andrews, lead singer of the Andrews Sisters, one of the most successful show business acts of the 1940s, as one of his favorite vocalists, saying:

They had more hit records to their credit than you could count, and one of the main reasons for their popularity was Patty Andrews. She stood in the middle of her sisters, planted her feet apart, and belted out solos as well as singing the lead parts with zest and confidence. The kind of singing she did cannot be taught, it can't be studied in books, it can't be written down. Long experience as a singer and wide-open ears were her only teachers, and she learned her lessons well.

Though he spent most of his career singing jazz, Tormé had a deep appreciation for classical music, especially that of Frederick Delius and Percy Grainger. Rock and roll he considered "three-chord manure".

In the 1960s and '70s, Tormé covered pop tunes of the day, never staying long with one label. He had two minor hits in the latter part of his career: his 1956 recording of "Mountain Greenery", which did better in the United Kingdom, reaching No. 4 (while not charting in the U.S.); and his 1962 R&B song "Comin' Home Baby", arranged by Claus Ogerman, which reached No. 13 in the UK. The latter recording led the jazz and gospel singer Ethel Waters to say that "Tormé is the only white man who sings with the soul of a black man." "Comin' Home Baby" was later covered by Quincy Jones and Kai Winding.

=== Television ===
In 1960, Tormé appeared in the TV crime drama Dan Raven with Don Dubbins. He had a role in a cross-cultural western titled Walk Like a Dragon, starring Jack Lord. He played "The Deacon", a bible-quoting gunfighter who protects a female saloon owner and teaches a young Chinese man the art of the fast draw. In one scene, he tells a soon-to-be victim: "Say your prayers, brother Masters. You're a corpse," then delivers on the promise. Like Sammy Davis Jr. and Robert Fuller, Tormé was a real-life fast draw expert. He also sang the show's theme song.

In 1963–1964, Tormé wrote songs and arrangements for The Judy Garland Show, where he made three guest appearances. When he and Garland had a dispute, he was fired. A few years later, after Garland's death, his time with her show became the subject of his first book, The Other Side of the Rainbow with Judy Garland on the Dawn Patrol (1970). Although the book was praised, some felt it painted an excessively unflattering picture of Garland and that Tormé had exaggerated his contributions to the program; it led to an unsuccessful lawsuit by Garland's family.

In 1967, he appeared with Lucille Ball in a two-part episode of The Lucy Show — "Main Street U.S.A." — as Mel Tinker, a songwriter who hopes to preserve the character of his small town. Tormé also wrote the song that gave the episode its title, and he performs it with Ball.

Tormé made nine guest appearances as himself (and one as a guardian angel) on the 1980s situation comedy Night Court. The main character, Judge Harry Stone, played by Harry Anderson, was depicted as an unabashed Tormé fan, an admiration that Anderson shared in real life; he would deliver the eulogy at Tormé's funeral. Tormé appeared in Mountain Dew commercials and in a 1995 episode of the sitcom Seinfeld ("The Jimmy") as himself. He recorded a version of Nat King Cole's "Straighten Up and Fly Right" with his son, singer Steve March-Tormé. He worked with his other son, television writer-producer Tracy Tormé, on Sliders. The 1996 episode, titled "Greatfellas," featured Tormé as a version of himself from a parallel universe in which he is a country music singer who is also an FBI informant.

Tormé provided the singing voice of Daffy Duck in the 1988 Warner Bros. cartoon The Night of the Living Duck. On December 31, 1988, Tormé hosted a two-hour variety show titled Happy New Year, U. S. A. on PBS television.

=== Resurgence ===
The resurgence of vocal jazz in the 1970s resulted in a successful period for Tormé. His live performances restored his reputation as a jazz singer. He performed as often as 200 times a year in venues all over the world. In 1976, he won an Edison Award (the Dutch equivalent of the Grammy) for best male singer, and a DownBeat award for best male jazz singer. For several years, his appearances at Michael's Pub on the Upper East Side would unofficially open New York's fall cabaret season.

During the 1980s and 1990s he performed often with George Shearing, recording six albums together for Concord Records. About this period Shearing wrote:

It is impossible to imagine a more compatible musical partner... I humbly put forth that Mel and I had the best musical marriage in many a year. We literally breathed together during our countless performances. As Mel put it, we were two bodies of one musical mind.

He reunited with Marty Paich for a tour and the albums Mel Tormé and the Marty Paich Dektette – In Concert Tokyo and Mel Tormé and the Marty Paich Dektette – Reunion. He performed with Rob McConnell's big band and recorded Mel Tormé, Rob McConnell and the Boss Brass. In 1995 he toured with Ken Peplowski. For much of the later period of his career, Mel's trio consisted of John Colianni, piano; John Leitham, bass; and Donny Osborne, drums. With this group, Tormé recorded six albums and toured internationally. In some instances, Mel and this group were joined by Doc Severinsen and his Orchestra, Maureen McGovern, and Cleo Laine/John Dankworth. Guest conductors on symphonic gigs included Bob Krogstad and Keith Lockhart.

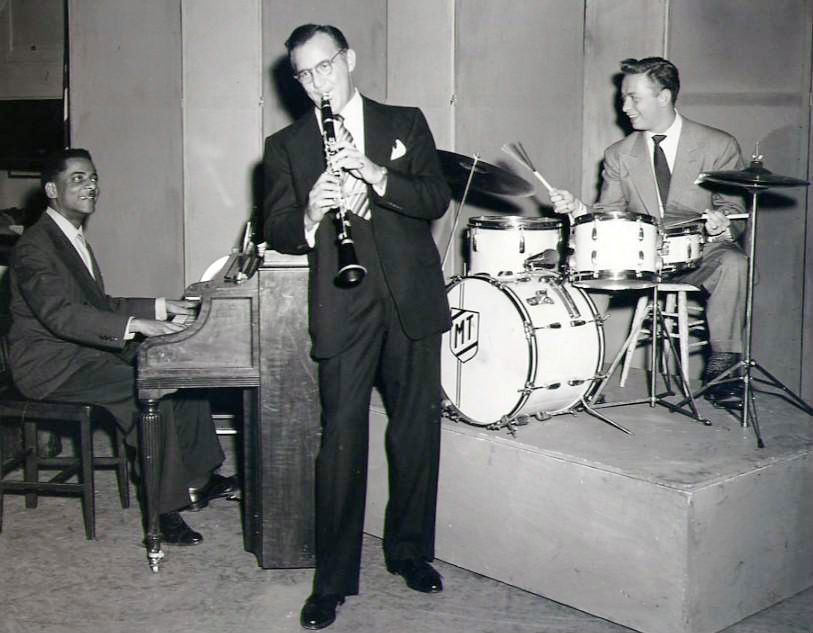
Tormé on drums with Benny Goodman and Teddy Wilson

Tormé made a guest vocal appearance on the 1983 album Born to Laugh at Tornadoes by the progressive pop band Was (Not Was). Tormé sang the satiric jazz song "Zaz Turned Blue" about a teenager who is choked as part of an erotic asphyxiation ("Steve squeezed his neck/He figured what the heck") – and who may or may not have suffered brain damage as a result ("Now he plays lots of pool/And as a rule/He wears a silly grin/On his chin").

In 1991 Tormé published Traps, the Drum Wonder, a biography of drummer Buddy Rich, who was his friend since Rich left the Marines in 1944. Tormé also owned and played a drum set that drummer Gene Krupa used for many years. George Spink, treasurer of the Jazz Institute of Chicago from 1978 - 1981, recalled that Tormé played this drum set at the 1979 Chicago Jazz Festival with Benny Goodman on "Sing, Sing, Sing".

=== Writing, songwriting and recordings ===
Tormé's non-fiction books include The Other Side of the Rainbow (1970), a memoir of his time as musical adviser for Judy Garland's television show; Traps, the Drum Wonder (1991), a biography of Buddy Rich; My Singing Teachers: Reflections on Singing Popular Music (1994); and It Wasn't All Velvet (1988), his autobiography. He also published a novel, Wynner (1978); wrote one episode apiece of the 1960s TV series Run For Your Life and The Virginian; and received a "story by" credit on a 1974 episode of Mannix.

Tormé wrote more than 250 songs, several of which became standards. He often wrote the arrangements for the songs he sang. He collaborated with Bob Wells on his most popular composition, "The Christmas Song" (1946). They wrote the song on a swelteringly hot and sunny day in California, sitting down and coming up with all the most 'mid-wintery' things they could think of, in an attempt to cool themselves down; it was recorded first by Nat King Cole. Tormé said that he wrote the music in 45 minutes and that it was not one of his favorites, calling it "my annuity".

== Personal life ==
Mel Tormé was married four times, first to Candy Toxton (1949–1955); second to Arlene Miles (1956–1965); third to Janette Scott, Thora Hird's daughter (1966–1977); and last to Ali Severson (from 1984 to his death in 1999). All his marriages except the last one ended in divorce. Tormé was survived by his wife Ali; five children: Steve March-Tormé, Melissa Tormé-March, and Tracy, Daisy, and James Tormé; and two stepchildren: Carrie Tormé and Kurt. Tracy was a screenwriter and producer. James Tormé is a jazz vocalist based in Los Angeles, California. Steve March-Tormé is also a musician who lives and works in Appleton, Wisconsin.

=== Illness and death ===
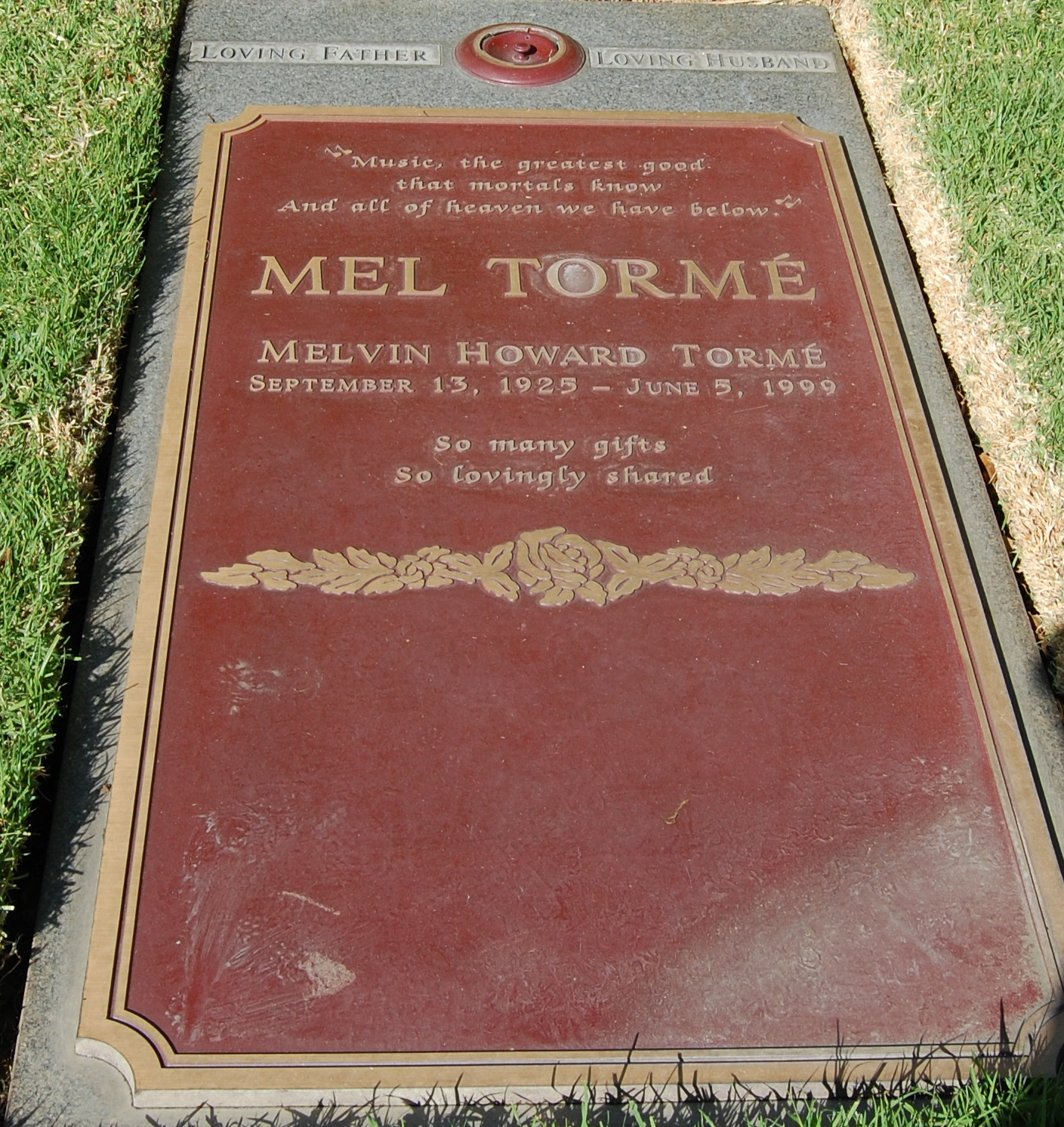
Tormé's grave

On August 8, 1996, a stroke ended Tormé's 65-year singing career. In February 1999, he was awarded the Grammy Lifetime Achievement Award. He died from another stroke on June 5, 1999, at the age of 73. He is buried at the Westwood Village Memorial Park Cemetery in Los Angeles. In his eulogistic essay, John Andrews wrote:

Tormé's style shared much with that of his idol, Ella Fitzgerald. Both were firmly rooted in the foundation of the swing era, but both seemed able to incorporate bebop innovations to keep their performances sounding fresh and contemporary. Like Sinatra, they sang with perfect diction and brought out the emotional content of the lyrics through subtle alterations of phrasing and harmony. Ballads were characterized by paraphrasing of the original melody which always seemed tasteful, appropriate and respectful to the vision of the songwriter. Unlike Sinatra, both Fitzgerald and Tormé were likely to cut loose during a swinging up-tempo number with several scat choruses, using their voices without words to improvise a solo like a brass or reed instrument.

== Films ==
- Higher and Higher (1943)
- Ghost Catchers (1944)
- Pardon My Rhythm (1944)
- Resisting Enemy Interrogation (1944)
- Let's Go Steady (1945)
- Junior Miss (1945)
- The Crimson Canary (1945) (drums dubber)
- Night and Day (1946) (drummer at rehearsal)
- Janie Gets Married (1946)
- Good News (1947)
- Words and Music (1948)
- Duchess of Idaho (1950)
- The Fearmakers (1958)
- The Big Operator (1959)
- Girls Town (1959)
- Walk Like a Dragon (1960)
- The Private Lives of Adam and Eve (1960)
- The Patsy (1964) (Cameo)
- A Man Called Adam (1966) (Cameo)
- Land of No Return (1978)
- Artie Shaw: Time Is All You've Got (1985) (documentary)
- The Night of the Living Duck (1988) (short subject) (voice)
- Daffy Duck's Quackbusters (1988) (voice)
- The Naked Gun 2½: The Smell of Fear (1991) (Cameo)

== Television ==
- The Mel Tormé Show (1951–1952)
- TV's Top Tunes (host in 1951)
- Faye Emerson's Wonderful Town (1 episode, 1952)
- Summertime U.S.A. (1953)
- The Nat King Cole Show (July 9, 1957)
- The Comedian (1957) (written by Rod Serling, directed by John Frankenheimer)
- Playhouse 90, as Lester Hogarth in "The Comedian" (1957)
- The Pat Boone Chevy Showroom (January 7, 1960)
- U.S. Marshal, as Johnny Fleck in "The Man Who Lived Twice" (1960)
- Judy Garland Christmas Special (1963)
- To Tell the Truth (panelist, 1964)
- The Lucy Show as Mel Tinker (3 episodes, 1965–1967)
- The Sammy Davis Jr. Show (March 11, 1966)
- Run for Your Life, with Ben Gazzara (episode writer)
- You Don't Say! (guest, 1967)
- The Virginian (special guest, episode writer, 1968)
- The Bold Ones: The Lawyers - episode "The Crowd Pleaser" (November 2, 1969)
- The Carol Burnett Show (9 episodes)

Season 1 Episode 25 (March 4, 1968); Season 2 Episode 7 (November 11, 1968); Season 2 Episode 16 (January 27, 1969); Season 3 Episode 17 (January 26, 1970); Season 3 Episode 23 (March 23, 1970); Season 4 Episode 9 (October 19, 1970); Season 4 Episode 11 (December 7, 1970); Season 4 Episode 18 (January 18, 1971); Season 5 Episode 11 (November 17, 1971)

- It Was a Very Good Year (1971) (Summer replacement series)
- Chase, as Cyclops in "$35 Will Fly You to the Moon" (1974)
- The Merv Griffin Show (3 guest appearances, 1976–1979)
- The Christmas Songs (1979) (Host, Performer) (PBS Christmas variety show)
- Pray TV (1982) (Cameo)
- Hotel (1983) (pilot for series) (Cameo)
- Night Court (10 guest appearances 1986–1992, most as himself)
- A Spinal Tap Reunion: The 25th Anniversary London Sell-Out (1992)
- Pops Goes the Fourth (1995)
- Seinfeld – "The Jimmy" (1995)
- Sliders – "Greatfellas" (1996)
- Happy New Year, U. S. A. December 31 PBS -Citation needed

== Family ==
Children and stepchildren:

- Steve March-Tormé (b. 1953), singer-songwriter
- Melissa Torme-March (b. 1955), actress
- Tracy Tormé (1959–2024), screenwriter and film producer
- Daisy Tormé (b. 1969), singer, actress, broadcaster
- James Tormé (b. 1973), singer
- Carrie Tormé (1960–2017)
- Kurt Goldsmith (b. 1963)
