= TxtWeb =

- Original author: Scott Cook
- Developer: Manish Shah
- Release: 2011
- Type: Application framework

txtWeb was a SMS text-based application platform for non-smartphone users residing primarily in rural India. It was founded by Scott Cook, Manish Shah, Manish Maheshwari and Clinton Nielsen. The founders jointly hold the US patent on “Method and system for providing a stateful experience while accessing content using a global textsite platform” , which forms the core of the txtWeb platform.

It brought the benefit of the World Wide Web through text-based apps (hence, txtWeb), which were crowd-sourced from local businesses, publishers, and developers supported by the payment solution, txtPay. This platform was launched in 2011 and it grew to 12 million users and 1 billion transactions by 2014. It became the subject of GSMA's global case study on empowerment through information and won the NASSCOM and mBillionth 2012 Award for Innovation.

One of the interns in the txtWeb team was Evan Spiegel, who went on to create Snapchat (later rebranded as Snap).

== Timeline ==
TxtWeb was founded in 2011.

By 2014, the platform had over 12 million users, 3000 apps and was used across 400 towns and villages in India.

It was shut down around 2015 as smartphones became ubiquitous and data plans became affordable in emerging markets.
