= Snapchat dysmorphia =

Psychological phenomenon

Snapchat dysmorphia, also known as selfie dysmorphia, is a term used to describe patients who seek out plastic surgery in order to look like their filtered selfies or altered images of themselves. The increasing availability and variety of filters used on social media apps, such as Snapchat or Instagram, allow users to edit and apply filters to their photos in an instant – unblemish the skin, narrow the nose, enlarge the eyes, and make numerous other edits to one's facial features. These heavily edited images create unrealistic and unnatural expectations of one's appearance, showing users a "perfected" view of themselves. The disconnect between one's real-life appearance and the highly altered versions of oneself manifest into body insecurity and dysmorphia. This distorted perception of oneself can potentially evolve into an obsessive preoccupation with perceived flaws in one's appearance, a mental disorder known as body dysmorphic disorder (or BDD). BDD has been classified as part of the obsessive-compulsive spectrum and it is estimated to affect one in 50 Americans.

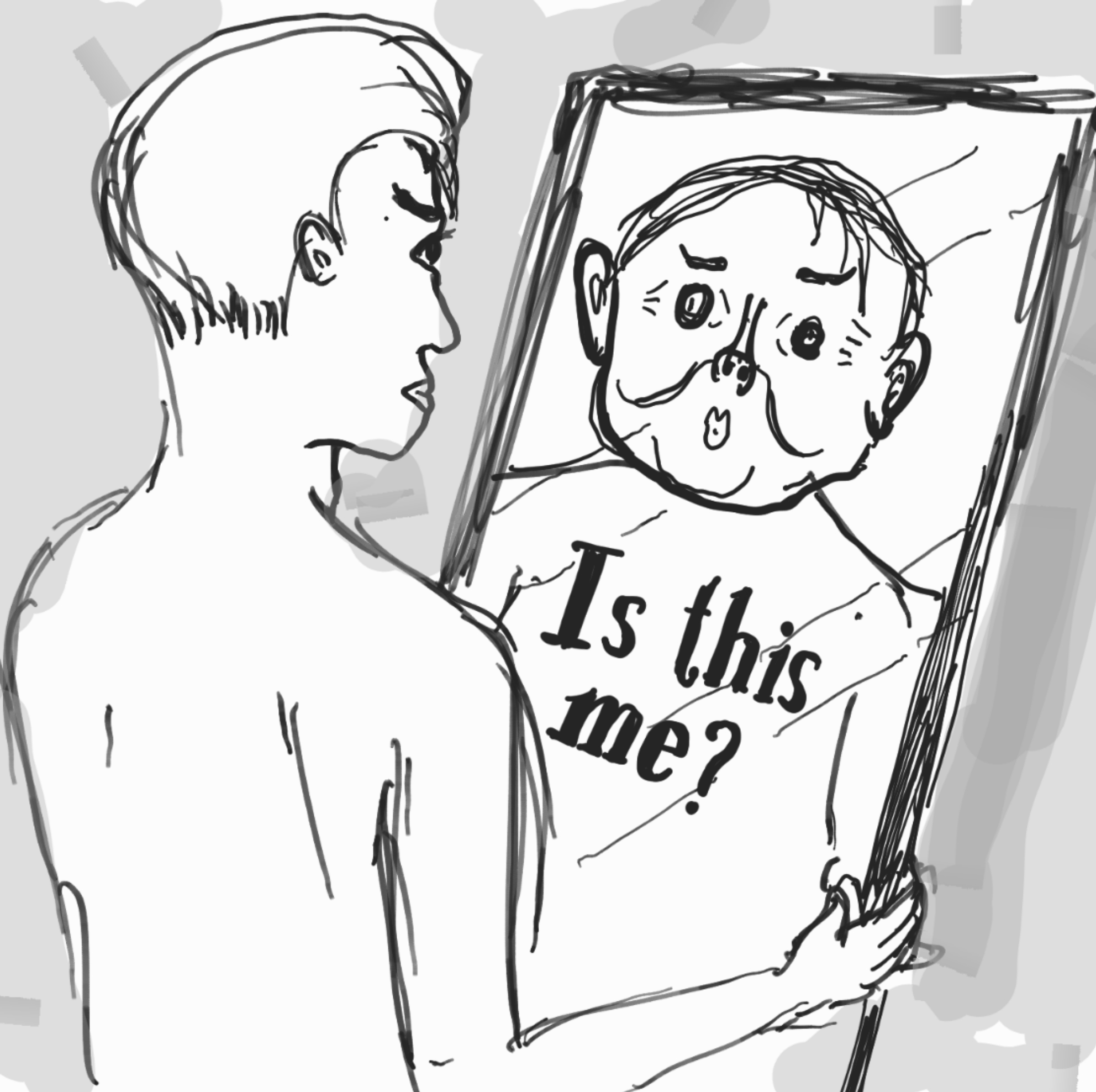
Illustration of body dysmorphic disorder (BDD)

== Relationship between social media use and cosmetic surgery ==
In 2018, many newspaper outlets questioned the rising impact of social media applications on the choice of plastic surgeries for users. Researchers from the Boston Medical Center (BMC) wrote in a JAMA Facial Plastic Surgery essay that with the rise of Snapchat in 2011, there have been increasing numbers of patients going into the cosmetic doctors' offices to request surgeries to make them look more similar to how they appear through Snapchat filters. The pressure to achieve an impossible facial appearance may be a causal factor in triggering BDD, which in turn frequently leads to seeking out cosmetic surgery. Based on 2022 survey results from the American Academy of Facial Plastic and Reconstructive Surgery (AAFPRS), 79% of plastic surgeons reported patients seeking improvement in their physical appearances with the desire to look better in selfies.

The British cosmetic surgeon Tijion Esho coined the term "Snapchat Dysmorphia" to explain the increasing trend of patients seeking cosmetic surgeries to achieve the filtered versions of themselves. Esho noticed that with the rising popularity of photo filters on social media platforms, more patients were coming into consultations with filtered images of themselves. In the past, patients would come to clinics with photos of celebrities or models they wanted to look like, but patients were now making use of their heavily edited selfies as references for their cosmetic procedures.

One study found that users who engage with image-heavy social media platforms (such as Instagram) are more likely to consider undergoing plastic surgery.

== Negative impact on adolescents ==
Because of the prevalence of digital imaging and sharing, members of the "selfie generation" can hyper-fixate and obsess over minor or even nonexistent flaws in their appearance, which can lead to lower self-esteem and higher self-dissatisfaction as well as dysmorphia. Social media platforms provide users with an online space to not only control the ways in which they present themselves but also go as far as to curate idealized versions of themselves. These filters reinforce a new standard of unattainable beauty, including "Instagram Face", in which users can adjust their facial features and conform to an unrealistic version of themselves through social media: high cheekbones, poreless skin, cat-like eyes, plump lips, and a small nose.

In recent years, the widespread use of filters has contributed to psychological impacts in young girls because they are among the most frequent users. Often girls will compare themselves to their filtered photos, resulting in feelings of inadequacy and dissatisfaction. This phenomenon has been linked to lower self-esteem, body image issues, and worsening mental health like anxiety and depression. Young people, especially adolescent girls, are using these filters through social media that "beautify" their looks, which promise to deliver an enhanced version of their appearance. Specifically, with the rise of selfie culture, Snapchat claimed that there are "200 million daily active users that play with or view Lenses every day to transform the way they look", with more than 90% of young people in the U.S., France, and the U.K. currently using Snapchat filters. Body image expert Jasmine Fardouly, argues that there is a strong relationship between negative body image and the use of photo editing. Social media provides users with the tools to control how they appear online, and the constant investigation into one's self-presentation and alteration of one's images can be harmful to users' self-esteem and body satisfaction. McLean et al. (2015) showed that adolescent girls who had higher engagement in manipulation of and investment in self-images tend to be more preoccupied with their appearance and body image, as well as association with greater eating and body-related concerns.

According to research with the Dove Self-Esteem Project, 60% of young girls felt upset that their actual appearance did not match the online, retouched version of themselves. These girls who dedicated much time to photo editing felt more anxious, less confident, and less physically attractive after comparing themselves to their idealized versions of themselves. This conflicting gap between idealized expectations and the harsh realities of appearance can lead to BDD, and BDD can often lead to mental health issues, including depression, anxiety disorders, substance abuse, and suicidal behavior. By the age of 13, 80% of young girls manipulate and distort the way they look online through face-altering and editing filters. Adolescents are at high risk of depression, body image concerns, and eating disorders through social media usage—with 52% of girls using social media filters every day.

Recent research also suggests that AI-driven content on social media platforms may intensify Snapchat dysmorphia by repeatedly exposing users to idealized and filtered facial images. This exposure can make altered appearances feel more familiar than natural ones, potentially reinforcing distorted self-perception and increasing dissatisfaction with one’s real appearance.

== Prevention ==
With the rising debate about the potential negative impacts of social media filters and the increasing awareness of body dysmorphia, social media filters were heavily criticized for simulating explicit distortion effects to promote cosmetic surgeries. Third-party filters on Instagram such as FixMe allowed users to annotate their faces similar to how cosmetic surgeons may mark up areas for surgical improvement. After a public controversy around these distorted filters, in August 2020, a new policy banned filters that directly promoted cosmetic surgery.

Meta, which operates Facebook, Instagram, Threads, and WhatsApp, has made minimal attempts to restrict the use of distortion effects and filters through social media. Facial distortion filters no longer appear in Instagram's "Effects Gallery", which displays the most popular filters at that time. Any effects or augmented reality (AR) filters that explicitly encourage cosmetic surgery are not allowed on Instagram, as research has shown that face-altering filters can make users feel worse about their appearance.

Dove's #NoDigitalDistortion campaign project supports young adolescents in building self-confidence and positive body image on social media. For example, the Dove Self-Esteem Project created a Confidence Kit: an online resource guide for discussions surrounding social media usage and body image with young people.

A study in JAMA Facial Plastic Surgery has also emphasized the need for plastic surgeons to screen their patients for BDD before undergoing surgical procedures to check for underlying problems of body dysmorphia. Cosmetic surgery is not a solution or treatment for BDD and it is important for cosmetic surgeons to provide interventions and discussions around achievable aesthetic goals.
