= Manish Maheshwari =

Indian Entrepreneur

- मनीष माहेश्वरी
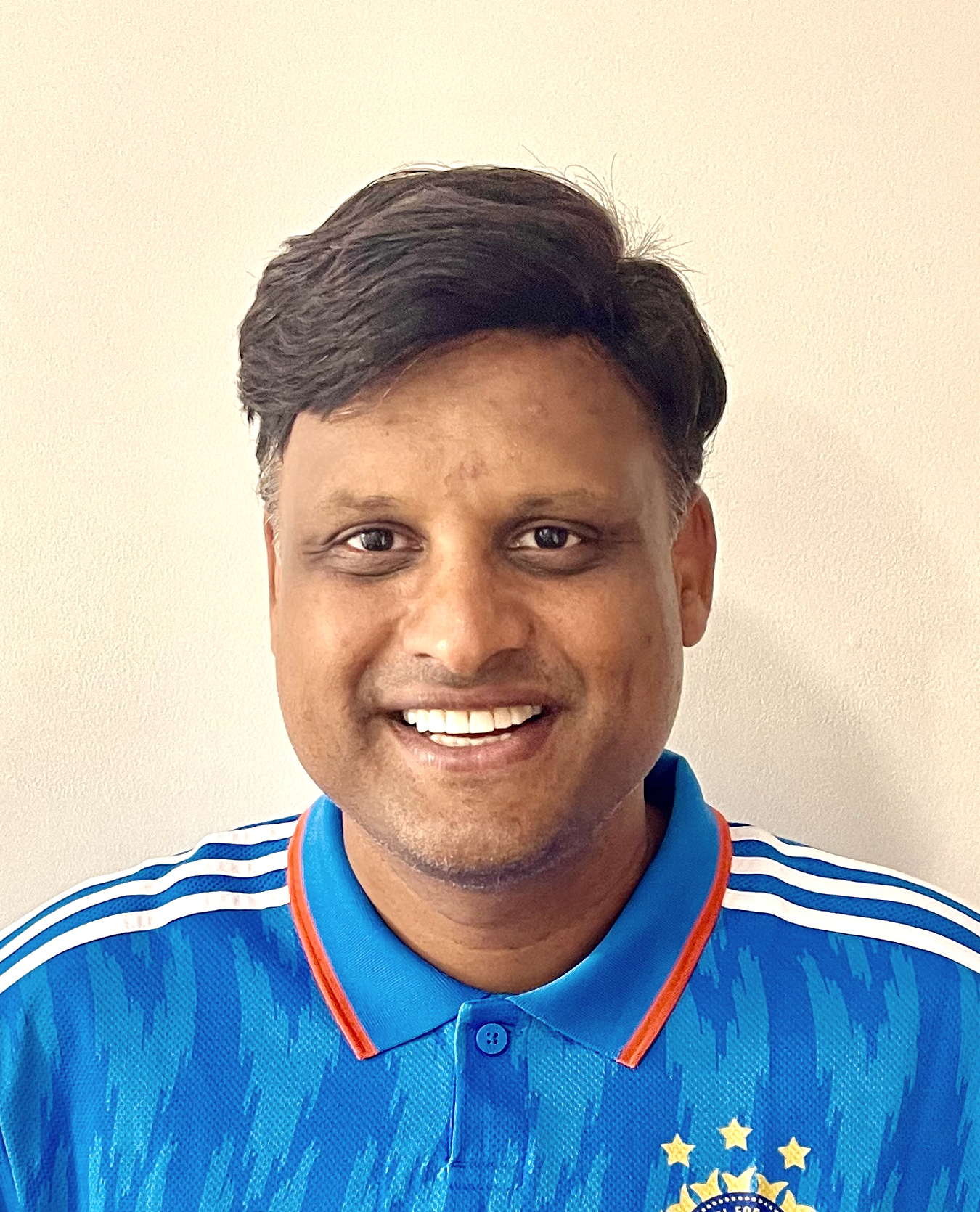
- Maheshwari in 2023
- Born: Tatanagar, India
- Education: (B.com hons) SRCC, Delhi University; (M.B.A) Wharton School, University of Pennsylvania; (M.P.A) Harvard Kennedy School, Harvard University
- Occupations: Country Business Head, India, Stripe, Inc. Mason Fellow, Harvard Kennedy School; Co-Founder, Fanory.ai; Former Head of Twitter India; Former CEO-Digital of Network18

Manish Maheshwari is an Indian technology executive, entrepreneur, and investor. He is a Mason Fellow from Harvard University, with a focus on Artificial Intelligence (AI). He currently leads growth and revenues for Stripe across the India-US cross-border corridor.

He earlier co-founded Fanory.ai, an AI-enabled "Shopify for creators". Fanory.ai was acquired by JetSynthesys. It had received a majority investment from JetSynthesys and backed by the family offices of cricketing legend, Sachin Tendulkar, Serum Institute's Adar Poonawalla and Infosys co-founder, Kris Gopalakrishnan.

Prior to Fanory.ai, Maheshwari was the head of Twitter India. Prior to Twitter, he was the CEO of Network18 Digital. He has also worked with Intuit, Flipkart, Procter & Gamble, and McKinsey.

Maheshwari was elected to serve on the Governing Council of the Internet and Mobile Association of India (IAMAI). He additionally served on the Executive Council as a Treasurer, a role of significant national responsibility.

After earning an MBA with honors from the Wharton School at the University of Pennsylvania, supported by a Ford Research Fellowship, Maheshwari briefly worked as a consultant with McKinsey & Company, where he advised the Government of India on higher education system reforms.

Maheshwari is a TEDx speaker, a MENSA member, and a PADI-certified diver.

== Early life and education ==
Maheshwari went to Shri Ram College Commerce at the University of Delhi for undergraduate education. There, he served as editor for the college magazine. He won the student body elections and served as the president of the History & Political Science Society. He has also won the Principal Madan Mohan Medal.

In 2004, the Wharton School at the University of Pennsylvania accepted him into the two-year full-time MBA program. There he was elected co-president of the Asia Club, one of the largest student-run clubs on campus. During the summer break, he volunteered in East Timor under the Wharton International Volunteer Program. He graduated with honours while also winning the Shils-Zeidman Award, the highest award for entrepreneurship at Wharton.

== Career ==
Maheshwari began his career with Procter & Gamble (P&G) in Mumbai where he worked on the business of Vicks brand.

After earning MBA at Wharton, he started at McKinsey & Company in New York, where he advised Fortune 500 companies on new market entry and growth strategies for emerging markets. He then moved to the Bay Area to join Intuit, a consumer software company headquartered in Mountain View, California. There he worked with Intuit's founder, Scott Cook and Intuit engineers, Manish Shah and Clinton Nielsen to explore a text-based mobile platform for information and news. In 2011, he, along with Scott Cook, Manish Shah and Clinton Nielsen, co-founded txtWeb, an app development platform for which they hold a patent issued by United States Patent & Trademark Office.

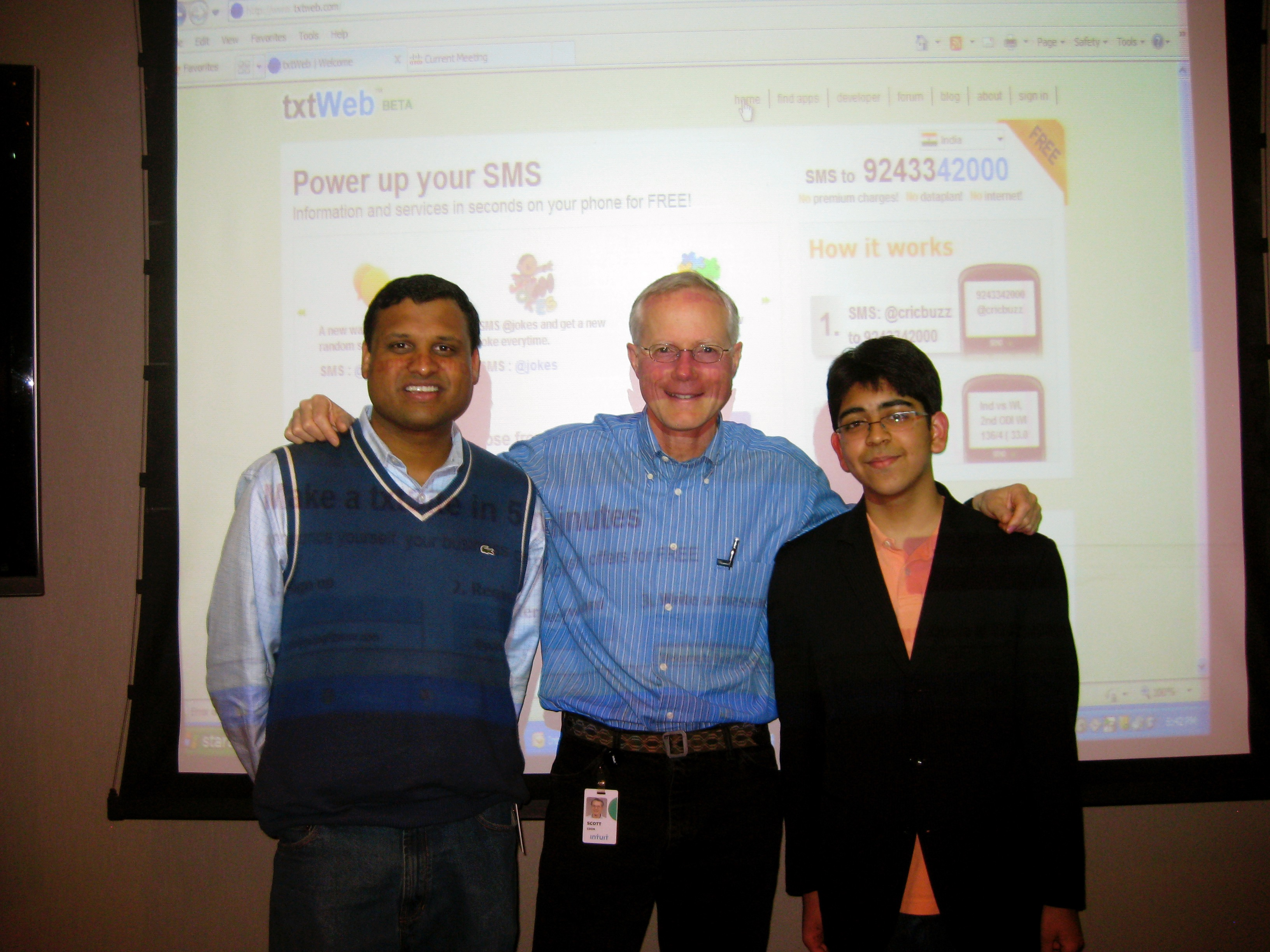
Maheshwari (left) with Intuit founder, Scott Cook (middle) during early days of TxtWeb in 2011

At its peak, txtWeb had over 11 million users using one or more of the 3500 active apps built by developers and businesses. It grew to 1 billion transactions by 2014. It was recognised by GSMA as a global case study on empowerment through access to information. India Today magazine recognized Maheshwari as one of India's top 10 innovators in the year 2014. Snap's founder, Evan Spiegel, briefly worked as an intern on the txtWeb team.

Maheshwari was then hired by Flipkart to set up and grow Seller Ecosystem for Flipkart's marketplace. Under his leadership, Flipkart's seller base grew tenfold. He started initiatives such as ‘Flipkart Seller Campus’ and ‘Flipkart Helping Hands’ to empower and prepare small sellers during the peak festive demand season. He also pioneered global brand licensing for Indian sellers.

In April 2016, Maheshwari joined as the CEO of Network18 Digital to grow its online offerings which included Moneycontrol.com, Firstpost.com, News18.com, CricketNext.com, CNBC-TV18.com, Yatra.com, Homeshop18.com and BookMyShow.com. He pushed the group beyond web to encompass a gamut of digital services enabled by mobile, machine learning, programmatic ad buying, Augmented reality (AR), and Virtual reality (VR). The group became the most visited and viewed media network on YouTube as per Vidooly's News Network Report for September to November 2017. Moneycontrol also launched India's first smartwatch application to have voice search for stocks enabled on the Apple watch. Maheshwari is credited with the regional expansion of the group through growth in 13 Indian languages resulting in a three-digit increase in traffic across platforms with corresponding growth in revenues. He pioneered a subscription model for Moneycontrol wherein subscribers paid a small premium for business research and stock reports. In two years after his joining, the company crossed the threshold of 100 million unique digital visitors per month with well-diversified revenues encompassing advertising, subscription, branded content, and syndications.

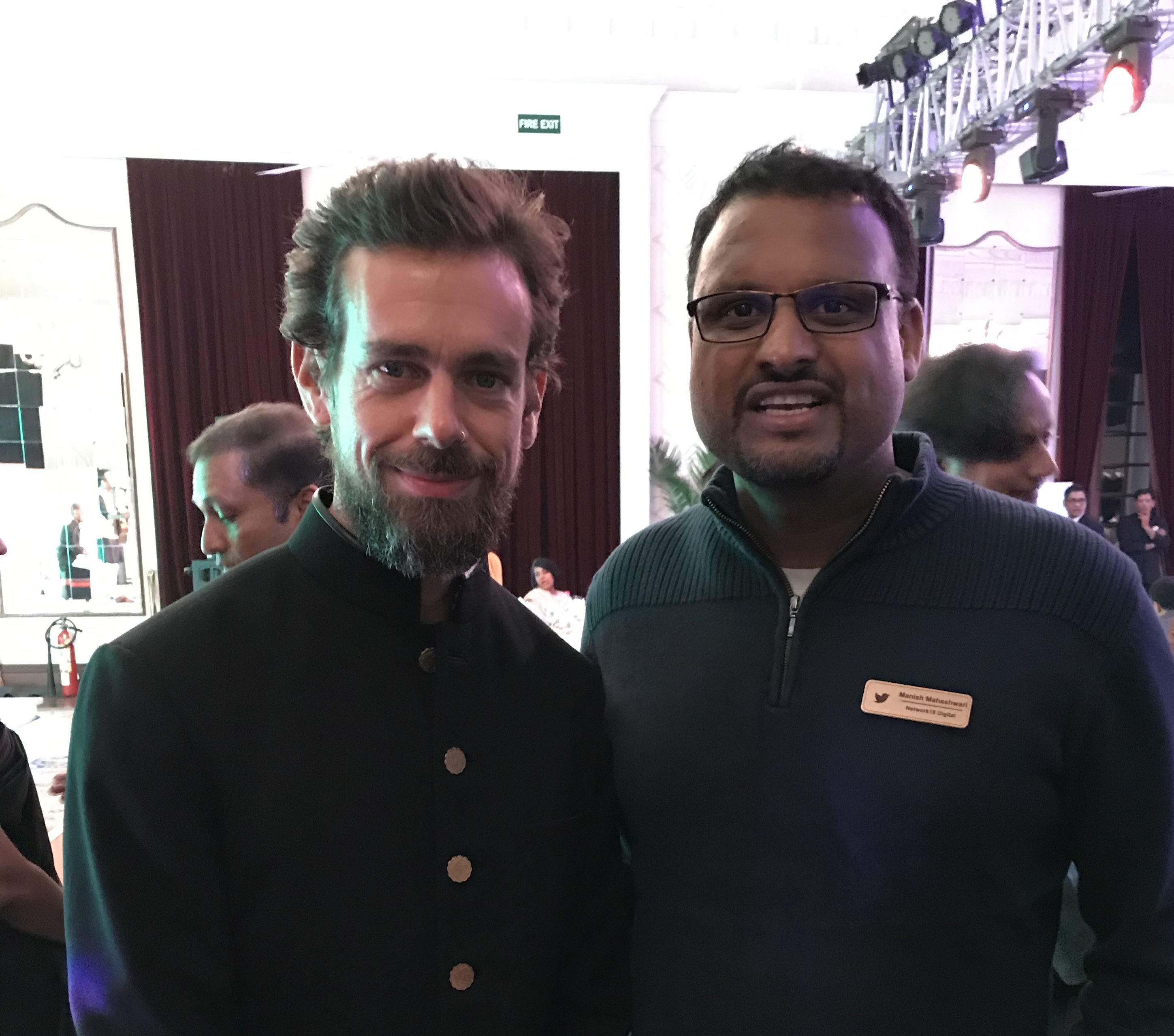
Twitter founder, Jack Dorsey (left) with Maheshwari (right) in 2018

In April 2019, Maheshwari joined as the head of Twitter's India business to oversee Twitter India's teams in Delhi, Mumbai, and Bengaluru. When the coronavirus pandemic ravaged India, Twitter became the virtual helpline to organise and manage relief operations across the country. He pushed for localizing the product for India and adding a preferred Indian language option on the platform, which helped algorithms surface content in that language to the user. Non-English tweets in India grew to 50% of overall tweets. India became one of the fastest-growing audience markets for Twitter globally and saw its fastest revenue growth in India in five years.

In December 2021, Maheshwari left Twitter to co-found Invact Metaversity, an edtech startup with the aim of building a metaverse-based education platform. The startup raised $5 million at a valuation of $33.5 million from investors including Arkam Ventures, Antler India, and Picus Capital. In May 2022, Maheshwari departed from Invact following disagreements over the company's vision and direction.

In early 2023, Maheshwari came out of stealth mode with an AI-enabled copilot for creators, called Fanory.ai. It enabled creators to generate incremental revenue in addition to what they can continue to earn via brand endorsements and advertising. Fanory.ai received a majority investment from JetSynthesys and was backed by the family offices of cricketing legend, Sachin Tendulkar, Serum Institute of India's Adar Poonawalla and Infosys Co-founder, Kris Gopalakrishnan. Fanory.ai was acquired by JetSynthesys.

In 2024, Harvard University selected Maheshwari for Mason Fellowship to research AI’s role in empowering individuals and improving the financial security of marginalized creators. In 2026, Maheshwari joined Stripe.

== Views on the Metaverse ==
In May 2022, Maheshwari publicly acknowledged through a series of tweets that the Metaverse education platform has failed to deliver a significantly differentiated learning experience for students. He admitted that the vision to use the Metaverse to make education accessible and interactive for students was not getting delivered at a level it was envisaged. This received widespread media coverage in India given Maheshwari’s stature.

Maheshwari's decision to cancel the Metaverse-based course citing technology and ecosystem challenges while solving accessibility on devices currently used by students proved to be prescient. Metaverse failed to take off globally because of issues related to technical feasibility and poor user adoption. VR headsets were expensive, limiting adoption. The Quest Pro, for example, launched at $1,500, making it inaccessible to average student. A truly immersive Metaverse required high-speed internet, powerful computing, and better user interfaces—all of which were still evolving. Meta, the biggest proponent of Metaverse, also quietly deprioritized the Metaverse as Horizon Worlds, Meta's flagship metaverse platform, reportedly had fewer than 200,000 monthly active users in late 2022, a small fraction of Meta's total user base.

== Contributions to AI ==
As a fellow at Harvard, Maheshwari concentrated on artificial intelligence (AI) and its potential to solve large-scale societal issues. He co-led the development of MEGHA, a voice-first AI assistant built to help rural Indian citizens access government welfare schemes through basic mobile phones. The innovation clinched the top prize at the Harvard Kennedy School’s AI-for-Good Hackathon in 2025, signaling the model’s real-world applicability and relevance in digitally underserved regions.

Beyond technical innovation, Maheshwari has contributed to the academic discourse on ethical AI and human-centered design. In his essay From Twitter to Harvard: Rethinking Leadership in the Age of AI, published by the Harvard Kennedy School, he examined the evolving role of leadership in algorithmically mediated societies. He advocates for a shift from traditional command-and-control models toward “sense-and-respond” approaches that emphasize authenticity, empathy, and the capacity to ask contextually relevant questions. At a public forum with former Google CEO Eric Schmidt, he emphasized the need for strong governance to ensure AI serves human well-being. His work highlights the importance of embedding normative values into AI governance frameworks.

== Awards and recognition ==
- Principal Madan Mohan Medal at Shri Ram College of Commerce
- Shils-Zeidman Award, the highest award for Entrepreneurship at the Wharton School
- Mason Fellow, Harvard Kennedy School, Harvard University
- First Prize, AI for Good Hackathon, Harvard Kennedy School, Harvard University
