= Bitmoji =

Personalized virtual emoji avatar

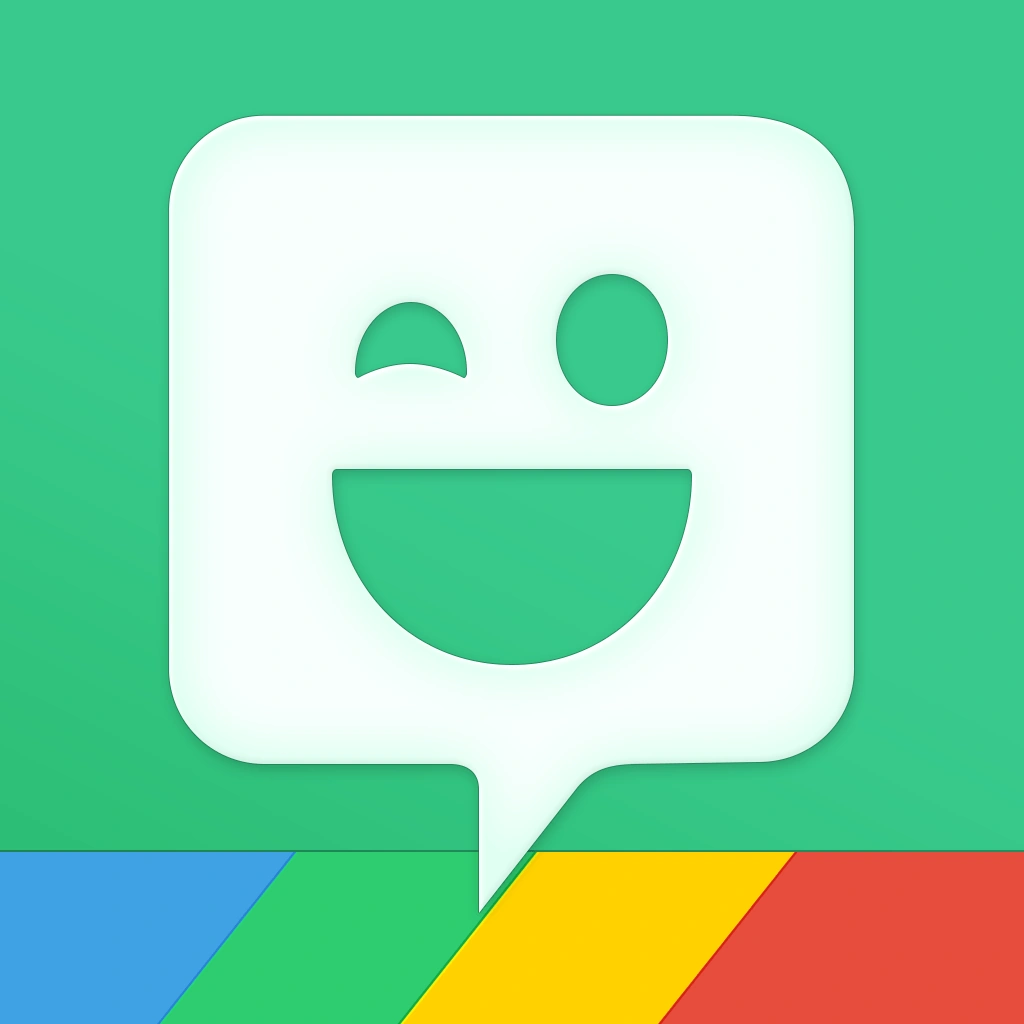
- Original author: Bitstrips
- Developer: Snap Inc.
- Release: 28 October 2014; 11 years ago
- Stable release: 11.80 / 10 November 2025; 10 months ago
- Operating system: iOS, Android
- Size: 83.7 MB
- Website: www.bitmoji.com

A lineup of Bitmoji characters in their pre-2023 2D look

Bitmoji is a cartoon-style digital avatar and personalized emoji from Snap Inc. The feature is offered through its own mobile app and via integration within the company's Snapchat messenger. Bitmoji dates back to the 2007 launch of Bitstrips, which ran a website for creating comic strips using personalized avatars. The standalone Bitmoji app was retired on June 30, 2026, with the features integrated from the app into Snapchat.

== Features ==
The Bitmoji virtual outfits wardrobe includes a large number of different clothes that regularly get refreshed and expanded and includes local and cultural clothes from around the world. Snap often teams up with fashion brands and designers (like Prada and Ralph Lauren) or sports associations (like the NBA) to create and include official clothes and accessories available for use in Bitmoji.

Bitmoji Stories is a feature showing comic strips featuring a user and their friends in Snapchat. It originally launched in November 2018.

Bitmoji stickers were integrated within the Gboard virtual keyboard. Bitmoji stickers were removed from Gboard on December 15th, 2025. In September 2022, it was announced that Bitmojis will also become watch faces in Wear OS.

In January 2020, Snap launched Bitmoji TV, which are 4-minute cartoons featuring a user's avatars.

Bitmoji Lens Games was launched in June 2025.

== History ==
The avatar was created with the Bitstrips website, which was launched in 2007 by the Toronto-based company Bitstrips Inc. In October 2014, Bitstrips launched the Bitmoji app as a spin-off for users to create stickers featuring Bitstrips characters in various templates. Snap Inc. purchased the Canadian company in July 2016 and has since further integrated Bitmoji into Snapchat.

Snap redesigned the Bitmoji avatars with a new 3D style that rolled out in October 2023, replacing the previous 2D style that had been prominent. There was some user dissatisfaction after the change.

In October 2025, Snap announced that it plans to launch a Bitmoji Plaza metaverse.

== Reception ==
Bitmoji has received a mainly positive reception. Fast Company described Bitmoji as nailing "the concept of making adorable, eerily accurate cartoon avatars to text to your friends." Forbes wrote, "2016 is the year of the Bitmoji. People are using these adorable avatars to communicate everywhere—in the office, in the dating world, and in texts with their parents and grandparents. People discuss and highlight their Bitmojis on Twitter, on television sitcoms, on Instagram, and on morning talk shows."

Bitmoji became the most downloaded iOS app worldwide in the year 2017. In 2018 it dropped to sixth in the list.

As of 2022, Bitmoji is used by over 250 million people, with more than 1 billion avatars having been created, according to its owner, Snap Inc.

== See also ==
- Bitstrips
- Galaxy Avatar
- Memoji
- Mii
- Xbox Avatar
