= Capylulu =

Chinese cartoon capybara character

- Introduced: March 2024
- Copyright holder: Tieguan (Beijing) Culture Media Co., Ltd.
- Country of origin: China

In-universe information
- Species: Capybara

Capylulu (Chinese: 水豚噜噜) is a Chinese cartoon character based on a capybara. Originally a supporting character in the animated series Pingtou Ge, it went viral due to its round, chubby, and adorable appearance. It was introduced in March 2024. The character appears in online stickers, merchandise, video game crossovers, and themed exhibitions.

== Design and characterization ==
Lulu is depicted as a yellow capybara with an orange on its head. In its fictional setting, it has a calm disposition, enjoys bathing and holidays, and wants to eat ice cream.

== Appearances ==
In April 2025, the mobile game Xipu Dalu (西普大陆) added Capylulu as part of a crossover featuring Pingtou Ge (平头哥). Players could obtain the character through a login event and use it for automated fishing. In November, the gaming voice-chat platform KOOK released Capylulu-themed avatar frames and meme cards during its sixth-anniversary celebrations.

The character's image also appeared in physical merchandise and handicrafts. In 2025, dough sculptor Wang Jingyang in Wuhu, Anhui, made figures of Capylulu and other cartoon characters from pictures supplied by customers. In December, Deli's flagship store at Jing'an Joy City in Shanghai sold Capylulu-themed merchandise.

In May 2026, the online game Xin Qiannü Youhun (新倩女幽魂) introduced a Capylulu crossover with themed quests, furniture, and a mount.

In July 2026, Capylulu images appeared alongside other online memes on the outdoor screen of the Donghu Zhiyan (东湖之眼) Ferris wheel in Wuhan. That summer, the Xixi InCity shopping mall in Hangzhou hosted the character's first exhibition in China. It included a pop-up shop, a large character figure, a photo booth, and a watermelon-eating competition.

In 2026, Capylulu received an award in the emerging animation IP category at the ninth Jade Monkey Awards. It was also shortlisted in the emerging IP category at the 2026 China Licensing Awards.
