= Bitstrips =

Defunct Canadian media and technology company

- Founded: 2007; 19 years ago
- Founder: Jacob Blackstock; David Kennedy; Shahan Panth; Dorian Baldwin; Jesse Brown
- Defunct: July 8, 2016 (10 years ago)
- Fate: Acquired by Snapchat Inc.
- Headquarters: Toronto, Canada

Bitstrips, Inc. was a Canadian media and technology company based in Toronto, founded in 2007 by Jacob Blackstock, David Kennedy, Shahan Panth, Dorian Baldwin, and Jesse Brown. The company created and offered a web application, Bitstrips.com, which allowed users to create comic strips using personalized avatars, and preset templates and poses.

Brown and Blackstock explained that the service was meant to enable self-expression without the need to have artistic skills. Bitstrips was first presented in 2008 at South by Southwest in Austin, Texas, and the service later piloted and launched a version designed for use as educational software. The service achieved increasing prominence following the launch of versions for Facebook and mobile platforms. In 2014, Bitstrips launched a spin-off app known as Bitmoji, which allows users to create personalized stickers for use in instant messaging.

In July 2016, Snapchat Inc. announced that it had acquired the company; the Bitstrips comic service was shut down, but Bitmoji remains operational, and has subsequently been given greater prominence within Snapchat's overall platform.

== History ==
Bitstrips was co-developed by Toronto-based comic artist Jacob Blackstock and his high school friend, journalist Jesse Brown. The service was originally envisioned as a means to allow anyone to create their own comic strip without needing artistic skills. Brown explained that "it's so difficult and time-consuming to tell a story in comic book form, drawing the same characters again and again in these tiny little panels, and just the amount of craftsmanship required. And even if you can do it well, which I never could, it takes years to make a story." Brown stated that the service would be "groundwork for a whole new way to communicate", and went as far as describing the service as being a "YouTube for comics". Blackstock explained that the concept of Bitstrips was influenced by his own use of comics as a form of socialization; a student, Blackstock and his friends drew comics featuring each other and shared them during classes. He felt that Bitstrips was a "medium for self-expression", stating that "It's not just about you making the comics, but since you and your friends star in these comics, it's like you're the medium. The visual nature of comics just speaks so much louder than text."

The service was publicly unveiled at South by Southwest in 2008. In 2009, the service introduced a version oriented towards the educational market, Bitstrips for Schools, which was initially piloted at a number of schools in Ontario. The service was praised by educators for being engaging to students, especially within language classes. Brown noted that students were using the service to create comics outside of class as well, stating that it was "so gratifying and shocking what people do with your tool to make their own stories in ways that you never would have anticipated. Some of them are just brilliant."

In December 2012, Bitstrips launched a version for Facebook; by July 2013, Bitstrips had 10 million unique users on Facebook, having created over 50 million comics. In October 2013, Bitstrips launched a mobile app; in two months, Bitstrips became a top-downloaded app in 40 countries, and over 30 million avatars had been created with it. In November 2013, Bitstrips secured a round of funding from Horizons Ventures and Li Ka-shing.

In October 2014, Bitstrips launched Bitmoji, a spin-off app that allows users to create stickers featuring Bitstrips characters in various templates.

In July 2016, following unconfirmed reports earlier in the year, Snapchat Inc. announced that it had acquired Bitstrips. The company's staff continue to operate out of Toronto, but the original Bitstrips comic service was shut down in favour of focusing exclusively on Bitmoji, leaving many Bitstrips users to call for a reboot of the comic service.
