= Stickers as a service =

Category of software services

Stickers as a service (SaaS) is a category of cloud computing services that provides digital stickers to messaging apps and photo editing software.

In this model, the stickers are sold through stores integrated in messaging apps, chat and photo editing software. They can be used as a method to generate revenue besides through in-app advertising as they are non-intrusive.

SaaS offerings may include handling micropayments, sticker shop integration and content management systems with developing apps, and is similar to Software as a Service (SaaS) and Platform as a Service (PaaS).

Stickers as a service enables developers to build a full sticker stores into their apps with just a few lines of code.

== Stickers ==
Digital stickers, commonly sold as virtual goods, tend to depict either original or well-known characters. They are used during chat sessions between users and act as large sized emoji to express emotions or as decoration in photographs.

Stickers vary from original characters to popular manga, anime and gaming characters or movie tie-ins. They can be purchased or downloaded for free in apps with sticker stores installed. Limited edition stickers may also be gained via special occasions or achievements.

It is used as an alternative to emoji or emoticons as they are a more expressive form of communication and have a variety of designs and art styles.

== Apps that use Stickers ==
- LINE
- Kakaotalk
- Facebook Messenger
- WhatsApp
- Instagram (Messages and Stories)
- Snapchat (Messages and Stories)
- Viber
- BlackBerry
- PhotoStamped

== Sticker Providers ==
- Giphy
- Tenor

== See also ==
- Virtual economy
- Gamification
- Purikura
