= Snap Inc. =

American technology company

- Logo since 2016
- Formerly: Snapchat Inc. (2011–2016)
- Type: Public
- Traded as: NYSE: SNAP (Class A)
- Industry: Consumer electronics; Augmented reality
- Founded: September 2011; 15 years ago (as Snapchat Inc.)
- Founders: Evan Spiegel; Bobby Murphy; Reggie Brown
- Headquarters: Santa Monica, California, U.S.
- Area served: Worldwide
- Key people: Michael Lynton (chairman); Evan Spiegel (CEO); Bobby Murphy (CTO)
- Products: Bitmoji; Snapchat; Spectacles (SPECS); Looksery
- Revenue: ▲US$5.93 billion (2025)
- Operating income: ▲US$−532 million (2025)
- Net income: ▲US$−460 million (2025)
- Total assets: ▼US$7.68 billion (2025)
- Total equity: ▼US$2.28 billion (2025)
- Owner: Evan Spiegel & Bobby Murphy (95.8% voting power combined); Fidelity Investments (14.6%)
- Number of employees: 5,261 (2025)
- Subsidiaries: Snap Limited; Specs Inc.
- Website: snap.com; web.snapchat.com

Snap Inc. is an American technology company, founded in September 2011, by Evan Spiegel, Bobby Murphy, and Reggie Brown, based in Santa Monica, California. The company developed and maintains technological products and services, namely Snapchat, Spectacles (SPECS), and Bitmoji. The company was named Snapchat Inc. at its inception, but it was rebranded Snap Inc. on September 24, 2016, to include the Spectacles (SPECS) product under the company name.

== History ==
The company was founded in September 2011, by Evan Spiegel, Reggie Brown and Bobby Murphy upon the relaunch of the photo sharing app Picaboo as Snapchat. On December 31, 2013, the application was hacked and 4.6 million usernames and phone numbers were leaked to the Internet.

By January 2014, the company had refused offers of acquisition, including overtures from Mark Zuckerberg, with Spiegel commenting that "trading that for some short-term gain isn't very interesting."

In May 2014, the company acquired the software company AddLive to provide needed technology to create a new video chat feature. In that same month, it settled U.S. Federal Trade Commission (FTC) charges over its having misled users regarding its collection of their address book data and transmission of their locations (without notice or consent), and regarding its claim that user messages disappeared after their expiration (rather than remaining accessible, as they had). In December, the company acquired Vergence Labs for $15 million in cash and stock, who were the developers of Epiphany Eyewear, and the mobile app Scan for $50 million, which was revealed during the 2014 Sony Pictures hack.

In May 2015, the company moved from its original headquarters to a 47,000 ft^{2} (4,366 m^{2}) office complex near Venice Beach and signed a 10-year lease. They were one of the first prominent online platforms to establish themselves there, alongside others such as Whisper and Tinder, giving Venice the new title of "Silicon Beach." In February 2017, two weeks before the company's IPO, The New York Times published a feature about Snap's role in turning the area into a technology hub, noting that Snap, with a total of 1,900 employees, had "already changed the face of Venice."

In September 2015, Snapchat acquired Looksery to develop Lenses for its mobile app, a feature based on Looksery's facial recognition software. In March, July, and August 2016, the company acquired Bitstrips for $100 million, Obvious Engineering, the developers of Seene, for an undisclosed amount and Vurb for $100 million. Vurb formerly developed the eponymous mobile search engine. The Vurb card-based engine removed the need to switch through multiple other applications on the device to perform a task.

In September 2016, the company officially named itself Snap Inc., and unveiled smartglasses known as Spectacles. In November 2016, the company filed documents for an initial public offering (IPO) with an estimated market value of $25–35 billion. In December 2016, the company opened research and development in Shenzhen and acquired advertising and technology company Flite and Israel-based augmented reality startup Cimagine Media for $30–40 million. A partnership issued in December 2016 with Time Warner's Turner Broadcasting System will allow integration of Turner properties on Snapchat, while cooperating with Snap Inc. to develop original content.

In January 2017, the company announced that it had established an international headquarters in Soho, London. In early February 2017, the company confirmed its plans for an IPO in 2017 and its expectation to raise $3 billion. In early March 2017, the company went public under the trading symbol SNAP, and raised almost $30 billion in market capitalization on the first day of trading.

In late May 2017, the company acquired the location sharing app Zenly in a cash and stock deal. The Zenly app will remain functional, but its concepts were incorporated into a Snapchat feature added in June 2017. In August 2017, Business Insider reported that Google discussed an offer to buy the company for $30 billion in early 2016. In October 2017, the company announced that it had formed a joint venture with NBCUniversal to produce content for Snap's platforms, and that it had signed Duplass Brothers Productions as its first partner. In November 2017, Tencent acquired a 12% non-voting minority equity stake of the company in the open market. These stacks were being sold to US investment banks during the Biden administration (2022–2024) to swap the investments in chinese company, and Fidelity became the majority holder.

On October 26, 2018, at TwitchCon, Snap launched a new desktop application for macOS and Windows known as Snap Camera. It allows users to utilize Snapchat filters via PC webcams in video chat and live streaming services such as Skype, Twitch, YouTube, and Zoom. Snap also announced additional integration with Twitch.

In August 2022, The Verge reported that Snap would be laying off 20% of its 6,400-person workforce. The layoffs primarily impacted the company's hardware division and the developer products including the separately run Zenly.

On 5 February 2024, Snap Inc. announced it would lay off 10% of its global workforce, approximately 500 employees, partly to "promote in-person collaboration", marking another significant reduction following a 20% staff cut in 2022. On September 12, 2024, Snap appointed Yahoo CEO Jim Lanzone to its board of directors.

== Products ==
=== Software ===
The company develops and maintains the image messaging and multimedia mobile app Snapchat, as well as the Snapchat's Augmented Reality (AR) ad lens. The function was launched in September 2015. Specifically, the AR ad lens is one of the unique features of Snapchat, which allows advertisers to attract their target audience with various innovative lenses. Users can also use these lenses to change their faces, appearance, and even surroundings based on their preferences, and share those visual images or videos within their social networks.

Snap also runs Bitmoji which allows users to create custom stickers featuring a personal avatar. Bitmoji was originally launched by Bitstrips in 2014.

=== Hardware ===
In addition, the company also develops and manufactures the wearable camera called Spectacles, a pair of smartglasses that connect to the user's Snapchat account and records videos in a circular video format adjustable in any orientation.

On February 20, 2017, Snap Spectacles became available for purchase online. The company sold only 220,000 pairs of Snap Spectacles V1. The company later confirmed losses in excess of $40 million due to excess inventory. The company developed and launched Spectacles V2 first in April 2018. On April 28, 2022, the company announced a mini drone called Pixy. Later that year in August, it was reported that future development of Pixy would be discontinued, while continuing to sell the current iteration of the drone.

In June 2026, Snap announced a new generation of augmented reality glasses branded Specs.

== Funding and shares ==
Snapchat app raised $485,000 in its seed round and an undisclosed amount of bridge funding from Lightspeed Venture Partners. By February 2013, Snapchat confirmed a $13.5 million Series A funding round led by Benchmark, which valued the company at between $60 million and $70 million. In June 2013, Snapchat raised $60 million in a Series B funding round led by venture capital firm Institutional Venture Partners. The firm also appointed a new high-profile board member, Michael Lynton of Sony's American division. By mid-July 2013, a media report valued the company at $860 million.

On November 14, 2013, The Wall Street Journal reported that Facebook offered to acquire Snapchat for $3 billion, but Spiegel declined the cash offer. Tech writer Om Malik then claimed on November 15, 2013, that Google had offered $4 billion, but Spiegel again declined. On December 11, 2013, Snapchat confirmed $50 million in Series C funding from Coatue Management.

Beyond 2014, the company had achieved a $10–$20 billion valuation, depending on the source, raising $100 million in Series D funding led by KPCB and $485 million in a Series E round led by Alibaba Group. Investors included General Catalyst, Kingdom Holding Company, SV Angel, Yahoo!, NBCUniversal, and Tencent. According to reports in May 2016, the company's estimated worth was said to be approaching $22.7 billion in the event of a new Series F round of investment of $1.8 billion from Spark Capital, General Atlantic, Sequoia Capital, T. Rowe Price, Meritech Capital Partners, Dragoneer Investment Group and others, led by Fidelity Investments. Later, the company got an additional $200 million in the following Series FP round. Further reports in 2016 suggested that funding was almost at $3 billion and that Snapchat was targeting yearly revenues of a billion dollars. Google reportedly offered Snap $30 billion in 2016 for acquisition, which Snap turned down.

=== 2017 initial public offering ===
In January 2017, The Wall Street Journal reported that "people familiar with the matter" stated that Snap Inc. would share 2.5% of the money raised in an upcoming initial public offering (IPO) with the banks managing the IPO. It also reported that after the predicted March 2017 IPO, the two Snap co-founders would hold over "70% of the voting power" in the company and own around 45% of the total stock. On January 29, 2017, it was reported that the Snap Inc. IPO would likely take place on the New York Stock Exchange. As both the NYSE and Nasdaq had been "aggressively courting the listing for more than a year," the Wall Street Journal called it "a big competitive victory for the Big Board." Snap's IPO was estimated to value the company at between $20 billion and $25 billion, the largest IPO on a US exchange since Alibaba debuted in 2014 at a value of $168 billion. Beyond the two founders, the two biggest shareholders for the planned early 2017 Snap IPO were Benchmark and Lightspeed Venture Partners, both prior investors and venture-capital firms from Silicon Valley. They held a combined stake of about 20%. On March 1, 2017, it was reported that Snap Inc. "values itself at nearly $24B with its IPO pricing." Snap Inc.'s stock started trading on March 2, 2017, under the symbol SNAP, on the New York Stock Exchange.

When Snap reported earnings for the first time in May 2017, it reported a $2.2 billion quarterly loss, and the stock fell more than 20%, erasing most of the gains since the IPO. Its market capitalization reached $100 billion for the first time on 22 February 2021.

In February 2024, stock fell 30% after earnings with disappointing profit guidance. Market capitalisation as of 3 March 2024 was $18B, below 2017 IPO level.

== Controversies ==
=== Reggie Brown lawsuit ===
In February 2013, Reggie Brown sued Evan Spiegel and Bobby Murphy. Early investors were also eventually named in the lawsuit. Brown said that he had once been the chief marketing officer for the initial selfie app used to launch Snapchat, offering evidence of contacts with publications such as Cosmopolitan. He also claimed that he had come up with the original concept, which he had ultimately called Picaboo, and that he had created the mascot logo for the product while working with Spiegel to promote and market the idea. Originally titled "Toyopa Group, LLC," Brown said that he had named the newly formed company as well. Brown's lawyers offered documentation of a collaboration with Spiegel and Murphy, which included the filing of an original patent by the three Stanford classmates, but Snapchat described the lawsuit as meritless and called Brown's tactics a "shakedown". During April's depositions, Brown testified that he had believed he was an equal partner, and that he had agreed to share costs and profits. Spiegel instead described Brown as an unpaid intern who had been given an opportunity to earn valuable experience, and although Murphy claimed that he had not fully understood what Brown's role was supposed to have been, he too characterized Brown's involvement as having been that of an internship. Months later, Spiegel dismissed the lawsuit as an example of opportunists who seek out rapidly successful companies in an attempt "to also profit from the hard work of others."

On 9 September 2014, the company announced that it had settled the lawsuit for an initially undisclosed amount. The settlement amount was revealed on 2 February 2017, in Snap's SEC public filing to be $157.5 million. As part of the settlement, it credited Brown with the conceptual idea for Snapchat.

The press release published by Snapchat's communication department quoted Spiegel:

"We are pleased that we have been able to resolve this matter in a manner that is satisfactory to Mr. Brown and the Company. We acknowledge Reggie's contribution to the creation of Snapchat and appreciate his work in getting the application off the ground."

=== FTC settlement ===
The Federal Trade Commission alleged that the company had exaggerated to the public the degree to which mobile app images and photos could actually be made to disappear. Following a settlement in 2014, Snapchat was not fined, but the app service agreed to have its claims and policies monitored by an independent party for a period of 20 years.

=== 2018 redesign ===
The redesign of the Snapchat app in early-2018 made changes that were initially unpopular with users. Around 1.2 million people petitioned Snap, Inc. to roll back the redesign. The company's official response made no concessions, other than noting, "We completely understand the new Snapchat has felt uncomfortable for many."

Due to the redesign and other market factors in 2018, such as the growth of Instagram Stories and WhatsApp Status, Daily Active Users (DAU) of the app only rose 2% from Q4 2017. Snap, Inc. stock fell more than 15% in after-hours trading following the earnings report release. Growth of daily active users slowed in Q1 2018, and the growth rate for Q2 2018 was "planned to decelerate rapidly from Q1 levels." Snap, Inc. has commented on the redesign, saying, "We have also started to realise some of the positive benefits [of the redesign], including increased new user retention for older users." Some publishers commented that the turn towards the older demographic could spell the start of a decline for the app.

=== Data storage ===
In a December 2020 announcement, the Google Cloud Platform confirmed the development of the memorandum of understanding (MoU) it signed with Saudi Aramco. The update stated the possibility of exploring options to establish cloud services in Saudi, where it confirmed storing Snapchat data. The decision was contested by Access Now, a non-profit organization, and CIPPIC, a Canadian public interest technology law clinic. The firms objected to Google's decision of choosing Saudi Arabia as its new Google Cloud region overlooking an alarming record of human rights abuse and longstanding surveillance accusations. The firms claimed that placing the personal information of millions of Snapchat users there would put it under the jurisdiction of the government of Saudi Arabia, jeopardizing the security of the data.

=== California civil rights lawsuit ===
In June 2024, Snap paid $15 million to settle a lawsuit brought by the California Civil Rights Department alleging that the company discriminated against female employees with respect to pay and promotions, failed to prevent workplace sexual harassment, and retaliated against women who filed complaints.
