= Sobrr =

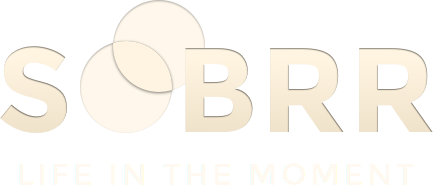
- Developer: Sobrr Inc.
- Release: July 2014
- Platform: iOS, Android
- Size: Android: ~27 megabytes iOS: ~61 megabytes
- Available in: 26 languages
- List of languages English, Catalan, Czech, Danish, Dutch, French, German, Greek, Hebrew, Indonesian, Italian, Japanese, Korean, Norwegian Bokmål, Norwegian Nynorsk, Polish, Portuguese, Russian, Simplified Chinese, Spanish, Swedish, Thai, Traditional Chinese, Turkish, Ukrainian, Vietnamese
- Type: Social media
- Website: imsobrr.com

Sobrr was a mobile application for iOS and Android. It was released in July 2014. It has been described by critics as an "anti-Facebook" social media.

== See also ==
- Snapchat
