= My Ex-BFF Court =

American television series

Snapchat’s My Ex-BFF Court is a 2018 spoof of daytime-TV court shows such as “Divorce Court.” Each episode features two former friends who bring a conflict to the court. Whoever is found guilty gets a humorous sentence.

== Background ==
Vertical Networks (Snapchat Publisher Story) used the actual set from the “Divorce Court” in the show. Vertical Networks was founded in 2016, it is currently located in Southern California and is operated by CEO Jesús Chavez.

== Format ==
Every episode is hosted by comedian Matteo Lane (born as Matthew Lane) in the role of judge.

== Cast ==
=== Main ===
- Matteo Lane as himself (Judge)

=== Guest stars ===
- George Todd McLachlan as himself
- Marco DelVecchio as himself
- Tyrone Emanuel as himself
- Anthony Rory Tran as himself
- Reante Brown as himself
- VitoAngelino Kaiewe as Vito
- Tyrone Evans Clark as himself
