= Bobby Murphy =

Filipino-American Internet entrepreneur and software engineer (born 1988)

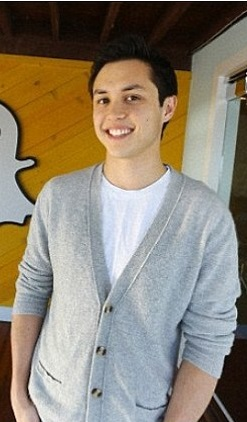
- Murphy in January 2013
- Born: July 19, 1988 (age 38); Berkeley, California, U.S.
- Education: Saint Mary's College High School
- Alma mater: Stanford University (BS)
- Years active: 2011-present
- Employer: Snap Inc.
- Known for: Co-founder of Snap Inc. (since 2016); Co-founder of Snapchat (since 2011)
- Title: CTO of Snap Inc.
- Spouse: Kelsey Bateman

Robert Cornelius Murphy (born July 19, 1988) is an American Internet entrepreneur and software engineer. He is the co-founder and the CTO of the American multinational technology company Snap Inc., which he created (as Snapchat Inc.) with Evan Spiegel and Reggie Brown while they were students at Stanford University.

He was named as one of the 100 most influential people in 2014 by Time. In 2015, Murphy was first listed and became the second-youngest billionaire in the world by Forbes.

== Early life ==
Murphy was born on July 19, 1988, in Berkeley, California. His father is an Irish-American and his mother is a first-generation Filipino American.

Murphy grew up in Berkeley and was educated at the School of the Madeleine, a private Roman Catholic grade school there. He received his secondary education at Saint Mary's College High School, also a private Catholic high school in Berkeley.

== Education ==
Murphy graduated in 2010 from Stanford University in Stanford, California, where he received a Bachelor of Science degree in mathematical and computational science. He was also a member of Kappa Sigma fraternity along with Evan Spiegel and Reggie Brown.

== Career ==
Murphy was recruited by Spiegel after they finished working on a failed startup called Future Freshman, a website that helped high school kids get advice when applying to colleges. In 2011, Murphy co-founded a disappearing-image messaging app called Picaboo. The name was later changed to Snapchat. After graduating from Stanford, Murphy spent a year working as a software engineer at Revel Systems (an iPad point of sale system for restaurants). Until Snapchat could secure venture capital funding, he used half of his paycheck to cover the cost of Snapchat's server bills.

At Snapchat, Murphy has led the engineering and research teams. Murphy has also worked with Snapchat's Snap Labs team, which produced Spectacles camera glasses in 2018. At the time of Snapchat's IPO in 2017, Murphy and Spiegel held over 45% of the company's total stock. They also held over 70% of the voting power.

In February 2017, Murphy and Spiegel pledged to donate up to 13,000,000 shares of Class A common stock to their newly created Snap Foundation, which will support the arts, education and youth non-profits, over the course of 15–20 years.

== Personal life ==
Murphy was recorded as the 1,250th-richest person in the world, by Forbes Magazine. In 2015, Murphy ranked as the #15 U.S. Richest Entrepreneurs Under 40. As of 2016, he was ranked #374 on the Forbes 400. In 2018, Murphy purchased the former Pacific Palisades estate of actor Eddie Albert for the asking price of $19.5 million. In 2021, he purchased a property on the Manhattan Beach Strand for $14.5 million.
