= Censorship of Snapchat =

Restriction of access to Snapchat by governments and organizations

Map of countries where Snapchat is banned as of 2024. Banned Previously banned No ban

Snapchat is a social media network that has been banned and/or otherwise restricted in various countries. Potential reasons for such bans include national security, user privacy, social control, protecting culture, reducing displays of behavior considered to be immoral, economic protectionism, protecting mental health (especially among youth), technological sovereignty, and regulatory compliance. Snapchat banned in Cuba by itself due to US sanctions.

== Banned ==
Countries that ban Snapchat
Country	Date
China	2010s or 2020s.
Cuba	2021 (By Snapchat)
Iran	2010s or 2020s.
North Korea	
Russia	2025
Turkmenistan	
South Sudan	13 September 2024

== Usage and scale ==
"Despite various international restrictions, Snap Inc. announced in March 2026 that users globally created nearly 2 trillion Snaps over the course of 2025."

== Previously banned ==
Snapchat, Tinder, and Telegram were banned until 2023 in Nepal.
