= Looksery =

American software and photography company

- Type: Subsidiary
- Industry: Software; Photography
- Founded: 2013; 13 years ago
- Founders: Victor Shaburov; Yurii Monastyrshin
- Headquarters: San Francisco, United States
- Key people: Victor Shaburov President; Yurii Monastyrshin COO; Alexander Grytsiuk CTO; Lidiya Bogdanovych Head of Design; Julie Krasnienko Marketing and Business Development Director
- Number of employees: 45 (2016)
- Parent: Snap Inc. (2015–present)
- Website: www.looksery.com

Looksery is an American software and photography company founded in 2013 by Victor Shaburov and Yurii Monastyrshin. The company is based in San Francisco and owned by Snap Inc. The company developed the Looksery application that does facial modification of photos in real time on mobile platforms.

The company has offices in the United States and Ukraine.

== History ==
Victor Shaburov founded Looksery company in 2013 in San Francisco. Shaburov was sponsoring a programming contest in Ukraine, which Yurii Monastyrshin won twice in succession. Victor offered him to become a co-founder of the startup. Julie Krasnienko, the company's marketing director, said that other prize-winners from the same contest – Fedor Polyakov, Sergey Sklyanichenko and Oleg Petrov – joined the founding team.

The idea arose during a video call between the two, when Shaburov suggested that video calling remained unpopular because people disliked their own appearance on camera; Monastyrshin, who had an internship at Facebook planned for that summer, took up the project instead. A prototype capable of altering a face in real time was built within three months, and the technology was ported to mobile devices during 2014, by which time Monastyrshin was leading a development team of about fifteen people.

In 2014, offices were established in Odesa, Ukraine and Sochi, Russia. Later, the company launched a Kickstarter campaign in order to raise funds, and exceeded their fundraising goal. The campaign had sought $30,000 and raised around $50,000. In April 2014 the company signed its first licensing contract, worth $800,000, with Sony.

Later in 2014 the startup took third place in the startup competition at IDCEE and used the €5,000 prize to buy supplies for orphans from the war-affected areas of eastern Ukraine. According to Forbes Ukraine, Skype approached the company with an offer at a point when the founders valued it at around $30 million, and they declined.

In September 2015, Looksery was acquired by Snap Inc. for $150 million, marking the biggest startup acquisition in Ukraine’s history. Snapchat used the Looksery technology to launch a new feature, Lenses.

Snap's registration statement for its 2017 initial public offering gave the purchase consideration as $79.4 million, with a further $71.2 million provided in retention payments – $43.6 million in restricted stock units and $27.6 million in cash paid to employees over the four years following the transaction – and $16.4 million in transaction-related costs. After the acquisition the Looksery team relocated to California to work alongside their new Snapchat colleagues; Krasnienko said the decision to move the team had been made by the buyer. Monastyrshin led the thirty former Looksery employees, who built the augmented reality platform that Snapchat launched in 2016 to let users create their own Lenses; by the time he left the company in 2022 the team had grown to about 200 developers.

== Application ==
Before Snapchat's acquisition, Looksery was available as a stand-alone application for iOS and Android. The application was released for iOS on October 24, 2014, as a free download, offering both corrective filters that removed blemishes, evened out skin tone or changed eye colour and animated avatars such as a panda, a zombie or a flaming skull.

Looksery’s mobile application enabled users to simulate their appearance for a photo or video chat in real-time. Additionally, users could share photos and videos through popular social networks and messengers. When Snapchat launched its product, Lenses, Looksery was withdrawn as a stand-alone product. By the time of the acquisition, the app had been downloaded around 10 million times across mobile platforms, and it subsequently disappeared from the app stores.

In June 2014 Looksery launched on crowdfunding site Kickstarter an app that makes you look better on video chat.

== Technology ==
The application overlaid a face with a vector mask that tracked individual facial features and then moved those features to produce the altered appearance. Krasnienko said that face tracking was first written for desktop computers, and that after the first months of optimisation it ran at 10–15 frames per second on smartphones; further work brought it to the 30 frames per second produced by the front camera of the iPhone 5, which the company adopted as its minimum supported device. By June 2014, Looksery had five patents pending relating to its video face-tracking code and its filters. The software also reduced the size of transmitted video by distinguishing the parts of a face that move from those that do not.

The consumer application served in part as a demonstration of technology that the company licensed to businesses, among them call centres, handset manufacturers, mobile carriers, cosmetics companies, brands and film studios. The technology behind Lenses was later the subject of a dispute over whether it constituted facial recognition. Snapchat maintained that Lenses detect faces in general without identifying particular individuals.

== Reception ==
Looksery garnered a lot of media attention. Vogue selected Looksery as one of the ten Best Apps of 2014 and wrote that "it’s truly addictive and instantly fills you with the childlike energy and creativity of playing make-believe". TechCrunch called it "a clever application that lets you change your facial features..." and Inc. wrote that "[it] is an example of technology that may make it easier for camera-shy folks to sit through live video calls or take pictures in the future."

== Awards ==
In 2014, Looksery won the Best Innovative Startup Award at the SVOD annual conference in Silicon Valley.
