= Instagram face =

Beauty standard based on digitally altered photographs

Instagram face is a beauty standard based on the filters and influencers popular on Instagram.

== Overview ==
An "Instagram face" has catlike eyes, long lashes, a small nose, high cheekbones, full lips, and a blank expression. Digital filters manipulate photographs and video to create an idealized image that, according to critics, has resulted in an unrealistic and homogeneous beauty standard. According to Jia Tolentino, the face is "distinctly white but ambiguously ethnic". Research has shown that Instagram filters that create the appearance of 'Instagram face' are largely Eurocentric in their production of lighter skin and small noses, whilst appropriating 'ethnic' features such as larger lips and upturned eyes.

In 2024, cosmetic surgeon Paul Banwell said, "People used to come to see me asking to look like a particular celebrity, but many patients come to me now wanting to look like the filtered version of themselves."

While based on digital filters, the look is achieved in person using heavy applications of makeup or cosmetic surgery. Plastic surgery, Botox injections, and injectable filler have significantly increased in popularity since the rise of digital filters. Influencers market makeup products designed to recreate the look.

== History ==
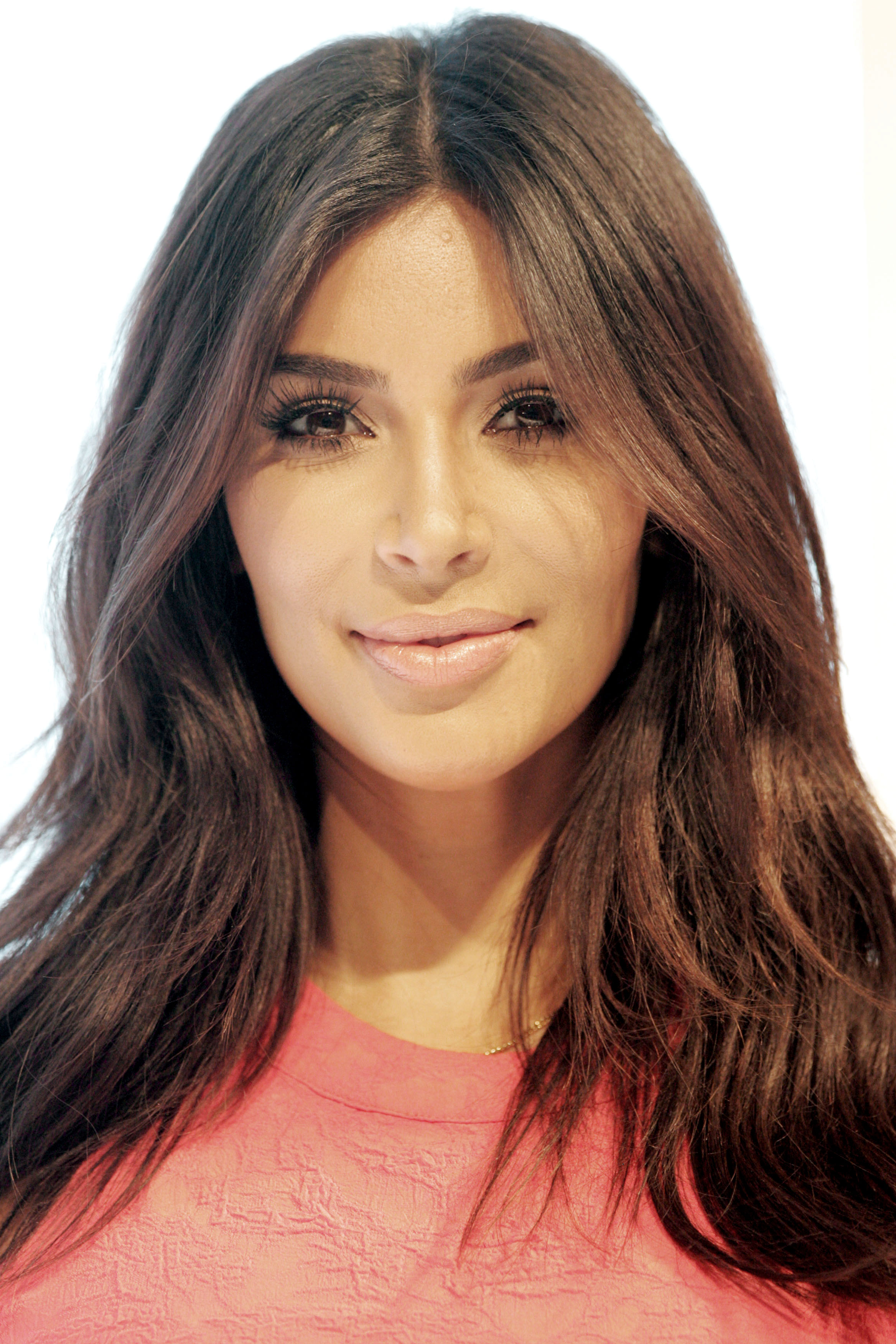
Kim Kardashian, dubbed "patient zero" of Instagram face.

The growth of reality television series and social media throughout the 2010s has influenced the popularity of Instagram face. In 2019, Jia Tolentino of The New Yorker referred to this phenomenon as "Instagram Face," identifying Kim Kardashian as its "patient zero." Similarly, her younger sister Kylie Jenner significantly impacted the trend with her 2015 lip filler confession, which acted as a catalyst, introducing Juvéderm to a new generation. Sirin Kale of Vice News has described Jenner as "at the vanguard of an aesthetic that’s swept through British towns and cities," while also pointing towards other celebrities such as Iggy Azalea and Farrah Abraham.

In 2018, Americans underwent 7 million neurotoxin injections and 2.5 million filler injections and spent $16.5 billion on cosmetic surgery. 92% of the latter was performed on women. Botox usage has also been on the rise.

== Criticism ==
In her 2021 book The Selfie, Temporality, and Contemporary Photography, Claire Raymond of Princeton University criticised "Instagram faces" for erasing "heritable quirks and lived history; it erases what makes the human face so compelling, whether conventionally beautiful or not," while also arguing that the procedures used to create Instagram faces "numb and freeze the face and skin, rendering less mobile the lips, the eyes, and the neck. Numbness is the central feature of the experience for the woman who gets Instagram face through cosmetic procedures. Others may see her more, but she feels less and less."

In September 2026, Meta Platforms, which owns Instagram, agreed to stop minors from using “extreme makeup filters,” although implementation is still unclear.

== Influence on popular culture ==
The increasing popularity of cosmetic surgeries towards a homogeneous ideal has resulted in the emergence of the "goopcore" sub-genre of body horror. The sub-genre combines graphic violence with body modifications from the beauty industry. Allie Rowbottom's goopcore novel Aesthetica centers around an influencer attempting to undo years of plastic surgery with a new experimental procedure.

== See also ==
- Body dysmorphic disorder
