= Evan Spiegel =

American businessman (born 1990)

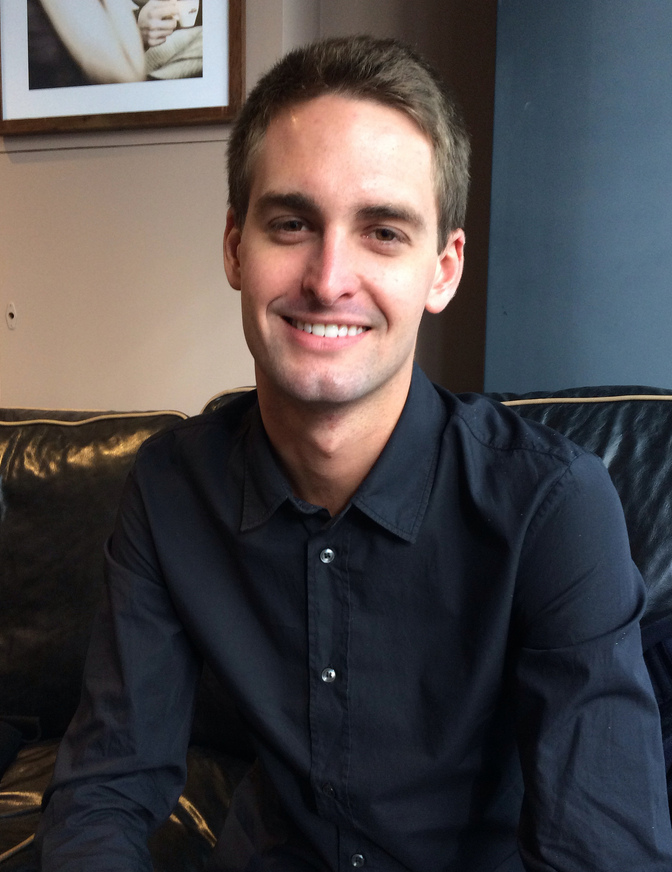
- Spiegel in 2013
- Born: Evan Thomas Spiegel; June 4, 1990 (age 36); Los Angeles, California, U.S.
- Citizenship: American; French
- Education: Stanford University (BS)
- Occupation: Entrepreneur
- Years active: 2011–present
- Employer: Snap Inc.
- Known for: Co-founder and CEO of Snap Inc.
- Title: CEO of Snap Inc.
- Spouse: Miranda Kerr (m. 2017)
- Children: 3

Evan Thomas Spiegel (born June 4, 1990) is an American businessman who is the co-founder and CEO of Snap Inc. Spiegel was the youngest billionaire in the world in 2015. As of August 2025, he had a personal net worth of $2.5 billion according to Forbes.

== Early life and education ==
Evan Thomas Spiegel was born in Los Angeles, California, to lawyers John W. Spiegel and Melissa Ann Thomas. He grew up in Pacific Palisades, California, where he was raised Episcopalian. He was educated at the Crossroads School for Arts and Sciences in Santa Monica, and attended Stanford University.

Spiegel took design classes at the Otis College of Art and Design while still in high school and at the Art Center College of Design in Pasadena the summer before entering Stanford. He also had an unpaid internship in sales at Red Bull. While a student, he worked as a paid intern for a biomedical company, as a careers instructor in Cape Town, South Africa, and at Intuit on the TxtWeb project. Spiegel is a member of Kappa Sigma fraternity.

== Career ==
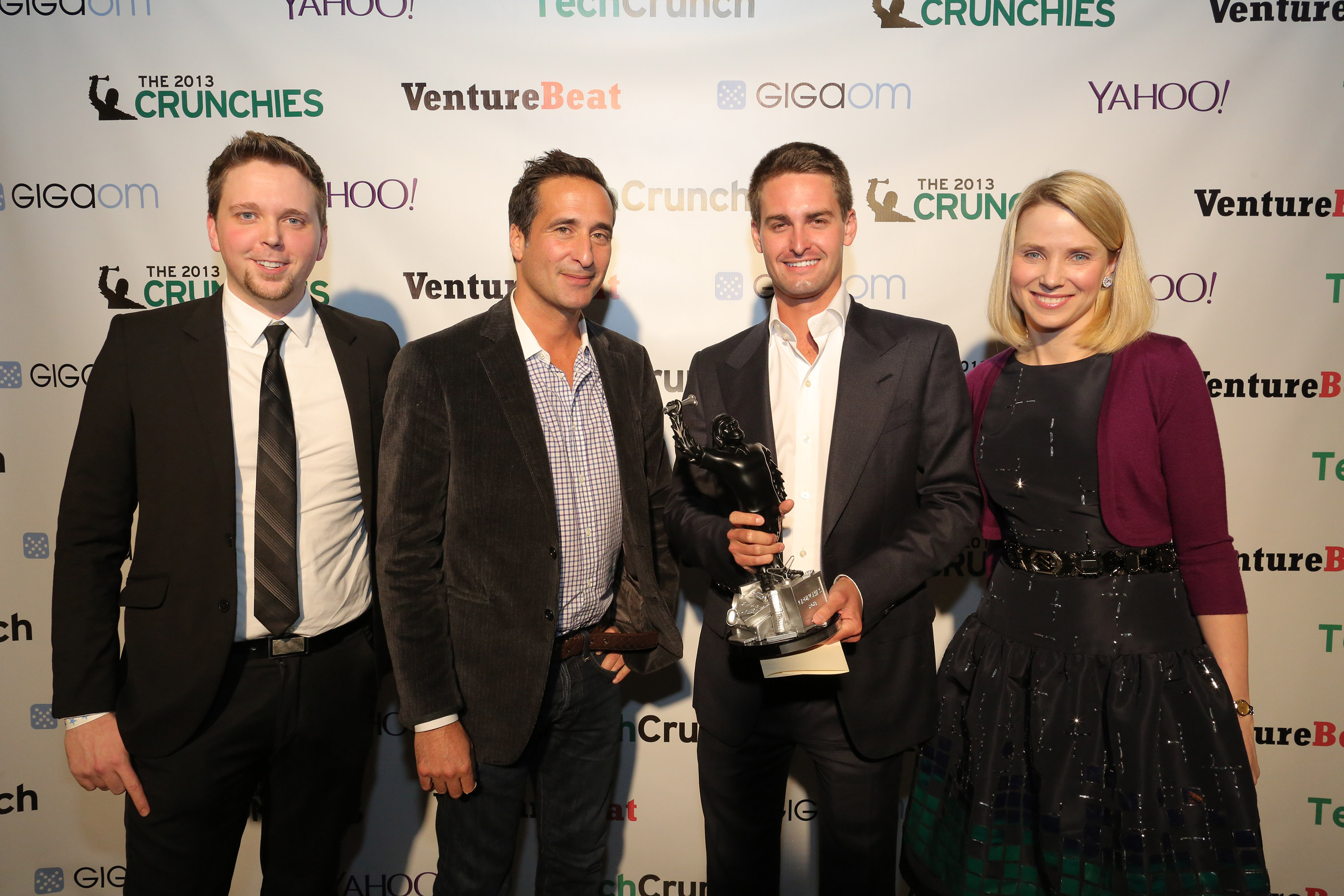
Spiegel holding a trophy at the 7th Annual Crunchies Awards on February 10, 2014, in San Francisco.

In April 2011, Spiegel proposed an app with ephemeral messaging as a product design class project. Later that year, Spiegel worked with fellow Stanford classmates Bobby Murphy and Reggie Brown to launch a prototype of this concept called "Picaboo", which they later renamed as Snapchat. The app's popularity grew significantly and in 2012, Spiegel left Stanford to focus on Snapchat shortly before completing his degree. By the end of 2012, Spiegel's Snapchat app had reached 1 million daily active users. He later completed his remaining credits and graduated in 2018. Time magazine named Spiegel as one of the 100 most influential people in the world in 2014 and 2017.

In February 2017, Spiegel and Murphy pledged to donate upwards of 13,000,000 shares of Class A common stock over the next 15–20 years to an arts, education and youth non-profit. They have created the Snap Foundation which is a non-profit organization. Their mission is to "develop pathways to the creative economy for underrepresented youths in Los Angeles." During the COVID-19 pandemic, they donated $3 million to people affected by the pandemic. In January 2017 The Wall Street Journal reported that after the predicted March 2017 initial public offering for Snap Inc., Murphy and Evan Spiegel would hold over "70% of the voting power" in the company, and own around 45% of the total stock.

Spiegel joined the board of directors of investment management company Kohlberg Kravis Roberts in 2021.

== Personal life ==
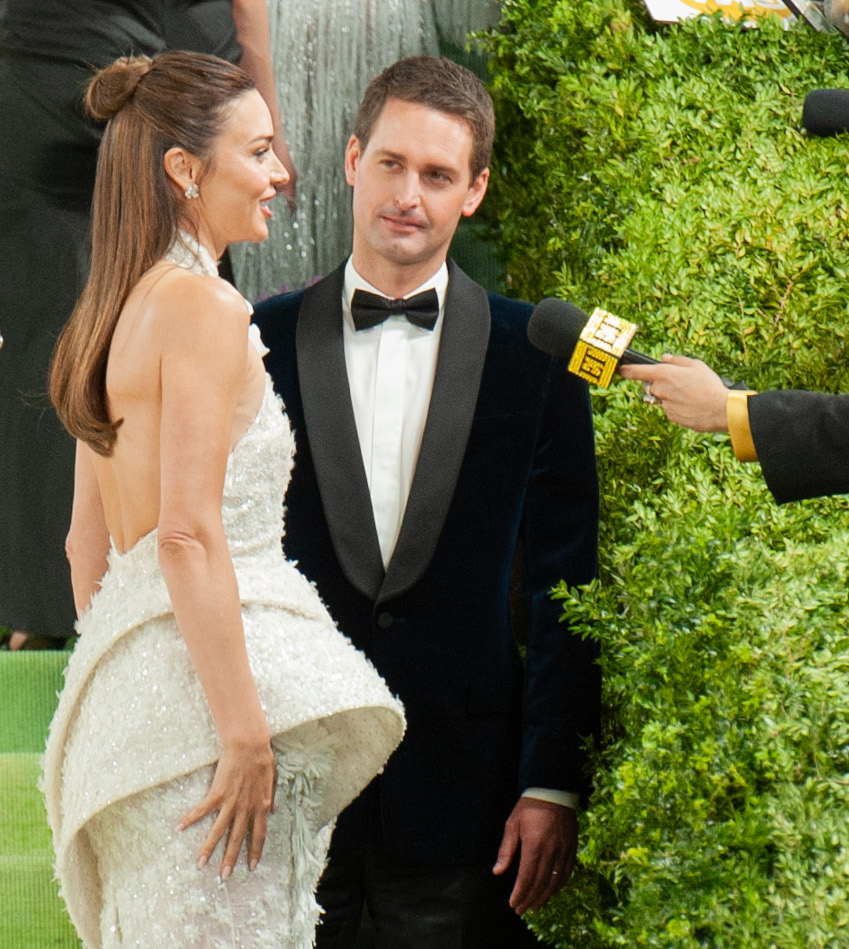
Spiegel (right) and his wife Miranda Kerr (left) at the 2026 Met Gala

Spiegel began dating Australian model Miranda Kerr in 2015. They became engaged on July 20, 2016. They married in a private ceremony in Los Angeles on May 27, 2017. Just a month before Spiegel's engagement to Kerr, he purchased a 7,164 square foot, $12 million house in the Brentwood neighborhood of West Los Angeles that was previously owned by Harrison Ford as well as Owen Reilly. Spiegel has three sons with Kerr and a stepson from Kerr's previous marriage to Orlando Bloom.

As of 2021, Spiegel was ranked number 55 on the Forbes 400 with $13.8 billion in wealth. But as of August 2025 he has 2.5 billion in wealth.

In 2017, Spiegel became one of the youngest public company CEOs at age 26 when Snap began trading in March. Spiegel is also a member of the Berggruen Institute's 21st Century Council and its board of directors.

A Francophile, Spiegel learned French. In 2018, he and his son Hart received French citizenship through a clause in the naturalization laws that waives French residency requirements for applicants that contribute to the French culture or economy. In November 2022 he joined the board of directors for Gagosian Gallery.

=== Charity ===
In the same year, he gave $20 million to Stockton Scholars, a scholarship program in Stockton, California.

In 2022, at the Otis College of Art and Design commencement, Spiegel announced that he and Miranda Kerr would pay off the 2022 graduating class students' debt.

=== Controversy ===
In 2014, emails sent by Spiegel during his time at Stanford were leaked to Gawker. The emails included misogynistic and homophobic comments and openly encouraged getting women heavily drunk in an attempt to convince them to have sex. The emails included comments about getting his friends laid by wasted "sororisluts", and shooting lasers at "fat girls". He was also encouraging underage drinking.

Spiegel issued a statement responding to the controversy stating, "I'm obviously mortified and embarrassed that my idiotic emails during my fraternity days were made public. I have no excuse. I'm sorry I wrote them at the time and I was a jerk to have written them. They in no way reflect who I am today or my views towards women."
