= Snapchat =

American social media and messaging app

- Logo used since August 2019
- Original authors: Reggie Brown; Bobby Murphy; Evan Spiegel
- Developer: Snap Inc.
- Release: September 2011; 15 years ago

Stable release(s) [±]
- Android: 13.31.1.0 / 8 March 2025; 20 months ago
- iOS: 13.31.0.47 / 5 March 2025; 20 months ago

Preview release(s) [±]
- Operating system: Android 5.0 or later; iOS 14 or later; Web browser; watchOS 9 or later App Size: 64 MB (Android) 258 MB (iOS)
- Available in: 37 languages
- List of languages English, Arabic, Bengali, Danish, Dutch, Filipino, Finnish, French, German, Greek, Gujarati, Hindi, Indonesia, Italian, Japanese, Kannada, Korean, Malay, Malayalam, Marathi, Norwegian, Polish, Portuguese, Punjabi, Romanian, Russian, Simplified Chinese, Spanish, Swedish, Tamil, Telugu, Thai, Traditional Chinese, Turkish, Urdu, Vietnamese
- Type: Photo sharing; instant messaging; video chat; multimedia
- License: Proprietary software
- Website: snapchat.com

Snapchat is an American multimedia social media and instant messaging app and service developed by Snap Inc., originally Snapchat Inc. One of the principal features of the app are that pictures and messages, known as "Snaps", are typically only accessible for a brief period of time before their recipients can no longer access them. The app has evolved from originally focusing on person-to-person photo sharing to now showcasing users' "Stories" of 24 hours of chronological content, along with "Discover", letting brands show ad-supported short-form content. It also allows users to store photos in a password-protected area called "My Eyes Only". It has also reportedly incorporated limited use of end-to-end encryption, with intention to expand its use in the future.

Snapchat was created by Evan Spiegel, Bobby Murphy, and Reggie Brown, former students at Stanford University. It is known for representing a mobile-first direction for social media, and places significant emphasis on users interacting with virtual stickers and augmented reality objects. In 2023, Snapchat had over 300 million monthly active users. On average more than four billion Snaps were sent each day in 2020. Snapchat is popular among the younger generations, with most users being between ages 18 and 24. Snapchat is subject to privacy concerns with social networking services.

== History ==
=== Prototype ===
According to documents and deposition statements, Reggie Brown brought the idea for a disappearing-pictures application to Evan Spiegel because Evan Spiegel had prior business experience. Reggie Brown and Evan Spiegel then pulled in Bobby Murphy, who had experience coding. The three worked closely together for several months and launched Snapchat as "Picaboo" on the iOS operating system on July 8, 2011. Reggie Brown was ousted from the company months after it was launched.

The app was relaunched as Snapchat in September 2011, and the team focused on usability and technical aspects, rather than branding efforts. One exception was the decision to keep a mascot designed by Reggie Brown, "Ghostface Chillah", named after Ghostface Killah of the hip-hop group Wu-Tang Clan.

On May 8, 2012, Reggie Brown sent an email to Evan Spiegel during their senior year at Stanford, in which he offered to re-negotiate his equitable share regarding ownership of the company. Lawyers for Snapchat claimed that Reggie Brown had made no contributions of value to the company, and was therefore entitled to nothing. In September 2014, Brown settled with Spiegel and Murphy for $157.5 million and was credited as one of the original authors of Snapchat.

In their first blog post, dated May 9, 2012, CEO Evan Spiegel described the company's mission: "Snapchat isn't about capturing the traditional Kodak moment. It's about communicating with the full range of human emotion—not just what appears to be pretty or perfect." He presented Snapchat as the solution to stresses caused by the longevity of personal information on social media, evidenced by "emergency detagging of Facebook photos before job interviews and photoshopping blemishes out of candid shots before they hit the Internet".

=== Growth ===
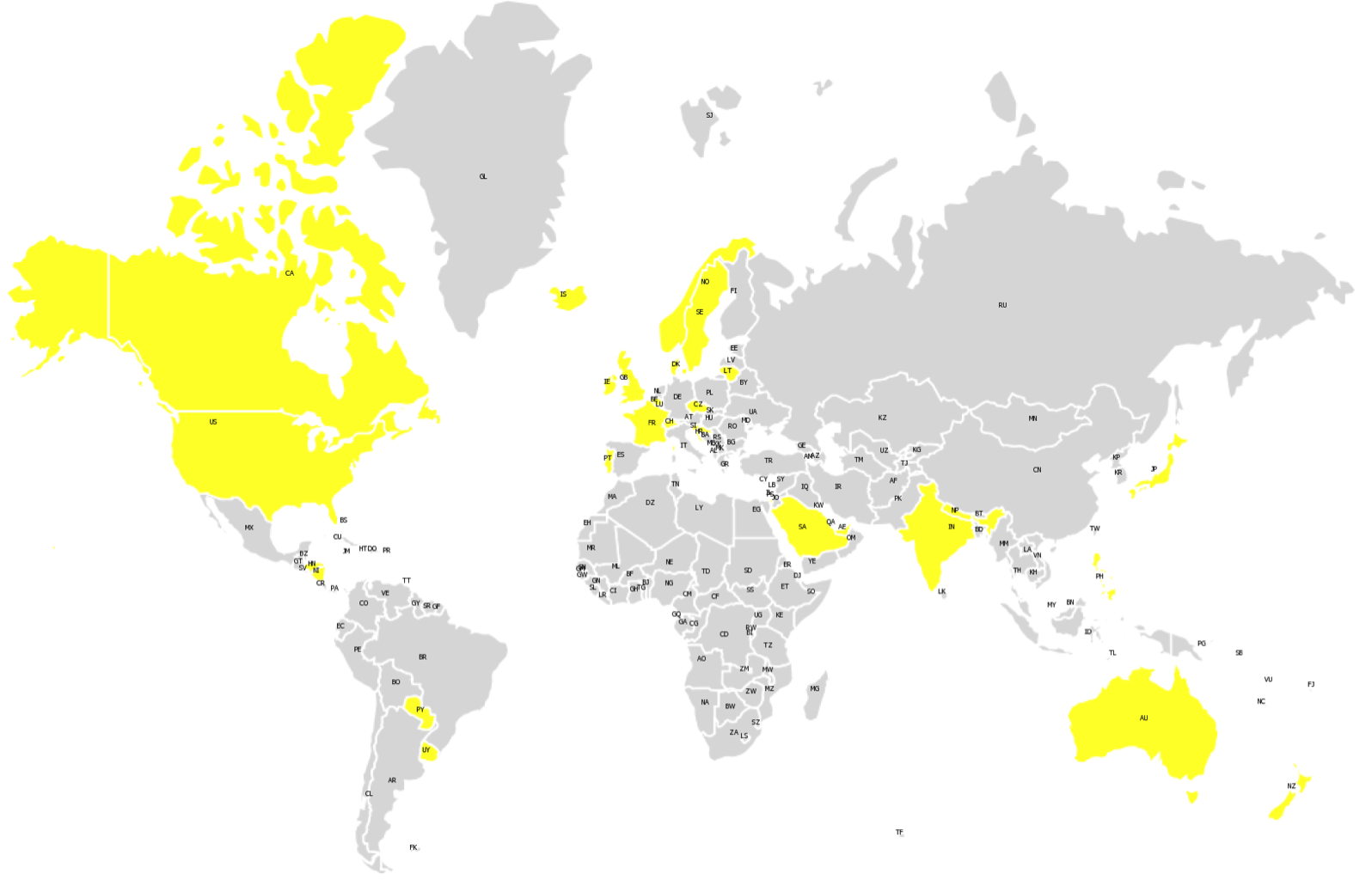
World map indicating Snapchat's core users by country in 2014. Map based on data from a report from Business Insider Intelligence.

As of May 2012, 25 Snapchat images were being sent per second and, as of October 2012, users had shared over one billion photos on the Snapchat iOS app, with 20 million photos being shared per day. That same month, Spiegel cited problems with user base scalability as the reason that Snapchat was experiencing some difficulties delivering its images, known as "snaps", in real time. Snapchat was released as an Android app on October 29, 2012.

In June 2013, Snapchat version 5.0, dubbed "Banquo", was released for iOS. The updated version introduced several speed and design enhancements, including swipe navigation, double-tap to reply, an improved friend finder, and in-app profiles. The name was a reference to a character from Shakespeare's Macbeth. At the same time, Snapchat introduced Snapkidz for users under 13 years of age. Snapkidz was part of the original Snapchat application and was activated when the user provided a date of birth to verify his/her age. Snapkidz allowed children to take snaps and draw on them, but they could not send snaps to other users and could save snaps only locally on the device being used.

According to Snapchat's published statistics, as of May 2015, the app's users were viewing 2 billion videos per day, reaching 6 billion by November. By 2016, Snapchat had hit 10 billion daily video views.

In May 2016, Snapchat raised $1.81 billion in equity offering, suggesting strong investor interest in the company. By May 31, 2016, the app had almost 10 million daily active users in the United Kingdom.

Investel Capital Corp., a Canadian company, sued Snapchat for infringement on its geofiltering patent in 2016. They were seeking "monetary compensation and an order that would prohibit California-based Snapchat from infringing on its patent in the future".

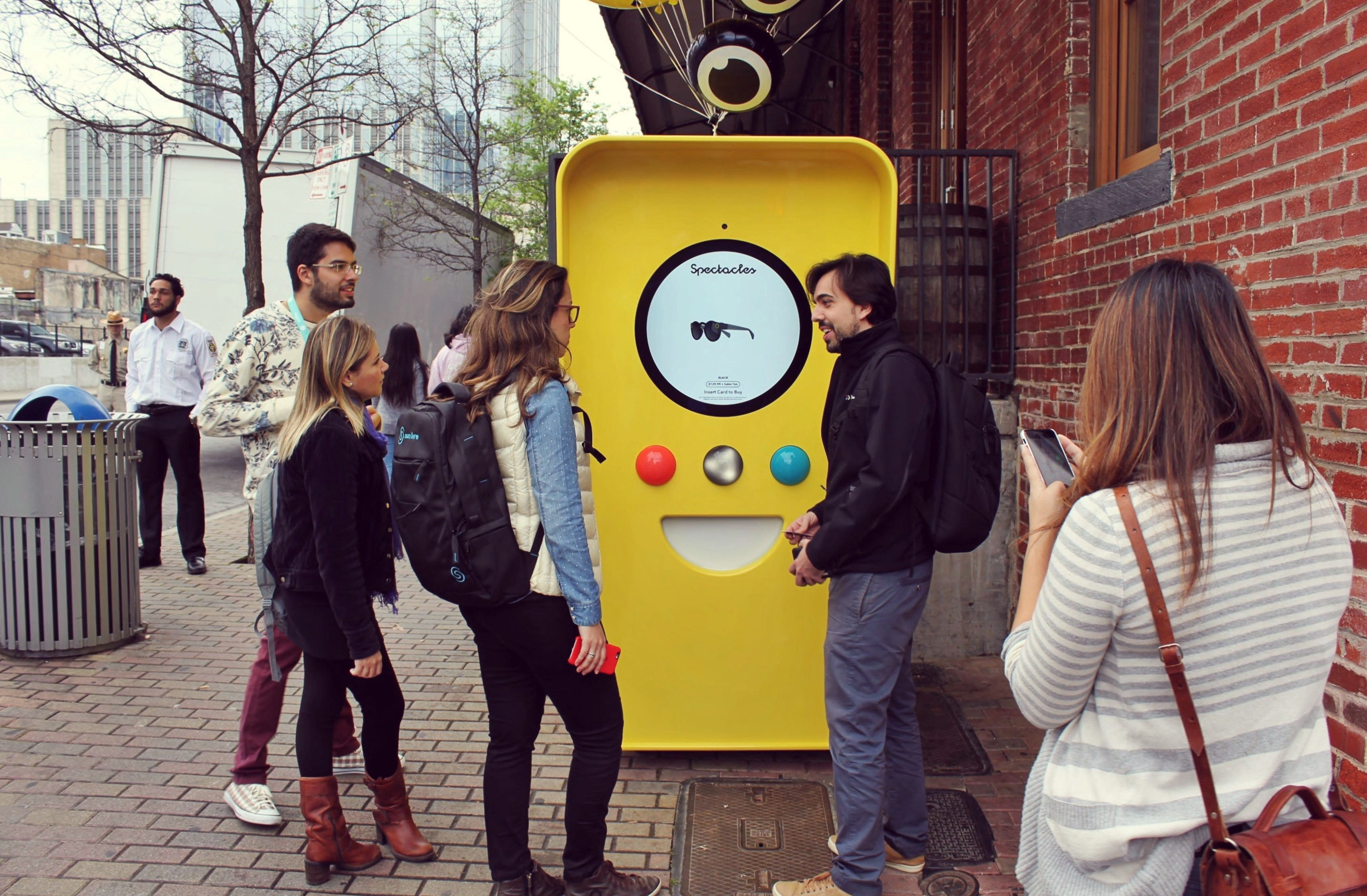
Snapchat Spectacles Vending Machine at SXSW 2017, Austin, Texas.

In September 2016, Snapchat Inc. was renamed Snap Inc. to coincide with the introduction of the company's first hardware product, Spectacles—smartglasses with a built-in camera that can record 10 seconds of video at a time. On February 20, 2017, Spectacles became available for purchase online.

In February 2017, Snapchat had 160 million daily active users, growing to 166 million in May.

In November 2017, Snapchat announced a redesign that proved controversial with many of its followers. CNBC's Ingrid Angulo listed some of the reasons why many disliked the update, citing that sending a snap and re-watching stories was more complicated, stories and incoming snaps were now listed on the same page, and that the Discover page now included featured and sponsored content. A tweet sent by Kylie Jenner in February 2018, which criticized the redesign of the Snapchat app, reportedly caused Snap Inc. to lose more than $1.3 billion in market value. Over 1.2 million people signed a Change.org petition asking the company to remove the new app update.

In December 2019, App Annie announced that Snapchat was the fifth most downloaded mobile app of the decade. The data included figures for iOS downloads starting from 2010 and Android downloads starting from 2012.

In January 2020, Snapchat acquired AI Factory, a computer vision startup, to give a boost to its video capabilities.

In November 2020, Snapchat announced it would pay a total of $1 million a day to users who post viral videos. The company has not stated the criteria for a video to be considered viral or how many people the payout would be split among. The promotion, called Snapchat Spotlight, was initially intended to run until the end of the year. In 2021, its payout structure changed as the company announced a shift from the $1 million per day model to a "millions per month" one. As of 2024, the program continued to operate.

In June 2022, Snapchat announced plans to launch Snapchat Plus, a paid subscription model. The subscription gives users early access to features, the ability to change the app icon and see which users rewatch their stories. In July 2022, the company reported that they had 347 million daily active users, an increase of 18% from the previous year. In August 2022, Snapchat announced that Snapchat Plus had more than 1 million subscribers and added four new features to the subscription including priority replies, post-view emoji, new Bitmoji content, and new app icons.

== Features ==
=== Core functionality ===
Snapchat is primarily used for creating multimedia messages referred to as "snaps"; snaps can consist of a photo or a short video, and can be edited to include filters and effects, text captions, and drawings. Snaps can be directed privately to selected contacts, or to a semi-public "Story" or a public "Story" called "Our Story". The ability to send video snaps was added as a feature option in December 2012. By holding down on the photo button while inside the app, a video of up to ten seconds in length can be captured. Spiegel explained that this process allowed the video data to be compressed into the size of a photo. A later update allowed the ability to record up to 60 seconds, but are still segmented into 10 second intervals. After a single viewing, the video disappears by default. On May 1, 2014, the ability to communicate via video chat was added. Direct messaging features were also included in the update, allowing users to send ephemeral text messages to friends and family while saving any needed information by clicking on it. According to CIO, Snapchat uses real-time marketing concepts and temporality to make the app appealing to users. According to Marketing Pro, Snapchat attracts interest and potential customers by combining the AIDA (marketing) model with modern digital technology.

Private message photo snaps can be viewed for a user-specified length of time (1 to 10 seconds as determined by the sender) before they become inaccessible. Users were previously required to hold down on the screen in order to view a snap; this behavior was removed in July 2015 The requirement to hold on the screen was intended to frustrate the ability to take screenshots of snaps; the Snapchat app does not prevent screenshots from being taken but can notify the sender if it detects that it has been saved. However, these notifications can be bypassed through either unauthorized modifications to the app or by obtaining the image through external means. One snap per day can be replayed for free. In September 2015, Snapchat introduced the option to purchase additional replays through in-app purchases. The ability to purchase extra replays was removed in April 2016.

Friends can be added via usernames and phone contacts, using customizable "Snapcodes", or through the "Add Nearby" function, which scans for users near their location who are also in the Add Nearby menu. Spiegel explained that Snapchat is intended to counteract the trend of users being compelled to manage an idealized online identity of themselves, which he says has "taken all of the fun out of communicating."

In November 2014, Snapchat introduced "Snapcash", a feature that lets users send and receive money to each other through private messaging. The payments system is powered by Square.

In July 2016, Snapchat introduced a new, optional feature known as "Memories". Memories allow snaps and story posts to be saved into a private storage area, where they can be viewed alongside other photos stored on the device, as well as edited and published as snaps, story posts, or messages anytime. When shared with a user's current story, the memory would have a timestamp to indicate its age. Content in the Memories storage area can be searched by date or using a local object recognition system. Snaps accessible within Memories can additionally be placed into a "My Eyes Only" area that is locked with a Personal identification number (PIN). Snapchat has stated that the Memories feature was inspired by the practice of manually scrolling through photos on a phone to show them to others. In April 2017, the white border around old memories was removed. While originally intended to let viewers know the material was old, TechCrunch wrote that the indicator "ended up annoying users who didn't want their snaps altered, sometimes to the point where they would decide not to share the old content at all."

In May 2017, an update made it possible to send snaps with unlimited viewing time, dropping the previous ten-second maximum duration, with the content disappearing after being deliberately closed by the recipient. New creative tools, namely the ability to draw with an emoji, videos that play in a loop, and an eraser that lets users remove objects in a photo with the app filling in the space with the background, were also released.

In July 2017, Snapchat started allowing users to add links to snaps, enabling them to direct viewers to specific websites; the feature was only available for brands previously. Additionally, the update added more creative tools: A "Backdrop" feature lets users cut out a specific object from their photo and apply colorful patterns to it in order to bring greater emphasis to that object, and "Voice Filters" enable users to remix the sounds of their voices in the snap. Voice Filters was previously available as part of the feature enabling augmented reality lenses, with the new update adding a dedicated speaker icon to remix the audio in any snap.

In June 2020, Snap announced "minis", embeddable apps that live inside the parent Snap app.

In August 2022, Snap launched the "Family Center" feature which allows parents to monitor the activity of their children, ages 13–18, within the app.

In September 2022, Snapchat announced Snapchat for Web, a web browser version of Snapchat.

In February 2023, Snapchat launched "My AI", a custom chatbot offering Snapchat+ users access to a mobile version of the AI chatbot ChatGPT. It followed up by announcing that its customizable My AI chatbot would be accessible to all users within the app in April 2023, a month after OpenAI allowed access to third parties, and would be available for group chats.

In June 2025, Snapchat was released for the Apple Watch.

In February 2026, Snapchat introduced creator subscriptions, allowing eligible creators to earn revenue directly from their followers within the app.

==== Filters, lenses, and stickers ====
Snaps can be personalized with various forms of visual effects and stickers. Geofilters are graphical overlays available if the user is within a certain geographical location, such as a city, event, or destination. Users can design and create their own geofilters for personal events at a fee of $10–15 USD per hour. They can also subscribe to an annual plan which ranges from $1,000 to $10,000 depending on the location, for a permanent filter. A similar feature known as Geostickers was launched in 10 major cities in 2016. Bitmoji are stickers featuring personalized cartoon avatars, which can be used in snaps and messaging. Bitmoji characters can also be used as World Lenses.

The "Lens" feature, introduced in September 2015, allows users to add real-time effects into their snaps by using face detection technology. This is activated by long-pressing on a face within the viewfinder. In April 2017, Snapchat extended this feature into "World Lenses", which use augmented reality technology to integrate 3D rendered elements (such as objects and animated characters) into scenes; these elements are placed and anchored in 3D space.

On October 26, 2018, at TwitchCon, Snap launched the Snap Camera desktop application for macOS and Windows PCs, which enables use of Snapchat lenses in videotelephony and live streaming services such as Skype, Twitch, YouTube, and Zoom. However, this was discontinued in January 2023. Snapchat also launched integration with Twitch, including an in-stream widget for Snapcodes, the ability to offer lenses to stream viewers and as an incentive to channel subscribers. Several video game-themed lenses were also launched at this time, including ones themed around League of Legends, Overwatch, and PlayerUnknown's Battlegrounds.

In August 2020, Snapchat collaborated with four TikTok influencers to launch Augmented Reality (AR) lenses to create a more interactive experience with users. The lenses now incorporate geo-locational mapping techniques to incorporate digital overlays onto real world surfaces. These lenses track 18 joints across the body to identify body movements, and generate effects around the body of the user. Advertising is now also utilizing AR lenses that make users a part of the advert. Coca-Cola, Pepsi and Taco Bell are just a select few of the brands now utilizing the tech on Snapchat. Consumers no longer scroll past these adverts, but become a part of them with AR lenses.

In March 2022, Snapchat launched the ability to share YouTube videos as stickers. The stickers function as clickable links that redirect users to a browser or the YouTube app.

==== Friend emojis ====
Friend emojis can be customized, however the default emojis are listed below. The snapscore, which states the amount of snaps one has sent and received is recorded and is visible to one's friends. If users tap their own score it shows the ratio of sent and received snaps, the amount of snaps they have sent is on the right and the amount of snaps they have received is on the left, these numbers combined are their Snapchat score. There are multiple synonyms for Snapchat score such as Snapchat points, Snapscore, Snap points and Snap Number. YouTube has a similar rewards system called "Perks". For Snapchat plus subscribers, best friends represented as planets, expanding the ways friendships are visually displayed beyond Friend Emojis.

As incentive to send content regularly, emoji icons will appear next to the names of contacts that the user frequently interacts with.
Emoji	Name	Snapchat meaning
💕	Super BFF	Appears next to the user's number 1 Best Friend when they are also their number 1 Best Friend for two months in a row.
❤️	BFF	Appears next to the user's number 1 Best Friend when they are also their number 1 Best Friend for two weeks in a row.
💛	Besties	Appears next to the user's number 1 Best Friend when they are also their number 1 Best Friend.
😊	BFs	Appears next to one of the user's Best Friends.
😬	Mutual Besties	Appears next to someone when the user's number 1 Best Friend is also their number 1 Best Friend.
😎	Mutual BFs	Appears next to someone whom the user shares a best friend with.
🔥	Snapstreak	Appears next to the number of days that the user and a friend have Snapped each other. If the user and their friend do not both send a Snap within 24 hours, they will lose their Snapstreak.
✨	Group Chat	Appears next to all of the user's group chats.
⌛️	Hourglass	Appears next to someone's name if the user's Snapstreak is going to end soon.
🎂	Birthday Cake	Appears next to someone when it is their birthday.

=== Stories and Discover ===
In October 2013, Snapchat introduced the "My Story" feature, which allows users to compile snaps into chronological storylines, accessible to all of their friends. By June 2014, photo and video snaps presented to friends in the Stories functionality had surpassed person-to-person private snaps as the most frequently used function of the service, with over one billion viewed per day—double the daily views tallied in April 2014.

In June 2014, the story feature was expanded to incorporate "Our Stories", which was then changed to "Live Stories" about a year later. The feature allows users on-location at specific events (such as music festivals or sporting events) to contribute snaps to a curated story advertised to all users, showcasing a single event from multiple perspectives and viewpoints. These curated snaps provided by the app's contributors and selected for the "Live" section could also be more localized, but Snapchat eventually scaled back the more personal imaging streams in order to emphasize public events.

An "Official Stories" designation was added in November 2015 to denote the public stories of notable figures and celebrities, similar to Twitter's "Verified account" program.

In January 2015, Snapchat introduced "Discover" an area containing channels of ad-supported short-form content from major publishers, including BuzzFeed, CNN, ESPN, Mashable, People, Vice and Snapchat itself among others. To address data usage concerns related to these functions, a "Travel Mode" option was added in August 2015. When activated, the feature prevents the automatic downloading of snaps until they are explicitly requested by the user.

In October 2016, the app was updated to replace its auto-advance functionality, which automatically moved users from one story to the next, with a "Story Playlist" feature, letting users select thumbnails of users in the list to play only selected stories.

In January 2017, Snapchat revamped its design, adding search functionality and a new global live "Our Story" feature, to which any user can contribute.

In May 2017, Snapchat introduced "Custom Stories", letting users collaboratively make stories combining their captures.

In June 2017, "Snap Map" was introduced, which allows users to optionally share their location with friends. A map display, accessible from the viewfinder, can be used to locate stories based on location data, supporting the use of Bitmoji as place markers. Entering a "Ghost Mode" hides the user from the map. The function is based on the app Zenly, which was acquired by Snap Inc. prior to its launch. The map data is supplied from OpenStreetMap and Mapbox, while satellite imagery comes from DigitalGlobe.

In February 2020, Snapchat released a Discover cartoon series called Bitmoji TV, which will star users' avatars.

In July 2026, Snapchat introduced a feature that allows users to share their real-time music listening activity from supported streaming services with friends through Snap Map.

==== Original video content ====
The Wall Street Journal reported in May 2017 that Snap Inc., the company developing Snapchat, had signed deals with NBCUniversal, A&E Networks, BBC, ABC, Metro-Goldwyn-Mayer and other content producers to develop original shows for viewing through Snapchat's "Stories" format. According to the report, Snap hoped to have several new shows available on a daily basis, with each show lasting between three and five minutes, and the company has sent out detailed reports to its partners on how to produce content for Snapchat. Over 2017 and 2018, Snap and partners launched several shows.

In, 2018 Snapchat and Vertical Networks (Snapchat Publisher Story) created a show called My Ex-BFF Court," which is a spoof of daytime-TV fare like the typical court shows we watch for example "Divorce Court" in which two ex-friends try to fix their problems. Who ever is guilty gets a funny sentence. Each episode is hosted by Judge Matteo Lane who is also known as Matthew Lane.

In 2018, Snapchat / Vertical Networks made a deal with Fox to make a television version of the dating and reality show Phone Swap.

In 2018, Snapchat got a new show called How Low Will You Go that was created by Above Average Productions and NBC.

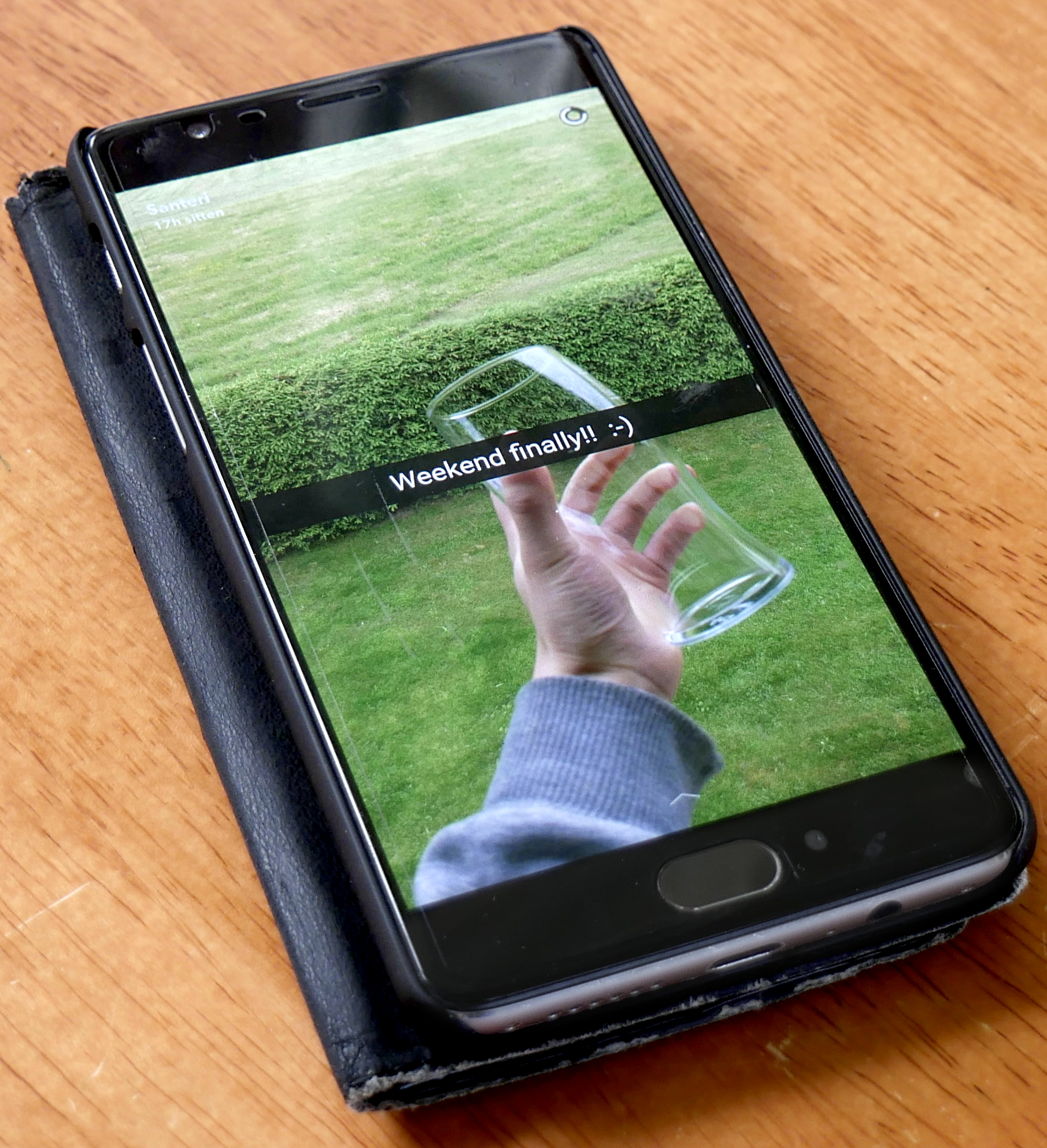
Example Snapchat "snap" on a smartphone

In contrast to other messaging apps, Spiegel described Snapchat's messaging functions as being "conversational", rather than "transactional", as they sought to replicate the conversations he engaged in with friends. Spiegel stated that he did not experience conversational interactions while using the products of competitors like iMessage.

Rather than a traditional online notification, a blue pulsing "here" button is displayed within the sender's chat window if the recipient is currently viewing their own chat window. When this button is held down, a video chat function is immediately launched. By default, messages disappear after they are read, and a notification is sent to the recipient only when they start to type. Users can also use messages to reply to snaps that are part of a story. The video chat feature uses technology from AddLive—a real-time communications provider that Snapchat acquired prior to the feature's launch.

In regards to the "Here" indicator, Spiegel explained that "the accepted notion of an online indicator that every chat service has is really a negative indicator. It means 'my friend is available and doesn't want to talk to you,' versus this idea in Snapchat where 'my friend is here and is giving you their full attention.'" Spiegel further claimed that the Here video function prevents the awkwardness that can arise from apps that use typing indicators because, with text communication, conversations lose their fluidity as each user tries to avoid typing at the same time.

On March 29, 2016, Snapchat launched a major revision of the messaging functionality known as "Chat 2.0", adding stickers, easier access to audio and video conferencing, the ability to leave audio or video "notes", and the ability to share recent camera photos. The implementation of these features are meant to allow users to easily shift between text, audio, and video chat as needed while retaining an equal level of functionality. In June 2018, Snapchat added the feature of deleting a sent message (including; audio, video, and text) before it is read. A feature introduced in August 2018 allows users to send Musical GIFs, TuneMojis.

In August 2022, Snap Inc. announced it would discontinue all original scripted content with no plans to continue work in this direction.

In 2023, Snapchat had over 300 million monthly active users. In 2024, the countries with the most Snapchat users were India with 202.5 million users, followed by the United States with 106.5 million, Pakistan 31.9 million, France 27.5 million and the United Kingdom 23.1 million.

=== Encryption ===
In January 2018, Snapchat introduced the use of end-to-end encryption in the application but only for snaps (pictures and video), according to a Snapchat security engineer presenting at the January 2019 Real World Crypto Conference. As of the January 2019 conference Snapchat had plans to introduce end-to-end encryption for text messages and group chats in the future.

== Business and multimedia ==
=== Demographics ===
Snapchat is popular among the younger generations, with most users being between 18 and 24 in 2023. On the app store, the age classification is 12+. In 2014, researchers from the University of Washington and Seattle Pacific University designed a user survey to help understand how and why the application was being used. The researchers originally hypothesized that due to the ephemeral nature of Snapchat messages, its use would be predominantly for privacy-sensitive content including the much talked about potential use for sexual content and sexting. However, it appears that Snapchat is used for a variety of creative purposes that are not necessarily privacy-related at all.

In the study, only 1.6% of respondents reported using Snapchat primarily for sexting, although 14.2% admitted to having sent sexual content via Snapchat at some point. These findings suggest that users do not seem to utilize Snapchat for sensitive content. Rather, the primary use for Snapchat was found to be for comedic content such as "stupid faces" with 59.8% of respondents reporting this use most commonly. The researchers also determined how Snapchat users do not use the application and what types of content they are not willing to send. They found that the majority of users are not willing to send content classified as sexting (74.8% of respondents), photos of documents (85.0% of respondents), messages containing legally questionable content (86.6% of respondents), or content considered mean or insulting (93.7% of respondents).

The study results also suggested that Snapchat's success is not due to its security properties, but because the users found the application to be fun. The researchers found that users seem to be well-aware (79.4% of respondents) that recovering snaps is possible and a majority of users (52.8% of respondents) report that this does not affect their behavior and use of Snapchat. Many users (52.8% of respondents) were found to use an arbitrary timeout length on snaps regardless of the content type or recipient. The remaining respondents were found to adjust their snaps' timeout depending on the content or the recipient. Reasons for adjusting the time length of snaps included the level of trust and relationship with the recipient, the time needed to comprehend the snap, and avoiding screenshots.

=== Communication ===
In the 2010s, Snapchat was seen as a messenger focused more on in-the-moment way sharing and less on the accumulation of permanent material. Building on this distinction by launching as a mobile-first company, Snapchat, in the midst of the app revolution and the growing presence of cellular communication, did not have to make the transition to mobile in the way other competing social media networks had to do. Evan Spiegel himself described Snapchat as primarily a camera company. Spiegel also dismissed past comparisons to other social media networks such as Facebook and Twitter when he was asked if the 2016 presidential race was going to be remembered as the Snapchat election, although major candidates did occasionally use the app to reach voters. Nevertheless, the mobile app offered distinct publication, media, and news content within its Discover channel. Snapchat attempted to distinguish brand content and user-based messaging and sharing.

=== Monetization ===
Snapchat's developing features embody a deliberate strategy of monetization.

Snapchat announced its then-upcoming advertising efforts on October 17, 2014, when it acknowledged its need for a revenue stream. The company stated that it wanted to evaluate "if we can deliver an experience that's fun and informative, the way ads used to be, before they got creepy and targeted." Snapchat's first paid advertisement, in the form of a 20-second movie trailer for the horror film Ouija, was shown to users on October 19, 2014.

In January 2015, Snapchat began making a shift from focusing on growth to monetization. The company launched its "Discover" feature, which allowed for paid advertising by presenting short-form content from publishers. Its initial launch partners included CNN, Comedy Central, ESPN and Food Network, among others. In June 2015, Snapchat announced that it would allow advertisers to purchase sponsored geofilters for snaps; an early customer of the offering was McDonald's, who paid for a branded geofilter covering its restaurant locations in the United States. Snapchat made a push to earn ad revenue from its "Live Stories" feature in 2015, after initially launching the feature in 2014. Ad placements can be sold within a live story, or a story can be pitched by a sponsor. Live stories are estimated to reach an average of 20 million viewers in a 24-hour span.

=== Campaigns ===
In September 2015, the service entered into a partnership with the National Football League to present live stories from selected games (including a Sunday game, and marquee games such as Monday Night Football and Thursday Night Football), with both parties contributing content and handling ad sales. The 2015 Internet Trends Report by Mary Meeker highlighted the significant growth of vertical video viewing. Vertical video ads like Snapchat's are watched in their entirety nine times more than landscape video ads.

In April 2016, NBC Olympics announced that it had reached a deal with Snapchat to allow stories from the 2016 Summer Olympics to be featured on Snapchat in the United States. The content would include a behind-the-scenes Discover channel curated by BuzzFeed (a company which NBCUniversal has funded), and stories featuring a combination of footage from NBC, athletes, and attendees. NBC sold advertising and entered into revenue sharing agreements. This marked the first time NBC allowed Olympics footage to be featured on third-party property.

In May 2016, as part of a campaign to promote X-Men: Apocalypse, 20th Century Fox paid for the entire array of lenses to be replaced by those based on characters from the X-Men series and films for a single day. In July 2016, it was reported that Snapchat had submitted a patent application for the process of using an object recognition system to deliver sponsored filters based on objects seen in a camera view. Later that year, in September 2016, Snapchat released its first hardware product, called the Spectacles. Evan Spiegel, CEO of Snap Inc., called it "a toy" but saw it as an upside to freeing his app from smartphone cameras.

In April 2017, Digiday reported that Snapchat would launch a self-service manager for advertising on the platform. The feature launched the following month, alongside news of a Snapchat Mobile Dashboard for tracking ad campaigns, which rolled out in June to select countries. Also in 2017, Snapchat introduced a "Snap to Store" advertising tool that lets companies using geostickers to track whether users buy their product or visit their store in a 7-day period after seeing the relevant geosticker. On November 13, 2018, Snapchat announced the launch of the Snap Store, where they sell Bitmoji merchandise personalized by avatars from users and their friends. Items for sale include shirts, mugs, shower curtains, and phone cases.

=== Development platform ===
In June 2018, Snapchat announced a new third-party development platform known as Snap Kit: a suite of components that allows partners to provide third-party integrations with aspects of the service. "Login Kit" is a social login platform that utilizes Snapchat accounts. It was promoted as being more privacy-conscious than competing equivalents, as services are only able to receive the user's display name (and, optionally, a Bitmoji avatar) and are subject to a 90-day inactivity timeout, preventing them from being able to collect any further personal information or social graphs through their authorization. "Creative Kit" allows apps to generate their own stickers to overlay into Snapchat posts. "Story Kit" can be used to embed and aggregate publicly posted stories (with for example, Bandsintown using Story Kit to aggregate stories posted by musicians), while "Bitmoji Kit" allows Bitmoji stickers to be integrated into third-party apps.

=== Snap Originals ===
In response to industry competition from streaming platforms such as Netflix, Snapchat announced in late 2018 that it would diversify its content by launching Snap Originals (episodic content including both scripted shows and documentaries).

In June 2020, Snapchat announced the creation of its first-ever "shoppable" original show called The Drop, which focused on "exclusive streetwear collage" from celebrities and designers. Each episode explored the relationship between the designer and celebrity collaborator. Viewers would learn about the item for sale and how it came together, as well as what time that day the item would go up for sale. Later that day, at the aforementioned time, the episode would be updated with more content that included a "swipe up to buy" action.

All projects related to original programming were ended in August 2022.

== Premium accounts and sexual content ==
In 2014, Snapchat introduced a new feature called Snapcash which spurred its popularity among adult content creators.

Snapchat allows private premium accounts in which users can monetize their content. This feature is mostly used by models to monetize their adult content. In 2019, CNBC reported that "Snapchat is increasingly becoming an integral part of the online porn industry."

== Controversies ==
=== December 2013 hack ===
Snapchat was hacked on December 31, 2013. Gibson Security, an Australian security firm, had disclosed an API security vulnerability to the company on August 27, 2013, and then made public the source code for the exploit on December 25. On December 27, Snapchat announced that it had implemented mitigating features. Nonetheless, an anonymous group hacked them, saying that the mitigating features presented only "minor obstacles". The hackers revealed parts of approximately 4.6 million Snapchat usernames and phone numbers on a website named SnapchatDB.info and sent a statement to the popular technology blog TechCrunch saying that their objective had been to "raise public awareness... and... put public pressure on Snapchat" to fix the vulnerability. Snapchat apologized a week after the hack.

=== Federal Trade Commission ===
==== Self-deletion of images ====
In 2014, Snapchat settled a complaint made by the US Federal Trade Commission (FTC). The government agency alleged that the company had exaggerated to the public the degree to which mobile app images and photos could be made to self-delete. Under the terms of the agreement, Snapchat was not fined, but the app service agreed to have its claims and policies monitored by an independent party for a period of 20 years. The FTC concluded that Snapchat was prohibited from "misrepresenting the extent to which it maintains the privacy, security, or confidentiality of users' information."

Following the agreement, Snapchat updated its privacy page to state that the company "can't guarantee that messages will be deleted within a specific timeframe." Even after Snapchat deletes message data from their servers, that same data may remain in backup for a time. In a public blog post, the service warned that "If you've ever tried to recover lost data after accidentally deleting a drive or maybe watched an episode of CSI, you might know that with the right forensic tools, it's sometimes possible to retrieve data after it has been deleted."

==== User and non-user data collection ====
In September 2024, the FTC released a report summarizing nine company responses (including from Snapchat) to orders made by the agency pursuant to Section 6(b) of the Federal Trade Commission Act of 1914 to provide information about user and non-user data collection (including of children and teenagers) and data use by the companies that found that the companies' user and non-user data practices put individuals vulnerable to identity theft, stalking, unlawful discrimination, emotional distress and mental health issues, social stigma, and reputational harm.

=== Windows app ===
In November 2014, Snapchat announced a crackdown on third-party apps of its service and their users. Users of the Windows Phone platform were affected, as Snapchat did not have an official client for it, but numerous third-party apps existed, most popularly one called 6snap. In December, Microsoft was forced to remove 6snap and all other third-party apps of Snapchat from the Windows Phone Store; Snapchat however did not develop an official app for the platform, leaving its users on the platform behind. A petition from users requesting an official Snapchat app reached 43,000 signatures in 2015, but the company still refused to respond and to build an app for Windows Phone. Snapchat was criticized once again later in 2015 when it did not develop an app for Microsoft's Universal Windows Platform (UWP).

=== "Poor Country" remark ===
According to former Snapchat employee Anthony Pompliano in a lawsuit filed against Snap Inc., Spiegel made a statement in 2015 that Snapchat is "only for rich people" and that he does not "want to expand into poor countries like India and Spain". The incident sparked a Twitter trend called "#UninstallSnapchat", in which Indian users uninstalled the app, and caused backlash against the company, including a large number of low "one-star" ratings for the app in the Google Play Store and Apple's App Store. Snapchat's shares fell by 1.5%. In response to the allegation, Snapchat called Pompliano's claim "ridiculous", and elaborated that "Obviously Snapchat is for everyone. It's available worldwide to download for free."

=== Pompliano lawsuit ===
In January 2017, Pompliano filed a state lawsuit accusing Snapchat of doctoring growth metrics with the intention of deceiving investors. Pompliano said that Spiegel was dismissive of his concerns and that Pompliano was fired shortly thereafter. The judge dropped Pompliano's claims that Snapchat violated the Dodd-Frank and Consumer Protection Acts in retaliation against him, citing an arbitration clause in his contract. However, Snap Inc. faced blowback over a lack of disclosure regarding the contents of the lawsuit, resulting in plunging stock prices, several class-action lawsuits, and Federal investigations.

=== "Snap Map" privacy concerns ===
The June 2017 release of "Snap Map", a feature that broadcasts the user's location on a map, was met with concerns over privacy and safety. The feature, through an opt-in, delivers a message asking if the user would like to show their position on the map, but reportedly does not explain the ramifications of doing so, including that the app updates the user's position on the map each time the app is opened and not just when actively capturing snaps, potentially assisting stalkers. The map can be zoomed in to feature detailed geographical information, such as street addresses. The Daily Telegraph reported that police forces had issued child safety warnings, while other media publications wrote that safety concerns were also raised for teenagers and adults unaware of the feature's actual behavior. In a statement to The Verge, a Snapchat spokesperson said that "The safety of our community is very important to us and we want to make sure that all Snapchatters, parents, and educators have accurate information about how the Snap Map works". Users have the ability to operate in "Ghost Mode", or select the friends that they wish to share their location with. Although there has been an increase in advertising on Snapchat, Snapchat has stated that they do not plan on running ads on Snap Map stories.

=== Body image concerns ===
The increased use of body and facial reshaping applications such as Snapchat and Facetune has been identified as a potential cause of body dysmorphic disorder. In August 2018, researchers from the Boston Medical Center wrote in a JAMA Facial Plastic Surgery essay that a phenomenon they called 'Snapchat dysmorphia' had been identified, where people request surgery to look like the edited version of themselves as they appear through Snapchat Filters.

=== Snapchat employees abused data access to spy on users ===
In May 2019, it was revealed that multiple Snapchat employees used an internal tool called SnapLion, originally designed to gather data in compliance with law enforcement requests, to spy on users.

=== Revenge porn ===
During the 2020 lockdown to inhibit the spread of COVID-19 in France, the app emerged as a hub for the dissemination of revenge porn of underage girls. Some users have also reported that perpetrators of revenge porn have utilized explicit images to seek sexual favors or powers over individuals.

In 2020, a woman in North Carolina sued Snapchat (as well as dating app Tinder and the five men named in the attack), claiming features of the app enabled her alleged rapist and his friends to hide evidence of the rape. In particular, the suit alleges that "because of the ways Snapchat is and has been designed, constructed, marketed, and maintained, [the woman's assailants] were able to send these nonconsensual, pornographic photographs and videos of [her] with little to no threat of law enforcement verifying that they did so." The woman told the court that parent company Snap Inc. "specifically and purposely designed, constructed, and maintained Snapchat to serve as a secretive and nefarious communications platform that encourages, solicits, and facilitates the creation and dissemination of illicit and non-consensual sexually explicit content...and allowed Snapchat to operate as a safe-haven from law enforcement."

=== Sale of fake pills ===
In December 2022, the National Crime Prevention Council wrote U.S. Attorney General Merrick Garland urging the Justice Department to examine Snap's business practices related to the sale of fake pills containing lethal amounts of the synthetic opioid fentanyl. Less than a month later, the Federal Bureau of Investigation (FBI) launched a probe into the company and the sale of fake pills.

=== Grooming ===
In November 2024, British children's charity the NSPCC reported that according to statistics provided to them by the police, that the most popular app amongst online groomers was Snapchat.

=== Snapchat Speed Filter Crashes ===
In September 2015, Christal McGee was driving her Mercedes-Benz C230 in Georgia when she collided with a Mitsubishi Outlander at 107 mph. The high-speed crash severely injured the driver of the Mitsubishi, Wentworth Maynard, who required five weeks of intensive care and was left with a permanent brain injury. In April 2016, Maynard sued both McGee and Snapchat, claiming that McGee was using the Snapchat “speed filter” at the time of the crash. The lawsuit further alleged that Snapchat negligently allowed the feature despite knowing it encouraged dangerous speeding. In March 2022, the Georgia Supreme Court ruled that Snapchat must face claims that it defectively designed the “speed filter” application.

In May 2017, a group of teens in Wisconsin used Snapchat's "speed filter" to capture their car's speed as it reached 123 mph on a rural road. Moments later, the vehicle crashed into a tree, killing all three occupants. In May 2019, the families of two passengers, Hunter Morby and Landen Brown, filed a lawsuit against Snapchat, alleging that the company knew the filter encouraged reckless speeding among young users but failed to restrict its use. The case, Lemmon v. Snap, led to a landmark legal precedent. In May 2021, the 9th U.S. Circuit Court of Appeals ruled that Section 230 of the Communications Decency Act–which typically shields tech companies from liability for content created by users–did not bar the families' claims. The court distinguished between protecting platforms from liability for user-generated content and protecting them from liability for negligent product design, finding that the speed filter was a feature Snapchat itself had created. This decision allowed the case to proceed, marking a significant precedent for holding tech companies accountable for the design of their products. In 2021, Snap Inc. settled the lawsuit for an undisclosed amount.

In June 2021, a month after the 9th Circuit ruling, Snapchat removed the “speed filter”, citing its limited use for its removal. The decision came after mounting pressure from safety advocates, legal experts, and families affected by crashes allegedly linked to the feature. Critics had long argued that the filter incentivized reckless behavior, particularly among young and impressionable drivers, and called for stronger accountability from social media companies to prioritize user safety.

=== AI selfies in ads ===
Snapchat's My Selfie feature allows users selfies to be used by generative AI to "generate novel images of you". The features includes a toggle to "See My Selfie in Ads" which is enabled by default.

=== Introduction of Storage charges ===
In September 2025, Snap Inc announced it would start charging users if they have more than five gigabytes worth of previously shared images and videos saved as Memories, a service that was previously offered with unlimited storage for free. The decision received widespread criticism online, with many calling the fee a "memory tax", expressing concerns over losing the years worth of memories they had saved on the Snapchat. Many long-time users of the app considered the feature to be their primary factor for keeping the app downloaded. While the company claimed it was for sustainability reasons rather than monetization, commentators likened the move as economic coercion built on scientifically documented cognitive vulnerabilities related to loss aversion.

=== Australia and Russia Ban ===
At the start of December 2025, Russia's internet and media regulator stated that it had blocked Snapchat under claims that it was being used for "extremist and terrorist" activity. On December 10, 2025, Australia also banned Snapchat for anyone under the age of 16 as part of the Online Safety Amendment (Social Media Minimum Age) Act 2024.

=== Hacking Incidents ===
On 4 February 2026, a man from Illinois, Kyle Svara, pleaded guilty to phishing the Snapchat access codes of nearly 600 women in order to hack their accounts and steal nude photos, which he kept, sold or traded on the internet. He circumvented the site's authentication checks by asking women for their security codes in messages claiming to be from Snapchat support.

=== Safety concerns of the British Government ===
As part of Britain's Online Safety Act, Ofcom told Snapchat to show by 30 April 2026 how they would tighten age checks and restrict strangers from connecting with children.

== Surveillance ==
Private conversations are surveiled for any suspicious messages and will be automatically reported to the Federal Bureau of Investigation.

== Lawsuits ==
In June 2026, the parents of a 12-year-old Missouri girl filed suit against Snap, Inc. and the man convicted of raping her, alleging that Snapchat's design—including its friend-recommendation and location-sharing features—made it easier for the adult to locate, contact, and groom their daughter before the assault.

== See also ==
- Can't Look Away: The Case Against Social Media – 2025 documentary which features Snapchat
- Censorship of Snapchat – Restriction of access to Snapchat by governments and organizations
- Comparison of cross-platform instant messaging clients
- Instagram face – Beauty standard based on digitally altered photographs
- Picsart – Armenian Cross-platform design, photo and video editing platform
- Purikura – Japanese photo sticker booths which had earlier used Snapchat-like filters
- Sobrr – Another mobile application which deletes content after a specified time
- Timeline of social media
- Yahoo – American web portal
- Yo – Smartphone app
- Yubo – French social networking platform
