= Reggie Brown (Snapchat) =

Co-creator of Snapchat

- Born: Frank Reginald Brown; January 17, 1990 (age 36); Mt Pleasant, South Carolina , U.S.
- Education: The McCallie School; Stanford University

Frank Reginald Brown is one of the original creators of Snapchat, originally named Picaboo.

== Early life ==
Reggie Brown attended high school at The McCallie School, before attending Stanford University in 2008, where he majored in English. In 2011, Brown came up with an idea of a disappearing messaging app that allows users to send disappearing photo messages. He later shared the idea with his friend Evan Spiegel. In the early days, Brown was the company's CMO, coming up with the name Picaboo and designing its mascot, now known as "Ghostface Chillah".

== Lawsuit ==
In February 2013, Brown sued Evan Spiegel and Bobby Murphy, for being ousted from the company months after it was launched being one of the original founders of Snapchat. In September 2014, Snapchat settled the lawsuit for $157.5 million.
