= Allie Rowbottom =

American writer (born 1986)

Allie Rowbottom is an American writer known for her 2018 memoir Jell-O Girls and her debut novel Aesthetica about a former Instagram model with a plastic surgery addiction.

== Education ==
Rowbottom received her BA from New York University's Gallatin School of Individualized Study, her MFA from the California Institute of the Arts (where she was mentored by Maggie Nelson), and her PhD in literature and creative writing from the University of Houston.

== Work ==
=== Jell-O Girls: A Family History ===
The memoir follows three women in Rowbottom's family and investigates the roles of domesticity in the American kitchen over generations. Starting with Midge (Rowbottom's grandmother), then detailing Mary's life (Rowbottom's mother) and finally focusing on Rowbottom herself. The memoir discusses the dessert specifically because Rowbottom's great-great-grandmother's sister's husband's father bought the Jell-O patent in 1899 for $450, and because of Rowbottom's own account of her eating disorder and her active struggle with only eating foods, like Jell-O, that have a low calorie count.

The book starts with Rowbottom feeding her dying mother Jell-O, the only food her mother could keep down at the time. Rowbottom's mother eventually died in 2015 at age 70. Rowbottom was not able to finish the book before her mother's death.

=== Aesthetica ===
Told in two timelines–2017 and the near future, 2032–Aesthetica follows @annawrey, who at the age of 19 moves from Houston to Los Angeles to become an Instagram influencer, and at the age of 35, cloisters herself in a moldy hotel room in Burbank to contemplate Aesthetica(TM), a risky surgery designed to undo all her past cosmetic procedures and reset her face to its natural, aged state.

== Personal life ==
Rowbottom was raised in New England and New York City and is now based in Los Angeles. She is married to the writer Jon Lindsey.
