= Aesthetica (novel) =

2022 debut novel by Allie Rowbottom

- Author: Allie Rowbottom
- Language: English
- Genre: Fiction
- Publication date: 2022

Aesthetica is a 2022 debut novel by American writer Allie Rowbottom whose first book was the 2018 memoir Jell-O Girls. Aesthetica was published by Soho Press. The novel follows Anna, a celebrity Instagram influencer, who fifteen years after the height of her fame contemplates an experimental plastic surgery, Aesthetica, which would return her face to its "natural" state.

== Writing and development ==
Rowbottom attempted to write a follow-up to her 2018 memoir Jell-O Girls in the six months after its publication. Rowbottom had been considering the idea of writing a novel about a person with an Instagram following for some time but was delayed by circumstances including the theft of her laptop. The novel's focus on social media, plastic surgery, beauty standards, and their impact on women was inspired by Rowbottom's perception that "nobody" was writing about those subjects.

== Reception ==
=== Critical reception ===
In a positive review published by Astra, Philippa Snow praised Rowbottom's prose, referring to it as "poetic, and quite often sweetly melancholic" instead of the "cool and clinical style" Snow anticipates audiences might expect from a novel with "a subject that is internet-adjacent". Kirkus characterized Rowbottom's writing as alternating between "striking imagery" and "staccato simplicity", granting it an "entrancing quality, like the best social media algorithms".

=== Accolades ===
The novel was included on lists published by NPR, Vanity Fair, and Glamour of the best books of 2022.
