= Sticker (messaging) =

Illustrations used in electronic messaging

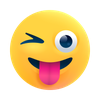

A sticker is a detailed illustration of a character that represents an emotion or action that is a mix of cartoons and Japanese smiley-like "emojis" sent through instant messaging platforms. They have more variety than emoticons and have a basis from internet "reaction face" culture due to their ability to portray body language with a facial reaction. Stickers are elaborate, character-driven emoticons and give people a lightweight means to communicate through kooky animations.

== History ==
Stickers were first popularized by the Korean-developed mobile messaging app Line. Naver developed the app with the Japanese market in mind, as KakaoTalk was already the dominant mobile messaging service in South Korea. The stickers' blend of the ubiquitous emoji system with anime-styled artwork, and their use as a substitute for typing out longer messages in Japanese text, helped the feature appeal to Japanese audiences. As Line's dominance grew, the mascot characters featured within Line's sticker sets also became popular as merchandise.

In 2013, stickers began to expand beyond Asian markets: Path added stickers in March 2013 as part of its new private messaging system, followed by Facebook's main and Facebook Messenger mobile apps in April. In July, sticker functionality was extended to Facebook's web interface, while Kik Messenger also added stickers. Startup companies devoted to stickers also emerged, helping produce them on behalf of brands as part of advertising campaigns.

By November 2013, a survey of mobile messaging users found that 40% of those surveyed used stickers on a daily basis, with Indonesians showing the highest amount of daily usage (46%), followed by China (43%), South Korea (38%) and the United States (35%). Out of those who did regularly use stickers, 20% had paid for stickers or emoji in mobile messaging apps at least once.

In 2016, Snapchat acquired Bitstrips for its app Bitmoji, which allows users to create custom stickers featuring a personal avatar. The same year, Apple added the iMessage App Store to iOS 10, which supports the addition of sticker providers among other third-party add-ons.

In July 2019, Telegram introduced animated stickers, using a new format .tgs, with support for third-party sticker packs. In December, Signal introduced sticker packs in PNG and WebP formats and APNG for animation. Later, in July 2020, WhatsApp implemented animated stickers with several official packs. In June 2021, Discord added the capability for premium users to use animated stickers.

In September 2023, Instagram and Facebook Messenger introduced the ability to add AI-generated stickers. Within a week, there were reports of people issuing inappropriate prompts involving celebrities or copyrighted characters, such as Elmo holding a knife.

== Use and model ==
Stickers are commonly downloadable for free, but some services may offer premium options via microtransactions, often described as stickers as a service. Sets may be devoted to specific themes, characters, as well as popular brands and media franchises such as Hello Kitty, Psy, and the Minions of Despicable Me.
