= JAMA Facial Plastic Surgery =

- Discipline: Plastic surgery
- Language: English
- Edited by: John S. Rhee

Publication details
- Former name: Archives of Facial Plastic Surgery
- History: 1999-2019
- Publisher: American Medical Association (United States)
- Frequency: Bimonthly
- Impact factor: 4.667 (2021)

Standard abbreviations
- ISO 4: JAMA Facial Plast. Surg.

Indexing
- ISSN: 2168-6076 (print); 2168-6092 (web)
- LCCN: 2012200146
- OCLC no.: 798256458

Links
- Journal homepage; Online access; Online archive

JAMA Facial Plastic Surgery was a peer-reviewed medical journal published by the American Medical Association. It was established in 1999 as the Archives of Facial Plastic Surgery. The founding editor was Wayne F Larrabee Jr (The Larrabee Center). The title was changed in 2013 in concert with founding of the JAMA Network and rebranding of associated specialty journals. Its content included all aspects of reconstructive and cosmetic surgery of the head and neck.

Through the end of 2019, it was an official journal of the American Academy of Facial Plastic and Reconstructive Surgery, the European Academy of Facial Plastic Surgery and the International Federation of Facial Plastic Surgery Societies. The editor-in-chief was John S. Rhee (Medical College of Wisconsin). According to Journal Citation Reports, the journal received a 2021 impact factor of 4.667, placing it in the upper echelon of titles covering aesthetic, cranial, facial, maxillofacial, plastic, and reconstructive surgery.

Effective January 2020, the title was superseded by Facial Plastic Surgery & Aesthetic Medicine published by Mary Ann Liebert, Inc.

== Abstracting and indexing ==
The journal is abstracted and indexed in Index Medicus/MEDLINE/PubMed.

== See also ==
- List of American Medical Association journals
