= Doctor Who in the United States and Canada =

Aspect of the series's broadcast history

British science fiction television series Doctor Who debuted on North American television in January 1965 on the Canadian Broadcasting Corporation (CBC). It appeared in syndication in the United States beginning in 1972. This article explores the connections of that series to distribution, broadcast and fandom in Canada and the United States.

== History ==
=== The beginning ===
Doctor Who had an early Canadian connection. The series was conceived by Canadian expatriate Sydney Newman while he was the BBC's Head of Drama. The series may have been inspired by a short-lived segment (canceled because parents complained that it was "too frightening" for their children) on the Canadian version of Howdy Doody. The segment featured a character surprisingly similar to the Doctor, a puppet called Mr. X who traveled through time and space in his "Whatsis Box" teaching children about history. Newman oversaw this series while working as head of programming for the CBC. Newman maintained a guiding influence over Doctor Who until he left the BBC in 1967 and was in talks with the BBC in 1986, when the show was foundering, to reformat the show and take the role of executive producer.

The series made its North American premiere in January 1965 on CBC with the broadcast of William Hartnell's first 26 episodes, fourteen months following their first airing on the BBC. The CBC did not renew the program and it would not reappear on the network for 40 years.

The film Dr. Who and the Daleks would be the very first exposure of Doctor Who in the United States released in July 1966. However, because the TV series was relatively unknown at the time, the film performed poorly in the box office.

=== The 1970s: Doctor Who sold to the United States ===
The BBC series was originally sold to television stations in the United States in 1972, with Time-Life Television syndicating selected episodes of Jon Pertwee's time as the Doctor. The series did not do well, despite an interesting write-up some years earlier in TV Guide. Apparently, program directors of the commercial television stations that picked up the Pertwee series did not know that the program was an episodic serial, and so it was constantly being shuffled about in the programming schedules.

In 1978, Tom Baker's first four seasons as the Doctor were sold to PBS stations across the United States. This time, though, Time-Life was ready to have the Doctor poised for American consumption, by having stage and screen actor Howard da Silva read voiceover recaps of the previous episode and teasers for the next one which would inform the viewer as to what was going on. To accommodate the teasers up to three minutes of original material was cut from each episode. PBS program planners took the show at face value, but it soon achieved cult status. A few commercial stations including WOR-TV in New York City and KVOS-TV in Bellingham, Washington also aired the show for a few years.

=== Return to Canada: TVOntario and CPN ===
In Canada, TVOntario aired the program starting in 1976 with The Three Doctors and continued with the rest of the original series on a weekly basis until 1990 with series airing two to three years behind the BBC. TVO was also available to many viewers in the United States living in states bordering the Great Lakes. In order to fulfill the network's originally strict mandate as an educational broadcaster, TVO's transmissions of the Third Doctor's stories were hosted by Dr. Jim Dator, a futurist teaching to the University of Toronto, while the first three seasons of Fourth Doctor stories were hosted by science fiction writer Judith Merril, who called herself the "UnDoctor". Both hosts would fill out the show's half-hour time slot through introductions and longer extros which would analyze and discuss the episode critically for several minutes often explaining how a story was at variance with scientific concepts, how it related to science fiction genres, or putting the episodes in a socio-political context. Afterward, this broadcast requirement was relaxed and the extra time was used for the network's standard short subject programming such as Eureka!. TVO continued to broadcast Doctor Who until it lost the rights to the programme in 1990.

Meanwhile, in other parts of Canada, Doctor Who became accessible again in the late 1970s as cable television provided many areas with PBS stations piped in from the US, and thus that network's broadcasts of Doctor Who. There were also some local broadcasts of the series outside Ontario: for example, between November 1978 and February 1979 a Saskatchewan-based pay-cable provider, the Co-operative Programming Network (CPN), aired Doctor Who episodes on its Just for Kids channel.

=== 1980s ===
In the mid-1980s, as more stations began to show the existing 1960s episodes, Lionheart (the program's American distributor in the 1980s) dispensed with the older Time-Life tapes containing the Howard Da Silva narrations. Lionheart also offered stations the choice between the standard 25-minute episodes, or a longer version that some stations termed Whovies. These "omnibus editions", or, "movie versions" as they were also known, edited multi-part serials into a single, feature-length film, by cutting out the opening and closing credits, as well as the recap of the cliffhanger, between episodes. (Some edits were clumsy, particularly during Davison-era stories that frequently would have scenes interrupted by partial credit sequences, or feature the sudden appearance of the "electronic scream" sound effect that usually accompanied cliffhangers). This was the most common format used for PBS broadcasts of the series in the 1980s and 1990s. The shortest of these, representing two-episode serials, ran approximately 45 minutes. The longest "Whovie" release, a compilation of the 10-episode The War Games serial, ran for an uninterrupted four hours, though it was more often shown in two two-hour segments; the 14-episode The Trial of a Time Lord was, however, broadcast as four parts, divided, as with the novelisations of this story, into the serial's four major plot lines. This practice carried into the earliest VHS releases in the U.S. and the UK, particularly the first release of The Brain of Morbius which was considerably truncated. It was roundly disliked by many fans and the practice was dropped by the early 1990s.

Success of the program in America was sealed by personal appearances of cast members and production staff at science fiction conventions, and by the national airing on PBS of the 20th anniversary special "The Five Doctors" two days before the BBC. In November 1983, on the weekend after the airing of "The Five Doctors", four actors who played the Doctor (Patrick Troughton, Jon Pertwee, Peter Davison and Tom Baker) and many of those who played the Doctor's companions over the series' first two decades on television appeared at a standing-room-only event in Chicago, the start of a Thanksgiving Day weekend celebration that continues annually (Chicago TARDIS).

1986 Doctor Who USA Tour logo

In 1986, BBC Enterprises organised the Doctor Who USA Tour, a two-year travelling exhibition of props and memorabilia from the program, showcased in a 48-foot trailer decorated with alien landscapes from the show, police box entrances, and a mock-up of the TARDIS interior. Many tour stops included guest appearances from cast members.

The statewide PBS chain New Jersey Network was enthusiastic on the series, scheduling pre-1970 serials as well as being the first to broadcast the new season of the program in 1985. NJN staff member Eric Luskin hosted and produced three documentaries on the series, the latter a "behind the scenes" look at the production of the 25th anniversary story Silver Nemesis.

On 22 November 1987, during a broadcast of the serial Horror of Fang Rock on Chicago, Illinois PBS affiliate WTTW-TV an unknown hacker wearing a Max Headroom mask jammed WTTW's broadcast signal and replaced it with their own audio and video for 88 seconds, concluding with the masked man being hit on his bare butt with a fly swatter. This incident was investigated by the Federal Communications Commission but the culprit's identity was never determined.

Once the series ceased production in 1989, the number of stations carrying Doctor Who naturally dropped, although the program's popularity had been waning in the United States for some years. As most stations were in the practice of purchasing the omnibus "movie versions" of the series rather than the fourteen episodes produced annually in its last four years, stations only received four feature-length stories each January.

Meanwhile, Iowa PBS, the statewide PBS network for Iowa, experienced a surge of interest in Doctor Who, which it broadcast as part of a Friday late-night science fiction marathon alongside Red Dwarf and other British science fiction programs. IPTV holds the distinction of being the only television network, station, or channel in the world to have aired Doctor Who virtually continuously from its debut in 1974 through the present. As of 2014, this amounted to 35 out of 40 years, interrupted only by a five-year hiatus between 1979 and 1984 and a few other breaks lasting only weeks or months.

=== Proposed Nelvana animated series ===
In 1990, following the cancellation of the live action series, the BBC approached the Canadian animation house Nelvana to propose an animated continuation of the show. The cartoon series was to feature an unspecified Doctor incorporating elements of various BBC series Doctors and was not to be oriented to an audience younger than that of the live action series but was intended to be a continuation of the cancelled series but in animated form in order to save costs but with design elements that would promote merchandise sales.

According to Nelvana's Ted Bastien: "We went through a lot of development on it, then we were scripting and storyboarding it and about 4 scripts had been written. It happened really fast".

Concept art was prepared depicting several possible versions of the Doctor modelled on actors such as Peter O'Toole, Jeff Goldblum and Christopher Lloyd with elements of the wardrobes of previous Doctors. and new versions of allies such as K-9 and enemies such as the Daleks and Cybermen. The Master was to be "half-man, half robot with a cybernetic bird accessory and a face modelled after Sean Connery." The show was also to feature female companions from Earth, and space battles which the BBC would not have been able to afford for the live action series.

The series would have been Nelvana's biggest show to date, however, according to Bastien, "it was pulled out from under us" after a British animation studio told the BBC that it could do what Nelvana intended for a much lower price. The project did not proceed further and no pilot was produced.

== Later years ==
=== 1996 television movie ===
National awareness of Doctor Who temporarily increased when the Fox network broadcast a new television movie on 14 May 1996. The movie, a co-production between the BBC and Universal Pictures, received a moderate amount of publicity in American media, including a prominent story in TV Guide. The producers of the movie had hoped that it might serve as a "backdoor pilot" for a new series of Doctor Who, but sub-par ratings in the U.S. prevented this hope from being realised. Many reasons are given for the ratings failure of the TV movie, most of which focus on strong, "sweeps" competition from programs on other channels, including a pivotal episode of the popular sitcom Roseanne. However, it failed not just against its competition on the night, but against other movies broadcast in the same time slot in other weeks. It netted about a 5.5 rating, or about a 9-share. Fox's Tuesday Night Movie slot was generally garnering an 11-share during this period.

At the same time, Fox was also broadcasting the dimension-hopping science fiction series Sliders which was facing its own struggles for renewal following average to middling ratings. Coincidentally, Sliders was owned by Universal Pictures, but when it came to supporting one series or another, the studio predictably backed the one that its wholly owned rather than the one for which it was merely a co-production partner. As a result, when the new Fall schedule was announced, Doctor Who was not on the list. Universal did try to find Doctor Who a home on another broadcast or cable network, but were unsuccessful by the time their relationship expired with the BBC on 31 December 1997.

The TV movie was the first time a Doctor Who adventure was broadcast across the United States at the same time.

The movie was filmed in Vancouver, British Columbia, though it was set in San Francisco, and is to date the only Doctor Who story to be filmed in Canada. The film had its world premiere on CITV-TV in Edmonton, Alberta on 12 May 1996, two days before it aired on The Fox Network in the United States, and fifteen days before airing in the U.K. on the BBC. It is the only Doctor Who story to have had its premiere in Canada.

=== Later syndication of the original series ===
The first Canadian cable network to air Doctor Who was YTV which, from 1989 to the mid-1990s, aired all existing episodes of the series up to Season 26 in a weekday afternoon timeslot. The final two Sylvester McCoy seasons were aired in a separate evening time slot.

The original Hartnell and Troughton-era episodes aired daily on the Canadian science-fiction channel Space (now known as CTV Sci-Fi Channel) following the channel's launch in late 1997; however the black and white episodes did not attract the hoped for viewership and were dropped after a year.

In the 1990s, fewer PBS stations carried Doctor Who, although a few continued to broadcast the series. In the mid-1990s WXEL in West Palm Beach, Florida aired several episodes never before broadcast in America.

By the early 2000s, only a small percentage of the 1980s-era tally of PBS stations still carried the program. In late 2004, the BBC began to stop sending any more episodes to PBS stations and not to renew current contracts as they expired. According to a report by the BBC, this was due to negotiations with commercial American networks to broadcast the new series of Doctor Who. This meant that PBS stations had only their in-house libraries of Doctor Who stories to draw on, and several public television stations stopped broadcasting the programme altogether. By early 2006, only Maryland Public Television and Iowa Public Television still aired the classic series. After it became clear that the Sci Fi Channel would not be purchasing the rights to the classic series, BBC Worldwide offered the show to American broadcast channels again. KBTC & KCKA in Washington State began broadcasting the show again in June 2006.

On 19 December 2006 it was announced that BBC Worldwide and Vuze, Inc., a peer-to-peer technology firm, had a content agreement and that legal copies of several BBC series; including Doctor Who are to be distributed by Azureus' Zudeo software to its American users sometime in the future. At present it is unclear whether the series covered by this agreement is the 'Classic' series, the 2005 series, or both.

The classic series ran on the Canadian digital channel BBC Kids from 2001 until 2010 showing episodes from Jon Pertwee through Sylvester McCoy.

American digital broadcast network Retro Television Network announced that they would begin airing the classic series weeknights from 8-9 PM ET beginning 4 August 2014.

== The new series ==
=== 2005–06: Series 1 ===
In 2005, media reports suggested that the Sci Fi Channel had expressed interest in the picking up the 2005 series revival, but ultimately did not do so that year. The CBC subsequently became the only North American broadcaster carrying the program that year, debuting it on 5 April 2005 to strong ratings. The Canadian broadcasts are formatted slightly differently from the British version, with the addition of commercial breaks, introductions specially recorded by Christopher Eccleston (Billie Piper also recorded an additional one for the Christmas special) and behind-the-scenes footage during the closing credits (mostly taken from Doctor Who Confidential) in order to pad the 45-minute instalments to fill a 60-minute time-slot.

Initially, the Region 1 DVD release announced for 14 February 2006 was limited to Canada, with the American release delayed until a broadcaster could be found. When none seemed forthcoming, BBC Worldwide announced that the American DVD release would be available at the same time as the Canadian one. In the interim, however, Series 1 was picked up by Sci Fi, so while the Canadian DVD release went ahead as scheduled the American DVD release was pushed back to 4 July 2006. Series 1 began airing on Sci Fi on 17 March 2006.

In the Sci Fi Channel’s broadcasts of Series 1, the episodes—apparently sourced from the same master tapes used in Canada—were edited both for time and to accommodate additional commercial breaks. These edits differ somewhat from those made for Canadian broadcasts. With commercials included, each episode runs for a total of one hour. Furthermore, the original “Next Time” trailers were removed and replaced with Sci Fi–produced teasers displayed on the right two-thirds of the screen, while the original credits were compressed to the left side.

The initial Sci Fi Channel broadcasts of Series 1 attained an average Nielsen Rating of 1.3, representing 1.5 million viewers in total. Although these ratings were less than those reached by Sci Fi's original series Battlestar Galactica, Stargate SG-1 and Stargate Atlantis, they reflect a 44% increase in ratings and a 56% increase in viewership over the same timeslot in the second quarter of 2005, as well as increases of 56% and 57% in two key demographics.

=== 2006–08: Series 2-4 ===
"The Christmas Invasion" aired on the Sci Fi Channel on 29 September 2006, along with the first episode of series 2, "New Earth". They were subsequently followed by the rest of season two, which completed airing on 22 December 2006. The second series did not fare quite as well in the ratings, averaging a 1.05 household Nielsen rating.

The third season began airing on the Sci Fi Channel on 6 July 2007. The first two episodes of series 3, "The Runaway Bride" and "Smith and Jones", earned 0.9 Nielsen ratings. Later episode "The Lazarus Experiment" earned a 0.8 rating, but the last two episodes, "The Sound of Drums" and "Last of the Time Lords" both earned 1.0 ratings. The third season averaged 1.3 million viewers.

CBC Television aired the fourth series beginning on 19 September 2008 and repeated the first three series on its digital channel bold. CBC was not given an "in association with..." screen credit during the closing credits of season four episodes, unlike its credit during the first three series. On 12 December 2008, CBC aired the season 4 finale episode "Journey's End" in an extremely edited version that removed approximately 20 minutes of story in order to fit the episode into a standard 60-minute time slot with commercials.

The Sci Fi Channel began airing season four on 18 April 2008. The season four premiere episode, "Voyage of the Damned", earned a 1.1 rating and captured 1.48 million viewers, making it the best-rated season premiere since the pilot and the episode with the most viewers since 2006. The season finale, broadcast in a special 90-minute time slot, earned a 1.0 rating and 1.26 million viewers. Season four as a whole was rated 25% higher than season three in household ratings, and 17% higher in number of viewers.

The cable/satellite network BBC America began re-airing the entire 2005 series in the US on 21 November 2006. In December of the same year it was announced that American PBS station KTEH 54, which services San Jose, California, had acquired the rights to broadcast the 2005 episodes, making it the first public television station to publicise this acquisition of the new series. This news was shortly followed by a press release from CET, another PBS station this time servicing Cincinnati, Ohio, that they too had acquired the Eccleston episodes for broadcast. On 20 February, Outpost Gallifrey reported that another 38 PBS broadcasters, in total 40, have announced that they have acquired the rights to the Eccleston episodes and that they could begin to broadcast them as early as 1 March. On 3 March 2007, KERA-TV, the PBS station in Dallas, Texas, aired the episodes "Rose" and "The End of the World", as well as the episode "Bringing Back the Doctor" of Doctor Who Confidential: Cut Down. In addition, WTTW 11 in Chicago, Illinois has been airing repeats of the new series. Episodes typically air on Saturday evenings at 10:00 pm. Further PBS stations have acquired the rights and begun airing the series at various times.

=== 2008–10: First set of specials and Series 5 ===
The CBC did not broadcast either the 2007 Christmas special, "Voyage of the Damned" or the 2008 follow-up, "The Next Doctor" and did not broadcast the 2009–2010 specials. After airing the 2009–2010 specials, BBC America also acquired the American television rights to the fifth series in 2009. BBC America began airing this season on 17 April 2010.

Series 5 was aired on the Canadian cable channel Space. It also gained the rights to the second series of spin-off series Torchwood (which was dropped by CBC after series 1), and then it aired Torchwood: Children of Earth in July 2009.

Space also began airing Doctor Who specials in 2009. The Next Doctor aired on 14 March 2009 and "Planet of the Dead" aired on 25 July 2009, "The Waters of Mars" aired later in the year and "The End of Time" two-parter aired on 2 January 2010. BBC America aired these two specials on 27 June 2009 and on 26 July 2009. respectively. Space aired "Voyage of the Damned" in April 2010.

BBC America's airing of "The Waters of Mars" on 19 December 2009 earned the channel 1.1 million views, its highest ever prime-time ratings to that date. Part one of "The End of Time" aired on 26 December 2009 with part two airing 2 January 2010.

The Sarah Jane Adventures aired on the Canadian digital channel BBC Kids.

BBC America aired A Christmas Carol on Christmas Day, 2010, making this the first episode of the revived series to be aired in North America on the same day as in the UK.

=== 2011: Series 6 ===
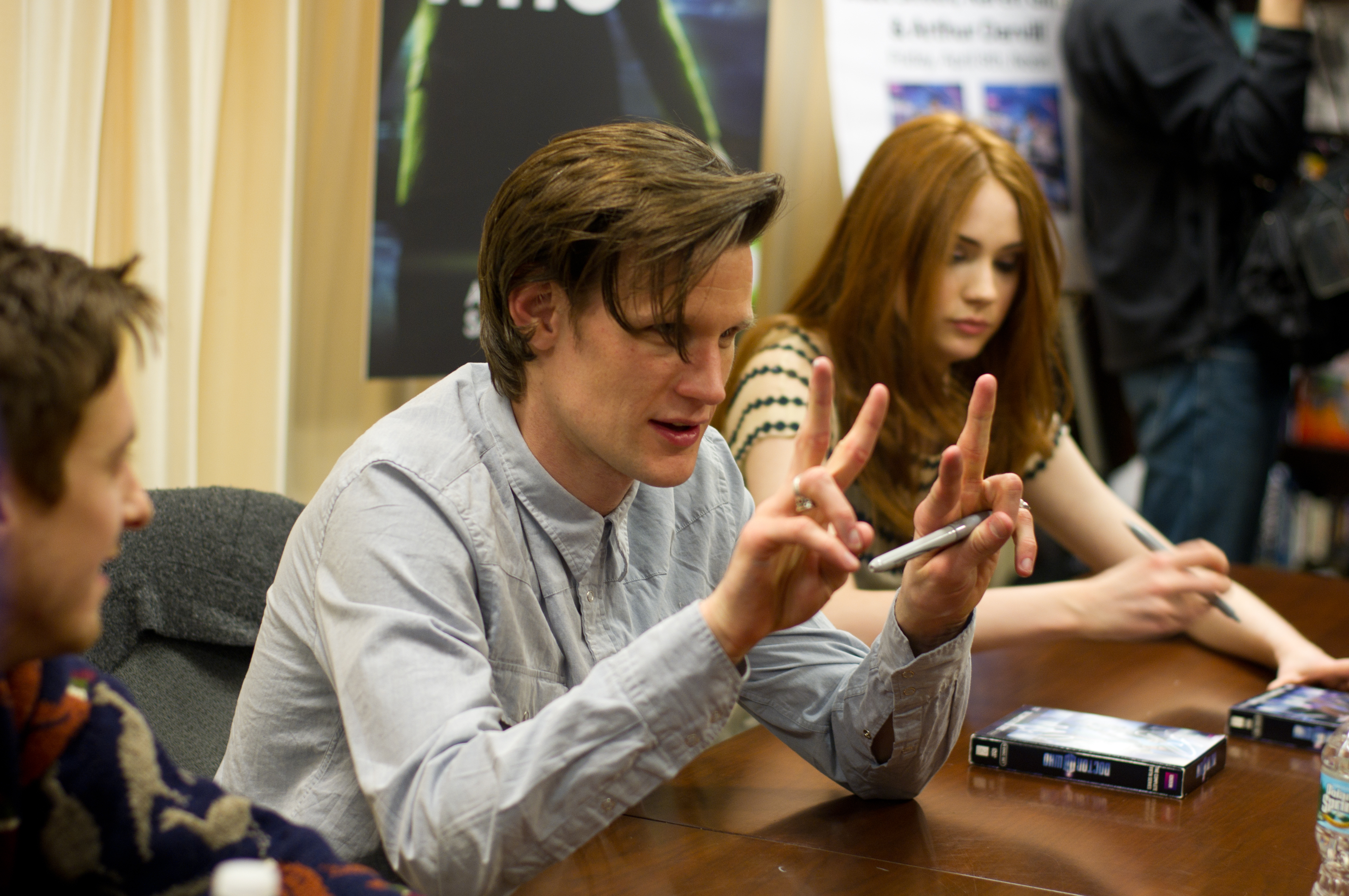
Arthur Darvill, Matt Smith, and Karen Gillan promoted the sixth series in the United States for BBC America.

The first part of the sixth series of Doctor Who was broadcast on BBC America in the U.S. and Space in Canada on the same day as it was in the UK – on Saturday, 23 April – making it the first series since the show's revival in 2005 to be broadcast on the same days in America and Canada as the UK broadcast. The BBC America airings also featured a short prelude, with Amy Pond recapping the events of her first meeting with the Doctor in the series 5 premiere The Eleventh Hour and the rest of the fifth season. Amy then tells the audience of her fantastic adventures with the Eleventh Doctor, travelling through time and space, alongside her boyfriend/fiancé/husband Rory Williams. This recap featured short clips from series 5, except for "The Beast Below", "Amy’s Choice", "Vincent and the Doctor" and "The Lodger". This prologue was dropped after Amy Pond's departure from the show.

=== 2019–2025: HBO Max ===
In 2019, the BBC announced that HBO Max would be the streaming video on demand home for the new series of Doctor Who, in addition to The Office, Top Gear, Luther, and The Honourable Woman.

HBO Max confirmed that the first 13 series of modern-era Doctor Who (2005–2022) left the platform on July 31, 2025. Its spin-off Torchwood exited earlier, on July 26.

=== 2023—2025: Disney+ ===
On 25 October 2022, it was announced that beginning in 2023, future episodes of Doctor Who would no longer air on BBC America and would instead stream on Disney+ in the U.S. and in Canada. Disney did not renew its co-production deal after 2025. In 2026, streaming of the 2005 to 2022 episodes of the show moved to AMC+ in the United States.

== Fandom ==
Initially, the Doctor Who Appreciation Society, the British Doctor Who fan club, had North American chapters but by the early 1980s decided to divest themselves of international components for administrative reasons. As a result, national fan organisations sprang up in North America, including the North American Doctor Who Appreciation Society (which took over from DWAS), the Doctor Who Fan Club of America (which organised regional weekend events with actors headlining the event), the Friends of Doctor Who, and the Canada-based Doctor Who Information Network (which was originally a DWAS chapter). Most of these organisations folded by the 1990s (Friends of Doctor Who lasting to the end of that decade) although the Doctor Who Information Network still continues (celebrating its 33rd anniversary in 2013) and is now the longest-running Doctor Who fan club in North America.

Local Doctor Who fan groups also emerged across the United States. Some disbanded after the series ended production, while others remain active. Among those still in operation are The Whoosier Network (Indiana, celebrating its 29th anniversary in 2013), the North East Wisconsin Friends of The Doctor (NEWFOD), the Prydonians of Prynceton (New Jersey), the Guardians of Gallifrey (Central Florida), Tardis Repairs Inc. (TRI, Southern Florida), Doctor Who New York and the Gallifreyan Embassy of Long Island (New York), the Atlanta Gallifreyans (Georgia), The Earthbound TimeLords (Wauwatosa, Wisconsin), The Milwaukee Time Lords (Milwaukee, Wisconsin), and the Time Meddlers of Los Angeles (California). Other notable fan groups have included the Unearthly Children (Pennsylvania), Friends of the Time Lord and UNIT (Massachusetts), T.A.R.D.I.S. (Arizona), the Legion of Rassilon (Northern California), Emerald City Androgums (Washington), Motor City TARDIS (Michigan), the St. Louis CIA (Missouri), Space City Time Lords and the International House of Daleks (Texas), and the Chronicles of Who (Illinois). Numerous other groups have existed over the years.

Fan support of the 'Classic' series, while not as pronounced as in its heyday in the 1980s, has continued in light of the current revival of the program, with a huge resurgence in mainstream popularity that reached its peak at the height of Matt Smith's tenure as the Doctor. As of 2016, many annual fan-run events occur in America that are exclusively devoted to both 'generations' of the series: the popular Gallifrey One (which has been running annually since 1990) which takes place in February in the Los Angeles area; Chicago TARDIS (begun in 2000) taking place in late November; Hurricane Who (begun in 2009) taking place in Orlando; the Sci Fi Sea Cruise which runs out of different ports annually to destinations such as Mexico and the Caribbean; and such newer events as Long Island Who (New York), Regeneration Who (Maryland), WhoFestDFW (Texas), ConKasterborous (Alabama), Time Eddy (Kansas), Console Room (Minnesota), TimeGate (Georgia) and Anglicon (Washington state). In recent years, many major comic book/media events such as San Diego Comic-Con and other local comic events, plus trade shows such as Wizard World and DragonCon, have featured top-billed Doctor Who actors as guest stars. Other local events, including those promoted by the Meetup.com website, have spawned local fan gatherings, including the Tampa Time Lord Fest in Florida and the "Galliday" themed event at Disneyland in southern California.

Many expressions of fan interest have moved online exclusively. Though the series is a product of the United Kingdom, North American support for the program online has been as fervent and, in some cases, more prominent. Shaun Lyon's Outpost Gallifrey website, statistically the most popular fan-created Doctor Who website in the series' history, originated out of Los Angeles and supported its extremely popular discussion forum community. While Outpost Gallifrey closed during the summer of 2009, it was succeeded by the Gallifrey Base discussion forum, based in Chicago, Illinois. Dr. Siobhan Morgan's "The Doctor Who Homepage," one of the earliest Doctor Who information pages and still a widely regarded portal site, is based in Illinois. Shannon Patrick Sullivan's "Doctor Who: A Brief History of Time (Travel)" and Dominique Boies' "The Doctor Who Guide," both popular Doctor Who reference sites, are based out of Newfoundland and Ontario, Canada, respectively. More recently, the Doctor Who pages of scifi.com, the website of the Sci Fi Channel (which broadcasts the new series episodes) attracts hundreds of fans to its own forum community. Dozens of other popular Doctor Who web pages continue to thrive, and the earlier UseNET newsgroup rec.arts.drwho – a central source of Doctor Who discussion during the 1980s and 90s – still attracts fans.

In the late 2000s, developments in new media facilitated the emergence of numerous global internet radio and podcast broadcasts. A range of popular podcasts from both the United States and Canada caters to Doctor Who fans, the most notable being the Radio Free Skaro podcast, which originated in Edmonton, Alberta, and Vancouver, British Columbia. Numerous other podcasts are also available for direct download on various websites and through platforms such as iTunes.

== See also ==
- Doctor Who DVD releases, including North America (Region 1) releases
- Max Headroom broadcast signal intrusion
