= Azureus =

Azureus may refer to:

- Azure (color), (Latin: Azureus)
- Azureus (software), former name of the BitTorrent client Vuze
- Azureus Inc., former name of the BitTorrent company Vuze, Inc.
- Dendrobates tinctorius 'Azureus', Blue Poison Dart Frog
