= The Stolen Earth =

198a – "The Stolen Earth"
- Doctor Who episode
- Towards the end of the episode, Rose Tyler cradles a dying Doctor after a Dalek shoots him with its gunstick. The climax was written by executive producer Russell T Davies as a pastiche of science fiction romance, and described by David Tennant as "a moment of high emotion for all involved".

Cast
- Doctor: David Tennant – Tenth Doctor
- Companions: Catherine Tate – Donna Noble; Billie Piper – Rose Tyler; Freema Agyeman – Martha Jones; John Barrowman – Jack Harkness; Elisabeth Sladen – Sarah Jane Smith
- Others: Penelope Wilton – Harriet Jones; Gareth David-Lloyd – Ianto Jones; Eve Myles – Gwen Cooper; Thomas Knight – Luke Smith; Bernard Cribbins – Wilfred Mott; Jacqueline King – Sylvia Noble; Adjoa Andoh – Francine Jones; Julian Bleach – Davros; Michael Brandon – General Sanchez; Andrea Harris – Suzanne; Lachele Carl – Trinity Wells; Richard Dawkins – Himself; Paul O'Grady – Himself; Marcus Cunningham – Drunk Man; Jason Mohammad – Newsreader; Paul Kasey – Judoon; Kelly Hunter – Shadow Architect; Amy Beth Hayes – Albino Servant; Gary Milner – Scared Man; Barnaby Edwards, (Note: Miscredited as "Barney Edwards") Nick Pegg, David Hankinson, Anthony Spargo – Dalek Operators; Nicholas Briggs – Dalek Voice; Alexander Armstrong – Voice of Mr Smith

Production
- Directed by: Graeme Harper
- Written by: Russell T Davies
- Produced by: Phil Collinson
- Executive producers: Russell T Davies; Julie Gardner
- Music by: Murray Gold
- Production code: 4.12
- Series: Series 4
- Running time: 1st of 2-part story, 45 minutes
- First broadcast: 28 June 2008

Chronology
← Preceded by "Turn Left"	Followed by → "Journey's End"

"The Stolen Earth" is the twelfth episode of the fourth series and the 750th overall episode (Note: Spilsbury, Tom (24 June 2008). "More Top Tens for Ten". Doctor Who Magazine. No. 397. Royal Tunbridge Wells: Panini Comics. p. 13. (Note: "The Unicorn and the Wasp", the seventh episode of the fourth series, is specified to be the 745th episode.)) of the British science fiction television series Doctor Who. It was first broadcast on BBC One on 28 June 2008. The episode was written by show runner and head writer Russell T Davies and is the first of a two-part crossover story with spin-offs Torchwood and The Sarah Jane Adventures; the concluding episode is "Journey's End", the finale of the fourth series, broadcast on 5 July.

The finale's narrative brings closure to several prominent story arcs created during Davies' tenure as show runner. In the episode, contemporary Earth and 26 other planets are stolen by the Daleks, aided by their megalomaniacal creator Davros and a shattered but precognitive Dalek Caan. As the Doctor and his companion Donna Noble try to find Earth, his previous companions Jack Harkness, Martha Jones, Sarah Jane Smith, and Rose Tyler convene to contact him and mount a defence against the Daleks. In the episode's climax, the Doctor is gunned down by a Dalek and begins to regenerate. It is the Doctor Who appearance of Torchwood characters Gwen Cooper and Ianto Jones; and SJA characters Luke Smith and Mr Smith.

The two-part finale's epic scale and underlying plot was first conceived in early 2007 as the last regular-series story for departing producers Russell T Davies, Julie Gardner, and Phil Collinson: the fourth series finale is the last story produced by Collinson; and Steven Moffat and Piers Wenger replaced Davies and Gardner as showrunner and executive producer respectively in 2010.

"The Stolen Earth" was reviewed positively by both audience and reviewers. The Audience Appreciation Index score was 91: an unprecedented figure for Doctor Who and one of the highest ratings ever given to a television programme. On its original broadcast, it was viewed by 8.78 million viewers and was the second most-watched programme of the week; at the time of broadcast, it was the highest position Doctor Who had ever reached. Critical reaction was overwhelmingly positive. Nicholas Briggs and Julian Bleach were commended for their portrayal of Dalek Caan and Davros respectively; and most aspects of Davies' writing were applauded. Most notably, the twist ending of the episode was universally appreciated. The shock regeneration created an unprecedented level of public interest in the show, which continued until the transmission of "Journey's End".

== Plot ==
The Earth is teleported out of its spatial location. In order to find the Earth, the Doctor contacts the Shadow Proclamation, a universal police force. The Doctor and Donna determine that 27 missing planets—including Earth plus three others they learnt were lost (Note: Three episodes earlier in the series also make reference to "lost" planets: the Adipose breeding planet from "Partners in Crime"; Pyrovillia from "The Fires of Pompeii"; and the Lost Moon of Poosh from "Midnight".)—automatically reorganise into a specific pattern when placed near each other. Donna mentions the disappearance of bees on contemporary Earth; this allows the Doctor to trace the planets to the Medusa Cascade, an inter-universal rift.

A Dalek force, led by their creator Davros and the Supreme Dalek, quickly subjugates Earth. Davros, who was thought to have been killed in the Time War, was saved by Dalek Caan, who entered the conflict after performing an emergency temporal shift. (Note: As depicted in the 2007 episode "Evolution of the Daleks") The power needed to enter the Time War caused Caan to become precognitive at the cost of his sanity.

The Doctor's former companions—who have all encountered the Daleks before (Note: The former companions who appear in this episode had encountered the Daleks in the 1974 serial Death to the Daleks; the 1975 serial Genesis of the Daleks; the 2005 episodes "Dalek", "Bad Wolf", and "The Parting of the Ways"; the 2006 episodes "Army of Ghosts" and "Doomsday", and the 2007 episodes "Daleks in Manhattan" and "Evolution of the Daleks".)—hide in various places in Britain. Martha, Captain Jack and Sarah Jane are contacted by former Prime Minister Harriet Jones through a secret Sub-Wave Network to contact the Doctor's companions in an emergency, although Harriet is unable to reach Rose. They attempt to reach the Doctor by amplifying the Sub-Wave signal; Sarah Jane uses her supercomputer Mr Smith's computing power, and Jack and his Torchwood team members Gwen and Ianto manipulate the Cardiff Rift. The Doctor, and consequently the Daleks, receive the transmission and trace the signal: the Daleks kill Harriet; and the Doctor locates Earth in a "pocket of time".

The Doctor travels into the pocket universe and receives transmitted images of his companions in the Sub-Wave signal. After Davros hijacks the signal and taunts the Doctor about his resurrection and imminent victory, the Doctor breaks communication and attempts to convene with his companions. He lands on the same street on which Rose is searching for him and runs to embrace her, but is suddenly shot by a Dalek. Jack teleports to the street and promptly destroys the Dalek. In the Torchwood hub, Gwen and Ianto attempt to fight off a Dalek that corners them. Sarah Jane sets off in her car to find the Doctor but two Daleks find her and threaten to kill her. Jack helps Rose and Donna carry the Doctor into the TARDIS, where the Doctor begins to regenerate.

== Production ==
=== Early development ===
"The Stolen Earth" and "Journey's End" are the culmination of all four series of Doctor Who since its revival in 2005 and show runner Russell T Davies' work in reviving the show. Davies stated the story arc for the fourth series comprised "an element from every episode—whether it's a person, a phrase, a question, a planet, or a mystery [that] builds up to the grand finale", and the finale "[had] been seeded for a long time, with small but vital references going all the way back to Series One". Several of these thematic motifs are used as major plot points: the significance of disappearance of bees, the Medusa Cascade, and the Shadow Proclamation are explained in the episode. It is the first major crossover between Doctor Who and its spin-off series Torchwood and The Sarah Jane Adventures. Davies compared the crossover's conception to a typical child's imagination of a crossover between the Doctor Who and Star Wars universes:

When you see the story, it'll make so much sense that all these characters are involved. It's simply doing what kids do in their imaginations: they're experts at crossovers and would think of nothing of having their Dalek toys battling Star Wars droids. Why not have all the factions of the Doctor Who universe going into battle together?

— Russell T Davies, Doctor Who Magazine issue 397

The fourth series finale was first planned in early 2006. Its epic scale—including the threat of the destruction of reality and large number of guest stars—was required to compensate for Doctor Who's reduced airtime in 2009 and the imminent departure of producers Davies, Julie Gardner, and Phil Collinson between mid-2008 and early 2010. The episode's story was defined in early 2007, when Davies disseminated his summary of the fourth series to the production team. In his brief, he described the finale—already titled "The Stolen Earth"—as:

The season finale. Earth is transported halfway across the universe as part of a Dalek plot. These episodes feature Martha, Captain Jack, Sarah Jane, Elton, and Rose. Jackie and Mickey? Also, can I have the Torchwood team, just for a couple of days? Plus, a futuristic space station complex where lots of alien races are gathering for a conference. CGI: Bane, Krillitanes, Gelth, Isolus, everything we've got in the computer.

Prosthetics: Judoon, Slitheen, the Graske, the Moxx of Balhoon, Sisters of the Wicker Place Mat, plus a new female alien, a wise old counsellor, head of the space conference. Lots of gunfire and exterminations. And the biggest Dalek spaceship interior ever – more like a Dalek Temple. Christ almighty! The skies over the Earth need to be changed to weird outer space vistas. Also, visible in the sky, a huge Dalek ship interior. The size of a solar system! This will probably explode. Like they do.

And Davros.

— Russell T Davies, Series Four Breakdown

Donna was also planned to make a cameo appearance before Tate agreed to reprise the role for the entire fourth series. Midshipman Alonso Frame (Russell Tovey), who appeared in "Voyage of the Damned", was present as part of the Shadow Proclamation in several drafts of the episode. Piper's appearance was almost cancelled when filming was originally scheduled during her honeymoon in January 2008. Freema Agyeman was similarly contracted to appear in the finale when she accepted the role of Martha Jones in 2006.

Major concepts of the finale were already developed in March 2007. Davies explained the Medusa Cascade—first mentioned in dialogue between the Master and the Doctor in "Last of the Time Lords"—to Radio Times and Doctor Who Magazine journalist Benjamin Cook as "just an area of space" near an inter-universal rift which allowed Rose to return for the fourth series. He sent Cook another email several hours later that explained Dalek Caan's role in the finale and Davros' resurrection from the Time War. The Doctor's regeneration was conceived in two separate parts in mid-2007: Davies outlined the concept of two Doctors in "Journey's End" in late April 2007; and using a regeneration to end the episode was originally conceived on 12 July 2007.

=== Writing ===
Davies' original sketch of his vision of the Shadow Proclamation before he rewrote the scene to be less time- and cost-intensive. His original idea was for the Doctor "to stride in with Donna [...] and walk past every creature we've ever had. Krillitanes swooping. Judoon stomping. Slitheen farting. Maybe even an Isolus fluttering past."

Russell T Davies original sketch of the Daleks attacking Big Ben.

Davies started writing "The Stolen Earth" on 10 December 2007. He had spent the previous day writing Martha's appearance in New York City. He considered destroying the city but decided against it.

Several days before he started writing the episode, he received a call from Bernard Cribbins, who proposed a scene in which his character, Wilfred Mott, would fire a paintball pellet at a Dalek's eyestalk. He proposed it as a reference to the Peter Cushing Dr. Who films that he starred in during the mid-1960s, and thought it would provide comic relief in between heavy exposition. The Dalek's response—evaporating the paintball and replying "My vision is not impaired!"—was added after Cook reminded Davies it was "obligatory" to invert the recurring phrase spoken when a Dalek was blinded ("Vision impaired!"), and remove a weakness the Daleks had exhibited since their first appearance in the 1963–1964 serial The Daleks. Wilfred's reaction to Rose after she blew up the same Dalek—asking her if she wanted to swap weapons—was likewise added by Cribbins by way of an ad-lib during filming.

Davies' first drafts of the Dalek invasion and the Shadow Proclamation were fundamentally different from their broadcast counterparts. Instead of hearing the Daleks' repeated cry of "Exterminate", Captain Jack and Sarah Jane reacted to the sight of Dalek saucers. One saucer would descend towards Whitehall, destroy Big Ben in transit, and assassinate the Prime Minister, Aubrey Fairchild. The Shadow Proclamation—defined in the script as an intergalactic police force that occupied a "huge installation, metal sci-fi towers ranged across a series of linked asteroids, hanging in space, like a Roger Dean painting"—originally featured "every creature [the revival of the show] ever had" and a cameo by Blon Fel-Fotch Pasameer-Day "Margaret Blaine" Slitheen (Annette Badland) as a Jingatheen (a Raxicoricofallapatorian family) toddler. The number of monsters and the Proclamation's bureaucratic nature would anger the Doctor and cause Alonso Frame—now employed as a "Shadow Soldier"—to aid him in filling out paperwork. Frame would be killed by the Daleks later in the story.

A week after he had written the Shadow Proclamation scenes, Davies decided to rewrite the scenes heavily because of monetary and script constraints. Tovey's cameo was replaced with a scene centred on the "Chief Constable" because he was unavailable for filming, much to Davies' disappointment. The Dalek invasion was also rewritten to the version broadcast after he decided a personal assassination of the Prime Minister was uncharacteristically "diplomatic", and recycled the Prime Minister's name for "The Next Doctor" He also expressed doubts about the Shadow Proclamation to Cook; he thought the Chief Constable was "terribly stripped down", but admitted the Shadow Proclamation was a vital element of the plot. He decided to correct the faults in the Chief Constable by renaming her the "Shadow Architect" (Kelly Hunter):

Davies kept the Shadow Proclamation scenes set before the introduction of the Shadow Architect until early February 2008. Davies' submitted script was over the budget afforded for special effects, so he was required to cut the scene, even though Annette Badland had already recorded dialogue for her cameo. The rewritten—and eventually broadcast—scene had the TARDIS "land directly in the Shadow Architect's office" with four Judoon guards.

Davies wrote former Prime Minister Harriet Jones (Penelope Wilton) into the script on 22 December—before Wilton was approached about reprising the role—because Gardner and Collinson wished for the character to have a satisfying and redemptive conclusion; in the dénouement of her previous appearance in "The Christmas Invasion", the character faced a vote of no confidence in Parliament after she ordered Torchwood to shoot down a fleeing Sycorax ship. Harriet Jones' story arc thus formed a tripartite storyline which consisted of an introduction, animosity towards the Doctor, and redemption (albeit at the cost of her life). Davies was aware that Wilton was "very hard to book" and restricted her appearance to one day's filming in one location (Harriet's home) to make negotiations easier; had Wilton declined, Davies planned to replace her with either Donna, Mr Copper (Clive Swift) from "Voyage of the Damned", or Elton from "Love & Monsters". Wilton accepted unconditionally because she "would do anything for ... Davies" and she wished to act in Phil Collinson's last filming block as producer; her first appearance in "Aliens of London" was filmed in the first production block of the first series. Collinson and Davies lamented the character's death: Collinson "[couldn't] bear the thought she's dead" and argued that she escaped death; and Davies generally stated in Doctor Who Magazine issue 397 that "when [significant characters a writer creates] have to die, it's a genuinely emotional time".

Davies' scriptwriting was affected by the development of a head cold and overrunning script constraints; he was annoyed that he had written "dialogue [he had] been dying to write" with a "faint heart" because he would have to cut it. Because he was behind schedule, he was forced to cancel plans to attend Piper's wedding and almost cancelled plans to celebrate the New Year with his boyfriend. These problems affected his first draft of the Doctor's conversation with his companions and encounter with Davros; he dismissed it as "lame shit" which would waste licence-payers' money, and replaced it with a different version hours later. The conversation features all of the Doctor's companions simultaneously talking to the Doctor; Tate, Tennant, and director Graeme Harper made the creative decision to have the Doctor ignore any mention of the Daleks because they thought the Doctor's joviality in the scene would be otherwise inappropriate. He eventually finished the script at 1 am on New Year's Eve. Cook reviewed the last pages of the script and suggested that the episode should air without a trailer; Davies agreed by noting that "[the BBC] never send out preview discs of the last episode" and that any advertisements for "Journey's End" could "just show lots of Daleks and a repeat of "I'm regenerating" [the Doctor's last line in the episode before the regeneration process starts]. The episode was officially submitted on 7 January 2008: the preparation date for "The Stolen Earth" and "Journey's End".

Davies discussed the episode's climax in detail in the show's companion series Doctor Who Confidential. The climax—a Dalek ray shooting the Doctor and his consequent regeneration—was written by Davies as a pastiche of romance fiction. He compared the reunion between Rose and the Doctor to "the biggest romance [the viewer] has ever seen" and joked that seminal films such as Gone with the Wind should have ended with a Dalek shooting the male lead, and intensified the scene's emotional impact through Piper's cameos throughout the fourth series. Tennant described the Doctor's wounding as a "moment of high emotion" and lamented that "[the Doctor] can't have a happy moment, especially with a cliffhanger needing to be written". The episode ended during the regeneration because Davies wanted to create the "biggest, most exciting cliffhanger in Doctor Who", and to differentiate the scene from previous regenerations, which were always completed at the end of serials. He considered its resolution—the regeneration process being halted by the Doctor, who siphoned the excess energy into his severed hand after his injuries were healed—legitimate because the hand was an important plot device in "Journey's End"'s climax. The production team realised the halted regeneration and creation of a new Doctor would create a debate amongst fans about whether one of the Doctor's twelve regenerations were used up. The production team originally declined to comment to avoid the debate; Davies later said that he believed that because the process wasn't completed, the Doctor did not use one of his regenerations. However, the 2013 Christmas special "The Time of the Doctor", written by Davies' successor Steven Moffat, confirmed that this regeneration did indeed count.

=== Casting ===
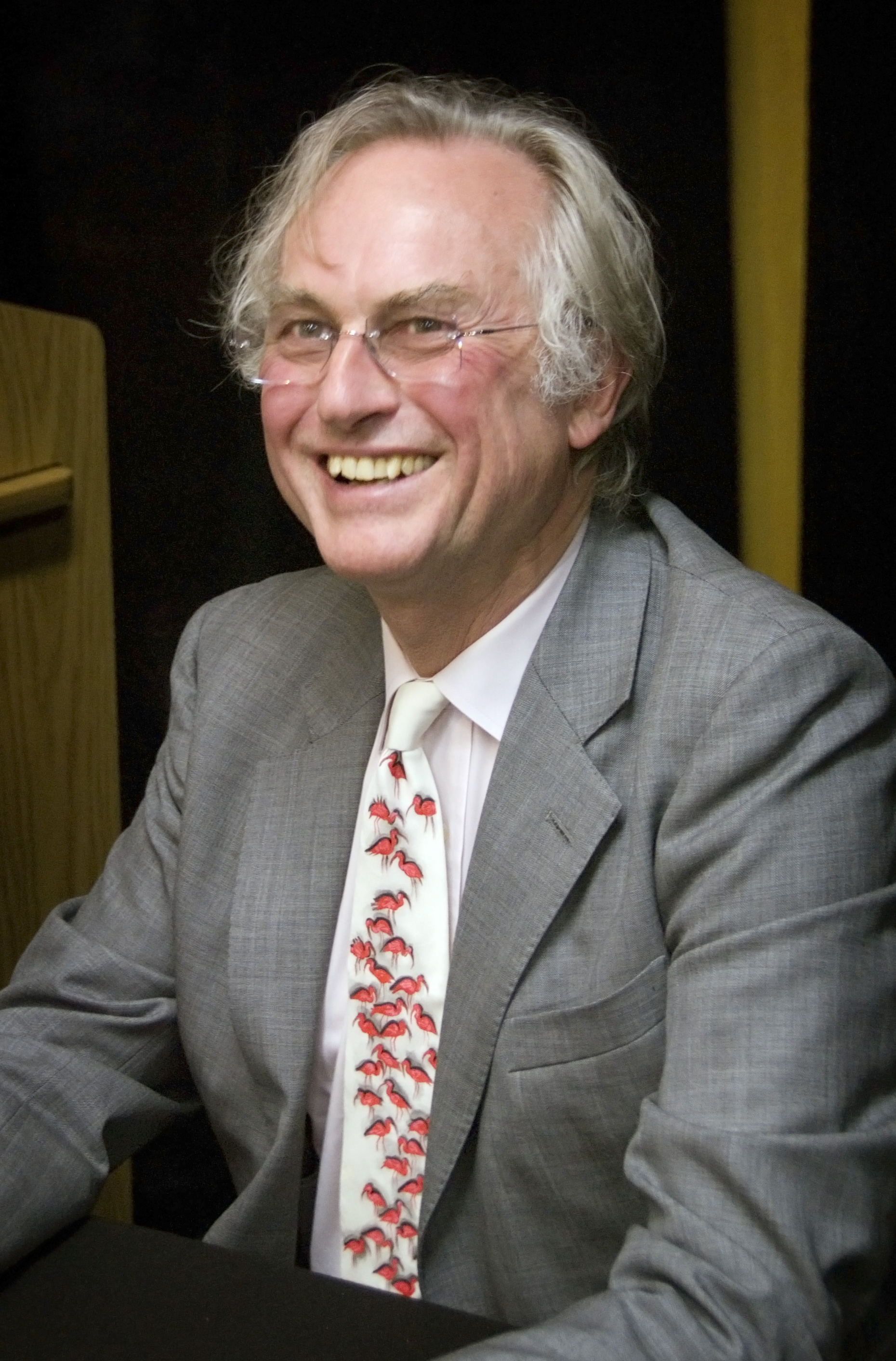
Evolutionary biologist and humanist Richard Dawkins agreed to a cameo appearance because his then-wife, Lalla Ward, portrayed companion and Time Lady Romana in the late 1970s.

The finale expands the usual principal cast size of Doctor Who significantly through its numerous returning characters. As a consequence of the episode's crossover nature, the episode marks the first appearances of Gareth David-Lloyd as Ianto Jones and Tommy Knight as Luke Smith in Doctor Who. Eve Myles, who previously played Gwyneth in "The Unquiet Dead", makes her first appearance as the Torchwood female lead Gwen Cooper. The episode features many returning characters: Billie Piper, Freema Agyeman, Adjoa Andoh, John Barrowman, Nicholas Briggs, Elisabeth Sladen, and Penelope Wilton reprise roles for "The Stolen Earth". In addition to Tennant and Tate, Agyeman, Barrowman, Sladen and Piper are credited in the episode's opening titles, while Wilton, Andoh, Myles and David-Lloyd receive in-episode starring credits.

Evolutionary biologist Richard Dawkins and comedian Paul O'Grady make cameo appearances on Torchwood's television screen; cameos by celebrities such as Davina McCall, Derek Acorah, and Ann Widdecombe had been a part of each penultimate episode since the show's revival. O'Grady was given a cameo after Davies heard that he was a fan of the show; and Dawkins was added to the script by Davies when Cook suggested him to portray the "elderly professor" on a Newsnight-style television programme discussing the new planets in the sky. Dawkins accepted because of his pre-existing association with Doctor Who; his then wife Lalla Ward portrayed the second incarnation of the Time Lady Romana between 1979 and 1981. Gary Milner was cast as the extra "Scared Man" after misreading the callsheet as "Sacred Man" and creating a "priest-like" portrayal of the character. Andrew Bullivant—who portrayed the Milkman in the episode's cold open—was given a role in The Sarah Jane Adventures serial The Temptation of Sarah Jane Smith as a policeman because of his performance in "The Stolen Earth". Michael Brandon later appeared in the audio play Lurkers at Sunlight's Edge. Kelly Hunter made a further appearance as the Shadow Architect in the opening episode of Series 9, "The Magician's Apprentice".

=== Davros ===
A side-by-side comparison of Davros in Destiny of the Daleks (portrayed by David Gooderson) and "The Stolen Earth" (portrayed by Julian Bleach). The visual design of Davros in "The Stolen Earth" is nearly identical to the design for Genesis of the Daleks and Destiny of the Daleks; the only major difference is a robotic right hand.

"The Stolen Earth" is the first appearance of Davros since the 1988 serial Remembrance of the Daleks. Davies postponed Davros' return as he thought that "Davros would dominate the Daleks... like plain robots, instead of the scheming geniuses that they are", and used the previous series to establish the Daleks' individual intelligence. Davros was kept as a contingency plan for several occasions: the character would have appeared in "The Parting of the Ways" if the Emperor Dalek prop was too expensive; and was "even a possibility" to reside in the titular prison in "The Satan Pit". Davies wrote an origin story for Davros to clear up the character's convoluted backstory which was eventually cut because of time constraints.

Davies cast Julian Bleach to portray Davros after his performances in his Olivier Award-winning play Shockheaded Peter and as the Ghostmaker in the Torchwood episode "From Out of the Rain". To keep the return of Davros secret, the character was referred to as "The Enemy" or "Dave [Ross]" among the crew and was kept anonymous on the shooting scripts as much as possible; however, the Radio Times called the secret "one of the worst-kept ... in television history". David Tennant liked Davros' "Hitlerian megalomaniac" attitude and the nostalgic feeling he created—Tennant's first memory of Doctor Who was Davros' debut in Genesis of the Daleks—and described himself as being "absolutely captivated by [the] extraordinary creature". To prepare for his role, Bleach reviewed Genesis of the Daleks, one of his favourite serials, to remind himself of Davros' voice. Bleach described his interpretation of Davros as that of "[a] twisted megalomaniac, [a] mad scientist, [and a] misguided genius" at the same time and described the character as a whole as "a cross between Hitler and Stephen Hawking" whose "nihilistic desires" made the character "extraordinary". Bleach would later use the German leader's oratorical skills and his "dogmatic speeches" as a reference point.

Davies, prosthetics designer Neill Gorton, costume designer Louise Page, and concept artist Peter McKinstry then met to discuss the design of Davros for the episode. They agreed to keep the visual design of Davros faithful to that shown in his debut Genesis of the Daleks; The only major change was to replace the hand destroyed in Revelation of the Daleks with a weaponised robotic version. McKinstry aimed to make Davros "bigger and scarier" by updating the "flimsy" design of the classic series:

We wanted to get away from the slightly flimsy look of the earlier series. So I beefed Davros up, made him more sturdy. I also think that the reinvented Davros is unusual for the new Doctor Who because he is genuinely grotesque. Sometimes we've held back a bit with the ugliness of the monsters. But Davros is a very unpleasant-looking character, which makes his return all the more powerful.

— Peter McKinstry, "Doctor Who: Reinventing Davros"

The team made two minor changes to the design: they removed Davros' microphone and completely redesigned Davros' headpiece. The team felt that the microphone was redundant because Davros did not "speak in a whisper and need something to make him more audible", and originally intended to leave Bleach's voice unaltered in post-production: the decision to treat the voice was not made until late May 2008; and Gorton thought the original headpiece "always seemed particularly weak" for "such a powerful character". After he was informed that the production designer for Genesis of the Daleks wanted the headpiece to resemble a medical brace, Gorton redesigned it to appear to be "screwed directly into [Davros'] head".

Page and Gorton contemporaneously collaborated on Davros' upper body. Page designed the leather tunic—which Gorton thought was "a beautiful piece of costume ... which echoes the classic design"—and Gorton designed the ribcage. Davies explained the use of the leather tunic and the exposed ribcage in Doctor Who Magazine issue 401:

Seriously, Davros is meant to be horrific, and we've had so many withered geniuses in sci-fi lately–like Emperor Palpatine in Star Wars–that I needed something to make everyone sit up and realise that this man is the King of Horror: the original and the best! And he's been through so many physical changes over the years, I wanted to add one of my own. I asked Louise to give him the new jacket buckles, because I wanted it to look like a straitjacket. It just seemed to fit, cos he's so insane!

— Russell T Davies, Doctor Who Magazine issue 401

=== Daleks ===
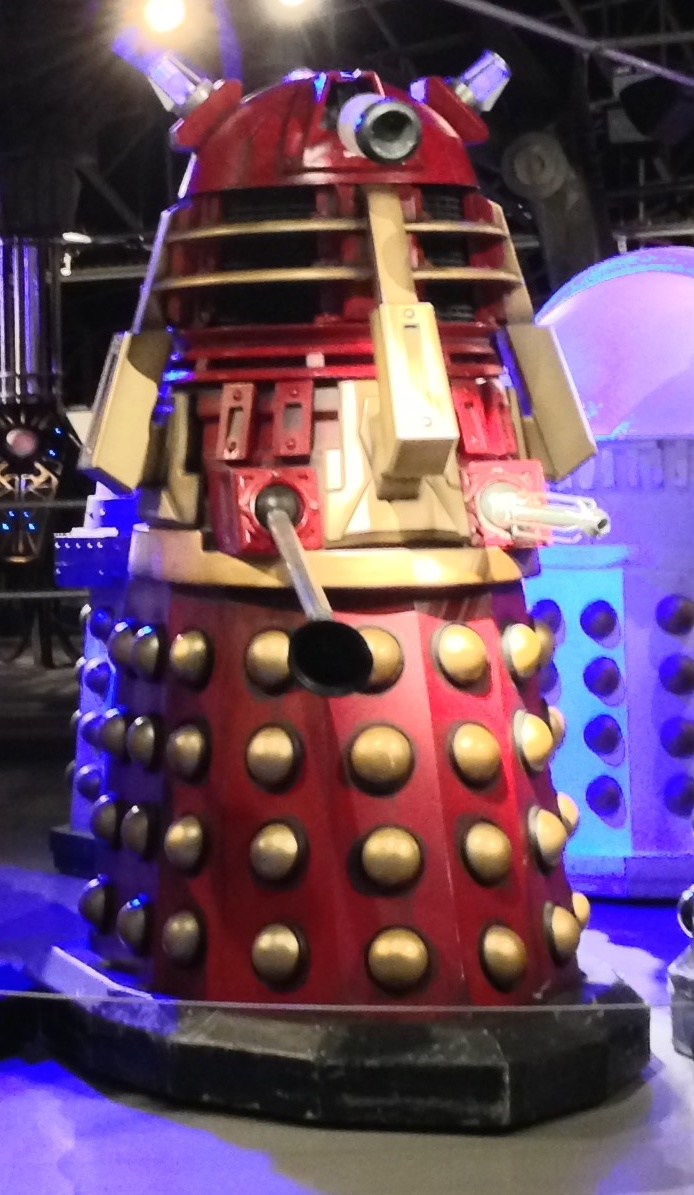
The Supreme Dalek, on display at the Doctor Who Experience.

"The Stolen Earth" is the first appearance of the Daleks since the previous series' "Evolution of the Daleks"; consequently, the prop controllers experienced difficulty re-adapting to their roles. Davies's inclusion of the Daleks as part of the crossover was intended to create a "charged atmosphere" for the protagonists: Jack was killed by the Daleks; Rose and Martha were present at two of their apparent extinctions; and Sarah was present at their creation. The animatronic of the Dalek mutant had to be recreated for the episode, because the previous prop that was used in "Dalek" and "The Parting of the Ways" was irreversibly damaged by water when the latter was filmed. "The Stolen Earth" features two new variants of Daleks: the Supreme Dalek, coloured red as an allusion to the Peter Cushing film Dr. Who and the Daleks; and the partially destroyed Dalek Caan. Caan was described in the shooting script as:

...open, gutted, and melted, its harsh lines now curved and warped... in the middle of the warped, open shell sits a Dalek Mutant, tentacles stirring. This creature is more distorted than ever, its skin bubbled. One blind eye staring out; voice ancient, sing-song, mad.

— Russell T Davies, Shooting script for "The Stolen Earth". Transcribed by Andrew Pixley of Doctor Who Magazine.

Voice actor Nicholas Briggs adopted a different voice for each model: he adopted a grandiose voice for the Supreme Dalek to fit his perception of the character as egotistical; and he adopted a sing-song voice for Caan to reflect the character's insanity as a result of entering the Time War. Briggs justified his interpretation of Caan by explaining that "[Caan] can't tell when he's happy or sad, his emphasis is very strange and he finds things funny when things aren't funny", creating a soothsayer personality with an "almost pure" mind. An expanded theory was published in Briggs' interview with Doctor Who Magazine in July 2008:

My theory on Caan is that being sucked through the Time War and blown out the other end has kind of reverse-wired–or random-wired–his brain, so all his neurons are firing in constantly changing, random, insane ways. That's why he doesn't really know what's funny or serious. He just knows the truth, and it blurts out in this odd, cryptic way. I think he's frozen in a moment of excrutiating [sic] ecstasy. When any emotion surges up inside him, it makes him laugh, whether its appropriate or not.

— Nicholas Briggs, Doctor Who Magazine issue 398

Briggs' portrayal was well-received by the production team: Graeme Harper "loved Caan's giggling" and requested "more ... on every take"; and Davies described Caan as "the creepiest Dalek yet". The finale also introduced minor changes to the Daleks: the characteristic Dalek "plunger" was replaced with a gear mechanism for scenes that featured Davros' guard: the mechanism is used to control Dalek machinery aboard the Dalek flagship Crucible more efficiently; and the Dalek eyestalk exhibits a minuscule twitch in scenes, a characteristic added by Graeme Harper to make them appear cautious and "on-edge".

=== Filming ===
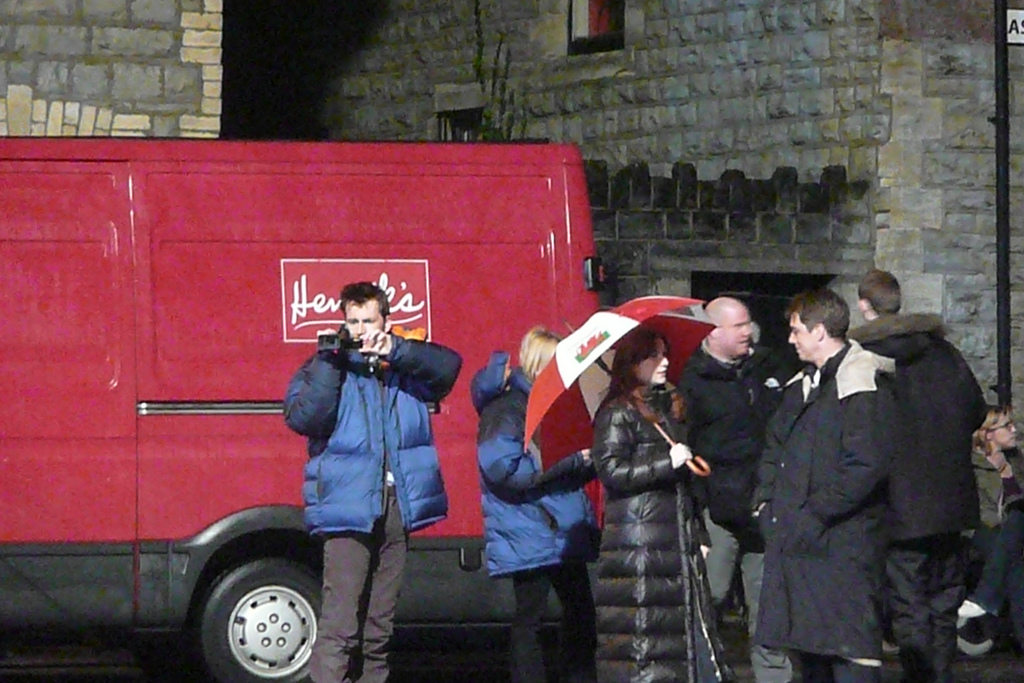
Tennant, Piper, Tate, and Barrowman in a break in filming the episode's climax, in Penarth on 13 March 2008.

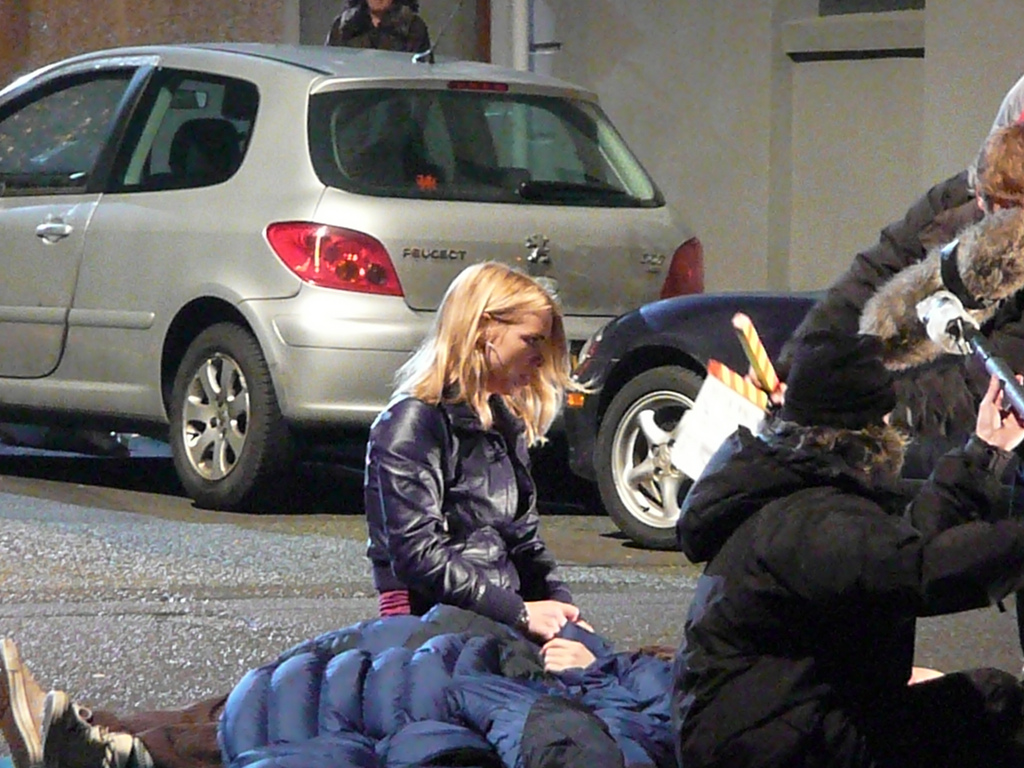
Piper and Tennant filming in Penarth.

"The Stolen Earth" features the first external location shots of the Daleks since the revival of Doctor Who in 2005, and the greatest proportion of filming undertaken at night since the show's revival: apart from the pre-credits sequence set in suburban London, all of the scenes set on Earth were filmed at night.

The two-parter took approximately six weeks in 2008 to film; regular filming began on 18 February 2008 and ended on 29 March. The first scene shot for "The Stolen Earth"—a news report that starred Lachele Carl as Trinity Wells—was filmed on 31 January 2008 in a news studio at BBC Wales' Broadcasting House. (Note: Broadcasting House Cardiff (Trinity Wells' news report): 51°29′53″N 3°13′40″W) The first week of filming took place entirely at the show's studios in Upper Boat, Rhondda Cynon Taf; (Note: BBC Studios, Upper Boat (TARDIS, Torchwood Hub, Dalek Crucible, Sarah Jane Smith's attic): 51°34′33″N 3°18′00″W) most of the scenes set in the Torchwood Hub and the TARDIS—including the regeneration scene—were filmed in the period.

The filming schedule of the second and third week alternated between "The Stolen Earth" and "Journey's End". Three days were allocated to filming for "The Stolen Earth": scenes in Donna's house were filmed on 26 February on Nant Fawr Road, Cyncoed, Cardiff; (Note: Nant Fawr Road, Cyncoed (Noble family home): 51°31′16″N 3°10′20″W) the Crucible Vault set in the Upper Boat Studios was used on 3 March; and scenes at the Shadow Proclamation were filmed at the School of Optometry at Cardiff University (Note: Cardiff School of Optometry (The Shadow Proclamation): 51°29′42″N 3°11′20″W) on 8 March 2008.

Filming for the episode's outdoor scenes began in the afternoon of 11 March. The first outdoor scene filmed was the cold open, on West Mound Crescent in Tonteg. (Note: West Mound Crescent, Tonteg (The Doctor and Donna exit the TARDIS; Rose teleports to Earth shortly after it is moved): 51°34′12″N 3°18′43″W) Two scenes were filmed in Pontypridd on 12 March: exterior scenes of the Noble household took place on Hawthorn Road (Note: Hawthorn Road, Pontypridd (Noble household exterior): 51°34′52″N 3°18′18″W)—rather than the usual location in Cyncoed—before relocating to Market Street in the town centre (Note: Computing Wales, Market Street, Pontypridd (Megabyte City computer store and exterior): 51°36′08″N 3°20′26″W) to film the scenes where Rose encounters members of the public in the middle of a riot. Tennant and Tate meanwhile filmed the trailer for the fourth series because they were not required on location.

The Doctor and Rose's reunion was filmed on 13 March in Penarth town centre, (Note: High Street–Arcot Street–Queen's Road–Paget Road intersection, Penarth (The Doctor and Rose's reunion): 51°26′33″N 3°10′35″W) in front of two hundred people; consequently, the scene was leaked onto the Internet and reported in the next day's edition of The Sun. Graeme Harper insisted that the scene appear "mystical" because the characters' reunion was "the most magical moment" in the entire episode and Ernie Vincze, the Director of Photography for the show, compared the scene's feeling to the 1980s science-fiction film Blade Runner. Exterior filming for the week finished in Brook Street (Note: Brook Street, Riverside, Cardiff (Dalek attack on suburbia): 51°28′46″N 3°11′15″W) and the adjoining Plantagenet Street (Note: Plantagenet Street, Riverside, Cardiff (Wilf shoot a paintball at a Dalek): 51°28′45″N 3°11′11″W) in Riverside, Cardiff, for scenes where Daleks kidnap humans for experimentation and Wilf's attack on a Dalek respectively. Scenes in the UNIT headquarters in Manhattan were filmed on the evenings of 16 March and 19 March: the first night, depicting the Dalek invasion, was filmed in a traffic control centre on Junction 32 of the M4 motorway, (Note: South Wales Traffic Management Centre (UNIT HQ: Dalek invasion): 51°31′33″N 3°14′28″W) with the actual Dalek invasion of the building filmed in six minutes at 5:30am the following morning; and the second night, depicting Martha's escape from UNIT, was filmed in a warehouse in Nantgarw owned by the National Museum Wales. (Note: National Museum Wales Collection Centre, Parc Nantgarw (UNIT HQ: Martha's escape): 51°34′04″N 3°16′40″W) Because of a traffic accident on the first night, the production team were prepared to postpone the shoot if needed.

Penelope Wilton reprised her role as Harriet Jones to film a scene on 18 March, in a cottage in Dinas Powys. (Note: Lower House Barn, Dinas Powys (Harriet Jones' house): 51°27′02″N 3°13′23″W) Filming was stalled because of difficulty transporting the Dalek props into the cottage: specifically, the raised patio doors made it difficult to balance and maneuver the props. The remainder of the fifth week was used to film Dalek-only scenes at Upper Boat Studios, when the Vault set was redressed as the Crucible command deck. Scenes that featured Martha and Sarah in their houses were filmed alternately during the sixth week—the former in the previously regular location of Lower Cwrt-Y-Vil Road in Penarth (Note: Lower Cwrt-Y-Vil Road, Penarth (Jones household): 51°25′55″N 3°10′40″W) and the latter primarily at Upper Boat—ending on 28 March with scenes of Sarah and Luke in their attic. The last exterior scene filmed for the episode was recorded on 25 March in the regular The Sarah Jane Adventures filming location of Clinton Road in Penarth, (Note: Clinton Road (Bannerman Road: exterior shots of Sarah's house; and Sarah is accosted by the Daleks): 51°25′54″N 3°10′44″W) and consisted of external shots of Sarah's house and two Daleks accosting Sarah en route to meeting the Doctor. General filming for the episode—and the two-parter—closed with Dawkins' and O'Grady's cameos: Dawkins was filmed at Upper Boat after shooting finished in the attic set; and O'Grady was filmed on 31 March alongside an episode of The Paul O'Grady Show at The London Studios on the South Bank of the River Thames. (Note: The London Studios, South Bank (The Paul O' Grady Show): 51°30′28″N 0°06′41″W) (Note: Pickup shots for the edited ending of "Journey's End" were filmed alongside filming of "The Next Doctor", in the TARDIS set at Upper Boat Studios on 1 May 2008.)

=== Post-production ===
"The Dark and Endless Dalek Night"
The Dalek leitmotif for the series finale, which is overlaid on scenes of their invasion.

The episode was given to post-production team The Mill after filming concluded. The number of effects in the first draft was almost three times larger than broadcast; consequently, several scenes—most notably, all but one shot of the attack on the Valiant—were cut from the episode. The Mill created two notable effects for "The Stolen Earth": the invasion of New York City, using reconnaissance photos and establishing shots from the filming of "Daleks in Manhattan" to create a 2.5D shot of the city; and the planetary array at the Medusa Cascade, using a fully three-dimensional model.

Murray Gold concurrently composed the score for the episode. In conjunction with new cues composed for the fourth series, Gold used some of his earlier work, such as Rose's and Harriet Jones' leitmotifs, the Ood's "Song of Freedom" from "Planet of the Ood", and the appearance fanfare for Mr Smith, the latter being played in diegesis. Gold discussed the new cues in the release of the fourth series soundtrack:

- "The Doctor's Theme Season [sic] Four" is an orchestral and choral arrangement of the Doctor's leitmotif from the first series performed by the BBC National Orchestra and Chorus of Wales. The original theme was a minimalist solo performed by Melanie Pappenheim. Davies and Collinson described the music as "President Flavia [from "The Five Doctors"] singing out of the Time Vortex" and was intended to be used when "things get too Time Lord-y". An instrumental of the new arrangement was used at the end of "Forest of the Dead", when the Doctor tries to save River Song (Alex Kingston) from death. The rearrangement—and first full prolific use of the cue since "The Parting of the Ways"—specifically represents Rose's return and the four-series story arc's cyclic nature.
- "The Greatest Story Never Told" is a cue used regularly in the second half of the fourth series. The cue evokes the scores of previous episodes to represent the Doctor's "past love".
- "The Rueful Fate of Donna Noble" is a cue that first appeared in "Turn Left". It represents Donna's realisation of her grand destiny and her demises at the end of "Turn Left" and "Journey's End".
- "Davros" is the eponymous character's leitmotif. Gold described Davros as having a "sound motif that underscored him" in addition to "the fingernails ... voice ... [and] face emerging from the shadows". Part of the theme was taken from the score of "Midnight" to represent Dalek Caan's prophecies.
- "The Dark and Endless Dalek Night" is the Dalek leitmotif for the series finale, and features the BBC National Chorus of Wales. Orchestrator and conductor Ben Foster described the track as his "defining moment" of scoring the entire fourth series.
- "A Pressing Need to Save the World" is a rearrangement of a theme first used in the second series of Torchwood; Gold felt it "was appropriate to bring it back" for the series finale.
- "Hanging on the Tablaphone" is a tabla-centric cue that is played over scenes that depicted the Doctor's companions using the subwave network to reach him.

The episode was allocated a fifty-minute slot on BBC One and the only cuts to the episode were minor pieces of dialogue. Post-synchronisation of crowd dialogue took place on 5 June and the episode's final mix took place on 12 June 2008: the same day the episode was officially announced by the BBC.

== Broadcast and reception ==
=== Partial media blackout, broadcast, and ratings ===
The title of the episode was the last of the fourth series to be revealed; in April 2008, when the other twelve episode titles were revealed, "The Stolen Earth"'s was withheld because "it [gave] away too much"; its title was only revealed two weeks before broadcast. Like the second series finale comprising "Army of Ghosts" and "Doomsday", the final scene of "The Stolen Earth" was removed from preview DVDs sent to reviewers and a media blackout was imposed on any plot details from "Journey's End".

Overnight ratings estimated that "The Stolen Earth" was watched by 7.4 million viewers, approximately 38.3% of the total television audience. The final viewing figure was 8.78 million viewers, the second highest figure of the week beginning 23 June 2008; the highest was the UEFA Euro 2008 Final, watched by 8.84 million viewers. Prior to the episode's broadcast, only "Voyage of the Damned" had ranked as high; the record was subsequently broken by "Journey's End" a week later. Consequently, rival channel ITV1 suffered its second worst average audience share in the channel's history: the daily average was 10.2% compared to BBC One's 26.9% average share. The episode received an Appreciation Index score of 91 (considered excellent), the highest rating ever received by the series and one of the highest ratings ever for a terrestrial television programme. Including its viewership on the BBC iPlayer and the following repeats on BBC Three and BBC One, "The Stolen Earth" was eventually viewed by 12.86 million viewers: over two million higher than the series average of 10.59 million.

The episode depicted 07700 900 461 as the Doctor's phone number; the number is reserved by Ofcom for dramatic purposes. After transmission, approximately 2,500 viewers attempted to call the number and received a network message that explained the number was not in service. Ofcom consequently released a statement saying that the calls were free because the number did not exist.

=== Public interest ===
The episode's airing—in particular, its shock regeneration—contributed to a public surge of interest, and speculation about Tennant's replacement: actor Robert Carlyle was the bookmaker's favourite and actors James McAvoy, Jason Statham, Alan Davies, and James Nesbitt were less popular predictions. The increase of public interest peaked in the two days prior to the transmission of "Journey's End": the day before transmission saw the Seventh Doctor's actor Sylvester McCoy, Collinson, Davies, and Agyeman appear on separate daytime television shows; and coverage of the series finale was the top story in BBC News Online's entertainment section several hours before transmission. Davies attributed the amount of interest the episode created—which was greater than he expected—and the success of the new series to the measures made in keeping plot details secret and creating a "live experience":

It's exciting... when you get kids in playground talking about your story, about who's going to live or die, then I consider that a job well done, because that's interactive television, that's what it's all about: it's debate and fun and chat. It's playing a game with the country and I think that's wonderful.

— Russell T Davies, "Struggle to keep Who secret", BBC News Online

=== Critical reception ===
When I was a kid I loved those Marvel Comics team-ups when you'd have Spider-Man teaming up with Captain America and the X-Men. This is the Doctor Who equivalent and it's pant-wettingly exciting. Some of the audience will never have seen Torchwood, some will never have seen The Sarah Jane Adventures, but it doesn't matter. This is a celebration of where Davies has taken Doctor Who and just what has been achieved in four years. Doctor Who is literally a small television industry now, and it's only right and proper that we get to see the spin-off shows brought together under the hospitable roof of the parent show.

— Mark Wright, The Stage

The episode was well received by viewers, in particular, the show's fanbase. In Doctor Who Magazine's 2008 viewer poll, the episode won the awards for "Best Story", "Best Guest Actor" for Julian Bleach, "Best Monster" for the Daleks, "Best Music", and "Best Villain" for Davros; the last was won with a supermajority of the votes cast. The episode was the best-received episode of the fourth series among members of the Doctor Who Forum, with an approval rating of 92.4%. In Doctor Who Magazine's 2009 viewer poll The Mighty 200, rating all of the Doctor Who stories transmitted at the time, the story was rated thirteenth of two hundred, with an approval rating of 84.62%—one hundredth of a percentage point less than the immediately preceding episode, "Turn Left"—and rated as the best story by under-18s and fans since the show's revival in 2005.

The Guardian published three reviews of the episode. Sam Wollaston gave the episode a positive review; he thought it was a "wonderful episode" that "would be hard to top". Wollaston joked in his review about Richard Dawkins's cameo, and compared his anti-theological mannerisms to the Daleks. Gareth McLean described the end of the episode as a "genuine, jaw-dropping, outta-nowhere cliffhanger". He commended the production team for successfully suppressing information about the regeneration in an industry often stifled by leaks. Stephen Brook, of The Guardian's media blog Organgrinder, thought the episode was "unbelievably good" and "genuinely scary and exciting". He theorised about the questionable regeneration: whether it was genuine and, if so, who would portray the next incarnation of the Doctor; and which companion will die in "Journey's End".

The Independent's Thomas Sutcliffe gave the episode a negative review and expressed that the episode was "extermination without inspiration". Before the episode's transmission, he was excited about how Dawkins and O'Grady would appear, and was disappointed when they only appeared when Ianto was channel surfing. Sutcliffe expressed disbelief at the idea that O'Grady would continue to film his talk show, and with a studio audience, in the midst of planetary disaster, but nevertheless praised the cameos. After the cameos, he "began to lose interest" because he did not like the continuity and crossover elements of the episode. He criticised the re-occurrence of clichéd lines "But... that's impossible!", "It can't be!", and "Exterminate!". He closed his review by requesting the producers to "change the record".

Mark Wright of The Stage posed the question: "How on Earth do you review that?". Wright put the episode as "the most bonkers, delicious, audacious, brilliant, silly, exciting and scary piece of Doctor Who seen in the 45-year history of [the] TV series", and described it as "Doctor Who at its most show stopping, entertaining and brilliant best." In his review, Wright explained his love of crossover fiction and commended Davies for turning Doctor Who into a "small television industry". Wright complimented the way the episode was keeping with tradition, specifically aspects such as: "Daleks trundling around spaceships having shouty conversations with each other"; "UNIT [being] as useless as ever at repelling alien marauders", and the visual appearance of Davros. He described Bleach's portrayal as a "halfway house between the original version as played by Michael Wisher and the more exuberant...turn by Terry Molloy". He also thought positively of the final scenes; he commented that "the most flint-hearted must have had a misty eye as Rose found her Time Lord again and they ran towards each other in candy box slow-mo" and he cheered when the "outpouring of romance was brought to an end, as it should be in Doctor Who, by a big Dalek gun".

Ben Rawson-Jones of Digital Spy gave the episode five stars out of five. In his review, he states that "'The Stolen Earth' does a fine job in weaving components from the current series, former companions, and Davros together." He wrote that he admires Graeme Harper's direction of the scene where Sarah and Jack receive the continuous "Exterminate!" transmission from the Daleks and stated that "Harper's work ... is worthy of the big screen in terms of its breathtaking visual elements." He complimented the casting of Michael Brandon as General Sanchez, and expressed hope that Sanchez had survived the Dalek attack because he had the potential to be "the new Brigadier figure that UNIT so desperately needs". Rawson-Jones thought Briggs, as the voice of the Daleks, did a "superb job with Dalek Caan's crazy dialect, stemming from a very inventive and bold move by writer Russell T Davies to make this Dalek go doolally". He praised Bleach's performance as Davros, for his "controlled, sinister vocals" that "wonderfully evoke the brilliant but deranged mindset of the Dalek creator". Upon closing, he commended Davies for being "an expert at delivering jaw-dropping finales that give each season a sense of cohesion and up the stakes to almost unbearable levels", and thought that matching the episode's quality would be a "tough task".

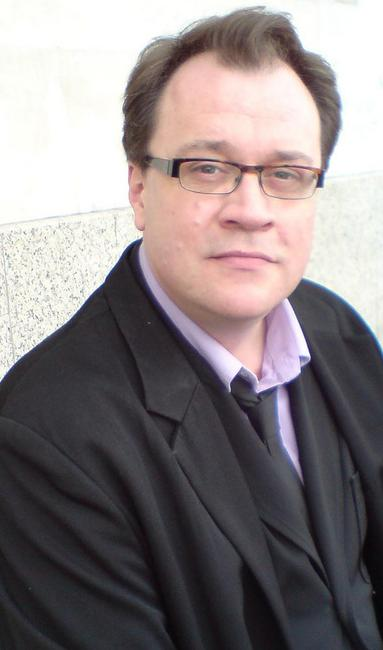
Executive producer and writer Russell T Davies was widely commended for his work on the episode.

Alan Stanley Blair of Airlock Alpha was positive in his review. In his opinion, the episode never failed to deliver and "acts as a tribute to everything Russell T Davies put in place when he resurrected the series in 2005." He described the storyline as "fast-moving, bursting [with] excitement" and said that it contained "everything you would expect to see from an adventure comprising of all companions and a new Dalek empire" and "acts as the ultimate climax to four years of storytelling and will leave you with goose bumps for the full 42 minutes." Blair was impressed with how Torchwood and Doctor Who crossed over when their original target demographics dictated it "should never have happened", and commended scenes that depicted Gwen's concern for her husband Rhys, Ianto watching The Paul O'Grady Show, and Sarah's and Jack's emotional response to the Dalek transmission. Although his review was positive, he did criticise two parts of the episode: the concept of "time-lock[ing]" the Time War was questioned because the Time Lords were annihilated in the conflict; and he complained that the Doctor's phone number was out of service.

Dan Wainwright of The Express & Star in Wolverhampton expressed feelings of denial in response to the episode's ending. He asked: "Surely not even Russell T Davies, who seems obsessed with filling episodes with celebrity cameos and John Barrowman, wouldn't be so maverick as to change his lead actor half way through a season finale?" In his review, Wainwright expressed feelings of amicability and hatred towards Davies for his role in reviving Doctor Who, particularly disliking Davies for romanticising the character, and conversely admiring Davies for making the series popular among children. Catherine Tuckewell, writing for Blogcritics, gave a positive review. She opened by saying "Russell T Davies has again extended the boundaries of most infuriating cliffhangers." She commended the cast for "top notch acting" that brought "a whole new level of emotion to the series", specifically Jack and Sarah's reaction to the Dalek warcry transmission, which "brought tears to her eyes". Tuckewell praised the production team for "the most beautiful [outer space shots] outside the Hubble telescope" and the direction which showed the Daleks "at their fearful best".

Simon Brew of science-fiction blog Den of Geek commented that "If the aim of a really well done Doctor Who cliffhanger is to leaving you screaming ["no"] at the screen and frantically checking the calendar for the next episode, then it's fair to say that Russell T Davies has just managed to tick that box." His review both criticised and praised the episode: he summarised the episode as "bursting with a breathless ambition that papered over its occasional cracks"; but lamented that the plot detail felt "muddled" because of how many plot devices were compressed into the episode. Brew thought the ensemble of companions "separated the great actors from the good": he complimented Sladen's and Cribbins's portrayal of fear; and he criticised UNIT, Torchwood, and the Doctor for uncharacteristically admitting defeat. Brew's opinion of Davros and Caan was positive: he thought that "Julian Bleach nailed [Davros]" and the appearance of Davros was "very reverential" to the classic series and that Caan "[added] an interesting dynamic to the Dalek fight". He closed his review by expressing hope that "Journey's End" didn't end like "Last of the Time Lords" and said:

To say that The Stolen Earth eclipsed the equivalent episode last year would be no understatement whatsoever, and to also note that it's generated an enthusiasm and excitement for next week already would be showing yet more restraint.

— Simon Brew, Den of Geek

Charlie Jane Anders of the science fiction blog io9 called Davies "the gay Michael Bay" and "wished for the first time that Davies would stay on to produce a fifth season" of Doctor Who. She "loved all the silly plot devices and loopy plot twists" such as Project Indigo, the Osterhagen Key, the concept of using "every telephone in England" to call the Doctor, and the fact that Davros was unable to cultivate a Dalek army "without slicing his own torso up". Anders praised Bleach's portrayal of Davros for capturing "the character's mixture of curiosity, manipulativeness and mania better than anyone since [...] Michael Wisher". She also commended the "super-heroics" in the episode, such as Wilf's attack on a Dalek with a paintball gun, Gwen and Ianto's final scene, and the "glowing nobility" of Harriet Jones' sacrifice to help the Doctor:

Even though I was glad we'll never hear anyone say "I know who you are" to her again, I was glad she was able to turn her usual schtick into a moving speech of defiance. It sorta reminded me of the Controller in "Day of the Daleks": "Who knows? I may have helped to exterminate you."

— Charlie Jane Anders, io9

Closing her review, she expressed excitement for "Journey's End", saying the final scene left her with a "feeling like [she had] no clue how it could be resolved, even using crazy RTD logic".

Dave Golder of science-fiction magazine SFX gave the episode four stars out of five. He noted that after two experimental and "edgy" scripts, "The Stolen Earth" used Davies' regular style of "crowd-pleasing script pyrotechnics". He positively reviewed the special effects in the episode, Bleach's acting, the pace of the episode, and the cliffhanger, but criticised the Shadow Proclamation for being "a severe disappointment after all the foreshadowing", and some character moments for being "dropped into the action like little 'emotion bombs'", such as Jack and Sarah's "melodramatic response" to the Dalek transmission. He closed his review by saying "there's no denying [the episode is] all huge fun, like a tipsy romp on a bouncy castle with all the people you've ever loved."

Travis Flickett of IGN gave the episode 7.6/10 ("Enjoyable"). He opened his review by discussing the concept of "fan service":

The idea of "fan service" is always a double edged sword. It's great to see all of the things you may like about a series come together on screen, but it so often works better in theory than in practice. It's like those giant crossovers that comic books do all the time – where every cool character meets every other cool character. While it's interesting (to a degree) that they're sharing a page, everybody ends up getting short-shrift.

— Travis Flickett, IGN

His review focused primarily upon the Daleks. He initially criticised their appearance because of overuse; he discussed their previous appearances in Doctor Who since 2005: a singular enemy in "Dalek"; a Dalek empire against Rose in "The Parting of the Ways"; the Dalek Cult of Skaro against the Cybermen in "Doomsday"; and their appearance in 1930s Manhattan in "Daleks in Manhattan" and "Evolution of the Daleks". He cited Davros and the "year-and-a-half" break as the reason their appearance "sort-of worked"; Davros' appearance "[upped] the stakes", but he criticised the character for "[doing] little to enhance the mythology" and Bleach for a "way over the top" performance. Flickett criticised Rose's isolation from the other companions, but noted that she could defend against the Daleks on her own. He closed his review positively; he said "Whatever the conclusion of this season, Davies run on this series is an enormous achievement."
