= Outpost Gallifrey =

Former Doctor Who Fan Website

- Website type: Fan site
- Owner: Shaun Lyon
- Creator: Shaun Lyon
- Commercial: No
- Registration: Free
- Current status: Closed for all but Gallifrey One convention news. Succeeded by Gallifrey Base.

Outpost Gallifrey was a fan website for the British science fiction television series Doctor Who. It was active as a complete fansite from 1995 until 2007, then existing solely as a portal to the still-active parts of the site, including its news page and forums (rebranded as The Doctor Who News Page and The Doctor Who Forum, but still part of the original site architecture) until 31 July 2009.

== Main site ==
Launched on 11 December 1995, the site was created and administered by Shaun Lyon. The site was based in the United States and was primarily created to promote the annual Los Angeles Doctor Who convention Gallifrey One.

In January 2005, SciFi.com named Outpost Gallifrey its "Sci-Fi Site of the Week", noting its comprehensive coverage of all things Doctor Who. In March 2006, the Los Angeles Times referred to Outpost Gallifrey as "the premier Doctor Who website" in America. In November 2006, an interviewer for bbc.co.uk recommended Outpost Gallifrey as a "terrific fan site", along with the BBC's official Doctor Who website. Its front page claimed that the website received over 25,000 readers every day, rising to up to 50,000 at times of peak interest in the show such as a series premiere or finale.

The site had numerous sections such as an episode guide (giving cast and crew details and story outlines), feature articles and a reviews section. Reader and member submissions were accepted by Lyon.

On 9 October 2006, Lyon announced that he would no longer be updating the news pages because his "heart was no longer in [the constant news collection and editing] anymore." The initial plan was that most of the website would be archived, with only the forum and pages related to the annual Gallifrey One convention continuing to be updated regularly. However, on 2 November 2006, Lyon announced that the site's news page would be returning in a new form, with Lyon as editor-in-chief and a committee of reporters from the US, UK and beyond. The news page was relaunched on 1 December, along with the newly incorporated Web Guide to Doctor Who, a manually maintained listing of Doctor Who websites. Previously this web guide had been a separate site, edited by Paul Harman over ten years.

On 21 January 2007, the website became affiliated with the popular Doctor Who podcast Doctor Who: Podshock.

On 27 August 2007, Lyon announced that the majority of the site would no longer be updated; its most active parts would split into four separate websites, with the rest of the site to be archived. Specifically, the Outpost Gallifrey News Page was relaunched as the Doctor Who News Page (at www.doctorwhonews.com); the Outpost Gallifrey forum became the Doctor Who Forum (at www.doctorwhoforum.com); the address www.gallifreyone.com was retained for the Gallifrey One convention in Los Angeles; and the Web Guide to Doctor Who continued at www.doctorwhowebguide.com. However, it was not until 1 December 2007, that those changes came about when the front page became a single links page to the various new sites, and Outpost Gallifrey was formally closed as a one-stop site. As of 2008, the component sites of the former Outpost Gallifrey were still referred to by the site's old name.

On 2 June 2009, Lyon announced that the site, including the news page and forum, would close completely on 31 July 2009, save as the portal for the Gallifrey One convention. The closure was noted by Charlie Jane Anders of io9, who described Outpost Gallifrey as "the best Doctor Who fansite".

== Discussion forum ==
As of June 2009, the site's discussion forum had over 40,000 registered members, of whom over 15,000 were considered "active". (During the UK broadcasts of the 2008 series of Doctor Who, there were over 31,000 active members). The forum was actively moderated. The forum had close contacts with the production team and writers associated with the series, several of whom had been known to post on the forums. In April 2005, when the news of Christopher Eccleston's departure from Doctor Who broke, discussion on the forum became so heated that Lyon shut the section down for two days; the closure was reported in The Daily Mirror. The British news media regularly used the site to garner examples of fan reactions to Doctor Who.

Doctor Who lead actor David Tennant admitted in a 2005 interview with Doctor Who Magazine that he had visited the Outpost Gallifrey forum shortly after his casting had been announced, to gauge fan reaction. "Well, when it was announced, I admit, I did go on Outpost Gallifrey to have a quick look, because I just couldn't help myself, and everyone was encouraging me to go on and see what the fans were saying about me," he told the magazine.

The fan discussions in the forum were sometimes critical of aspects of Doctor Who production. In a 2007 email recorded in the behind-the-scenes book Doctor Who: The Writer's Tale, executive producer and lead writer Russell T Davies wrote, "I've been browsing Outpost Gallifrey to read how crap I am." Davies also mentioned that writer Helen Raynor and composer Murray Gold had visited the site to see fan reactions to their work, and had experienced a "loss of faith" in their own abilities afterwards.

The forum's popularity and reputation for debate over Doctor Who-related matters were even acknowledged in the programme itself. In 2004, when the first photographs of the new series' TARDIS prop were revealed, there was a vigorous discussion of the prop's historical accuracy on the Outpost Gallifrey Doctor Who discussion forum, an example being that the prop's windows were too big compared to real-life police boxes. In the episode "Blink" one character tells another that the TARDIS is not a real police box and mentions that the windows are the wrong size as evidence. Episode writer Steven Moffat confirmed in 2007 that this line was an in-joke aimed at the Outpost Gallifrey forum.

In early 2008, the Outpost Gallifrey Forum was rebranded as "The Doctor Who Forum". The British press continued to use the forum as a gauge of Doctor Who fan opinion. The forum was closed along with the rest of the site on 31 July 2009; its successor, Gallifrey Base, is run by most of the Forum's support staff. Gallifrey Base officially opened on 13 June 2009.
