= Radio Free Skaro =

Canadian podcast

- Genre: Doctor Who fan podcast
- Format: News, discussion, interview
- Country of origin: Canada

Cast and voices
- Hosted by: Steven Schapansky, Warren Frey, Christopher Burgess

Publication
- Original release: August 2006

Radio Free Skaro (also written as Doctor Who: Radio Free Skaro, or abbreviated as RFS) is a weekly Doctor Who fan podcast, based in Canada. The hosts are Steven Schapansky, Warren Frey, and Christopher Burgess. The podcast began in August 2006, and has been described as the "most popular Doctor Who podcast."

== History and features ==
Schapansky and Frey began the Radio Free Skaro podcast in August 2006; Burgess joined them in 2007. All three are Canadian men who were fans of the series from an early age, before the 2005 reboot. The podcast is listener-supported with a Patreon campaign. A typical episode begins with news from the world of Doctor Who (including casting announcements, air dates, audience statistics, new merchandise, and obituaries), followed by a longer feature, such as an interview, a game, or a commentary on an episode of the television show. Radio Free Skaro also hosts livestreamed post-show commentaries on YouTube, when new episodes of Doctor Who are airing. In December, the podcast creates an audio "Advent calendar" with short daily episodes answering listener questions.

Guests on the podcast have included many of the stars and creators of Doctor Who and its spinoffs. In early 2025, Alberta politician Naheed Nenshi was the show's guest, talking about his lifelong love for the show. A 2024 interview with retired film editor Chris Hayden revealed that Hayden had kept some footage from The War Games when he moved to the United States in 1969. Segments of that interview were included as a special feature when The War Games in Colour was released in 2025.

== Connections in fandom ==
Radio Free Skaro is the official podcast of Gallifrey One, an annual fan convention held in Los Angeles. The podcast's hosts usually chair the opening program of the conference, and conduct interviews with the major convention guests on stage. The podcast marked its 1000th episode at Gallifrey One in February 2025, when the three hosts interviewed Julie Gardner and Steven Moffat.

Radio Free Skaro has ties to many other fan podcasts. In 2009 the podcast featured a "very special episode" to discuss queer representation in Doctor Who spinoff show Torchwood, and invited three guest panelists to better approach the issue. Two of those guests went on to start their own podcast together, Bridging the Rift. The Verity! podcast, which ran from 2013 to 2026, is even more closely connected to Radio Free Skaro, as Schapanky and Burgess are married to two of Verity's hosts, and other Verity! hosts have been guests on Radio Free Skaro. Steven Schapansky has won several Hugo Awards as podcast co-producer for Uncanny Magazine, and has written for Uncanny. Schapansky is also heard on the podcasts Lazy Doctor Who and The Memory Cheats.
