= Vuze, Inc. =

American media-services provider

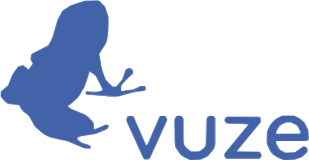
- Type: Private company
- Industry: Video distribution
- Founded: 2006
- Headquarters: 4 W. 4th Avenue, Suite 401; San Mateo, California 94402, USA
- Key people: Gilles BianRosa, Olivier Chalouhi, Chris Thun, Milan Parikh
- Products: Vuze (formerly Azureus)
- Website: www.vuze.com

Vuze, Inc. (formerly Azureus, Inc.) is an American media-services provider founded in 2006 by some of the core developers of the open source BitTorrent client Azureus. Based in San Mateo, California, Vuze provides on-demand content watchable on a computer monitor or a connected TV. It bills itself as "the company behind Azureus".

== History ==
The company claimed to have "distribution deals with 12 television, film and media companies". Vuze has attracted and featured content from global television networks such as the BBC, Showtime, PBS, A&E, or National Geographic Channel, along with production studios and content creators. In December 2006, the BBC announced that hundreds of episodes of its programs will be made available through Vuze (restricted by DRM).

In January 2007, the company launched an Azureus-powered open entertainment platform called Vuze (formerly Zudeo), which is intended to enable content providers to easily distribute their content over the Internet.

In November 2007, Vuze filed a petition with the U.S. Federal Communications Commission to restrict Internet traffic throttling by Internet service providers (ISPs). Vuze filed its “Petition for Rulemaking” to urge the FCC to adopt regulations limiting Internet traffic throttling, a practice by which ISPs block or slow the speed at which Internet content, including video files, can be uploaded or downloaded. The same month, PBS and Vuze launched a content Alliance.

In December 2007, Vuze secured $20 million in its C round of funding. This round was led by New Enterprise Associates (NEA), with existing investors Redpoint Ventures, Greycoft Partners, BV Capital, and Jarl Mohn participating. As a result of the investment, TiVo Co-Founder and former CEO Mike Ramsay joined the Vuze Board of Directors.
