= Gallifrey Base =

- Website type: Fan discussion forum
- Available in: English
- Owners: Steven Hill and Robert Warnock
- Creators: Steven Hill and Jennifer Kelley
- Website: gallifreybase.com
- Commercial: No
- Registration: Required
- Launched: 13 June 2009
- Current status: Active

Gallifrey Base is an Internet forum dedicated to discussion of the British science fiction television series Doctor Who. It has been described as "one of the largest Doctor Who fan forums".

Gallifrey Base was founded as the successor to the forums associated with the Doctor Who fan site Outpost Gallifrey. That site's owner, Shaun Lyon, had decided to close the site and its popular forum. Steven Hill, who had worked as chief administrator for the Outpost Gallifrey forum, decided to create his own site, and many of the staff and readers of the Outpost Gallifrey forums moved to Gallifrey Base. The site is affiliated with the Chicago TARDIS convention.

Like its predecessor, Gallifrey Base is regularly used by the media as a source for opinions and reactions about Doctor Who news from fans and professionals who work on the show.

Several Doctor Who information blogs are affiliated with Gallifrey Base. Although they are not officially part of the site, they share some staff and bear a common trade dress. The Doctor Who News Page, which was formerly affiliated with Outpost Gallifrey before its closure, provides news about Doctor Who and its spin-off series (and has been cited as a source by websites such as TV Squad and io9). The Doctor Who News Page is produced by a team of reporters and editors. This Week in Doctor Who is a compendium of Doctor Who and Doctor Who-related broadcasts worldwide, compiled by Benjamin F Elliott from 1998 until 2011, and now continued by the news page staff. Doctor Who in the Media gathers links to news stories and other Doctor Who-related media coverage.
