= Vuze =

BitTorrent client

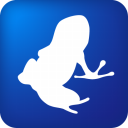

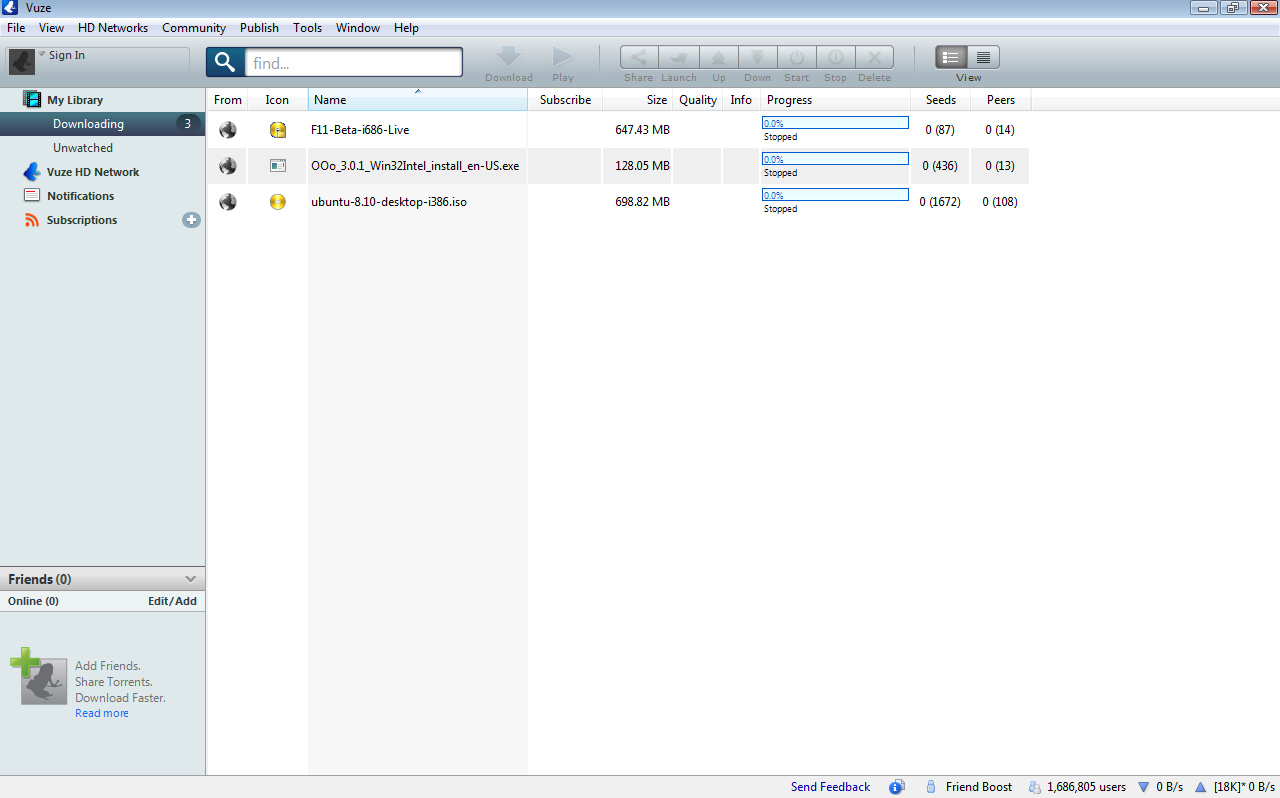
- Developer: Azureus Software
- Release: June 2003; 23 years ago
- Final release: 5.7.6.0 / 2 November 2017; 9 years ago
- Preview release: 5.7.6.1 Beta 1 (November 2, 2017; 9 years ago) [±]
- Written in: Java
- Platform: Java (software platform)
- Successor: BiglyBT
- Size: Source code: 9.7 MB; Linux: 18.9 MB; Windows (x86): 9.1 MB; Windows (x64): 9.0 MB; Android: 5.4 MB; OS X: 10.1 MB
- Available in: 38 languages
- List of languages English, German, French, Dutch, Portuguese, Spanish, Swedish, Chinese (simplified), Chinese (traditional), Polish, Finnish, Danish, Italian, Russian, Norwegian, Bulgarian, Brazilian-Portuguese, Czech, Lithuanian, Slovenian, Turkish, Catalan, Galician, Greek, Hebrew, Serbian, Serbian (latin), Malay, Japanese, Hungarian, Romanian, Thai, Korean, Slovak, Bosnian, Frisian, Macedonian, Georgian
- Type: BitTorrent client
- License: GNU General Public License v2
- Website: www.vuze.com
- Repository: svn.vuze.com/public/

Vuze (previously Azureus) is a BitTorrent client used to transfer files via the BitTorrent protocol. Vuze is written in Java, and uses the Azureus Engine. In addition to downloading data linked to .torrent files, Azureus allows users to view, publish and share original DVD and HD quality video content. Content is presented through channels and categories containing TV shows, music videos, movies, video games, series and others.

Azureus was first released in June 2003 at SourceForge.net, mostly to experiment with the Standard Widget Toolkit from Eclipse. It later became one of the most popular BitTorrent clients. The Azureus software was released under the GNU General Public License, and remains as a free software application. It was among the most popular BitTorrent clients. However, the Vuze software added in more recent versions is proprietary and users are required to accept these more restrictive license terms.

== Features ==
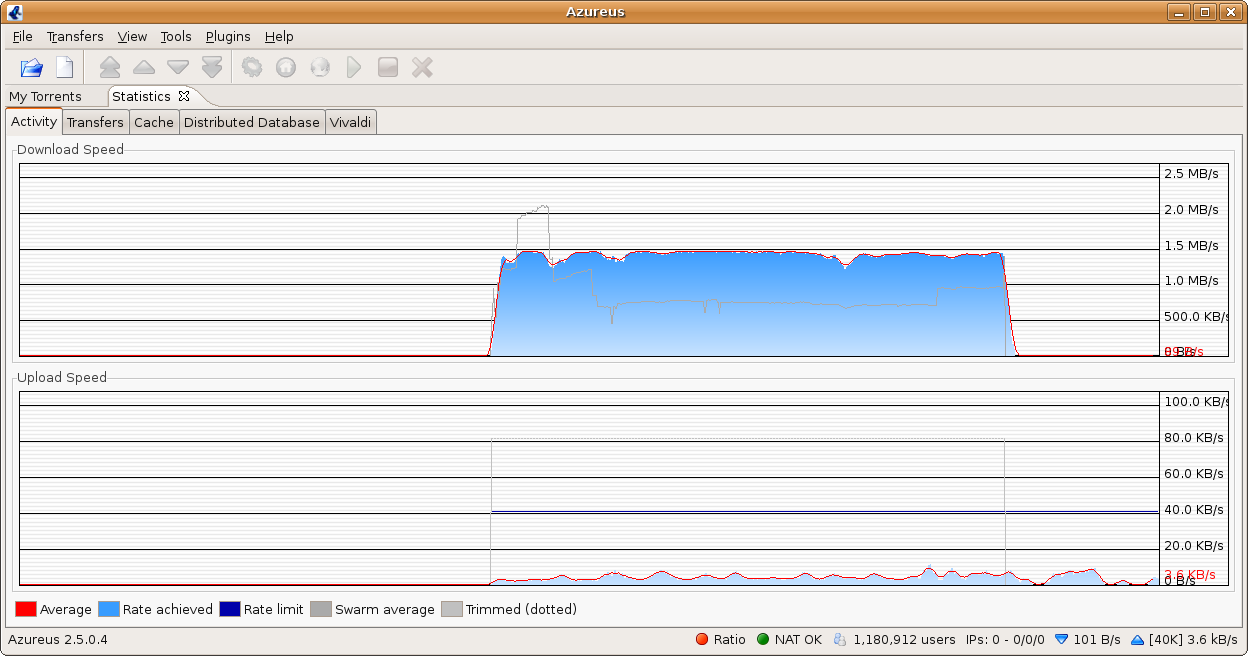
Vuze (classic UI) statistics page

=== Bridging between I2P and the clearnet ===
Vuze is one of few BitTorrent clients that make clearnet torrents available on I2P and vice versa. It has a plugin that connects to the I2P network. If the user adds a torrent from I2P, it will be seeded on both I2P and the clearnet, and if a user adds a torrent from the clearnet, it will be seeded on both the clearnet and I2P. For this reason, torrents previously published only on I2P are made available to the entire Internet, and users of I2P can download any torrent on the Internet while maintaining the anonymity of I2P. As of 2023 BiglyBT added support for using the I2P HTTP(S) proxy for eepsite URLs. By default BiglyBT is configured to use StormyCloud Inc I2P Outproxy.

== History ==
=== Azureus ===
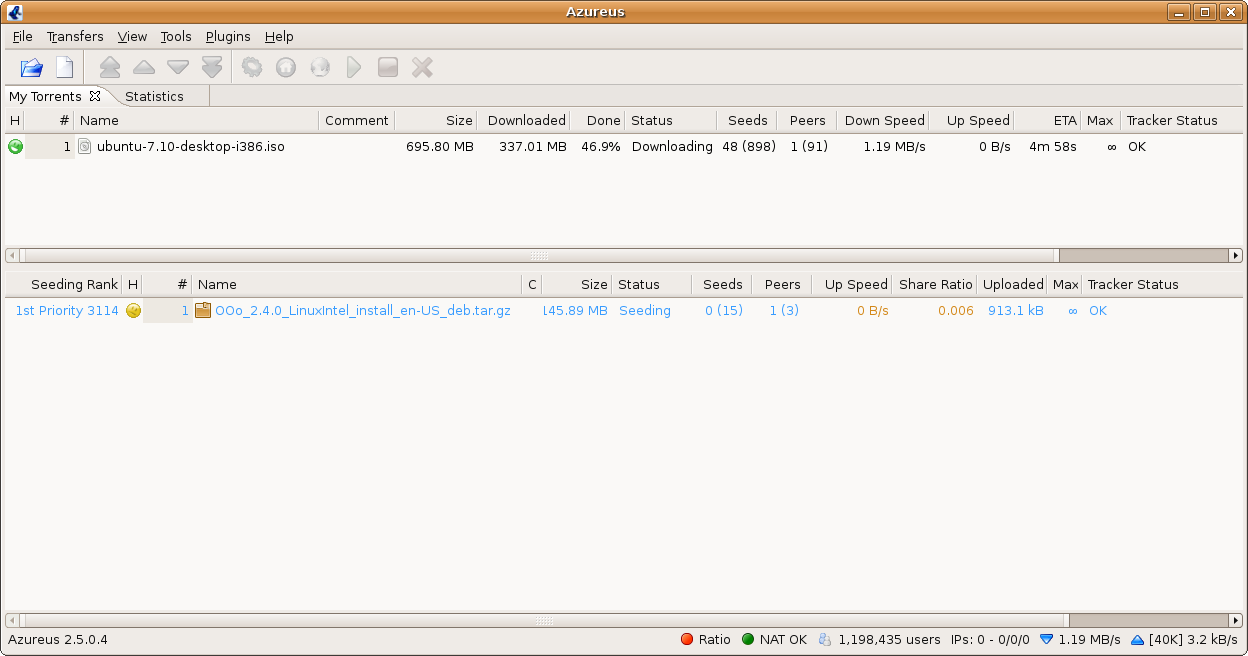
Azureus

Azureus was first released in June 2003 at SourceForge.net. The blue poison dart frog (Dendrobates azureus) was chosen as the logo and name of the brand by co-creator Tyler Pitchford. This choice was due to Latin names of poison dart frogs being used as codenames for his development projects.

=== Vuze ===
In 2006 Vuze was released as an attempt to transform the client into a "social" client by a group of the original developers forming Azureus Inc., shortly to be renamed Vuze, Inc. A Vuze-free version of Azureus was released along with Vuze during the beta period. The releases used version numbers 3.0, while the Vuze-free versions continued with the 2.5 release numbers. In addition, some developers voiced opposition to the idea of completely transforming the client. Starting with an unknown version, Vuze was coupled with Azureus. Soon after, "NoVuze" modified versions were released on The Pirate Bay, and as of September 15, 2008, are available for versions up to 3.1.1.0. On June 16, 2008, the developers of Azureus/Vuze decided to stop releasing versions named Azureus, and complete the name change with the release of version 3.1. The client engine however, remains unchanged as Azureus.

=== License change ===
Up to version 2.5.0.4, Azureus was distributed under the GNU General Public License (GPL); beginning with the version 3 distribution, the license presented upon installation changed. While it still states that the "Azureus Application" is available under the GPL, completing installation requires the user to agree to the terms of the "Vuze Platform," which include restrictions on use, reverse-engineering, and sublicensing. As with many similar licenses, the Azureus licence includes a prohibition on use of the software by people "under the age of 18." Allegedly, the TOS only applies to the website, vuze.com, and not the software, however the actual TOS include the application as part of the platforms.

=== Acquisition by Spigot Inc ===
Vuze was acquired by Spigot Inc in December 2010.

=== Development hiatus and fork ===
Maintenance and development of Vuze ground to a halt in early 2017, with no new releases or commits being made since April, featured content becoming inaccessible, and users reporting outdated antivirus definitions. The two main developers left the project and focused their efforts on a fork called BiglyBT, which removed Vuze's premium and proprietary features such as DVD burning, gaming promotions, the video-sharing content network, and the installer's advertisements.

== Criticism ==
Vuze is categorized as adware by Softpedia, due to its inclusion of a Vuze Toolbar for web browsers. Vuze changes or offers to change home page and search and to install a promotional component not necessary for the program to function. However, all adware can be declined by using a custom installation. In February 2010, What.CD and Waffles.fm, two large music sharing sites at the time, decided to ban the use of Vuze.

However, Vuze cites its Softpedia Editor's pick award, having received an editor score of 4 out of 5 from two reviews: One on 23 November 2005 and another on 7 February 2012.

Vuze includes built-in support for Tor, an anonymity network. The onion routers are run by volunteers using their own bandwidth at their own cost. Due to the high bandwidth usage caused by the BitTorrent protocol, it is considered impolite and inappropriate by Tor community members to use the Tor network for BitTorrent transfers. By default, the Tor exit policy blocks the standard BitTorrent ports.

It also includes I2P support via an official plugin. In contrast to Tor, I2P is built for P2P traffic and encourages its use.

== See also ==
- Comparison of BitTorrent clients
