= Takashi Nagase =

Japanese Army officer

- 永瀬 隆
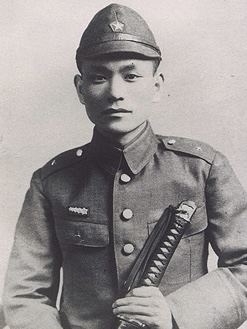
- Born: February 20, 1918; Kurashiki, Okayama Prefecture, Japan
- Died: June 21, 2011 (aged 93); Kurashiki, Okayama Prefecture, Japan
- Education: Aoyama Gakuin University
- Military career
- Allegiance: Empire of Japan
- Branch: Imperial Japanese Army
- Rank: Officer
- Unit: Kempeitai
- Conflicts: World War II; Burma campaign
- Other work: Military Interpreter; Philanthropist; Buddhist priest

Takashi Nagase (永瀬 隆, Nagase Takashi; February 20, 1918 – June 21, 2011) was a Japanese military interpreter during World War II. He worked for the Kempeitai (military secret police) at the construction of the Burma Railway in Thailand, and spent most of his later life as an activist for post-war reconciliation and against Japanese militarism. He made over a hundred visits to Thailand, and from the 1970s, arranged several meetings between former Allied prisoners of wars and their Japanese captors, in efforts to promote peace and understanding. In 1993, he met and reconciled with British former POW Eric Lomax—in whose torture sessions Nagase had been involved—an encounter retold in Lomax's 1995 autobiography The Railway Man.

== Early life and military service ==
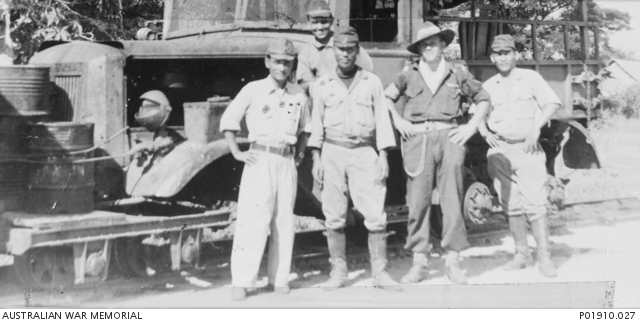
Nagase (on the far left) in October 1945

Nagase was born in 1918 in Kurashiki, Empire of Japan (present-day, Japan) and learned English at Aoyama Gakuin University. He joined the Imperial Japanese Army during World War II, and became an interpreter for the Kempeitai at the construction of the Burma Railway, known for its brutal conditions leading to the deaths of over 12,000 Allied prisoners of war and 90,000 Asian labourers or romusha. Nagase was involved in the interrogation and torture of many Allied POWs. Following Japan's surrender, Nagase spent seven weeks working for the Allied War Graves Commission as a volunteer, helping recover bodies for proper burial. After returning to Japan, he founded an English-language school in Kurashiki.

== After the war ==
Nagase was first introduced to the British public in the documentary made by ex-POW John Coast about the realities of life on the Thai-Burma Railway, which was first broadcast in the UK on BBC2 on 15 March 1969. It was repeated on BBC1 on 4 August 1969 and again on Boxing Day 1974. The documentary was an early colour broadcast and part of the series One Pair of Eyes. Return to the River Kwai featured interviews with Nagase and two other Japanese soldiers who had worked with the prisoners on the railway. Nagase acted as both interpreter for the two other soldiers and interviewee. A transcript of the documentary and Nagase's responses to Coast's questions about the treatment of the POWs and some of the Japanese accused of war crimes after the war (plus some of Nagase's responses that did not make it into the final edit of the documentary) can be found in the new 2014 edition of Coast's book Railroad of Death originally published in 1946.

Nagase was also noted for his reconciliation with former British Army officer Eric Lomax, whom he interrogated and tortured at a Japanese prisoner-of-war camp in 1942. Lomax then went on to discuss his reconciliation and eventual friendship with Nagase in his autobiography, The Railway Man. The book chronicled his experience before, during, and after the Second World War. It won the 1996 NCR Book Award and the J. R. Ackerley Prize for Autobiography.

Nagase also wrote a book on his own experiences during and after the war entitled Crosses and Tigers, and financed a Buddhist temple at the bridge to atone for his actions during the war. The reconciliation between the two men was filmed as a documentary Enemy, My Friend? (1995), directed by Mike Finlason.

After the end of the Second World War, Takashi Nagase became a devout Buddhist priest and tried to atone for the Japanese army's treatment of prisoners of war. He made more than 100 missions of atonement to the River Kwai in Thailand.

He died in 2011 in Kurashiki.

== In television and films ==
Nagase is portrayed by Randall Duk Kim in the 1996 BBC TV film Prisoners in Time, based on the story of Eric Lomax, who is played by John Hurt, with Rowena Cooper as his wife, Patti.

In the 2001 film To End All Wars, based on the autobiography of Ernest Gordon, Nagase is portrayed by Yugo Saso, with Ciarán McMenamin as Gordon.

In the 2013 film The Railway Man, based on Lomax's autobiography, Nagase is portrayed by Tanroh Ishida and Hiroyuki Sanada, with Colin Firth and Jeremy Irvine as Lomax and Nicole Kidman as Patti.

== Publications ==
- Nagase, Takashi (1990). Crosses and tigers. Translated from the Japanese by T. Nagase and M. Watase. Bangkok: Allied Printers.
- Nagase, Takashi (2010). Goddard, Gill (ed.). Crosses and tigers, and : The double-edged dagger : the Cowra incident of 1944 (2 ed.). Sheffield: Paulownia Press. ISBN 9780955558238.
