= Broadchurch series 3 =

Season of television series

Broadchurch
- Series 3
- Cover DVD release
- No. of episodes: 8

Release
- Original network: ITV
- Original release: 27 February – 17 April 2017

Series chronology
- ← Previous; Series 2

The third and final series of the British crime drama Broadchurch began airing on the ITV broadcast network in the United Kingdom on 27 February 2017 and is set three years after the events of series two. The eight-episode series follows the rape of a local woman in the fictional, close-knit coastal town of Broadchurch in Dorset, England. The return features series stars David Tennant and Olivia Colman and many other actors from the first two series.

== Production ==
=== Production approval ===
While conceiving and writing the first series of Broadchurch in 2012, Chris Chibnall designed his story to be told as a trilogy but the first series had to be self-contained in case the show did not do well in the ratings and a second series was not commissioned. When he pitched series one to ITV, in the autumn of 2012, he pitched series two and three at the same time.

On 1 December 2014, a number of media outlets reported that ITV had commissioned a third series of Broadchurch.

On 23 February 2015, ITV confirmed that Broadchurch, as well as David Tennant and Olivia Colman, would return for a third series, repeating the use of "Broadchurch will return" after the closing credits. Jane Featherstone and Chris Chibnall continued as executive producers of the programme in series three, with Dan Winch replacing Richard Stokes as producer for the final series. Chibnall is the lead writer.

=== Writing ===
Filming for the third series began in May 2016 and broadcast started on 27 February 2017. The final series follows Miller and Hardy as they investigate a serious sexual assault. Creator Chris Chibnall said, "We have one last story to tell, featuring both familiar faces and new characters. I hope it's a compelling and emotional farewell to a world and show that means so much to me." The Shores, Dorset's Sexual Assault Referral Centre (SARC), and the Dorset Rape Crisis charity, along with various police advisers, assisted Chibnall throughout writing the scripts.

=== Casting ===
David Tennant and Olivia Colman were the first two cast members to be confirmed to return for the third and final series. On 12 April 2016, ITV officially announced the casting for the third and final series, with Jodie Whittaker, Andrew Buchan, Arthur Darvill, Carolyn Pickles and Adam Wilson returning to play their respective roles as Beth Latimer, Mark Latimer, Rev. Paul Coates, Maggie Radcliffe and Tom Miller. Joe Sims confirmed his return as Nigel Carter via Twitter. Charlotte Rampling confirmed she would not return as Jocelyn Knight QC, with her character's absence explained in the second episode as being due to her being involved in a big trial in London.

Actors new to Broadchurch include Mark Bazeley, Georgina Campbell, Julie Hesmondhalgh, Charlie Higson, Sarah Parish, Lenny Henry, Roy Hudd, Sunetra Sarker, Sebastian Armesto, Becky Brunning, Jim Howick, Chris Mason and Deon-Lee Williams.

== Cast ==
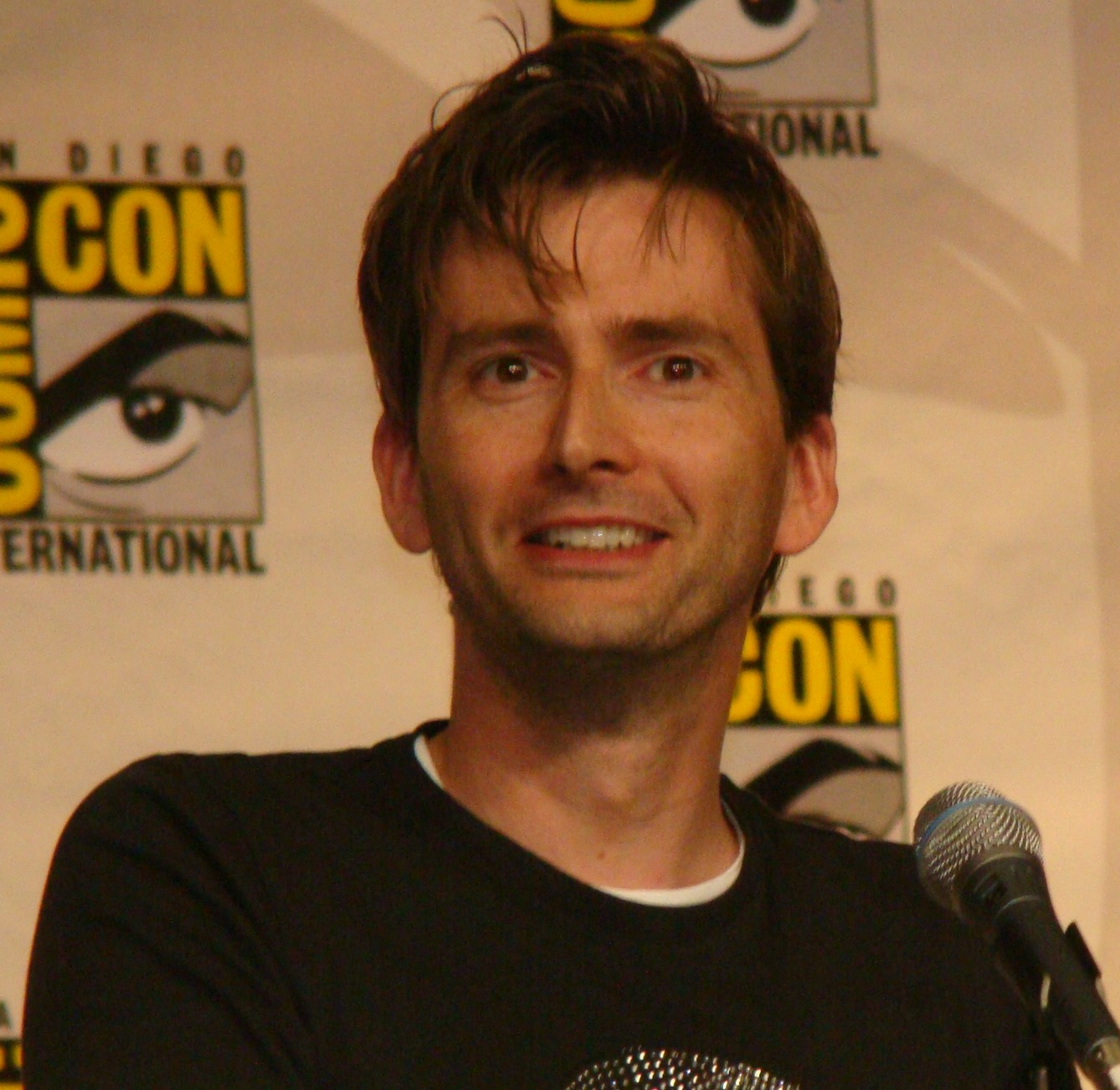
David Tennant

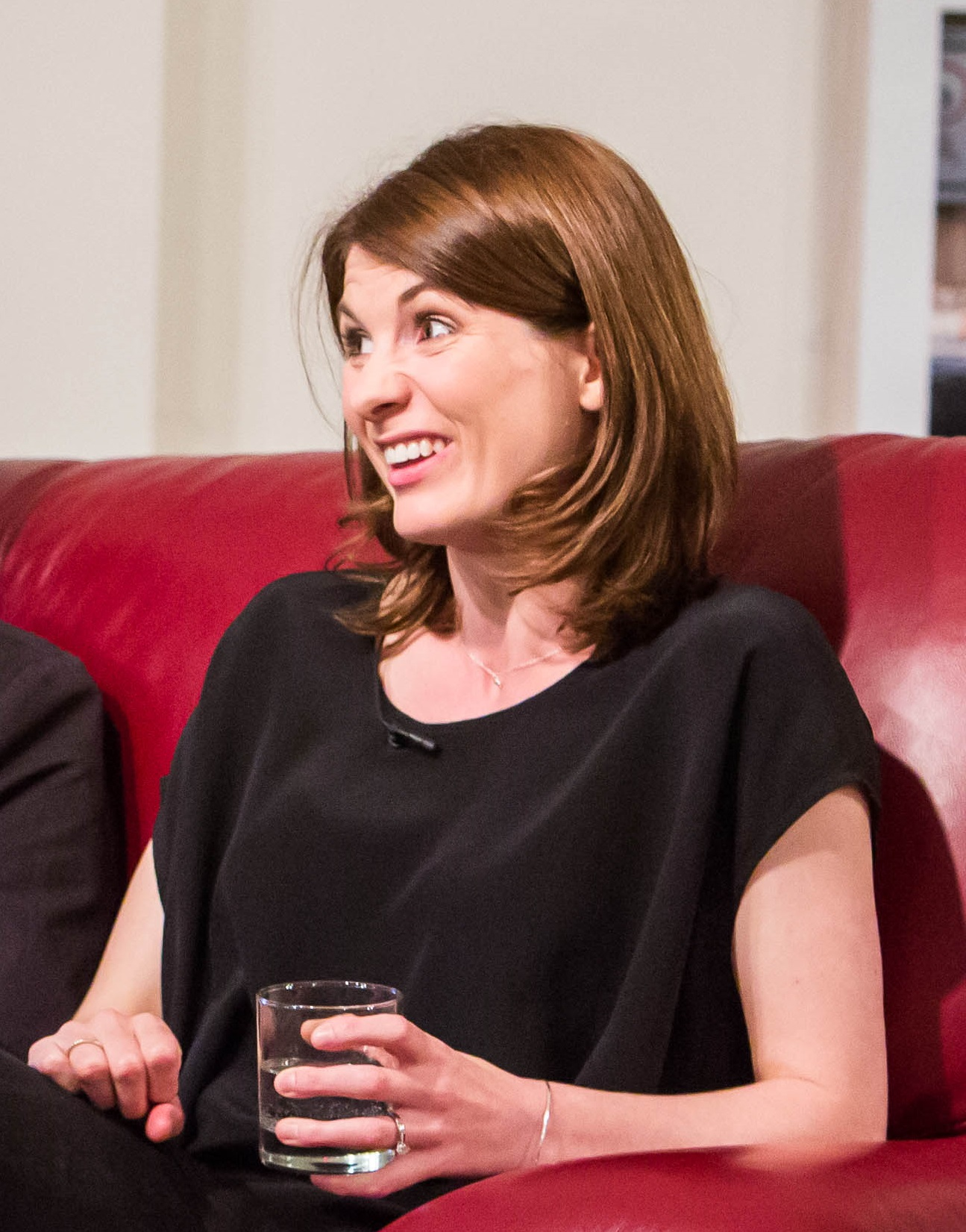
Jodie Whittaker

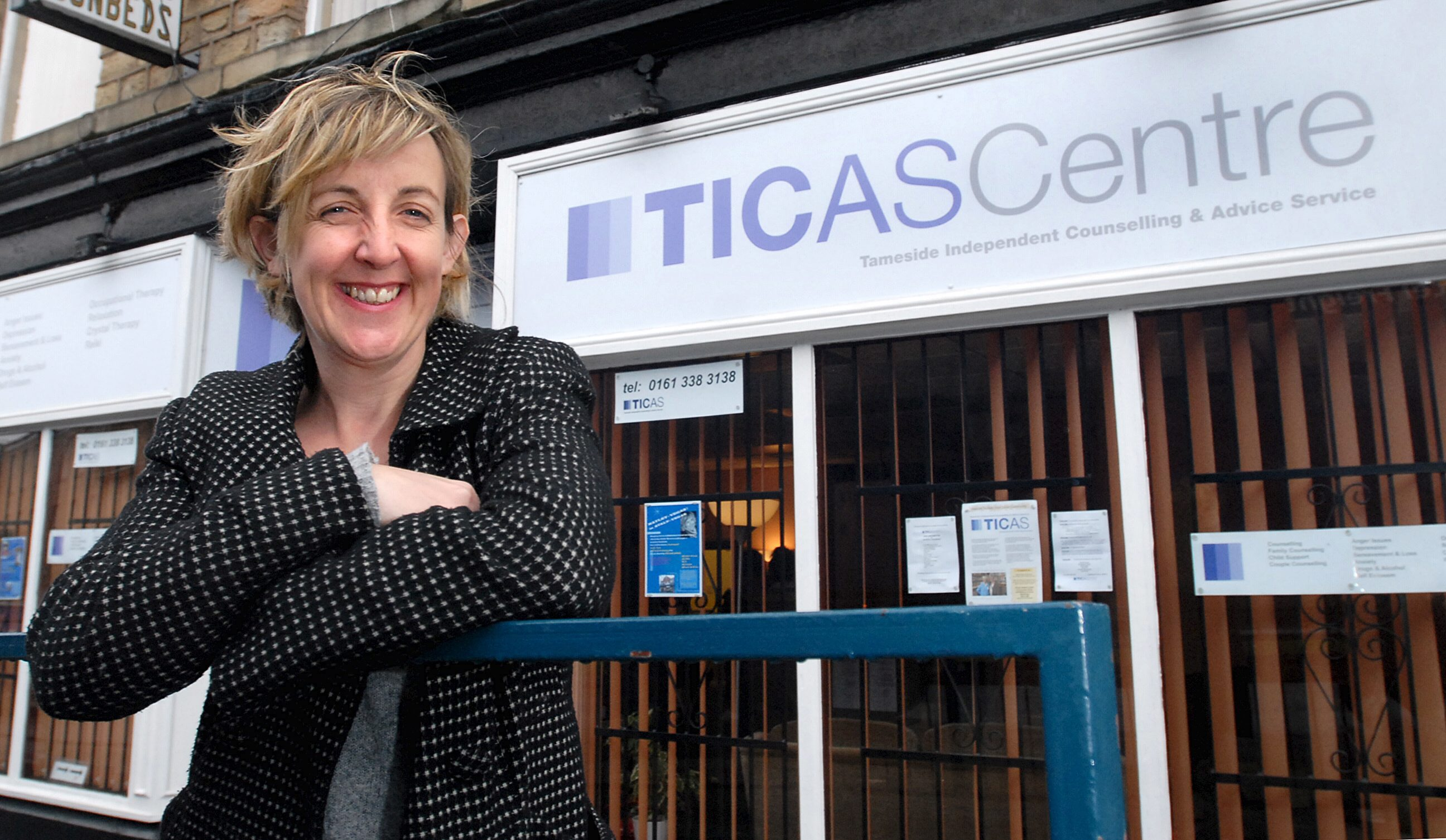
Julie Hesmondhalgh

Characters in series three of Broadchurch included the following:

=== Police ===
- Detective Inspector Alec Hardy (David Tennant) – returns to Broadchurch with his daughter and continues to work with DS Miller, having been away for a while.
- Detective Sergeant Ellie Miller (Olivia Colman) – working with DI Hardy in Broadchurch while rebuilding her life following her husband's acquittal.
- Detective Constable Katie Harford (Georgina Campbell) – new detective.
- Chief Superintendent Clark (Josette Simon) - DS Ellie Miller's and DI Alec Hardy's superior.

=== Victims ===
- Trish Winterman (Julie Hesmondhalgh) – Leah's mother and Ian's estranged wife. Works for Ed Burnett. She is the rape victim.
- Laura Benson (Kelly Gough) – rape victim two years earlier.
- Nira (Ellora Torchia) - the third assault victim, refuses to speak to the police because she is afraid her family will find out.

=== Suspects and families ===
- Cath Atwood (Sarah Parish) – Jim's wife. Trish's friend and colleague at the local farm shop.
- Jim Atwood (Mark Bazeley) – Cath's husband and owner of the local garage.
- Ian Winterman (Charlie Higson) – Leah's father and Trish's estranged husband. A teacher.
- Leah Winterman (Hannah Millward) – Trish and Ian Winterman's daughter.

=== The Latimers ===
- Beth Latimer (Jodie Whittaker) – mother to Chloe, Lizzie, and murder victim Danny. Now working at “SARA” (which stands for “sexual assault response agency”).
- Mark Latimer (Andrew Buchan) – father to Chloe, Lizzie, and murder victim Danny. Separated from Beth and haunted by the injustice for his late son.
- Chloe Latimer (Charlotte Beaumont) – Beth and Mark's 18-year-old daughter.
- Elizabeth "Lizzie" Latimer (Emily Allison) – Beth and Mark's younger, infant daughter.

=== The Millers ===
- Tom Miller (Adam Wilson) – 15-year-old elder son of DS Ellie Miller.
- David Barrett (Roy Hudd) – Ellie's father. After his wife's death, he moved in with his daughter and her family.
- Fred Miller (Benji Yapp) – younger son of DS Ellie Miller.
- Joe Miller (Matthew Gravelle) – DS Ellie Miller's ex-husband; acquitted of Danny's murder.

=== Press ===
- Maggie Radcliffe (Carolyn Pickles) – editor of the Broadchurch Echo, the local newspaper.
- Caroline Hughes (Mariah Gale) – Chief Executive at the media company that owns the Broadchurch Echo.

=== Townspeople ===
- Ben Haywood (William Andrews) – former junior barrister to QC Knight.
- Nigel "Nige" Carter (Joe Sims) – Mark Latimer's best friend and employee.
- Reverend Paul Coates (Arthur Darvill) – Anglican vicar in Broadchurch.
- Ed Burnett (Lenny Henry) – owner of the local farm shop where Trish and Cath work.
- Daisy Hardy (Hannah Rae) – DI Alec Hardy's 16-year-old daughter.
- Sahana Harrison (Sunetra Sarker) – Beth Latimer's boss at SARA.
- Leo Humphries (Chris Mason) – running his father's fishing supply business.
- Aaron Mayford (Jim Howick) – convicted rapist and sex offender recently released from prison.
- Arthur Tamworth (Richard Hope) – owner of Axehampton House, Cath's birthday party venue.
- Clive Lucas (Sebastian Armesto) – husband to Lindsay and stepfather to Michael. Private minicab driver.
- Lindsay Lucas (Becky Brunning) – wife to Clive and mother to Michael.
- Michael Lucas (Deon Lee-Williams) – Lindsay's son and Tom Miller's friend.
- Sarah Elsey (Charlotte Lucas) – colleague and mistress to Ian Winterman.

== Episodes ==
| No. overall | Episode | Directed by | Written by | Original release date | UK viewers (millions) |
|---|---|---|---|---|---|
| 17 | Episode 1 | Paul Andrew Williams | Chris Chibnall | 27 February 2017 | 10.75 |
Trish Winterman (Julie Hesmondhalgh) reports being raped after a party held by Jim and Cath Atwood (Mark Bazeley and Sarah Parish) several days earlier. She was hit on the head with something, then regained consciousness bound and gagged, and could not see who attacked her. DS Ellie Miller (Olivia Colman) and DI Alec Hardy (David Tennant) are called; they determine that it was a premeditated attack rather than a crime of opportunity, leading to fears that there may be a serial rapist on the loose planning to strike again. Ellie is called to Tom's school because they found porn on Tom's phone. She takes his phone.
| 18 | Episode 2 | Paul Andrew Williams | Chris Chibnall | 6 March 2017 | 10.76 |
Miller and Hardy continue their investigation, focusing on the twine used in the attack and securing voluntary DNA samples from all the male guests at the party. They are met with less than cooperative attitudes, including from the victim, Trish. Leo Humphries (Chris Mason), a 20-something managing his father's fishing supply business, is not eager to supply samples of twine. Ellie asks Beth Latimer (Jodie Whittaker), who now works for a social services agency that helps victims, to reach out to Trish. Complicating the DNA evidence, Trish reveals she had consensual, unprotected sex the morning before the attack, but refuses to say with whom. She later receives a threatening text from an unknown number, telling her to "shut up."
| 19 | Episode 3 | Paul Andrew Williams | Chris Chibnall | 13 March 2017 | 10.29 |
Trish's estranged husband, Ian Winterman (Charlie Higson), claims to be struggling to remember what happened at the party, having got so drunk he blacked out. When taxi driver Clive Lucas (Sebastian Armesto) is caught in multiple lies, he confesses he picked up an unknown man on the road the night of the party that he did not report in order to pocket the whole fare, and also that he was accused of harassment by a previous female fare. He is later seen with a pair of keys that belong to Trish. Mark Latimer (Andrew Buchan) tries to convince Beth to pursue a civil case against Joe Miller (who has moved away and cannot be found) for the wrongful death of their son, Danny, but Beth and their daughter Chloe (Charlotte Beaumont) are furious with the idea.
| 20 | Episode 4 | Daniel Nettheim | Chris Chibnall | 20 March 2017 | 10.46 |
Trish accompanies Ellie Miller and Hardy to Axehampton House, the country house where the party was held and the attack occurred, to go over her memories of the night of the party. She becomes physically ill as she recounts the attack outside near a waterfall. She recalls a light in the distance and the smell of vodka. Axehampton House's owner, Arthur Tamworth (Richard Hope), gives Miller and Hardy a box of items found around the estate after the attack, including a cricket bat his grandchildren played with, but tells them there is a matching bat they cannot find. Ellie and Hardy discover a local man, Aaron Mayford (Jim Howick), was recently paroled for a rape in which he tied up his victim. He confidently provides an alibi, but Hardy is perturbed by his gallery of pinup photos in his garage, which he calls his "motivation" for weight-training in the garage. He is placed under surveillance, but spots young DC Katie Harford (Georgina Campbell) parked in her car watching his house. He gets in the car while her partner is getting lunch and he makes several threatening sexual innuendos towards her. Jim Atwood's DNA is a match to the rape kit, and he confesses to sleeping with Trish that morning before their party. The threatening SMS messages Trish received are traced to her estranged husband, Ian. He denies it, but his girlfriend, Sarah Elsey (Charlotte Lucas), admits sending the text, but claims she sent it before she knew about the rape. To up the pressure on the police and make them fear they are indeed dealing with a serial rapist, a second woman comes forward after seeing newspaper reports of the attack, informing the police that she was tied up and raped in a field two years earlier, but had not reported it at the time.
| 21 | Episode 5 | Daniel Nettheim | Chris Chibnall | 27 March 2017 | 10.70 |
Laura Benson (Kelly Gough), the second victim, shares details of her rape that match Trish's account, including being gagged, tied up and the smell of alcohol. She said she never reported it because she was drunk and thought she wouldn't be believed. The released sex offender Mayford, who worked with the employers of both victims, is arrested for Trish's assault. Hardy and Miller are told of a third victim by social services, who refused to report it to the police. The timeline, however, rules out Mayford, who was still in prison during the attack. Ian, who needs a place to live after breaking up with Sarah, asks shop owner Ed Burnett (Lenny Henry) if he can rent his caravan. Ed refuses and says Ian deserves his suffering for losing Trish. Cath, hurt after her good friend Trish confesses to sleeping with her husband, tells Jim not to come back to the marital home, and tells Ed, her boss, about Trish and Jim's conduct. Taxi driver Clive Lucas picks up Jim Atwood after his van breaks down, and he tells Jim he saw him with Trish outside the night of the party having an intense conversation. Jim forces him to pull over, chokes him and threatens him to never say anything about it again. Ed shows up at Jim's workshop and viciously attacks him. Late at night, Ian sneaks into Trish's house.
| 22 | Episode 6 | Lewis Arnold | Chris Chibnall | 3 April 2017 | 10.57 |
Danny Latimer (Oskar McNamara) returns via a dream to talk with his father, Mark. Mark finds Joe Miller working as a security guard in Liverpool and confronts him, demanding details of Danny's murder. Joe reluctantly agrees, lamenting to Mark how his life will never be the same and how alone he feels in the world. The two part ways after Mark fails to find the courage to use his utility knife to hurt Joe. Jim Atwood files a complaint against Ed for the assault, who is arrested in relation to the rape of Trish after Ellie finds the same blue twine in his shop that matches the twine used in the assault. DC Katie Harford is forced to leave the station after admitting that Ed is her father. Ed insists he is in love with Trish, and thousands of photos of her are found on his phone indicating he has been obsessed with her for years. Ian, who entered his wife's house to take her laptop, claims that Ed had been sexually harassing Trish. The third assault victim, Nira (Ellora Torchia), refuses to speak to the police because she is afraid her family will find out. Ellie finds out her son took his phone back and finds porn on it again, which Tom says he was given by Michael Lucas, the son of Clive Lucas the taxi driver. Beth tells her daughter Chloe that she feels she must file for divorce. A despondent Mark, who is still seeing visions of Danny, phones Chloe to tell her he loves her then takes a boat out to sea and climbs into the water, floating away from Broadchurch.
| 23 | Episode 7 | Paul Andrew Williams | Chris Chibnall | 10 April 2017 | 10.66 |
Mark is rescued after a fisherman finds his empty boat and calls out the RNLI, and hospitalised with hypothermia. With the clock running out, Hardy and Miller try to make a case against Ed but are forced to let him go. They discover the second victim, Laura Benson, used Atwood's breakdown service before her rape. Jim Atwood's wife, Cath, searches his car and is shocked to find a box of condoms with a receipt dating the purchase to the day of her party, and takes them to the police after Trish confirms her attacker wore a condom. Jim tells them he bought them to use with a young waitress, who confirms she had sex with him in the woods outside the party, but forced him to stop when he became rough. Ian confesses to installing spyware on Trish's computer to spy on her via her webcam, then admits it was young Leo Humphries (Chris Mason) who installed it for him. Trish's daughter, Leah, arranges a gathering to protest against the rapes for Trish. During the gathering, Cath and Trish reconcile. Ed finds a bag with blue twine in it, with blood stains, outside his shop and reports it to police, who recognise it as from the rape. Lindsay Lucas (Becky Brunning) finds her husband's stash of items he has stolen, including Trish's keys. The police find a sock with Trish's DNA and believe it was used to gag her. A man's DNA is found on it as well, which matches one of the DNA samples the police have taken.
| 24 | Episode 8 | Paul Andrew Williams | Chris Chibnall | 17 April 2017 | 11.61 |
Clive Lucas is arrested after his DNA is found on the sock. His wife shows the police his collection of items, including Trish's keys. He recognises the sock as the type he wore to play football but denies raping Trish. Ed is questioned about the bloody twine but denies he knows anything about it - and it was not found to be there during an earlier search of the property. Under questioning that he isn't telling everything, he confesses that he heard Trish being raped that night at the party when he was in the woods, but thought it was only two drunken people having sex, and is consumed by guilt because he could have saved Trish if only he knew what was happening. CCTV from the farm shop shows it was Leo Humphries who dumped the bag of twine. Clive is forced by Hardy and Miller to reveal that he drove his step-son Michael and Leo home after the party. Michael and Leo are arrested, and a flashback shows Clive slapping Michael at a football match. Leo befriends Michael and starts drinking with him and provides him with porn. After Michael admits he is a virgin, Leo arranges for his girlfriend to have sex with him. They later go to the party at Axehampton House, where Leo hits Trish over the head in the woods and forces Michael to rape her. Back in the present, Michael tearfully confesses into being forced to rape Trish. Clive begs Hardy and Miller to charge him instead in order to save his son. Police find a phone hidden at Leo's house, with videos of the attack on Trish and also of Leo raping Laura Benson and two other unknown women. Leo arrogantly and unrepentantly confesses to the rapes, saying he didn't think it was a big deal as all the women had already had sex. Beth and Mark Latimer speak about their problems but are unable to reconcile. An emotional Miller is consoled by Hardy, who promises her that Leo is an aberration and does not represent all men. Later, the whole town attends Paul's final sermon before he presumably leaves Broadchurch. After saying goodbye to his family, Mark drives off on his own. In the end, Miller and Hardy later reflect back to the case and get ready to see each other at work the next day.

== Reception ==
=== Awards ===
Broadchurch won the award for best Crime Drama at National Television Awards in early 2018. This was the first year the award was presented and Broadchurch was competing against Sherlock, Line of Duty and Little Boy Blue.
