= Broadchurch series 2 =

Broadchurch
- Series 2
- Cover art of Region 2 DVD release
- No. of episodes: 8

Release
- Original network: ITV
- Original release: 5 January – 23 February 2015

Series chronology
- ← Previous; Series 1 Next → Series 3

The second series of the British crime drama Broadchurch began airing on the ITV broadcast network in the United Kingdom on 5 January 2015. The eight-episode series focused on the continuing fallout of the murder of 11-year-old Danny Latimer in the fictional, close-knit coastal town of Broadchurch in Dorset, England. The series focuses on the effect of Joe Miller's trial on his wife, former DS Ellie Miller (now a uniformed police officer in Devon); the Latimer family's struggle to achieve a normal life during Joe's trial; and new revelations that former DI Alec Hardy is protecting a witness in the failed Sandbrook child murder case.

Although Broadchurch was conceived as a trilogy, the second series was only announced on 22 April 2013 as series one ended. Writing occurred over most of the following year, with series creator and lead writer Chris Chibnall using a plot-development process he used for the first series. The return of series stars Olivia Colman and David Tennant and some of their returning co-stars was reported by the media in late 2013, although both returning and new cast members were not formally announced by ITV until May 2014. Filming began in late May 2014 under the supervision of four directors. Extensive efforts were undertaken to keep the plot secret from the cast, crew and public. Extensive location shooting occurred along the United Kingdom's Jurassic Coast and in South West England. Icelandic musician and composer Ólafur Arnalds returned as the series' musical and sound composer. Series two debuted to very high ratings and critical praise, but subsequent episodes saw a sharp drop in viewership and a more mixed response from critics and audiences alike. Later episodes of the series, however, saw a more positive critical consensus.

== Episodes ==
No. overall	Episode	Directed by	Written by	Original release date	UK viewers (millions)
9	Episode 1	James Strong	Chris Chibnall	5 January 2015	11.34
Joe Miller surprises everyone, including his junior barrister Abby Thompson, by pleading not guilty to Danny Latimer's murder. The Latimers convince highly respected, retired Queen's Counsel Jocelyn Knight to help prosecute Joe, who hires Knight's protégé, barrister Sharon Bishop, as his defence counsel. Alec Hardy, still living in Broadchurch, admits to Ellie that Claire, a witness in the Sandbrook child murder case, is living in Broadchurch. Protecting her is the reason he came to the town, and he convinces Ellie to stay with her as a safety measure. Lee Ashworth arrives in Broadchurch, and steals phone records and a letter about Hardy's medical condition from Hardy's riverside house. Mark Latimer is seen spending time with Tom in Susan Wright's old caravan. Reverend Paul Coates secretly provides spiritual counsel to Joe, while dating hotel owner Becca Fisher. Upon finding out that Bishop has been appointed as Miller's defense counsel, Knight agrees to take on the Latimers' case. Danny's body is exhumed from his grave following official court orders; Hardy sees Ashworth standing by the hill, watching him.
10	Episode 2	James Strong	Chris Chibnall	12 January 2015	9.88
Claire receives a voicemail from Lee, and Hardy confronts his old nemesis, Claire's ex-husband and the lead suspect in the Sandbrook case. A pregnant Beth and Mark disagree on how to keep their marriage intact. Knight meets with Ellie and Hardy, and tells them Ellie's assault on Joe has jeopardised the case. Hardy wants Claire to confront Lee, and gets Ellie to convince her to do so. Beth inappropriately invites Knight to a meeting with her family and friends, and Knight warns them that a conviction is not guaranteed. Beth testifies, and is forced to reveal Mark's affair with Becca Fisher and how Mark struck Danny. Hardy testifies to Ellie's assault on Joe, and because of it, Bishop is able to prevail on Judge Sonia Sharma to exclude Joe's confession from evidence, the main plank of the prosecution case against him. Ellie returns to her old home, where Claire will meet Lee, whilst Mark meets with Tom and confesses his guilt over Danny's death. When Ellie arrives with Claire to meet with Lee Beth confronts Ellie in the street, angry that Ellie's assault has made Joe's confession inadmissible in court. While Hardy and Ellie are occupied with this, Lee escapes with Claire while Beth's waters break.
11	Episode 3	Jessica Hobbs	Chris Chibnall	19 January 2015	9.27
Beth's daughter, Elizabeth, is born at home. Hardy finds Claire and confronts her about the pressed bluebells she received through the post, with Lee later denying it was he who had sent them. Bishop visits her son, Jonah, in prison. Knight cares for her senile mother, Margery, at a private nursing home, and later has a car accident at night due to her failing eyesight. Hardy's testimony continues, and doubt is cast on Joe's use of mobiles and a laptop as evidence he committed Danny's murder. Rev. Coates visits the Latimers, where Mark expresses an anti-religious view. Ellie and Claire go to a bar, where Ellie surreptitiously checks Claire's mobile phone for calls from Lee. Drunk, Ellie has sex with a man she meets in the bar. Lee gives Hardy evidence he has compiled himself on other suspects in the Sandbrook case. Claire tells Ellie she was drugged the night of the Sandbrook murders, and Hardy admits to Ellie that Claire is not telling the truth about Sandbrook. Judge Sharma rules Ellie must testify, and during her testimony, Bishop accuses Ellie of having an affair with Hardy and framing Joe for Danny's murder.
12	Episode 4	Jessica Hobbs	Chris Chibnall	26 January 2015	9.20
Mark tells Beth he wants to take time off work to help care for Elizabeth, and later tells Tom he cannot meet him any more. Lee confronts Ellie, warning that Hardy and Claire are lovers. Ellie's sister Lucy testifies that she saw Joe putting a bag into a bin the night Danny died, despite having told the police at the time that she simply saw an unidentified man. Bishop and Thompson decide Joe cannot be put on the witness stand as he would not be convincing in cross-examination. As Ellie drives Hardy to Sandbrook, he tells her details about the case. Lee and Claire spend the night together. Hardy meets Cate Gillespie, one of the victim's mothers, who reveals information about her husband Ricky, who was not with her the night Cate's daughter Pippa and niece Lisa were kidnapped. Susan tells Nige she's dying of cancer, but he does not believe her. At dinner with his ex-wife and daughter, Hardy is accosted by Ricky, who tells him to leave the case lie. Ellie tells Hardy about Claire's mobile phone Internet searches, all about Lee. She also reveals that Claire only had two numbers on her phone: Hardy's and an unknown number; when she dials it, we see it is Ricky's phone ringing, but he does not reply so the police do not know it is him. Olly posts a picture of Lee on the Echo website, saying that he has moved to Broadchurch, which alarms many local people. Susan testifies in court that she saw Nige placing Danny's body on the beach at Broadchurch.
13	Episode 5	Jonathan Teplitzky	Chris Chibnall	2 February 2015	8.91
Ellie tries to reconcile with her son, Tom. Ellie and Hardy investigate Ricky's alleged disappearance the night his daughter was killed, finding that his wife Cate's assumption that he was sleeping with one of the bridesmaids is wrong - he made a pass at her, but she turned him down, so his movements are unaccounted for. Susan continues to testify that she saw Nige put Danny's body on the beach, to the detriment of the defence. Ellie and Hardy confront Claire about her lies regarding the night of the Sandbrook murders. Beth and Mark quarrel over the direction their married life will take. Ricky talks with Hardy and Ellie about the Sandbrook murders, while Lee watches from afar. Ellie pledges to solve the case. Ricky discovers where Lee is in Broadchurch and attacks him, Hardy intervenes and afterward asks Lee more questions about Sandbrook. Bishop confronts Knight about her refusal to defend Jonah. Tom approaches Abby Thompson, saying he wants to testify in favour of Joe. Ellie and Hardy investigate Thorp Agriservices, linked to the Sandbrook case, and discover that an abandoned factory at Portsmouth disposes of dead animals by use of furnaces.
14	Episode 6	Jonathan Teplitzky	Chris Chibnall	9 February 2015	9.33
Tom testifies that Mark admitted guilt for Danny's death, but Knight gets him to admit he lied. Hardy cuts off Claire's protection, then receives more Sandbrook evidence from Tess. Ellie meets the Gillespies and Cate denies knowledge of Thorp Agriservices. Hardy shows Ellie a door in the fence between the Gillespie and Ashworth/Ripley houses, which Lee built after he and Claire moved in. Mark testifies in court to having sex with Becca the night of Danny's murder, accounting for his whereabouts. Bishop gets Mark to admit to having been allowed into the police station cells to confront Joe and asks Justice Sharma to dismiss the case. Knight investigates the breach of procedure, and the Judge allows the case to proceed. Hardy goes into hospital to get a pacemaker fitted. Olly sleeps with Abby, who discovers information about Lucy. Ellie sees a picture of Claire wearing Pippa's pendant, but Claire realises she has noticed it and destroys the picture. In separate flashbacks, Lisa Newberry tells Claire that she hates her aunt, Cate, Lee pleads with Claire not to follow through on their plan, and Claire is shown as the robber who broke into Tess' car during the Sandbrook case and stole the pendant.
15	Episode 7	Mike Barker	Chris Chibnall	16 February 2015	9.33
Ellie tells Hardy about the pendant in Claire's picture, and Tess discovers Gary Thorp has a link to the Gillespies. Ellie tells Claire about seeing the photo. Hardy tells Lee the Sandbrook case has been reopened, and that Claire got pregnant while Lee was in jail. In court, Bishop accuses Ellie of bribing Lucy to identify the man she saw dumping clothing into a bin as Joe, in order to frame him. Gary admits to getting a loan from the Gillespies and stalking Lisa Newberry, but provides an alibi for the night of the murder. Hardy confronts Ricky and sees a photo of bluebells on his office wall, while Ellie discovers that the mysterious phone number on Claire's phone is Ricky's office number. Lee attacks Claire, who admits to aborting his baby, and Lee breaks up with her. Knight and Bishop make their closing arguments. Knight and Maggie renew their decades-old love affair. Rev. Coates meets Claire, unaware of who she is. Hardy and Miller catch Lee in a lie about the night Pippa and Lisa disappeared. The jury cannot initially agree on a verdict so are sent away to reconsider. Beth tells Ellie she may leave Mark. Claire gives the pendant to Hardy. The jury are called back again and can now reach a verdict.
16	Episode 8	Mike Barker	Chris Chibnall	23 February 2015	10.17
Joe Miller is found not guilty. Hardy arrests Claire for her part in the Sandbrook case, telling Lee she turned herself in. Hardy and Ellie interview Claire. Ellie discovers Lee replaced the floorboards in his house to conceal the murders, and they arrest him. Flashbacks reveal Lee had sex with Lisa after punching her stalker. Discovering them, Ricky killed Lisa in a rage. Pippa heard everything, and Ricky tells her Lee hurt Lisa. To protect Lee, Claire drugs Pippa with Rohypnol from Ricky's flask and manipulates Lee into murdering Pippa. She tells Ricky that Pippa died from a reaction to the Rohypnol, threatening him with the flask as evidence should he go to the police. In the present, Ricky is arrested, confessing to burying Lisa at the church where Lee was working. Knight reconciles with Bishop. Joe was released after being found not guilty and has hidden in the church, but Mark and Nigel kidnap him and take him to the beach house where Danny died. Coates has arranged for Ellie and Beth to be there, and they demand Joe leave and never return, with Ellie threatening to kill him if he attempts to see their children. The Latimers, Millers, Stevens, and Nigel watch as Joe leaves Broadchurch. Hardy also prepares to leave, feeling his penance is over.

=== Supplement content ===
On 23 February 2015, ITV announced Broadchurch would return for a third series, with Tennant and Colman as the leads.

== Cast ==
=== Police ===
- Detective Inspector Alec Hardy (David Tennant) – invalided from Wessex Police at the end of Series 1 because of a heart problem, Hardy is now a Training Officer and awaiting an operation. He attempts to hide Claire Ripley, his key witness in the failed Sandbrook murder case, in Broadchurch.
- Detective Sergeant Ellie Miller (Olivia Colman) – married to defendant Joe Miller, mother to 13-year-old Tom and two-year-old Fred. She berates herself for not recognising the problems that led her husband to have a relationship with Danny and suffers from guilt. Following this, she moved to Devon to become a uniformed Police Constable (PC) with Devon and Cornwall Police. She later returns to Broadchurch with her son Tom and regained her position as a Detective Sergeant.
- Detective Sergeant Tess Henchard (Lucy Cohu) – Hardy's ex-wife. She remains employed with the South Mercia Constabulary, the same force that investigated the Sandbrook Case.

=== The Latimers ===
- Beth Latimer (Jodie Whittaker) – mother to Chloe and murder victim Danny, and wife to Mark. She struggles with grief, and is bitter and angry toward her former friend, Ellie Miller. Beth's pregnancy, which began in series one, is close to term at the start of series two.
- Mark Latimer (Andrew Buchan) – father to Chloe and murder victim Danny, and husband to Beth. His son's death helped him to reconcile with his wife after he had an affair with local hotelkeeper Becca Fisher, but the problems in his marriage didn't go away. He is secretly meeting with Tom Miller, with whom he has closely bonded.
- Chloe Latimer (Charlotte Beaumont) – Beth and Mark's 16-year-old daughter.

=== The Millers ===
- Joe Miller (Matthew Gravelle) – Ellie's husband and father to 12-year-old Tom and 2-year-old Fred. Joe murdered Danny Latimer in series one, and is now on trial after pleading not guilty. He says he will expose secrets other Broadchurch residents are hiding.
- Tom Miller (Adam Wilson) – Ellie and Joe's 12-year-old elder son. He blames his mother for his father's incarceration, and is living with his aunt Lucy and cousin Olly.
- Lucy Stevens (Tanya Franks) – sister of Ellie Miller and mother of Oliver "Olly" Stevens, she has a gambling habit. She witnessed Joe destroying evidence in the Latimer case, but this is known only to the police.

=== Press ===
- Maggie Radcliffe (Carolyn Pickles) – editor of the local newspaper, the Broadchurch Echo, and a friend of Jocelyn Knight's.
- Oliver "Olly" Stevens (Jonathan Bailey) – Lucy Stevens' son and Ellie Miller's nephew, he is a reporter for the Broadchurch Echo and is caring for his cousin Tom Miller.

=== Lawyers ===
- Ben Haywood (William Andrews) – QC Knight's junior barrister.
- Sharon Bishop QC (Marianne Jean-Baptiste) – Joe's lead defence counsel. She was once Jocelyn Knight's pupil.
- Jocelyn Knight QC (Charlotte Rampling) – a Broadchurch resident and former barrister who is persuaded out of retirement to lead the prosecution against Miller. Danny Latimer argued with the postman near her home a short time before he was murdered. The character's name and role was a "comically strict secret" on the series.
- Abby Thompson (Phoebe Waller-Bridge) – Sharon Bishop's junior barrister.
- The Honourable Mrs Justice (Sonia) Sharma (Meera Syal) – the judge overseeing Joe Miller's trial.

=== Townsfolk ===
- Lee Ashworth (James D'Arcy) – Claire Ripley's former husband, and the lead suspect in the failed Sandbrook murder case.
- Jonah Bishop Nakay Kpaka – QC Bishop's imprisoned son.
- Nigel "Nige" Carter (Joe Sims) – Mark Latimer's best friend and co-worker at the plumbing company.
- Reverend Paul Coates (Arthur Darvill) – a young Anglican priest in Broadchurch, he secretly provides spiritual counsel to Joe Miller. Becca Fisher is his current love interest.
- Becca Fisher (Simone McAullay) – the owner and manager of the Trader Hotel who once had an affair with Mark Latimer. Reverend Paul Coates is her current love interest.
- Daisy Hardy (Hannah Rae) – Fifteen-year-old daughter of DI Alec Hardy.
- Claire Ripley (Eve Myles) – a witness in the Sandbrook murder case, Hardy attempted to protect her by hiding her in Broadchurch. Married to Lee, now separated.
- Susan Wright (Pauline Quirke) – Nigel's biological mother, whose first husband raped and then murdered their daughter. Embittered by her incarceration as an accessory to his crimes (she denied her guilt), she sought to reconcile with Nigel, whom authorities took from her and placed for adoption. She fled Broadchurch as the search for Danny's killer reached its climax, but is a critical eyewitness to the crime.

=== The Gillespies ===
- Cate Gillespie (Amanda Drew) – The mother of murdered Pippa, and wife to Ricky. Left bitter and alcoholic by her daughter's death, she divorced her philandering husband when the Sandbrook case fell apart.
- Ricky Gillespie (Shaun Dooley) – Father of murdered Pippa, and husband to Cate. He blames Hardy for the collapse of the case against Lee Ashworth, but hid an affair with Claire Ripley.
- Pippa Gillespie (Hollie Burgess) – Twelve-year-old daughter of Cate and Ricky. She was being babysat by her cousin, Lisa, when she was kidnapped and murdered. Her body was found in a stream by Alec Hardy.
- Lisa Newbery (Eliza Bennett) – Nineteen-year-old cousin of Pippa Gillespie. Kidnapped along with Pippa, her body has never been found.

== Production ==
=== Production approval ===
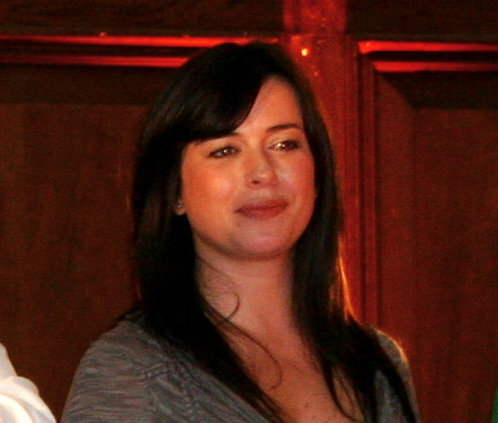
Torchwood actress Eve Myles joined the cast of series two in a pivotal role

While conceiving and writing the first series in 2012, Broadchurch creator and lead writer Chris Chibnall designed his story to be told as a trilogy. Series one was written to work both as the first part of this trilogy as well as a self-contained drama. The first series had to be self-contained, he felt, in case the show did not do well in the ratings and a second series was not commissioned. When Chibnall pitched series one to ITV in the autumn of 2012, he also pitched series two and three at the same time.

As series one aired, Chibnall had discussions with ITV executives about commissioning series two. According to Chibnall, ITV was more concerned that people were enjoying the show than they were with the series' ratings (which were very high). ITV agreed to green-light series two about midway through the airing of series one. This allowed Chibnall to announce series two as a "gift" to viewers at the end of series one, so the public would not remain in suspense about a second series.

The final episode of series one finished on 22 April 2013 with a caption reading "Broadchurch Will Return". ITV executives confirmed that same night that a second series of Broadchurch had been commissioned, with production to begin in 2014. Following this episode, an extra scene was released on YouTube depicting Danny Latimer's wake. This video also ended with the words "Broadchurch Will Return". Olivia Colman said that Chibnall telephoned the cast of series one before the announcement to tell them that series two had been greenlit, and outlined his concepts for series two.

Jane Featherstone and Chris Chibnall continued as executive producers of the programme in series two, with Richard Stokes returning as producer. Chibnall also acted as lead writer. ITV executive creative director Tony Pipes declined to reveal the budget for series two, but said it was about the same as other major drama series at the network.

=== Writing ===
Chibnall told the Daily Mirror in the summer of 2013 that "the focus of the next series will be on how the shattered community rebuilds itself after the grisly events" of series one. Series one actor Will Mellor strongly implied in an interview that a new murder would not be the focus of the new season, while actor David Tennant told the Associated Press that the series would go in a "very unexpected direction" which he called "as gripping as the first season". While grief was the key theme of series one, Chibnall chose an entirely different theme for series two. Tennant described series two, "Tonally, it's the same show, but structurally, it's completely different."

Chibnall said he mapped out the show's plot and characters on several whiteboards in his office before beginning the writing process. "You have to be very methodical," he said about plotting Broadchurch. "It's like a mathematical puzzle where you put all these blocks together and move them around for the most satisfying thing." Chibnall was assisted in storyboarding series two by his good friend Sam Hoyle, a television script executive who also worked with him in laying out series one. "By the time I sat down to type scenes and dialogue," Chibnall said, "I'd already done quite a lot of work." As early as mid-July 2013, Chibnall told the Daily Mirror that he had finalised the plot and written the second series' first and last scenes, and was now working on the rest of the script. Chibnall also said that the second series' themes, story, and basic mysteries are clearly established by the end of the first episode. Much of series two draws on plot elements established in series one. Lead actor Olivia Colman noted "You find out very early in the first episode which direction it's going in and it's an instant, 'Whoooa!'. Chris set up a lot of things we never even thought about in the first series and now they've come to the fore. At the read-through we were going, 'You sneaky b*****d'." There were constant rewrites of the script as filming occurred.

In August 2014, Erin Kelly, author of the Broadchurch novelisation, said that Chibnall inserted a one-line clue about series two into her book three days before printing was due to begin. Kelly said the clue is revealed in the early pages. Although it does not spoil the plot, she said, it does provide a hint about it. The clue involved the argument the postman had with Danny Latimer. Jack Marshall identifies the location as near Jocelyn Knight's home. On 19 December 2014, ITV revealed that Charlotte Rampling's character is named Jocelyn Knight.

=== Casting ===
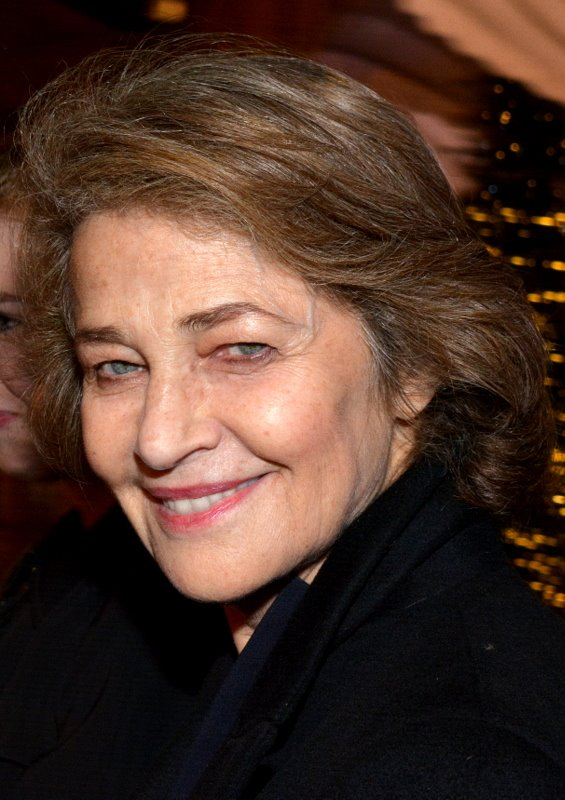
The role of a barrister in the Crown Prosecution Service was written specifically for Charlotte Rampling

Actor Matthew Gravelle was the first member of the series one cast to be asked to return for series two. Chris Chibnall asked him if he would appear in a "courtroom drama" follow-on to Broadchurch the next year, and Gravelle instantly agreed. Only his wife, actress Mali Harries, knew of his participation.

According to Olivia Colman, Chris Chibnall telephoned the series one cast in April 2013 and secured their verbal assent to return for another season. But it wasn't clear who would be returning. Jodie Whittaker said the cast was told during the week between episodes seven and eight of series one that Broadchurch was being brought back for a second season. But Chibnall did not tell the actors who would be returning for series two.

David Tennant and Olivia Colman both agreed to star in series two. Neither actor was obliged to return, but without them, Chibnall said, "We would not have done it, absolutely. Luckily they wanted to come back because they weren't contracted to." Chibnall initially expressed his opinion that Tennant would be unable to return, due to both Tennant's heavy work schedule as well as character Alec Hardy's health problems. Attitude magazine went so far as to call Tennant's return "unlikely". Nevertheless, Colman and Tennant's participation was first reported by the Daily Mirror in late October 2013. Colman confirmed her participation on 5 November 2013. Tennant denied being cast on the show in February 2014, saying "I'm still waiting" to hear if his character would be in the second series, but his participation was attested to in March 2014 by co-star Jodie Whittaker. Colman and Tennant's casting was officially announced by ITV on 12 May 2014 by the Radio Times.

Other returning cast members included Andrew Buchan ("Mark Latimer"), Arthur Darvill ("Rev. Paul Coates"), Jodie Whittaker ("Beth Latimer"), Charlotte Beaumont ("Chloe Latimer"), Joe Sims ("Nigel Carter"), Carolyn Pickles ("Maggie Radcliffe"), Jonathan Bailey ("Olly Stevens"), Pauline Quirke ("Susan Wright"), Tanya Franks ("Lucy Stevens"), Simone McAullay ("Becca Fisher"), and Adam Wilson ("Tom Miller"). Darvill confirmed his casting for series two on 17 September 2013. Buchan and Whittaker's participation was announced on 12 May 2014. Beaumont's return was reported on 30 May 2014 when Metro printed photographs of her filming a scene with other cast members. Sims' casting was finally revealed in late August 2014, when the media reported he was shooting scenes for series two. Actor Will Mellor's character (alleged psychic Steve Connolly) and actress Vicky McClure's character (journalist Karen White) do not return in series two. Actor Matthew Gravelle's return was never confirmed prior to airing.

Casting for Broadchurch series one was overseen by casting directors Kelly Valentine Hendry and Victor Jenkins of VHJ Casting. New series two cast members included James D'Arcy, Marianne Jean-Baptiste, Eve Myles, Charlotte Rampling, Meera Syal, and Phoebe Waller-Bridge. None of the new characters were connected to the Latimer murder or any other homicide, Chibnall said. Rampling was named to the cast on 12 May, and Chibnall said her "character is an integral part of the new story". He decided to ask Rampling to join the cast after seeing her perform in a video art piece directed by Steve McQueen. ITV announced that D'Arcy, Jean-Baptiste, Myles, and Waller-Bridge were joining the series on 21 May 2014. Rampling, who lives in France, had seen series one on French television and was a fan of the programme. "The sense of community, the idea of solidarity in a small town — all that is broken when suspicion starts to creep in. There is something very human about it. You don't know what happens in real life when people suffer this kind of tragedy. People go off and live their lives. But here we can actually accompany them and go through the grieving process with them."

Eve Myles' agent called her on 15 February 2014, just four days after Myles gave birth to her daughter, Sienna, telling Myles of the opportunity to audition for Broadchurch. Myles auditioned on videotape in her home, performing her scenes as swiftly as she could before her child made noise or needed attention. Ten days after submitting her video audition, Myles learned she'd won the role. After being cast in series two, Myles received the script for the first episode. "I kept it for bedtime; lights off, iPad out, cup of tea in bed," she said. "It was amazing, like watching a film, the writing is so good. I was shocked, exhilarated and surprised. And it made me laugh."

Chibnall said he wrote Jean-Baptiste's role specifically for her. Baptiste admitted that, living in Los Angeles, California, she was unaware of Broadchurch and had heard little about the show from friends when she was approached to star in series two. She watched the programme and was so impressed that she agreed to star in series two without having seen any of the scripts. Syal's casting was not announced until 18 September 2014—about midway through filming. Chibnall also described her role as critical to the plot.

The role of Nigel Carter's adopted mother was played by Anne Sims, the mother of actor Joe Sims. Broadchurch series one had photographs of character Nigel Carter with his adopted mother. The production used actual photos of Sims as a child and teenager with his real-life mother, Anne. When series two needed an actress to play Nigel's adopted mother in a few scenes, Sims suggested his own mother play the role. The producers quickly agreed.

Eight-month-old twin girls Ava and Millie Priddis also were cast in series two. The daughters of Luke Priddis and his partner Rosie, of Beacon Heath, Exeter, the girls' paternal grandmother saw a newspaper advertisement for twin babies to appear on television. Although hundreds of twins applied, the producers settled on Ava and Millie just 30 minutes after receiving their photograph. The girls play a role in the Latimer family, but the exact nature of the role was not clear prior to airing.

ITV News West Country presenter Ian Axton has a cameo in episode one. Axton jokingly asked show creator Chris Chibnall if he could appear in series two after Chibnall appeared on his show. Chibnall surprisingly contacted him some time later and said yes.

=== Principal photography ===
James Strong, who directed five of the eight episodes in series one, directed the first two episodes of series two. Mike Barker, Jessica Hobbs and Jonathan Teplitzky also directed episodes, with Barker directing episodes seven and eight. John Conroy was the director of photography for all eight episodes. Editing for series two was overseen by Mike Jones, Ben Lester, Dom Strevens, and Helen Chapman, with production design by Simon Rogers and art direction by John West.

The production was much larger than for the first series. With many scenes taking place outside the small fictional town of Broadchurch, the production expanded away from the Jurassic Coast to include many more locations over much of Southwest England. With an increase in the size of the cast, this created significant new logistical obstacles. Series two had a concomitant increase in budget, and a much more complex production schedule compared to series one.

==== Secrecy ====
The plot of series two was a closely guarded secret, and ITV and Kudos held meetings to plan security measures long before shooting began. Although already one of series two's highest-budget items, the cost of security on series two went significantly over budget as the public and press sought to learn about the plot. All documents were password-protected, and passwords were changed frequently. Email and other electronic communications between producers, cast and crew could only make oblique reference to plot details, fake emails were circulated to mislead those who might leak them, and some emails were coded.

New cast members were told before being hired that they would be sworn to secrecy about the plot. According to producer Richard Stokes, some of the new cast were surprised at the requirement. "What was really interesting was the new cast members saying 'what do you mean we won't know'. Some lead actors want to know what happens at the end so they can pitch their performance to it. In this they have to trust Chris and have to trust the directors." Cast members swore not to reveal any details of series two, and were required to sign legally binding non-disclosure agreements. Daily call sheets used pseudonyms for cast members and characters. Scripts were individually watermarked to prevent them from being photocopied, used pseudonyms for characters, and were locked away by security guards when not in use by the actors. Each actor's or crew member's script had the individual's name watermarked across the page as well, so that leaks could be traced back to the person responsible.

Actor Andrew Buchan said cast members were told little about the plot, except on a need-to-know basis as they prepared for their performances in each episode. The actors also received only parts of scripts and only two scripts at a time to ensure that they did not know story details too far in advance. Cinematographer John Conroy said the cast and crew did not know how series two ended until three weeks before shooting began on the final two scripts. Two former Coldstream Guards were hired to stand in front of news reporters when they visited the set, to block possible photographs of the filming. Several different endings for series two were filmed, and the cast was not permitted to see completed episodes of the series.

The production went to some length to keep actor Matthew Gravelle's return a secret as well. His character, Joe Miller, confessed to the crime of murder at the end of series one, and there appeared to be no reason for Joe to return in series two. But Chibnall planned to bring Joe back, and include a major plot twist involving him. As late as January 5, his participation in series two remained unconfirmed. To keep Gravelle's presence a secret, he had to wear glasses and a wig and wear a hoodie while filming on location so that the public and press would not recognise him and link him to the programme. Gravelle also had to stay in a different hotel from the rest of the cast, and could not socialise with them after filming ended each day.

ITV held no preview screenings of series two with the press. News media, however, revealed some aspects of the plot as filming occurred. Press outlets confirmed in March 2014 that at least part of the second series would still take place in the fictional town of Broadchurch. At least one scene was filmed in a cemetery, and others depicted a very pregnant Beth Latimer.

The secrecy campaign extended to the soundtrack as well. Composer Ólafur Arnalds (Note: This is an Icelandic name. The last name is a family name, but this person is referred to by the given name Ólafur.) was sworn to secrecy about the plot along with the cast and crew. To prevent hackers from breaking into the computer servers used to store and transmit the music and sound effects to the UK, his studio servers were upgraded using the latest encryption technology and software. Ólafur was prevented from telling his musicians or co-arrangers what sort of scenes his music was intended to accompany. "I just say 'play something exciting!'", he told The Independent.

The secrecy campaign was criticised by reporter Susanna Lazarus of Radio Times. While generally decrying the over-use of plot highlights and one-liners in film and television marketing, she argued that there was nonetheless a role for spoilers so that audiences could decide which shows to watch among the wide array of media choices. There was a "thin line", she said, between too much and too little information, but she asked the producers of Broadchurch to walk it.

==== Location shooting ====
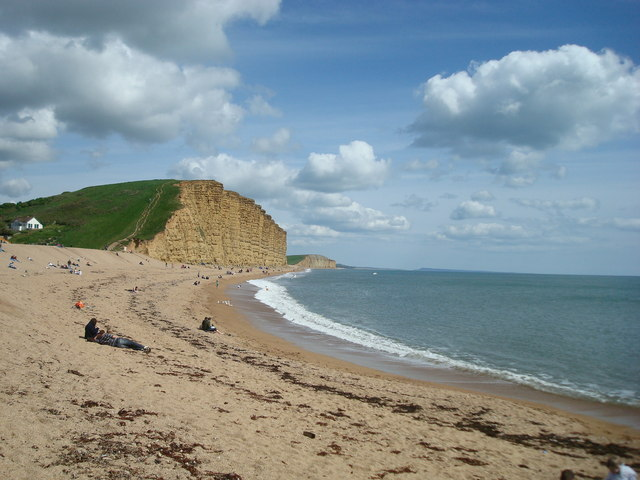
Harbour Cliff and Harbour Cliff Beach, the most prominent locations used in Broadchurch.

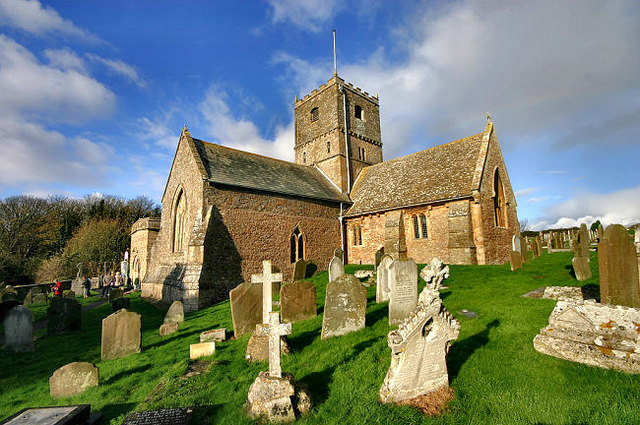
St Andrew's Church, Clevedon, provided exteriors and interiors for the fictional Broadchurch parish church.

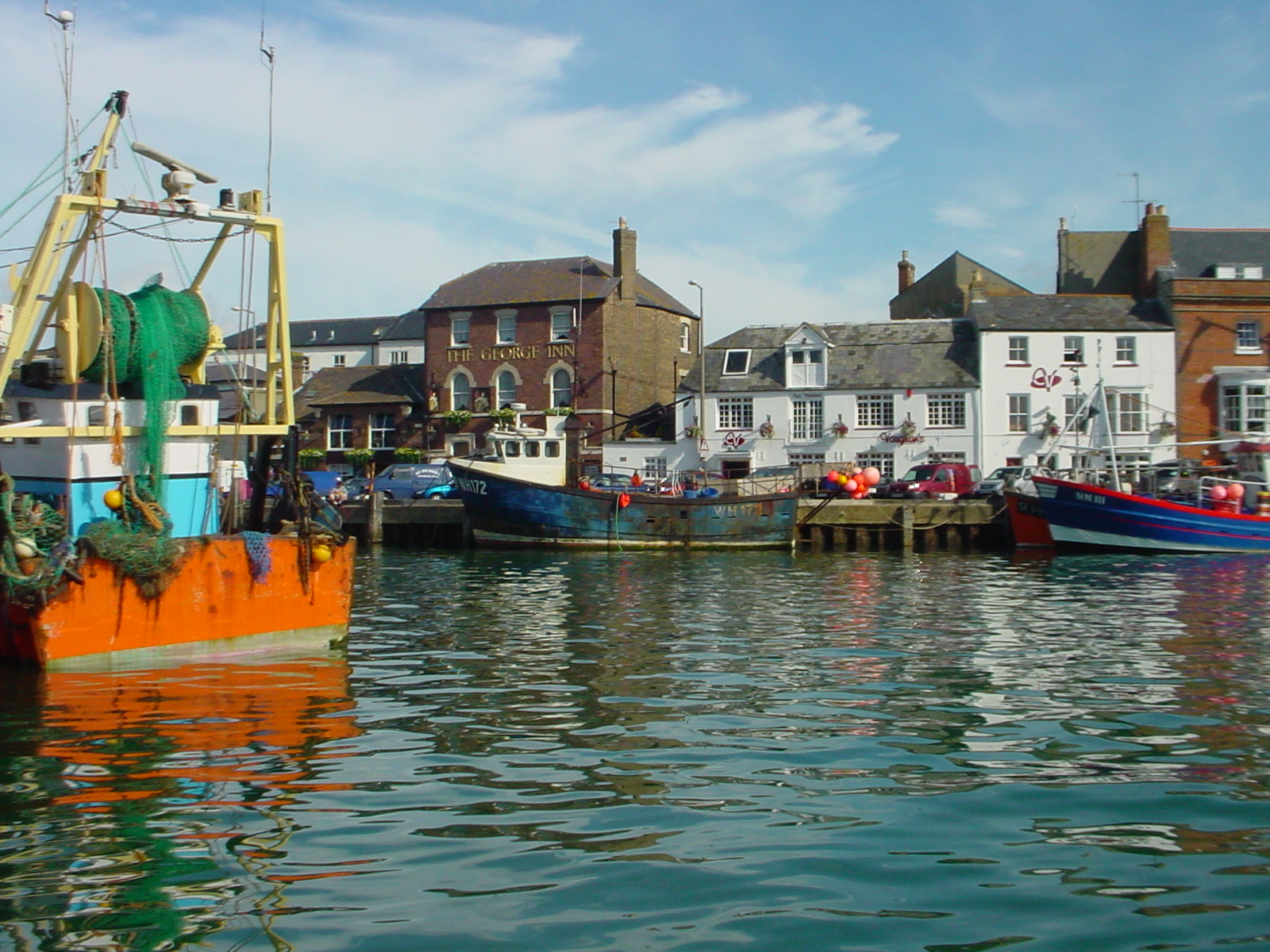
Weymouth Harbour, used for exterior shots in series two.

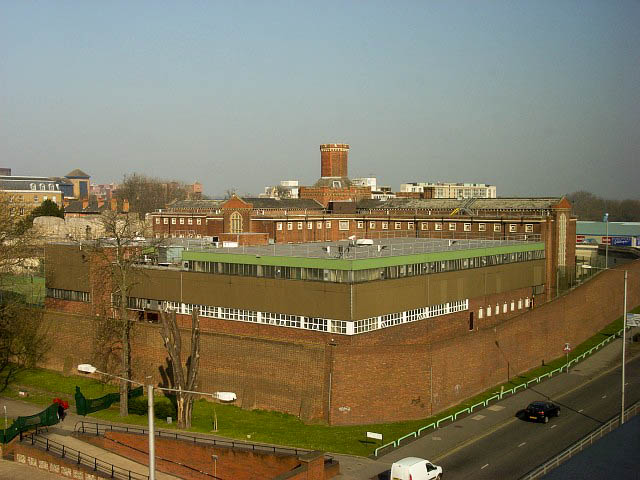
HM Prison Reading provided interior and exterior locations for the fictional Wessex Prison

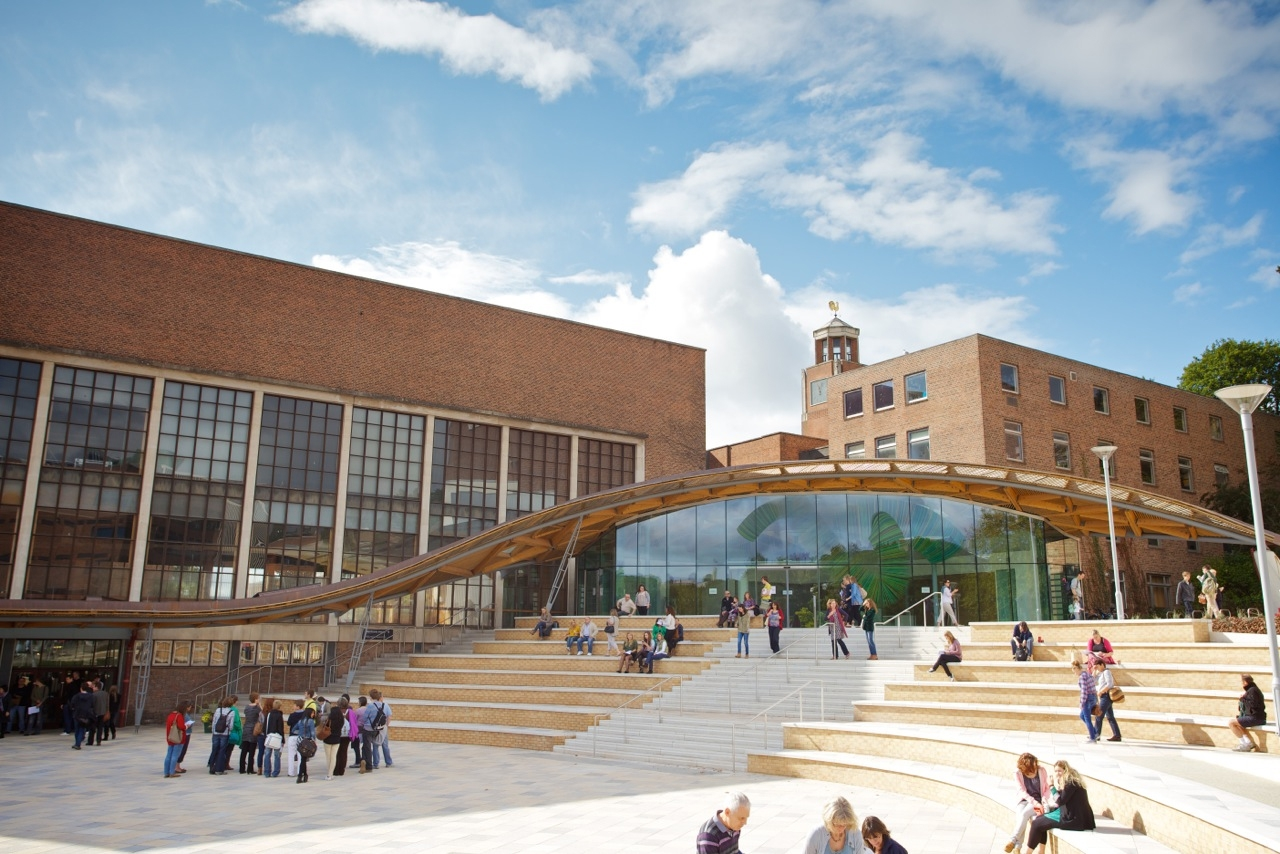
The Forum building at the University of Exeter served as both the fictional Wessex Police headquarters and the Wessex Crown Court.

Much of Broadchurch series two was shot on location. Chibnall felt that location shooting was critical to the mood and tone of series two, much as it had been for series one. While many crime dramas are shot in gritty, urban locations, Chibnall believed that the bucolic Jurassic Coast setting signalled to viewers that Broadchurch was not a typical detective programme. Producer Richard Stokes said that the Dorset area provided "that sense of the extraordinary, [that] the tragic and the terrible [can] happen in a rather beautiful and moving environment." Early in the pre-production process, the producers and location managers discussed filming in locations other than Dorset. Among the areas considered were cliff locations near Bristol; Essex; Hastings in East Sussex; Kent; and Weston-super-Mare in Somerset. But the producers felt none of the locations could replicate the look of the Jurassic Coast, and the quality of the light in each area was different from that in Dorset.

Filming began in late May 2014, with the first cast read-through occurring on 22 May. About 70 cast and crew worked on Broadchurch series two, and each episode took 12 1/2 days to complete. Joel Holmes was the production's location manager. The code name "Tea and Sympathy" was used as a cover to disguise as much of the production's activities as possible.

Shooting primarily occurred in the counties of Berkshire, Devon, Dorset, and Somerset. Most filming occurred in the town of Clevedon in Somerset, with some filming in Bristol. The production spent nearly three months filming at the University of Exeter in the city of Exeter in Devon. Extensive shooting was also done in West Bay in Dorset, where the production used the Station Road Car Park for its production trailers and offices. A car park next to the West Bay Hotel in Bridport served as the production's base camp while filming in that area, while the Rivermead Leisure Centre car park served as production headquarters in Reading, Berkshire. The John Nike Leisuresport Complex served as production headquarters in Bracknell, Berkshire.

Shooting locations for Broadchurch, series two
Town or area	Real-world location	In Broadchurch, served as:	Notes
West Bay, Dorset	Britbank, a blue chalet at Riverside	Alec Hardy's home	
West Bay, Dorset	East Beach	Beach scenes	
West Bay, Dorset	The Folly	Broadchurch station of the Wessex Police	
West Bay, Dorset	Freshwater Beach	Beach scenes	
West Bay, Dorset	The George Hotel	Not known	
West Bay, Dorset	George Street house	Not known	
West Bay, Dorset	Harbour Cliff and Harbour Cliff Beach	Beach scenes; site where Danny Latimer's body was found	
West Bay, Dorset	Ice cream kiosk, The Esplanade	Beachfront vendor where Charlotte Rampling gets ice cream (exteriors)	
West Bay, Dorset	Local roads	Various driving scenes	
West Bay, Dorset	West Bay Harbour	Pier and harbour exteriors	
West Bay, Dorset	West Bay Holiday park	Caravan park (exteriors)	
West Bay, Dorset	Winn's Fun Fair	Broadchurch Fun Fair (exteriors and interiors)	
Clevedon, Somerset	The Avenue	Residential street scenes (exteriors)	
Clevedon, Somerset	Clevedon Pill	Various exteriors	
Clevedon, Somerset	Hill Road	Broadchurch High Street (exteriors)	
Clevedon, Somerset	House on Lavington Close	Latimer family home (exteriors and interiors)	
Clevedon, Somerset	Marshall Field	Field against the back of the Latimer and Miller homes	
Clevedon, Somerset	Seeley's Newsagent (disused)	Offices of the Broadchurch Echo (exteriors)	
Clevedon, Somerset	St Andrew's Church	St. Bede's Church and burying ground (exteriors and interiors)	
Clevedon, Somerset	Wain's Hill	Various exteriors	
Clevedon, Somerset	Walton Park Hotel	Traders Hotel (interiors)	
Weymouth, Dorset	Alexandra Gardens	Taxi rank confrontation (exteriors)	
Weymouth, Dorset	Esplanade	Various exteriors	
Weymouth, Dorset	The Lazy Lizard	Nightclub (interiors)	
Weymouth, Dorset	Riverside Restaurant	Not known	
Weymouth, Dorset	Weymouth Harbour	Pier and harbour scenes	
Weymouth, Dorset	Wynn's fun fair	Not known	
Bridport, Dorset	George Hotel	Not known	
Bridport, Dorset	Local roads	Various driving scenes	
Bridport, Dorset	Victoria Grove Street	Ellie Miller's home in Devon	
Reading, Berkshire	Munchees (café)	Not known	
Reading, Berkshire	Reading Young Offenders Institution (disused)	Wessex Prison	
Reading, Berkshire	Wild Lime (bar and restaurant)	Not known	
Exeter, Devon	The Forum Building, University of Exeter	Wessex Crown Court (exteriors and interiors)	
Exeter, Devon	The Forum Building, University of Exeter	Wessex Police Headquarters (exteriors and interiors)	
Eype, Dorset	Highlands End Holiday Park	Exteriors (shots overlooking beach)	
Eype, Dorset	Town centre	Not known (exteriors)	
Berkshire	Bracknell Forest	Forest scenes	
Bracknell, Berkshire	Bracknell shopping district	Christmas shopping scenes (exteriors)	
Charmouth, Dorset	Charmouth Beach	Beach scene with Olivia Colman and Eve Myles	
Isle of Portland, Dorset	House on West Cliff	Jocelyn Knight's home	
Jennett's Park, Berkshire	Jennett's Park shopping district	Not known	
Lynton, Devon	Valley of Rocks	Road where Ellie Miller makes a traffic stop	
Shepton Mallet, Somerset	Bowlish House Hotel	Traders Hotel (interiors)	

David Tennant took a break from filming the second series to shoot episodes of Broadchurch's American remake, Gracepoint. He returned to the Broadchurch series two production about 15 September 2014.

The production team was strongly criticised by the West Bay Coastguards in June 2014 for filming too close to the edge of East Cliff at West Bay. Severe weather and recent rockslides had left the cliffs unstable, and a Coastguard volunteer said the production team should have used stakes, safety lines, harnesses and helmets. A spokesperson for the Broadchurch production defended the film crew, noting that the production team received all necessary filming permits, visited the site numerous times to ensure safety, and took other reasonable health and safety precautions.

Filming for series two of Broadchurch concluded just before midnight on 12 October 2014. Final scenes were shot at the village of Eype.

==== Studio shooting and shooting schedule ====
Each episode of series two took about two and a half weeks to shoot.

Unlike the first series, series two contained a great deal of studio filming. Chibnall said this was because of the changed nature of the story, and he said that nearly all the major story moments in the second series occurred on a stage. David Tennant said that while the Jurassic Coast and several locations from series one are still featured in series two, most shooting occurred on studio sets near London.

Some sets were built at Longcross Studios in Longcross, Surrey, where art director John West built a very large set. (Note: The decision to film near London was apparently made before series one ended. According to Olivia Colman, the decision to shoot on soundstages near London was done to benefit those cast members whose families lived in the city.) Additional scenes were shot at North Light Film Studios in Armitage Bridge, West Yorkshire.

Two weeks were spent location filming at Britbank, the blue chalet in West Bay which doubled as Alec Hardy's new home in series two.

==== Acting ====
The casting of Rampling led to apprehension among many series two cast members, who were intimidated by her. But Chris Chibnall said that Rampling's humour (she's "a proper giggler") alleviated this immediately. Colman described Marianne Jean-Baptiste as "the coolest woman on the planet", and said that Eve Myles and Phoebe Waller-Bridge (a long-time friend of Colman's) both had a terrific sense of humour to the production.

Chibnall had particular praise for Olivia Colman's performance. "She's got such range, Olivia. ... She can do anything I throw at her — she's a writer's dream."

Actor Matthew Gravelle took his role as the alleged murderer and possible paedophile Joe Miller very seriously. "You don't want to get it wrong with whoever you're playing. You try to be as true to somebody who might actually be like that as possible," Gravelle said. "Whatever happens, he's still ultimately not a good person and you've got to try and be sympathetic towards him just to see it from his point of view." He did not research paedophilia per se, but tried to discover research on individuals with pre-paedophiliac tendencies. He found there was little scientific research in the area. Gravelle was therefore forced to come up with his own rationales for Joe's crimes. "The need to be loved was the root of it," he said. "Joe had love but he didn't have the attention in the way that he got it from Danny. It's probably an ego thing. ... He's not working. It's a self-worth issue." Forced to stay apart from the rest of the cast to prevent the public or press from suspecting his involvement in series two, Gravelle used his sense of isolation to bring his character to life. Gravelle said he found that the key to his character in series two was desperation. Joe Miller, he said, sought spiritual relief in both series one and two out of a desperate bid to feel better about himself and his crime. His not-guilty plea in series two, Gravelle felt, was also motivated by desperation (rather than a months-long plan to expose the town's secrets).

=== Music ===
Broadchurch: Original Music Composed By Ólafur Arnalds

Soundtrack album by Ólafur Arnalds
- Released: 19 January 2015
- Genres: Soundtrack; Ambient; Electronic
- Label: Mercury Classics

Icelandic musician and composer Ólafur Arnalds composed the music for Broadchurch series two, as he did for series one. Ólafur met with Chibnall and the other producers to discuss the score on 16 August 2014, and began work on the soundtrack the first week of September.

Ólafur tweeted via Twitter on 8 October that the series two soundtrack would have a much stronger percussion sound. He later said that he intended the heavy percussion and faster pace of the music to reflect the confusion and feeling of madness that the characters in series two feel. The musical sound was created using a string quartet, piano, drums and percussion instruments, synthesizer, electronic music, and recorded ambient sounds. The soundtrack differed from the music for the first series in another way as well. In the first series, musical themes could be identified for each character. As the music played, a viewer could anticipate what that character would do. Special musical clues even helped identify Joe Miller as Danny Latimer's murderer. But in series two, the music represents the town of Broadchurch as a whole. Doddi, a member of the musical quartet that performs with Ólafur in live shows, provided the percussion music and sounds for the new soundtrack, which (like the first series) was recorded with live musicians in an abandoned church in Reykjavík. Ólafur reported on 26 August that the opening episode involved a 10-minute-long sequence underscored with music. The composer finished writing the first musical cue for episode one on 10 October, and began recording the strings music for series two on 11 November. Music for the second episode of series two was delivered on 14 November 2014.

Ólafur tweeted on 13 November 2014 that he and longtime collaborator, singer Arnór Dan of the Icelandic band Agent Fresco, had written a new closing theme for each episode of series two. As of 11 January 2015, Ólafur was completing work on the music for episode seven, and had not yet finished composing for episode eight.

Ólafur's musical and sound contributions to Broadchurch series two have been highly praised. Show creator Chris Chibnall called Ólafur's soundtrack "a narrative all its own". Susanna Lazarus at Radio Times described the soundtrack as full of "ethereal vocals and haunting music". Alison Graham of Radio Times also had high praise for the soundtrack, saying, "The terrific music is important in building Broadchurch's chilly atmosphere and dark mood. Like the best music, it's unobtrusive and doesn't tell you what you should be feeling." Catherine Bolado in the Dorset Echo called it "Haunting, achingly beautiful, angry, harrowing, and joyous — the Broadchurch soundtrack is as emotionally charged as the show it is taken from."

A compilation of Ólafur's music from Broadchurch series one and two was released by Mercury Classics on 19 January 2015. The album contains 13 tracks, two of which (the songs "So Close" and "So Far") have a sung vocal component.

=== Post-production ===
The post-production process was a lengthy one. Actress Jodie Whittaker said that the cast would not be able to preview their performances before they aired on ITV in January.

Audio post-production was overseen by Sonorous, a company founded in 2013 by Howard Bargroff. Sound mixing was done using PMC Ltd.'s twotwo.6s nearfield studio monitors. (Note: "Nearfield" loudspeakers are those which are intended to be three times closer to the listener than the nearest hard surface. Nearfield listening reduces echo, and reduces the impact which poor room acoustics may have on sound.)

== Marketing ==
On 9 November 2014, two 20-second teaser trailers began airing on ITV, each titled "The End Is Where It Begins". On 16 November 2014, a third 20-second teaser trailer aired on ITV, in two versions, voiced by characters Alec Hardy and Ellie Miller, respectively. These were also titled "The End Is Where It Begins". Old Faces, a song written and performed by Laura Doggett, featured on the trailers.

A fourth series two trailer was released on 11 December, with ITV announcing a series two air date of 5 January 2015. ITV released only a small portion of the full trailer at first, and said it would release longer versions on YouTube as the hashtag #BroadchurchReturns was tweeted a certain number of times. (The network did not disclose the retweet goals it established.) ITV executive creative director Tony Pipes said the goal was to generate online buzz about series two.

Other marketing efforts included an 'above the line' online advertising campaign. This consisted primarily of a linear advertising campaign. (Note: Linear advertising is marketing which is straightforward and occurs during a specific time for a predetermined duration. This kind of advertising treats all consumers as the same, and does not seek to target subsegments of the population. Linear advertising does not change if it recurs.) ITV also said it would begin billboard advertising after Christmas 2014.

Another marketing component involved the publication of short stories after each episode airs. Chibnall was so enthused by author Erin Kelly's novelisation of Broadchurch series one that ITV contracted with her to write a short story to accompany each episode. The short stories, each to be published individually as an e-book, focus on a single character from series two.

== Reception ==
=== Critical reception ===
The premiere of Broadchurch series two met with a highly positive critical reception. The Independent awarded the premiere episode four stars out of five and labelled it "a brilliant demonstration of the risks a writer can get away with when there's a proven cast to fall back on". When questioning whether the series would be able to retain the quality of the previous series, reviewer Ellen E. Jones stated, "On the evidence of last night's twist-packed opener, perhaps even more so". Ben Lawrence in The Daily Telegraph also awarded the premiere episode 4/5, praising the performances of Tennant and Colman. They closed their review by stating "Broadchurch continues to be a rich and complex tapestry which respects the viewer's intelligence and commands you to become an armchair detective". Kevin O'Sullivan, writing for the Daily Mirror, called the first episode "tension-packed" and "an impressive opening salvo[] looks set to grip the nation all over again." He also singled out the "chilling Nordic noir-style music" for praise. Awarding the episode a full 5/5, Andrew Billen of The Times labelled the first episode "expansively told and imaginatively filmed". He also stated, "With an extraordinary ensemble cast that churns the narrative like waves in a harbour, Broadchurch will this time free us with nothing but the truth". Mark Lawson in The Guardian called the premiere episode "an ingeniously seamless reboot" and went on to say, "Chibnall has gathered enough old loose ends and intriguing new strands to suggest that Mondays may again become a bad night for the nation's pubs and restaurants". They also praised Tennant and Colman's performances, saying "the pleasure comes from Tennant and Colman's scenes together, forcing them together, each on the edge of disintegration". Natalie Corner at the Daily Mirror singled out Olivia Colman's acting, calling it "fantastic". The Independent's Neela Debnath called the cinematography "stunning".

Episodes two and three did not fare as well, critically. Discussing the second episode, Michael Hogan in The Daily Telegraph found the quickened pace invigorating, and found the story gripping. But Neela Debnath at The Independent criticised the writing, concluding, "Sadly, all the electric tension of episode one has evaporated, instead events are becoming improbable and additional drama seems to be shoehorned in for the sake of it. ... There's so much going on that it's starting to feel unbelievable." Ross McG at Metro largely agreed with these points, and noted that the courtroom drama seemed bland because it essentially reiterated facts viewers already knew. Ben Skipper at the International Business Times was harsh in his appraisal, calling episode two "Broadchurch's first truly bad hour of television." He blasted the plot, particularly the apparent kidnapping of Claire Ripley, the clichéd timing of Beth Latimer going into labour, and legal inconsistencies. He also called Marianne Jean-Baptiste's performance "lacking". There was limited praise for episode three, however. Ben Dowell at Radio Times had high praise for cinematographer John Conroy's work: "The cinematography was beautiful. Broadchurch always looks fabulously bucolic but tonight the lovely summer dawns and countryside was shown off to an even greater degree..." He also lauded Olivia Colman's performance, calling her "once again on top form".

Episodes four, five and six received more positive reviews. The Guardian said episode five was better than its predecessor, saying "everything felt a little less crammed in." Discussing the sixth episode, The Telegraph declared the show "back on form" and ultimately awarded it four out of five stars. The Independent also reacted more warmly to this episode, stating "All told Broadchurch is rumbling along with the help of some good one-liners and an excellent cast". Digital Spy heavily praised episode six, claiming that "the various threads seem to be coming together as each character makes their mark. Decisions have been made, revelations have come to light and Broadchurch remains as gripping and as fascinating as ever".

Episode seven also received positive reviews. The Independent stated that "the stakes are high just in time for next week's finale". Radio Times believed that "next week's finale really will be worth waiting for" and praised the episode's cinematography by stating "The court scenes came into their own, with beautiful sweeping shots of all the protagonists and bewigged drama that was not weighed down by ponderous and unconvincing legal wrangling".

Episode eight ended the series with a generally positive critical reception, with many praising the performances of Tennant and Colman. Radio Times praised Tennant's performance, saying that "the episode belonged to [him]". They also heavily praised the ending to the Joe Miller case, labeling the resolution "brilliant" and claiming "Yes, he got off, but writer Chris Chibnall and his fabulous cast fashioned a quite brilliant climax where justice of a sort was done". Digital Spy responded positively, labeling the finale "satisfying and unsatisfying - complete closure has not been achieved. Reflecting the inequality and injustices of everyday life, Chibnall's choices for the finale were thoughtful, saddening and even worrying. A brave move, just as the entire two series have been". They also praised Tennant's performance, they said "It's a cracking performance from the actor who delves deep to deliver some fiery moments but also, having solved the Sandbrook case, his own breakdown at the station - as he sits alone and cries - is touching and deserved". The Independent, in a mixed review, praised many of the cast by saying "Whenever the plot dragged, we could rely on Ellie (Olivia Colman), Beth (Jodie Whittaker) or Mark (Andrew Buchan) for a performance which delivered that missing emotional connection".

==== Effect on tourism ====
National news media also identified a phenomenon known as the "Broadchurch effect", a surge of interest in real estate and tourism in areas where Broadchurch was filmed. The Bridport area saw tourism leap 67 per cent after series one ended. After the debut of series two, The Independent reported that major Web search engines saw a 200 per cent increase in searches for Dorset and Somerset. Searches for holidays in Dorset rose 50 per cent, according to a study by the hotel booking web site Hotels.com. When Britbank, the blue chalet in West Bank, went on the market in January 2015 for £275,000, real estate expert Malcolm Gill said the price had gone up £25,000 to £50,000 because of the "Broadchurch effect".

=== Ratings ===
The premiere episode of series two drew an average of 7.3 million viewers for a 30.1 per cent share on 5 January 2015. An average of 300,000 viewers watched it on ITV+1 an hour later. The episode opened with just 6.8 million viewers at 9 P.M., and ended with 8.7 million viewers (with a peak viewership of 8.9 million). Broadchurch was the second-most-watched programme of the evening, with the most-watched being Coronation Street (which had a peak audience of 8.3 million). After accounting for DVR and other viewers over the next seven days, the first episode's consolidated viewership figure was 9.9 million. The series two premiere drew 800,000 (28.1 per cent) more viewers than the series one premiere, and was 22.6 per cent higher than average ITV viewership (5.2 million) in the same time-slot over the past 12 months.

Viewership dropped significantly for the second episode, to just 6.11 million viewers (a 22.4 per cent share) after accounting for ITV+1 viewership. That was the lowest overnight viewership rating for the series since episode five of series one. It was still good enough to win its timeslot, however. Overnight ratings dropped again for the third episode to just 5.2 million viewers, the lowest for any episode of the series. Overnight viewership dropped again for episode four, reaching a low of 5.6 million viewers. However, the series won its timeslot, beating Silent Witness.

Summary of episode ratings
Episode	Date	Official ITV rating (millions)	ITV Weekly rank ^1	Share (%)	Official ITV HD rating (millions)	Official ITV +1 rating (millions)	Total ITV viewers (millions)
Episode 1	5 January 2015	8.99	1	30.1	1.87	0.48	11.34
Episode 2	12 January 2015	7.29	6	24.7	1.78	0.81	9.88
Episode 3	19 January 2015	6.70	7	22.7	1.70	0.87	9.27
Episode 4	26 January 2015	6.75	6	22.9	1.70	0.75	9.20
Episode 5	2 February 2015	6.43	9	21.9	1.63	0.85	8.91
Episode 6	9 February 2015	6.84	5	25.9	1.98	0.51	9.33
Episode 7	16 February 2015	6.98	4	23.9	1.81	0.54	9.33
Episode 8	23 February 2015	7.66	2	32.7	2.13	0.38	10.17
Series average	2015	7.21	5	25.6	1.83	0.65	9.68

== Home media releases ==
Acorn Media UK announced it would release series two on DVD and Blu-ray in the United Kingdom on 23 March 2015.

== Bibliography ==
- Hackley, Christopher E. (2005). Advertising and Promotion: Communicating Brands. Thousand Oaks, Calif.: SAGE Publications. ISBN 0761941533.
- Rose, Jay (2014). Audio Postproduction for Film and Video. New York: CRC Press. ISBN 9781136061189.
