= Eric Lomax =

British Army officer (1919–2012)

- Born: Eric Sutherland Lomax; 30 May 1919; Edinburgh, Scotland
- Died: 8 October 2012 (aged 93); Berwick-upon-Tweed, England
- Occupations: Military officer, author
- Known for: The Railway Man
- Spouse(s): Agnes Scott Dickson (m. 1945; div. 1982) Patti Wallace (m. 1983)
- Children: 3

Eric Sutherland Lomax (30 May 1919 – 8 October 2012) was a British Army officer who was sent to a Japanese prisoner-of-war camp in 1942. He is most notable for his book, The Railway Man, about his experiences before, during, and after World War II, which won the 1996 NCR Book Award and the PEN/Ackerley Prize.

== Early life ==
Lomax was born in Edinburgh on 30 May 1919, son of John Lomax, of 11, Bedford Terrace, Portobello, Edinburgh, a Civil Service clerk and General Post Office manager, and Elizabeth, née Sutherland. He left the Royal High School, Edinburgh, aged 16, after entering a civil service competition and obtaining employment at the Post Office. On 8 April 1936, he became a sorting clerk and telegraphist in Edinburgh. On 10 March 1937, he was promoted to the clerical class.

== Military service ==
In 1939, aged 20, Lomax joined the Royal Corps of Signals before World War II broke out. Following time in the 152nd Officer Cadet Training Unit, he was commissioned as a second lieutenant on 28 December 1940. He was given the service number 165340. He was a Royal Signals officer attached to the 5th Field Regiment, Royal Artillery.

As a lieutenant, he was captured by the Japanese following the surrender of Singapore in February 1942. He, along with the other Far East prisoners of war (FEPOW), undertook a forced march to Changi Prison. He was then taken to Kanchanaburi, Thailand and forced to build the Burma Railway. In 1943 he and five other prisoners were tortured by the Kempeitai and convicted of "anti-Japanese activities" after a clandestine radio was found in the camp. He was transferred to Outram Road Prison in Singapore for the remainder of the war.

On 12 September 1946, it was gazetted that he had been mentioned in despatches "in recognition of gallant and distinguished services while [a Prisoner] of War". He was awarded the Efficiency Medal (Militia) in 1949 and was granted the honorary rank of captain. He retired from the Army in 1949.

== Later life and death ==
Unable to adjust to civilian life, Lomax joined the Colonial Service and was posted to the Gold Coast (now Ghana) until 1955. After studying management he worked for the Scottish Gas Board and the University of Strathclyde. He retired in 1982.

Lomax was the first patient of the Medical Foundation for the Care of Victims of Torture. His later life included reconciliation with one of his former torturers, interpreter Takashi Nagase of Kurashiki, Japan. Nagase had written a book on his own experiences during and after the war entitled Crosses and Tigers, and financed a Buddhist temple at the bridge to atone for his actions during the war. The meeting between the two men was filmed as a documentary Enemy, My Friend? (1995), directed by Mike Finlason. The film received several awards.

Lomax's death, at the age of 93, was announced by the BBC on 8 October 2012. He died in Berwick-upon-Tweed, Northumberland.

== Personal life ==
A keen railway enthusiast and transport photographer, Lomax joined the Stephenson Locomotive Society in 1937, and his enthusiasm for railways stayed with him to his death.

He married his first wife Agnes Scott Dickson ("Nan") on 20 November 1945, just three weeks after being liberated. They had three children, Linda May (14 December 1946 – 13 December 1993), Eric (18 June 1948) and Charmaine Carole (born 17 June 1957).

In 1980, Lomax met British-born Canadian nurse Patricia "Patti" Wallace who was 17 years his junior. She moved from Canada to the United Kingdom in 1982. Lomax left Nan several months later and married Patti in 1983.

== Autobiography and film ==
Lomax's autobiography The Railway Man was published in 1995. John McCarthy, a journalist who was held hostage for five years in Lebanon, described Lomax's book as "an extraordinary story of torture and reconciliation."

Lomax's story was made into the BBC television drama Prisoners in Time in 1995, starring John Hurt as Lomax, Randall Duk Kim as Nagase, and Rowena Cooper as Patti.

A film adaptation was released in 2013. Directed by Jonathan Teplitzky, the film stars Colin Firth and Jeremy Irvine as the older and younger Eric Lomax respectively, and Nicole Kidman as Patti, the woman who befriended and later married Lomax. The film moves between Lomax's time as a FEPOW on the Burma Railway and his later life around the time of his reconciliation with his captor.

== Other ==
He was a council member of The Freedom Association.

== Works ==
- The Railway Man (ISBN 0-09-958231-7)
