= The Windmill Massacre =

- Film poster
- Directed by: Nick Jongerius
- Written by: Nick Jongerius; Suzy Quid; Chris W. Mitchell
- Produced by: Daniel Koefoed; Nick Jongerius
- Starring: Charlotte Beaumont; Bart Klever; Patrick Baladi; Ben Batt; Fiona Hampton; Tanroh Ishida; Adam Thomas Wright; Noah Taylor
- Cinematography: Bart Beekman
- Edited by: Jeffrey De Vore
- Production companies: Pellicola; ETA Films; Global Film Partners
- Distributed by: XLrator Media
- Release date: August 29, 2016 (London FrightFest Film Festival)
- Running time: 85 minutes
- Country: Netherlands
- Language: English
- Box office: $90,634

The Windmill Massacre, known as The Windmill in the US, is a 2016 English-language Dutch slasher film directed by Nick Jongerius. Charlotte Beaumont stars as an Australian fugitive in the Netherlands who joins a tour group to escape extradition. After their bus breaks down by a windmill reputed to be haunted by an avenging demon, the tourists begin mysteriously dying. It premiered at the London FrightFest Film Festival in August 2016 and received a limited theatrical release in the US in October.

== Plot ==
After fleeing Australia, Jennifer takes a job as a nanny in the Netherlands. Her employer eventually discovers her true identity and that she is a fugitive. Looking for a way to quickly leave Amsterdam, she attempts to bluff her way onto a tour bus. Abe, the driver, allows her to board without a ticket, joking that "there's always room for another sinner". The other tourists include British businessman Douglas and his son, Curt; Jackson, a British soldier who accidentally killed a prostitute prior to boarding; Ruby, a French photographer sent to take pictures of windmills; Takashi, a university student who speaks only Japanese; and Nicholas, a troubled British physician.

Takashi recognizes Ruby as a promotional model who starred in a popular Japanese advertising campaign. Responding to him in Japanese, Ruby downplays her fame and asks him not to cause a scene. Jennifer drops a pill bottle, and Nicholas hands it back to her after examining the label. After seeing her dead father standing in the road, Jennifer claims the bus has struck a man. The other passengers become annoyed when she insists on checking, and the situation only worsens when Abe cannot restart the bus. Abe suggests they wait for help to arrive, but Jackson and Jennifer leave to investigate a nearby windmill. After having flashbacks of killing the prostitute, Jackson is suddenly maimed by a scythe-wielding demon. Jennifer flees as the demon kills Jackson.

The other tourists do not believe her, and Nicholas points out that the bottle she dropped earlier was for an anti-psychotic. Jennifer angrily denies being crazy. The others attempt to calm her but do not believe her story about a demon. As they argue, the bus wobbles precariously. As they disembark, Jennifer accidentally injures Curt. Douglas announces that his son is a haemophiliac and accuses Jennifer of causing all their problems. Abe leads them to an abandoned cabin and, over Jennifer's objections, leaves to seek help from a miller. Takashi wanders off alone and, after seeing a ghostly apparition of his beloved grandmother, expresses remorse for abandoning her.

After returning, Abe finds an ancient document that says a local Devil-worshipping miller became an avenging demon after he was burned alive. Each of the tourists find personal items in the cabin that remind them of dark secrets, and they experience nightmares or flashbacks. Jennifer is revealed to have unintentionally caused her younger brother's death while killing their abusive father. After treating Curt, Nicholas wanders outside, where he denounces a silent, ghostly patient for ruining his career. Nicholas was drunk while operating on her and caused her death. Takashi returns to the others, witnessing the demon as it kills Nicholas. The others at first blame Jennifer for Nicholas' death. Takashi says, through Ruby's translation, that the demon spared him because of his remorse.

As the others come to believe Jennifer, they admit their sins: Ruby says she hired a yakuza to disfigure a rival model in Japan, and Douglas admits to killing his wife. Ruby drowns after admiring her reflection in a pool of water, and the demonic miller decapitates Douglas. Revealing himself as the miller's assistant, Abe kills Takashi because the miller cannot kill innocents or remorseful people. Abe lures Curt and Jennifer back to the windmill under the pretense of helping them to set it on fire. Jennifer expresses no regret for killing her abusive father, and the miller attacks her. She is saved when Curt escapes Abe and sets the windmill on fire. As the miller disappears, Jennifer remembers her dead brother and risks her life to rescue Curt, slashing Abe's neck.

Abe survives his wound by using bone meal from the mill to staunch the bleeding. As he taunts Jennifer, telling her she cannot escape her fate, the miller reappears and kills her in front of Curt. Later, Abe picks up another bus load of tourists. When one of them cannot pay, Abe allows him on the bus, repeating the same line from earlier.

== Cast ==
- Charlotte Beaumont as Jennifer. The character was made Australian to emphasize that she has run a great distance to escape her past. Beaumont, a British citizen, studied Australian accents and used Taylor's input to help guide her performance.
- Bart Klever as Abe
- Patrick Baladi as Douglas
- Ben Batt as Jackson
- Fiona Hampton as Ruby
- Tanroh Ishida as Takashi
- Adam Thomas Wright as Curt
- Noah Taylor as Nicholas
- Kenan Raven as Miller Hendrik

== Production ==
Nick Jongerius grew up near a windmill and said he always found them creepy. The film was based on a concept trailer that proved popular on YouTube. Once he had funding, however, Jongerius rethought many of the themes and changed their focus. Jongerius cited Brian De Palma as an influence on his filmmaking, though he said he did not realize the extent of the influence until after completing The Windmill Massacre. Other influences were Amicus Productions horror films and Agatha Christie.

== Release ==
The Windmill Massacre premiered at the London FrightFest Film Festival on 29 August 2016. XLrator Media released it via video on demand on 25 August and gave it a limited theatrical release in the US on 28 October 2016. It grossed $90,634 internationally.

== Reception ==
Rotten Tomatoes, a review aggregator, reports that 44% of nine surveyed critics gave the film a positive review; the average rating is 5.5/10. Though praising the premise, Justin Lowe of The Hollywood Reporter wrote the film "never manages to connect the high concept with effective characterization". Maitland McDonagh of Film Journal International called it "formulaic stuff" besides the location and focus on windmills. Writing for the Los Angeles Times, Noel Murray called it "an unusually slick and well-acted slasher picture" whose professionalism makes up for its lack of originality. Rob Staeger of L.A. Weekly, in comparing it negatively to The Abominable Dr. Phibes, wrote that it focuses too much on the slasher villain and not enough on the questions raised about grace and repentance. Dread Central's Matt Boiselle rated it 3.5/5 stars and wrote, "Jongerius keeps the template simplistic, ferocious, and absorbing to those who like a lot of slaughter with their tour-information videos – recommended."
