= Peter Hennessy =

English historian and academic

The Right Honourable The Lord Hennessy of Nympsfield KG FBA
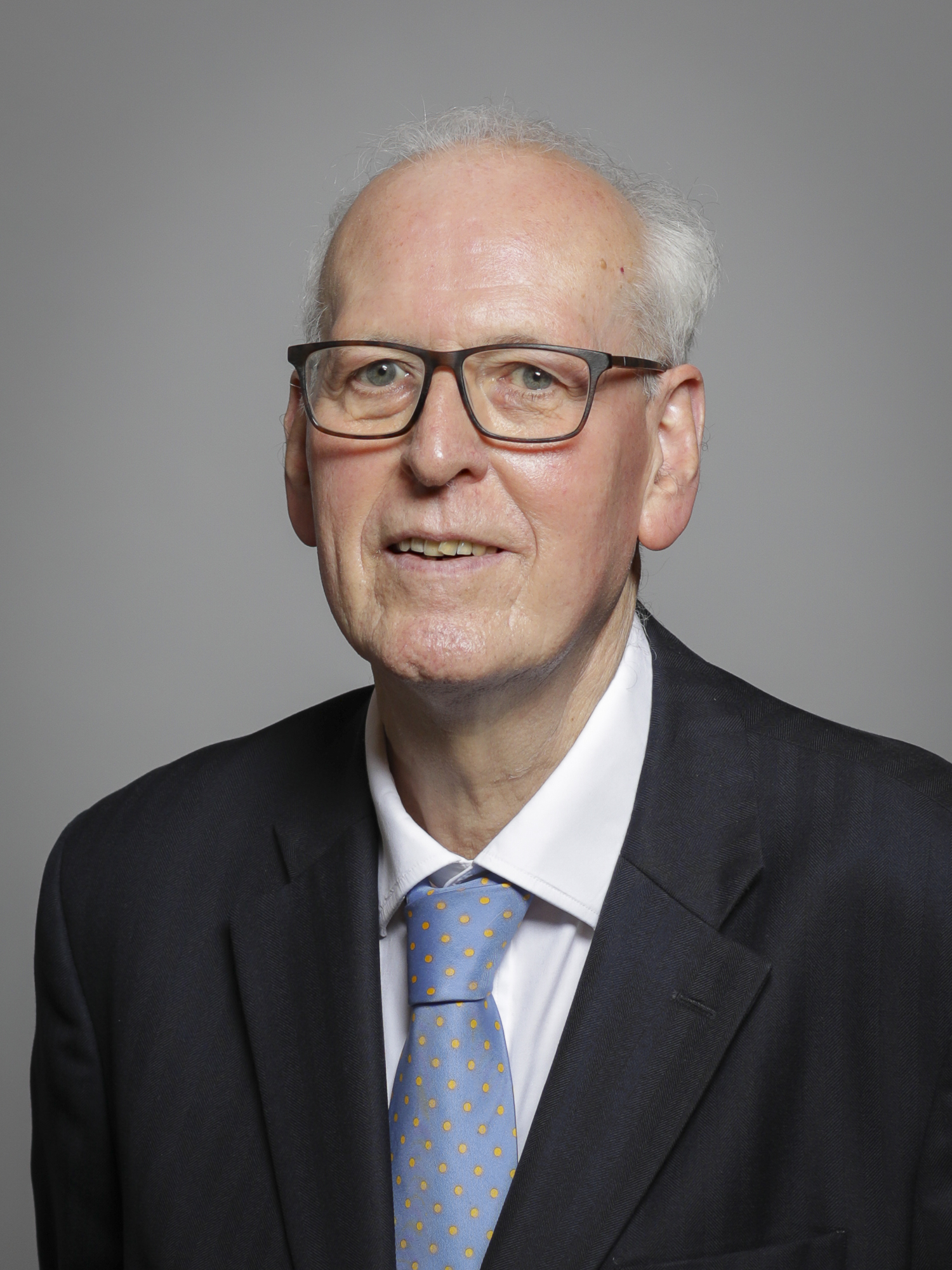
- Peter Hennessy in 2019

Member of the House of Lords
- Lord Temporal
- Life peerage 8 November 2010 – 25 June 2026

Personal details
- Born: 28 March 1947 (age 79) Edmonton, London
- Party: None (crossbencher)
- Children: 2
- Education: St Benedict's School, Ealing; Marling School
- Alma mater: St John's College, Cambridge
- Occupation: Historian and academic; formerly journalist
- Title: Attlee Professor of Contemporary British History
- Awards: Duff Cooper Prize (1992); NCR Book Award (1993); Orwell Prize (2007)

Academic work
- Discipline: Historian
- Sub-discipline: British history; Contemporary history
- Institutions: Institute of Contemporary British History; Queen Mary and Westfield College, University of London
- Doctoral students: Simon Case

Peter John Hennessy, Baron Hennessy of Nympsfield, KG, FBA (born 28 March 1947) is an English historian and academic specialising in the history of government. Since 1992, he has been Attlee Professor of Contemporary British History at Queen Mary University of London. In 2026, he was appointed a Knight Companion of the Order of the Garter by King Charles III.

== Early life ==
Hennessy was born in Edmonton, north London, son of William Gerald Hennessy and Edith, née Wood-Johnson. He comes from a large Catholic family of Irish provenance. He was brought up in large houses requisitioned by the local council, first in Allandale Avenue and then in Lyndhurst Gardens, Finchley, north London.

He attended the nearby Our Lady of Lourdes Primary School, and on Sundays he went to St Mary Magdalene Church, where he was an altar boy. He was the subject of the first episode, first broadcast on 6 August 2007, of the BBC Radio 4 series The House I Grew Up In, in which he talked about his childhood.

Hennessy was educated at St Benedict's School and then at a grammar school in Ealing, west London. After his father's job led the family to move to the Cotswolds, he attended Marling School, a grammar school in Stroud, Gloucestershire. He went on to study at St John's College, Cambridge, where he was awarded a BA degree in 1969 and a PhD degree in 1990. Hennessy was a Kennedy Memorial Scholar at Harvard University from 1971 to 1972.

== Career ==
=== Journalism ===
Hennessy was a journalist for the Times Higher Education Supplement from 1972 to 1974. From 1974 to 1982, he wrote leaders for The Times, for which he was also the Whitehall correspondent. He was The Financial Times' lobby correspondent at Westminster in 1976. In June 1977, Hennessy accused Donald Beves of being the "fourth man" in the Cambridge Spy Ring (then-known participants were Philby, Burgess, and Maclean), but Geoffrey Grigson and others quickly leapt to the defense of Beves, considering him uninterested in politics.

Hennessy wrote for The Economist in 1982. He was a regular presenter of Analysis on BBC Radio 4 from 1987 to 1992. On 17 November 2005, he made a trenchant appearance alongside Lord Wilson of Dinton before the House of Commons Public Administration Select Committee on the publication of political memoirs.

In July and August 2013, he was the interviewer for BBC Radio 4's Reflections, a series of four biographical interview programmes featuring Shirley Williams, Jack Straw, Norman Tebbit and Neil Kinnock. Hennessy continued to present the programme until 2019.

On 17 April 2022, he was interviewed by BBC Radio 4's Broadcasting House. On the subject of the Metropolitan Police fines issued to Boris Johnson for lockdown breaches during the Partygate scandal, he said "I think we're in the most severe constitutional crisis involving a prime minister that I can remember."

=== Academic career ===
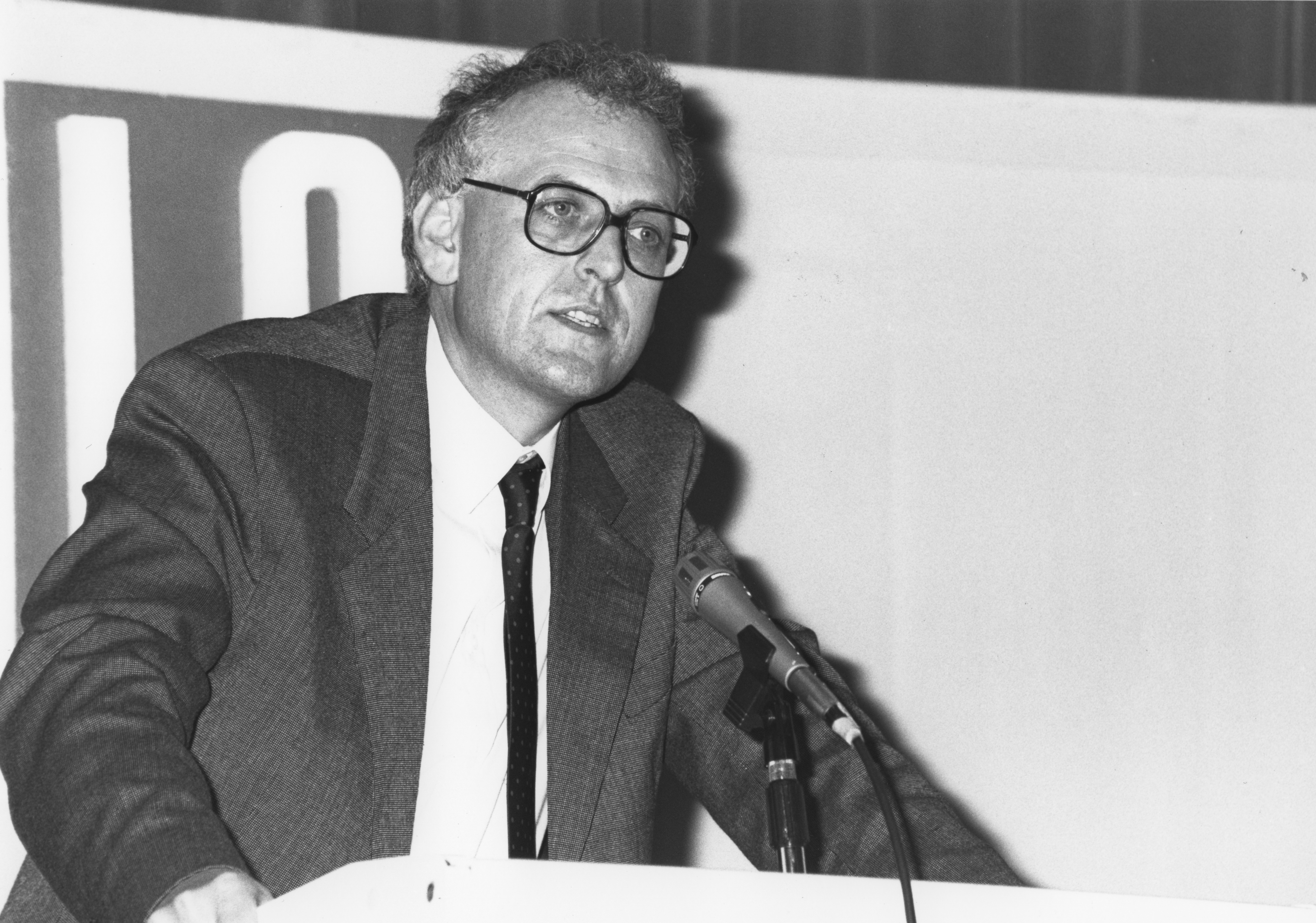
Professor Hennessy giving a public lecture at LSE in 1989

Hennessy co-founded the Institute of Contemporary British History in 1986. From 1992 to 2000, he was Professor of Contemporary History at Queen Mary and Westfield College, University of London. From 1994 to 1997, he gave public lectures as Professor of Rhetoric at Gresham College, London. From 2001, he has been Attlee professor of contemporary British history at Queen Mary, University of London.

His analysis of post-war Britain, Never Again: Britain 1945–1951, won the Duff Cooper Prize in 1992 and the NCR Book Award in 1993.

His study of Britain in the 1950s and the rise of Harold Macmillan, Having It So Good: Britain in the 1950s, won the 2007 Orwell Prize for political writing.

== Elevation to the peerage ==
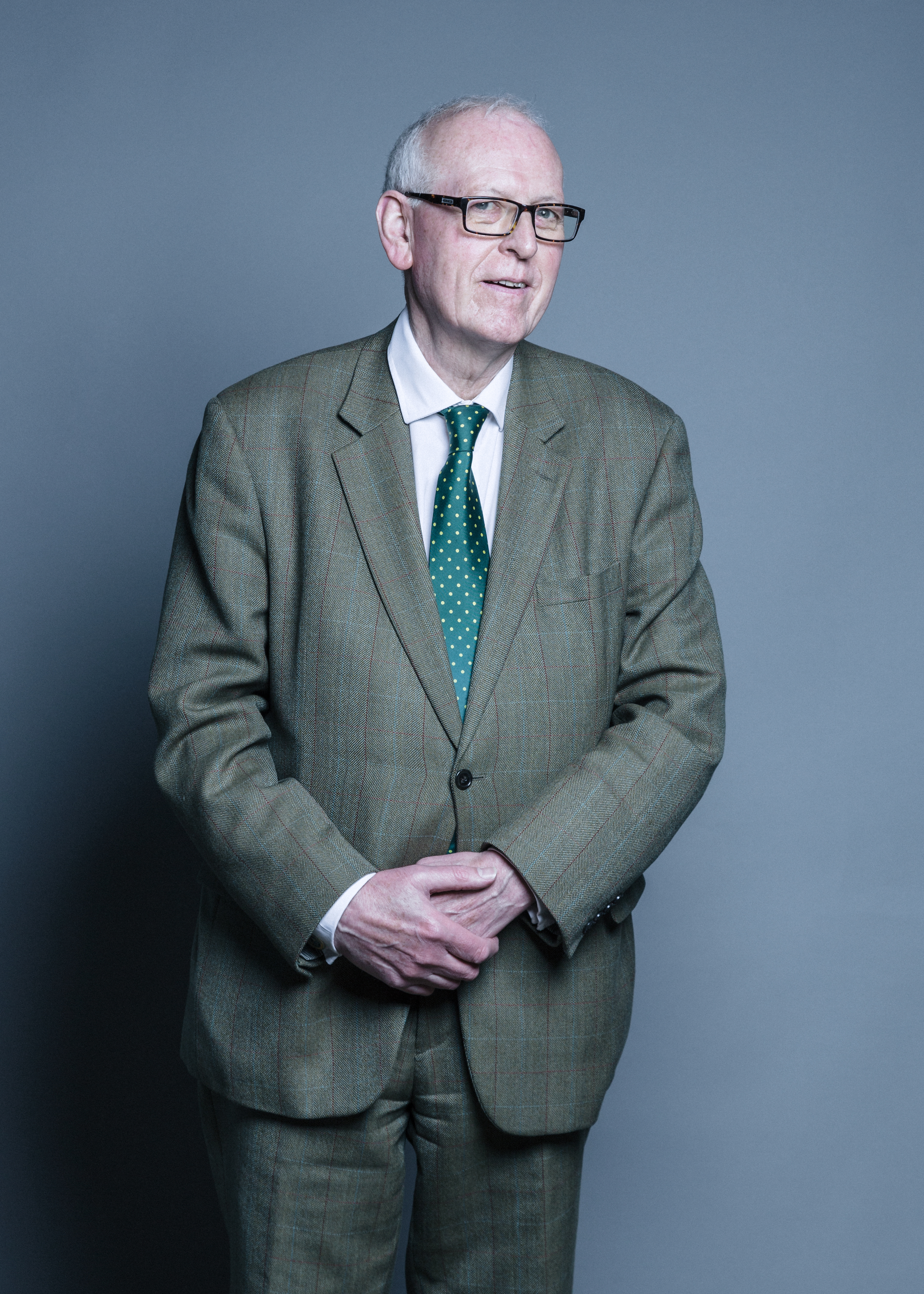
Lord Hennessy of Nympsfield in 2018

On 5 October 2010, the House of Lords Appointments Commission said that Hennessy was to be a crossbench peer. He was created a life peer on 8 November 2010, taking the title Baron Hennessy of Nympsfield, of Nympsfield in the County of Gloucestershire. He was introduced to the House of Lords on 25 November.

"I'm terribly pleased and honoured," Hennessy said at hearing the news. "I hope I can help the House of Lords a bit on constitutional matters. I'll certainly give it my best shot." In August 2014, Hennessy was one of 200 public figures who were signatories to a letter to The Guardian opposing Scottish independence in the run-up to September's referendum.

He retired from the House of Lords on 25 June 2026, having made his valedictory speech during debate on the King's Speech during the State Opening of Parliament. Coincidentally, his speech followed the maiden speech of Simon Case, Baron Case, a former PhD student of Hennessy.

== Personal life ==
Hennessy is married with two daughters. He lives in London with his wife Enid. In September 2019, he stated in an interview that he had early-stage Parkinson's disease.

On 7 May 2023, Hennessy was the guest for BBC Radio 4's Desert Island Discs.

== Bibliography ==
External videos
- Booknotes interview with Hennessy on Whitehall, 26 November 1989, C-SPAN

Hennessy is the author of numerous articles and of the following books:

- Cabinet (1986) ISBN 0-631-14968-6 Blackwell
- Whitehall (1989) ISBN 978-0-43619-271-5 Secker & Warburg (revised & extended in 2001)
- Never Again: Britain 1945–51 (1992) ISBN 978-0-22402-768-7 Jonathan Cape (revised & updated in 2006)
- Pathways to the Pigeon Hole?: The Effectiveness of Official Inquiries (1993) University of Strathclyde
- The Hidden Wiring: Unearthing the British Constitution (1995) ISBN 0-575-06176-6 Gollancz
- Ready, Steady, Go!: New Labour and Whitehall ISBN 9780716340379 (1997) Fabian Society
- The Blair Centre: A Question of Command and Control? ISBN 9781898531531 (1999) Public Management Foundation
- The Prime Minister: The Office and Its Holders since 1945 (2000) ISBN 9780713993400 Allen Lane
- The Secret State: Whitehall and the Cold War (2002) ISBN 0-7139-9626-9 Allen Lane (republished & extended in 2010, see below)
- Rulers and Servants of the State: The Blair Style of Government, 1997-2004 (2004) ISBN 9781898531906 Office for Public Management
- Having It So Good: Britain in the Fifties (2006) ISBN 978-0-7139-9571-8 Allen Lane
- Cabinets and the Bomb (2007) ISBN 978-0-19-726422-5 Oxford University Press
- The New Protective State: Government, Intelligence and Terrorism (2007) ISBN 9780826496140 Continuum
- The Secret State: Preparing For The Worst 1945–2010 (2010) ISBN 978-0-14-104469-9 Penguin
- Distilling the Frenzy: Writing the History of One's Own Times (2012) ISBN 9781849542159 Biteback
- Establishment and Meritocracy (2014) ISBN 9781908323774 Haus Publishing
- Kingdom to Come: Thoughts on the Union Before and After the Scottish Referendum (2015) ISBN 9781910376065 Haus Publishing
- Reflections: Conversations with Politicians (2016) ISBN 9781910376485 Haus Publishing (expanded & reissued in 2020, see below)
- The Silent Deep: The Royal Navy Submarine Service Since 1945 (2015) with James Jinks ISBN 9781846145803 Allen Lane
- Winds of Change: Britain in the Early Sixties (2019) ISBN 978-1846141102 Allen Lane
- The Complete Reflections: Conversations with Politicians (2020) ISBN 9781912208982 Haus Publishing
- A Duty of Care: Britain Before and After Corona (2022) ISBN 9780241491942 Penguin
- The Bonfire of the Decencies: Repairing and Restoring the British Constitution (2022) ISBN 9781913368715 Haus Publishing
- On the Back of an Envelope: A Life in Writing (2024) ISBN 9781913368852 Haus Publishing (with Polly Coupar-Hennessy)

Coat of arms of Peter Hennessy
Crest A worker bee statant Or holding in the dexter foreclaws an open fountain pen bendwise sinister nib downwards Proper. Escutcheon Azure on a chevron engrailed between three closed books clasped Or a chevronel Gules. Supporters On either side a worker bee Or holding in the interior foreclaws an open fountain pen that on the dexter bendwise and on the sinister bendwise sinister nibs downwards Proper.

== See also ==
- Gresham Professor of Rhetoric
- Good Chap Theory

== Sources ==
- 'Corrected Oral Transcript of Oral Evidence presented to the House of Commons Public Administration Select Committee on the publication of political memoirs on 17 November 2005 by Lord Wilson of Dinton and Professor Peter Hennessy', 7 December 2005. Retrieved 31 December 2005

Orders of precedence in the United Kingdom
Preceded by The Lord Monks	Gentlemen; Baron Hennessy of Nympsfield	Followed by The Lord Green of Hurstpierpoint
