= The Railway Man (film) =

- Theatrical release poster
- Directed by: Jonathan Teplitzky
- Screenplay by: Frank Cottrell Boyce; Andy Paterson
- Based on: The Railway Man by Eric Lomax
- Produced by: Chris Brown; Bill Curbishley; Andy Paterson
- Starring: Colin Firth; Nicole Kidman; Jeremy Irvine; Stellan Skarsgård; Sam Reid; Hiroyuki Sanada
- Cinematography: Garry Phillips
- Edited by: Martin Connor
- Music by: David Hirschfelder
- Production companies: Screen Queensland; Screen Australia; Silver Reel; Creative Scotland; Screen NSW; Lionsgate UK; Pictures in Paradise; Trinifold Entertainment; Davis Films; Latitude Media; Archer Street Productions; Thai Occidental Productions
- Distributed by: Paramount Pictures and Transmission Films (Australia); Lionsgate UK (United Kingdom); Ascot Elite Entertainment Group (Switzerland); Metropolitan Filmexport (France)
- Release dates: 6 September 2013 (TIFF); 26 December 2013 (Australia); 10 January 2014 (United Kingdom)
- Running time: 116 minutes
- Countries: Australia; Switzerland; France; United Kingdom
- Language: English
- Budget: $18 million
- Box office: $22.3 million

The Railway Man is a 2013 war film directed by Jonathan Teplitzky. It is an adaptation of the 1995 autobiography of the same name by Eric Lomax, and stars Colin Firth, Nicole Kidman, Jeremy Irvine, and Stellan Skarsgård. It premiered at the 2013 Toronto International Film Festival on 6 September 2013.

== Plot ==
During the Second World War, Eric Lomax is a British officer who is captured by the Japanese in Singapore and sent to a Japanese POW camp, where he is forced to work on the Thai-Burma Railway north of the Malay Peninsula. During his time in the camp as one of the Far East prisoners of war, Lomax is tortured by the Kempeitai (military secret police) for building a radio receiver from spare parts. The torture depicted includes beatings, food deprivation and waterboarding. Apparently, he had fallen under suspicion of being a spy, for supposedly using the British news broadcast receiver as a transmitter of military intelligence. In fact, however, his only intention had been to use the device as a morale booster for himself and his fellow prisoner-slaves. Lomax and his surviving comrades are finally rescued by the British Army.

Thirty years later, Lomax is still suffering the psychological trauma of his wartime experiences, though strongly supported by his wife, Patricia, whom he had met on one of his many train excursions, a true railway enthusiast. His best friend and fellow ex-POW Finlay brings him evidence that one of their captors, an interpreter for the Japanese secret police Takashi Nagase, is now working as a tourist guide in the very camp where he interpreted for the Kempetai as they tortured British POWs. Before Lomax can act on this information, Finlay, unable to handle his memories of his experiences, commits suicide by hanging himself from a bridge. Lomax travels alone to Thailand and returns to the scene of his torture to confront Nagase “in an attempt to let go of a lifetime of bitterness and hate”. When he finally confronts his former captor, Lomax first questions him in the same way Nagase and his men had interrogated him years before.

The situation builds up to the point where Lomax prepares to smash Nagase's arm, using a club and a clamp designed by the Japanese for that purpose and now used as war exhibits. Out of guilt, Nagase does not resist, but Lomax redirects the blow at the last moment. Lomax threatens to cut Nagase's throat and finally pushes him into a bamboo cage, of the kind in which Lomax and many other POWs had been placed as punishment. Nagase soon reveals that the Japanese (including himself) were brainwashed into thinking the war would be a victorious one for them, and that he never knew about the high casualties caused by the Imperial Japanese Army. Lomax finally frees Nagase, throws his knife into the nearby river and returns to Britain.

After receiving a heartfelt letter from Nagase confessing his feelings of guilt, Lomax returns, with Patricia, to Thailand. He meets Nagase once again, and in an emotional scene the two accept each other's apologies and embrace. The epilogue relates that Nagase and Eric remained friends until Nagase's death in 2011 and Eric's one year later.

== Cast ==
- Colin Firth as Eric Lomax
  - Jeremy Irvine as Young Eric Lomax
- Nicole Kidman as Patricia Lomax (née Wallace)
- Stellan Skarsgård as Finlay
  - Sam Reid as Young Finlay
- Hiroyuki Sanada as Takashi Nagase
  - Tanroh Ishida as Young Takashi Nagase
- Ewen Leslie as Thompson

== Production ==
While he was working on the screenplay, co-writer Frank Cottrell Boyce travelled to Berwick-upon-Tweed in Northumberland with Firth to meet 91-year-old Lomax. Firth said of the film: "I think what is not often addressed is the effect over time. We do sometimes see stories about what it's like coming home from war, we very rarely see stories about what it's like decades later. This is not just a portrait of suffering. It's about relationships ... how that damage interacts with intimate relationships, with love."

Rachel Weisz was originally to play Patricia, but had to drop out due to scheduling conflicts with re-shoots for other films.

Shooting began in April 2012 in Edinburgh, Perth, Berwick-upon-Tweed and North Berwick in East Lothian and St Monans in Fife, and later in Thailand and Ipswich, Queensland, Australia.

== Reception ==
=== Box office ===
The film grossed $4,415,429 in the US, and $17,882,455 internationally, for a combined gross of $22,297,884.

=== Critical response ===
On Rotten Tomatoes, a review aggregator, the film has a 67% approval rating based on 128 reviews, with an average rating of 6.4/10. The consensus reads: "Understated to a fault, The Railway Man transcends its occasionally stodgy pacing with a touching, fact-based story and the quiet chemistry of its stars." At Metacritic, the film received a score of 59/100 based on 33 reviews, indicating "mixed or average reviews".

Kidman, Firth, and Irvine were all praised for their roles. Katherine Monk of the Montreal Gazette said of Kidman: "It's a truly masterful piece of acting that transcends Teplitzky's store-bought framing, but it's Kidman who delivers the biggest surprise: For the first time since her eyebrows turned into solid marble arches, the Australian Oscar winner is truly terrific", and finished with: "Coupled with some dowdy clothes and a keen ear for accents, Kidman is a very believable middle-aged survivor who will not surrender to melodrama or abandonment". Ken Korman, who agreed with that assessment, stated: "Kidman finds herself playing an unabashedly middle-aged character. She rises to the occasion with a deep appreciation of her character's own emotional trauma." Liam Lacey of The Globe and Mail stated, "Firth gives the performance his all as a man trapped in a vortex of grief, shame and hate, but as in Scott Hicks's Shine, which the film occasionally resembles, there's an overtidy relationship between trauma and catharsis".

=== Accolades ===
| Award | Category | Nominee | Result |
|---|---|---|---|
| AACTA Awards (4th) | Best Film | Chris Brown | Nominated |
| AACTA Awards (4th) | Best Film | Bill Curbishley | Nominated |
| AACTA Awards (4th) | Best Film | Andy Paterson | Nominated |
| AACTA Awards (4th) | Best Adapted Screenplay | Andy Paterson | Won |
| AACTA Awards (4th) | Best Adapted Screenplay | Frank Cottrell Boyce | Won |
| AACTA Awards (4th) | Best Cinematography | Gary Phillips | Nominated |
| AACTA Awards (4th) | Best Original Music Score | David Hirschfelder | Won |
| AACTA Awards (4th) | Best Sound | Gethin Creagh | Nominated |
| AACTA Awards (4th) | Best Sound | Colin Nicolson | Nominated |
| AACTA Awards (4th) | Best Sound | Andrew Plain | Nominated |
| AACTA Awards (4th) | Best Sound | Craig Walmsley | Nominated |
| AACTA Awards (4th) | Best Costume Design | Lizzy Gardiner | Nominated |
| ACS Awards | Mill Award for Cinematographer of the Year | Gary Phillips | Won |
| ACS Awards | Golden Tripod | Gary Phillips | Won |
| ASE Award | Best Editing in a Feature Film | Martin Connor | Nominated |
| FCCA Awards | Best Film | Chris Brown | Nominated |
| FCCA Awards | Best Film | Bill Curbishley | Nominated |
| FCCA Awards | Best Film | Andy Paterson | Nominated |
| FCCA Awards | Best Script | Andy Paterson | Won |
| FCCA Awards | Best Script | Frank Cottrell Boyce | Won |
| FCCA Awards | Best Actor | Colin Firth | Nominated |
| FCCA Awards | Best Actress | Nicole Kidman | Nominated |
| FCCA Awards | Best Editing | Martin Connor | Nominated |
| FCCA Awards | Best Production Design | Steven Jones-Evans | Nominated |
| Saturn Award (41st) | Best International Film | | Nominated |

== Historical accuracy ==
Philip Towle from the University of Cambridge, who specialises in the treatment of POWs, awarded the film three stars out of five for historical accuracy. Reviewing the film for History Extra, the website of BBC History Magazine, he said that, while he had no problem with the representation of the suffering of POWs or the way in which the Japanese are portrayed, "the impression [the film] gives of the post-war behaviour of former POWs of the Japanese is too generalised..."

Towle also points out that the meeting between Lomax and his tormentor was not unexpected, but rather there had been correspondence leading up to it. He writes that the film may not have made it clear: the railway was basically finished, and by the time of their rescue "...the main dangers to the POWs came from starvation and disease, allied bombing and the looming threat that all would be murdered by the Japanese at the end of the war."

== See also ==
- Cinema of Australia
