= "Good chap" theory =

Political principle

The "good chap" theory is a fundamental principle in British political culture, identified by the political historian Peter Hennessy. The "good chap" principle is expressed in the idea that ministers and civil servants recognize unwritten rules regarding the limits of their power, act accordingly, and resign when necessary – even when there are no written or enforceable laws concerning the matter.

== The principle ==
Hennessy argued that there is a cultural principle operating in British public life among judges, ministers, and other senior figures identified as "chaps" ("good chaps"), who acknowledge normative limits on their political power even when no legal or constitutional restrictions exist on their actions, at least in terms of written or enforceable law. Hennessy wrote that "The British Constitution is a state of mind," and that "it requires a sense of restraint all round to make it work."

This principle holds very high status. Historically, when relevant senior figures have breached its unwritten laws and abused their power, they have tended to resign and thus behaved as "good chaps." For example, the resignation of Peter Carington, foreign secretary under former British prime minister Margaret Thatcher, in 1982 following Argentina's invasion of the Falklands Islands – even though no fault was found in his actions – serves as an illustration of this principle.

Hennessy and Andrew Blick explain in their book Good Chaps No More that:

The nature of its constitution tells you a great deal about a country, its society and the way ruling power is calibrated and constrained within it. A key characteristic of the British constitution is the degree to which the good governance of the United Kingdom (UK) has relied on the self-restraint of those who carry it out. Unlike nearly every other democracy in the world, we lack a ‘written’ or ‘codified’ constitution. The UK has, therefore, no single text setting out the core principles, institutions and procedures of the system, protected from casual alteration by amendment procedures, and enforceable by the judiciary. Instead, in the UK, we have trusted politicians to behave themselves. We have long assumed that those who rise to high office will be ‘good chaps’, knowing what the unwritten rules are and wanting to adhere to them, even if doing so might frustrate the attainment of their policy objectives, party political goals, or personal ambitions – the argument being that ‘good chaps’ (of different sexes) know where the undrawn lines lie and come nowhere near to crossing them: hence ‘the good chap theory of government.’

— Blick, Andrew, and Peter Hennessy. "Good Chaps No More." Safeguarding the Constitution in Stressful Times (2019): 5-6.

== Application of the principle in the disclosure of sensitive information ==
The "good chap" principle also applies to the question of what information is appropriate to publish and write about in memoirs and journalistic columns, and what information should remain confidential. According to this idea, ministers and civil servants know how to properly balance the time elapsed since an event and the importance of keeping it secret against their desire to publish it. A prominent example of this principle's application is the memoir of Sir Bernard Ingham, former communications advisor to Prime Minister Margaret Thatcher. The publication of the memoir was considered decent, as Ingham waited until Thatcher had left political life.

Former Cabinet member Sir Richard Wilson declared in the early 2000s that civil servants have an "exceptional record" of keeping government secrets to themselves.

== The death of the principle ==
The common perception is that this is an idea that once covered British politics but no longer does. Former British prime minister Boris Johnson became a symbol of an outlier to the "good chap", both in the broad sense – using his political power beyond accepted norms – and specifically regarding the publication of sensitive information, as he did not obtain the approval of the Advisory Committee on Business Appointments before publishing his column in the Daily Mail.

Hennessy and other constitutional law experts emphasize that data show the principle has been lost, with those in power not resigning despite embarrassing examples of lies, corruption, and other scandals. In 2019, Hennessy and Andrew Blick wrote: "If general standards of proper behavior among senior British statesmen can no longer be taken for granted, then our core constitutional principles have also become transient." Blick explained that the abandonment of this principle is expected to have serious constitutional consequences, weakening Britain's democratic characteristics.
