= Tanroh Ishida =

Japanese actor

- 石田 淡朗
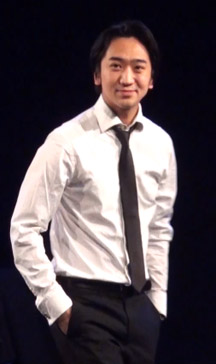
- Ishida at The Improsarios show in London, March 2013
- Born: October 29, 1987 (age 39); Bunkyo-ku, Tokyo, Japan
- Education: Guildhall School of Music and Drama
- Occupation: Actor
- Father: Yukio Ishida

Tanroh Ishida (石田 淡朗, Ishida Tanrō) is a Japanese actor based in London, UK.

== Career ==
Ishida was trained from the age of three in traditional Japanese Noh and Kyogen theater by his father and his father's master. He has performed at theaters in Japan, and at the Carnegie Hall in New York, and Shakespeare's Globe in London.

When he was 15, he moved to England to study at the Guildhall School of Music and Drama. After graduation, he formed his own theater company, "Tea Leaf Theatre".

== Filmography ==
- Beneath (2011), as The Wolf
- Gambit (2012), as Akihira Kontaro
- The Railway Man (2013), as the young Takashi Nagase
- Sen-nen no Yuraku (2013)
- 47 Ronin (2013), as Shogun's Adjutant
- The Windmill Massacre (2016) as Takashi
