= The Railway Man (book) =

Autobiographical book by Eric Lomax

- Author: Eric Lomax
- Subject: Pacific War
- Genre: memoir
- Publisher: Vintage
- Publication date: 1995
- Pages: 256
- ISBN: 9780099582311

The Railway Man is an autobiographical book by Eric Lomax about his experiences as a prisoner of war during World War II and being forced to help build the Thai–Burma Railway for the Japanese military. The book won the NCR Book Award and the PEN/Ackerley Prize for autobiography.

== Synopsis ==
Growing up before World War II, Lomax is fascinated by railways and spends his holidays trying to spot rare locomotives near his home in Edinburgh, Scotland.

During the war, Lomax serves as a signals officer and is captured when the Japanese conquer Singapore. At first, the Japanese are unable to efficiently control the large number of Allied prisoners captured when Singapore falls, but eventually the prisoners are dispersed into smaller camps. The prisoners in the camp where Lomax is being held build a secret radio receiver, which is discovered by the prison authorities. Lomax and several other prisoners are severely beaten, and two of them die from their injuries. Later, when guards discover Lomax has drawn a detailed map of the Siam-Burma railroad, which the prisoners are being forced to help build, he endures intense questioning and torture, including being waterboarded. He and the others are found guilty of anti-Japanese activity and are sent to a harsher prison, where they are starved nearly to death.

Eric is psychologically damaged by his treatment and, after the war, suffers from severe psychological problems and is only able to discuss his experiences as a POW with other former POWs. He eventually seeks treatment at the urging of his second wife.

He eventually makes contact with one of his Japanese interrogators after the war, and receives counseling to control his urge to hunt him down and attack him. Lomax discovers that the man has spent his life trying to make amends for his actions during the war by speaking out against militarism.

Lomax eventually goes back to Thailand to visit the area of the camps where he was a prisoner and meets his interrogator. Lomax is able to forgive him, and both men find the experience extremely moving.

== Adaptations ==
The book was made into a BBC television drama Prisoners in Time (1995), starring John Hurt as Lomax. It was later adapted into a film, The Railway Man (2013), directed by Jonathan Teplitzky, and starring Colin Firth and Jeremy Irvine (as old and young Lomax), Nicole Kidman (as his wife Patti), Hiroyuki Sanada and Stellan Skarsgård.
