= NCR Book Award =

The NCR Book Award for Non-Fiction, established in 1987 and sponsored by NCR Corporation, was for a time the UK's major award for non-fiction. Closing in 1997 after a period of decline and scandal, it is best remembered as the forerunner of the Samuel Johnson Prize.

== History ==
The award was founded at a time when there were no major non-fiction awards in Britain comparable to the highly successful Booker Prize for fiction. It was part of a new "golden age" of non-fiction that started in the 1980s, according to Antony Beevor. In the early 1990s, NCR was acquired by AT&T and the award became rudderless and dated; one critic said the "NCR spoke volumes of the Thatcherised values of contemporary English culture – a winner-takes-all triumphalism, a boastful indifference to good writing, a corresponding obsession with design and presentation". In 1997, the award experienced an existential scandal when it was revealed the judges had used "professional readers", summaries and book reviews instead of reading all of the entries. In response, one of the previous winners, Peter Hennessy, approached Penguin with the idea for a new award, and an anonymous benefactor was found who funded the establishment of the Samuel Johnson Prize (1999). Facing bad publicity and a tarnished reputation, the NCR Award closed out with A People's Tragedy in 1997.

== Winners ==
Source 1988–1995:

- 1988 David Thomson, Nairn in Darkness and Light (Hutchinson)
- 1989 Joe Simpson, Touching the Void (Jonathan Cape)
- 1990 Simon Schama, Citizens: A Chronicle of the French Revolution (Viking)
- 1991 Claire Tomalin, The Invisible Woman: The Story of Nelly Ternan and Charles Dickens (Viking)
- 1992 Jung Chang, Wild Swans: Three Daughters of China (HarperCollins)
- 1993 Peter Hennessy, Never Again: Britain 1945-1951 (Jonathan Cape)
- 1994 John Campbell, Edward Heath: A Biography (Jonathan Cape)
- 1995 Mark Hudson, Coming Back Brockens: A Year in a Mining Village (Jonathan Cape)
- 1996 Eric Lomax, The Railway Man (Jonathan Cape)
- 1997 Orlando Figes, A People's Tragedy: The Russian Revolution 1891-1924 (Jonathan Cape)
