= Junior barrister =

Barrister who has not attained the rank of King's Counsel

A junior barrister is a barrister who has not yet attained the rank of King's Counsel. Although the term is archaic and not commonly used, junior barristers (or "juniors") can also be referred to as utter barristers derived from "outer barristers" or barristers of the outer bar, in distinction to King's Counsel at the inner bar. They may also be referred to as stuff gownsmen, in contradistinction to the silk gowns worn by King's Counsel (who are therefore also known as "silks").

When students are called to the bar in jurisdictions which maintain barristers as a separate profession, they are said to be "called to the Degree of an Utter Barrister..." on their certificate of call. This reflects that in English court rooms King's Counsel sits one row further forward than junior barristers (historically, the Attorney General sits one row further forward still, although the Attorney General appears so rarely in court in modern times that the convention has largely been abandoned in that respect).

Because a relatively small proportion of barristers become King's Counsel, it is quite common for a "junior barrister" to be middle aged. Junior barristers who achieve over 10 years' 'on call' are sometimes referred to as "senior juniors".

== See also ==
- Barrister
- King's Counsel
