= Charlotte Beaumont =

English actress (born 1995)

- Born: 28 July 1995 (age 30); Watford, Hertfordshire, England
- Occupation: Actress
- Years active: 2010–present

Charlotte Beaumont (born 28 July 1995) is an English actress known for portraying Chloe Latimer in the ITV crime drama Broadchurch, as well as for her roles in Waterloo Road and the film Jupiter Ascending.

== Filmography ==
=== Television ===
Year	Title	Role	Notes	Ref(s)
2010, 2015	Holby City	Tammy Riley, Dora Wright	2 episodes	
2010	EastEnders	Tasha	4 episodes	
2010	Doctors	Daisy Wakefield	Episode: "Hanging On"	
2012	Skins	Cheska	Episode: "Alo"	
2013	Coming Up	Ellie	Episode: "Sink or Swim"	
2014	Tommy Cooper: Not Like That, Like This	Vicky Cooper	TV movie	
2013–2017	Broadchurch	Chloe Latimer	Main cast (series 1, 3), recurring role (series 2)	
2015	Waterloo Road	Kenzie Calhoun	Recurring role (series 10)	
2016	Midsomer Murders	Helena Pitt	Episode: "A Dying Art"	
2016	Obsession: Dark Desires	Janice	Episode: "Final Fantasy"	
2018	Zapped	Salle	Episode: "Popcorn"	
2018	Death in Paradise	Adelaide Scott	1 episode	
2025	EastEnders	Jill	1 episode	

=== Film ===
Year	Title	Role	Ref(s)
2010	Sex & Drugs & Rock & Roll	Jemima Dury	
2012	Six Bullets	Becky Fayden	
2015	Jupiter Ascending	Kiza	
2015	Balcony	Tina	
2016	The Windmill Massacre	Jennifer	

=== Stage ===
Year	Title	Role	Notes	Ref(s)
2014	3 Winters	Young Alisa	Royal National Theatre	
2019	Romeo and Juliet	Juliet	Shakespeare's Globe	
2019	The Lovely Bones	Susie Salmon	Birmingham Repertory Theatre / UK tour	
2021	Fair Play	Sophie	Bush Theatre	
2023	The Journey to Venice	Vivian Sunde	Finborough Theatre	
