= Sheila Atim =

Ugandan actress (born 1991)

Sheila Atim MBE
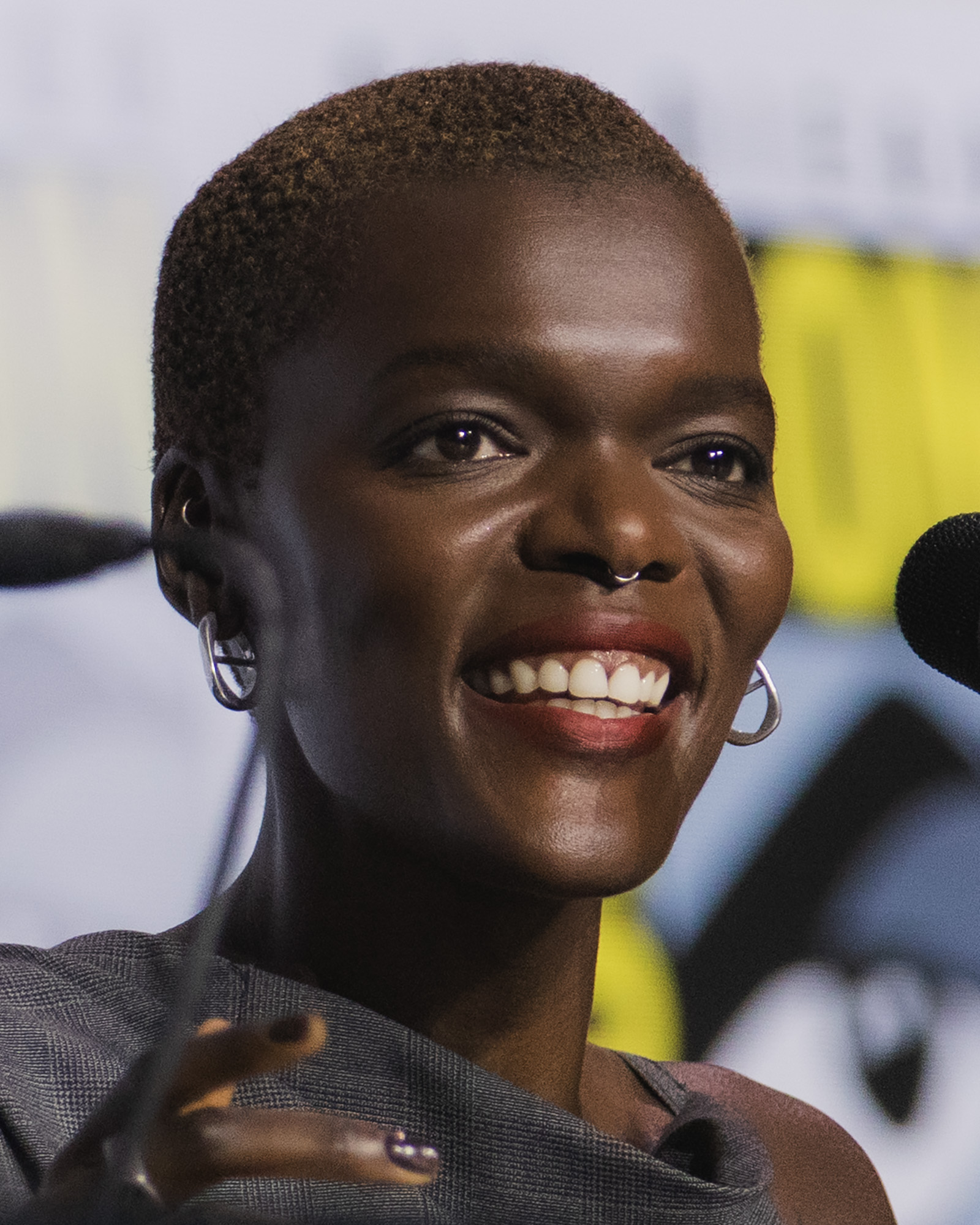
- Atim in 2026
- Born: 1991 (age 34–35); Uganda
- Education: King's College London (Biomedical science)
- Occupation: Actress
- Years active: 2014–present

Sheila Atim MBE (/əˈtɪm/; born c. 1991) is a Ugandan actress. She made her professional acting debut in 2014 at Shakespeare's Globe in The Lightning Child, a musical written by her acting teacher Ché Walker.

Following critically acclaimed stage roles in the Donmar Warehouse's all-female Shakespeare Trilogy in 2016 among others, Atim won the Laurence Olivier Award for Best Actress in a Supporting Role in a Musical for her role as Marianne Laine in an original production of Girl from the North Country. She has composed songs for several productions and premiered her play Anguis at the 2019 Edinburgh Festival Fringe. She has also been cast in several television series, including the cancelled Game of Thrones successor series Bloodmoon, the BBC's The Pale Horse, and Amazon's The Underground Railroad, directed by Barry Jenkins. She starred in Netflix's successful sports drama Bruised and won another Laurence Olivier Award, this time for Best Actress, for her performance in the play Constellations.

== Early life ==
Sheila Atim was born c. 1991 in Uganda and moved to the United Kingdom with her mother at the age of five months. She grew up in Rainham, London, and attended the Coopers' Company and Coborn School. She did some occasional modelling as a teenager after being recruited when she shaved the side of her head for a school prom. She appeared in a 2009 London Fashion Week event, All Walks beyond the Catwalk, organized by the British Fashion Council to showcase clothes for "real women". She later said that "modelling was never a big earner for me. I was unusual looking, so I couldn't go for commercial castings."

== Career ==
=== Theatre ===
Atim graduated with a degree in biomedical science from King's College London and trained as an actor at the Weekend Arts Centre in Belsize Park, London. She became involved in a workshop for a new play, The Lightning Child, which led to her being cast by her acting teacher Ché Walker for her professional acting debut at Shakespeare's Globe in 2013. In 2020, she told the King's College alumni magazine that "I look back and feel a strong connection between my scientific and artistic sides. Science often comes up in my work – even the way I approach things in the rehearsal room is affected by having taken BioMed. Sometimes it’s little private parallels and analogies I make for myself."

The Lightning Child, written by Walker and Arthur Darvill, ran for several weeks from mid-September 2013 and was the first musical staged at Shakespeare's Globe. It received mixed reviews, with the Financial Times describing it as "a bold experiment, but sadly not a successful one" and The Guardian review calling it "oddly conventional and pointlessly excessive". The Independent said that despite the production being overlong and having problems with the structure, it was "hard not to like" the show.

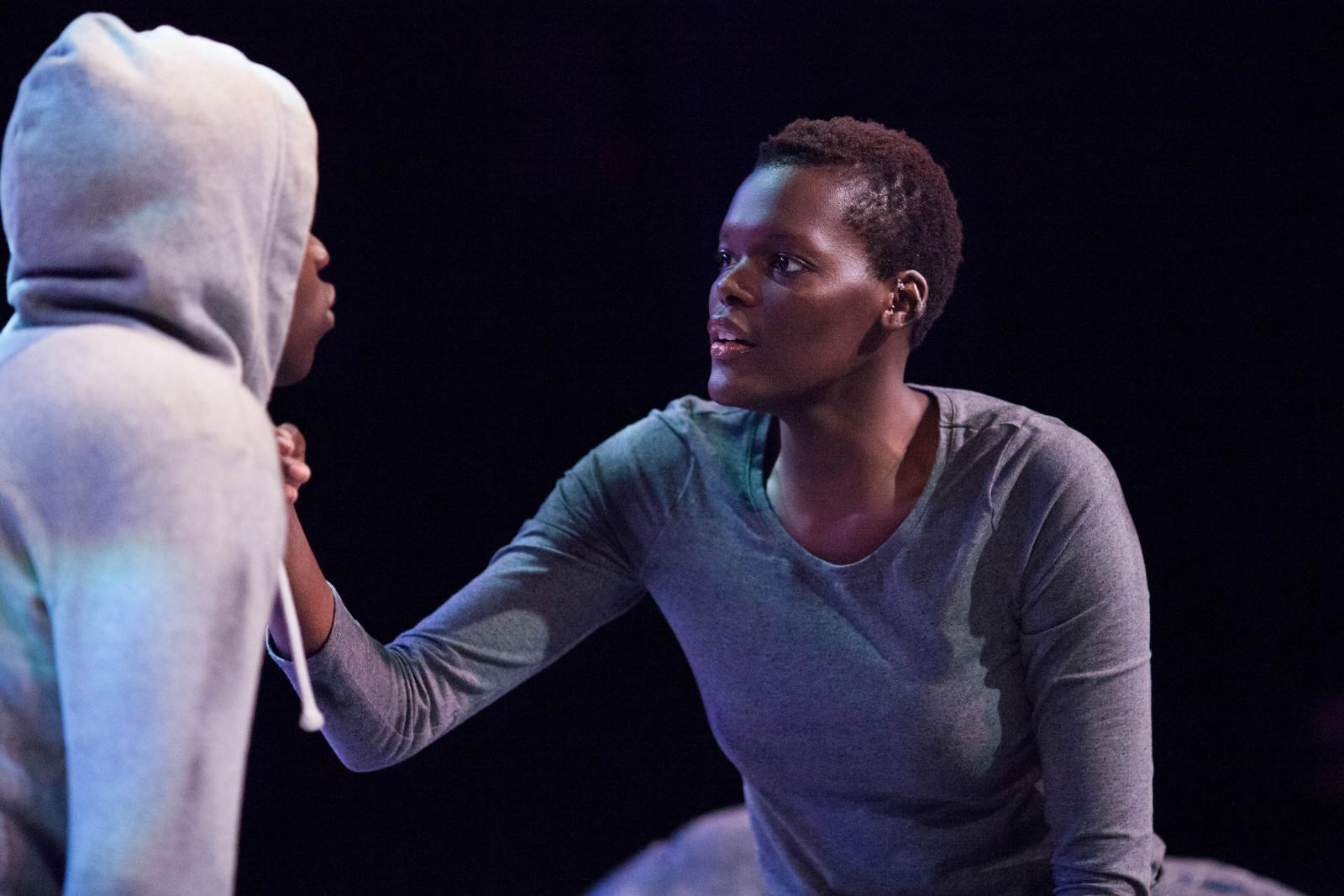
Atim (right), with Damson Idris in Ghost Town (2014)

Atim played Keira, the physical embodiment of obsessive–compulsive disorder, in Ghost Town at the York Theatre Royal in early 2014. What's On Stage praised her "mesmeric physical presence" and The Yorkshire Times review said that Atim "dominated the stage". Following this, Atim appeared with Ako Mitchell in Walker's two-hander Klook's Last Stand, being praised by The Guardian for an energetic performance and "tremendous stage presence" by The Daily Telegraph. In the autumn of 2014 she appeared alongside Adelayo Adedayo and Nakay Kpaka in Rachel at the Finborough Theatre and followed this by joining the touring production of Kae Tempest's Hopelessly Devoted. In addition to this, Atim played three roles in Royal Shakespeare Company (RSC) productions: the Attendant in The Jew of Malta, Julia in Love's Sacrifice, and Assistant to Lady Politic Would-Be in Volpone. Walker's The Etienne Sisters, which included songs composed by Atim, opened two days before the end of her run in Volpone.

==== Leading roles ====
Atim's first major stage role was the non-speaking part of The Woman in Les Blancs at the National Theatre in 2016. The Stage said of her performance that "at the centre of the narrative is its most potent character: a gaunt, stooped and silent woman." The New York Times described a "spine-tingling production" and suggested that Atim's character may be an emblem of Africa. The Times later referred to her performance as "mesmerising".

Atim received acclaim for her 2016 performances in the Donmar Warehouse's all-female Shakespeare Trilogy set in a women's prison, when she played Ferdinand in The Tempest, Gadshill and Lady Percy in Henry IV, and Lucius in Julius Caesar. The Guardian said Atim was "a glorious, giddy Ferdinand and a moving Lady Percy – [and] frequently seems to be physically stabbing the text as much as speaking it" and The Independent wrote "Sheila Atim (Ferdinand) and Leah Harvey (Miranda) are adorably funny and charming as they capture the giddy gaucheries of first love." Atim won a 2018 Clarence Derwent Award, presented to best supporting actors in London productions, for her roles in The Tempest and Les Blancs.

Her leading role in Babette received a more mixed assessment, with The Times saying she was "the best thing about [the] production" while The Daily Telegraph review said "It's a pity ... that Babette, whose story this is, should remain, in Atim's somewhat remote performance, so distant a figure."

She played Marianne Laine in the original run of the musical Girl from the North Country at The Old Vic in London from 26 July to 7 October 2017. Following the success of The Old Vic production, it transferred into London's West End at the Noël Coward Theatre from 29 December for a limited 12-week run until 24 March 2018. The play is set during the Great Depression and Atim's character Marianne Laine is a black woman, who was adopted by a white couple that run a struggling guesthouse. The character is pregnant and appears to have been forsaken by the father of her unborn child. The music for the show consists of songs by Bob Dylan and amongst the numbers that Atim performs are his "Tight Connection to My Heart (Has Anybody Seen My Love)" and "Idiot Wind". The Guardian described Atim as "outstanding" in the role, with delivery of "Tight Connection to My Heart (Has Anybody Seen My Love)" being "direct, unaffected and perfectly poised" and her performance of "Idiot Wind" a "beautiful reading". The Times stated that "Atim, in a strong cast, is standout," in an article that was headlined "She sings Dylan better than Bob." For her Girl from the North Country role, she received a nomination for Best Supporting Actress in a Play at the 18th WhatsOnStage awards and won the 2018 Laurence Olivier award for Best Supporting Actress in a Musical.

In 2018, she played Emilia opposite Mark Rylance's Iago in Othello at Shakespeare's Globe, where according to The Independent, "she unleashed a fury that blew the greatest actor of his generation off the stage."

Atim presented her first play as an author, Anguis, at the 2019 Edinburgh Festival Fringe. It features Cleopatra being interviewed by a scientist and singing, Atim also having composed the songs. The Times considered it to be an "intriguing look at female power ... that marks [Atim] as a playwright to watch", whereas The Scotsman, while praising the songs and some performances, lamented that "the stories of the hugely privileged queen and the stressed-out modern black Londoner never quite come together as strongly as the situation promises."

=== Television, film, and music ===
Atim played Viola and Sebastian in a film version of Shakespeare's Twelfth Night, and won the Screen Nation 2019 Best Female Performance film award. In 2018 she portrayed Limehouse Nell in ITV's Harlots.

Atim plays piano, violin, bass, and drums. She composed the score for the play Time Is Love at London's Finborough Theatre in 2019, the year that she was named one of the cast of the Game of Thrones prequel series Bloodmoon. The planned series was cancelled following the pilot episode. She appeared as an alleged witch in the 2020 BBC adaptation of Agatha Christie's The Pale Horse and in 2021 she appeared in the television series The Underground Railroad and The Irregulars and the film Bruised.

In June 2019, Atim was named an MBE for her services to drama. She is also on the Board of Trustees of The Old Vic Theatre Trust. On October 10, 2025, it was announced she will be playing the character of Akasha (previously played by Aaliyah) in Anne Rice's The Vampire Lestat (2026) (better known as Interview with the Vampire Season 3).

== Acting credits ==
=== Film ===
Year	Title	Role	Notes	Ref.
2018	Twelfth Night	Viola/Sebastian		
2020	Sulphur and White	Samira		
2020	Bruised	Bobbi "Buddhakan" Berroa		
2020	The Show	John Conqueror		
2022	Doctor Strange in the Multiverse of Madness	Sara Wolfe		
2022	Pinocchio	Signora Vitelli		
2022	The Woman King	Amenza		
2023	All Dirt Roads Taste of Salt	Evelyn		
2024	Mufasa: The Lion King	Ajarry (voice)		
2024	Leaving Ikorodu in 1999	Mother	Short film	
2025	Dust Bunny	Brenda		

=== Television ===
Year	Title	Role	Notes	Ref.
2014	I Live with Models	Mean Girl 1	1 episode	
2018	Harlots	Limehouse Nell	Recurring role, 8 episodes	
2019	Bounty Hunters	The Investigator	Recurring role, 5 episodes	
2019	The Feed	Amanda Javad	4 episodes	
2020	The Pale Horse	Thyrza Grey	Miniseries, 2 episodes	
2021	The Irregulars	The Tooth Fairy	Episode: "Chapter Two: The Ghosts of 221B"	
2021	The Underground Railroad	Mabel	Miniseries, 6 episodes	
2024	Royal Kill List	Storyteller	Miniseries	
2025	Marvel Zombies	Sara Wolfe (voice)	2 episodes	
2026	Blade Runner 2099	TBA	Post-production	
2026	Anne Rice's The Vampire Lestat	Akasha		

=== Theatre ===
Dates	Title	Role	Venue	Ref.
18 September – 12 October 2013 (Note: Professional debut)	The Lightning Child	Maenad	Shakespeare's Globe	
6 February – 4 March 2014	Ghost Town	Keira	York Theatre Royal (Pilot Theatre)	
13 June – 6 July 2014	Klook's Last Stand	Vinette	Park Theatre, London	
30 September – 25 October 2014	Rachel	Mrs. Laine	Finborough Theatre	
From 6 November 2014	Hopelessly Devoted	Chess	National tour (starting at Lincoln Performing Arts Centre)	
18 March – 8 September 2015	The Jew of Malta	Attendant	Swan Theatre, Stratford-upon-Avon (Royal Shakespeare Company)	
11 April – 24 June 2015	Love's Sacrifice	Julia	Swan Theatre, Stratford-upon-Avon (Royal Shakespeare Company)	
3 July – 12 September 2015	Volpone	Assistant to Lady Politic Would-Be	Swan Theatre, Stratford-upon-Avon (Royal Shakespeare Company)	
10 September – 3 October 2015	The Etienne Sisters	Additional songs (Note: Non-acting)	Theatre Royal Stratford East	
22 March – 2 June 2016	Les Blancs	The Woman	National Theatre	
23 September – 17 December 2016	Shakespeare Trilogy: The Tempest	Ferdinand	Donmar Warehouse	
23 September – 17 December 2016	Shakespeare Trilogy: Henry IV	Gadshill & Lady Percy	Donmar Warehouse	
23 September – 17 December 2016	Shakespeare Trilogy: Julius Caesar	Lucius	Donmar Warehouse	
23–25 March 2017	Black Lives Black Words – The Interrogation of Sandra Bland	Bland One	Bush Theatre	
9 May – 3 June 2017	Babette's Feast	Babette	Print Room	
26 July – 7 October 2017	Girl from the North Country	Marianne Laine	Old Vic	
29 December 2017 – 24 March 2018	Girl from the North Country	Marianne Laine	Noël Coward Theatre	
20 July – 13 October 2018	Othello	Emilia	Shakespeare's Globe	
1–26 January 2019	Time is love / Tiempo Es Amor	Rosa	Finborough Theatre	
1–26 August 2019	Anguis	Author	Gilded Balloon Teviot	
18 June – 1 August 2021	Constellations	Marianne	Vaudeville Theatre	

=== Radio ===
Year	Title	Role	Distributor	Ref.
2017	The Anansi Boys	Rosie, Sybilla	BBC Radio 4	
2018	Loose Ends	Guest	BBC Radio 4	

== Awards and nominations ==
Year	Award	Category	Work	Result	Ref.
2017	Evening Standard Theatre Award	Emerging Talent	Girl from the North Country	Nominated	
2017	Critics’ Circle Theatre Award	Most Promising Newcomer	Girl from the North Country	Won	
2018	Laurence Olivier Award	Best Actress in a Supporting Role in a Musical	Girl from the North Country	Won	
2018	Clarence Derwent Award (Note: The awards honour best supporting actors in London productions.)		Les Blancs and The Tempest	Won	
2019	Screen Nation Film and Television Award	Best Female Performance in Film	Twelfth Night	Won	
2022	Laurence Olivier Award	Best Actress	Constellations	Won	
2022	Evening Standard Theatre Awards	Best Actress	Constellations	Nominated	
2023	British Academy Film Awards	EE Rising Star Award		Nominated	
