= Harry Hepple =

English actor

- Born: David Matthew Hepple; Sunderland, England
- Occupation: Actor
- Years active: 2006–present
- Partner: Carly Bawden

Harry Hepple (born David Matthew Hepple) is a British actor and musician.

== Early life ==
Hepple graduated from the Royal Academy of Dramatic Art in 2006.

== Career ==
Upon graduating from RADA, Hepple made his professional debut in Alaska at the Royal Court Theatre with Rafe Spall and Christine Bottomley.

He then appeared in Burnt by the Sun alongside Ciarán Hinds, Rory Kinnear and Michelle Dockery at the Royal National Theatre.

In June 2009, Hepple appeared in Been So Long by Ché Walker, with music by Arthur Darvill, at the Young Vic.

He has appeared on stage in theatres across the United Kingdom including the Young Vic, Live Theatre, Newcastle, the Traverse Theatre, The Bush, the Royal Court Theatre, the Menier Chocolate Factory, the Donmar Warehouse, the Noël Coward Theatre, the Shakespeare's Globe and the Royal National Theatre.

He has appeared on TV on BBC's Inspector George Gently, Hustle, Holby City and Boy Meets Girl and on E4's Misfits.

== Personal life ==
Hepple is in a relationship with stage actress Carly Bawden.

== Credits ==
=== Theatre ===
Year	Title	Role	Notes
2006	Alaska	Russell	Royal Court
2007	I Caught Crabs in Walberswick	Wheeler	Bush Theatre
2009	Burnt by the Sun	Lapin	National Theatre
2009	Been So Long	Gil	Young Vic
2009	Jump	Ross	Live Theatre
2010	25th Annual Putnam County Spelling Bee	Chip	Donmar Warehouse
2011	Hot Mess	Polo	Arcola Theatre
2011–2012	Pippin	Pippin	Menier Chocolate Factory
2013	A Midsummer Night's Dream	Quince	Regent's Park
2013	Privates on Parade	Charles	Noël Coward Theatre
2013	Macbeth	Lennox	Shakespeare's Globe
2013	The Lightning Child	Neil/Shug	Shakespeare's Globe
2014	A Taste of Honey	Geoff	National Theatre
2019	Follies	Young Buddy	Olivier Theatre
2021-2022	Hamilton	King George III	Victoria Palace Theatre
2023	Assassins	Charles Guiteau	Chichester Festival Theatre
2024	Hamilton	King George III	Victoria Palace Theatre
2024	Hello, Dolly!	Cornelius Hackl	London Palladium
2025	Acorn Antiques	Tony	Hope Mill Theatre

=== Television ===
Year	Title	Role	Notes
2009	Inspector George Gently	Student	Season 3 Episode 2 "Peace & Love"
2011	Misfits	Luke	Season 2 Christmas Special
2012	Hustle	Barry	Season 8 Episode 1 "Goldfinger"
2013	Holby City	Patient X 'Charlie'	Season 15 Episode 42 "Never Let Me Go"
2015–2016	Boy Meets Girl	Leo	Main character 12 episodes
2023	The Chelsea Detective	Josh Downing	Season 2 Episode 2 "Golden Years"
