= Been So Long (film) =

2018 film by Tinge Krishnan

- Directed by: Tinge Krishnan
- Screenplay by: Ché Walker
- Based on: Been So Long by Arthur Darvill and Ché Walker
- Produced by: Amanda Jenks; Nadine Marsh-Edwards
- Starring: Michaela Coel; Arinze Kene
- Cinematography: Catherine Derry
- Edited by: Peter Christelis
- Music by: Christopher Nicholas Bangs; Arthur Darvill; Additional lyricist include Fabian Spencer
- Production companies: BFI; Film4; Greenacre Film
- Distributed by: Netflix
- Release date: 26 October 2018
- Country: United Kingdom
- Language: English

Been So Long is a 2018 musical film directed by Tinge Krishnan and based on the musical of the same name, with a screenplay written by Ché Walker. The film is set in Camden Town, London, and scenes were filmed in Camden Market, Regent's Canal, and Primrose Hill.

It is based on a musical premiered at the Young Vic on July 11, 2009. This was based on Walker's original 1998 play of the same name.

The film was released on 26 October 2018 by Netflix.

== Plot ==
The film is set in London’s multicultural Camden Town, where Simone is a single parent caring for her daughter. Both smart and self-sufficient, she is focused at her hair salon job, and prioritises her daughter above all else. Simone is mostly content, albeit a little unfulfilled.

Her best friend Yvonne believes Simone needs more of a life. She insists they go out drinking to meet men, because Simone hasn't dated in a long time. In fact, Yvonne badly needs her friend as a wing-woman to help her find one.

With Simone’s mother childminding, they head out to Camden, ending up at their old haunt Bar Arizona, now run by the late owner’s son Barney. When Simone meets Raymond, a recent ex-con now working as a street-cleaner, the two flirt over a game of draughts. She suddenly awakens from her sexless stupor.

The encounter proves to be fruitless for them both – but the seed has been planted. In a combination of serendipity and mutual infatuation, a romance slowly blooms between Simone and Raymond. They kiss and become more intimate.

While Simone and Raymond have their ups and downs, Yvonne connects with a courier who regularly delivers to her office job. She also helps Simone out with childcare.

One day, Simone’s ex- partner Kestrel appears outside her daughter's school. A reminder of Simone’s pain, he re-enters her life to get to know their daughter; he's her father.

This threatens not only Simone’s relationship with Raymond, but also her friendship with Yvonne. Her trust issues isolate her. Instead of rejoicing in her new-found love, she ends up fearful, so has to learn again to let people in.

Raymond also has his demons, including his old friend Wendell, a new dad, and Gil, a young, troubled and wild knife-wielding young man who is stalking him. Raymond struggles in his own way.

A duet between Simone and Raymond – in a kebab shop busy with other Londoners– binds their romance.

== Cast ==
- Michaela Coel as Simone
- Arinzé Kene as Raymond
- George MacKay as Gil
- Joe Dempsie as Kestrel
- Luke Norris as Barney
- Arsher Ali as Jake
- Rakie Ayola as Martina
- Ronkẹ Adékoluẹjo as Yvonne
- Ashley Thomas as Wendell
- Sophia La Porta as Willesden
- Tom Forbes as Conrad
- Mark Wingett as Bailiff
- Genevieve Barr as Artemis

== Production ==
In May 2017, it was announced that principal production of the film had concluded in London, UK. In September 2017, Netflix bought worldwide rights to the film, in what was a "multi-million dollar deal", believed to be Netflix's largest single acquisition of a U.K. film in its history at the time.

== Soundtrack ==
Been So Long: Official Soundtrack

Soundtrack album by Christopher Nicholas Bangs
- Released: October 26, 2018
- Studio: Netflix
- Genre: Soundtrack
- Label: Virgin EMI Records

The musical score for Been So Long was composed by Christopher Nicholas Bangs, and features music from the film’s stars.

The digital album was released through Virgin EMI Records on 26 October 2018.

| No. | Title | Performers | Length |
|---|---|---|---|
| 1. | "Love Is" | Arinze Kene; Michaela Coel | 3:44 |
| 2. | "What U Sayin" | Michaela Coel; Ronke Adekoluejo | 2:05 |
| 3. | "I Want A Fella" | Ronke Adekoluejo | 2:53 |
| 4. | "Primus Humanus (Man Of Steel)" | Arinze Kene | 1:24 |
| 5. | "Smile" | George MacKay | 2:42 |
| 6. | "Raymond Receives Texts" | Christopher Nicholas Bangs | 2:05 |
| 7. | "Park Bench" | Christopher Nicholas Bangs | 1:22 |
| 8. | "Thunder And Gold" | Arinze Kene; Michaela Coel | 3:28 |
| 9. | "Fire" | Arinze Kene; Michaela Coel | 2:15 |
| 10. | "Who Is It Against The Whole World?" | Christopher Nicholas Bangs | 1:50 |
| 11. | "Closing Time" | Luke Norris | 2:07 |
| Total length: | | | 67:57 |

== Release ==
It was released on October 26, 2018 by Netflix.

== Reception ==
On review aggregator Rotten Tomatoes, the film holds an approval rating of 92%, based on 12 reviews, with an average rating of 6.8/10. On Metacritic, the film has a weighted average score of 74 out of 100, based on 5 critics, indicating "generally favorable reviews".
