= Donald Hewlett =

English actor (1920–2011)

- Born: Donald Marland Hewlett; 30 August 1920; Northenden, Manchester, England
- Died: 4 June 2011 (aged 90); Chelsea, London, England
- Occupation: Actor
- Years active: 1954–1995
- Spouses: Christine Pollon (m. 1947, dissolved) Diana Greenwood (m. 1956, dissolved) Thérèse McMurray (m. 1979)
- Children: 5, including Siobhan Hewlett
- Relatives: Thomas Hewlett (father); Thomas Hewlett (brother)

Donald Marland Hewlett (30 August 1920 – 4 June 2011) was an English actor. He was best known for his sitcom roles as Colonel Charles Reynolds in It Ain't Half Hot Mum and Lord Meldrum in You Rang, M'Lord?, both written by Jimmy Perry and David Croft. He also had other roles in British film and television productions.

== Early life ==
Hewlett was born into a wealthy family; his father Thomas Hewlett was Conservative MP for Manchester Exchange from 1940 to 1945 and owned the Anchor Chemical Company based in Clayton, Manchester (now a subsidiary of Air Products and Chemicals). His mother died when he was ten. He was the brother of Thomas Hewlett, Baron Hewlett.

Hewlett was educated at Clifton College in Bristol followed by St John's College, Cambridge, where he studied geography and meteorology and was part of the Footlights Revue, but volunteered for the RNVR early in World War II. He served in the Royal Navy as a lieutenant and meteorologist. and was stationed for several years in Kirkwall in the Orkney Islands where he was a founder member of the Kirkwall Arts Club. He later served in the North Atlantic aboard the light cruisers Malaya and Galatea. He rose to the rank of lieutenant. He was subsequently posted to Singapore, in charge of Japanese POWs and as entertainment officer.

== Career ==
Following his demob, rather than return to Cambridge University, Hewlett trained at RADA and gained his first professional acting job in repertory theatre at the Oxford Playhouse where he suggested the management should cast Ronnie Barker in his first, small, role. His first film acting role was the part of Lincoln Green in Orders are Orders (1954).

His television appearances included The Ronnie Corbett Show, The Ronnie Barker Playhouse, The Saint, The Avengers, The Dick Emery Show, the episode "Beggar on Horseback" from the television series Crown Court and the Doctor Who story The Claws of Axos (1971). However, he gained his most prominent role in the Croft and Perry sitcom It Ain't Half Hot Mum (1974–81) as Colonel Charles Reynolds. He was cast with Michael Knowles in another David Croft sitcom, the sci-fi parody Come Back Mrs. Noah (1977–78), and later with the successful You Rang, M'Lord? (1988–93), as George, Lord Meldrum (a part written specially for him).

Hewlett also appeared in the episode "Hello Sailor" from the sitcom Happy Ever After in 1977 which starred Terry Scott and June Whitfield. Hewlett made a number of film appearances including Spike Milligan's Adolf Hitler - My Part in His Downfall, A Touch of Class, Carry On Behind and The First Great Train Robbery.

Hewlett was cast with Knowles again for the BBC Radio series Anything Legal in 1984. Other roles included 'Winkworth' in Morris Minor's Marvellous Motors in 1989 and The Adventures of Brigadier Wellington-Bull. His last TV appearance was in The Upper Hand in 1995. He appeared in several episodes of The Enchanting World of Hinge and Bracket, playing the ship's captain when they embarked on a cruise.

In 1995, he debuted on stage in a production of Mother Goose at the Churchill Theatre, alongside Ronnie Corbett. Hewlett was forced to retire that same year when he developed epilepsy caused from a damaged heart valve.

== Personal life ==
Hewlett's previous marriages, to Christine Pollon and Diana Greenwood, ended in divorce. He had two sons and a daughter by Greenwood. Having previously lived for several years in Whitstable, Kent, he lived in Argos Hill, Mayfield beside Argos Hill Windmill with his third wife Thérèse McMurray-Hewlett, by whom he had a son and daughter. His younger daughter, Siobhan Hewlett, is an actress, best known for her role in Irina Palm.

Hewlett had houses in London and Whitstable and divided his time there, and spent the last two years of his life in Chelsea.

== Death ==
Hewlett died from pneumonia on 4 June 2011 at the Chelsea and Westminster Hospital in West London aged 90. His wife revealed that he had been ill for some time, and also had Alzheimer's disease at the time of his death.

== Filmography ==
=== Film ===
Year	Title	Role	Notes
1954	Orders Are Orders	Lincoln Green	
1960	Bottoms Up	Hamley	
1964	The Beauty Jungle	Advertising Agent	Uncredited
1973	Adolf Hitler - My Part in His Downfall	Senior Officer	
1973	A Touch of Class	Spencer Birdsall	Uncredited
1974	Moments	Mr. Samuelson	
1975	Carry On Behind	The Dean	
1976	Confessions of a Driving Instructor	Chief Examiner	
1978	The First Great Train Robbery	Club Member	Uncredited
1986	Saving Grace	Monsignor Colin McGee	

=== Television ===
Year	Title	Role	Notes
1959	The Adventures of Brigadier Wellington-Bull	Captain Sooty Pikington	5 episodes
1963	Hancock	Hotel Receptionist	1 episode
1965	Sir Arthur Conan Doyle's Sherlock Holmes	Horace Harker	1 episode
1965	Coronation Street	Robert 'Bob' Maxwell	2 episodes
1967	Further Adventures of Lucky Jim		1 episode
1968	The Ronnie Barker Playhouse	Nigel (episode 5 Talk of Angels)	
1971	Doctor Who - The Claws of Axos	Hardiman	4 episodes
1971–1973	Now Look Here	Colonel Sutcliffe	11 episodes
1973	Crown Court	Philip Sankins	3 episodes
1974	The Protectors	Chambers	1 episode
1974–1981	It Ain't Half Hot Mum	Lieutenant-Colonel Charles Reynolds	56 episodes
1975–1976	Rogue's Rock	Wing Commander Rogue	21 episodes
1977–1978	Come Back Mrs. Noah	Carstairs	6 episodes
1988–1993	You Rang, M'Lord?	Lord George Meldrum	26 episodes
1989	Goldeneye	Admiral Godfrey	TV movie
