= Naana Agyei-Ampadu =

British actress

- Born: Accra
- Citizenship: Ghana, United Kingdom
- Education: University of Sussex
- Occupation: actress

Naana Agyei-Ampadu is a British actress of Ghanaian descent.

Her stage credits include Caroline, Or Change, Avenue Q, Che Walker's The Frontline, Juliet in Measure for Measure at Shakespeare's Globe, Been So Long and Feast (Young Vic). She was nominated for an Evening Standard Award for her performance in Been So Long. She played Corine Priestley Death in Paradise S11:E4 (2022).

== Early life ==
Agyei-Ampadu was born in Accra, Ghana and moved to the UK at the age of 5. She studied law at the University of Sussex, before embarking on a career in acting. She graduated from the Central School of Speech and Drama.

== Filmography ==
=== Film ===
| Year | Title | Role | Notes | Ref. |
|---|---|---|---|---|
| 2018 | Ready Player One | Gospel Singer | Uncredited | |
| 2024 | Hard Truths | Aleisha's Supervisor | | |

=== Television ===
| Year | Title | Role | Notes | Ref. |
|---|---|---|---|---|
| 2010 | Coming Up | Kim | Episode: "The Future WAGs of Great Britain" | |
| 2015 | Cuffs | Shelley | Recurring role; 2 episodes | |
| 2019 | GameFace | Sally | Recurring role; 3 episodes | |
| 2020 | Enterprice | Tola | Episode: "Crazy South" | |
| 2021 | The Wheel of Time | Danya | Episode: "Leavetaking" | |
| 2021 | Ragdoll | Kate | Episode: "Episode 4" | |
| 2022 | Industry | Sadie Sackey | Episode: "Short to the Point of Pain" | |
| 2022 | Death in Paradise | Corine Priestley | Episode: "Undercover and Out" | |
| 2023 | Mrs Sidhu Investigates | Sergeant Mint | Miniseries; 4 episodes | |
| 2025 | Malpractice | Precious Danso | Series regular; 5 episodes | |

== Theatre credits ==
| Year | Title | Role | Venue | Notes | Ref. |
|---|---|---|---|---|---|
| 2008 | Little Shop of Horrors | Ronnette | New Wolsey Theatre, Ipswich | | |
| 2008–2009 | The Frontline | Babydoll | Shakespeare's Globe, London | | |
| 2009 | Been So Long | Yvonne | Young Vic, London | | |
| 2013 | Feast | Oshun | Young Vic, London | | |
| 2013 | The Amen Corner | Ida Jackson | Olivier Theatre, London | | |
| 2014–2015 | Made in Dagenham | Cass | Adelphi Theatre, London | | |
| 2015 | Measure for Measure | Juliet | Shakespeare's Globe, London | | |
| 2015 | Oresteia | Cassandra | Shakespeare's Globe, London | | |
| 2015 | I Want My Hat Back | The Thing | Temporary Theatre, London | | |
| 2016 | Fury | Chorus | Soho Theatre, London | | |
| 2016 | A Pacifist's Guide to the War on Cancer | Gia | Dorfman Theatre, London | | |
| 2017 | Touch | Vera | Soho Theatre, London | | |
| 2018 | Caroline, or Change | Dotty Moffett | Hampstead Theatre, London | | |
| 2018 | King | Freedom Fighter | Hackney Empire, London | | |
| 2018 | Pericles | Thaisa | Olivier Theatre, London | | |
| 2018–2019 | Caroline, or Change | Caroline Thibodeaux | Playhouse Theatre, London | | |
| 2019–2020 | Fairview | Jasmine | Young Vic, London | | |
| 2020–2021 | Nine Lessons and Carols | Cast | Almeida Theatre, London | | |
| 2021 | Last Easter | June | Orange Tree Theatre, London | | |
| 2021–2022 | Trouble in Mind | Millie Davis | Dorfman Theatre, London | | |
| 2022 | The Collaboration | Voices | Young Vic, London | | |
| 2025– | Harry Potter and the Cursed Child | Hermione Granger | Palace Theatre, London | | |
