= Show Pieces =

- Directed by: Mitch Jenkins
- Written by: Alan Moore
- Produced by: Pete Coogan
- Starring: Darrell D'Silva; Siobhan Hewlett; Alan Moore; Robert Goodman; Khandie Khisses
- Cinematography: Trevor Forrest
- Edited by: Colin Goudie
- Release dates: 17 April 2014 (Buenos Aires); 6 May 2016
- Running time: "Act of Faith": 19 minutes; "Upon Reflection": 8 minutes; "Jimmy's End": 34 minutes; "A Professional Relationship": 10 minutes; "His Heavy Heart": 30 minutes
- Country: United Kingdom
- Language: English

Show Pieces is a British short film anthology written by Alan Moore and directed by Mitch Jenkins. The series follows a man, James, who finds himself in a strange working men's club after his death.

The shorts were set and filmed in Northampton, England. The anthology consists of five short films with a total running time of 95 minutes. A theatrical cut has a running time of 77 minutes.

Three of the shorts were funded by Lex, "Jimmy’s End" was funded by Vice and the last instalment, "His Heavy Heart" was financed via Kickstarter.

== Synopsis ==
"Act of Faith"
Faith Harrington, a young female reporter on a local newspaper who has an exotic private life, prepares for a stimulating evening at home that does not go according to plan.

"Upon Reflection"
Details Faith Harrington's first bewildered arrival at the peculiar working men's club immediately after the event that concludes Act of Faith, all captured in a fixed security mirror above a club's oddly anachronistic lounge bar.

"Jimmy's End"
Louche and hard-drinking womaniser James Mitchum finds himself wandering into one strange bar too many.

"A Professional Relationship"
Explores the peculiar relationship between the club's two managers.

"His Heavy Heart"
Picks up the narrative of the hapless James Mitchum from a point following his dreadful realisation at the conclusion of Jimmy's End. In a grotesque parody of Egyptian funerary rites, James is shepherded less than gently into his unenviable afterlife.

== Reception ==
In a segment on Channel 4 News on 22 August 2014, Moore's scripts were described as "his mix of the mysterious and banal which unfolds in his beloved hometown where the working men’s club plays host to a bleak and graphic journey through purgatory."

In a positive review of the Show Pieces' theatrical cut, Kim Newman writing for Screen Daily opined "a distinctively British spin on the red-curtained night-spots in another dimension which recur in the work of David Lynch... that it’s as bewildering as it is beguiling is as much down to the essential nature of the vision as it is the fact that it’s a work in progress."

Writing in The Guardian Ben Child described the films, "Defiantly avante garde, this louche and oddly sinister vignette suggests that Moore, as a film-maker, is determinedly disinterested in regurgitating his own comic-book back catalogue: we're definitely not in Smallville any more."

Little White Lies listed Show Pieces as one of the best films at Frightfest 2014. Anton Bitel of Little White Lies wrote "this Midlands memento mori remains a genuine curiosity, matching a strong sense of place to a mood all its own – and all its clownishness is a mere masquerade for something far more grave (or should that be the other way around?)."

Martin Kudlac writing in Mubi's 2015 Writer's Poll compared Moore's Show Pieces to Alejandro Jodorowsky's The Holy Mountain, "Because Jodorowsky migrated from moving pictures onto sequential art and it was a wise career change; and Alan Moore succumbed to the moving pictures siren call and provided a mystical experience."

== Festivals and Screenings ==
In December 2012 "Jimmy’s End" was shown at the location it was filmed, the hall at St James’ End Working Men's Club.

"Act of Faith" and "Jimmy's End" were shown together at BAFICI in Buenos Aires in three screenings between 12 and 21 April 2013, and screened at Latitude Festival in June 2013, introduced in person by Mitch Jenkins and Alan Moore who were then interviewed by Adam Curtis.

The 77 minute long theatrical cut of Show Pieces was premiered at Film4 Frightfest in August 2014. The theatrical cut was also an official selection at Raindance Film Festival in September, Sitges Film Festival in October and Leeds International Film Festival in November where it was shown at Leeds Town Hall followed by a question and answer session with Mitch Jenkins and Alan Moore.

Show Pieces was screened at Graphic Festival at Sydney Opera House and The Barbican, London in 2016 to mark the release of the digital home video.

== Home media ==
In 2014 Lex released a box set including a DVD of all films, a separate book of storyboard illustrations by Kristian Hammerstad and the original screenplay and a CD of the soundtrack.

The films were made available to purchase as a digital download from Amazon, Hulu, the iTunes Store and other digital media retailers in May 2016. Show Pieces was licensed exclusively for subscription streaming to Shudder in July 2017.

== Soundtrack ==
The soundtrack for each of the short films was written and performed by Adam Drucker and Andrew Broder with lyrics by Alan Moore and numerous collaborations with musicians and vocalists including Alan Sparhawk and Tunde Adebimpe.

== Sequel ==
In July 2014, Moore completed the screenplay for a feature film titled The Show, which continues the story of Show Pieces. The film was shot in 2018 and was an official selection for SXSW 2020. The feature film stars Tom Burke and Ellie Bamber in addition to much of the Show Pieces cast including Darrell D'Silva, Siobhan Hewlett and Alan Moore reprising their roles from the short films.
