= Ampadu =

Ampadu is a surname. Notable people with the surname include:

- Ethan Ampadu (born 2000), Welsh footballer
- Kwame Ampadu (born 1970), English footballer
- Michael Ampadu (born 1997), Ghanaian footballer
- Naana Agyei-Ampadu, British actress of Ghanaian descent
- Nana Ampadu (1945–2021), Ghanaian musician
