= Siobhan Hewlett =

British-born Irish actress, writer, producer, poet and artist

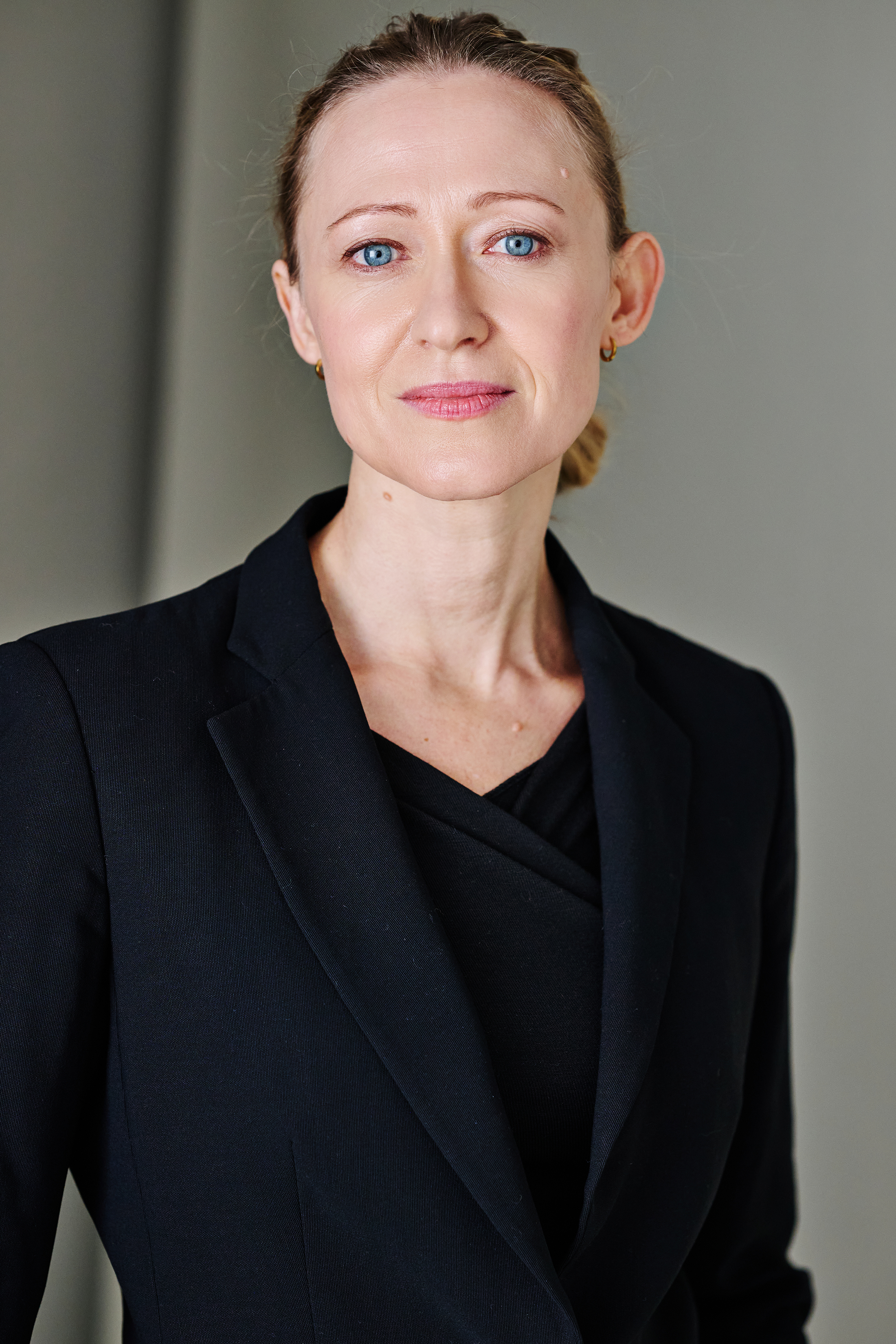
Siobhán Hewlett portrait by Ruth Crafer

Siobhan Hewlett (born 15 April 1983) is an Anglo Irish film, television, radio and theatre actress, writer, producer, poet and artist. Her acting credits include Monsieur N (2003), The Canterbury Tales (2003), The Philanthropist (2005), The Virgin Queen (2005), Irina Palm (2007), Torchwood (2008), Hotel Babylon (2009), Henry VIII: The Mind of a Tyrant (2009), Sherlock (2010), Bonded by Blood (2011), Hummingbird (2013), Brakes (2016), The Show (2021), and McDonald & Dodds (2021).

== Biography ==
Hewlett's father, Donald Hewlett, was an actor who starred in It Ain't Half Hot Mum and other sitcoms, and her mother, Thérèse McMurray, was a child star. She was the lead in the hospital-based drama Emergency Ward 10, and star of Dad's Army, and Are You Being Served.

Educated in England on art scholarships, Hewlett attended Wellesley House School, Downe House School, and The King's School, Canterbury. A period of family ill health during Siobhán's childhood meant that she became her family's main carer. She won a scholarship to study acting at the Webber Douglas Academy of Dramatic Art in London, for a 3-year classical acting diploma course.

Hewlett was brought up between the West of Ireland (Lahinch) and the East Kent coast of England (Whitstable).

Hewlett studied playwriting at the Royal Court Theatre's Young Writers program under playwright Simon Stephens. She also spent some time in Los Angeles, attending The Groundlings improv school as well as performing with L.A. Theatre Works.

== Career ==
Whilst still at drama school at 19, Hewlett was chosen by French film director Antoine de Caunes to play the leading role in Monsieur N, a role that required she learn French. Shortly afterward, she starred in the British comedy series Fortysomething, opposite Hugh Laurie and Benedict Cumberbatch, for ITV.

Hewlett made her professional stage debut at The Finborough Theatre in London, starring opposite Chris O'Dowd, Clarke Peters, and Daniela Nardini in Etta Jenks. She found further success in 1999, when starring opposite Dame Julie Walters and Bill Nighy, in BBC BAFTA winning The Canterbury Tales.

In 2005, Hewlett made her West end stage debut at the Donmar Warehouse, starring alongside Simon Russell Beale, in the Christopher Hampton hit play The Philanthropist, To rave reviews, “ The luscious & accomplished Araminta was played by the luscious & accomplished Siobhán Hewlett, whose electrifying stage presence would have stolen any other show.” - The Independent. The show was nominated the 2006 South Bank show award for Theatre.

In 2007, she starred in the indie hit Irina Palm, opposite Marianne Faithfull and Kevin Bishop which won the audience prize at The Berlin international Film Festival. Hewlett continued working with Cumberbatch when she guest starred in the first episode of award-winning Sherlock and hit series Parades End.

Hewlett has worked with comic book writer Alan Moore (Watchmen, V for Vendetta) and photographer/director Mitch Jenkins. Hewlett starred as journalist Faith Harrington in a series of occult noir films – the first of which, was 'Act of Faith'. Hewlett became exec producer on the series, 'Showpieces' and subsequent feature, The Show starring opposite Tom Burke as Fletcher Dennis.

In 2020, Hewlett began collaborating with Neil Gaiman re imagining one of his short stories into a feature film.

== Theatre ==
Hewlett's theatre credits include Araminta in The Philanthropist at the Donmar Warehouse with Simon Russell Beale Kitty in Etta Jenks at the Finborough Theatre with Chris O'Dowd, Daniela Nardini and Clarke Peters, directed by Che Walker; Ginny in Relatively Speaking with Peter Bowles; The Waltz of the Toreadors at Chichester Festival Theatre directed by Angus Jackson; and Donny's Brain by Rona Munro at Hampstead Theatre opposite Ryan Early.

== Additional works ==
- In 2008, Hewlett had her first exhibition at The Osborne Studio Gallery, Belgravia, London exhibiting her talents as a singer, published artist and poet.
- Hewlett has adapted, is producing and starring in a feature-length adaptation of short story, The Thing About Cassandra by Neil Gaiman.
- Hewlett, alongside old family friend Benedict Cumberbatch, was chosen to represent The Royal Marsden Cancer Charity as one of their ambassadors in 2017.
- She is also a surfer, and plays the guitar.

== Filmography ==
=== Film ===
| Year | Title | Role | Director | Notes |
|---|---|---|---|---|
| 2002 | The Gathering | Janie | Brian Gilbert | |
| 2003 | Monsieur N | Betsy Balcombe | Antoine de Caunes | Nominated for six César Awards |
| 2004 | Piccadilly Jim | Drunk Party Girl | John McKay | |
| 2007 | Irina Palm | Sarah | Sam Garbaski | Winner of the Jury prize at Berlin Film Festival 2007 |
| 2009 | Dread | Quaid's Mother | Anthony DiBlasi | |
| 2011 | Is This a Joke? | Amazing Blonde | Tom Edmunds | |
| 2011 | Act of Faith | Faith Harrington | Mitch Jenkins | |
| 2011 | Bonded by Blood | Julia | Sacha Bennett | |
| 2012 | Jimmy's End | Faith Harrington | Mitch Jenkins | |
| 2013 | Little Favour | Voice and special thanks | Patrick Victor Munro | |
| 2013 | Hummingbird | Tracey | Steven Knight | |
| 2014 | Paddy | Mum | Laurence Spellman and Immanuel von Bennigsen | |
| 2015 | Lotus | | | |
| 2016 | Brakes | Kate | Mercedes Grower | |
| 2016 | Nipplejesus | Sarah | Jake Lushington | |
| 2017 | Country of Hotels | Brenda | Julio Mario Martino | |
| 2020 | The Show | Faith Harrington | Mitch Jenkins | |
| 2022 | The Lost Girls | The original Wendy Darling | | |
| 2024 | The Watchers | Mina's Mother | Ishana Shyalaman | post production |

=== Television ===
| Year | Title | Role | Production | Notes |
|---|---|---|---|---|
| 2003 | Fortysomething | Lucy Proek | ITV | |
| 2003 | The Canterbury Tales | Karen | BBC | |
| 2004 | Midsomer Murders | Amanda | ITV | |
| 2005 | The Virgin Queen | Cecily | BBC | |
| 2007 | M.I. High | Sonya Frost | BBC | |
| 2007 | Lilies | Harriet | BBC | |
| 2007 | New Tricks | Imogen Glover | BBC | |
| 2008 | Torchwood | Harriet | BBC | |
| 2009 | Hotel Babylon | Isabel | BBC | |
| 2009 | Trinity | Claudette | Rough Cut | |
| 2009 | Henry VIII: The Mind of a Tyrant | Catherine of Aragon | Channel 4 | |
| 2010 | Sherlock | Helen | BBC | |
| 2011 | Pete versus Life | Mel | Channel 4 | |
| 2012 | The Syndicate | Hotel receptionist | ITV | |
| 2012 | Parade's End | Michaelangelo woman | HBO | |
| 2013 | The Syndicate 2 | Olivia Goldsmith | BBC | |
| 2017 | When All Is Said And Done – ABBA BIOPIC | Agnetha Faltskog (younger) | ITV | |
| 2021 | McDonald & Dodds – 'The War of Rose' | Nurse Penny Haggard | ITV | |
| 2021 | The Holiday | Chalkboard | | |

=== Theatre ===
| Year | Title | Theatre | Role | Notes |
|---|---|---|---|---|
| 2004 | Etta Jenks | Finborough Theatre | Kitty and Shelley | With Chris O'Dowd, Clarke Peters and Daniela Nardini |
| 2005 | The Philanthropist | Donmar Warehouse | Araminta | With Simon Russell Beale, Danny Webb and Anna Madeley |
| 2006 | The Taming of the Shrew | Wilton's Music Hall | Bianca | With Oliver Chris and Rachael Stirling |
| 2008 | Waltz of the Toreadors | Chichester Festival Theatre | Sidonie | With Peter Bowles, Maggie Steed and Al Weaver |
| 2009 | Relatively Speaking | Theatre Royal Bath | Ginny | With Peter Bowles |
| 2011 | Drowning on Dry Land | Jermyn Street Theatre | Gail Gilchrist | |
| 2012 | Donny's Brain | Hampstead Theatre | Trish Gail | |

=== Video games ===
| Year | Title | Role | Notes |
|---|---|---|---|
| 2013 | Mass Effect 3 – Citadel DLC | Maya Brooks | |
| 2013 | Ryse: Son of Rome | Septima | |
| 2014 | Dragon Age: Inquisition | Additional voices | |
| 2015 | Final Fantasy XIV: A Realm Reborn | Shiva/Iceheart | Heavensward expansion only |
| 2016 | Song of the Deep | Narrator | |
| 2020 | Battletoads | Dark Queen | |
