= Cat Simmons =

English actress

- Born: 4 May 1980 (age 46); Blackburn, Lancashire, England
- Occupation: Actress

Cat Simmons is an English actress, known for her role as DC Kezia Walker in the long-running ITV drama The Bill, and for starring in Family Affairs as Scarlett Anderson. She also played Sista Twista in Life and Lyrics. She also made appearances in No Angels and Casualty.

The daughter of a singer and nurse, her mother is English and her father is Guyanese.

Simmons trained with the Oldham Theatre Workshop and National Youth Music Theatre and studied at Pleckgate High School, Mathematics and Computing College.

Simmons has worked in numerous stage shows. Her work includes Nancy in Cameron Mackintosh's production of Oliver!, Mary Magdalene in Gale Edwards' Jesus Christ Superstar, the Young Vic's sell-out production of Langston Hughes' Simply Heavenly as Joyce, and the Princess in Aladdin alongside Ian McKellen.

In 2005, Simmons collaborated with music group Three Levels and released a track called "Rock U 2Nite".

Simmons returned to the Young Vic in summer 2009 to appear in Ché Walker's and Arthur Darvil's musical premiere of Been So Long with nu-classic soul singer Omar Lye-Fook. The production then toured to the Edinburgh Fringe Festival to showcase at the Traverse Theatre.

Simmons was cast as Nancy in the 2011-13 UK tour of Oliver!, in the place of Samantha Barks, who was cast as Eponine in the film Les Misérables. Simmons took the role from Birmingham in April 2012, and continued it through to October 2012, finishing in Newcastle.

In 2016 Simmons appeared as Clemmy Staples in the ITV series Midsomer Murders episode 18.4 "A Dying Art".

In 2018, Simmons was announced as part of the cast for the West End production of Come From Away.

In 2024, it was announced Simmons would portray Helene in the London premiere of Natasha, Pierre & The Great Comet of 1812 at Donmar Warehouse.

== Filmography ==
=== TV & Film ===
| Year | Work | Role | Notes |
|---|---|---|---|
| 2002 | Doctors | Louise Clark | Episode: "I Spy" |
| 2003 | The Afternoon Play | Beccy | Episode: "Girls' Weekend" |
| 2003 | Holby City | Lorna McKay | Episode: "As the Day Is Long" |
| 2005 | Family Affairs | Scarlett Anderson | TV series |
| 2005 | Doctors | Tina Fisher | Episode: "Grandmother" |
| 2006 | No Angels | Temp HCA | Episode: "3.3" |
| 2006 | Life and Lyrics | Sista Twista | |
| 2006–2009 | The Bill | Kezia Walker | Regular role (series 22–25) |
| 2009 | Leipzig Homicide | Kezia Walker | Episode: "Entführung in London" |
| 2010, 2015 | Casualty | Tania Chester, Lena Marshall | Episodes: "Making Other Plans", "The Road Not Taken" |
| 2011 | Postcode | Marsha | TV film |
| 2013 | Holby City | Victoria Conville | Episode: "Make or Break" |
| 2014 | Macbeth | Witch | Globe Theatre |
| 2014 | That Day We Sang | Berni Inn Waitress | TV film |
| 2014 | Doctors | Maya Geraghty | Episode: "A Law Unto Themselves" |
| 2015 | Vera | Lisa | Episode: "Muddy Waters" |
| 2015 | Ordinary Lies | Emma | Supporting role (series 1) |
| 2017 | Silent Hours | DC June Francis | Film |
| 2016 | Midsomer Murders | Clemmy Staples | Episode: "A Dying Art" |
| 2016 | A Silent Night | Rosie Blackwell | Short |
| 2017 | Doctors | Maxine Daniels | Episode: "Tendrils" |
| 2018 | Moving On | Caroline | Episode: "Invisible" |
| 2018 | Holby City | Becky Cotter | Episodes: "Not Your Home Now", "No Matter Where You Go, There You Are: Parts 1 & 2" |
| 2019 | Killing Eve | Carleen | Episode: "I Hope You Like Missionary!" |
| 2020 | Doctors | DC Georgia Townsend | Episode: "No Exit" |
| 2022 | The Holiday | Izzy | 4 episodes |
| 2025 | Out There | Robyn | 2 episodes |
| 2025 | Grace | Charlotte Seward | Episode: "Dead at First Sight" |

=== Theatre Credits ===
| Year | Title | Role | Theatre | Location |
|---|---|---|---|---|
| 1998-99 | Jesus Christ Superstar | Soul Girl | —N/a | UK National Tour |
| 2003-04 | Simply Heavenly | Joyce | Young Vic | London |
| 2009 | Been So Long | Simone | Young Vic | London |
| 2012 | Oliver! (musical) | Nancy | —N/a | UK National Tour |
| 2019-21 | Come from Away | Hannah & Others | Phoenix Theatre, London | West End |
| 2024-25 | Natasha, Pierre & The Great Comet of 1812 | Helene | Donmar Warehouse | Off West End |
