= The Philanthropist (play) =

1970 play written by Christopher Hampton

- Original language: English
- Written by: Christopher Hampton
- Subject: The Misanthrope

Premiere
- Date: August 3, 1970 (London), March 15, 1971 (Broadway)
- Place: Ethel Barrymore Theatre, Broadway, New York City, New York

The Philanthropist is a play by Christopher Hampton, written as a response to Molière's The Misanthrope. After opening at the Royal Court Theatre, London in August 1970, the piece, directed by Robert Kidd, transferred to the May Fair Theatre in the West End and ran there for over three years, subsequently going on a regional tour in 1974. In the meantime, the play, directed once again by Kidd, premiered on Broadway in March 1971, running till May of the same year. Kidd had previously collaborated with Hampton on When Did You Last See Your Mother? (1964), which had also been staged at the Royal Court Theatre.

Described by Hampton as a "bourgeois comedy", the piece is set in an "English University Town". The Philanthropist demonstrated Hampton's ability "to write witty, subtle and revealing dialogue."

== Plot ==
A CurtainUp! review gave the following summary:

The prelude to the play is so very clever and it must have marked out the young Christopher Hampton for notice. It reminded me of [Tom] Stoppard's The Real Thing when everything isn't as it seems and the audience are strung along. Philip and Donald are in a tutorial with a student, John, discussing John's play which has a dramatic but unbelievable ending. The first act continues in Philip's rooms in college where his fiancée Celia is cooking dinner for six. First on the guest list is fellow don, and English lecturer, Donald, colleague and confidant of Philip. They are to be joined by a writer, Braham, Araminta and Liz. After a pairing off with lifts offered home, the six mix and meld. The next morning they reap the aftermath of the previous night's sexual activity or even inactivity.

== Productions ==
The original Royal Court Theatre production opened in August 1970. After five weeks it transferred directly to the May Fair Theatre and remained there until late 1973.

The Philanthropist premiered on Broadway at the Ethel Barrymore Theatre on March 15, 1971, following previews from March 11. As in London, the cast featured Alec McCowen in the lead role. David Merrick and Michael Codron produced.

The Broadway production ran for 64 performances, closing on May 15, 1971. The New York Times described it as "a good evening of high-class theatrical highjinks that says more than might be seen on the surface". The show was nominated for three Tony Awards, including the 1971 Tony Award for Best Play, and McCowen won a Drama Desk Award for Outstanding Performance. Robert Kidd directed the production, which featured set design by John Gunter, costumes by Sara Brook, and lighting by Lloyd Burlingame.

The first US revival opened at the Manhattan Theatre Club on September 27, 1983, playing a limited engagement run until November 20, 1983. The play has been produced regionally many times, including the Bench Theatre Group's 1978 production at the Havant Arts Centre in Havant, Hampshire, and in Duluth, Minnesota in March 2003.

A major London revival was staged by Kenneth Ives at Wyndham's Theatre in 1991; with Edward Fox in the lead, it ran from May to October. A further revival was directed by David Grindley at the Donmar Warehouse, running from September to October 15, 2005, and starring Simon Russell Beale as Philip with Anna Madeley as Celia and Siobhan Hewlett as Araminta.

In 2009 the Roundabout Theatre Company produced a revival starring Matthew Broderick, which opened on April 26 at the American Airlines Theatre in New York City. The revival met with mixed reviews and closed on June 28, 2009, after 73 performances. This production was directed by David Grindley; sets were by Tim Shortall, lighting was by Rick Fisher, and costumes were by Tobin Ost, with sound design by Gregory Clarke.

In 2017 it was revived at London's Trafalgar Studios, directed by Simon Callow, with a cast including Simon Bird, Matt Berry, Charlotte Ritchie, Lily Cole and Tom Rosenthal.

A BBC television adaptation, starring Ronald Pickup as Philip, Helen Mirren as Celia and James Bolam as Don, was screened in October 1975 and is contained in a 6 DVD set of Mirren's work for the BBC.

== Characters and casts ==
Casts of major productions

Character	1971 original Broadway	1975 TV Film	2005 London revival	2009 Roundabout revival	2017 London revival
Philip	Alec McCowen	Ronald Pickup	Simon Russell Beale	Matthew Broderick	Simon Bird
Braham	Victor Spinetti	Charles Gray	Simon Paisley Day	Jonathan Cake	Matt Berry
Liz	Carolyn Lagerfelt	Amanda Knott	Bernadette Russell	—N/a	Lowenna Melrose
Elizabeth	—N/a	—N/a	—N/a	Samantha Soule	—N/a
John	Paul Corum	Colin Higgins	Simon Bubb	Tate Ellington	John Seaward
Celia	Jane Asher	Helen Mirren	Anna Madeley	Anna Madeley	Charlotte Ritchie
Araminta	Penelope Wilton	Jacqueline Pearce	Siobhan Hewlett	Jennifer Mudge	Lily Cole
Donald	Ed Zimmermann	James Bolam	Danny Webb	Steven Weber	Tom Rosenthal

Note: In later versions of the piece, "Elizabeth" replaced the character "Liz".

== Awards and nominations ==
1970 Theatre Critics Awards

- Best New Play (winner)

1971 Tony Awards

- Best Play (nominee)
- Best Actor in Play (McCowen, nominee)
- Best Featured Actor in a Play (Zimmermann, nominee)

1971 Drama Desk Awards

- Outstanding Performance (McCowen, winner)

2005 Evening Standard Awards

- Best Actor (Beale, winner)

2006 Critics' Circle Awards

- Best Actor (Beale, winner)
