= Henry VIII: The Mind of a Tyrant =

2009 British television documentary series

Henry VIII: The Mind of a Tyrant is a history documentary series on Henry VIII of England presented by David Starkey. It was first broadcast on Channel 4 from 6 to 27 April 2009.

== Episodes ==
1. Prince (1485–1509) – Henry's childhood and youth, prior to his accession
2. Warrior (1509–1525) – Henry's continental military ambitions, the Battle of the Spurs and their final frustration by Charles V, Holy Roman Emperor and the battle of Pavia, followed by the Field of the Cloth of Gold
3. Lover (1526–1536) – Henry's love affair and marriage with Anne Boleyn, the annulment of his marriage with Catherine of Aragon, and Anne's fall and execution
4. Tyrant (1533–1547) – Henry's totalitarian religious and secular policies, as influenced by Anne and others, the Dissolution of the Monasteries, the Pilgrimage of Grace, the Device Forts, the foundation of the Royal Navy, the English Reformation, the Great Bible, the Six Articles, his final three wives, and the fate of his tomb effigy (melted down by Oliver Cromwell) and coffin (now containing Horatio Nelson)

== Selected cast ==
- Roger Ashton-Griffiths - Cardinal Thomas Wolsey
- Ken Bones – Erasmus
- Siobhan Hewlett – Catherine of Aragon
- Sophie Hunter – Anne Boleyn
- Ryan Kiggell – Thomas More
- Laurence Spellman, Adam James,
- Ian Redford – Henry VIII
- David Oakes – George Cavendish
- Nick Sampson – Thomas Cromwell
- Andrew Havill – Eustace Chapuys
- Graham Turner – Robert Aske
