= Rebecca Root =

English actress and stand-up comedian

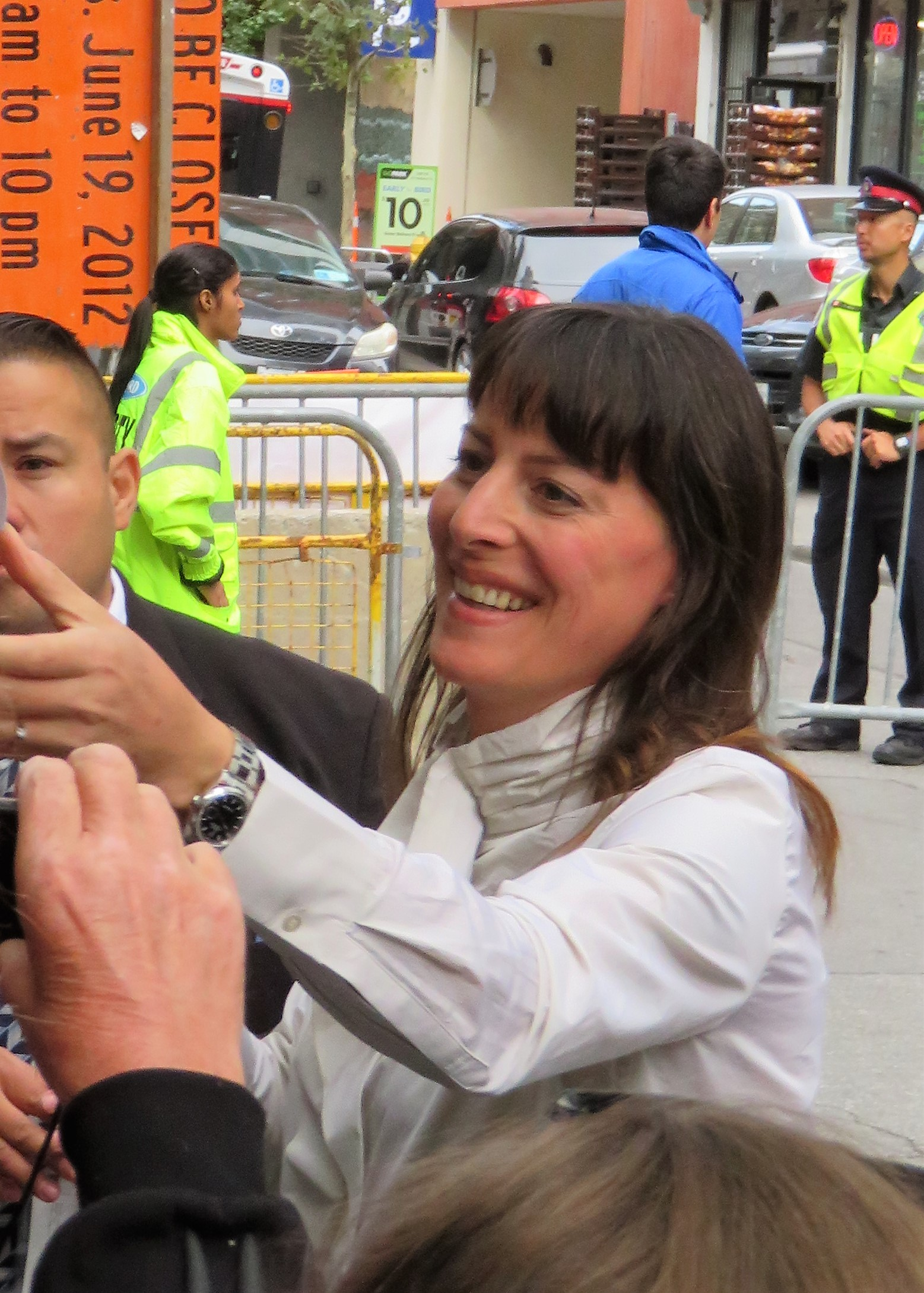
- Root at the 2018 Toronto Film Festival
- Born: Woking, Surrey, England
- Education: Royal Central School of Speech and Drama
- Occupations: Actress; comedian; voice coach
- Years active: 1995–present
- Website: rebeccaroot.co.uk

Rebecca Root is an English actress, comedian and voice coach. She is most well-known for playing the leading role in the 2015 BBC Two sitcom Boy Meets Girl. She has performed the role of Siobhan in the National Theatre's touring production of The Curious Incident of the Dog in the Night-Time.

She was rated 18th in The Independent on Sunday's Rainbow List 2014, which named her as an influential transgender actress in mainstream television, alongside others like Alexandra Billings, Laverne Cox and Adèle Anderson.

== Biography ==
Root was born in Woking, Surrey, England. She is the second child of an auxiliary nurse mother, while her father was a banker in Guildford. She has two sisters.

When she was 11 years old, her family moved to rural Oxfordshire where she attended Bartholomew School in Eynsham. Root performed with local drama groups as well as the National Youth Theatre of Great Britain, whose alumni includes actors such as Lucy Briers, Jonathan Cake, and Daniel Craig.

She went on to graduate from the Royal Central School of Speech and Drama with a Master of Arts in Voice Studies in 2012.

== Career ==
After finishing her sixth form education in 1987, Root moved to London full time in order to train as an actor at Mountview Academy of Theatre Arts spent the next decade as a jobbing actor, working in a range of television and theatre productions, notably in TV shows like Keeping Up Appearances and Casualty, and stage plays like The Lady's Not For Burning, Hamlet, and Tartuffe.

Before her breakthrough in 2015 playing a supporting role in the award-winning film The Danish Girl (her debut in film) and a lead role in the groundbreaking BBC Two romantic sitcom Boy Meets Girl, Root considered that she played roles described as "a romantic lead, debonair, knight, a soldier—typically and boringly 'normal.'"

In 2015, Root also starred in the BBC Radio 4 drama 1977, about the popular transgender composer Angela Morley who had become a household name to British radio audiences as Wally Stott. It followed the year in which Morley was enlisted to complete composition of the musical soundtrack to the film Watership Down in three weeks. Root has also appeared in the Doctor Who audio series Stranded, part of the Eighth Doctor Adventures, playing Tania Bell, the Doctor's first transgender companion, and an operative of Torchwood monitoring the Eighth Doctor when he is trapped on Earth due to the TARDIS suffering damage.

Root is also a voice coach, teaching at the East 15 Acting School and from her home in Highgate, London. She started that career after she transitioned from male to female in 2003 and acting work became harder to find. Root also advertises voice therapy lessons specifically for transgender people to help them "find a voice they feel fits their gender".

== Personal life ==
Root is a bisexual transgender woman. She is also an advocate for LGBT rights and is patron for the charities Diversity Role Models and Liberate Jersey.

== Filmography ==
Year	Title	Role	Notes
1995	Keeping Up Appearances	The Engineer	Episode: "Hyacinth Is Alarmed"
1997	Casualty	Psychiatric SHO	2 episodes
2012	Normal: Real Stories from the Sex Industry	Cynthia	Film premiered at the 2012 Raindance Film Festival
2015–2016	Boy Meets Girl	Judy	BBC TV series
2015	1977	Angela Morley	BBC Radio 4 drama
2015	The Danish Girl	Lili's nurse	Root auditioned for the role of the transgender character Lili Elbe, but the role was given to actor Eddie Redmayne, with Root being given the role of Lili's nurse
2017	Doctor Who: Zaltys	Sable	Big Finish Doctor Who audio drama
2017–2018	Doctors	Samantha Eustace	4 episodes
2018	Colette	Rachilde	
2018	The Sisters Brothers	Mayfield	
2018	The Romanoffs	Dana	Episode: "The One That Holds Everything"
2019	Moominvalley	Misabel (voice)	Episode #1.1
2019	Flack	Allie Gregs	Episode: "Dan"
2019	Gallifrey: Time War 2	Cantico	Big Finish audio drama boxset
2020	Doctor Who: Stranded	Tania Bell	Big Finish Doctor Who audio drama boxset
2020	The Queen's Gambit	Miss Lonsdale	2 episodes
2021	Creation Stories	Victoria	
2022	This is Christmas	Miranda	Film
2022	The Rising	DS Diana Aird	
2023–2024	Heartstopper	Principal Edwards	3 episodes
2024	Monsieur Spade	Cynthia Fitzsimmons	6 episodes
2026	Heartstopper Forever	Principal Edwards	Cameo (Television film)
