= Khandie Khisses =

Born (23 April) Khandie Khisses is a British burlesque performer, photographer and actor. She was consistently voted into the top 50 burlesque stars by the general public in 2009, 2010, and 2011 and 2012 and was also ranked among the top 20 UK Burlesque Performer. Additionally, she is a regular columnist for 21st Century Burlesque and Pinup America, and has contributed guest columns to Bleeding Cool.

Khandie's first film, Jimmy's End, written by comic book creator Alan Moore and directed by Mitch Jenkins, was released in 2012. Her second film, 'His Heavy Heart' also written by Alan Moore and Mitch Jenkins, was set for release in Summer 2014.

== Career ==
Having started her career in the Royal Air Force in 2004 before leaving to pursue a career as a glamour showgirl. Originally performing under the name 'Morning Glory' though no records of this stage name can be found, she later adopted the name 'Khandie Khisses'. Her first performance took place in late 2005, and since then, she has been invited to perform at events such as the Zandra Rhodes Fashion & Textiles Museum, The British Science Festival, Australian Burlesque Festival and the Paris Burlesque Festival.

One of her more notable performances is her underwater mermaid art installation.

An accomplished writer, her journalistic work features regular columns for burlesque industry online magazine, 21st Century Burlesque Online. She has previously written for Bleeding Cool and Coochie Crunch.
