= The Adventures of Brigadier Wellington-Bull =

1959 British TV sitcom

- Genre: Sitcom
- Starring: Alexander Gauge; Valerie Singleton; Donald Hewlett
- Country of origin: United Kingdom
- No. of episodes: 5

Production
- Running time: 30 minutes

Original release
- Network: BBC Television Service
- Release: 12 June – 17 July 1959

The Adventures of Brigadier Wellington-Bull is a 1959 black-and-white British sitcom starring Alexander Gauge and Valerie Singleton. Written by Austin Melford, only one series of five 30-minute episodes was produced.

== Cast ==
- Alexander Gauge as Brigadier Garnet Wellington-Bull
- Valerie Singleton as Jane Wellington-Bull
- Donald Hewlett as Captain "Sooty" Pilkington

== Plot ==
The Adventures of Brigadier Wellington-Bull followed the adventures of a retired Army Brigadier, Garnet Wellington-Bull, who is trying to come to terms with civilian life. The other characters were his daughter Jane and Captain Pilkington, a young officer who used to serve under him.

== Episodes ==
1. Episode One: "A Fruitful Business" (12 June 1959)
2. Episode Two: "A Guardian Angel" (19 June 1959)
3. Episode Three: "A Clubbable Man" (26 June 1959)
4. Episode Four: "A Party Matter" (3 July 1959)
5. Episode Five: "A Spicy Dish" (17 July 1959)
