= First Day on Earth =

Upcoming British television series

- Genre: Drama
- Created by: Michaela Coel
- Written by: Michaela Coel
- Directed by: Michaela Coel; Sam Miller
- Starring: Michaela Coel; Thandiwe Newton; Ncuti Gatwa; Danny Sapani; Maxine Peake
- Countries of origin: United States; United Kingdom
- Original language: English
- No. of series: 1
- No. of episodes: 10

Production
- Executive producers: Michaela Coel; Jesse Armstrong; Jo McLellan; Piers Wenger; Phil Clarke; Roberto Troni; Sam Miller
- Producer: Johann Knobel
- Running time: 57 minutes
- Production companies: Various Artists Limited; A24

Original release
- Network: BBC One; HBO

First Day on Earth is an upcoming BBC One and HBO television series written by and starring Michaela Coel, who is also co-director alongside Sam Miller. The main cast also includes Thandiwe Newton, Ncuti Gatwa, Danny Sapani and Maxine Peake.

== Premise ==
British novelist Henri is stuck. Work has dried up, her relationship is going nowhere. So when she's offered a job on a film in Ghana, West Africa - her parents' homeland, where her estranged father lives - she can't resist the chance to reconnect with him and the country of her heritage.

But when she arrives neither the job nor her father turn out the way she expected, and soon Henri has to deal with danger and hypocrisy, form new friendships, lose her illusions, and create a new sense of identity - one that might leave her stronger, but could also break her.

== Cast ==
=== Main ===
- Michaela Coel as Henri
- Thandiwe Newton as Anya
- Ncuti Gatwa as Darren
- Danny Sapani as Ernest
- Maxine Peake as Helen

=== Supporting ===
- Bukky Bakray as Sunny
- Rakie Ayola as Maame
- Ama Serwah Genfi as Nana
- Adam Lundgren as Asger
- Daniella Arthur-Kennedy as Gladys
- Jameel Buari as Ronald
- Sam Delich as Klubeck
- Fisayo Akinade as Adekunle
- Dan Skinner as Steve
- Kobna Holdbrook-Smith as Chris
- Ray BLK as Jacqueline
- Michael Owusu Addo as Sarkodie
- Joselyn Dumas as Jessica
- Sister Deborah as Ama
- Adjetey Anang as Edmund
- Akofa Edjeani as Athena
- Roselyn Ngissah as Eresi
- Akrobeto as Honam
- Godwin Namboe as a police officer
- Lady Jay as herself

== Production ==
=== Development ===
The series was commissioned by the BBC in 2024 and is written and executive produced by Michaela Coel, who also leads the cast. Phil Clarke, Roberto Troni also executive produce alongside Jesse Armstrong for Various Artists Limited, as does Jo McClellan for the BBC and Piers Wenger for A24. Coel is also a director on the series with Sam Miller as co-director and executive producer, with Johann Knobel as series producer.

=== Casting ===
In February 2026, it was announced that Thandiwe Newton, Ncuti Gatwa, Danny Sapani and Maxine Peake were added to the main cast alongside Coel. In April 2026, additional cast members joined including Rakie Ayola, Bukky Bakray, Ray BLK, Dan Skinner, Sam Delich, Amaarae, Michael Owusu Addo, Joselyn Dumas, Sister Deborah, Adjetey Anang, Akofa Edjeani, Roselyn Ngissah, Akrobeto, Godwin Namboe, and Lady Jay.

=== Filming ===
Filming on the series started by early 2026.

== Release ==
The series is anticipated to air on BBC One and BBC iPlayer in 2027.
