= Robert Kidd =

Robert Kidd (23 Feb 1943 - 18 July 1980) was a Scottish theatre director. He is best known for his work at the Royal Court Theatre in London, England.

== Biography ==
Kidd collaborated several times with Christopher Hampton. In 1964 Kidd and Hampton began together at the Royal Court Theatre with When Did You Last See Your Mother, which transferred to the Comedy Theatre. They later worked on Total Eclipse (1969), The Philanthropist (1974), Savages (1974), and Treats (1975).

Kidd then directed David Storey¹s The Restoration of Arnold Middleton (1967). In 1968, one of his projects, Oscar Wilde's The Picture of Dorian Gray with James Fox, fell through. However, Jim Dine, who was working on drawings for the poster, came up with his famous series Bathrobes.

He returned to at the Royal Court Theatre in 1975 for two years as joint artistic director of the English Stage Company with Nicholas Wright and continued his association with Christopher Hampton and David Storey. He directed Storey's Mothers Day (1976). When he left the Royal Court, he had assignments at the National Theatre with Lost Worlds (1978) and at Greenwich. Middle-Age Spread, staged in 1979 at the Lyric Theatre, was still running when he died.

== Personal life ==
Kidd was born in Edinburgh in 1943 and educated at Boroughmuir High School. He married Jennifer Sieff (later Johnson), step-daughter of Joseph Sieff.
