= The Lightning Child =

- Original language: English
- Written by: Ché Walker (with music by Arthur Darvill)
- Characters: Dionysus, Pentheus, Agave

Premiere
- Date: September 14, 2013
- Place: Shakespeare's Globe
- Official website

The Lightning Child is a 2013 play by Ché Walker, freely adapting The Bacchae by Euripides. Its premiere production at Shakespeare's Globe in London ran from 14 September to 12 October 2013 - the same theatre has previously put on Walker's The Frontline.

The play includes songs by Arthur Darvill, who has also collaborated with Walker on The Frontline and the 2009 musical Been So Long. Darvill had to recommence work on the score from scratch in October 2012 after his laptop was stolen.

== Plot ==
Neil Armstrong prepares to set out for the moon, despite the pleadings of his wife not to go. On arriving there, he discovered Dionysus's transgender herald, who begins to tell him the story of Pentheus and Dionysus. Cadmus meets Tiresias, preparing to go to worship Dionysus. They are stopped by Pentheus, who announces his decision to extirpate Dionysus and his cult.

Dionysus appears to his maenads and the herald describes the story of Ampelos. One of Pentheus' soldiers arrives and Dionysus (pretending to be one of his own priests, rather than the god himself) allows himself to be arrested and taken to Pentheus. A shepherd arrives to tell Pentheus of the behaviour of the maenads and Pentheus' mother Agave, especially their superhuman strength when attacked.

Pentheus announces his wish to see the Dionysian rites and is disguised as a woman. After watching for a while, he is ripped to shreds by the maenads, led by Agave. She describes her meeting with Echion and the conception and birth of Pentheus, before she is turned into a snake by Dionysus in vengeance for her treatment of his mother Semele.

=== Subplots ===
The main plot is also interwoven with four shorter plays. The first describes two heroin addicts and their attempts to escape their addiction through a stolen pit bull. The second describes two female flatmates, one a professional violinist and the other a fan of Billie Holiday. The third examines Caster Semenya and her gender-testing at the 2009 World Championships in Athletics, relating it to Dionysus' ambiguous gender and Pentheus' disguise as a woman. The fourth tells of Holiday and her reconciliation with Lester Young behind the scenes at The Sound of Jazz in 1957.
