= Boy Meets Girl (2015 TV series) =

- Photo released by the BBC from shooting Boy Meets Girl, showing (left-to-right) Welch, Root and Hepple
- Genre: Sitcom
- Created by: Elliott Kerrigan
- Written by: Elliott Kerrigan; Simon Carlyle; Andrew Mettam
- Directed by: Paul Walker
- Starring: Rebecca Root; Harry Hepple; Denise Welch
- Country of origin: United Kingdom
- Original language: English
- No. of series: 2
- No. of episodes: 12

Production
- Executive producers: Sophie Clarke-Jervoise; Kristian Smith
- Producer: Margot Gavan Duffy
- Production locations: Newcastle upon Tyne, Tyne and Wear, England, UK
- Running time: 28 minutes
- Production companies: BBC; Tiger Aspect Productions

Original release
- Network: BBC Two
- Release: 3 September 2015 – 4 August 2016

Boy Meets Girl is a BBC Two sitcom starring Rebecca Root, Harry Hepple and Denise Welch. It tells the story of the developing relationship between 26-year-old Leo (Hepple) and 40-year-old Judy (Root). The script, by Elliott Kerrigan, was discovered through the Trans Comedy Award, a 2013 BBC talent search for scripts with positive portrayals of transgender characters.

Both Root and her character Judy are transgender, making this the first BBC comedy to feature transgender issues prominently, and the first sitcom to star a transgender actor. Sophie Clarke-Jervoise, the executive producer, stated "we always knew we had to get a trans actress – I don't think we auditioned anyone who wasn't trans for the role. It just didn't feel right."

The first series of six episodes aired between 3 September and 8 October 2015. A second and final series began airing from 6 July to 4 August 2016. It comprises six episodes.

== Episodes ==
Series 1
No. overall	No. in series	Title	Original release date
1	1	"Episode 1"	3 September 2015
2	2	"Episode 2"	10 September 2015
3	3	"Episode 3"	17 September 2015
4	4	"Episode 4"	24 September 2015
5	5	"Episode 5"	1 October 2015
6	6	"Episode 6"	8 October 2015

Series 2
No. overall	No. in series	Title	Original release date
7	1	"Episode 1"	6 July 2016
8	2	"Episode 2"	13 July 2016
9	3	"Episode 3"	20 July 2016
10	4	"Episode 4"	27 July 2016
11	5	"Episode 5"	3 August 2016
12	6	"Episode 6"	4 August 2016

== Background and production ==
In January 2012, All About Trans organized an event, "Trans Camp", involving people from the trans community and media, and aiming to help the media provide accurate depictions of transgender people. Off the back of this, the BBC ran a talent search later that year, the Trans Comedy Award, offering comedy writers up to £5000 for scripts with positive portrayals of transgender characters. The BBC received 320 script entries, with the winners being Boy Meets Girl (then titled Love) by Elliott Kerrigan and Nobody's Perfect by Tom Glover.

Boy Meets Girl was created by Elliott Kerrigan, and written by Kerrigan, Simon Carlyle, and Andrew Mettam. It stars Rebecca Root as Judy, Harry Hepple as Leo, Denise Welch as Pam (Leo's mother). Also appearing are Janine Duvitski, Nigel Betts, Lizzie Roper, and Jonny Dixon. It is directed by Paul Walker. The producer is Margot Gavan Duffy, and the executive producers are Sophie Clarke-Jervoise for Tiger Aspect and Kristian Smith for the BBC.

A pilot episode was shown at the BBC's Salford Sitcom Showcase in March 2014, and the show was commissioned after that. The main series acquired co-writers Simon Carlyle and Andrew Mettam, and had six 30-minute episodes (including the pilot episode with some re-shot scenes) set and recorded in Newcastle upon Tyne.

The theme tune is "Meet Me on the Corner" by Lindisfarne.

== Reception ==
After the pilot episode aired, The Independent compared Boy Meets Girl to the award-winning BBC comedy Gavin & Stacey, a comparison the BBC had said they were looking to make.

On the topic of having a trans woman character played by a trans woman, Paris Lees wrote in The Guardian, "About bloody time" and "It's great to see trans folk bringing authenticity to roles ... [Comedy] is at its best when it helps us to understand a complex and often cruel world by laughing at our own, previously unexamined, prejudices. I haven't seen Boy Meets Girl yet, but it has already put a smile on my face."

Jasper Rees in the newspaper The Daily Telegraph was less impressed, describing the show as "packaged in a demoralisingly traditional form of comedy".

== See also ==
- Boy Meets Girl (2014)
- Different for Girls (1996)
- Transgender in film and television
