= Thérèse McMurray =

Irish-British television actress (born 1947)

Thérèse Ellen McMurray (born 6 July 1947) is an Irish-British television actress.

== Biography ==
McMurray comes from a variety theatre background as both her parents, grandparents and aunts were renowned variety artistes represented by the agents Lew and Leslie Grade. Lew Grade introduced her parents to each other and he and his wife, the singer Kathleen Moody, became McMurray's godparents.

She became Lord Grade's protégé. Under his patronage, she studied for five years at the Italia Conti Academy of Theatre Arts from where she became a successful, leading child actor, later progressing to soap star and celebrity throughout the late 1960s to the early 1980s when she retired from her career to look after her family.

Roles she has performed include Dagmar in an ITV production of I Remember Mama, Nurse Parkin in ATV Emergency Ward 10, and appearances in Hugh and I Spy, Wodehouse Playhouse, Mummy and Daddy, and as Private Walker's girlfriend in a handful of episodes of Dad's Army, as well as the girl in the haystack in the episode The Day the Balloon Went Up. She played a customer in one episode ("The Hand of Fate") of Are You Being Served.

She also appeared in two works by Dennis Potter, a play for ITV, Lay Down Your Arms (1970) and Pennies From Heaven (1978).

In addition to her television career she modeled with Twiggy and was a frequent radio contributor both in the UK and her native Ireland. She met her future husband, actor Donald Hewlett, on the set of Rogues Rock, the 1970s children's television series. The couple wed in 1979 remained married until his death on 4 June 2011. They had a son, Patrick Hewlett (a director) and a daughter, actress Siobhan Hewlett.
