= Been So Long =

Musical

- Music: Arthur Darvill
- Lyrics: Arthur Darvill
- Book: Ché Walker
- Basis: Been So Long by Ché Walker
- Productions: 2009 London; 2009 Scotland

Been So Long is a musical with music and lyrics by Arthur Darvill and book by Ché Walker. The musical is based on Walker's 1998 play of the same name.

Been So Long premiered at the Young Vic on July 11, 2009. It transferred to Traverse Theatre in Edinburgh on August 7, 2009 as part of the Edinburgh Festival. A live cast recording was made of the production at the Young Vic.

== Original Cast ==
- Yvonne - Naana Agyei-Ampadu
- Gil - Harry Hepple
- Raymond - Arinze Kene
- Simone - Cat Simmons
- Barney - Omar Lye-Fook
- Singers - Samantha-Antoinette Smith, Gemma Knight Jones, Jenessa Qua

== Film adaptation ==
A film adaptation, with a screenplay by Che Walker and directed by Tinge Krishnan, was released on Netflix on October 26, 2018. The film stars Michaela Coel as Simone and Arinzé Kene as Raymond.
