= Arthur Darvill =

English actor, composer, and musician

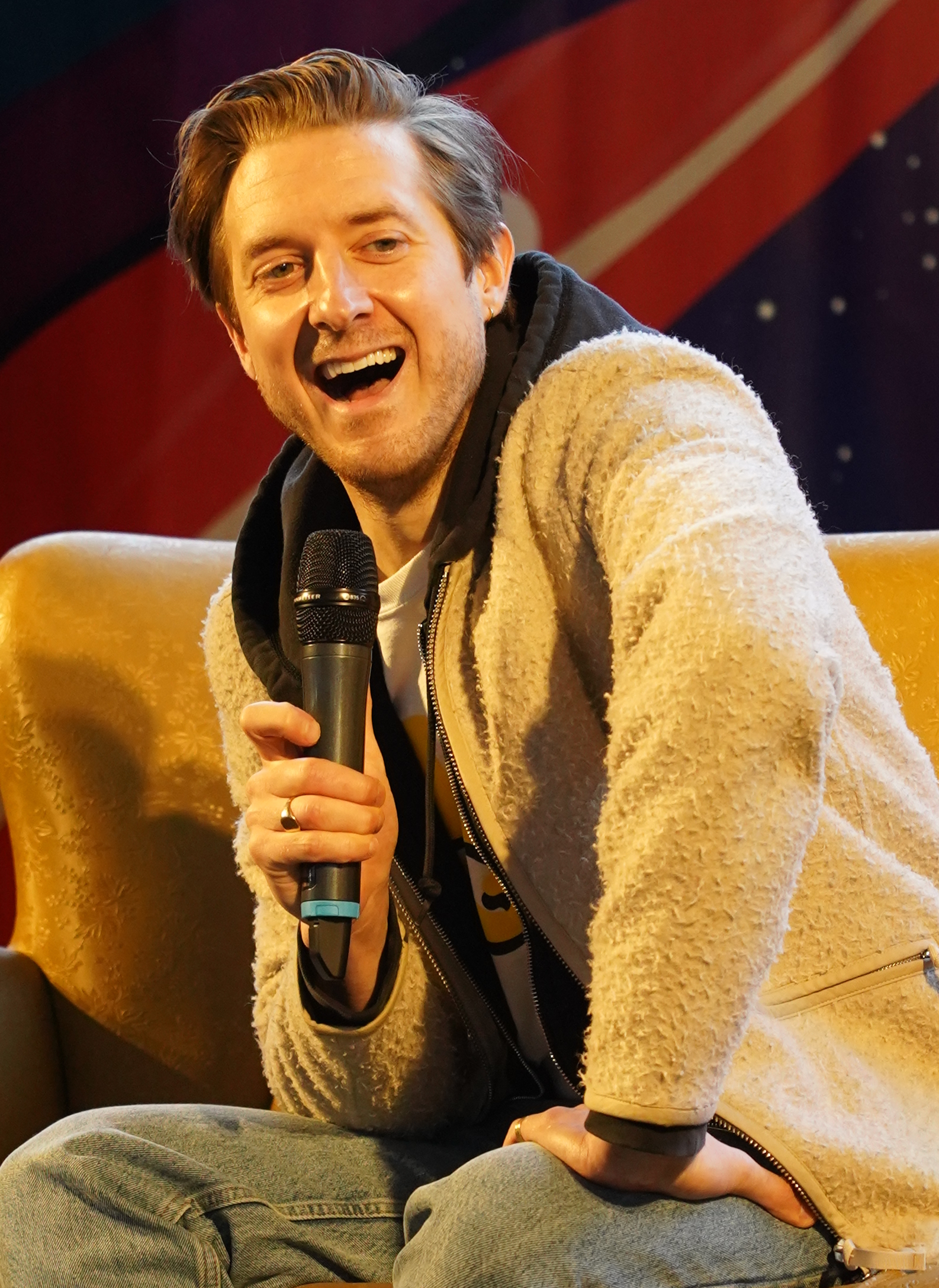
- Arthur Darvill in 2022
- Born: 1981 or 1982; Birmingham, West Midlands, England
- Occupations: Actor, composer
- Spouse: Inès De Clercq (m. 2015)

Arthur Darvill is an English actor, composer, and musician. He is known for portraying Rory Williams, a companion of the Eleventh Doctor in the television series Doctor Who (2010–2012). He is also known for his roles as Rip Hunter in Legends of Tomorrow (2016–2018, 2021) and Rev. Paul Coates in Broadchurch (2013–2017). From 2013 to 2014, he appeared in the lead role, Guy, in the theatre musical Once, during its run in the West End and on Broadway. He also played Curly in the West End revival of Oklahoma!, for which he won the Laurence Olivier Award for Best Actor in a Musical.

== Early life and education ==
Arthur Thomas Darvill was born in 1981 or 1982. His mother toured the world with a puppet theatre when he was a child, and he would sometimes go with her. His father, Nigel, played the Hammond organ for artists including Edwin Starr, Ruby Turner, and Fine Young Cannibals.

Darvill attended Bromsgrove School in Worcestershire from 1993 to 2000. He joined Stage2 Youth Theatre Company at the age of 10. He was a member from 1991 to 2000, and had an early job on CITV in 2000, presenting the continuity links between the shows; during this time he was billed as Tom Darvill.

Darvill learnt to play keyboards and later guitar, and as a teenager formed an indie rock band called Edmund, "after [his] favourite character in The Lion, the Witch and the Wardrobe".

At the age of 21, Darvill moved to London with four friends from youth theatre, each having secured a place at a drama school. They moved into a house in White City together. Darvill trained in acting at the Royal Academy of Dramatic Art, and also trained in stage combat.

== Career ==
Darvill made his professional stage debut playing condemned criminal Harrison in Edmund White's Terre Haute, which ran at the Assembly Rooms during the Edinburgh Festival Fringe. His performance was praised by Nicholas de Jongh of the Evening Standard and Susannah Clapp of The Observer. Darvill appeared in Terre Haute's transfer to Trafalgar Studios in 2007. His performance gained him a Best Newcomer nomination at the 2007 Evening Standard Theatre Awards.

Darvill played Rob in the 2007 monologue Stacy, in a performance The Times described as "compelling". Later that year, he appeared in the Vaudeville Theatre's production of Swimming with Sharks with Christian Slater, Helen Baxendale and Matt Smith (which gained him a London Newcomer Award nomination).

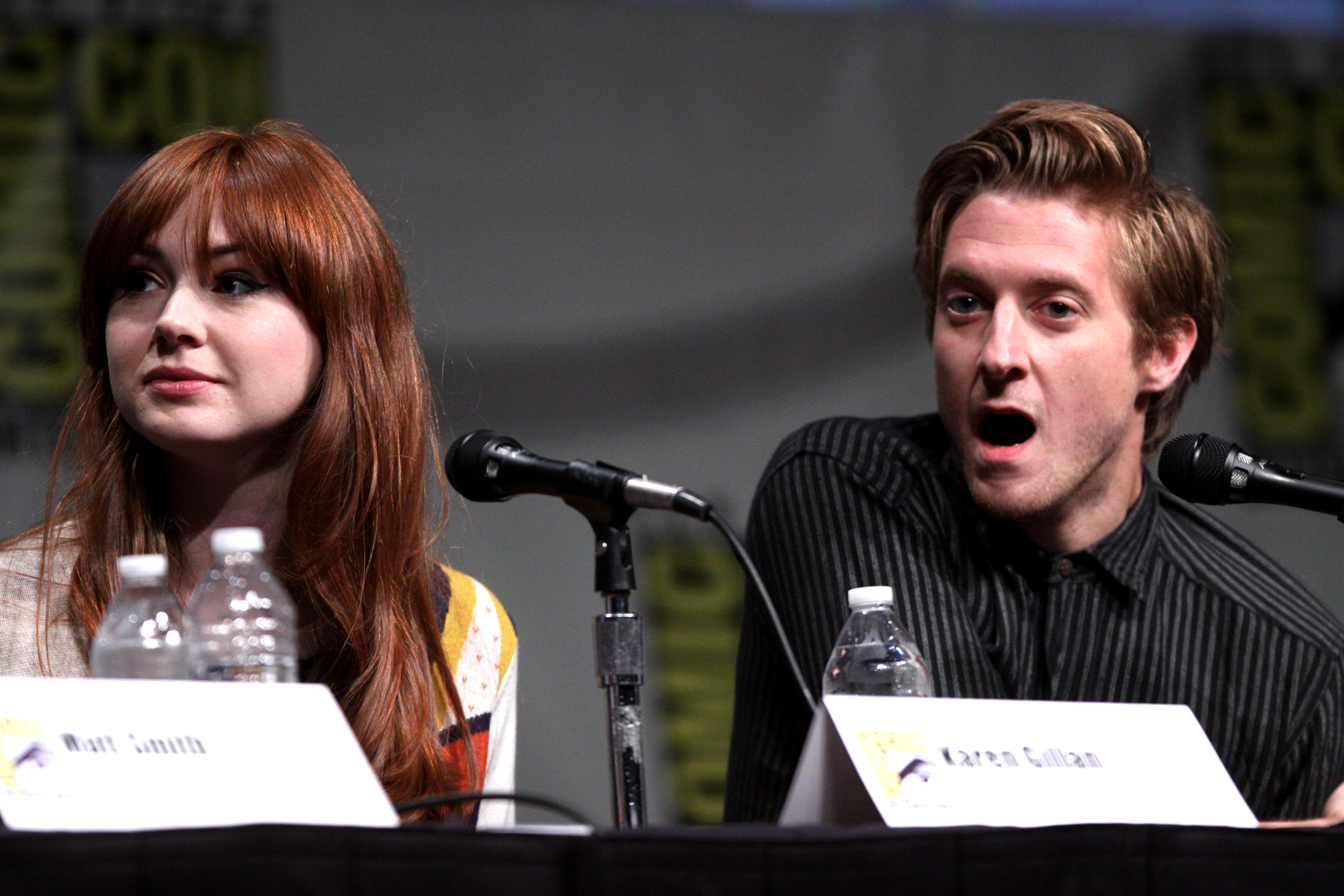
Karen Gillan and Arthur Darvill at Comic-Con 2012

In 2008, Darvill made his television acting debut in the ITV crime drama He Kills Coppers. The same year, he played Edward "Tip" Dorrit in the BBC serial Little Dorrit. Darvill began playing Rory Williams, companion to the Eleventh Doctor, in the fifth series of the BBC's science fiction show Doctor Who (reuniting with his Swimming with Sharks co-star Matt Smith). He became a regular character in the sixth series, and confirmed that he would be appearing in the seventh series; before he and his co-star Karen Gillan (on-screen wife Amy Pond) left in the fifth episode.

Darvill had a minor role as a stable groom in Ridley Scott's Robin Hood, and played Mick Gallagher in Sex & Drugs & Rock & Roll (both 2010). In the summer of 2011, he played Mephistopheles "an agent of the Devil in human form" in Doctor Faustus at Shakespeare's Globe Theatre in London, a production which was subsequently issued as a DVD. After his departure from Doctor Who he was cast in the drama Broadchurch as vicar Paul Coates, alongside David Tennant and Olivia Colman.

On 19 April 2013, he took over the lead male role of Guy from the musical Once, on Broadway, New York, opposite new co-star Joanna Christie. The two performers also made an appearance on the 2013 Tony Awards to perform a number and to present the award for best scenery. Darvill continued the role in the West End production from 17 March 2014 until 10 May 2014.

In March 2015, Darvill was cast as the time-traveller Rip Hunter in the series Legends of Tomorrow. He was written out of the show in 2018, by the end of the third season. However, he returned in 2021 for the show's one hundredth episode. In 2019, Darvill took on the role of Oscar Lindquist in the West End revival of Sweet Charity.

In 2022, Darvill played the lead male role of Curly McLain in the musical Oklahoma! at the Young Vic. In 2023, he continued the role in the West End production.

Darvill will portray the Beatles' press officer Derek Taylor in The Beatles – A Four-Film Cinematic Event, an upcoming film series of biopics directed by Sam Mendes.

=== Music and audio work ===
Darvill is also a musician and a composer; he has written songs and music for the Bush Theatre, and composed the score for Che Walker's 2008 play The Frontline at Shakespeare's Globe. In June 2009, the musical Been So Long, based on Ché Walker's 1998 play, opened at the Young Vic and in September 2013 another collaboration, The Lightning Child, opened at the Globe. Darvill had worked with Walker for a number of years since they had first met at RADA, developing the songs and music for the show. The musical was performed at the Latitude Festival in July and had a run at the Traverse Theatre in August. Darvill received a Judge's Discretionary Award from MTM for his music. In 2010, Darvill helped promote the solo album of Fyfe Dangerfield, playing with him on sessions for Graham Norton's show and on Xfm.

Darvill has undertaken a number of radio and voice projects, including Doctor Who audiobooks. In December 2011, he played Keith Moon for BBC Radio 4's Burning Both Ends. In 2012, he voiced Gulliver in Radio 4's Gulliver's Travels and Sam in the short film Penguin.

He collaborated with playwright Sam Holcroft on a musical adaptation of Roald Dahl's Fantastic Mr. Fox which premiered at the Nuffield Theatre, Southampton, in November 2016.

In 2018, Darvill started a new musical collective with Ines De Clercq. The collective performed at St Pancras Old Church on 22 November 2018. They took some time to record in a studio in December of that year.

In 2020, Darvill appeared on the concept album for Vikki Stone and Katie Mulgrew's musical #ZoologicalSociety. Despite the concert being cancelled due to the COVID-19 pandemic, the album featuring Darvill was released digitally on 27 March 2020.

On 13 June 2020, it was confirmed that Darvill would reprise his role as Rory Williams with Big Finish Productions, in a multi-box set series entitled The Lone Centurion, chronicling the character's time between the episodes "The Pandorica Opens" and "The Big Bang".

== Personal life ==
Darvill enjoys cooking and attending the theatre and concerts. He appreciates the art of taxidermy and has collected many pieces. He is close friends with his Doctor Who former co-stars Karen Gillan and Matt Smith. He is non-religious.

In 2015, Darvill married Inès De Clercq.

Along with other British celebrities, Darvill designed and signed his own card for the UK-based charity Thomas Coram Foundation for Children. The cards were auctioned off on eBay during May 2014.

== Acting credits ==
=== Film ===
Year	Title	Role	Notes
2008	Intangible	Billy	Short film
2010	Sex & Drugs & Rock & Roll	Mick Gallagher	
2010	Robin Hood	Groom	
2010	Pelican Blood	Cameron	
2013	Crazy for You	Charlie	Short film
2014	Penguin	Sam (voice)	Short film
2014	Captcha	Mel	Short film
2018	In Wonderland	Michael	Short film
2018	Bertie	Tom	Short film
2018	Shut Up and Dig	Ben	Short film
2021	People You May Know	Adam	Short film
2024	And Mrs	Dylan	
2028	The Beatles – A Four-Film Cinematic Event	Derek Taylor	Filming

=== Television ===
Year	Title	Role	Notes
2001	Sooty	Tom	
2008	He Kills Coppers	PC Wallis	TV film
2008	Little Dorrit	Edward "Tip" Dorrit	7 episodes
2010–2012	Doctor Who	Rory Williams	27 episodes: Recurring role (series 5); Main role (series 6–7)
2012	Pond Life	Rory Williams	5 mini-episodes
2012	The Paradise	Bradley Burroughs	Episode: "#1.5"
2013–2017	Broadchurch	Reverend Paul Coates	23 episodes
2013	The White Queen	Henry Stafford	2 episodes
2015	Danny and the Human Zoo	Jonesy	TV film
2016–2018, 2021	Legends of Tomorrow	Rip Hunter	35 episodes: Main role (season 1–2); Recurring role (season 3); Guest role (season 7)
2019	Sticky	Dr. Boot	Episode: "Where Eagles Fap"
2019	World on Fire	Vernon Hunter	3 episodes
2020	Unprecedented	Danny	Segment: "Romantic Distancing"
2022	Grace	Kit Bishop / Jecks	Episode: "Not Dead Enough"
2022	The Sandman	Richard Madoc	Episode: "Calliope"
2023	Three Little Birds	Ernest Wantage	5 episodes
2025	A Cruel Love: The Ruth Ellis Story	Victor Mishcon	
2025	The Sandman	Richard Madoc	Episode: "A Tale of Graceful Ends"

=== Theatre ===
Year	Title	Role	Notes
1996	Little Shop of Horrors	Seymour Krelborn	Midlands Arts Centre
2006	Terre Haute	Harrison	Wildman Room, Assembly Rooms; Trafalgar Studios
2007	Stacy	Rob	Arcola Theatre
2007	Swimming with Sharks	Rex	Vaudeville Theatre
2010	Marine Parade	Christopher	Old Market, Hove, East Sussex
2011	Doctor Faustus	Mephistopheles	Shakespeare's Globe
2012	Our Boys	Parry	Duchess Theatre
2013–2014	Once	Guy	Bernard B. Jacobs Theatre; Phoenix Theatre
2014–2015	Treasure Island	Long John Silver	Royal National Theatre; National Theatre Live
2017	Honeymoon in Vegas	Jack Singer	London Palladium
2018	Genesis Inc.	Miles / Abraham	Hampstead Theatre
2019	Sweet Charity	Oscar	Donmar Warehouse
2019	The Antipodes	Dave	Royal National Theatre
2021	Rare Earth Mettle	Henry Finn	Royal Court Theatre
2022–2023	Oklahoma!	Curly McLain	Young Vic; Wyndham's Theatre
2023	Once	Guy	Shanghai Culture Square; Shenzhen Grand Theatre; Beijing Tianqiao Performing Arts Center

=== Video games ===
Year	Title	Role	Notes
2011	Doctor Who: The Gunpowder Plot	Rory Williams	Also likeness
2021	The Magnificent Trufflepigs	Adam	

=== Audio ===
Year	Title	Role	Notes
2012	Dark Shadows: Speak No Evil	Tad Collins	Big Finish Productions
2012	Road Trip	Doctor Jared Jones	Big Finish Productions
2012	Skarlet	Jake Lawton	Audible
2013	Dark Shadows: Beneath the Veil	Alfie Chapman	Audible
2014	Frankenstein	Victor Frankenstein	Big Finish Productions
2018	Torchwood: Believe	Frank Layton	Big Finish Productions
2020	Time Lord Victorious: Echoes of Extinction	Cooke	Big Finish Productions
2020	The Sandman	William Shakespeare	Audible
2021–2022	The Lone Centurion	Rory Williams	Big Finish Productions
2021–2022	Eliza: A Robot Story	Him	Crowd Network
2023	Good Material	Andy	Penguin Audio

=== Radio ===
Year	Title	Role	Notes
2011	The Tales of Max Carrados	Max Carrados	BBC Radio 4
2011	Burning Both Ends: When Oliver Reed Met Keith Moon	Keith Moon	BBC Radio 4
2012	Jonathan Swift: Gulliver's Travels	Gulliver	BBC Radio 4
2017	Into the Water	Mark	BBC Radio 4
2018	Billy Ruffian	Maitland	BBC Radio 4
2018	Hi Spec	Ben	BBC Radio 4
2018	Seven Songs for Simon Dixelius	Simon Dixelius	BBC Radio 4
