= Terre Haute (play) =

- Original language: English
- Written by: Edmund White

Premiere
- Date: 2006
- Place: Edinburgh Festival Fringe; Edinburgh, Scotland

Terre Haute is a 2006 play by the American writer Edmund White.

== Plot ==
It deals with a fictional encounter between the 1995 Oklahoma City bomber Timothy McVeigh and a character similar to author Gore Vidal in the days prior to the former's 2001 execution inside a prison complex in Terre Haute, Indiana.

== Productions ==
The play made its stage première as part of the 2006 Edinburgh Festival Fringe, held in Edinburgh, Scotland, and transferred to Trafalgar Studios, a West End theatre located London, England, in May 2007. The U.S. premiere was in San Francisco in 2007. Its New York City, New York, début was in 2009, at the 59E59 Theaters, an off-Broadway theatre complex.
