= Michaela Coel =

British actress, writer and director (born 1987)

Michaela Coel FRSL
- Coel at the Toronto International Film Festival 2025.
- Born: Michaela Ewuraba Boakye-Collinson; 1 October 1987 (age 39); London, England
- Citizenship: United Kingdom; Ghana
- Education: Guildhall School of Music and Drama
- Occupations: Actress, television director, producer, screenwriter
- Years active: 2013–present

Michaela Ewuraba Boakye-Collinson FRSL (born 1 October 1987), known professionally as Michaela Coel, is a British and Ghanaian actress, writer and television director. She is known for creating and starring in the E4 television sitcom Chewing Gum (2015–2017), for which she won the BAFTA Award for Best Female Comedy Performance; and the BBC One / HBO comedy-drama series I May Destroy You (2020), for which she won the British Academy Television Award for Best Actress in 2021. For her work on I May Destroy You, Coel was the first Black woman to win the Primetime Emmy Award for Outstanding Writing for a Limited Series, Movie, or Dramatic Special.

Coel is also known for her work in other Netflix productions, including guest-starring in the series Black Mirror (2016–2017), and starring in the series Black Earth Rising (2018) and film Been So Long (2018) and the Amazon Prime drama series Mr. & Mrs. Smith for which she won the Primetime Emmy Award for Outstanding Guest Actress in a Drama Series.

== Early life and education ==
Michaela Ewuraba Boakye-Collinson was born on 1 October 1987 in East London, England. Her parents are Ghanaian. She and her sister were raised by their mother in East London, primarily Hackney and Tower Hamlets. She attended Catholic schools in East London, and has said that, during primary school, she bullied other pupils. She claimed that her behaviour was caused by her isolation as the only black pupil in her age cohort. This isolation did not continue into her secondary education at a comprehensive school.

From 2007 to 2009, Coel attended the University of Birmingham, studying English Literature and Theology. She took a Ché Walker masterclass after meeting Walker at open mic nights. In 2009, she transferred to the Guildhall School of Music and Drama, where she was the first black woman enrolled in five years. She won the Laurence Olivier Bursary Award, which helped her fund her schooling. During her time at Guildhall, Coel attended the Mark Proulx workshop at Prima del Teatro and took the Kat Francois Poetry Course at the Theatre Royal Stratford East. She graduated from the Guildhall School of Music and Drama in 2012.

== Career ==
=== Beginnings ===
In 2006, Coel began performing at poetry open mics in Ealing. As she continued to do open mics, she was encouraged to apply to Guildhall by director and actor Ché Walker, who saw her perform at the Hackney Empire. As a poet, Coel performed on many stages, including Wembley Arena, Bush Theatre, Nuyorican Poets Cafe and De Doelen, Rotterdam. She went by the name Michaela The Poet. Coel joined the Talawa Theatre Company summer school program TYPT in 2009. During her time at Talawa, Coel was in the TYPT 2009 production of Krunch, directed by Amani Naphtali. That same year, Coel released an album entitled Fixing Barbie, which featured her work as a poet and musician. In 2011, Coel released the record We're the Losers. Coel's play Chewing Gum Dreams was her senior graduation project at Guildhall in 2012. The play was first produced at The Yard Theatre in Hackney Wick. The play featured Coel in a one-woman show telling the dramatic story of a 14-year-old girl named Tracey. The play was next produced by the Bush Theatre (2012), Royal Theatre Holland (2012), Royal Exchange Theatre (2013) and the National Theatre (2014). It received positive reviews.

=== Early work and breakthrough (2013–2019) ===
In 2013, Coel appeared in the Channel 4 drama Top Boy. She has had leading roles at the National Theatre, including the award-nominated Home and the critically acclaimed Medea. Channel 4 announced in August 2014 that Coel would write and star in a new sitcom called Chewing Gum, inspired by her play Chewing Gum Dreams. "C4 Comedy Blaps" were released as teasers in September 2014, and the series began on E4 in October 2015. Her performance earned her the British Academy Television Award for Best Female Comedy Performance in 2016. She also won a BAFTA for Breakthrough Talent for writing the show. Chewing Gum received overwhelmingly positive reviews.

In 2015, Coel appeared in BBC One drama London Spy. The following year, she played Lilyhot in the E4 sci-fi comedy-drama The Aliens, which was filmed in Bulgaria. Chewing Gum returned for a second series in January 2017. She also appeared in both the "Nosedive" and "USS Callister" episodes of Charlie Brooker's series Black Mirror. Coel also had a small role in the 2017 film Star Wars: The Last Jedi. In 2018, Coel starred in Black Earth Rising, a co-production between BBC Two and Netflix, where she played Kate, the main character. She also starred as Simone in the musical-drama film Been So Long, by Che Walker, based on his own stage play, which was released on Netflix to positive reviews in October 2018.

=== Critical acclaim (2020–present) ===
Coel created, wrote, produced, co-directed and starred in the comedy-drama series I May Destroy You, inspired by her own experience of sexual assault. The show launched on BBC One in the UK and HBO in the US in June 2020 to widespread acclaim. She acknowledged refusing $1 million from Netflix after the streaming service declined to offer her intellectual property ownership of her show. In 2020, Coel was included in Time's 100 Most Influential People. She was also named as one of the breakout stars of 2020 for film. Coel also appeared in British Vogue's 2020 list of influential women. Furthermore, in the 15th annual Powerlist of the most influential people of African or African-Caribbean heritage in the United Kingdom, Coel was ranked fourth for the impact of her work I May Destroy You.

In July 2021, Coel was cast in Black Panther: Wakanda Forever which was released on 11 November 2022. She plays the role of Aneka, a member of the Dora Milaje. Coel's first book, Misfits: a Personal Manifesto, was published simultaneously in the UK and the USA on 7 September 2021 by Ebury Press. Based on her MacTaggart lecture at 2018's Edinburgh Festival, which touches on Coel's experiences with racism and misogyny, her publisher described the book as "a powerful manifesto on how speaking your truth and owning your differences can transform your life". Coel was elected a Fellow of the Royal Society of Literature in 2022. In 2025, she starred in Steven Soderbergh’s The Christopher’s. In 2026, she starred in David Lowery's Mother Mary.

On 19 August 2024 Coel announced her first TV show in four years. She will write, star in and executive produce First Day On Earth, a 10-part series for the BBC, which is in production as of 2026. In March 2026, it was announced that Coel will write and direct a reimagining of the 1988 film Bloodsport with A24 producing.

== Personal life ==
At the 2016 British Academy Television Awards, Coel wore a gown designed by her mother, made of Kente cloth. She has said that, like her Chewing Gum character Tracey, she became very religious as a Pentecostal Christian and embraced celibacy. Coel stopped practising Pentecostalism after attending Guildhall.

In August 2018, Coel disclosed that she was drugged and sexually assaulted by two unnamed men during the writing of her sitcom Chewing Gum. The attack would later inspire her to create the TV drama I May Destroy You.

Coel said in a 2018 interview that she identified as aromantic. As of 2025, she is in a relationship with tech entrepreneur Spencer Hewett after meeting on the celebrity dating app Raya.

Her cousin is the rapper and author Guvna B.

== Acting credits ==
=== Film ===
Year	Title	Role	Notes
2014	National Theatre Live: Medea	Nurse	
2014	Monsters: Dark Continent	Kelly	
2017	Star Wars: The Last Jedi	Resistance Monitor	
2018	Been So Long	Simone	
2022	Black Panther: Wakanda Forever	Aneka	
2025	The Christophers	Lori Butler	
2026	Mother Mary	Sam Anselm	

=== Television ===
Year	Title	Role	Notes
2013	Top Boy	Kayla	2 episodes
2013	Law & Order: UK	Maid	Episode: "Paternal"
2015	London Spy	Journalist	Episode: "Strangers"
2015–2017	Chewing Gum	Tracey Gordon	Main role; also creator, writer, producer and composer
2016	The Aliens	Lilyhot	Main role
2016	Black Mirror	Airline Stewardess	Episode: "Nosedive"
2017	Black Mirror	Shania Lowry	Episode: "USS Callister"
2018	Black Earth Rising	Kate Ashby	Main role
2019	RuPaul's Drag Race UK	Guest judge	Series 1; Episode: "Family That Drags Together"
2020	I May Destroy You	Arabella Essiedu	Main role; also creator, writer, director and executive producer
2024	Mr. & Mrs. Smith	Bev	Episode: "Infidelity"
TBA	First Day on Earth †	Henri	Main role; also creator, writer, director and an executive producer

=== Theatre ===
Year	Title	Role	Venue
2013	Three Birds	Tiana	Bush Theatre, London
2013	Home	Young Mum / Portugal	Royal National Theatre, London
2013	Chewing Gum Dreams	Tracey Gordon	Royal Exchange, Manchester
2014	Blurred Lines	Michaela	Royal National Theatre, London
2014	Home (Revival)	Young Mum / Portugal	Royal National Theatre, London
2014	Chewing Gum Dreams	Tracey Gordon	Royal National Theatre, London
2014	Medea	Nurse	Royal National Theatre, London

== Discography ==
EP

- 22 May (2007)

LPs

- Fixing Barbie (2009)
- We're the Losers (2011)

== Bibliography ==
- Coel, Michaela (2013). Chewing Gum Dreams (UK ed.). London: Oberon Books Ltd. ISBN 978-1-783-19014-0. OCLC 870600609.
- Coel, Michaela (2021). Misfits: A Personal Manifesto (UK ed.). London: Ebury Press. ISBN 978-1529148251. OCLC 1246284580.

== Awards and nominations ==
Year	Association	Category	Nominee	Result	Ref.
2008	Theatre Royal Stratford East Poetry Slam		Herself	Won	
2009	Theatre Royal Stratford East Poetry Slam		Herself	Won	
2010	Theatre Royal Stratford East Poetry Slam		Herself	Won	
2010	Cordless Show	Poetry/Music	Herself	Won	
2011	Laurence Olivier Award	Bursary Award	Herself	Won	
2012	Alfred Fagon Award	Best Playwright of African or Caribbean Descent	Chewing Gum Dreams	Won	
2016	British Academy Television Award	Best Female Comedy Performance	Chewing Gum	Won	
2016	British Academy Television Award	Best Scripted Comedy	Chewing Gum	Nominated	
2016	British Academy Television Award	Breakthrough Talent	Chewing Gum	Won	
2016	RTA Programme Award	Breakthrough	Chewing Gum	Won	
2016	RTA Programme Award	Comedy Performance	Chewing Gum	Won	
2016	RTA Programme Award	Writer - Comedy	Chewing Gum	Nominated	
2016	South Bank Sky Arts Award	Times Breakthrough Award	Herself	Nominated	
2017	Black Reel Television Award	Outstanding Comedy Series	Chewing Gum	Nominated	
2017	Black Reel Television Award	Outstanding Actress, Comedy Series	Chewing Gum	Nominated	
2017	Black Reel Television Award	Outstanding Writing, Comedy Series	Chewing Gum	Nominated	
2018	Berlin International Film Festival Award	EFP Shooting Star	Herself	Won	
2018	British Academy Television Award	Best Scripted Comedy	Chewing Gum	Nominated	
2018	Black Reel Television Award	Outstanding Supporting Actress, TV Movie/Limited Series	Black Mirror	Nominated	
2018	British Independent Film Award	Most Promising Newcomer	Been So Long	Nominated	
2019	Black Reel Television Award	Outstanding Actress, TV Movie/Limited Series	Black Earth Rising	Nominated	
2021	British Academy Television Awards	Best Mini-Series	I May Destroy You	Won	
2021	British Academy Television Awards	Best Actress	I May Destroy You	Won	
2021	British Academy Television Awards	Best Director: Fiction	I May Destroy You	Won	
2021	British Academy Television Awards	Best Writer: Drama	I May Destroy You	Won	
2021	Critics' Choice Television Awards	Best Limited Series	I May Destroy You	Nominated	
2021	Critics' Choice Television Awards	Best Actress in a Limited Series	I May Destroy You	Nominated	
2021	Dorian Awards	Best TV Movie or Miniseries	I May Destroy You	Won	
2021	Dorian Awards	Best LGBTQ TV Show	I May Destroy You	Nominated	
2021	Dorian Awards	Best TV Performance	I May Destroy You	Won	
2021	Dorian Awards	Wilde Wit Award	I May Destroy You	Won	
2021	Independent Spirit Awards	Best New Scripted Series	I May Destroy You	Won	
2021	Independent Spirit Awards	Best Ensemble Cast	I May Destroy You	Won	
2021	MTV Movie & TV Awards	Best Performance in a Show	I May Destroy You	Nominated	
2021	NAACP Image Awards	Outstanding Actress in a Television Movie, Mini-Series or Dramatic Special	I May Destroy You	Nominated	
2021	NAACP Image Awards	Outstanding Directing in a Comedy Series	I May Destroy You	Won	
2021	Primetime Emmy Awards	Outstanding Limited or Anthology Series	I May Destroy You	Nominated	
2021	Primetime Emmy Awards	Outstanding Lead Actress in a Limited Series or Movie	I May Destroy You	Nominated	
2021	Primetime Emmy Awards	Outstanding Writing for a Limited Series, Movie, or Dramatic Special	I May Destroy You	Won	
2021	Primetime Emmy Awards	Outstanding Directing for a Limited Series, Movie, or Dramatic Special	I May Destroy You	Nominated	
2021	Producers Guild of America Awards	Outstanding Producer of Limited Series Television	I May Destroy You	Nominated	
2021	Screen Actors Guild Awards	Outstanding Performance by a Female Actor in a Miniseries or Television Movie	I May Destroy You	Nominated	
2021	Television Critics Association Awards	Individual Achievement in Drama	I May Destroy You	Won	
2021	Broadcasting Press Guild Awards	Best Drama Series	I May Destroy You	Won	
2021	Broadcasting Press Guild Awards	Best Actress	I May Destroy You	Won	
2021	Broadcasting Press Guild Awards	Best Writer	I May Destroy You	Won	
2023	The Fashion Awards	Pandora Leader of Change Award	Herself	Won	
2024	Primetime Emmy Awards	Outstanding Guest Actress in a Drama Series	Mr. & Mrs. Smith (for "Infidelity")	Won	

== See also ==
- List of British actors
- List of Primetime Emmy Award winners
