= The Show (2020 film) =

2020 film

- Directed by: Mitch Jenkins
- Written by: Alan Moore
- Produced by: Tom Brown; Mike Elliott; Jim Mooney
- Starring: Tom Burke; Siobhan Hewlett; Alan Moore; Ellie Bamber; Darrell D'Silva; Christopher Fairbank; Sheila Atim; John Bradley; Richard Dillane
- Cinematography: Simon Tindall
- Edited by: Colin Goudie
- Music by: Andrew Broder; Mara Carlyle; Alan Moore
- Production companies: Lex Films; EMU Films; British Film Institute; LipSync Films
- Distributed by: Altitude Film Distribution
- Release dates: 12 October 2020 (Sitges); 27 August 2021 (United Kingdom)
- Running time: 116 minutes
- Country: United Kingdom
- Language: English
- Budget: ~£900,000

The Show is a 2020 British fantasy neo-noir film, written by Alan Moore and directed by Mitch Jenkins. The film follows a detective arriving in Northampton searching for a missing artefact. It stars Tom Burke, Siobhan Hewlett, Ellie Bamber and Alan Moore.

== Plot ==
Fletcher Dennis (Tom Burke) arrives in Northampton in search of a missing person, James Mitchum. He visits the local public library where he meets librarian Henry Gaunt (Richard Dillane) who offers to assist him in the search and appears to hack into the network of the local hospital to reveal that James was admitted to there the previous evening. Fletcher heads to the hospital where he is ushered down to the morgue by Clive (Julian Bleach) to discover James dead from his injuries.

Following a series of leads, Fletcher meets with a pair of adolescent detectives in a garden shed. On his way out he encounters a local gangster waiting to also see the juveniles. Moving on, he next encounters the bouncer at the nightclub where James Mitchum was fatally injured. Next, he finds Faith (Siobhan Hewlett) who is in Hospital. She relates her near-death experience to Fletcher, in which she met James and danced with him in a club. Fletcher reveals to Faith that he isn’t looking for a friend but is in fact a private investigator looking for a missing necklace and that his client is an elderly East End businessman, Patsy Bleeker.

Fletcher’s dreams each night become increasingly strange until he dreams he finds himself in the same club that Faith visited in her near-death experience. In that dream he meets Frank Metterton who relates that Patsy is not telling him the truth about himself or the necklace. The next day Fletcher explains to Faith what he has discovered about Patsy in the dream. They decide they must lure Patsy to Northampton to resolve the matter.

Patsy arrives in Northampton that evening, and with the help of his minions, kidnaps Faith in order to lure Fletcher into an ambush. Fletcher thwarts Patsy and his men and rescues Faith. The events are watched on closed-circuit television by Henry Gaunt, dressed as a masked superhero.

== Cast ==
- Tom Burke as Fletcher Dennis
- Siobhan Hewlett as Faith Harrington
- Ellie Bamber as Becky Cornelius
- Alan Moore as Frank Metterton
- Sheila Atim as John Conqueror
- Antonia Campbell-Hughes as Monica Beardsley
- Richard Dillane as Henry Gaunt
- Christopher Fairbank as Patsy Bleeker
- Darrell D'Silva as James Mitchum
- Bradley John as Elton Carnaby
- Julian Bleach as Clive

== Production ==
In December 2018, it was announced in Deadline that production of the film was underway in Northampton, with Mitch Jenkins directing from a screenplay by Alan Moore. Jim Mooney, Mike Elliot and Tom Brown served as producers on the film with finance from the British Film Institute and LipSync and with Protagonist Pictures serving as the worldwide sales agent.

Moore was quoted in the article, saying: “With The Show, I wanted to apply the storytelling ability accumulated during the rest of my varied career to the medium of film.”

== Release ==
The Show was an official selection for SXSW 2020. Following SXSW's cancellation due to the COVID-19 pandemic the film had a world premiere at Sitges Film Festival on 12 October 2020. It had its premiere in the United Kingdom on 27 August 2021 at London FrightFest Film Festival and was released in the United States on 26 August 2021 by Shout! Factory and Fathom Events.

== Reception ==
On the review aggregator website Rotten Tomatoes, 79% of 19 critics' reviews are positive, with an average rating of 6.7/10. Metacritic, which uses a weighted average, assigned the film a score of 69 out of 100, based on 5 critics, indicating "generally favorable" reviews.

The Show was reviewed at its Sitges premiere by Spanish website Espinof, highlighting the British humour in The Show giving the film four out of five stars. Reviewing the premiere online, due to COVID-19 pandemic travel restrictions, Kirsty Puchko writing for IGN, described it as “an unrepentantly trippy Noir that assaults the senses, cackling all the while” and continued “Alan Moore gives his fans doses of what they crave from him. There's a mind-bending detective story in a twisted realm of violence, vigilantes, corruption, and chaos.” IGN gave the film a score of nine out of ten.

On its UK release, The Guardian gave the film four out of five stars, writing "The plot is a Chandlerian shoal of red herrings but, like Moore’s League of Extraordinary Gentlemen comics, no detail is accidental: from the pun-strewn flyposters to Fletcher’s Dennis the Menace red-and-black sweatshirt." Marc Burrows, reviewing for HeyUguys.com scored the film four out of five stars, noting the comic script: “Alan Moore’s sense of humour has always been an underrated aspect of his writing, and The Show is filled with cracking, beautifully observed dialogue and ridiculous imagery.” Writing in Sight & Sound, Kim Newman described Mitch Jenkins’ direction as “colourful, lucid-dream, Lynch-by-way-of-Film4”. Reviewing for Bleeding Cool, Rich Johnston gave the film a score of ten out of ten, noting the detail in the script "there are some aspects that only make sense if you read newspaper headlines on hoardings, adverts in the newsagent window, or pieces of graffiti around Northampton". Writing in BBC Culture, Nicholas Barber said The Show was a "must-see release" for October 2021, describing it as "a detective yarn about a mystery man scouring the streets of Northampton for a jewel thief, but it's also a surreal, magical, nocturnal odyssey".
