= Irina Palm =

2007 film by Sam Garbarski

- Theatrical release poster
- Directed by: Sam Garbarski
- Screenplay by: Martin Herron; Philippe Blasband
- Produced by: Sébastien Delloye
- Starring: Marianne Faithfull; Miki Manojlović; Kevin Bishop; Siobhan Hewlett; Dorka Gryllus; Jenny Agutter
- Cinematography: Christophe Beaucarne
- Edited by: Ludo Troch
- Music by: Ghinzu
- Production companies: Entre Chien et Loup; Pallas Film; Samsa Film; Ipso Facto Films; Liaison Cinématographique; Ateliers de Baere; RTBF Television
- Distributed by: Paradiso Entertainment (Belgium); Pyramide Distribution (France); X Verleih AG (through Warner Bros.) (Germany)
- Release dates: 13 February 2007 (Berlinale); 18 April 2007 (Belgium); 9 May 2007 (France)
- Running time: 103 minutes
- Countries: Belgium; Germany; Luxembourg; United Kingdom; France
- Language: English
- Budget: €4.3 million (or $4.5 million)
- Box office: $10.6 million

Irina Palm is a 2007 tragicomedy film directed by Sam Garbarski from a screenplay by Martin Herron and Philippe Blasband. It is an international co-production between Belgium, Germany, Luxembourg, the United Kingdom, and France. It stars Marianne Faithfull as a senior-aged woman whose desire to pay for her sick grandson's operation takes her down a path she never would have imagined. Miki Manojlović, Kevin Bishop, Siobhan Hewlett, Dorka Gryllus, and Jenny Agutter appear in supporting roles.

The film had its world premiere at the 57th Berlin International Film Festival on 13 February 2007, and was theatrically released in Belgium on 18 April 2007, by Paradiso Entertainment. It grossed over $10.6 million worldwide against a $4.5 million budget. It received mixed reviews from critics, who mostly praised Faithfull's performance, but criticized Garbarski's direction and the screenplay. At the 20th European Film Awards, Faithfull and Manojlović were nominated for Best Actress and Best Actor, respectively.

== Plot ==
The 60-year-old widow Maggie desperately needs money for the cost of traveling to Australia for a special medical treatment of her beloved ill grandson Olly. After several unsuccessful attempts to get a job, she finds herself in the streets of Soho. Her eye is caught by poster in the window of a shop called Sexy World: "Hostess wanted." She enters, and Miki, the owner of the shop, explains to her frankly that "hostess" is a euphemism for "whore." The job he has for her is one for which age and being visually attractive are not important: a male customer inserts his penis in a hole in a wall (glory hole), and she, at the other side, gives a handjob. Her colleague, Luisa, shows her how to do it, and after the first hesitation, she quickly develops good skills. However, she keeps her work secret from friends and family, which leads to uncomfortable situations. After a while, she tells some friends. They are quite interested and ask various details.

Under the pseudonym Irina Palm, she becomes increasingly more successful and well-paid, 600 to 800 pounds a week. However, the health of her grandson deteriorates quickly, therefore she asks and receives an advance payment of 6000 pounds for 10 weeks of work. She gives the money to her son Tom without telling how she got it. He follows her to learn about the source of the money, and is furious when he discovers what she does. He wants her to never go there again and says he will himself return the money and not go to Australia. However, his wife, Sarah, is thankful to Maggie for her sacrifice to save the boy. Tom and Maggie reconcile and Tom, Sarah, and Olly go to Australia.

Luisa is fired due to Maggie's success. She is very angry at Maggie. A competitor of Miki's offers Maggie a better job, as supervisor of prostitutes in a room with multiple glory holes. She would get 15% of their earnings. She hesitates but eventually declines the offer; becoming a madam is a step too far for her. Maggie and Miki eventually fall in love with each other.

== Cast ==
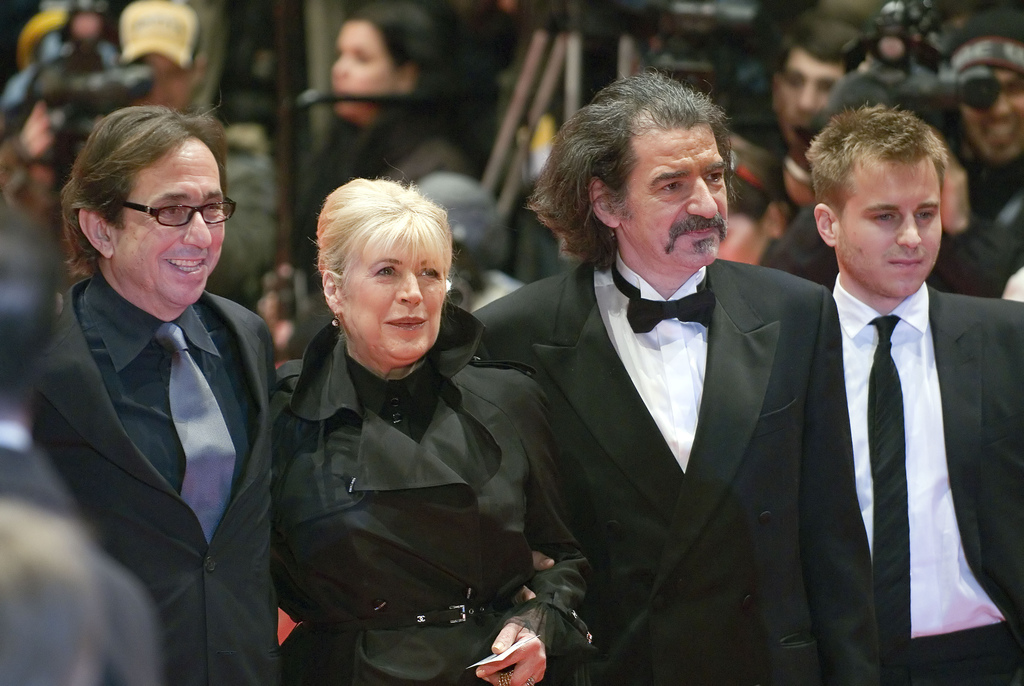
Sam Garbarski, Marianne Faithfull, Miki Manojlović and Kevin Bishop at the premiere of Irina Palm

- Marianne Faithfull as Maggie, the film's protagonist, who starts working in a sex shop to pay for her grandson's medical treatment
- Miki Manojlović as Miklos, owner of the sex shop
- Kevin Bishop as Tom, Maggie's son
- Siobhan Hewlett as Sarah, Tom's wife and Maggie's daughter-in-law
- Corey Burke as Olly, Tom and Sarah's son and Maggie's grandson
- Dorka Gryllus as Luisa, one of Maggie's colleagues in the sex shop
- Jenny Agutter as Jane, one of Maggie's friends
- Meg Wynn Owen as Julia, one of Maggie's friends
- Susan Hitch as Beth, one of Maggie's friends
- Flip Webster as Edith, the local shopkeeper

== Production ==
Irina Palm was produced by Sébastien Delloye for Entre Chien et Loup (Belgium), in co-production with Pallas Film (Germany), Samsa Film (Luxembourg), Ipso Facto Films (United Kingdom), Liaison Cinématographique (France), Ateliers de Baere (Belgium), and RTBF Television (Belgium).

Director Sam Garbarski said about his choice to shoot the film in English:

It would have been very easy to make a satirical comedy or to fall into the trap of vulgarity. What I like in tragicomedy is the poetry of humour. And the English language, regardless of its socio-cultural links, portrays a fabulous humoristic outlook on life. This quality for self-derision is very dear and very important to me. It gave the film that little bit extra. We wouldn't have had that dimension, this subtle humour, if we had made the film in French.

Irina Palm was three years in the making, and principal photography lasted eight weeks. The film was shot in Soho and around London, England for the exterior scenes, with studio work and interior scenes filmed in Leipzig, Germany and in Luxembourg.

== Release ==
Irina Palm premiered in the main competition section of the 57th Berlin International Film Festival on 13 February 2007. International sales were handled by Pyramide International. The film was released in Belgium by Paradiso Entertainment on 18 April, in France by Pyramide Distribution on 9 May, and in Germany by X Verleih AG on 14 June 2007.

== Reception ==
=== Critical response ===
On the review aggregator website Rotten Tomatoes, 65% of 49 critics' reviews are positive, with an average rating of 6.0/10. The website's consensus reads: "A strong performance from Faithfull anchors this perverse and lethargic — but ultimately thought-provoking — Garbarski drama." Metacritic, which uses a weighted average, assigned the film a score of 55 out of 100, based on 17 critics, indicating "mixed or average" reviews.

Peter Bradshaw of The Guardian gave the film 1 out of 5 stars and called it "a gobsmackingly awful British film - awful in the way that somehow only British films can be: our TV drama, of whatever quality, is never as creaky, naive, badly written and flatulent as this."

A. O. Scott of The New York Times stated, "Irina Palm does rise slightly above the silly clichés embedded in its story. This is mostly because of Marianne Faithfull." Scott also commented, "The rather shopworn plot of Irina Palm is buoyed by Mr. Garbarski's sense of realism — he manages to make the movie look and feel as if it were a slice-of-life drama rather than a preposterous fable — and above all by Ms. Faithfull."

Kenneth Turan of the Los Angeles Times described Irina Palm as "a sentimental film with a raunchy premise" and opined, "Genially preposterous and pleasantly diverting, it balances calculation against humanity and generally comes out on top."

Jonathan Romney of Screen Daily noted, "The film's overall tone is solmenly downbeat, with morose music underscoring the pathos, and Christophe Beaucarne's lensing concentrating on dark hues more suited to a moodier art-house drama."

Leslie Felperin of Variety remarked, "Pic is built around a would-be humorous script, but jiggery lensing and gloomy lighting suggest helmer Sam Garbarski is under some delusion that he's making a slice of gritty realism with romantic undertones."

Ray Bennett of The Hollywood Reporter called the film a "crowd-pleasing comedy-drama" and lauded the performances of Manojlović and Faithfull, writing that "Manojlovic deserves high praise for his handling of the club owner's reluctant corruption, but it is Faithfull's compassionate and knowing performance that will leave audiences smiling."

Anthony Quinn of The Independent opined, "Garbarski is hobbled by a woeful script, some very uncertain acting and a chorus of behatted biddies who never, ever seem to leave the village post-office. It's a collector's item, all the same."

=== Accolades ===
At the 57th Berlin International Film Festival, Irina Palm was awarded the Berliner Morgenpost Readers' Prize. At the 20th European Film Awards, the film garnered two nominations: Best Actress (for Faithfull) and Best Actor (for Manojlović). It won Best European Film at the 53rd David di Donatello Awards, but also received 2008's inaugural Irina Palm d'Or for Worst British Film.
