= The Frontline (play) =

The Frontline is a 2008 play by the British dramatist Ché Walker, with music by Arthur Darvill. It was written whilst he was appearing at Shakespeare's Globe in a production of Othello. Walker lives in Camden in London and the play deals with street life outside Camden Town tube station.

Its premiere production was at the Globe from 9 July to 17 August 2008. As the first contemporary play to be staged at the Globe, the play received praise from critics for its writing and its acting. - one reviewer called it a "unique, some might say shocking, experience urban drama ...[and] a brave new presentation of 21st century London".
