= Ché Walker =

English actor, playwright and director

Ché Walker is an English actor, playwright, theatre director, and teacher.

Among his notable works, his 1998 play "Been So Long" has been successfully adapted in other genres. As a musical for which Walker wrote the book, Been So Long played at the Edinburgh Festival Fringe and the Young Vic Theatre in 2009. It was later developed as a feature film of the same name starring Michaela Coel and released by Netflix in 2018.

As an actor, Walker has appeared on television, with credits including The Office and EastEnders. His mother is the actress Ann Mitchell. Walker lives in Camden in London.

== Accolades ==
- 2003: George Devine Award
- 2003: Arts Council Young Writers Award, for Flesh Wound

== List of works ==
=== Writing credits ===
- Been So Long, Royal Court Theatre, London, 1998; Young Vic Theatre, London, 2009; film, Netflix, 2018
- Jack and the Beanstalk, Lyric Theatre Hammersmith, London, 2009
- translation of Sophocles' Iphigenia, Southwark Playhouse
- Flesh Wound, Royal Court Theatre Upstairs, London,
- Crazy Love, Òran Mór, Glasgow, Scotland, 2007
- Dance for Me, Webber Douglas, 2004
- A Passion for Mayhem
- Greenskin Gal
- Inner City Magic
- Translation of Akos Nemeth's Car Thieves, Cottesloe Theatre, National Theatre, London, 2004
- The Frontline, Shakespeare's Globe, London, 2008
- The Lightning Child, Shakespeare's Globe, London, 2013
- Been So Long, film screenplay, 2018

=== Directing credits ===
- Etta Jenks (Finborough Theatre)
- Achidi J's Final Hours (Finborough Theatre)
- Rootz Spectacula (Belgrade Theatre, Coventry)
- Macbeth (Southwark Playhouse)
- The Glory of Living (Battersea Arts Centre)
- Balm in Gilead (RADA)
- A Mouthful of Birds (RADA)
- A Prayer for Owen Meany (Corbett Theatre)
- A Flea in Her Ear (Corbett Theatre)
- The Hot L Baltimore (Corbett Theatre)
- The Time Of Our Lies (Park Theatre)

=== Acting credits ===
- Othello (Shakespeare's Globe)
- The Pitchfork Disney (Citizens Theatre)
- Old Rose (Citizens Theatre)
- Sunshine (Southwark Playhouse)
- Biloxi Blues (Salisbury Playhouse)
- Wait Until Dark (Plymouth Theatre Royal)
- Danny and the Deep Blue Sea (Interchange Studios)
