= Broadchurch series 1 =

Season of television series

Broadchurch
- Series 1
- Cover art of Region 2 DVD release
- No. of episodes: 8

Release
- Original network: ITV
- Original release: 4 March – 22 April 2013

Series chronology
- Next → Series 2

The first series of the British crime drama Broadchurch originally aired on the ITV broadcast network in the United Kingdom from 4 March 2013 to 22 April 2013. The eight-episode series began with the murder of an 11-year-old boy in the fictional, close-knit coastal town of Broadchurch in Dorset, United Kingdom. The series depicted the impact that suspicion and media attention have on the community.

Though Broadchurch was first conceived of in 2003, creator and writer Chris Chibnall first began fleshing out the story and writing scripts for the first episodes in 2011. He approached ITV in autumn 2011 with the series, and the network quickly approved it for production. The role of Reverend Paul Coates was written for Arthur Darvill, and leads David Tennant and Olivia Colman were the first cast. Other roles were cast using auditions. Principal photography began on 13 August 2012 in Dorset. Most scenes were shot on location, with the majority of filming in and around Clevedon, Somerset and West Bay, Dorset. Soundstages were used for some interior scenes. Dialogue rarely departed from the scripts, but other aspects of the performances were improvised. A documentary visual style and an emphasis on first takes were used to heighten the realism of the series and acting. Few of the crew and none of the actors knew the identity of the murderer when filming began. A number of steps were taken to maintain this secret. Only those cast and crew with an absolute need to know were told the identity of the murderer once filming began on the final three episodes.

Broadchurch series one received widespread critical acclaim and high viewership ratings. Music by Ólafur Arnalds helped to inspire the series' mood and tone. Arnalds composed the series' soundtrack, which won a BAFTA Craft award. Among the many honours received by cast and crew, Olivia Colman won a BAFTA for Best Actress and David Bradley for Best Supporting Actor, and the series won Best Drama.

== Episodes ==
No. overall	Episode	Directed by	Written by	Original release date	UK viewers (millions)
1	Episode 1	James Strong	Chris Chibnall	4 March 2013	9.07
DS Ellie Miller is upset when Superintendent Jenkinson hires Alec Hardy to the DI position Miller wanted. Eleven-year-old Danny Latimer is found dead at the base of cliffs overlooking the local beach. The Scenes of Crime Officer tells Hardy that the crime scene was altered to look like an accident, and the pathologist reports that Danny was strangled. Ellie tells her son, Tom, about Danny's death, and Tom removes messages and files from his mobile phone and computer to remove evidence. Karen White, reporter for national newspaper The Daily Herald, arrives in town, seeking an exclusive on the death. Local reporter (and Ellie's nephew) Olly unwittingly provides Karen with a link to Chloe Latimer, and CCTV footage shows Danny skateboarding down the High Street on the night of his murder. Ellie notes that Danny's smartphone and skateboard were not recovered at the crime scene and are missing. At a press conference at the local school, Hardy asks the public for its help in solving the crime and pledges to find Danny's killer.
2	Episode 2	James Strong	Chris Chibnall	11 March 2013	9.01
Police discover cocaine in the bedroom of Danny's sister, Chloe, and £500 under Danny's bed: Chloe tries to blame hotel owner Becca Fisher. Newsagent Jack Marshall tells Hardy that he saw Danny arguing with a postman a few weeks back, which the postman, who has an alibi for the night of Danny's death, denies. Danny's mother, Beth confides to the priest, Paul Coates, that she is pregnant but hasn't told anyone. The audience learns that Susan Wright has Danny's skateboard stashed in her caravan. Telephone worker Steve Connelly claims psychic knowledge that a boat was involved in the death, and unsettles Hardy with information about a pendant. Danny's social media messages show conflict in the family. Video footage shows that Mark, Danny's father, was at the clifftop on the night of Danny's death, contrary to what he had previously told the police, and provides an unconvincing explanation, making Hardy suspicious, especially when his fingerprints are found in Danny's blood in a nearby hut.
3	Episode 3	Euros Lyn	Chris Chibnall	18 March 2013	9.65
Mark is again questioned by police and claims he had fixed a burst pipe in the hut some weeks earlier, which caretaker Susan later denies. He tells them that he was with his work colleague Nigel Carter on the night of Danny's death: Nigel attempts to support Mark's alibi, but his mother undermines this. Ellie finds blood on Mark's fishing boat, which he explains as having happened when Danny had an accident on the boat. The interview becomes bad tempered, and Mark is arrested for obstructing the investigation. Questioned by Hardy, Tom says that Danny had told him that he had been hit by his father during fits of bad temper. Hardy's doctor advises him to leave the job for the sake of his health, and Karen reveals she is interested in the case because of Hardy's failure in the Sandbrook case: there is anger between them over that case. Becca, having been contacted by Chloe, tells the police that Mark was having sex with her the night Danny died. Coates proposes a memorial service and Steve tells Beth that he has a spirit-message from Danny, claiming he was killed in a boat by someone close to the family. Hardy wants to stage a reconstruction, but Ellie is unhappy about his suggestion that Tom take part in it. Mark is released, but won't tell Beth where he was the night of Danny's death, and when she asks him if he killed Danny he storms off and meets Becca; Beth follows, and sees them hugging and kissing.
4	Episode 4	Euros Lyn	Chris Chibnall	25 March 2013	9.42
Ellie lets slip to Beth that Becca was Mark's alibi for where he was on the night of the murder. A boat is found burning at sea, and hair is found on it that is later found to be Danny's. Olly discovers Jack was jailed years before for sex with a minor, and so the police question Jack, who has no alibi. After being challenged by Ellie over her false denial of Mark working in the chalet, Susan confronts Nigel, who angrily tells her to stay away. Maggie Radcliffe suspects that Susan may really be 'Elaine Jones' which Susan denies, and later threatens Maggie. Beth tries to get the police to take Steve more seriously, but they reveal that he is a convicted criminal and warn him to stay away. Hardy and Ellie question Coates, who discloses Danny and Tom's interest in computers: he also has no alibi. Olly confronts Jack: Nigel, witnessing their argument, tells Mark. After a meal with Ellie and her husband Joe, Hardy passes out at the hotel. Becca takes him to the hospital, but Hardy checks himself out, returning to work. Karen convinces the Latimers to help her write a story about the case, which becomes front page news, and leads to the national press descending on Broadchurch, invading the Latimers' privacy. Ellie's sister Lucy is revealed to have financial problems. Jack brings Danny's phone to the Latimers, and says that whatever they may hear about him, they should know that he is innocent. Ellie discovers that a similar killing happened in Yorkshire some years earlier when Jack lived in the area; Jack is seen burning photos of Danny.
5	Episode 5	Euros Lyn	Chris Chibnall	1 April 2013	8.81
The reconstruction, featuring Tom, is staged and is on national television news. Beth confronts Mark about his adultery, telling him that she is pregnant: she later attacks Becca's property and warns her to stay away from the family. This is witnessed by Paul, who has become aware of Becca's debts and a threat from her bank to repossess the hotel. At Karen's suggestion, Olly writes an article about Jack's past, and they sleep together. Mark confirms the phone is Danny's, but Ellie says Danny also owned a smartphone which is still missing. Potentially identifiable cigarette butts found near Danny's body come to light. Ellie refuses to give her sister Lucy money in return for information. Karen and Olly's story is sensationalised by the editor, and suspicion of Jack becomes widespread; Jack does not co-operate with Hardy and Ellie. Dean tells Chloe that Jack hugged and touched him and other boys in the Sea Brigade: they tell Olly and Karen and the allegations are national front page news, worsening Jack's harassment. Jack explains to the police that he was imprisoned for an affair with a 15-year-old girl, whom he married when he was released, but the police refuse him protection. Olly reports that his family's boat is missing, and forensics determine that this is the boat that was burned; Ellie rejects an invitation for a drink with the forensics officer. Susan, who has befriended Tom, declines Nigel's bribe and threat to leave town. A mob, led by Nigel, confronts Jack, but Mark intervenes. Jack gives Mark further details of his marriage: they had a son who died in a car accident caused by Jack's wife, and they later separated. Mark, who slept with Beth when she was 15 and seeing that both men are grieving for lost sons, advises Jack to leave Broadchurch for his own protection. After his car is vandalised, and when the story of his marriage is in the news, Jack kills himself.
6	Episode 6	James Strong	Louise Fox & Chris Chibnall	8 April 2013	8.95
Hardy is having nightmares about the case, increasing medical problems, and is being criticised in the press. At Jack's funeral, Coates accuses the town of failing an innocent man. Hardy sees Coates touching Tom at the reception, and when he tries to ask questions, Tom is interrupted by his father, Joe. Joe jokes with Ellie about him being among the few who are not suspects. Tom angrily tells Chloe he was not Danny's best friend. Danny's hair, fingerprints, and paint chips matching his skateboard are found on the burned boat; it transpires that the boat had been used by many people, including Mark, Nigel, Tom (with Joe's knowledge, but not Ellie's), Danny, and Coates. Tom asks Coates whether deleted files could be recovered. Hardy confronts Coates over his alcoholic past and a previous assault on a child, and their mutual dislike is evident. Beth meets Cate, the mother of one of the murdered girls from the Sandbrook case, who tells her not to trust Hardy. Some weeks after Danny's death, the Latimers are trying to adjust to life, and appear to be becoming closer: Beth has apparently decided to proceed with her pregnancy. Maggie has uncovered information, unrevealed to the viewer but relating to her husband and children, about Susan, who gives Tom Danny's skateboard; when Ellie learns of this, Susan is arrested and refuses to answer any questions until she knows what has happened to her dog, who has been taken by Nigel. A break-in at the summer house leads Hardy and Ellie on a foot chase with an unidentified suspect, which ends when Hardy collapses.
7	Episode 7	James Strong	Chris Chibnall	15 April 2013	9.56
Hardy again discharges himself, but is to be examined by the police's medical officer. Maggie and Olly pressure him into giving them an interview in which he says that his ex-wife accidentally lost key evidence in the Sandbrook case, but he took the blame to protect their teenage daughter; the evidence was the pendant about which Steve had previously disturbed Hardy. The cigarettes found by the body were Susan's, but she has a verified alibi for the time of the murder: she had found the body on an early morning walk, but not reported it. She tells Ellie why she mistrusts the police and press: her husband had sexually abused their two daughters and killed one of them, later killing himself in prison. Susan was pregnant at the time she was being investigated for her involvement in those events, and the baby was removed from her for adoption. Susan tells Ellie she saw Nigel arrive in a boat and leave Danny's body and skateboard on the beach. Nigel is arrested and Susan's dog is found. Susan reveals Nigel is her son, believing he has taken after his father. Nigel claims he was poaching the night Danny died, and Hardy gives him news clippings of his birth family. After Susan and Nigel are released on bail, Nigel threatens Susan, who leaves Broadchurch. Beth and Mark seek counselling from Coates, debating whether to keep their baby. Hardy learns Danny's smartphone was used to report the summer house break-in. Coates gives Hardy Tom's smashed laptop, although Tom has tried to blackmail him not to do so, and says that he once broke up a fight between Tom and Danny. Dean tells the Latimers he went hunting a number of times with Danny and Nigel, while Nigel claimed Mark and Beth had condoned although neither knew of it. Footprints matching Nigel's size are found at the summer house. Hardy asks Ellie about Tom and Danny's fight, of which she knew nothing, and, knowing that it is not in her home, he asks her to bring the laptop in.
8	Episode 8	James Strong	Chris Chibnall	22 April 2013	10.47
After a medical, Hardy is given until the end of the day to finish his placement. Ellie pays Lucy to reveal she saw a man place a bag of clothes into a skip the night Danny died (it was later shown as a wheelie bin). Nigel is re-arrested. With Joe present, Hardy interviews Tom about his laptop, and Danny's emails with Tom and another person, which reveal that the boys had fallen out and that Danny had found another friend. Hardy asks Tom if he killed Danny, and Joe terminates the interview. Danny's smartphone is switched back on, and Hardy traces its signal to the Millers' house. Joe confesses to killing Danny and a flashback reveals that Joe had been meeting Danny secretly at the summer house where Joe started hugging and grooming Danny who eventually threatened to tell his father; Joe panicked and accidentally killed him, before staging his death as an accident. Taking Olly's boat, he brought Danny's body and skateboard to the beach. Interviewed by Hardy, Joe explains that he had given Danny the smartphone and the £500, and that it was he who called from the summer house, intending to confess to Hardy, but he was unwilling to confess in front of Ellie, so he ran. Hardy informs Ellie, who confronts Joe in a rage before being restrained, and moves into a hotel with her children, telling Tom what happened, while Hardy tells the Latimers about Joe. At a press conference, Hardy announces the arrest of a local man, and asks the press for restraint, but Lucy tells Olly, and Karen soon comes to know. Mark confronts Joe in his cell, and Beth challenges Ellie. Ellie and Hardy discuss Joe's psychological problems; both plan to move away from the area. Coates conducts Danny's funeral and later arranges for a series of beacons to be lit along nearby beaches and cliffs in his memory.

=== Supplementary content ===
The final episode of series one finished with a caption reading "Broadchurch Will Return". ITV executives confirmed that a second series of Broadchurch had been commissioned, with production to begin in 2014.

Following episode eight, an extra scene was released on YouTube depicting Danny's wake, held the afternoon after the funeral but before the evening when the beacons were lit. Nigel and Mark were shown reconciled, Olly turned down a job at the Herald, and Hardy spoke to Karen about why he alerted her to Joe's arrest. The video ended with the words "Broadchurch will return".

== Cast ==
Characters in series one of Broadchurch included the following:

=== Police ===
- Detective Inspector Alec Hardy (David Tennant) – an experienced detective who recently arrived in Broadchurch, wanting a quiet life due to his scandal-tinged work history. He has difficulty dealing with Danny's murder because of his involvement in the failed Sandbrook murder case.
- Detective Sergeant Ellie Miller (Olivia Colman) – a local detective married to Joe Miller, and mother to children Tom and Fred. She has a personal connection to Danny's murder, having been friendly with the Latimer family for a number of years. She is angry that the Detective Inspector's job was given to Hardy.
- Chief Superintendent Elaine Jenkinson (Tracey Childs) – head of the Broadchurch police. She appointed Hardy, an old friend, after his troubles during the Sandbrook murder case.

=== The Latimers ===
- Beth Latimer (Jodie Whittaker) – Danny and Chloe's mother and Mark's wife, she is overwhelmed by Danny's death and struggles to trust her husband.
- Mark Latimer (Andrew Buchan) – Danny and Chloe's father and Beth's husband, he is a well-liked plumber. Even as he grieved for his son, his secrets led police to suspect him.
- Chloe Latimer (Charlotte Beaumont) – Beth and Mark's 15-year-old daughter. A student studying for her GCSEs, Chloe is overwhelmed by her brother's sudden death. Her relationship with an older boy, Dean Thomas, is a source of comfort even as it puts stress on the rest of the Latimer family.
- Danny Latimer (Oskar McNamara) – Beth and Mark's 11-year-old son and younger brother of Chloe, his strangled body is found on a beach at the base of seaside cliffs near Broadchurch. His relationship with his family was problematic, and he had many secrets.
- Liz Roper (Susan Brown) – Beth's mother and Danny's grandmother. She is a devoutly religious woman who attempts to help Beth work through her grief.

=== The Millers ===
- Joe Miller (Matthew Gravelle) – Ellie's husband and father to 11-year-old Tom and 1-year-old Fred. He is a former paramedic who is now a stay-at-home father, caring for Fred.
- Tom Miller (Adam Wilson) – Ellie and Joe's 11-year-old elder son, he is a pupil in the final year of primary school. Tom is alleged to be Danny's best friend, though Tom denies this. Delays in interrogating Tom and uncovering the truth about his relationship to Danny lead to problems in the investigation.
- Lucy Stevens (Tanya Franks) – sister of DS Ellie Miller and mother of Oliver "Olly" Stevens, she has a gambling habit and demands money to reveal information regarding Danny's death.

=== Press ===
- Maggie Radcliffe (Carolyn Pickles) – editor of the local newspaper, the Broadchurch Echo. She knows most people in town, and has access to information on various suspects.
- Oliver "Olly" Stevens (Jonathan Bailey) – Ellie Miller's young nephew and a reporter for the Broadchurch Echo. He is highly ambitious, and wants to get a big scoop so he can win a job with a national newspaper.
- Karen White (Vicky McClure) – a reporter for the Daily Herald, a national newspaper. She knows about DI Hardy's work on the failed Sandbrook murder case. Her desire to stop "polishing press releases" and become an investigative reporter brings her to Broadchurch.
- Len Danvers (Simon Rouse) – The boss of Karen White at the Daily Herald.
- Sam Taylor (Alfred Enoch) – journalist with the Daily Herald.

=== Townspeople ===
- Reverend Paul Coates (Arthur Darvill) – a young Anglican priest in Broadchurch. Coates' attempts to comfort members of the community reveals his awkwardness with others, and draws suspicion.
- Susan Wright (Pauline Quirke) – a somewhat unstable but highly observant woman who moved to Broadchurch five months ago. She dislikes many in the town, and lives with her Chocolate Labrador Vince in a caravan near the beach where Danny's body was found.
- Nigel "Nige" Carter (Joe Sims) – Mark Latimer's best friend and plumber's mate, he becomes angry and defensive when questioned about his relationship with Danny.
- Jack Marshall (David Bradley) – the owner of a newsagent and snack shop near the beach. Danny delivered newspapers for him, which gave Jack daily access to the boy early morning when few others were about. Jack's past is a mystery to most in town.
- Dean Thomas (Jacob Anderson) – a 17-year-old local boy, he is the boyfriend of Chloe Latimer. Because Chloe is not yet 16, Dean must keep his sexual relationship with Chloe a secret.
- Becca Fisher (Simone McAullay) – the owner and manager of the Trader Hotel, where DI Hardy stays after his move to Broadchurch. She had an affair with Mark Latimer and appears little concerned with Danny's death and more interested in her guests' needs.
- Steve Connelly (Will Mellor) – a worker for a local telephone company, he claims to be psychic. He causes problems when he says that Danny's spirit told him the murderer is someone close to the Latimer family.

== Production ==
Broadchurch was created and written by Chris Chibnall, and produced by Kudos Film and Television in association with Shine America and Imaginary Friends. (Note: Kudos Film and Television is a subsidiary of Shine Group. Shine America is the American subsidiary of Shine Group. Imaginary Friends is a production company established by Chris Chibnall to produce author-driven dramas.) Chibnall served as executive producer along with Kudos' Jane Featherstone, while Richard Stokes was producer.

=== Conception ===
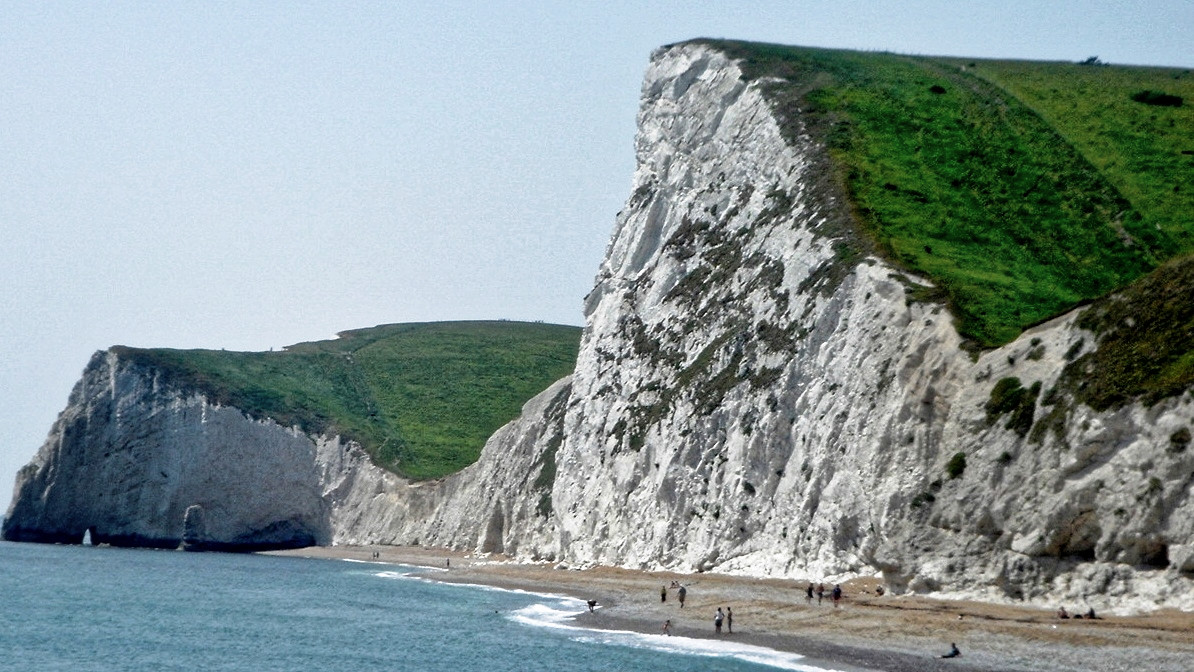
The Jurassic Coast of Dorset provided inspiration for Broadchurch.

Broadchurch creator and writer Chris Chibnall described the project as a labour of love. He spent more than a decade in the United Kingdom working on various television programmes, and initially conceived Broadchurch about 2003 while working on his first series, Born and Bred. The concept was to explore how a child's murder affects a small, close-knit community, and how the characters react to the media attention and the mutual suspicion that arises.

The location for the series was partly inspired by the Jurassic Coast in Dorset, where Chibnall lived. Chibnall says that he initially did not have a location in mind for Broadchurch, but work-related issues made setting the show in Dorset appealing. From 2006 to 2011, Chibnall had spent most of his time travelling about the U.K. and Ireland, working on Torchwood, Law & Order: UK, and Camelot. Setting the show in Dorset meant Chibnall would not have to spend time away from his home and family. Chibnall's decision to set the show on the Jurassic Coast also helped him generate more ideas for the show and tighten the writing. For example, Dorset's most famous native son, poet and author Thomas Hardy, lent his last name to one of the main characters (DI Alec Hardy). Thomas Hardy's use of the term "Wessex" was used as the name of the fictional Wessex Police, and character Jack Marshall reads the Hardy novel Jude the Obscure. Chibnall also drew heavily on Hardy's concept of a "wrathful god" for the series.

Even the title of the series came from the Dorset setting. Chibnall invented the name "Broadchurch" based on two towns in Dorset: "I thought a lot about the literary heritage of this county. In true Thomas Hardy style I came up with a compound location name of Broadchurch combining the West Dorset hamlets of Broadstone and Whitchurch."

=== Writing ===
[I]t was like the material was speaking to me and telling me what it should be. It felt so inevitable then, and so right, and everything I wanted to talk about within the piece was served by that idea as well.

— Chris Chibnall, "'Broadchurch' postmortem: Creator Chris Chibnall on the killer, key scenes, and keeping the secret", Entertainment Weekly, 25 September 2013

Chibnall wrote the script for Broadchurch on spec after his work on Camelot ended. Chibnall had a very unhappy experience working on Camelot, and fell ill with pneumonia after leaving the show. While taking time off to recover, he began using whiteboards in May 2011 to create backgrounds for each character and craft the plot of Broadchurch—which he envisioned as being a trilogy. Series one was written to work both as the first part of a trilogy as well as a self-contained drama. The first series had to be self-contained, he felt, in case the show did not do well in the ratings and a second series was not commissioned.

Chibnall was adamant that Broadchurch not be a "whodunit". His concept was to show how a murder "makes victims of the whole community in all sorts of different ways. Some of them are able to deal with that and recover from that and build something from it; for some people it means they're destroyed by that so I wanted to look basically at a whole set of characters affected by this one devastating event and the different effects it had on people, so it really made sense of that and played straight into that central idea." His scripts then focused on what it would be like for each character to live through an actual murder investigation and its aftermath. This required removing as much police procedure from the scripts as possible, and focusing on character development.

Chibnall was assisted in the story process by his good friends Sam Hoyle (a television script executive) and television director James Strong. Broadchurch was influenced, Chibnall says, by two American television shows, Twin Peaks (created by Mark Frost and David Lynch) and Murder One (created by Steven Bochco, Charles H. Eglee, and Channing Gibson). (Note: A number of critics have pointed out a wide range of similarities between Broadchurch and the Danish television series Forbrydelsen ("The Crime" or "The Killing"), which aired in the U.K. and was a major hit. Others have pointed to similarities with The Killing, the American remake of the Danish show. Chibnall, however, has not acknowledged either series as an influence.)

The story was nearly finished on the whiteboards when Chibnall began writing the script. After about two weeks, Chibnall had a draft of the first few episodes. Ellie Miller was a lesbian in the first draft of the script, and there was no Joe Miller. But he felt that this did not work well narratively, so he changed the character to a married heterosexual. But he had not yet settled on a killer. "Often as a writer, you get your first draft out, and then you look and think, 'Now, what have I got here'," Chibnall said in an interview with Entertainment Weekly. "You're really just throwing mud at the wall and then going, 'Oh, there's a pattern there.' " Chibnall knew, however, that the killer had to be someone close to Ellie. About two weeks later, Chibnall woke one morning and realised the murderer should be Joe Miller, DS Ellie Miller's husband. "[I]t was the lightbulb moment above my head—which you never get as a writer, frankly. I've never had it before, probably won't ever have it again. I was, like, 'Ohmygod, it's Joe. It can't be anyone else.' " By making Joe the killer, Chibnall focused the series more closely on Ellie Miller, and improved the narrative structure so that it became about two families (the Millers and the Latimers). He then redrafted the first script and re-plotted and re-outlined the series. The killer's identity was "embedded" (as Chibnall described it) into the script before he brought the project to ITV. However, Chibnall kept the script loose enough that he could choose another character as the murderer, in case his preferred solution leaked to the press during shooting. (Note: Chibnall told the website Inside Media Track that even his first rough draft of the series had Joe Miller as the killer. The "lightbulb moment" only confirmed this, he said.)

Despite his confidence that he had the right solution to the murder mystery, Chibnall said that minutes before episode eight was to air in April 2013, he called executive producer Jane Featherstone and told her that he had got the ending completely wrong, before changing his mind twenty minutes later.

I knew the start would be a body being found. How did this affect this person, and that person? In that first episode are the ripples, that's how you meet everybody, how they hear, how they are affected. I don't let anyone off. At every point of plotting I'd ask myself, "What would the characters do?" It was never, "Here's a big plot twist." I wasn't looking at it structurally. Everything in this came from character. It's not just about the event of Danny's murder, it's what the event means.

— Chris Chibnall, "Broadchurch: the perfect TV murder?", Radio Times, 22 April 2013

There were three key elements in the writing process. First, Chibnall largely ignored traditional concepts about narrative structure when writing the teleplay. Instead, he focused on how the murder affected each character, and let each character's responses drive the story. His lone concession to narrative structure was driven by the need to insert a commercial break every 11 to 12 minutes. He chose to insert a surprising or shocking moment just before each break to encourage viewers to keep watching. This forced Chibnall to "aggressively plot" each episode, keeping the story as tight as possible so that he could focus on character development. Second, Chibnall emphasised the role of the local newspaper in the series. Having lived in the small Dorset town of Bridport, Chibnall saw how local newspapers had a major impact on their communities despite the prominence of new media such as the Internet. He created a fictional local newspaper, the Broadchurch Echo, and made it not only an element of the story (revealing information to which characters react) but also a character in the story itself, motivated by the people who work there. Third, Chibnall planned for a visual rather than dialogue-driven finale. Chibnall wanted the final episode of Broadchurch to be different from the typical murder-mystery series. He observed that most finales saved major revelations until the final minutes of the final episode. He felt this led to poor writing, with loose plot threads "hastily" tied up and no way for the audience to adjust emotionally to the new information. Chibnall decided his "reveal" would occur early in the final episode, and more time would be given to depicting the impact of the reveal on the characters. He also wanted to avoid a revealing which was primarily verbal, as occurred in many detective novels. Chibnall wanted his reveal to be visual and highly cinematic, and for time to slow down during the reveal to heighten the audience's tension. This, he felt, would help the audience feel as if they were actually part of the drama, as if they were really experiencing these events themselves.

Only the first few episodes of Broadchurch series one were written before filming began. Chibnall waited until casting was complete and he saw the actors performing their roles. The later scripts were then shaped to take advantage of these performances.

=== Production approval ===
Chibnall initially considered pitching Broadchurch to the pay-TV channel Sky Atlantic, but thought his project was good enough to sell to ITV, the biggest and most popular commercial television channel in the United Kingdom. Chibnall worried, however, that it would be difficult to convince ITV to turn over a substantial block of prime time programming hours to a series which would last eight episodes. (Note: Most British series which are built around solving a single murder conclude in three to five episodes.)

In autumn 2011, Chibnall pitched Broadchurch to Laura Mackie, the Head of Drama at ITV, who proved very enthusiastic about the proposal. Just days after she finished reading the scripts, she suggested Chibnall work with Kudos Film and Television, a well-known production company. Kudos immediately agreed to produce the series. Mackie then brought the show to ITV Director of Television Peter Fincham, who green-lit the project almost immediately. ITV wanted the series to air in early 2013, which meant that filming had to occur in the summer of 2012. That gave Broadchurch a much shorter pre-production schedule than usual. ITV wanted a high-quality series despite the time constraint. According to Chibnall, ITV advised him to make the series as bold as possible and to ignore commercial considerations. Fincham and Chibnall discussed stripping Broadchurch over a series of four or five nights, rather than as a weekly program. But both men rejected the idea. Fincham was keen to allow speculation to build over time, and to give viewers a chance to engage in conversation about each episode before the next one aired. (Note: According to executive producer Jane Featherstone, another key element was to leave it unclear whether Joe Miller was a paedophile or not, as this encouraged viewers to keep discussing the show even though they knew who the murderer was.)

Pre-production began almost immediately after Broadchurch was given the green light. Heads for each department of the production—cinematography and lighting, editing, casting, make-up and hair, costuming, locations, administration, sound, etc.—were hired, and research began in all areas of production. Test footage was shot and screened for ITV executives at a pre-shoot meeting, so they could see more clearly what the series' mood and style would be like. Although ITV made a sizeable financial investment in Broadchurch, additional funds were needed because of the cost of the large ensemble cast. Additional funds were sought from international partners, who were given distribution rights in their territories in return. Before principal photography began, ZDF (German public-service television broadcaster) and BBC America (the American cable and satellite television network jointly owned by the BBC and AMC Networks) came aboard the production as financial partners.

=== Casting ===
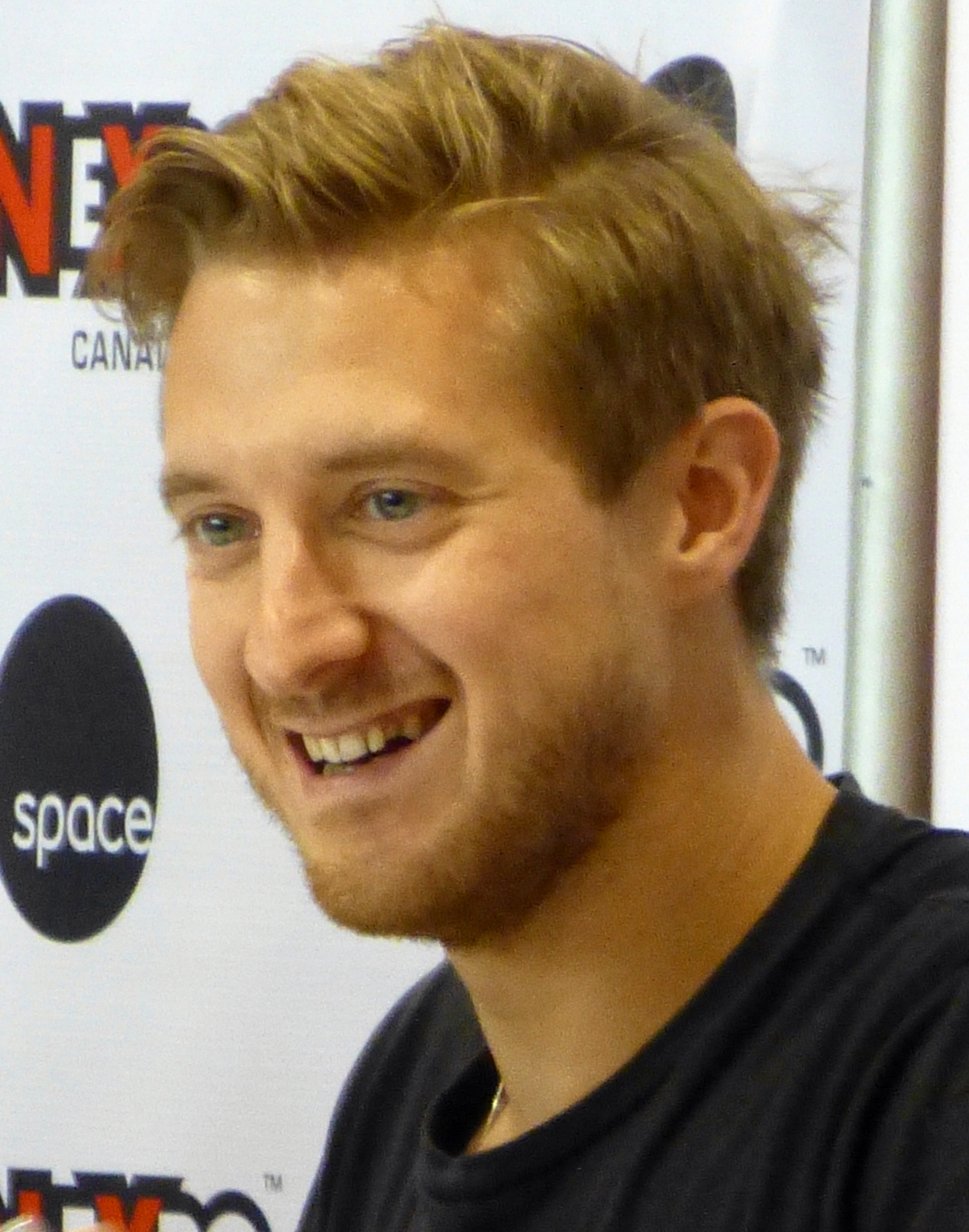
Arthur Darvill was the first actor cast for Broadchurch, in April 2012.

Casting for Broadchurch series one was overseen by casting directors Kelly Valentine Hendry and Victor Jenkins of VHJ Casting.

Chibnall was inspired by ITV's hit show Downton Abbey to cast only top actors. "I said, 'We have to have cast as good as Downton. ...That was absolutely my shameless aim, to go, 'Okay, you have to look at our poster and feel that's going to give Downton a run for its money.' " Executive producers Chibnall and Featherstone and producer Richard Stokes held extensive discussions with the casting directors, who then generated lists of potential actors to whom the producers might wish to offer roles or ask to audition. The casting directors also read all the finished scripts, met with location scouts to see photographs of the anticipated location shoots, and had long discussions with various production department heads to gather as much information as possible so they could choose the right performers to audition. A key rule for the casting team was "no wankers allowed", as Featherstone put it. The production team refused to consider egotistical, obnoxious, vain, temperamental, or arrogant actors for roles, as they felt it made it difficult for both cast and crew to do their best work.

==== Leads ====
The role of Reverend Paul Coates was written with actor Arthur Darvill in mind, and was the first role cast. Darvill was offered a role in Broadchurch in April 2012 while filming "The Angels Take Manhattan", his final appearance on Doctor Who. Darvill accepted without knowing what role he was to play or having read any scripts. Only later did Chibnall tell Darvill that the role was that of a young Anglican priest struggling with alcoholism. Darvill says that, as Chibnall wrote the scripts, he would call Darvill and tell him what he was thinking of doing with the character of Coates. Chibnall's writing of the character was, in a way, collaborative: "We talked a lot about the role of a vicar in a community like that and what are the implications of the circumstances that the town is put in," said Darvill, "and what that means for someone in that position and certainly the responsibility of having to be a spiritual guide, a point of comfort, a figurehead, especially being quite young." Darvill was very interested in the way Coates always felt he was in the public spotlight (even in a private setting) and the burden that Coates felt in being a moral guide and trustworthy person. Darvill was also intrigued by the way Coates struggled to avoid letting his ego come into play once he became a spokesperson for the community, and the way Coates reacted when he became a police suspect. Darvill was also pleased that Chibnall said he would not permit any bad attitudes or diva-like behavior on the set. "Early on I knew it was going to be good because Chris said...[e]veryone has to be nice and good."

The role of DS Ellie Miller was the second role cast. Producer Jane Featherstone first suggested Olivia Colman for the role of Ellie Miller, to which Chibnall (having also had her in mind) immediately agreed. Chibnall then specifically wrote the role of Ellie Miller for Colman, hoping she would agree to join the cast. There was consensus among the producers to offer the job to Colman without the need for an audition. (Note: This is contradicted by an interview Colman gave to Radio Times in January 2015 in which she says auditioned more than once.) Colman says she was immediately drawn to the role: "From the off I really liked the idea of the story, a hard story and an upsetting one, but I liked the idea of a whole community being affected by something and I liked the character of Ellie. ... And I liked Ellie. I find it hard to play a character if I can't feel any of me in them. Especially if you are going to be playing that person through the whole series you need to feel that connection." She was also highly impressed with the script she read, calling the script one she "couldn't put down" and that she turned the pages "frantically" because it was such a good read. Colman says she also had heard that David Tennant and actress Vicky McClure were under consideration for roles as well, and she wanted very much to work with them. She accepted the role immediately after reading the script.

[The fact that] I read [the script] from cover to cover in one pass and was left at the end of the first episode desperately wanting to know what happens next was telling. That initial response is always worth noting; the first time you read the script is the closest you will be able to watch it as a viewer. If it grabs you and you want to know more, and if you're intrigued by the characters in that first moment, that's always something to be pursued.

— David Tennant, "Broadchurch: A new drama for ITV", 6 February 2013.

The role of DI Alec Hardy was the third role cast. The producers "very early on" settled on David Tennant as their preferred choice. (Note: According to Jane Featherstone, Tennant and Colman were asked to join the series at the same time.) Tennant had worked with Chibnall and Strong on Doctor Who, and was highly regarded by production executives. Once more, there was consensus among the producers to offer the part without the need for an audition. Tennant was given the scripts for the first two episodes. He agreed to take the role for several reasons, even though he knew an incomplete script was a professional gamble. First, he was deeply impressed with the writing. Second, he had worked with Chibnall and Strong (who had agreed to be the show's primary director) before and was keen to work with them again. Third, he learned that Olivia Colman had agreed to play DS Miller, and working with her was very appealing.

==== Other major characters ====
All the remaining roles were cast around Colman and Tennant. All these roles were cast via auditions, which took several weeks. Although Chibnall had determined who the murderer was by the time casting began, those who auditioned for the program were not told the killer's identity.

Actor Andrew Buchan was attracted to the role of Mark Latimer by the authentic quality of the part. The way Chibnall showed how the community is affected by the murder, the newly unsettled relationships between the characters, and the disintegration of the bonds between people who once trusted one another also deeply attracted him to the project. Buchan says he was worried that he wouldn't get the part. His audition scene was where Mark Latimer must identify the body of his son in the Broadchurch morgue. To win the role, he worked himself up intensely and cried profusely. After winning the role, he researched the way parents react to a child's murder in order to treat the role with as much respect and accuracy as possible.

The role of Karen White was the other part cast early in the process. Actress Vicky McClure admitted, "It was quite a difficult role to take on and I had to think quite carefully about it." To help her get into character, McClure specifically asked that the hair designers give her artificial hair integrations.

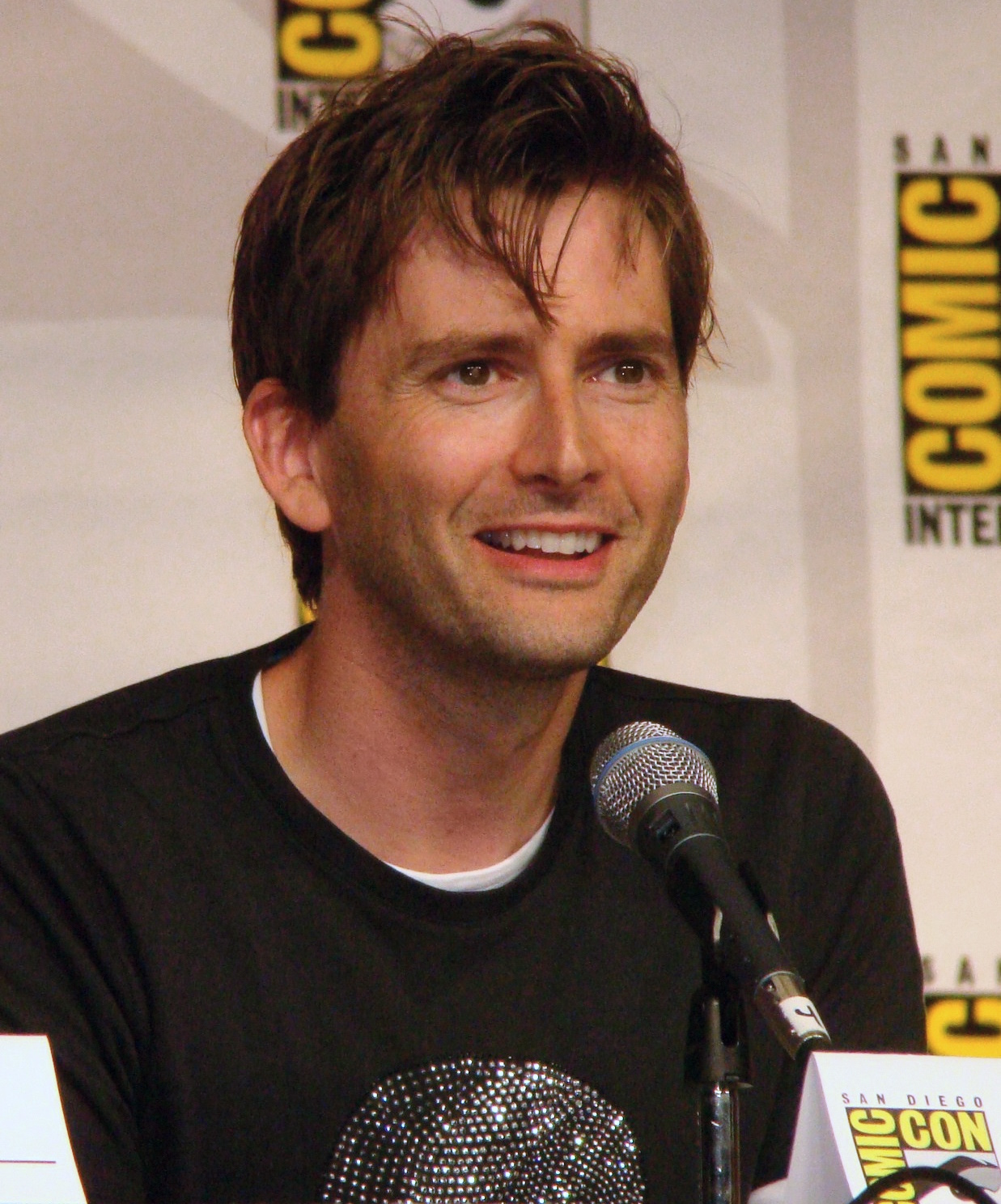
David Tennant accepted the role of DI Hardy after learning that Olivia Colman had been cast.

Jodie Whittaker was cast as Beth Latimer, the mother of the murdered boy. She was hired after Buchan and McClure joined the series. Her audition consisted of several scenes from the first episode. Whittaker admitted that she was very nervous about accepting a role in a series whose scripts had not yet been completed. Chris Chibnall, however, told her that none of the actors would know who the murderer was (not even the actor who played the killer) until the last possible moment. She found that highly appealing, for it raised the anxiety level in the actors and reduced each actor's willingness to trust the other characters. She was also impressed by the heart-breaking way the first episode was written, and how many interesting characters there were in the series.

Actor Joe Sims was cast as Nigel "Nige" Carter, Mark Latimer's best friend and co-worker who has several secrets to hide. Sims says he was hired relatively early in the casting process. Broadchurch appealed to him because he had seen the television film United, which had been written by Chris Chibnall and directed by James Strong. He loved their work, and very much wanted to be part of their next project. He got the chance to audition because he had met Sam Hoyle socially some years before, and this connection—along with heavy lobbying by his agents—won him a meeting with director Strong and casting directors Hendry and Jenkins. Sims admits that he was very nervous in his first audition, and auditioned several more times before getting the part. He believes his auditions improved each time, as he learned more about the plot at each audition (which involved reading new scenes).

Matthew Gravelle was cast as Joe Miller, DS Miller's husband. Gravelle auditioned along with many other actors for the role, but Chibnall says that the casting team early on considered Gravelle their top choice for the role. (Note: Gravelle had worked for producer Richard Stokes in an episode of the series Holby City, and for Stokes and writer Chris Chibnall in "End of Days", an episode of Torchwood. In 2010, he had been nominated for a BAFTA Cymru award as Best Actor for his work on Y Pris.) The producers knew that this was a critical casting decision. Whoever they hired to play Joe Miller would need to step up their acting game significantly in the final episode, so they researched Gravelle's past acting roles and watched as many of his performances as they could find. Chibnall paid particularly close attention to the Welsh language television series Teulu, in which Gravelle had recently played a lead role.

==== Minor characters ====
Australian actress Simone McAullay was cast as local hotelkeeper Becca Fisher, with whom Mark Latimer has an adulterous affair. Chibnall had long envisioned Becca as an Australian, which made her an outsider in the Broadchurch community. He also relied on the common assumption that Australians often seem bolder than most British, which gave the character licence to say things others might not. McAullay received the first two scripts from her agent, and a short written sketch of the Dorset setting. She videotaped an audition at her home in Sydney, and sent it to Chibnall.

Thirty-six-year-old actor Will Mellor was cast as telephone installer and alleged psychic Steve Connolly. Chibnall had written the Connolly character to be in his 50s. Mellor, however, auditioned for the role even though he was not the right age. He was cast, says Chibnall, because "Will came in and read and just blew it out the water. And it was just, well, you have to give the part to him because he's redefined it!'."

Pauline Quirke was cast as secretive caravan resident Susan Wright. Chibnall had long been deeply impressed with her performance on the 1996 television series The Sculptress, and he wrote the role of Susan Wright with Quirke in mind, although the role was not written specifically for her. Although Quirke was a well-known veteran television actress, she auditioned along with many others for the role. Her audition, like that of others, used scenes from the first two episodes. Chibnall says that the producers worried that such a big star might not wish to do justice to such small role, but found that Quirke delivered a superb performance.

Casting for Broadchurch was complete in late June 2012, and casting choices announced on 2 July 2012.

=== Principal photography ===
Broadchurch locations

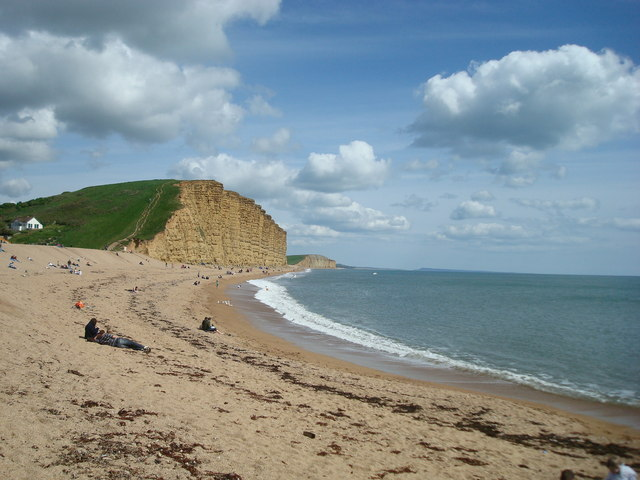
Harbour Cliff and Harbour Cliff Beach, the most prominent locations used in Broadchurch.

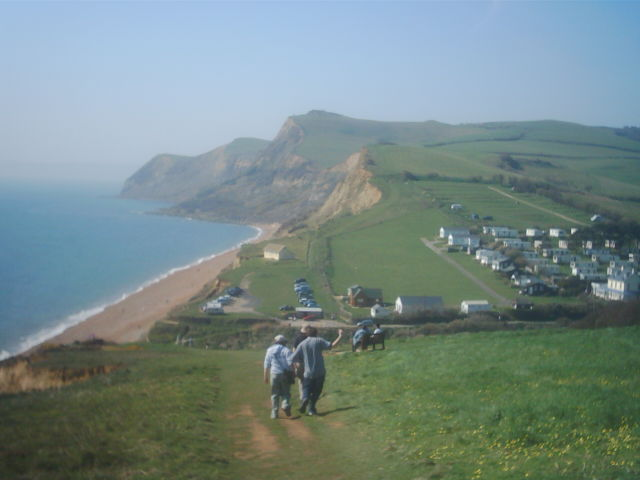
Briar Cliff Hut (center of image) served as the exterior location for Danny Latimer's murder.

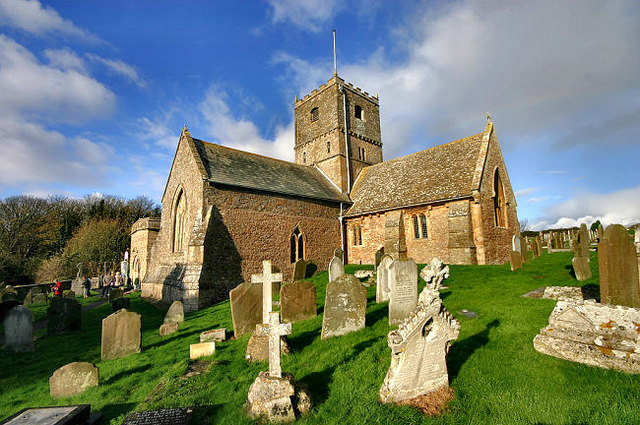
St Andrew's Church, Clevedon, provided exteriors and interiors for the fictional Broadchurch parish church.

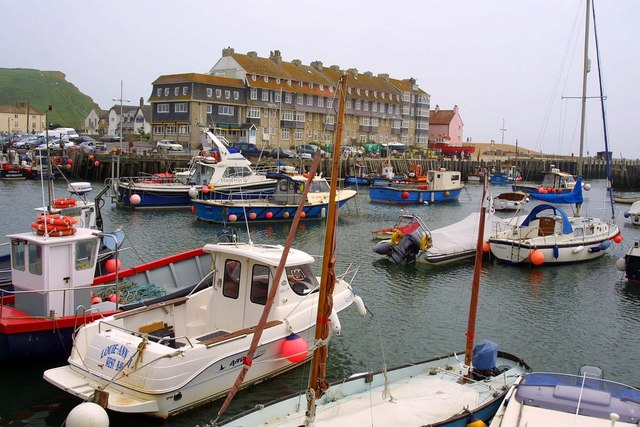
West Bay Harbour with the East Pier in the background. This area depicted the Broadchurch harbour.

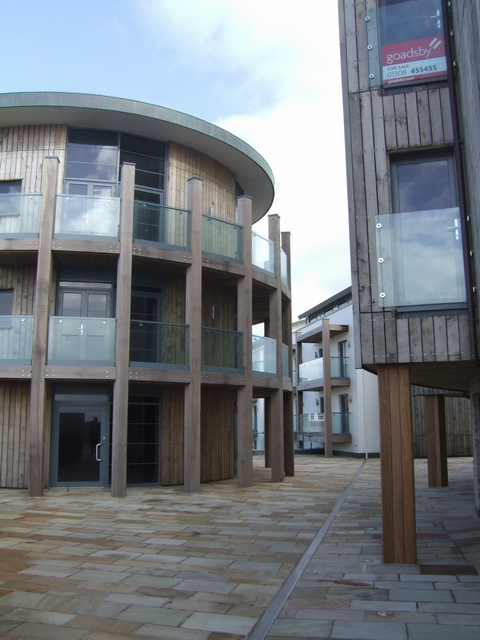
The Folly, a private apartment building, provided exteriors for the fictional Wessex Police.

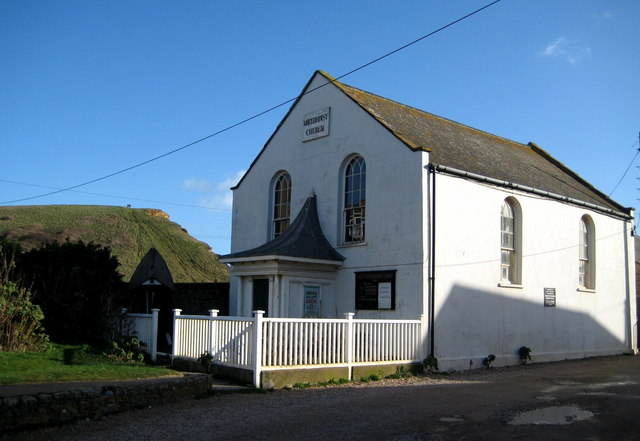
The Methodist Chapel provided the exterior for the fictional Sea Brigade Hall.

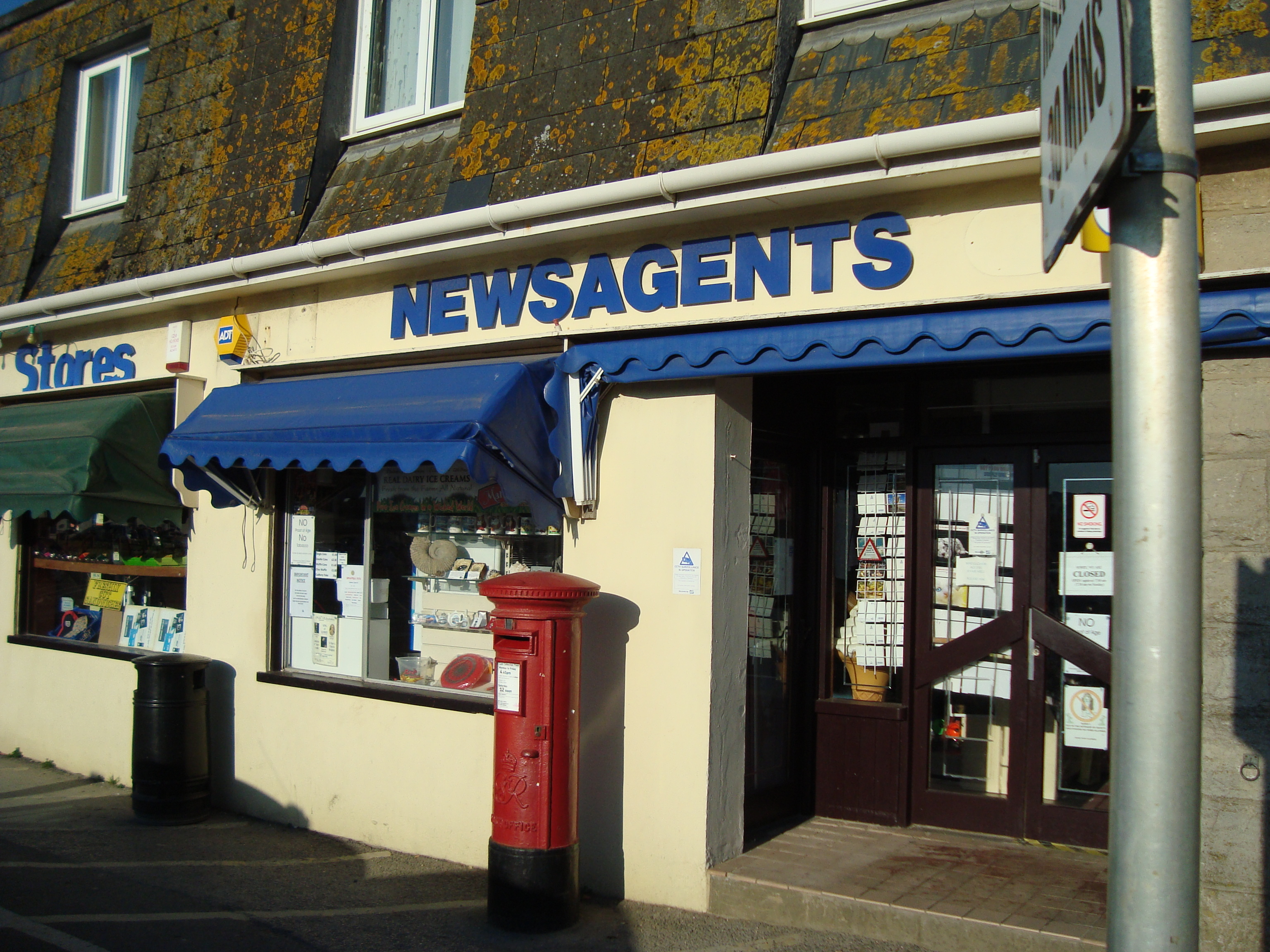
Harbour Newsagent in Bridport provided exteriors for Jack Marshall's news shop.

James Strong directed five episodes of series one of Broadchurch, while Euros Lyn directed three. Strong had helped Chibnall with the creative process of writing the story, and agreed to come aboard the project as director even before casting occurred. Matt Gray was hired as both director of photography and camera operator.

==== Location shooting ====
Most of Broadchurch series one was shot on location, which the producers felt would heighten the reality and intimacy of the series. Location shooting was also important because the Dorset coast was integral to setting the mood of the drama. Director James Strong said the goal was to make Broadchurch "look and feel different", "a world that was recognisable but in subtle extremis—an ordinary seaside town where events have upset the natural order of life. It is a lovely, beautiful place where something terrible has happened." Strong chose a visual style that emphasised contradictory elements, such as privacy and publicity, the natural and unnatural, or water and fire. Another part of the visual style was to connect the characters to the Dorset landscape. To achieve this, locations were chosen which would allow the characters to bring their private behaviors outside. A third element of the visual style was to use the change in seasons to help illuminate the way the emotional tenor of the drama changes during the series.

The first cast read-through occurred at Bloomsbury Central Baptist Church in London on 7 August 2012. Principal photography began on interior sets at VISION Studios on 13 August 2012. Location shooting began the first week of September. Joel Holmes was the location manager, and he helped identify nearly all the locations used for shooting. Most location photography occurred in the town of Clevedon in North Somerset. The production's headquarters were located in the town's Salthouse Fields parking lot. Some scenes were also shot in the towns of Bridport and West Bay and in the surrounding district of West Dorset. Three locations were used in the area around the town of Yate, Gloucestershire, with the "Road to Nowhere" used for filming as well as the production's headquarters.

==== Studio shooting and shooting schedule ====
Not all shooting was done on location. Some sets were built at VISION Studios near Bristol (where the television series Skins had just finished filming). According to producer Richard Stokes, the studio sets were interiors, because equipment needs made it impractical to film on location, and included the Wessex Police Station. Two shots required "green screen" to composite images together. These green screen shots were filmed at Waterloo Film Studios in London.

Broadchurch was shot in order. Very few scripted television programs are filmed in the order episodes are seen on the air. It is far more common to shoot out-of-order. Usually, scripts are broken down into their component scenes and shots. Scenes using the same locations or sets are shot at the same time, to minimise the time and expense of moving cameras and equipment. Broadchurch, however, was shot in order to keep the identity of the murderer a secret until the end of the production.

Weather proved to be a hindrance to the production, and sometimes delayed shooting. Luckily, the sun shone during the first week of September 2012, which was also the first week of location shooting. But skies were partly or completely overcast for the remainder of the shoot. Additional location shooting occurred the last week of October and first week of November. The weather turned much colder, with heavy rain and gale-force winds these two weeks. Location shooting atop Harbour Cliff was scheduled for the first few days of November, but the weather created such safety concerns that this had to be cancelled. The production moved to Clevedon, and the clifftop filming was rescheduled for a few days later. (Luckily, the weather had cleared by then.)

==== Acting ====
The first read-through for Broadchurch series one occurred on Tuesday, 7 August 2012. Rehearsals were kept to a minimum. To heighten the raw and tension-filled tone of the show, actors were often prevented from seeing the space they were to perform in until shooting began. However, almost no improvisation of dialogue occurred on the set. This was a choice made by the actors. Olivia Colman said, "[Chibnall wrote] it so beautifully, so completely and utterly beautifully, that I would have felt faintly ridiculous approaching him and saying, 'Can I change it?' "

The script laid out how characters were to move and behave, but the actors themselves chose how to bring these directions to life. For example, when Alec Hardy tells Ellie Miller that her husband is the murderer, the script called for Hardy to come round to Miller's side of the table and for Miller to vomit after the revelation. David Tennant was allowed to improvise how he came round the table and whether he sat or stood. Olivia Colman improvised the portrayal of nausea by rising, crouching, turning to the wall, and vomiting. Director James Strong knew that this put stress on his technical crew, who often had to guess what technical adjustments had to be made (such as lighting or the placement of microphones) in order to accommodate this unusual style of direction and acting. But he felt this spontaneity freed the cast and permitted them to deliver far more intense performances. A heavy reliance was also placed on getting the first take right, as Strong believed the first take was more spontaneous and more natural. Subsequently, most of what the viewer sees in Broadchurch series one are first takes.

Actor Matthew Gravelle took his role as murderer and possible paedophile Joe Miller very seriously. "You don't want to get it wrong with whoever you're playing. You try to be as true to somebody who might actually be like that as possible," Gravelle said. "Whatever happens, he's still ultimately not a good person and you've got to try and be sympathetic towards him just to see it from his point of view." He did not research paedophilia per se, but tried to discover research on individuals with pre-paedophiliac tendences. He found there was little scientific research in the area. Gravelle was therefore forced to come up with his own rationales for Joe's crimes. "The need to be loved was the root of it," he said. "Joe had love but he didn't have the attention in the way that he got it from Danny. It's probably an ego thing. ... He's not working. It's a self-worth issue."

Filming the scene in which DS Miller confronts her murderous husband required some special care. The scene had been suggested by Olivia Colman. During her first meeting with Chibnall and Featherstone to discuss her character, she asked, "I just want to know, do we get him [the killer] and do I get to kick him in the balls?" Although no such scene had been written, they assured her it would be included (assuming Ellie Miller was not the murderer). Actors Olivia Colman and Matthew Gravelle were kept apart before the scene was filmed as a means of heightening the tension between the two during their meeting. The scene called for Colman to attack Gravelle, who would fall to the ground and allow Colman to kick him in the back. Gravelle's back was fitted with safety padding, but Colman's performance was so intense that she kicked him too hard and Gravelle was bruised for three weeks.

==== Visual style ====
I didn't want it to feel like we've been shielding [Joe Miller] all along. I think there's enough subtle clues in there that you can pick it up and work it out. I never wanted it to be a cheat. I wanted it to feel like you could piece this together and you could have your suspicions and they could be proved correct.

— Chris Chibnall, "'Broadchurch' postmortem: Creator Chris Chibnall on the killer, key scenes, and keeping the secret", Entertainment Weekly, 25 September 2013

Director of photography Matt Gray said he approached Broadchurch as if it were a documentary film, rather than a television drama. Strong and Gray settled on a visual theory about "an emotional and physical landscape". Their goal was to depict the physical landscape in a way that differed visually from the emotions they were trying to depict. To do this, fixed television cameras were used to photograph the geographical landscape (beaches, cliffs, the estate field behind the Latimer house, etc.) and for establishing shots of interiors. A Steadicam or hand-held camera was used when the episode needed to depict the emotional relationships between people. This allowed the cinematographer to get very close to the actors without interfering with their performances.

Although Gray's cinematography was not nominated for a BAFTA Craft Award, it won high praise from Mike Hale in The New York Times, who said "the cinematography of Matt Gray, whose shots from every possible angle of the dramatic cliffs behind the Broadchurch beach[,] are essential to the show's ambience." Allison Willmore at the industry publication Indiewire was equally effusive. Broadchurch series one was "wonderfully shot by cinematographer Matt Gray, who seems to make the oceanside backdrop only more beautiful as the characters in front of it fall apart."

Visual clues to the killer's identity were given throughout the series. In the first episode, Mark Latimer walks along the Broadchurch High Street on his way to work in the morning. Director Strong asked actors Matthew Gravelle (Joe Miller) and Adam Wilson (Tom Miller) to improvise some father-son horseplay. Viewers could thus see Joe with his arm around Tom's neck, "strangling" him. The slug in the Miller household, first seen in episode two, is meant to indicate that there is something wrong in the Miller family. Joe's visits to the skatepark in episodes three and six indicate not only his link to Danny Latimer but also his desire to be around young boys with whom he could form a relationship similar to the one he had with Danny.

The producers and director James Strong paid particular attention to the visual style of the reveal. Chibnall wanted to expose the murderer's identity visually and dynamically, not through dialogue in a static scene on a set. During a location site visit prior to filming, Chibnall, Strong, and Holmes walked from the house at Lavington Close to the house on St Andrews Drive. As they crossed a footbridge over the Land Yeo, Chibnall—struck by the scenery of the area—realised that a single, uncut point of view shot of DI Hardy walking through the Miller house, through the garden, and into the garden shed was the way to reveal the killer's identity. Chibnall and Strong decided that the shot in the first episode of Mark Latimer walking through the Broadchurch High Street should mimic this reveal shot in the eighth episode.

Costumes for Broadchurch were designed by freelance costume designer Ray Holman. Holman worked with the actors portraying major characters to ensure that the costumes fit the character. He spent hours discussing the characters with the actors, and sometimes took the actors shopping or to costume suppliers to find the right look. Holman crafted the "old and saggy" look of Alec Hardy's character to reflect the fact that Hardy "didn't really care what he wore." Often arriving on the set at 6 a.m., Holman ensured that Tennant's suit was appropriately crumpled every day. Holman also designed Ellie Miller's "unflattering grey work suit". Holman and actress Olivia Colman agreed that Ellie was a person who had lived in a small town her entire life. Having been a uniformed police officer, she had worked her way up in the ranks but still retained an unconscious desire to appear in uniform. The grey trouser suit was critical to that look. "I did apologise to her about that, but it looked fantastic and characterised her," Holman said. Beth Lattimer's red dress, seen in episode one, was also Holman's idea. There was disagreement about it, but Holman said he insisted on the red dress. "I wanted the red dress because I knew it would move quite beautifully and she has to run on the beach and I wanted the red against the cliffs," he said.

Principal photography on Broadchurch series one concluded on Tuesday, 4 December 2012.

=== Secrecy campaign ===
==== Efforts to ensure secrecy ====
Chibnall was determined to ensure that the identity of the killer did not leak until the final episode aired. One reason for the secrecy was obviously commercial, for it kept viewers watching. But Chibnall also believed it would enhance the acting. "There was a number of reasons for it, one of which was obviously that a lot of the story was driven from characters in the show not knowing, so it enables those characters to behave truthfully in that situation. And also what I wanted was for every performer to slightly suspect their character, and to really think about that, and to suspect each other. ... So what you get is ambiguity, and what it also means is that any of the performer or performers who are responsible for what happened aren't flagging it or signaling it in any way whatsoever." The producers discussed the need for secrecy at length during pre-production and agreed it was essential. Chibnall also discussed secrecy issues with directors James Strong and Euros Lyn, and they both agreed to its necessity before coming aboard the project. As roles were cast, Chibnall also explained to each actor that the killer's identity would be kept from them until near the end of the production.

Several means were employed to maintain secrecy. All scripts contained a watermark that ensured they could not be photocopied, and copies of scripts used on the set were kept in a safe. Only Chibnall and four other individuals knew at the start of production who the killer would be; even ITV Director of Television Peter Fincham was not told the killer's identity until the first few days of March 2013. All cast and crew were required to sign documents in which they agreed not to reveal the killer's identity.

In part, secrecy was also maintained by the way scripts were written. Performers were given the first two scripts at the start of principal photography, but additional scripts were written only after Chibnall had observed the actors bringing their characters to life. Once the scripts for episodes six, seven, and eight were finished, they were released all at once—but only to those crew and cast who had a need to know. These three episodes were then shot together.

==== Revealing the secret to the cast ====
Olivia Colman was the first cast member to learn the killer's identity—having been informed during her first meeting with the producers. Colman told Radio Times that she asked who the killer was, and was told. An hour later, she was told that the killer's identity would remain a secret and that she should not tell anyone. Somehow, David Tennant's agent learned that Colman knew the murderer's identity, and told David Tennant midway through the production that Colman knew. Tennant did not believe it. Colman later said that Tennant was angry at learning the truth.

Actor Matthew Gravelle (who played murderer Joe Miller) was the second cast member to learn the killer's identity. Chibnall called to tell him two weeks before the final three scripts filmed. (Note: In an interview with the Belfast Telegraph, Chibnall later claimed to have told Gravelle the night before shooting began on episode eight.) By this time, Gravelle was already on the set of another television production. Chibnall kept his revelation short, saying, "It's you." Gravelle paused for about 20 seconds, and then said, "Oh, brilllllliant." He was very enthused to be able to play what were going to be critical scenes at the end of the series. But he also admitted he had never guessed he was going to be the killer. Over the next few days, Chibnall and Gravelle had many long conversations to discuss Joe Miller's backstory and motivation, how to integrate the filmed performance with the upcoming performance, and how Gravelle could play the character going forward.

Although she was not told the murderer's identity, actress Jodie Whittaker was informed that it was not her character a short while before the release of the episode eight script. Whittaker approached Chibnall and said she feared she was the killer. Her concern was so strong, it might have affected her performance, so as filming got under way for episode six Chibnall assured her that she was not the killer. He later admitted it would have been "deceptive" to write the character of Beth Latimer as a powerfully grieving mother, only to have it revealed as a lie. "I couldn't have done that to an actor," he said.

Oskar McNamara (who played Danny Latimer) was the third actor to be told who the murderer was. Danny Latimer's death is very violent, which required telling McNamara about the killer's identity several days in advance so that the actor could prepare and the scene could be choreographed and rehearsed. McNamara's parents worked closely with director Strong to ensure their son's physical and emotional safety. The mother of Adam Wilson (who played Tom Miller) was told the killer's identity several days before the release of the final three scripts. She declined to tell her son who the murderer was. Wilson learned that his on-screen father was the killer just a few minutes before the scene was shot. Wilson's surprise helped him portray the shock Tom Miller felt at his mother's revelation. (Note: The child actors' parents were on the set throughout the series while filming involving their children occurred, in order to help ensure that their children were not emotionally disturbed by the program's dark subject matter.)

After three months of production, the crew and key cast members were given the final three scripts (the last of which revealed the murderer's identity) over a single weekend. One source says that key cast members received all three scripts at once, although Chibnall has been quoted as saying that the script for episode eight was held back until absolutely needed. Even after the final three scripts were distributed, just 29 people—including four cast members—knew the killer's identity while the final episodes were filmed.

Initially, Chibnall wanted to reveal the murderer's identity to the entire cast and crew at an all-hands meeting on the Harbour Cliffs Beach a few days before releasing the final three scripts. A short film of completed footage had been edited together to show the cast and crew how the series was coming together. It was his intent to reveal the secret at the end of the screen. The night before the meeting, the cast and crew filmed the "re-creation scene" where Tom Miller skateboards through Broadchurch in an attempt to jog people's memories. Reaction by the cast was mixed to his decision.

=== Music ===
Broadchurch (Music From the Original Soundtrack)

Soundtrack album by Ólafur Arnalds
- Released: 15 April 2013
- Genres: Soundtrack; Ambient; Electronic
- Length: 20:53
- Label: Mercury Classics

Broadchurch creator Chris Chibnall had long been a fan of Icelandic composer and musician Ólafur Arnalds, (Note: This is an Icelandic name. The last name is a family name, but this person is referred to by the given name Ólafur.) and owned all of Ólafur's albums. While writing Broadchurch, Chibnall listened constantly to Ólafur's music. He later told Ólafur that the "entire feel of the show was inspired by" Ólafur's music.

In late 2012, Chibnall contacted Ólafur to ask him to compose the music for Broadchurch. "The music is a narrative all of its own," Chibnall later said. "I'd heard Ólafur's music and it just broke my heart. I instinctively felt if we could get him, that would be amazing." Ólafur agreed to join the production, and his hiring was publicly announced in December 2012. Ólafur called working on Broadchurch series one "an absolute pleasure. The creators and directors gave me complete artistic freedom and encouraged me to be as bold as possible. Which is what every artist wants to hear."

To compose the music for Broadchurch, Ólafur read the show's scripts to put himself in the right mood. He also researched sounds which might be heard in Dorset as a means of inspiration. As with most of his music, he then improvised at the piano. He composed several themes, some for the series as a whole and some for specific characters. He then shared them with Chibnall, and together they picked out the themes they liked best. Using synthesizers or electronic sound generators, Ólafur also composed sounds to be heard when action occurred in certain spaces, such as the cliffs. Once he saw the completed footage for the first episode, he rearranged some themes to fit the imagery, and composed several new themes as well. Because there was so little time between his being hired and the air date, Ólafur composed very quickly and spent extraordinarily long days at work. He had just four months to generate about 30 minutes of sound and music for each episode, spending one-and-a-half to two weeks on each episode. Despite the time crunch, Ólafur credited Chibnall's relaxed attitude as the key to the music's success.

Through dark and light I fight to be, so close, shadows and lies mask you from me
Bathe my skin the darkness within, so close, the war of our lives no one can win
The missing piece I yearn to find, so close, please clear the anguish from my mind
So close
But when the truth of you comes clear, so close, I wish my life I'd never come near
So close

— Partial lyrics to "So Close", which contain clues to the identity of Danny Latimer's murderer

The music for Broadchurch deliberately avoided a typical orchestral score. Ólafur felt that an orchestra sounded too large and perfect. Music which was intimate and depicted the flawed lives of the characters was needed, so the score was written for a string quartet and piano, accompanied by electronic sound. Recording, which took just five days, was done in an empty church in Reykjavík.

The musical soundtrack to Broadchurch series one includes four songs: "So Close" (the only song to include lyrics), "Suspects", "Arcade", and "Broken". "So Close" plays at the end episodes one through seven. Ólafur collaborated on "So Close" with singer Arnór Dan of the Icelandic band Agent Fresco (with whom Ólafur had worked on his third studio album, For Now I Am Winter, released in February 2013). Arnór wrote the vocal melody, while Ólafur wrote the rest of the music. Chris Chibnall contributed the lyrics, which hold clues to the killer's identity.

Ólafur Arnalds won a British Academy Television (BAFTA) Craft Award for Original Television Music in April 2014. It was his first composition for television. Ólafur's music was widely praised. Mike Hale, writing in The New York Times, called it "a tasty icing of gloom and foreboding", and noted that the show leaned very heavily on the mood that the music created. Cast members were equally as impressed with the music. Actress Jodie Whittaker has said that "hearing the music by Ólafur Arnalds just broke me every time." Actor Andrew Buchan was equally effusive. "The power of music can draw people in more than they realise. I had never heard a piece of music like it. They deliberately went left-field with Ólafur Arnalds. I found it haunting, beautiful and desolate. It can make or break a show. If you think about your reasons for watching The Killing, the music that swells at the end draws you into watching another one. Same with Broadchurch — the music can't be ignored."

The Broadchurch (Music From the Original Soundtrack) extended play album was released on 15 April 2013 by Mercury Classics, a division of Decca Records. It contained six tracks:

1. "Main Theme" – Ólafur Arnalds
2. "So Close (feat. Arnór Dan)" – music by Ólafur Arnalds and Arnór Dan, lyrics by Chris Chibnall
3. "Suspects" – Ólafur Arnalds
4. "Arcade" – Ólafur Arnalds
5. "Broken" – Ólafur Arnalds
6. "Beth's Theme" – Ólafur Arnalds

=== Post-production ===
Visual post-production on Broadchurch series one was handled by the firm Deluxe 142.

The newly founded company Sonorous provided audio post-production. Broadchurch was its first television project. Sonorous' Howard Bargroff was involved in the post-production process even before the first episode had been fully edited. Bargroff held meeting with the producers and post-production as every episode neared completion, and they jointly identified elements of the sound which were in good shape, and those which needed work. Sound mixing was done using PMC Ltd.'s TB2 speakers. The company delivered streaming QuickTime files to the producers to keep them up to date with mix changes. To maintain secrecy, actors had to loop dialogue without seeing the accompanying footage. This prevented workers at the audio post-production facility from seeing any critical visual information and leaking it to the press.

== Reception ==
=== Critical reception ===
Series one of Broadchurch won near-universal praise. Radio Times named it the best television series of 2013, Matthew Bell of the industry journal Television called it "a cultural phenomenon", and Entertainment Weekly and the Nottingham Post called it a "national obsession" in the U.K. A typical critical assessment was made by Tirdad Derekhshani in The Philadelphia Inquirer: "British TV writer Chris Chibnall achieved something special with the ITV show Broadchurch: It's a tense, gripping murder mystery, for sure, but the eight-episode series that was shown on BBC America in August also is a brilliantly plotted, multilayered, intimate character study...[f]eaturing a brilliant ensemble cast..."

Not all reviews were rhapsodic. Mike Hale in The New York Times, noted, "It's a pre-eminent example of what could be called the new International Style in television drama: a moody, slow-moving, complicated crime story with damaged heroes and not much redemption to go around." He found the characters "typical", and the show largely redeemed by the superb acting rather than any insightful writing or plotting. Although he praised Broadchurch's music, cinematography, and editing, he also pointed out that they were highly derivative of the 2007–2012 Danish murder-mystery Forbrydelsen and its 2011–2014 American remake The Killing. Some reviews were even harsher. John Byrne at RTÉ called Broadchurch downright boring.

Broadchurch series one also received a record-setting number of tweets on Twitter. Series one received a total of 470,000 tweets during its run, the largest number of tweets for an ITV program since Twitter began keeping records. About 260,000 tweets were sent while the final episode aired, with a peak of 8,942 tweets per minute.

=== Ratings ===
Broadchurch series one was the highest-rated drama on British television in 2013.

The first episode of Broadchurch series one was seen by an average of 9.1 million viewers (31 percent audience share). This included 6.15 million live viewers (25.2 percent audience share), with another 716,000 viewers (4.4 percent) on time-delayed viewing via digital video recorder, timeshifted channels (+1), and similar media and technologies. It won its time-slot beating Mayday and Embarrassing Bodies. This was the best premiere episode of a weekday new drama series in the United Kingdom since ITV's Whitechapel debuted in January 2009.

The second episode continued to perform well pulling in 5.78 million viewers (23.2 percent audience share), while another 606,000 viewers (3.7 percent) watching on time-delayed viewing. It once again won its competitive time slot beating Embarrassing Bodies and BBC One's Shetland. The third episode climbed to its biggest audience so far pulling in 7.30 million viewers (30.9 percent audience share), adding 241,000 (1.1 percent) via time-delayed viewing. Once again it won its time slot. The fourth episode continued to draw a large audience, pulling in 6.88 million viewers (28.1 percent audience share), and further 308,000 viewers (1.79%) watching on time-delay. The fifth episode climbed in the ratings from the previous week to help give ITV a win over BBC One, overnight data revealed. The fifth episode attracted 6.29 million viewers (24.5 percent audience share) at 9 PM. A further 310,000 viewers tuned in via time-delay viewing. The sixth episode climbed once again in the ratings, overnight data revealed. Live viewers rose to 6.29 million (24.5 percent audience share) with 310,000 viewers tuning in via time-delay. The penultimate episode won an audience of 6.93 million (27.7 percent audience share) on ITV, with 342,000 (1.9 percent) tuning in on ITV+1.

Broadchurch attracted an average weekly audience of 7.1 million "live" viewers during its run. After accounting for time-delayed viewing, Broadchurch averaged 9.2 million viewers per episode.

Broadchurch series one was not a rating success in all countries, however. When it aired on BBC America in the United States, ratings were negligible. American consumption of the series on iTunes, Amazon.com, and other streaming video sites was also small.

Summary of episode ratings
Episode	Date	Official ITV rating (millions)	Weekly rank ^1	Share (%)	Official ITV HD rating (millions)	Official ITV +1 rating (millions)	Total ITV viewers (millions)
Episode 1	4 March 2013	7.43	6	25.2	0.73	0.91	9.07
Episode 2	11 March 2013	7.38	6	23.2	0.70	0.92	9.01
Episode 3	18 March 2013	8.29	5	30.9	0.94	0.42	9.65
Episode 4	25 March 2013	8.03	8	22.3	0.88	0.50	9.42
Episode 5	1 April 2013	7.38	6	24.5	0.91	0.52	8.81
Episode 6	8 April 2013	7.58	7	27.7	0.85	0.52	8.95
Episode 7	15 April 2013	7.84	6	28.9	1.17	0.55	9.56
Episode 8	22 April 2013	8.63	3	34.2	1.26	0.58	10.47
Series average	2013	7.82	6	27.1	0.93	0.62	9.37

== Awards ==
Broadchurch was nominated for seven BAFTA awards. Olivia Colman won Best Actress, David Bradley won Best Supporting Actor, and the show won Best Drama Series. The show competed for the BAFTA Audience Award, but lost to "The Day of the Doctor" (Doctor Who), which also starred David Tennant. Ólafur Arnalds won Best Original Television Music, while James Strong was nominated for Best Director-Fiction for "Episode One", Mike Jones was nominated for Best Editing-Fiction for "Episode Eight", Catrin Meredydd was nominated for Best Production Design, and Chris Chibnall was nominated for Best Writer-Drama.

Award	Category	Nominee(s)	Result
Freesat Awards	Best British TV Programme or Series	Broadchurch	Won
TV Choice Awards	Best New Drama	Broadchurch	Won
TV Choice Awards	Best Actor	David Tennant	Won
TV Choice Awards	Best Actress	Olivia Colman	Nominated
Satellite Awards	Actress In A Drama Series	Olivia Colman	Nominated
National TV Awards	Drama	Broadchurch	Nominated
National TV Awards	Radio Times TV Detective	David Tennant	Nominated
National TV Awards	Radio Times TV Detective	Olivia Colman	Nominated
South Bank Sky Arts Award	TV Drama	Broadchurch	Won
Broadcast Awards	Best Drama Series or Serial	Broadchurch	Won
Broadcast Awards	International Programme Sales	Broadchurch	Won
Broadcasting Press Guild Television and Radio Awards	Best Drama Series	Broadchurch	Won
Broadcasting Press Guild Television and Radio Awards	Best Writer	Chris Chibnall	Won
Broadcasting Press Guild Television and Radio Awards	Best Actor	David Tennant	Nominated
Broadcasting Press Guild Television and Radio Awards	Best Actress	Olivia Colman	Won
Royal Television Society Awards	Drama Serial	Broadchurch	Won
Royal Television Society Awards	Writer — Drama	Chris Chibnall	Nominated
Royal Television Society Awards	Actor — Female	Olivia Colman	Won
TRIC Awards	Crime Programme of the Year	Broadchurch	Won
BAFTA Craft Awards	Director—Fiction/Entertainment	James Strong	Nominated
BAFTA Craft Awards	Writer—Drama	Chris Chibnall	Nominated
BAFTA Craft Awards	Editing—Fiction	Mike Jones	Nominated
BAFTA Craft Awards	Original Television Music	Ólafur Arnalds	Won
BAFTA Craft Awards	Production Design	Catrin Meredydd	Nominated
Peabody Award	Area of Excellence	Broadchurch	Won
2014 Televisual Bulldog Awards	Drama Serial	Broadchurch	Won
2014 Televisual Bulldog Awards	Best in Show	Broadchurch	Won
2014 Televisual Bulldog Awards	Music	Broadchurch	Won
2014 Televisual Bulldog Awards	Cinematography	Broadchurch	Nominated
2014 British Academy Television Awards	Drama Series	Broadchurch	Won
2014 British Academy Television Awards	Leading Actress	Olivia Colman	Won
2014 British Academy Television Awards	Supporting Actor	David Bradley	Won
2014 British Academy Television Awards	Radio Times Audience Award	Broadchurch	Nominated
2014 TCA Awards	Outstanding Achievement in Movies, Miniseries and Specials	Broadchurch	Nominated

== Home media releases ==
Broadchurch series one subsequently aired in more than 135 countries. These include Australia, Brazil, Canada, China, France, Germany, the Netherlands, the United States, and a number of African nations.

The first series of Broadchurch was released on DVD in the United Kingdom by Acorn Media UK on 20 May 2013. Subsequently, a Special Edition Blu-ray, containing audio commentaries and deleted scenes in addition to the special features found on the DVD, was released in the UK on 4 November 2013.

The series was released on DVD in the United States on 1 April 2014 by Entertainment One.

== Bibliography ==
- ITV (6 February 2013). "Broadchurch: A new drama for ITV" (PDF). Archived from the original (PDF) on 4 March 2016.
- Millerson, Gerald; Owens, Jim (2012). Television Production. New York: CRC Press. ISBN 9781136038907.
- West Dorset District Council (2013). The Official Broadchurch Guide (PDF) (Report). Archived from the original (PDF) on 29 November 2014.
