= The Angels Take Manhattan =

230 – "The Angels Take Manhattan"
- Doctor Who episode
- Promotional poster

Cast
- Doctor: Matt Smith – Eleventh Doctor
- Companions: Karen Gillan – Amy Pond; Arthur Darvill – Rory Williams
- Others: Alex Kingston – River Song; Mike McShane – Grayle; Rob David – Sam Garner; Ozzie Yue – Foreman; Bentley Kalu – Hood; Burnell Tucker – Old Garner

Production
- Directed by: Nick Hurran
- Written by: Steven Moffat
- Produced by: Marcus Wilson
- Executive producers: Steven Moffat; Caroline Skinner
- Music by: Murray Gold
- Series: Series 7
- Running time: 45 minutes
- First broadcast: 29 September 2012

Chronology
← Preceded by "The Power of Three"	Followed by → "The Snowmen"

"The Angels Take Manhattan" is the fifth episode of the seventh series of the British science fiction television series Doctor Who, which was first broadcast on BBC One on 29 September 2012. It is the last in the first block of episodes in the seventh series, followed by the 2012 Christmas special "The Snowmen". The episode was written by head writer Steven Moffat and directed by Nick Hurran.

In the episode, alien time traveller the Doctor (Matt Smith) takes his companions Amy Pond (Karen Gillan) and her husband Rory Williams (Arthur Darvill) to Central Park. While Rory goes to get coffee, recurring monsters, the Weeping Angels, send Rory back to 1938, where he is reunited with River Song (Alex Kingston), Amy and Rory's daughter. Amy and the Doctor attempt to rescue Rory, but the Doctor realises along the way that this adventure will be his last with Amy and Rory. Actors Gillan and Darvill both departed the series during this episode.

Amy's departure from the series was a compromise between Gillan and Moffat. Moffat wrote several endings and situations for the couple, eventually deciding to incorporate the Weeping Angels. Despite being Amy and Rory's last episode, it was not the last episode Gillan and Darvill filmed. Production took place in April 2012, with location filming in Wales and a small crew filming in the United States in Central Park. "The Angels Take Manhattan" was watched by 7.82 million viewers in the UK and received positive reviews, though critics noted some plot holes and other logical issues.

== Plot ==
In 2012, the Eleventh Doctor, Amy, and Rory enjoy a picnic in Central Park. The Doctor reads a novel about a 1930s detective named Melody Malone. Rory is sent to 1938 by a cherub Weeping Angel and meets River Song, who wrote Melody Malone. The Doctor and Amy find Rory written into the Melody Malone novel and attempt to take the TARDIS to 1938, but the TARDIS struggles to get there.

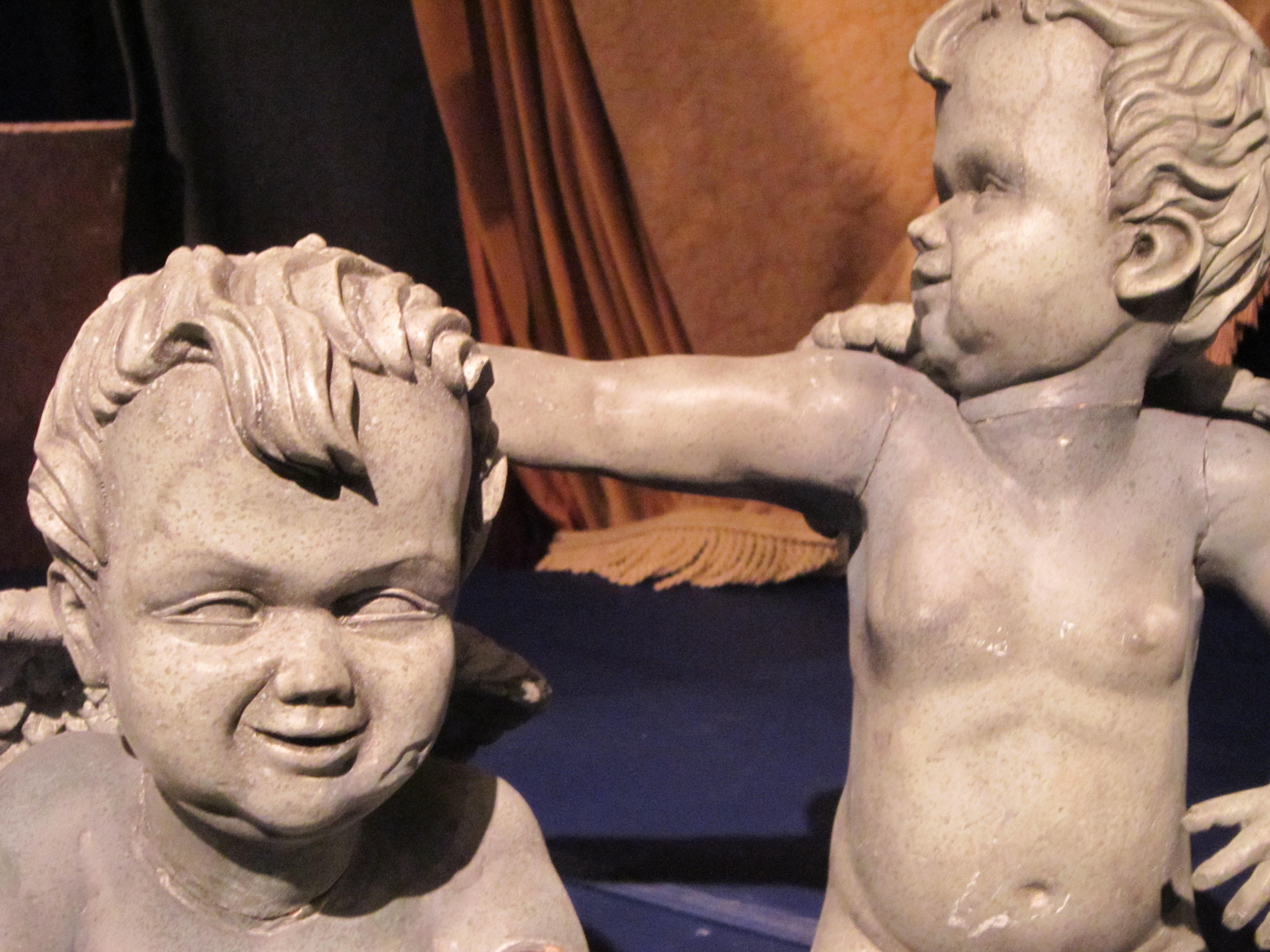
Cherub angels as they appear at the Doctor Who Experience.

The Weeping Angel collector Grayle captures River and Rory. He locks Rory in the cellar with several cherub Weeping Angels, while he has a Weeping Angel grab River by the wrist while he interrogates her. River is able to use her vortex manipulator to allow the TARDIS to arrive. Amy, knowing River wrote the book to help them, uses it to look for Rory. River breaks her wrist to free herself. Amy finds the cellar empty and the Doctor locates Rory at an apartment building nearby.

Rory enters an apartment with an elderly version of himself in bed, who dies without having seen Amy for many years. The Doctor deduces that the Weeping Angels have been using the building as a battery farm, sending the victims to their past while feeding off their time energy. Rory and Amy refuse to accept their fate and flee to the roof. Amy and Rory jump off the roof, creating a paradox that destroys the building and the Weeping Angels.

The Doctor, River, Amy and Rory find themselves near the TARDIS in a graveyard in 2012. Rory catches sight of a gravestone with his name on it. He is then sent into the past by a Weeping Angel who had survived the paradox. The Doctor is unable to go back to get him, due to the paradox. Despite the Doctor urging her not to do so, Amy, desperate to be with Rory, allows herself to be touched by the Weeping Angel. Amy's married name then appears on the gravestone.

River declines to travel full-time with the Doctor, but insists he should not travel alone, and promises to ask Amy to write an afterword in the novel for him. The Doctor recovers the last page of the book he had torn out earlier, where Amy wrote to him, encouraging him to not travel alone. As a final request from Amy, the Doctor goes back to her garden in 1996, the morning after young Amelia Pond had waited for him, to tell her about her future adventures.

=== Continuity ===
Images from "The Eleventh Hour" of a young Amelia Pond going to the garden and awaiting the Doctor are shown at the episode's conclusion.

== Production ==
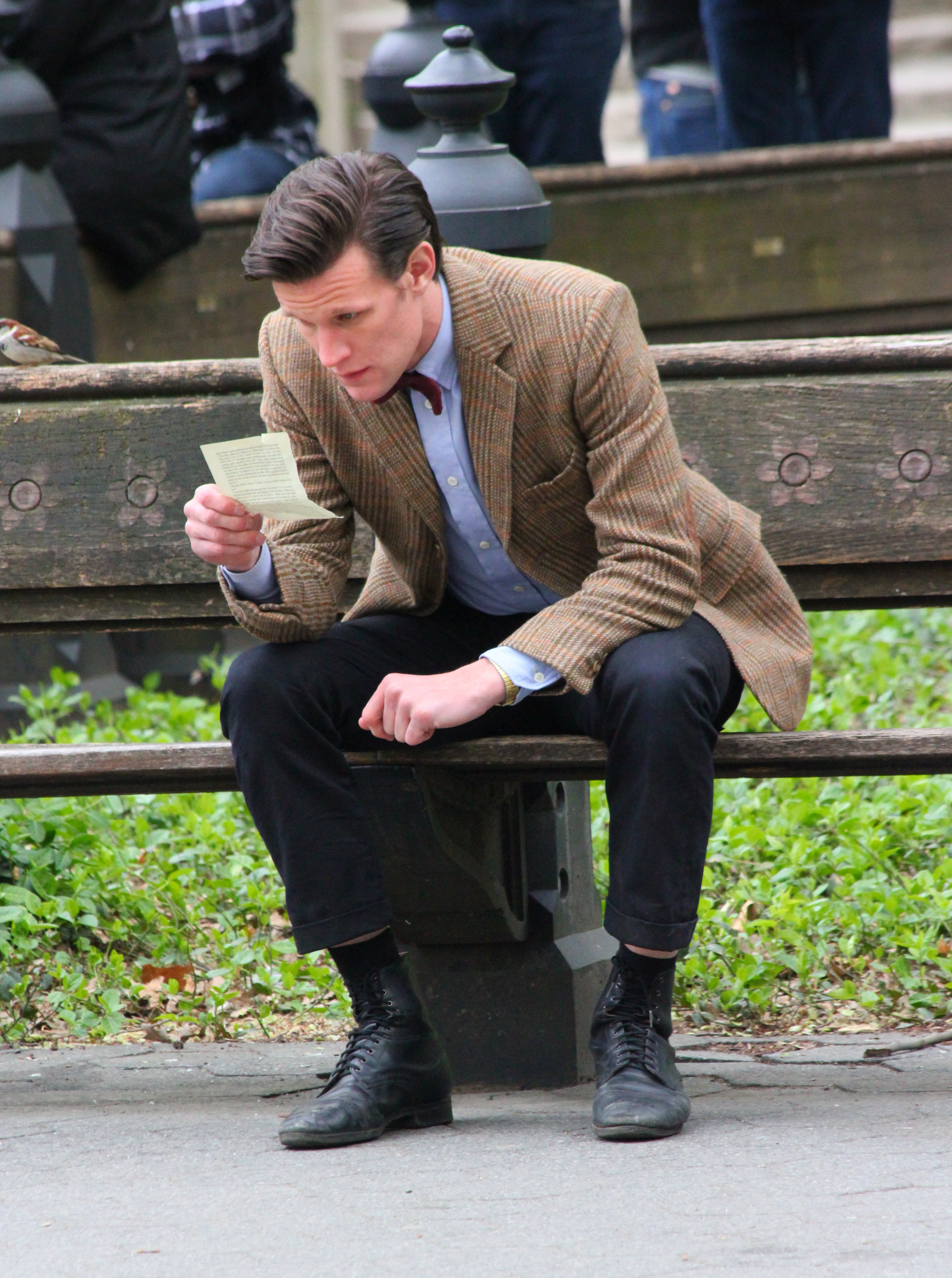
Matt Smith during filming of the episode in Central Park, New York, part of the final scene where the Doctor reads Amy Pond's afterword.

In December 2011, Doctor Who showrunner Steven Moffat announced that Amy and Rory would leave in the seventh series in "heartbreaking" circumstances. Amy's exit was a mutual decision between Moffat and Amy's actor Karen Gillan. Gillan stated that she wanted to go "on a high when the character was at her prime" and to "go with everything that she wants". She wanted her character to have a final ending, and ruled out returning to the show in the future as she felt it would take away from the impact of her final scene. Moffat stated he felt "tremendous pressure" writing Amy and Rory's ending. He later revealed that he "completely changed" the ending as he was writing it, feeling the emphasis was wrong. During rewrites Moffat went back and forth deciding whether or not Amy and Rory should live or die. He eventually decided that death would complement the storyline involving the "old, sentimental" and "dangerous" characterisation of the Doctor. At one point he considered making the story that involved the Daleks, but felt the Weeping Angels were a "better fit". Moffat was also interested in coming up with a new form for the Angels, and so he introduced the cherubs. He also said that since the Angels had debuted in "Blink", fans had suggested that the Statue of Liberty could be a Weeping Angel.

Gillan refused to read the script for a few weeks after she received it because she "didn't want to make it real". She said in an interview, "I literally couldn't read it without crying. It was the most highly-charged read-through I've ever experienced. But I couldn't have asked for a better exit. I don't think it'll be what people expect." A scene written by Chris Chibnall showing how Rory's father Brian (Mark Williams) became aware of Amy and Rory's fate did not make it into production. However, on 12 October 2012, the BBC released an animated storyboard entitled "P.S." that depicted the scene with narration by Arthur Darvill. It takes place one week later in Brian's timeline after "The Power of Three" when a man named Anthony delivers him a letter from Rory, telling him that they will never return and that Anthony is the son they adopted in 1946. The scene was written to be a DVD extra, and was not filmed due to time constraints.

The read-through for "The Angels Take Manhattan" took place in the Upper Boat Studios on 23 March 2012, alongside that for the episode "Asylum of the Daleks". The final episode Gillan and Darvill shot as Amy and Rory was actually the previous episode, "The Power of Three". Nevertheless, Gillan and Matt Smith got very emotional filming the final graveyard scene. Amy and Rory's scene on the rooftop was filmed in a car park in Cardiff, with a greenscreen standing in for the New York skyline. To create the effect of the two plunging down, Gillan and Darvill were suspended upside-down by wires and raised and lowered. Much of the episode was filmed in Central Park in New York City in April 2012. The filming was attended by thousands of American fans, which surprised the cast and crew. Other scenes were shot at night in the city, as well as by the East River in front of the Brooklyn Bridge and in the Tudor City apartment complex. Moffat was in New York City when he came up with the story, and thought it was appropriate for the Weeping Angels. He described the city as "a different backdrop" to shoot a Doctor Who story in, and made use of its architecture. Fellow executive producer Caroline Skinner felt that the location "has such scale and romance" which "[gave] the episode a real atmosphere and a very different tone for Doctor Who". The week spent filming in the city was done by a "small unit by American standards" according to producer Marcus Wilson. They did not take any props of Angels or the TARDIS, which were instead added in post-production. Filming for the episode also occurred at a cemetery in Llanelli. During post-production, the New York skyline was inserted into the cemetery scenes. Gillan insisted on reading Amy's afterword in the Melody Malone book to Smith when his reaction was filmed. They were not expecting it to be in front of a crowd in Central Park, and Smith said he had to "treat this like a play". Because the content was so secret, Gillan had to read very quietly and Smith could not hold the real page because a spectator might take a picture of it. Gillan found that she only had one page of the script, and had to improvise the rest.

The Doctor Who logo in the title sequence featured a texture showing the Statue of Liberty's crown, in keeping with the varied "blockbuster" themes for each of the opening five episodes of the series. The beginning of the episode features the song "Englishman in New York" by Sting. On 4 October 2012, BBC Books released the ebook The Angel's Kiss: A Melody Malone Mystery, a prequel to the story that the Doctor was reading in the episode.

== Broadcast and reception ==
"The Angels Take Manhattan" was first broadcast in the United Kingdom on 29 September 2012 on BBC One, and on the same date in the United States on BBC America. Overnight ratings showed that it was watched by 5.9 million viewers live, an increase of 400,000 from the previous week. The final consolidated rating rose to 7.82 million viewers, making it the thirteenth most-watched programme of the week on British television. The episode also received 0.92 million requests on BBC's online iPlayer, placing it seventh for the month on the site despite only being available for a few days. It also received an Appreciation Index of 88, the second highest of the series behind "Asylum of the Daleks" (89).

=== Critical reception ===
Professional ratings
Review scores
Source	Rating
Digital Spy	5/5 stars
IGN	9/10
Radio Times	5/5 stars
SFX	4/5 stars
The A.V. Club	A
The Telegraph	5/5 stars
TV Fanatic	4/5 stars

The episode received positive reviews. Dan Martin of The Guardian gave a positive review, writing, "This was a fitting end to a golden era, and bravo to Steven Moffat for telling such an involving, emotional story with such style". He also praised the concept of the cherubs and the Angels in New York. However, he noted that he was "flummoxed" as to where in River's timeline the episode took place. The Daily Telegraph reviewer Gavin Fuller gave it five out of five stars, concluding "'The Angels Take Manhattan' brought this mini-run of the series to a close with easily the best episode of the five: a powerful, taut, compelling, filmic, emotionally punchy affair which re-established the Angels as one of the standout monsters of the series and gave Amy Pond a fine send off". While he praised the four actors he felt Gillan was the star, and noted that Rory did not "get any sort of send-off". Keith Phipps of The A.V. Club gave "The Angels Take Manhattan" a grade of A, attributing its success to "the way it does double duty as a twist adventure and a highly emotional story of farewells".

Sam Wollaston, also writing for The Guardian, wrote positively of the scare factor in the episode, as well as the sadness. Neela Debnath of The Independent described it as a "wonderful swansong to the duo" and particularly praised the "stylish" cinematography and sense of danger. However, she considered the "only flaw" to be "the rule that time cannot be changed if one knows what is going to happen ... though it is probably best not to question the timey wimey side of things and just accept it and enjoy the adventure". IGN's Matt Risley rated the episode 9 out of 10, writing that it "stood strong as a heartfelt, emotional end for the TARDIS' longest serving companions (since the show's noughties' return at least), and the best episode of the season thus far". Risley also praised the three leads, though he said that the episode "left a few nitpicky questions".

Digital Spy reviewer Morgan Jeffery gave "The Angels Take Manhattan" five out of five stars, despite noting "plotholes ... and slightly-too-convenient plot contrivances" and that Rory did not get a heroic exit. Jeffery particularly praised the build-up to Amy and Rory's departure as well as the "superb production design". Dave Golder of SFX awarded the episode four out of five stars, believing that the "bittersweet exit" of the Ponds distracted the viewer from various narrative problems, such as the Statue of Liberty. He felt that Gillan and Darvill "were on top form" as well as Smith's "brilliant performance" and a "less over-the-top River", and also wrote positively about the noir theme and the Angels using the Winter Quay apartment building as a battery farm. The Huffington Post writer Maureen Ryan was more critical of the episode, worrying that the BBC's international promotion of the show was to the detriment of the quality of the writing. She felt that Amy deserved a better exit and "was crowded out by the distracting presence of River Song and by the fact that Rory was the one to make the essential choices first". She also personally disliked the "timey-wimey" devices, and commented that the "big and operatic tone the director was clearly going for clashed with the mood of film noir" and that the Angels "felt less menacing" and the "pace was a little too frantic".

The episode was nominated for the 2013 Hugo Award for Best Dramatic Presentation (Short Form), alongside "Asylum of the Daleks" and "The Snowmen".
