= The Angel's Kiss: A Melody Malone Mystery =

2012 novel by Justin Richards

- The cover of The Angel's Kiss: A Melody Malone Mystery
- Author: Justin Richards as "Melody Malone"
- Language: English
- Series: Doctor Who
- Publisher: BBC Books
- Publication date: 4 October 2012
- Media type: ebook

The Angel's Kiss: A Melody Malone Mystery is a 2012 science fiction/mystery novella by Justin Richards, writing as Melody Malone, which is in turn a pseudonym for River Song, a fictional character from the UK TV series Doctor Who.

The novella is an expansion of a book featured within the narrative of the 2012 Doctor Who episode The Angels Take Manhattan in which it refers to events taking place just prior to the episode, and events within. The character of Eleventh Doctor is shown reading the book, which is said to have been written by the character of River Song (a human-Time Lord hybrid who at this point in the show's narrative is married to the Doctor and is in fact the daughter of his companions Amy Pond and Rory Williams) under the pseudonym of "Melody Malone".

The novella was initially released in e-book format on 4 October 2012. An audiobook version was released on CD by AudioGO on 16 April 2013, narrated by actress Alex Kingston who portrays River Song in Doctor Who. A physical print release of the story occurred in the October 2013 anthology collection Summer Falls and Other Stories.

== Summary ==
The story follows titular character Melody Malone, a detective that has been hired by film star Rock Railton. Railton believes that he is to be killed and makes mention to the "kiss of the Angel", which piques Malone's curiosity enough to take the case. Melody is further drawn into the mystery when studio owner Max Kliener notices her at a press party and insists on making her into a star. Soon Melody discovers that Kliener's intents are not entirely honest and that she must find a way to escape what he has in store for her before it is too late.
