= P.S. (Doctor Who) =

- Doctor Who episode
- Brian Williams reading Rory's letter on a couch

Cast
- Companions: Arthur Darvill (Rory Williams)
- Others: Matt Smith – Eleventh Doctor (archive footage); Karen Gillan – Amy Pond (archive footage); Mark Williams – Brian Williams (archive footage)

Production
- Written by: Chris Chibnall
- Series: Series 7
- Running time: 5 minutes

Chronology
← Preceded by "The Angels Take Manhattan"	Followed by → "The Snowmen"

"P.S." is a mini episode of the seventh series of Doctor Who, written by Chris Chibnall. Set after the departure of Amy Pond and Rory Williams in "The Angels Take Manhattan", it depicts a letter that Rory sent to his father Brian explaining why he and Amy are not returning. This episode was dubbed "the scene that was never shot", as it was released in complete storyboard drawings.

== Synopsis ==
The final scene from "The Power of Three" is shown, before the titles.

Afterwards, in complete drawing format, Brian is shown watering the plants, when there is a knock at the door. A man, Anthony, from New York, hands Brian a letter. Anthony tells Brian that he'll wait indoors until he has read it.

Brian sits down and reads the letter, which is from his son Rory. It explains that Brian will never be able to see him or Amy again, and he apologises. Rory also explains that the person who delivered the letter is Brian's grandson, Anthony Brian Williams, whom Amy and Rory adopted in 1946.

After Brian reads the letter, he walks out to Anthony, who offers a handshake. The two then embrace in a hug as the episode closes.

== Production ==
In an interview with Den of Geek Chibnall stated that shortly after he completed "Dinosaurs on a Spaceship" Steven Moffat, then head writer, "knew how the Weeping Angels episode was going to end" and that they "knew that Brian would come back in "The Power of Three". Chibnall quoted Moffat saying "I feel terrible, because I really want to finish off what happens to Brian but it just will not fit in ["The Angels Take Manhattan"] and it would feel really odd to put him in that", at which point Chibnall said to him, "Look, I'll write a scene for the DVD." Chibnall stated that he wrote "P.S." around the same time of writing the series seven five-part mini-prequel Pond Life.

=== Filming ===
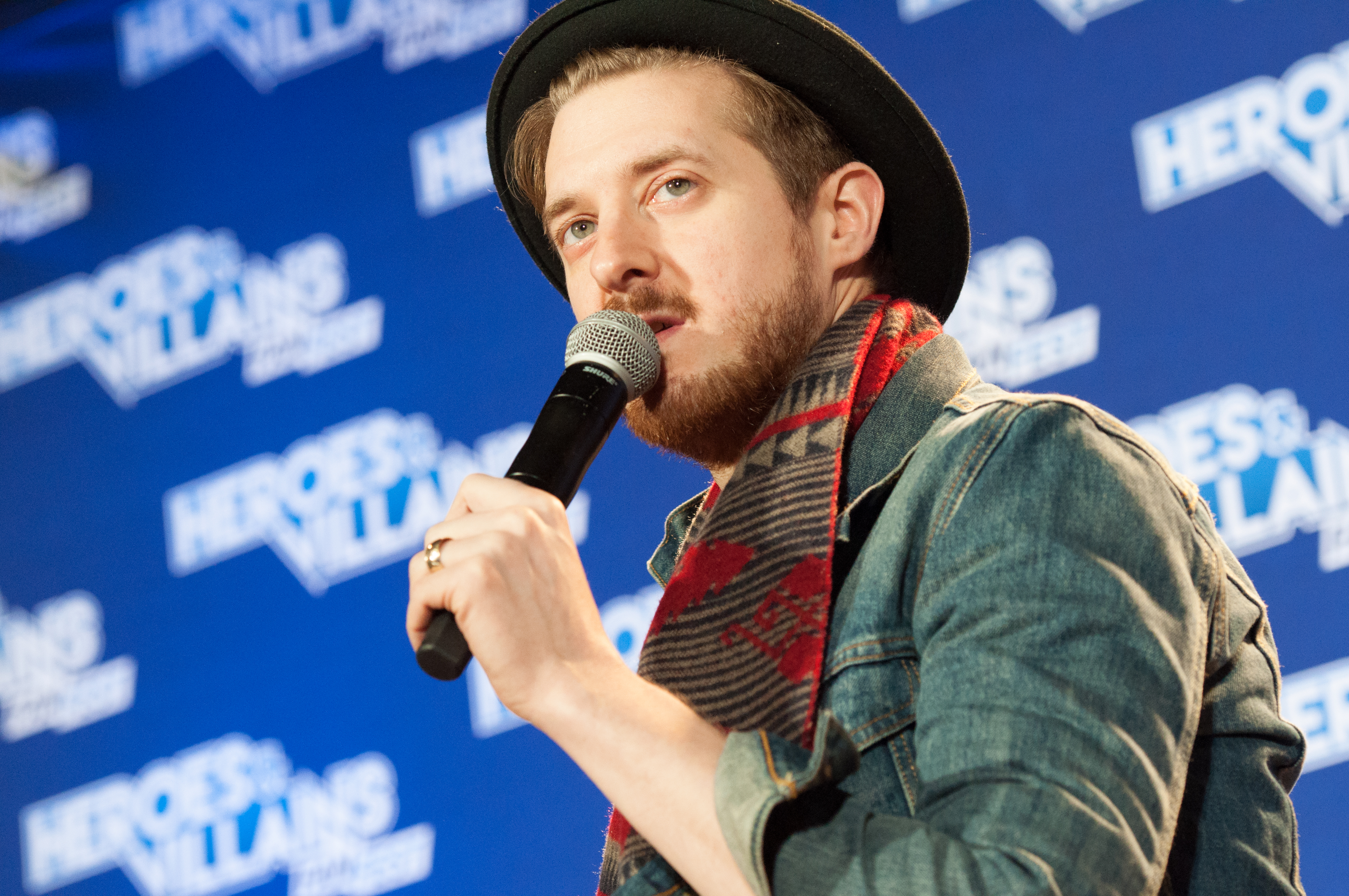
Arthur Darvill narrated the minisode.

After watching Mark Williams portray Brian in "Dinosaurs on a Spaceship", the crew felt as though he was a very good actor, and how important he would be in "The Power of Three". However, at the time, Mark Williams was filming Blandings in Northern Ireland, and therefore unavailable to film "P.S.". Later on, as the series was beginning to air, Chibnall wondered whether or not the crew would actually do anything with the scene that he had written, before finding out at a later date that they had turned it into an animation.

While the opening was archive footage from "The Power of Three", the rest of episode was entirely realised in animated storyboards, with simple text depicting the actions and sets. Arthur Darvill recorded his voice-over dialogue in a recording studio.

== Release ==
The episode serves as an epilogue to "The Angels Take Manhattan". After the episodes was broadcast, the BBC received various email from fans asking about what happened to Brian after his son and daughter-in-law's departure. These emails convinced the BBC to release "P.S." as a mini animated storyboard adventure.

=== Reception ===
Writing for IGN Tom Butler felt that the episode was a "fitting (and emotional) send off". Screen Rant's Jessica Smith felt that the episode was a perfect send off for the characters and the show "missed out" by not including it.

Writing for GamesRadar+ Alasdair Stuart had mixed feelings on the episode, commending the emotional theme but also praised and criticised the impression that the Doctor's absence suggests that the Doctor never went back to tell Brian what happened to his son.
