= Chris Chibnall =

English television writer (born 1970)

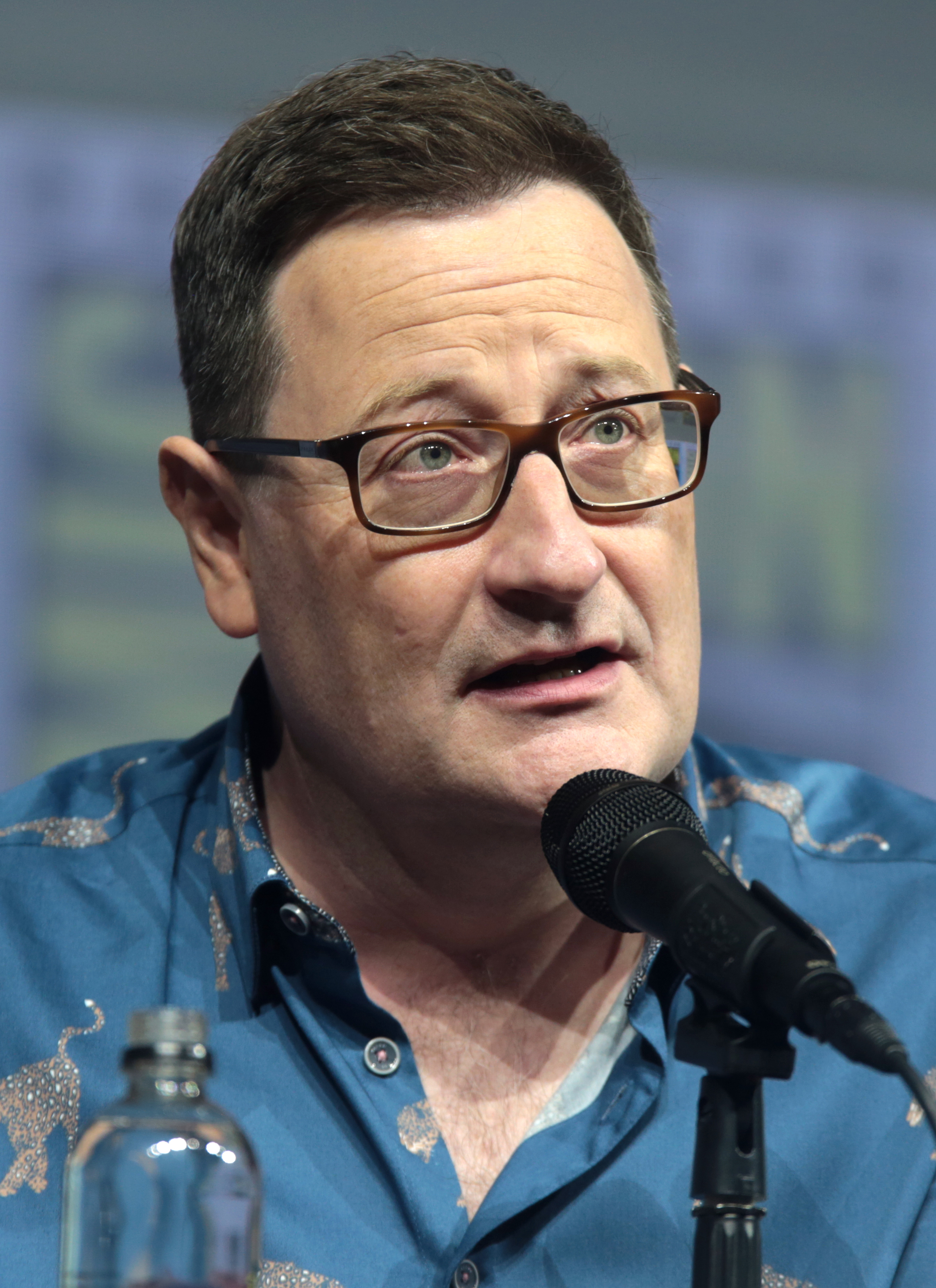
- Chibnall at the 2018 San Diego Comic-Con
- Born: Christopher Antony Chibnall; 21 March 1970 (age 56); England
- Education: St Mary's University, Twickenham (BA); University of Sheffield (MA)
- Occupations: Writer, producer, executive producer
- Years active: 1988–present
- Notable work: Broadchurch; Torchwood; Doctor Who
- Spouse: Madeline Joinson (m. 2002)
- Children: 2

Christopher Antony Chibnall (born 21 March 1970) is an English television writer and producer, best known as the creator and writer of the award-winning ITV mystery-crime drama Broadchurch (2013–17) and as the third showrunner of the 2005 revival of the BBC sci-fi series Doctor Who (2018–22). Chibnall wrote five episodes of the series under previous showrunners Russell T Davies and Steven Moffat, and he was also the head writer for the first two series of the spinoff Torchwood (2006–08).

== Early life and career ==
Chibnall was brought up in Formby, Merseyside. He studied drama at St Mary's University, Twickenham, subsequently gaining an MA in Theatre and Film from the University of Sheffield. His early career included work as a football archivist and floor manager for Sky Sports, before leaving to work as an administrator for various theatre companies. From 1996 to 1999 he worked as administrator with the experimental theatre company Complicité (where he met his wife Madeline), before leaving to become a full-time writer.

== Career ==
=== Theatre writing ===
Chibnall's first short play was produced as part of Contact Theatre's Young Playwright's Festival in 1988, and was directed by Lawrence Till. While studying at college, he wrote two plays, Victims and Now We Are Free, which were performed at the Edinburgh Fringe Festival and directed by Edward Lewis. In 1998, he became Writer in Residence with GRiP Theatre Company, writing three full-length plays, including Best Daze and Gaffer! and several short plays. Chibnall's successor as Writer in Residence was Matthew Broughton. Gaffer! was revived at Southwark Playhouse in 2004.

Chibnall took part in an attachment at the Royal National Theatre Studio in 1999, followed by a year-long attachment to Soho Theatre in 2000, which resulted in his play Kiss Me Like You Mean It, produced at Soho Theatre and directed by Abigail Morris. Its cast included Catherine McCormack, Jason Hughes, Marlene Sidaway and Harry Towb. The play was shortlisted for the Meyer-Whitworth Award, and has subsequently been produced in various venues around the world, including a successful three-month run in Paris in 2004.

In February 2024, Chibnall's play, One Last Push, premiered at Salisbury Playhouse.

=== Television writing ===
Chibnall's first produced script for television was the successful monologue Stormin' Norman, starring James Bolam, made by Carlton Television for ITV.

In 2001 he was approached, together with writer Nigel McCrery, to develop the format for a drama series which became Born and Bred. With a cast including Bolam and Michael French, Born and Bred ran on BBC One for four years from 2002 to 2005. Chibnall served as head writer and consultant producer (later executive producer), writing seventeen of its thirty-six hour-long episodes.

Chibnall was the only writer other than the show's creators to write for both series of the double International Emmy-award-winning BBC One police drama Life on Mars (2006–07). He was part of the production team who accepted the 2007 BAFTA Audience Award onstage at the London Palladium.

During 2005, Chibnall was in charge of developing a proposed fantasy series involving the mythical magician Merlin for BBC One's early Saturday evening family drama slot. Despite several scripts being written, BBC Head of Drama Jane Tranter eventually decided not to green-light the project, although it later emerged, without Chibnall's involvement, as Merlin (2008–2012).

In 2007, Dick Wolf and Kudos Film and Television selected Chibnall to become the show runner on ITV1's Law & Order: UK, a police procedural/legal drama based on the original US series. Chibnall was the lead writer and executive producer, writing six of the first thirteen episodes based on scripts from the US series. ITV commissioned a second run of thirteen episodes, but having set up the series Chibnall made the decision to leave the programme, to focus on other writing projects.

Chibnall also show-ran Camelot, an adult retelling of the Arthurian legend for the Starz network. It went to air early in April 2011 and was filmed in Ardmore Studios near Dublin. The show was cancelled after a single season, though again Chibnall claimed he had chosen not to be involved in the second series in any case, due to other writing priorities.

In December 2013, Chibnall wrote a two-part dramatisation The Great Train Robbery, which tells the story of the Great Train Robbery on 8 August 1963. Coincidentally, the first part was shown on the same day that train robber Ronnie Biggs died.

In 2013, Chibnall created and wrote a detective series for ITV called Broadchurch, starring David Tennant, Olivia Colman, Jodie Whittaker, Andrew Buchan, Arthur Darvill, Pauline Quirke and David Bradley. The series received overwhelmingly positive reviews from critics and audiences alike. It followed the story of the fictional seaside town of Broadchurch, struggling to come to terms with the possible murder of a young boy. Viewing figures peaked at nearly 9 million viewers in the finale. After a successful first series, a second was announced at the end of the first series, with location filming finishing in October 2014. The second series aired in 2015 and a third and final series aired in 2017.

==== Doctor Who ====
Chibnall is a long-time fan of Doctor Who, and appeared on the BBC discussion programme Open Air in 1986 as a member of the Liverpool local group of the Doctor Who Appreciation Society, criticising The Trial of a Time Lord (1986), especially the Terror of the Vervoids segment.

In 2005, Chibnall was appointed head writer and co-producer of science-fiction drama Torchwood. The series, a spin-off from Doctor Who, premiered on BBC Three in October 2006 to a then record-breaking audience for a non-sport programme digital channel broadcast in the UK. The programme went on to win "Best New Drama" at the 2007 TV Quick Awards and "Best Drama Series" at the BAFTA Cymru 2007 awards. The series has also been nominated for both Hugo and Saturn awards. In the US, the programme has been broadcast on BBC America and HDNet, to critical acclaim. Chibnall wrote eight episodes during the first two series, including both series' finales, and the premiere episode of series two. He worked closely with Russell T Davies across all aspects of the show's production.

While working on Torchwood, Chibnall also wrote the 2007 episode "42" for the third series of Doctor Who. He returned for the 2010 series, penning the two-part story "The Hungry Earth" / "Cold Blood", which reintroduced the Silurians to the series. Chibnall also wrote the second and fourth episodes for the seventh series in 2012, "Dinosaurs on a Spaceship" and "The Power of Three", as well as the online/red button exclusive Pond Life. He also penned another short, P.S., but it was never filmed, and was eventually presented online in storyboard format.

In January 2016, the BBC announced that Chibnall would replace Steven Moffat as executive producer of Doctor Who and would be the head writer and executive producer, starting with the eleventh series of the revived era. Matt Strevens joined Chibnall as co-executive producer, after having also been an executive producer on An Adventure in Space and Time. When discussing whether the next Doctor would be a woman, he stated in February 2017 "Nothing is ruled out but I don't want the casting to be a gimmick and that's all I can say”. After Jodie Whittaker was announced as the Thirteenth Doctor in July 2017, Chibnall said, "I always knew I wanted the Thirteenth Doctor to be a woman and we’re thrilled to have secured our number one choice."

As with the last change of showrunners, Chibnall wrote the final moments of Moffat's last episode "Twice Upon a Time", so as to allow him to write Whittaker's first lines on the show. This previously happened in the 2010 special "The End of Time", when Moffat took over for Russell T. Davies in the final moments of the episode, writing Matt Smith's first words as the Eleventh Doctor.

On 29 July 2021, the BBC announced that Chibnall would be stepping down from his role as the showrunner of Doctor Who, and Whittaker would be leaving her role as the Thirteenth Doctor. On 24 September 2021, the BBC announced that Chibnall would be succeeded by Davies, who would be returning as the showrunner of Doctor Who.

Chibnall's run as showrunner has been divisive among fans of Doctor Who, receiving criticism for the scripts, characterization, and the perceived retcon of the Doctor's origins in the episode "The Timeless Children". Some have further accused Chibnall's run of being too politically correct or "woke"; conversely, others have argued it promotes conservatism through its perceived messaging and portrayal of minorities.

=== Novels ===
Chibnall's debut crime novel Death at the White Hart was published by Penguin Books in March 2025, and became a Sunday Times bestseller. Set in a fictional town in Dorset, in a similar mould to Broadchurch, DS Nicola Bridge and DC Harry Ward, investigate a murder in a village whose residents all keep hidden secrets.

Before the novel had been published, it was announced that ITV had commissioned a TV adaptation from Chibnall to be aired on ITV1 and distributed internationally.

The sequel, The Parkwood Murders, featuring the same detectives, will be published on 16 July 2026.

== Personal life ==
In the 1990s, Chibnall met Madeline Joinson, a producer for the company Out of Joint. They were married in 2002. They have two sons, born 2003 and 2006.

== Selected credits ==
Production	Notes	Broadcaster
Life on Mars	Series 1, Episode 7 (2006); Series 2, Episode 2 (2007)	BBC One
Torchwood	"Day One" (2006); "Cyberwoman" (2006); "Countrycide" (2006); "End of Days" (2007); "Kiss Kiss, Bang Bang" (2008); "Adrift" (2008); "Fragments" (2008); "Exit Wounds" (2008)	BBC Two/BBC Three
Doctor Who	"42" (2007); "The Hungry Earth" / "Cold Blood" (2010); Pond Life (2012 series of mini-episodes); "Dinosaurs on a Spaceship" (2012); "The Power of Three" (2012); "P.S." (2012 mini-episode); "Twice Upon a Time" (1 uncredited scene, 2017)	BBC One/BBC Red Button, as writer
Doctor Who	"The Woman Who Fell to Earth" (2018); "The Ghost Monument" (2018); "Rosa" (co-written with Malorie Blackman, 2018); "Arachnids in the UK" (2018); "The Tsuranga Conundrum" (2018); "The Battle of Ranskoor Av Kolos" (2018); "Resolution" (2019); "Spyfall" (2020); "Fugitive of the Judoon" (co-written with Vinay Patel, 2020); "Praxeus" (co-written with Pete McTighe, 2020); "Can You Hear Me?" (co-written with Charlene James, 2020); "Ascension of the Cybermen" / "The Timeless Children" (2020); "Revolution of the Daleks" (2021); Flux (2021); ("The Halloween Apocalypse" / "War of the Sontarans" / "Once, Upon Time" / "Village of the Angels" (co-written with Maxine Alderton) / "Survivors of the Flux" / "The Vanquishers"); "Eve of the Daleks" (2022); "Legend of the Sea Devils" (co-written with Ella Road, 2022); "The Power of the Doctor" (2022)	BBC One/BBC Red Button, as showrunner
Doctor Who Access All Areas	Guest, 3 episodes (2018)	YouTube
Law & Order: UK	"Care" (2009); "Vice" (2009); "Unsafe" (2009); "Paradise" (2009); "Samaritan" (2010); "Honour Bond" (2010)	ITV
United	TV Film (2011)	BBC Two
Broadchurch	Creator, 24 episodes: Series 1 (2013); Series 2 (2015); Series 3 (2017)	ITV
The Great Train Robbery	TV Film (2013)	BBC One
Ant & Dec's Saturday Night Takeaway	"Who Shot Simon Cowell?" (2016)	ITV
Agatha Christie's Seven Dials	Adapted from The Seven Dials Mystery by Agatha Christie	Netflix
