= Scenes of crime officer =

Officer who gathers forensic evidence for the British police

A scenes of crime officer (SOCO) /ˈsɒkoʊ/ is an officer who gathers forensic evidence for the British police. They are also referred to by some forces as forensic scene investigators (FSIs), crime scene investigators (CSIs) (although their job differs from that depicted in the CBS TV series), or crime scene examiners (CSEs). SOCOs are usually not police officers, but are employed by the police forces. Evidence collected is passed to the detectives of the Criminal Investigation Department and to the forensic laboratories. The SOCOs do not investigate crimes or analyse evidence themselves. To be a SOCO, at least 5 GCSEs at Grade level 9 - 4 are required.

== History ==
SOCOs were first introduced into the Metropolitan Police in 1968, replacing the CID officers who had previously carried out these functions. Some other forces had introduced them before that time, however.

Other police forces around the United Kingdom continued this trend of replacing the CID officers with civilians. This allowed the creation of dedicated departments within the police forces. Police officers often moved post after only a few years; the introduction of civilian scenes of crime officers allowed departments to build a resource based on experience.

== Training ==
Today, the majority of police forces use a central training resource for the initial and development needs of their SOCOs. With the introduction of forensic science degrees at university level, the standard of candidates for employment is increasing. Once in post, trainee SOCOs attend a nine-week residential training course. During this course, a prospective SOCO will learn about fingerprint recovery techniques, DNA retrieval, photography, road traffic collisions (RTCs), and trace evidence, amongst other areas of knowledge. Upon the successful conclusion of this course, SOCOs are then invited to further their knowledge by undertaking a two-year diploma. SOCOs are expected to demonstrate a high level of further learning by liaising with colleagues, peers and other services within the law enforcement sector. This is demonstrated by submitting six dissertations discussing specialist forensic areas or elaborating on existing techniques or equipment.

In 2001, the Council for the Registration of Forensic Practitioners (CRFP) was created. This was in response to the lack of regulation within the world of forensic science. Whilst registration is not compulsory, SOCOs are encouraged to apply for registration. The registration process involves the applicant submitting case studies on crime scenes they have examined. These are then subjected to their peers, who assess the applicant's work based on best practise. The introduction of the CRFP is aiming to raise the standard of practise and credibility within the forensic departments who work alongside law enforcement agencies.

In 2009, the Forensic Science Regulator argued that the CRFP was surplus to requirements, and consequently the CRFP closed its doors on 31 March 2009. At an Extraordinary General Meeting the Board of the CRFP decided the organisation could no longer fulfil its objects and therefore resolved that the company should cease trading. The key factors in this were given as: 1. the decision of the Chief Executive of the National Policing Improvement Agency communicated in a letter of 4 February 2009 that he was “not currently prepared to authorise the release of any money to the CRFP for the 2009/2010 financial year” 2. the circular letter to all chief constables issued by the Association of Chief Police Officers Forensics Portfolio holder and the Chief Executive of the National Policing Improvement Agency dated 6 January 2009 strongly encouraging police forces “to review their future commitment to CRFP registration and the financial commitment that this requires” and 3. the consequent decision of the Metropolitan Police Service, communicated in a letter dated 2 February 2009, that “the MPS from 1 April 2009 will cease to fund subscription of MPS staff that wish to register for CRFP and will remove CRFP registration as a condition for pay progression” and 4. the decision of the Home Office, communicated in a letter dated 31 February 2009, that they “can see no basis to commit the further £175,000 of public money requested by the CRFP”.

Entrance requirements vary between individual forces - most expect candidates to possess at least good GCSEs or A levels. Good photographic ability is essential and a qualification in photography can prove advantageous. Possession of a physics or forensic science-related qualification at any level can also be helpful.

== Operations ==
SOCOs examine crime scenes ranging from criminal damage to burglary to homicide, although the forensic science provider for the particular police force in question will often be called in to deal with the more complex forensic opportunities that arise during homicide investigations.

The average day for a SOCO involves dealing with victims of crime amongst members of the public, photographing injuries to victims of assault, and examining crime scenes. Most police forces operate an "on call" system. This means that out of office hours are still covered by a SOCO. Most departments cover the hours between 7am and 10pm, with one SOCO "on call" from 10pm to 7am. This SOCO deals with crime scenes that cannot be preserved for the following day.

== Australia ==
The New South Wales Police Force in Australia uses police and civilian scenes of crime officers (SOCOs) in a similar manner to their British counterparts. SOCOs are part of the Forensic Services Group.

Generally SOCOs are limited in the types of tasks they can handle due to their training and scope in which they operate. Major incidents and more serious offences/investigations are handled by full-time sworn officers and specialists from the Forensic Services Group.
