= Cultural depictions of blindness =

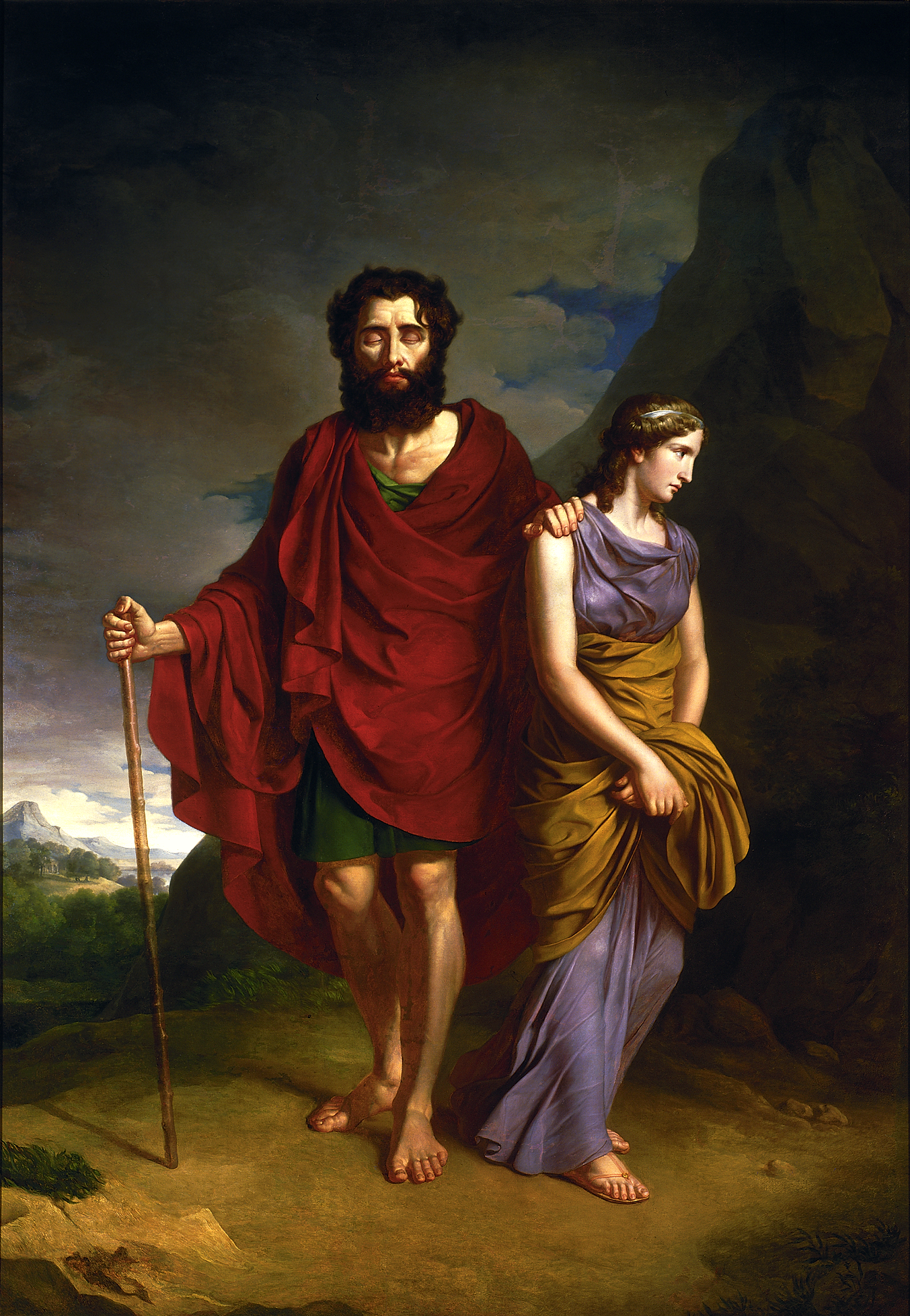
Oedipus and Antigone (Antoni Brodowski, 1828)

The theme of blindness has been explored by many different cultures throughout history, with blind characters appearing in stories from ancient Greek mythology and Judeo-Christian religious texts. In the modern era, blindness has featured in numerous works of literature and poetry by authors such as William Shakespeare, William Blake, and H. G. Wells, and has also been a recurring trope in film and other visual media.

== Religion and mythology ==
- In Greek mythology:
  - Oedipus is depicted as blinding himself in the Sophocles play Oedipus Rex. Upon discovering that he has unknowingly killed his father and married his mother, Oedipus bursts into his wife's bed-chamber and discovers that she has hanged herself. Taking the brooches from her dress, he drives the pins into his eyes, exclaiming: "You have looked enough upon those you ought never to have looked upon". In Sophocles's Oedipus at Colonus, Oedipus is a wandering outcast, led and supported by his daughter Antigone. Although this is the best-known version of the story, an alternative tradition is preserved in the surviving fragments of Euripides's Oedipus, according to which Oedipus was blinded by a servant of his father, Laius.
  - Evenius/Peithenius from Apollonia was tasked with guarding the sacred sheep of the sun god Helios, but failed at his task, as the sheep were devoured by wolves, and the Apollonians in retaliation blinded him. A famine then broke out, as a result of Helios' anger over the treatment of Evenius; the Apollonians then consulted the Oracle of Delphi, which ordered them to compensate Evenius by offering him reparations. The earth grew fertile again, and the gods additionally blessed Evenius with the gift of prophecy.
  - There are many stories in which the gods inflict blindness on mortals, often as a punishment for disrespect, or for violating a taboo. One well-known example is the prophet Tiresias, whose blindness is ascribed to various causes. According to one story, it was a punishment for revealing the secrets of the gods; according to another, he was struck blind after accidentally witnessing Athena bathing; in a third, he was blinded by Hera after taking Zeus's side in a dispute. Meanwhile, Erymanthus was blinded by the goddess Aphrodite when he saw her bathing naked after she had had sex with her lover Adonis. Other examples of mythological characters blinded by the gods include Lycurgus, Thamyris, Aepytus II, Phineus, Ilus, Rhoecus, and Anchises.
  - Characters blinded not by gods but by humans include Polyphemus, Phoenix, Plexippus and Pandion, Polymestor, and Metope.
  - Sometimes, blind people in Greek mythology are granted special abilities by way of compensation. Tiresias and Evenius received the gift of prophecy, and the poet Demodocus was granted a beautiful voice.
- There are several blind figures in the Hebrew Bible:
  - Lot's visitors in Genesis 19 inflicted blindness on the Sodomite mob who had demanded that Lot send them out of his house so that they might "know", i.e. rape, them.
  - In Genesis 27, Jacob takes advantage of his father Isaac's blindness to steal the blessing intended for his elder brother Esau. He dresses himself in Esau's clothes, and wraps goatskins around his hands and neck. Isaac recognises Jacob's voice, but is deceived by the smell of his garments and the hairiness of his hands, and therefore gives him the blessing.
  - In Judges 16, Samson is captured by the Philistines, who put out his eyes and set him to forced labour. On the occasion of a great religious festival, Samson is brought into the temple of Dagon, for the entertainment of the Philistines assembled there. However, to avenge himself for the loss of his eyes, Samson topples the two central pillars and brings down the roof of the temple, killing himself and everyone within.
  - In 1 Samuel 3, the high priest Eli becomes blind with age, at the time of the calling of Samuel. In chapter 4, following the capture of the Ark of the Covenant by the Philistines, Eli enquires about the cause of the commotion in the city. When he is told that the Ark has been taken, he falls backwards out of his seat and breaks his neck.
  - In 1 Kings 14, the son of the Israelite king Jeroboam falls sick, and Joroboam sends his wife to consult the blind prophet Ahijah. She disguises herself, intending to conceal her identity, but Ahijah is informed by God that she is coming. As soon as she enters, therefore, he addresses her as the wife of Jeroboam, and tells her that the child will die.
- In the deuterocanonical Book of Tobit, Tobit loses his sight when sparrow droppings fall into his eyes. He becomes dependent on his wife, and prays for death, but God sends the angel Raphael in answer to his prayers. Raphael shows Tobit's son, Tobias, how to use the gall of a fish to cure blindness; Tobias anoints his father's eyes with the gall, and he is healed.
- In the Christian New Testament, Jesus performs a miraculous healing of the blind on several occasions:
  - All three synoptic gospels give an account of Jesus healing the blind near Jericho. In each of these stories, a blind beggar hears that Jesus is passing by, and cries out "Jesus, Son of David, have mercy on me". The crowd rebukes the beggar, but Jesus calls him forward and heals him with a word, or by touching his eyes.
  - In another story in the Gospel of Mark, Jesus heals a blind man of Bethsaida by rubbing spittle into his eyes. After the first application, his vision is still imperfect, but when Jesus places his hands over the man's eyes a second time, his sight is completely restored.
  - In the Gospel of John, Jesus heals a man who was blind from birth, which is said in the narrative to be the only time that such a thing had been done. The cure in this story is more complex; Jesus anoints the man's eyes with a mixture of clay and spittle, then tells him to wash them in the Pool of Siloam. Jesus later makes use of this miracle as a metaphor, explaining that he came into the world so that the blind might see, and condemning the spiritual blindness of the Pharisees.
- In Norse mythology, Höðr is a blind god, who is tricked by Loki into killing Baldr.

== Literature and theatre ==
- In Philip Sidney's 16th-century work Arcadia, the princes Pyrocles and Musidorus encounter an elderly blind man, who is entreating his son, Leonatus, to lead him to the top of a cliff so that he might throw himself off. The blind man was once a king, but he explains to the princes how he was persuaded by an illegitimate son, Plexirtus, to order the death of his other son, Leonatus. Plexirtus, believing Leonatus to be dead, then usurped the throne and put out his father's eyes. After hearing this story, Pyrocles and Musidorus help to defeat Plexirtus and install Leonatus on the throne, at which point the blind king dies suddenly from an excess of emotion.
- A sub-plot of William Shakespeare's King Lear takes inspiration from the story of the blind king in Arcadia. The Earl of Gloucester is betrayed by his illegitimate son Edmund, which eventually results in Gloucester's eyes being plucked out by Lear's daughter Regan and her husband. Having been turned out by Regan onto the heath, Gloucester encounters his first-born son Edgar, but doesn't recognise him, and asks him to lead him to a clifftop. Unwilling to do so, Edgar tricks Gloucester into believing himself to have fallen from a cliff and miraculously survived. When Edgar finally reveals his identity to his father, Gloucester suffers heart failure and dies.
- King Arthur, a 17th-century opera by Henry Purcell and John Dryden, features a blind woman named Emmeline, who is engaged to King Arthur. Having been blind from birth, she is portrayed as having very confused ideas about the world—she is unaware, for instance, that there is any physical difference between herself and Arthur, and later expresses a belief that his face is made of gold. Her blindness is eventually cured through Merlin's magic.
- In William Blake's 18th-century poem "Tiriel", the titular Tiriel goes blind with age and grief, blaming his condition on his rebellious sons. He delivers a curse which kills almost all of his children, and then commands his youngest and only surviving daughter, Hela, to lead him to the Vales of Har, where his own parents live. Upon arrival there, he curses his parents and dies at their feet.
- The Man Who Laughs, an 1869 novel by Victor Hugo, features a blind girl named Dea.
- In Mithyabhiman, an 1871 comic play in the Gujarati language, the protagonist's attempts to conceal his nyctalopia (night-blindness) involves him in a series of difficult situations.
- Marianela is an 1878 Spanish novel by Benito Pérez Galdós, in which a blind boy falls in love with an unattractive girl, who is afraid to meet him when he recovers his sight.
- "The Country of the Blind" by H. G. Wells tells the story of a mountaineer who finds himself stranded in an isolated valley inhabited entirely by blind people. Remembering the proverb, "In the Country of the Blind the One-eyed Man is King", he attempts to establish himself as ruler of the country, but finds himself unable to explain the concept of sight to them, or to satisfactorily demonstrate the advantages of it, and the community considers him delusional.
- Max Carrados is a fictional blind detective created by Ernest Bramah, appearing in several works published between 1914 and 1934.
- In Samuel Beckett's play Waiting for Godot, the character of Pozzo is struck blind between the first and second acts.
- In John Wyndham's 1951 novel The Day of the Triffids, a large proportion of the world's population becomes blind overnight, after witnessing an unusual meteor shower. This deprives humanity of its one advantage over the poisonous ambulatory plants known as triffids, and leads to an apocalyptic breakdown of society.
- Butterflies Are Free is a 1969 play by Leonard Gershe, about a blind man's relationship with a free-spirited hippy, which was adapted into a 1972 movie.
- In The Cay, a 1969 teen novel by Theodore Taylor, a blind boy is stranded on an island following a shipwreck.
- In Frank Herbert's Dune series, the character of Paul Atreides is blinded by exposure to radiation, but retains the ability to see by means of his precognitive powers.
- The Parable of the Blind is a 1985 German novel by Gert Hofmann, about six blind men who serve as models for the Pieter Bruegel painting The Blind Leading the Blind.
- The plot of Asuryalok, a 1987 Gujarati novel by Bhagwatikumar Sharma, revolves around a family's hereditary blindness.
- How Late It Was, How Late, a 1994 novel by James Kelman, focuses on the struggle of a working-class ex-convict to cope with a sudden onset of blindness.
- Blindness, a 1995 Portuguese novel by José Saramago, depicts the social breakdown which follows an epidemic of blindness.
- The Insult is a 1996 novel by Rupert Thomson, in which a blind man insists that he is able to see.
- Sound of Colors, a 2001 Taiwanese children's book by Jimmy Liao, explores the thoughts of a blind girl travelling on the subway.
- The Million Dollar Putt is a 2006 children's novel by Dan Gutman, in which a blind teenager takes part in a golf tournament.
- Massage is a 2008 Chinese novel by Bi Feiyu, about blind masseurs.
- All the Light We Cannot See, a 2014 novel by Anthony Doerr, tells the story of a blind French girl during World War II.

=== Non-fiction ===
- John Milton, "When I Consider How My Light is Spent", a 17th-century sonnet, is thought to be a reflection on his loss of sight.
- James Wilson, Biography of the Blind (1820), a history of blind people, and Wilson's own autobiography
- Helen Keller wrote several autobiographical works, beginning with The Story of My Life in 1903 (which inspired a 1959 Broadway play, The Miracle Worker).
- A Girl and Five Brave Horses is a 1961 memoir by Sonora Webster Carver, a blind horse diver.
- If You Could See What I Hear is a 1975 book by blind musician Tom Sullivan, which was adapted into a 1982 movie.
- A Sense of the World, by Jason Roberts, is a 2006 biography of the 19th-century British traveller James Holman, the first blind person to circumnavigate the globe.

== Film and television ==
- City Lights is a 1931 Charlie Chaplin film in which "The Tramp" falls in love with a blind girl.
- The Tale of Zatoichi is a 1962 film about a blind masseur and swordsman (the first in a series of 26 films starring the character of Zatoichi).
- A Patch of Blue is a 1965 film about the friendship between an educated black man and an illiterate, blind, white girl.
- Tommy is a 1975 film adaptation of a rock opera by The Who, about a boy who is psychosomatically deaf, mute, and blind.
- Star Trek: The Next Generation, a 1987–1994 TV series, features blind character Geordi La Forge, who makes use of technological devices that allow him to see.
- "Many, Many Monkeys" is a 1989 episode of The Twilight Zone, in which an epidemic of blindness is described as a judgement upon society for "turning a blind eye" to the sufferings of others.
- Proof is a 1991 film about a blind photographer, who distrusts other people's descriptions of the world around him.
- Scent of a Woman, a 1992 remake of a 1974 Italian film, is about a student who takes a job as an assistant to an irritable blind man.
- In the 1995 X-Files episode "2Shy" (season three, episode 6), Aloka McLean plays Jesse Landis, a blind pre-teen who discovers the murder of her mother primarily by smelling her perfume in the murderer's apartment.
- Colors of the Blind is a 1997 Chinese film about a blind girl training to become a competitive sprinter.
- Ray is a 2004 biographical film which focuses on 30 years in the life of blind musician Ray Charles.
- Black is a 2005 film about a deafblind woman's relationship with her teacher.
- Avatar: The Last Airbender, a 2005–2008 TV series, features blind character Toph Beifong.
- Love and Honor is a 2006 Japanese film about a blind samurai.
- Blind is a 2011 South Korean film in which a blind woman helps to track down a murderer.
- What They Don't Talk About When They Talk About Love is a 2013 Indonesian film about two visually impaired teenage girls in search of love.
- Blind is a 2014 film about a blind woman who succumbs to paranoia.
- Daredevil is a 2015-18 TV series produced by Marvel featuring protagonist Matthew Murdock, a blind vigilante and lawyer.
- Don't Breathe is a 2016 horror film, in which three friends get trapped inside a blind man's house while breaking into it.
- Notes on Blindness is a 2016 documentary film about John M. Hull, blind theologian and author of Touching the Rock: An Experience of Blindness.
- In the Dark is a 2019 TV series about a blind woman attempting to solve a murder.
- See is a 2019 science-fiction TV series, set in a post-apocalyptic world in which the human race has lost the sense of sight.
- Daredevil: Born Again is a 2025 TV series and follow up to 2015's Daredevil.

== Other media ==
- Several blind characters have been created by Marvel Comics, including Daredevil, Blind Al, Blindfold, Destiny, Madame Web, and Julia Carpenter.
- Blind characters created by DC Comics include Doctor Mid-Nite and Crazy Quilt.
- Kenshi Takahashi is a blind swordsman created for the Mortal Kombat video game series.
