= Revealer =

Revealer may refer to:

- The Revealer, an online magazine published by the Center for Religion and Media at New York University
- Revealer (album), a 2002 album by Madison Cunningham
- Revealer (film), a 2022 horror film

== See also ==
- The Revealers, a 2003 novel by Doug Wilhelm
