= Reveal =

Reveal, Revealed, or The Reveal may refer to:

== People ==
- Reveal (rapper) (born 1983), member of the British hip hop group Poisonous Poets
- James L. Reveal (1941–2015), American botanist

== Arts, entertainment, and media ==
=== Literature ===
- Revealed, a 2013 novel in the House of Night series by P. C. and Kristin Cast
- Revealed (Margaret Peterson Haddix novel)), a novel by Margaret Peterson Haddix
- The Revealers, a 2003 children's novel by Doug Wilhelm

=== Music ===
==== Labels ====
- Reveal Records, a UK record label
- Revealed Recordings, a Dutch record label created by Hardwell

==== Albums ====
- Reveal (Fischer-Z album), 1987
- Reveal (R.E.M. album), 2001
- Reveal, by Future Leaders of the World, 2015
- Reveal (The Boyz album), by The Boyz, 2020
- Revealed (Deitrick Haddon album), 2008
- Revealed (Pink Floyd album), 1973
- Revealed – Live in Dallas, a 2010 album by Myron Butler & Levi
- Revealing (album), a 1977 album by James Blood Ulmer

==== Songs ====
- "Dissolve/Reveal", a 1984 song by Tom Verlaine from Cover
- "Revealed", a 1991 song by Cliff Eidelman from Star Trek VI: The Undiscovered Country
- "Reveal", a 2003 song by Celine Dion from One Heart
- "Revealed", a 2005 song by Blank & Jones and Steve Kilbey from Relax Edition 2
- "Reveal" (Roxette song), a 2006 song by Roxette from Roxette Hits
- "Reveal", a 2011 song by Boom Bip from Zig Zaj
- "The Reveal", a 2017 song by Danny Elfman from Tulip Fever

=== Periodicals ===
- Reveal, a magazine published by Nat Mags
- Reveal Magazine, part of the Property Brothers franchise
- The Revealer, an online magazine which reviews religion in the news

=== Television ===
- Revealed (Australian TV program) Australian current affair program
- Revealed (Australian documentary series), an investigative documentary series
- Revealed (UK TV programme), a UK news programme for teenagers
- Revealed, a 2002–2011 UK documentary series, whose performers have included Suzie Kennedy
- Revealed with Jules Asner, a 2001–2003 American biography series
- "Reveal", a 2020 episode of the animated series 12 oz. Mouse
- "The Reveal" (Battle for Dream Island), a 2011 animated web series episode

=== Other uses in arts, entertainment, and media ===
- Reveal (narrative), in show business and literature, the exposure of a "twist"
- Reveal (podcast), an investigative reporting podcast
- The Revealed, an internet documentary project about gorillas
- Revealer (film), a 2022 horror film

== Other uses ==
- Reveal (carpentry), a type of joint
- Reveal system, a system of plant classification

== See also ==
- Revelation (disambiguation)
