= Book of Revelation (disambiguation) =

The Book of Revelation is the last book of the New Testament in the Bible.

Book of Revelation may also refer to:

- The Book of Revelation (novel), a novel by Rupert Thomson
- The Book of Revelation (film), a 2006 film based on Rupert Thomson's novel
- Yazidi Book of Revelation, a holy book of the Yazidi religion
- Breed II: Book of Revelation, a Breed comics limited series
- Hegelian Dialectic (The Book of Revelation), a 2017 album by Prodigy
- "Book of Revelation", a song by The Drums from Portamento, 2011

== See also ==
- Revelation (disambiguation)
