= Revelation (disambiguation) =

Revelation, in religion and theology, is the act of revealing through communication with supernatural entities.

Revelation(s) commonly refers to:

- Book of Revelation or simply Revelation, the last book of the New Testament
- Revelation (Latter Day Saints), teaching of the Latter Day Saint movement
- Private revelation, in the Catholic Church, a revelation from God to a specific Christian
- Revelation of the Veiled, the Persian treatise on Sufism
- Reveal (narrative), in literature and show business, the exposure of a previously hidden key element of the plot or the performance
- Theophany, the appearance of a deity in an observable way
- Epiphany (feeling), an experience of sudden and striking insight

Revelation(s) may also refer to:

== Literature ==
=== Comics ===
- The Transformers: Revelation, a comic book miniseries
- Revelation, a Morlock associated with the X-Men in the Marvel Comics universe

=== Novels ===
- Revelation, a 1982 novel by W. A. Harbinson
- Revelation, a 1991 novel by David Bischoff, the third installment in The UFO Conspiracy trilogy
- Revelation, a 2000 novel by Bill Napier
- Revelation, a 2001 novel by Carol Berg
- Revelation (Polish: Apokalipsa według Pana Jana), a 2003 novel by Robert J. Szmidt
- Mass Effect: Revelation, a 2007 novel by Drew Karpyshyn, the first novel set in the universe of the Mass Effect video game series
- Revelation, a 2008 novel by Kate Brian, the eighth installment in the Private novel series
- Revelation (Sansom novel), 2008, by C. J. Sansom
- Revelation (Star Wars novel), a 2008 novel by Karen Traviss, the eighth installment in the Legacy of the Force series
- Revelation, a 2011 novel by Colin Winnette
- Lucifer: Revelation, a 2014 novel by Paul Darrow, based on the BBC television series Blake's 7 and the second installment of the Lucifer trilogy

=== Other literature ===
- "Revelation" (short story), a 1964 story by Flannery O'Connor
- "Revelation", a poem by Liz Lochhead
- Révélation$, a book by Denis Robert and Ernest Backes concerning banking giant Clearstream

== Film and television ==
=== Film ===
- Revelation (1918 film), a film starring Alla Nazimova
- Revelation (1924 film), a film starring Viola Dana, Monte Blue and Lew Cody
- Revelation (2001 film), a horror film directed by Stuart Urban
- Apocalypse II: Revelation, a 1999 Christian/thriller film
- Revelation – Perth International Film Festival, an annual film festival in Australia

=== Television ===
==== Episodes ====
- "Revelation" (Grimm)
- "Revelation" (Transformers: Cybertron)
- "Revelation" (Young Justice)

==== Other uses in television ====
- Revelation Films, a British distributor of science fiction, drama and anime television series
- Revelation TV, a British Christian television channel
- Revelation (TV series), a 2020 Australian three-episode documentary series presented by Sarah Ferguson
- Red vs. Blue: Revelation, eighth season of a web series

== Music and dance ==
=== Albums ===
- Revelation (98 Degrees album), 2000
- Revelation (Armored Saint album), 2000
- Revelation (The Brian Jonestown Massacre album), 2014
- Revelation (Christopher Lee album), 2006
- Revelation (Joe Nichols album) or the title song, 2004
- Revelation (Journey album) or the title instrumental, "The Journey (Revelation)", 2008
- Revelation (Man album), 1969
- Revelation (Peter Andre album), 2009
- Revelation (Sons of Sylvia album) or the title song, 2010
- Revelation (Third Day album) or the title song, 2008
- Revelation (Ultravox album) or the title song, 1993
- Rev.elation, a 2005 album by Joe Locke and the Milt Jackson Tribute Band
- Revelation, a 2004 album by David Phelps
- Revelation, a 2007 album by Lord Belial
- Revelation, a 2018 album by Reef
- Revelation, a 2022 album by G.E.M.

=== Songs ===
- "Revelation" (Troye Sivan and Jónsi song), 2018
- "Revelation", by the Autumn Offering from Revelations of the Unsung, 2004
- "Revelation", by Black Veil Brides from Wretched and Divine: The Story of the Wild Ones, 2013
- "Revelation", by Borealis from Purgatory, 2015
- "Revelation", by D12 from Devil's Night, 2001
- "Revelation", by Gamma Ray from Majestic, 2005
- "Revelation", by the Haunted from Made Me Do It, 2000
- "Revelation", by Helloween from Better Than Raw, 1998
- "Revelation", by Insomnium from Shadows of the Dying Sun, 2014
- "Revelation", by Joe Satriani from Professor Satchafunkilus and the Musterion of Rock, 2008
- "Revelation", by Love from Da Capo, 1966
- "Revelation", by Morgan Wallen from I'm the Problem, 2025
- "Revelation", by Yellowjackets from Shades, 1986
- "Revelation (Divus Pennae ex Tragoedia)", by Symphony X from Paradise Lost, 2007
- "Revelation (Mother Earth)", by Ozzy Osbourne from Blizzard of Ozz, 1980
- "Revelation Song", written by Jennie Lee Riddle and first recorded in 2004; covered by Phillips, Craig and Dean, 2009

=== Other uses in music and dance ===
- Revelation (band), American doom metal band
- Revelation Records, American record label
- Revelation Records (jazz), American record label

== Video games ==
- Revelation Online, PC MMORPG
- Myst IV: Revelation, a computer game in the Myst franchise
- Revelation, a fictional computer virus in the video game Uplink

== Other uses ==
- Revelation, a brand of expanding suitcases now marketed by Antler Luggage
- Revelation, trade name of a ceramic kiln developed by Horace Caulkins
- Revelation Mountains, Alaska, U.S.
- Revelation Plaatjie (born 1982), South African cricketer
- Slipstream Revelation, kit aircraft

== See also ==
- Book of Revelation (disambiguation)
- Revelations (disambiguation)
- The Revelation (disambiguation)
- Reveal (disambiguation)
- Revelación, EP by Selena Gomez
