= Broadchurch =

British crime drama TV series, 2013–2017

- Genre: Crime drama Mystery drama Drama
- Created by: Chris Chibnall
- Written by: Chris Chibnall; Louise Fox (one episode)
- Starring: David Tennant; Olivia Colman; Jodie Whittaker; Jonathan Bailey; Charlotte Beaumont; Andrew Buchan; Arthur Darvill; Matthew Gravelle; Carolyn Pickles; Adam Wilson
- Ending theme: "So Close" by Ólafur Arnalds featuring Arnór Dan series 1 "So Far" by Ólafur Arnalds featuring Arnór Dan series 2 "Take My Leave of You" by Ólafur Arnalds featuring Arnór Dan series 3
- Composer: Ólafur Arnalds
- Country of origin: United Kingdom
- Original language: English
- No. of series: 3
- No. of episodes: 24 (list of episodes)

Production
- Executive producers: Chris Chibnall; Jane Featherstone
- Producer: Richard Stokes: Dan Winch series 3
- Cinematography: Matt Gray
- Running time: 46–51 minutes
- Production companies: Kudos; Imaginary Friends

Original release
- Network: ITV
- Release: 4 March 2013 – 17 April 2017

Related
- Gracepoint; Malaterra

Broadchurch is a British crime drama television series broadcast on ITV for three series between 2013 and 2017. It was created by Chris Chibnall, who acted as an executive producer and wrote all 24 episodes; it was produced by Kudos in association with Imaginary Friends Productions Ltd. The series is set in Broadchurch, a fictional English town on the coast of Dorset; it focuses on Detective Inspector Alec Hardy (David Tennant) and Detective Sergeant Ellie Miller (Olivia Colman). Other members of the ensemble cast appearing in all three seasons are Jodie Whittaker, Andrew Buchan, Arthur Darvill, Carolyn Pickles, Jonathan Bailey, Matthew Gravelle, Charlotte Beaumont and Adam Wilson.

The first series, which premiered on 4 March 2013, focuses on the death of local 11-year-old Danny Latimer and the impact of grief, mutual suspicion and media attention on the town. Danny's family, his mother, Beth (Whittaker), father, Mark (Buchan) and sister, Chloe (Beaumont), is a key focus. The second series, which premiered on 5 January 2015, follows the dual story lines of bringing Danny's killer to justice and a case from the past returning to haunt Hardy. The third and final series, which premiered on 27 February 2017, focuses on the rape of a local woman, Trish Winterman (Julie Hesmondhalgh), at a birthday party, while the Latimer family goes to extreme lengths to move on from Danny's death. Chibnall has stated that the third series was the last and that he had originally envisioned Broadchurch as a trilogy.

All three series received positive reviews and praise for the writing, cinematography, performances (particularly Tennant and Colman) and character development.

== Episodes ==
Series	Episodes	Originally released		Average UK viewers (millions)
Series	Episodes	First released	Last released	Average UK viewers (millions)
1	8	4 March 2013	22 April 2013	9.37
2	8	5 January 2015	23 February 2015	9.68
3	8	27 February 2017	17 April 2017	10.75

== Development ==
=== Conception ===
Broadchurch creator and writer Chris Chibnall described the project as a labour of love. He conceived Broadchurch in about 2003 while working on his first series, Born and Bred. The concept for Broadchurch was to explore how a child's murder affects a small, close-knit local community and how the characters react to the media attention and mutual suspicion that arise.

The series' location was partly inspired by the Jurassic Coast in Dorset, where Chibnall lived. Chibnall says that he initially did not have a location in mind for the series, but the opportunity to improve his work-life balance made setting the show in Dorset appealing. From 2006 to 2011, Chibnall spent most of his time travelling about the UK and Ireland, working on Torchwood, Law & Order: UK and Camelot. By setting the show in Dorset, Chibnall did not have to spend time away from his home and family. His decision to set the show on the Jurassic Coast also helped him generate more ideas and tighten the writing. For example, Dorset-born poet and author Thomas Hardy's surname was used for one of the main characters (DI Alec Hardy). Alongside this, his first name, Alec, and other character's first name, Tess Henchard, are in reference to characters from Hardy's novels Tess of the d'Urbervilles and The Mayor of Casterbridge. Hardy's use of the term "Wessex" was used to name the fictional Wessex Police, and character Jack Marshall reads the Hardy novel Jude the Obscure.

The series' name also came from Dorset. Chibnall invented the name "Broadchurch" based on two settlements in Dorset: "I thought a lot about the literary heritage of this county. In true Thomas Hardy style, I came up with a compound location name of Broadchurch combining the hamlets of Broadoak and Whitchurch."

=== Writing ===
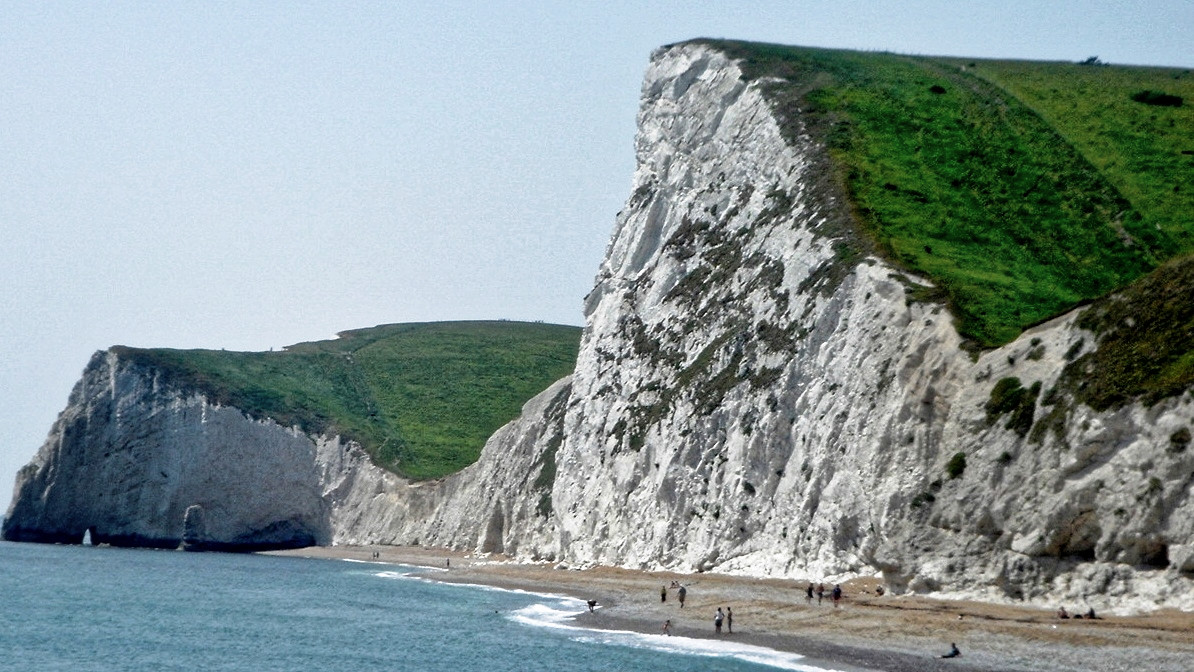
The Jurassic Coast of Dorset provided inspiration for Broadchurch.

Chibnall wrote the script for Broadchurch on spec after his work on Camelot had ended. He began using whiteboards in May 2011 to create backgrounds for each character and craft the plot of the series—which he envisioned as a trilogy. Series one was written to work both as the first of a trilogy and as a self-contained drama. He believed that it should be self-contained in case the show did not do well in the ratings and that a second series was not commissioned. Chibnall was assisted in this process by friends Sam Hoyle (a television script executive) and television director James Strong. The series was influenced by two American television shows, Twin Peaks (created by Mark Frost and David Lynch) and Murder One (created by Steven Bochco, Charles H. Eglee and Channing Gibson).

The story was nearly finished on the whiteboards when Chibnall began writing the script. After about two weeks, he had a draft of the first few episodes, but he had not yet settled on a killer. About two weeks later, Chibnall woke up one morning and realised the main suspect should be Joe Miller, DS Ellie Miller's husband. By making Joe the main suspect, Chibnall focused the series more closely on Ellie and improved the narrative structure of the series so that it became about two families (the Millers and the Latimers). He then redrafted the first script and re-plotted and re-outlined the series. However, Chibnall kept the script loose enough that he could choose another character as the murderer if his preferred solution leaked to the press during shooting.

Only the first few episodes were written before filming began. Chibnall waited until casting was complete and he saw the actors perform their roles before writing subsequent scripts. These later scripts were shaped to take advantage of each performer's take on their role.

=== Production approval ===
In autumn 2011, Chibnall pitched Broadchurch to Laura Mackie, the Head of Drama at ITV, who proved very enthusiastic about the proposal. Just a few days after she finished reading the scripts, she suggested that Chibnall contact Kudos, a production company. Mackie then took the show to ITV Director of Television Peter Fincham. Broadchurch was green-lit by Fincham almost immediately for airing in early 2013.

Although ITV made a sizeable financial investment in Broadchurch, additional funds were needed because of the cost of the large ensemble cast. Additional funds were sought from international partners, who would then win distribution rights in their territories. Before principal photography began, ZDF (German public-service television broadcaster) and BBC America (the American cable and satellite television network jointly owned by the BBC and AMC Networks) both provided additional funding.

Broadchurch was created and written by Chibnall and produced by Kudos in association with Shine America and Imaginary Friends. (Note: Kudos is a subsidiary of Shine Group. Shine America is the American subsidiary of Shine Group. Imaginary Friends is a production company established by Chris Chibnall to produce author-driven dramas.) Chibnall served as executive producer along with Kudos's Jane Featherstone, while Richard Stokes was producer.

== Series 1 ==
The first series of Broadchurch premiered on 4 March 2013 at 9:00 p.m. on ITV.

=== Casting ===
The role of Reverend Paul Coates was written with actor Arthur Darvill in mind and was the first role cast. The role of DS Ellie Miller was second, as actress Olivia Colman was Chibnall's first choice to play Miller and the role was offered to her without an audition. DI Alec Hardy was the third role cast, and the part was offered to David Tennant without an audition.

All the remaining parts were cast through auditions, which took several weeks. Although Chibnall had determined who the murderer was by the time casting began, those who auditioned for the programme were not told the killer's identity. The roles of Mark Latimer (father of the murdered child) and Karen White (a reporter for a national newspaper who comes to Broadchurch to challenge DI Hardy) were cast after Colman, Darvill, and Tennant. The role of Beth Latimer was cast after Mark Latimer and Karen White.

Matthew Gravelle was cast as Joe Miller, DS Miller's husband. Gravelle auditioned along with many other actors for the role, but Chibnall has said the casting team early on considered Gravelle their top choice for the role. (Note: Gravelle had worked for producer Richard Stokes in an episode of the series Holby City, and for Stokes and writer Chris Chibnall in "End of Days", an episode of Torchwood. In 2010, he'd been nominated for a BAFTA Cymru award as Best Actor for his work on Y Pris.) The producers knew this was a critical casting decision: whoever they hired to play Joe Miller would need to act with great power in the final episode, so they researched Gravelle's past acting roles and watched as many of his performances as they could find. Chibnall paid particularly close attention to the Welsh language television series Teulu, in which Gravelle had recently played a lead role.

=== Principal photography ===
James Strong directed five episodes of series one of Broadchurch; Euros Lyn directed three. Matt Gray was both director of photography and camera operator, and said he approached Broadchurch as if it were a documentary film, rather than a television drama. In Britain, very few scripted television programmes are filmed in the order seen on the air; it is far more common to shoot out of order. Usually, scripts are first broken down into their component scenes and shots. Scenes using the same locations or sets are shot at the same time, to minimise the time and expense of moving cameras and equipment. Broadchurch, however, was shot in order, to keep the identity of the murderer a secret until the end of the production.

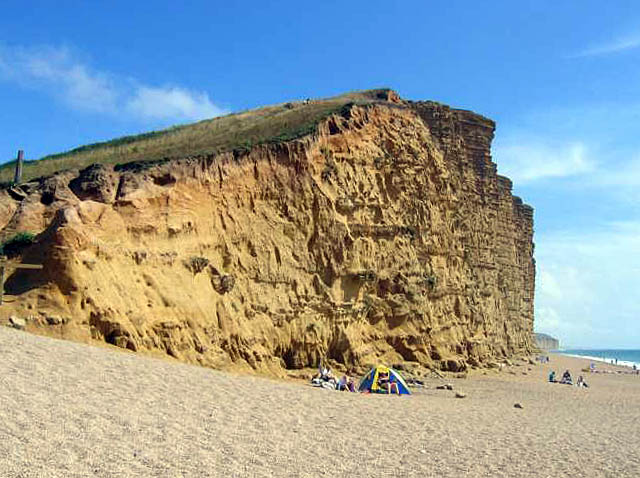
East Cliff and Beach in West Bay, Dorset, provided the South Coast scene for Danny Latimer's death in the series.

Most of Broadchurch series one was shot on location to heighten the reality and intimacy of the series and because the Dorset coast was integral to setting the mood of the drama. The first cast read-through occurred at Bloomsbury Central Baptist Church in London on 7 August 2012. Principal photography began on interior sets at Vision Studios on 13 August 2012. Location shooting began the first week of September. Most location photography occurred in the town of Clevedon in north Somerset. Some scenes were also shot in the towns of Bridport and West Bay in Dorset. Three locations were used in the area around Yate, South Gloucestershire, and two in Bristol. Other filming locations included Shepton Mallet, Portishead, and Weston-super-Mare, and the villages of Eype and Flax Bourton. The oft-seen cliff where Danny Latimer's body is found and which features heavily in the visuals of Broadchurch, is Harbour Cliff and Harbour Cliff Beach in West Bay. Many of the villages involved in the shooting of Broadchurch received a boost in tourism, especially in West Bay and Bridport.

Not all shooting was done on location. Some sets were built at Vision Studios near Bristol, because equipment needs made it impractical to film on location. Two shots required green screen shots to composite images together. These "green screen" shots were filmed at Waterloo Film Studios in London.

Rehearsal on Broadchurch was kept to a minimum. To heighten the raw and tension-filled tone of the show, actors were often prevented from seeing the space they were to perform in until shooting began. Almost no improvisation of dialogue occurred on the set. A heavy reliance was also placed on getting the first take right. Director James Strong believed the first take was more spontaneous and more natural than subsequent takes. Subsequently, most of what the viewer sees in Broadchurch series one are first takes.

Principal photography on Broadchurch series one concluded on 4 December 2012.

=== Secrecy ===
Chibnall was determined to ensure that the identity of the killer did not leak until the final episode aired. One reason for the secrecy was commercial: it encouraged viewers to keep watching. But Chibnall also believed that it would enhance the acting, as actors could not in any way telegraph or signal their innocence or guilt.

Several means were employed to maintain secrecy. All cast and crew were required to sign documents in which they agreed not to reveal the killer's identity.

In part, secrecy was maintained by the way scripts were written. Performers were given the first two scripts at the start of principal photography, but additional scripts were written only after Chibnall had observed the actors bringing their characters to life. Once the scripts for episodes six, seven and eight were finished, they were released all at once over a single weekend. Even after the final three scripts were distributed, just 29 people knew the killer's identity while the final episodes were filmed, including the four cast members critical to the "reveal". Actor Oskar McNamara, who played Danny Latimer, was informed about the killer's identity several days in advance, in part so that he could prepare and in part so the scene could be choreographed and rehearsed. These three episodes were then shot together.

=== Music ===
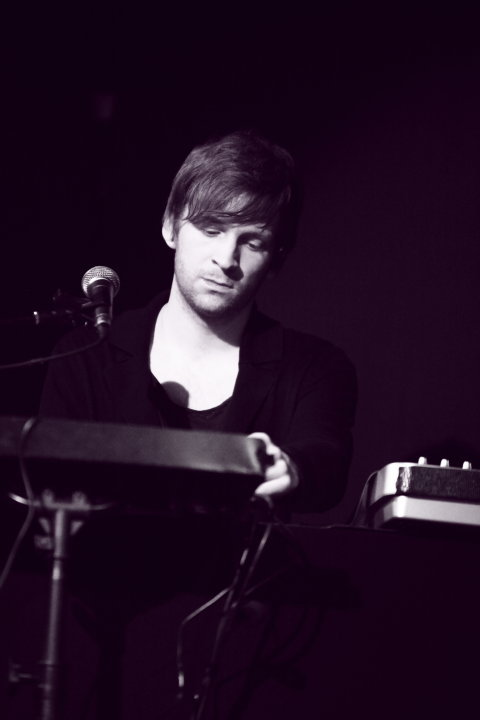
Icelandic musician Ólafur Arnalds composed the music and sounds for Broadchurch series one.

Broadchurch creator Chris Chibnall had long been a fan of Icelandic composer and musician Ólafur Arnalds, and owned all of his albums. While writing Broadchurch, Chibnall listened constantly to Ólafur's music. He later told Ólafur that the "entire feel of the show was inspired by" his music.

Ólafur agreed to join the production in December 2012. To compose the music for the first series of Broadchurch, Ólafur read the show's scripts to put himself in the right mood. He also researched sounds which might be heard in the Dorset area. He then improvised at the piano and composed several themes, some for the series as a whole and some for characters. Ólafur also composed certain sounds using synthesisers and electronic sound generators to go with certain spaces, such as the cliffs. Once he saw the completed footage for the first episode, he rearranged some themes to fit the imagery and composed some new themes as well. Because there was so little time between his being hired and the air date, Ólafur composed very quickly and spent very long days at work. He had just four months to generate about 30 minutes of sound and music for each episode, spending one and a half to two weeks on the music for each episode. Despite the time crunch, Ólafur credited Chibnall's relaxed attitude as the key to the music's success.

The music for Broadchurch deliberately avoided a typical orchestral score, which Ólafur felt sounded too large and perfect. The score was written for a string quartet and piano, accompanied by electronic sound. Recording, which took just five days, was done in an empty church in Reykjavík. The musical soundtrack to Broadchurch series one includes four pieces: "So Close" (the only one to have lyrics), "Suspects", "Arcade", and "Broken". "So Close" plays at the end of each episode. Ólafur collaborated with the singer Arnór Dan of the Icelandic band Agent Fresco, with whom he had worked on his third studio album, For Now I Am Winter, released in February 2013. Arnór wrote the vocal melody, while Ólafur wrote the rest of the song. Chibnall contributed the lyrics. According to Chibnall, the song holds clues to the killer's identity.

The Broadchurch (Music From the Original Soundtrack) extended play album was released on 15 April 2013 by Mercury Classics, a division of Decca Records. A second edition that includes songs from the first two series (excluding "Broken" from the first edition) was released in January 2015. An album for the third series, titled Broadchurch - The Final Chapter (Music from the Original TV Series) was released on 1 April 2017. Some of Ólafur's work for Broadchurch appears in the trailer for the Fantastic Four movie reboot.

=== Media releases ===
The first series of Broadchurch was released on DVD and Blu-ray in the United Kingdom by Acorn Media UK on 20 May 2013. The series was released on DVD in the United States on 1 April 2014 by Entertainment One.

== Series 2 ==
After the first series ended, ITV announced that Broadchurch would return for a second series. The show's creator, Chris Chibnall, told The Daily Mirror in the summer of 2013 that "the focus of the next series will be on how the shattered community rebuilds itself after the grisly events" of series one. Series one actor Will Mellor, who does not appear in series two, strongly implied in an interview that a new murder would not be the focus of the second series, while David Tennant told the Associated Press that the series would go in a "very unexpected direction" which he called "as gripping as the first season." Chibnall said he mapped out the show's plot and characters on several whiteboards in his office. "You have to be very methodical," he said about plotting Broadchurch. "It's like a mathematical puzzle where you put all these blocks together and move them around for the most satisfying thing."

=== Casting ===
David Tennant, Olivia Colman, Andrew Buchan, Arthur Darvill, Jodie Whittaker, Charlotte Beaumont, Joe Sims, Carolyn Pickles, Jonathan Bailey, Pauline Quirke, Tanya Franks, Simone McAullay and Adam Wilson all returned for the second series. Neither Tennant nor Colman was contractually obliged to return. Without them, Chibnall said, "We would not have done it, absolutely. Luckily they wanted to come back because they weren't contracted to." New series two cast members include Marianne Jean-Baptiste, James D'Arcy, Eve Myles, Charlotte Rampling, Meera Syal, Phoebe Waller-Bridge, Amanda Drew, Shaun Dooley and Tom Rosenthal. Rampling plays Broadchurch resident Jocelyn Knight. It was near her home that Danny Latimer argued with the postman a week before his death. Myles plays Claire Ripley, Jean-Baptiste's character is Sharon Bishop and Waller-Bridge plays Abby Thompson.

=== Secrecy ===
Before broadcast, the plot of series two was closely guarded. Cast members were sworn to secrecy about the details and required to sign non-disclosure agreements. Actor Andrew Buchan said cast members were told little about the plot, except on a need-to-know basis as they prepared for their performances in each episode. Actor Joe Sims said that actors only receive two scripts at a time to ensure that they did not know where the plot was headed. Several different endings for series two were filmed.

In August 2014, Erin Kelly, author of a book adaptation of Broadchurch, said that writer Chris Chibnall inserted a one-line clue about Series 2 into her book three days before the book was due to begin printing. Kelly said the clue comes early in the novel. Although it does not spoil the plot, she said, it does provide a hint about it. The clue involved the argument the postman had with Danny Latimer. Jack Marshall identifies the location as being near Jocelyn Knight's home. On 19 December 2014, ITV revealed that Charlotte Rampling's character is named Jocelyn Knight.

=== Filming ===
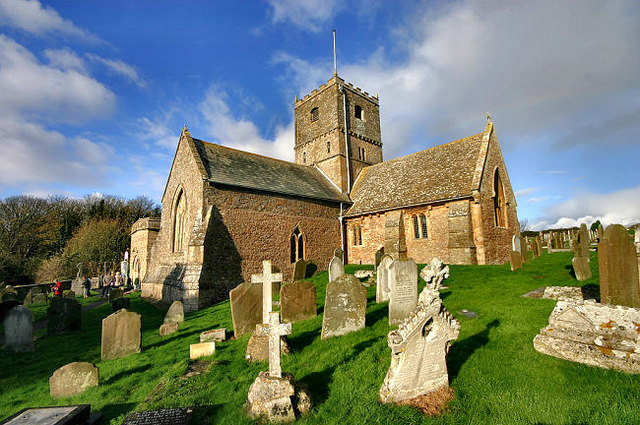
St Andrew's Church in Clevedon, Somerset as St Bede's, the Broadchurch parish church

The second series filmed under the code name "Tea and Sympathy" in Devon, Dorset, North Somerset, and Reading in Berkshire. A car park next to the West Bay Hotel in Bridport served as the production's base camp. Each episode took 12 and a half days to film. Filming began in late May 2014. Shooting has taken place outside the George Hotel in Bridport, at Munchees café in Reading, and at the Riverside Restaurant, Wynn's funfair, the seafront and The Lazy Lizard nightclub in Weymouth. A few scenes were shot on a beach between Freshwater Beach and East Beach in West Bay. St Andrew's Church in Clevedon has been used to depict the Broadchurch parish church and graveyard. Other Clevedon filming locations include Marshall's Field and Hill Road and the house used to represent the Latimer family home in Lavington Close. The Forum building on the campus of the University of Exeter was used to represent the Wessex police station, while another campus structure served as a local courtroom. Some filming occurred in Bracknell Forest, in particular the Jennett's Park suburb and the John Nike Leisuresport Complex in Bracknell. The shopping district in Bracknell was decorated to mimic the Christmas holidays for filming.

The production team was criticised by the West Bay coastguards in June 2014 for filming too close to the edge of East Cliff at West Bay, Dorset. Severe weather and recent rock slides left the cliffs unstable and a coastguard volunteer said the production team should have used stakes, safety lines, harnesses and helmets. A spokesperson for the Broadchurch production defended the film crew, noting that the production team had received all necessary filming permits, had visited the site numerous times to ensure safety and taken other reasonable health and safety precautions.

James Strong, who directed five of the eight episodes in series one, directed the first two episodes of series two. Jane Featherstone and Chris Chibnall continued as executive producers, with Chibnall acting as lead writer again.

Filming for series two of Broadchurch concluded the night of 12 October 2014. Final scenes were shot at the village of Eype in Dorset.

=== Promotion and broadcast ===
On 9 November 2014, two 20-second teaser trailers began airing on ITV, each titled "The End Is Where It Begins". On 16 November 2014, a third 20-second teaser trailer aired on ITV, in two versions, voiced by characters Alec Hardy and Ellie Miller, respectively. These were also titled "The End Is Where It Begins". A fourth, series two trailer was released on 11 December. Old Faces, a song written and performed by Laura Doggett, featured on the trailers.

The first episode aired on 5 January 2015, on ITV in the UK and TV3 in Ireland. The Canadian TV channel Showcase and TV One in New Zealand both debuted series two on 11 January 2015. In Australia, the ABC first aired on 15 February 2015 while BBC America aired the second series in the United States beginning on 4 March 2015. (Note: BBC America had originally set the premiere date for 4 February 2014. But nine days later, the cable channel delayed the series two an additional month without comment.)

== Series 3 ==
On 1 December 2014, a number of media outlets reported that ITV had commissioned a third series of Broadchurch. Later that day, ITV denied that a third series had yet been commissioned.

ITV confirmed that Broadchurch, as well as Tennant and Colman, would return for a third series immediately after the series two finale on 23 February 2015, repeating the use of "Broadchurch will return" after the closing credits.

In February 2016, Olivia Colman gave an interview on This Morning where she stated that the final series would be shot in May 2016 and said that she did not yet know anything about the plot.

On 12 April 2016, ITV officially announced the casting for the third and final series, with Jodie Whittaker, Andrew Buchan, Arthur Darvill, Carolyn Pickles and Adam Wilson returning. Filming for the third series began in May 2016 and broadcast started on 27 February 2017. Miller and Hardy investigate a serious sexual assault. Creator Chris Chibnall said, "We have one last story to tell, featuring both familiar faces and new characters. I hope it's a compelling and emotional farewell to a world and show that means so much to me."

== Critical reception ==
Critical response of Broadchurch
Season	Rotten Tomatoes	Metacritic
1	94% (36 reviews)	91 (30 reviews)
2	84% (31 reviews)	73 (18 reviews)
3	98% (43 reviews)	85 (14 reviews)

Series one of Broadchurch won critical acclaim. On Rotten Tomatoes, the first series has an approval rating of 94% based on 36 reviews, with an average rating of 8.7/10. The site's critical consensus reads "Well written and beautifully shot, Broadchurch is a deliberate, slowly unfolding mystery procedural with terrific performances from a fine cast." Metacritic gives the first series a weighted average score of 91 out of 100, based on 30 reviews, indicating "universal acclaim". Radio Times named it the best television series of 2013, and Entertainment Weekly called it "a bona fide national obsession" in the UK.

The second series received "generally favorable reviews", with a weighted average score of 73 out of 100 based on 18 critics, according to Metacritic. It has an approval rating of 87% based on 30 reviews and an average score of 7.95/10, on Rotten Tomatoes. The critical consensus reads "Season two of Broadchurch builds on its predecessor's intrigue, with the added bonus of new characters who mesh well with the existing cast."

Series three was met with critical acclaim. Metacritic rated it 85/100 based on 14 reviews, indicating "universal acclaim", while Rotten Tomatoes gave it an approval rating of 98% and an average score of 7.8/10, based on 43 reviews. The site's critical consensus reads "In its final season, Broadchurch establishes a high standard for police procedurals to come, combining socially conscious themes with suspenseful mystery and a pair of compelling leads."

== Ratings ==
The first episode of Broadchurch series one was seen by an average of 9.1 million viewers (31 percent audience share). This included 6.15 million live viewers (25.2 percent audience share), with another 716,000 viewers (4.4 percent) on time-delayed viewing via digital video recorder, timeshifted channels (+1) and similar media and technologies. This was the best premiere episode of a weekday new drama series in the United Kingdom since ITV's Whitechapel debuted in January 2009. Broadchurch attracted an average weekly audience of 7.1 million "live" viewers during its run. After accounting for time-delayed viewing, Broadchurch averaged 9.2 million viewers per episode. An average of 8.4 million viewers (33 percent audience share) watched the final episode of Broadchurch. About 8.8 million viewers tuned in at the start of the show and a peak of 9.3 million viewers saw the murderer revealed. But only 7.9 million viewers remained with the episode after the reveal.

Broadchurch series one was not a rating success in all countries, however. When it aired on BBC America in the United States, ratings were negligible. American consumption of the series on iTunes, Amazon.com and other streaming video sites was also small.

The premiere episode of series two drew an average of 7.3 million viewers. for a 30.1 percent share on 5 January 2015. An average of 300,000 viewers watched it on ITV+1 an hour later. The episode opened with 6.8 million viewers at 9 pm and ended with 8.7 million viewers (with a peak viewership of 8.9 million). Broadchurch was the second-most-watched programme of the evening, with the most-watched being Coronation Street (which had a peak audience of 8.3 million). The series two premiere drew 800,000 (28.1 percent) more viewers than the series one premiere and was 22.6 percent higher than average ITV viewership (5.2 million) in the same time-slot over the past 12 months. The consolidated rating made this episode the highest rated drama episode on ITV in 2015.

But ratings dropped significantly afterward. Viewership for the second episode fell to just 6.11 million viewers (a 22.4 percent share) after accounting for ITV+1 viewership. That was the lowest overnight viewership rating for the series since episode five of series one. It was still good enough to win its timeslot, however. Overnight ratings dropped again for the third episode to just 5.2 million viewers, the lowest for any episode of the series. Overnight viewership dropped again for episode four, reaching a low of 5.6 million viewers. However, the series still won its timeslot, beating Silent Witness.

== Awards ==
Broadchurch series one was nominated for seven BAFTA awards. Olivia Colman won Best Actress, David Bradley won Best Supporting Actor and the show won Best Drama Series. The show competed for the BAFTA Audience Award, but lost to "The Day of the Doctor" (Doctor Who), which Tennant also starred in. At the BAFTA Craft Awards, Ólafur Arnalds won Best Original Television Music, while James Strong was nominated for Best Director-Fiction for "Episode One", Mike Jones was nominated for Best Editing-Fiction for "Episode Eight", Catrin Meredydd as nominated for Best Production Design and Chris Chibnall was nominated for Best Writer-Drama.

Broadchurch series one was also nominated for and won many additional awards, including honours at the Freesat Awards, TV Choice Awards, National TV Awards, Broadcast Awards, Broadcasting Press Guild Television and Radio Awards and the Royal Television Society Awards. It also won a Peabody Award for its distinguished and meritorious contributions to excellence in quality television.

Broadchurch series three won the award for best Crime Drama at National Television Awards in early 2018. This was the first year the award was presented and Broadchurch was competing against Sherlock, Line of Duty and Little Boy Blue. Julie Hesmondhalgh was nominated for the BAFTA Award for Best Actress in a Supporting Role but lost to Vanessa Kirby from The Crown.

== Adaptations ==
In early 2014, the Fox Broadcasting Company in the United States announced that it had licensed the rights to Broadchurch and would produce a U.S. version of the series, named Gracepoint. The Fox series, also starring David Tennant, was created and written by Chris Chibnall and directed by James Strong. Fox specifically said Gracepoint would have a different ending from Broadchurch. Gracepoint began airing on 2 October 2014. Following very low ratings, Gracepoint was not renewed for a second season.

The French channel France 2, on which Broadchurch aired in February 2014, also announced an adaptation. The French series, produced in association with Shine France, was titled Malaterra and was directed by Jean-Xavier de Lestrade.

The Slovak channel Markíza adapted two series of Broadchurch in 2025 under the name Vina (Guilt) with Tomáš Maštalír and Gabriela Marcinková in leading roles.

== Bibliography ==
- ITV (6 February 2013). "Broadchurch: A new drama for ITV" (PDF). Archived from the original (PDF) on 4 March 2016.
- Millerson, Gerald; Owens, Jim (2012). Television Production. New York: CRC Press. ISBN 9781136038907.
- West Dorset District Council (2013). The Official Broadchurch Guide (PDF) (Report). Archived from the original (PDF) on 29 November 2014.
