= Divided Kingdom =

2005 novel by Rupert Thomson

- First edition
- Author: Rupert Thomson
- Cover artist: Chip Kidd
- Language: English
- Genre: Picaresque novel
- Publisher: Bloomsbury
- Publication date: 2005
- Publication place: United Kingdom
- Media type: Print (Hardback & Paperback)
- Pages: 396 pp
- ISBN: 1-4000-7659-5
- OCLC: 71201950

Divided Kingdom is a novel by British author Rupert Thomson. It was first published in Britain by Bloomsbury in April 2005 and then in the United States by Alfred A. Knopf in June 2005.

== Introduction ==
The former United Kingdom has been divided into four Quarters: Green (Scotland, the North-East of England and East Anglia); Red (the East Midlands, the North-West of England and Northern Ireland); Blue (Wales and the West Country) and Yellow (the West Midlands), each allocated a different personality type. Each of these personality types is based upon a different Humor: Sanguine is blood, Choleric is yellow bile, Phlegmatic is phlegm and Melancholic is black bile. Each country has a different way of running things: for example, the Blue Quarter uses canals, and the Yellow Quarter is industrious. No one is allowed to go from quarter to quarter; there are walls with barbed wire and armed guards.

The protagonist is Thomas Parry, a government official for the Sanguines. He attends a conference in the Blue Quarter and visits a club called the Bathysphere where he sees his life as it was before the division. This inspires him to go on a journey across all the quarters to find out about his past.

== Plot summary ==
The story begins with Parry's younger self being whisked away from his bed and his family in the dead of night and loaded into a van occupied with others in the same situation. From there the story continues in Thorpe Hall, a place best described as a hostel for those yet to be arranged into their defining humor. Whilst staying at the Hall, the protagonist and his young companions begin to learn of their fate and of the 'Rearrangement'. Following a short time in the hall, the four humors are explained to the children, Sanguine, Phlegmatic, Choleric and Melancholic.

Shortly after, the protagonist is taken to see Mr. Reek, one of the teachers at Thorpe Hall. He is told that he will be moved to a new location where he will be integrated into a new family suited to a person of his type. He is also given his name, Thomas Parry, which is used for the majority of the remaining story. After a time, Thomas is transported via train to his new home where he meets his new father and sister, Victor and Marie Parry. During the remainder of his childhood, Thomas settles into his new environment easily, adopting the Sanguine attitude and persona.

With his childhood drawing to a close, Thomas goes to attend university witnessing the slow deterioration of his adopted family as life after the rearrangement which took their mother/wife away from them wears them down. Towards the end of his time at university, Thomas is approached by Diana Bilal, an employee of the ministry of health and social security. She informs Thomas that he had been watched for some time and were interested in employing him as a trainee assessment officer. Thomas is initially reluctant to take her up on the offer, knowing that his adopted family would be disappointed as it was the ministry who they blamed for the loss of their mother and wife. Thomas is won over and accepts the job when Diana tells him that his family need not know of his true occupation and that they would be granted immunity from ever being rearranged again.

Shortly after joining the Ministry, Thomas gets his first experience of participating in a rearrangement when a young girl is to be moved from sanguine territory (the red quarter) to choleric (the yellow quarter). During his time as an observer to the rearrangement, he gets his first view of a border gate, a complex of high concrete walls, barbed wire and minefields patrolled by border guards.

After gaining his first view of the 'nuts and bolts' of the job, Thomas is visited by the head of the ministry of relocation Mr. Vishram. Upon being asked if he was available for lunch, Thomas agrees to meet the man the following day when Vishram would reveal Thomas's next job. The next day, Vishram takes Thomas to a small restaurant in the heart of the red light district to discuss an upcoming conference that Thomas would be attending. It is revealed that the conference was to be held in the Blue quarter. Realizing the chance to discover something entirely new and exciting, Thomas duly accepts.

A few days later, Thomas finds himself stepping off of a train and into the Blue quarter, typified by its many canal systems that weave their way through the metropolis. As he walks through the city to get to his hotel, he is stopped by a man who forces a small leaflet into his hand saying you may find this interesting. Thomas then goes to the Sheraton and later meets Walter Ming, a mysterious character who asks Thomas if he's going to the "Bathysphere", which appears at first to be a club. Thomas then goes to the Bathysphere and a very confusing scene occurs. Thomas opens a pale gold door and suddenly he has a flashback of his entire life. After these flashbacks, his view of the Divided Kingdom has changed.

The guests attending the conference at the Blue Quarter are moved into the Yellow Quarter for reasons that are not quite clear, possibly because it is Rearrangement Day. During the night a bomb goes off in the hotel and Thomas escapes determined to go back to the Bathysphere.

== Characters ==
- Thomas Parry - protagonist
- Victor Parry - Thomas's adoptive father, a railroad engineer for the Red Quarter.
- Marie Parry - Thomas's adoptive sister, whom he has a crush on.
- Mr Vishram - Thomas's boss at the Department of Transfer and Relocation.
- Fay Mackenzie - a Yellow Quarter rebel.
- Walter Ming - a mysterious Blue Quarter agent who led Thomas to the Bathysphere.
- The White People - a mysterious race of free roaming people who appear to be able to speak telepathically and don't belong to any Quarter.
- Odell - Thomas's saviour, later discovered to be his 'shadow'. has command of a strange 'power' which allows her to 'ride the wind'.
