= Revelations =

Revelations may refer to:

== Books and comics ==
- Révélation$, a 2001 book by Denis Robert and Ernest Backes concerning banking giant Clearstream

=== Literature ===
- Revelations, a 1972 novel by Barry N. Malzberg
- Revelations, a 1985 novella by Clive Barker, featured in the collection Books of Blood: Volume IV
- Revelations, a 1992 novel by Sophy Burnham
- Revelations, a 1997 short story anthology edited by Douglas E. Winter
- Revelations, a 2001 novel by Melinda Metz, the sixth installment in the Fingerprints series
- Revelations, a 2003 novel by Cheris Hodges
- Revelations, a 2008 novel by Melissa de la Cruz, the third installment in the Blue Bloods series
- Revelations, a 2011 novel by Mongane Wally Serote
- Assassin's Creed: Revelations, a 2011 novel based on the eponymous video game by Anton Gill
- Animal III: Revelations, a 2014 novel by K'wan Foye, the third installment in the Animal series

=== Comics ===
- Wildstorm: Revelations, a comic book limited series
- "Spider-Man: Revelations", a comic book event
- Revelations (comics), a comic book series by Dark Horse Comics

== Television ==
- Revelations (1994 TV series), a 1994 UK late-night soap
- Revelations (2005 TV series), a 2005 American event series starring Bill Pullman that aired on NBC
- Revelations – The Initial Journey, a 2002 New Zealand drama series

=== Episodes ===
- "Revelations" (Babylon 5)
- "Revelations" (Daredevil)
- "Revelations" (Dead Zone)
- "Revelations" (Ōban Star-Racers)
- "Revelations" (Sanctuary)
- "Revelations" (Sliders)
- "Revelations" (Stargate SG-1)
- "Revelations" (Third Watch)
- "Revelations" (The X-Files)

== Film ==
- Revelations (2016 film), 2016 Indian drama film
- Revelations (2025 film), 2025 South Korean thriller film
- Paradise Lost 2: Revelations, a 2000 documentary film
- Star Wars: Revelations, a 2005 Star Wars fan film
- Revelations Entertainment, an American independent movie production company

== Music and dance ==
- Revelations (Alvin Ailey), signature choreographic work of Alvin Ailey American Dance Theater
- The Revelations, British-based pop/soul girl group
- The Revelations featuring Tre Williams

=== Albums ===
- Revelations (Audioslave album) or the title song (see below), 2006
- Revelations (Fields of the Nephilim album), 1993
- Revelations (Gene album), 1999
- Revelations (Killing Joke album), 1982
- Revelations (McCoy Tyner album), 1988
- Revelations (mind.in.a.box album), 2012
- Revelations (Red Jezebel album), 2004
- Revelations (Special Ed album), 1995
- Revelations (Vader album), 2002
- Revelations (Wynonna Judd album), 1996
- Revelations, a 1999 EP by Hefner

=== Songs ===
- "Revelations" (Audioslave song), 2007
- "Revelations", by Santana song from Festival, 1977
- "Revelations", by Circle II Circle from Burden of Truth, 2006
- "Revelations", by the Crimson Armada from Guardians, 2009
- "Revelations", by Downthesun from Downthesun, 2002
- "Revelations", by DragonForce from Valley of the Damned, 2003
- "Revelations", by Hed PE from Blackout, 2003
- "Revelations", by Iron Maiden from Piece of Mind, 1983
- "Revelations", by Judas Priest from Nostradamus, 2008

== Video games ==
- Revelations: The Demon Slayer, Game Boy Color RPG
- Revelations: Persona, PlayStation RPG
- Assassin's Creed: Revelations, a game in the Assassin's Creed franchise
- Prince of Persia: Warrior Within, ported to PlayStation Portable as Prince of Persia: Revelations
- Resident Evil: Revelations, a game in the Resident Evil franchise for the Nintendo 3DS
- EVE Online: Revelations, two expansions of the MMORPG Eve Online
- Revelations, Call of Duty: Black Ops III Zombies map

== See also ==
- Revelation (disambiguation)
- The Revelation
