= The Revelation =

The Revelation may refer to:

- The Revelation (Rev Theory album)
- The Revelation, album by Root
- The Revelation (Daniel Amos album), 1986
- The Revelation (Coldrain album)
- The Revelation (Applegate novel), an Animorphs novel
- The Revelation (Little novel), a novel by Bentley Little
- The Revelation, television series episode of The Legend of Korra (season 1)

== See also ==
- Revelation (disambiguation)
- Revelations (disambiguation)
