= Soft! =

1998 novel by Rupert Thomson

- First edition cover
- Author: Rupert Thomson
- Publisher: Knopf
- Publication date: September 6, 1998
- ISBN: 0-375-40224-1

Soft! is a 1998 novel by British writer Rupert Thomson.

In the novel, the protagonists acting as participants in a sleep experiment and find themselves the unwitting word-of-mouth advertisers of 'Kwench!', a new soft drink.
