= Brett Krutzsch =

American academic (born 1979)

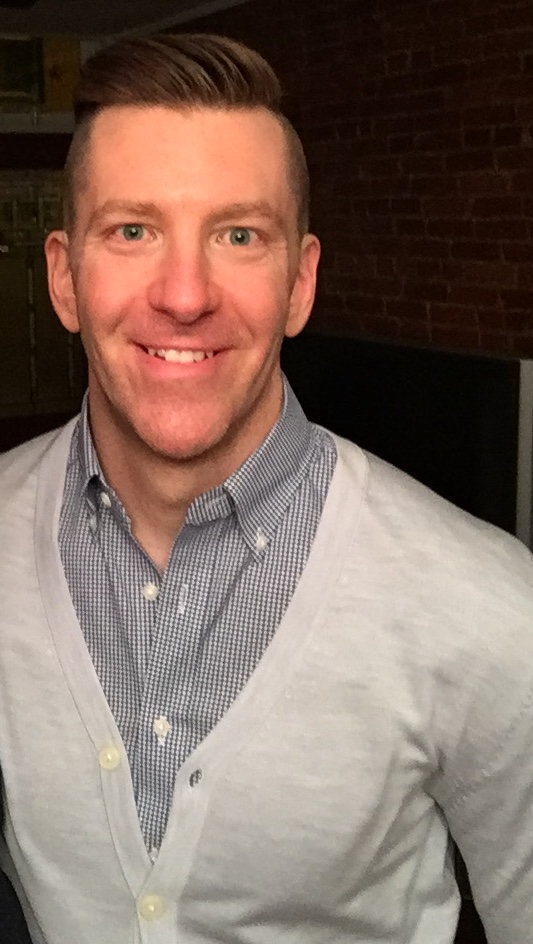
Brett Krutzsch

Brett Krutzsch (born September 17, 1979) is a scholar of religion at the Center for Religion and Media at New York University, where he serves as Editor of the online magazine The Revealer and teaches in NYU's Department of Religious Studies. He is the author of the 2019 book, Dying to Be Normal: Gay Martyrs and the Transformation of American Sexual Politics from Oxford University Press. His writing has appeared in the Washington Post, Newsday, The Advocate, and he has been featured on NPR.

== Education and personal life ==
Krutzsch received his B.A. from Emory University and M.A. from New York University. He earned his Ph.D. in religion from Temple University, studying under Rebecca Alpert. In 2013, Krutzsch married Kevin Williams. They live in Manhattan, New York.

== Career ==
Before he joined NYU's Center for Religion and Media in 2019, Krutzsch taught at Haverford College as a Visiting assistant professor of religion, and at the College of Wooster as the Walter D. Foss Visiting assistant professor of Religious Studies and Women's, Gender, and Sexuality Studies.

Krutzsch is an expert on LGBTQ history and religion in America. His first book, Dying to Be Normal: Gay Martyrs and the Transformation of American Sexual Politics, from Oxford University Press examines how religion shaped LGBTQ political action in the United States. The book explores how LGBTQ activists used the deaths of Matthew Shepard, Harvey Milk, Tyler Clementi, Brandon Teena, F.C. Martinez, campaigns like the It Gets Better Project, and national tragedies like the Pulse nightclub shooting for political purposes to promote assimilation. In 2020, Dying to Be Normal was named a Lambda Literary Award finalist for best LGBTQ nonfiction book of the year.

Krutzsch has published on religion and LGBTQ politics in several scholarly journals including American Jewish History,Theology and Sexuality, the Journal of Popular Culture, and Biblical Interpretation. In 2015, Krutzsch received the LGBTQ Religious History Award for his research and writing on Matthew Shepard.

His public work on religion and LGBTQ issues has been featured in the Washington Post, The Advocate, Medium, Indianapolis Star, NPR's "On Point," and on multiple podcasts, including the Radio GAG (Gays Against Guns) show and the Straight White American Jesus podcast. In 2019, Krutzsch was selected for the inaugural Sacred Writes public scholarship fellows program funded by the Henry R. Luce Foundation.

Along with Nora Rubel, Krutzsch is the co-editor of the book Blessings Beyond the Binary: Transparent and the Queer Jewish Family, published by Rutgers University Press in 2024. The book examines the show Transparent, its representation of American Jews and Judaism, the show's criticisms, and how it fits and diverges from early 21st century transgender and queer politics.

Since 2019, Krutzsch has been the Editor of The Revealer, an online magazine about religion and society published by the Center for Religion and Media at NYU. As Editor, he is also host of The Revealer podcast. In 2021, 2023, and 2025, the Religion News Association awarded The Revealer with "Excellence in Magazine Overall Religion Coverage," the organization's highest award for a religion magazine.
