= List of Broadchurch episodes =

Broadchurch is a British television crime drama programme broadcast on ITV. It was created and written by Chris Chibnall and produced by Kudos Film and Television, Shine America, and Imaginary Friends. The first series focuses on the death of an 11-year-old boy and the impact of grief, mutual suspicion, and media attention on the town; it premiered on 4 March 2013. The second series began its ITV broadcast on 5 January 2015. The third series was confirmed on 23 February 2015, immediately following the second series finale, and premiered on 27 February 2017, and concluded on 17 April 2017. During the course of the programme, 24 episodes of Broadchurch aired over three series.

== Series overview ==
Series	Episodes	Originally released		Average UK viewers (millions)
Series	Episodes	First released	Last released	Average UK viewers (millions)
1	8	4 March 2013	22 April 2013	9.37
2	8	5 January 2015	23 February 2015	9.68
3	8	27 February 2017	17 April 2017	10.75

== Episodes ==
=== Series 1 (2013) ===
No. overall	Episode	Directed by	Written by	Original release date	UK viewers (millions)
1	Episode 1	James Strong	Chris Chibnall	4 March 2013	9.07
2	Episode 2	James Strong	Chris Chibnall	11 March 2013	9.01
3	Episode 3	Euros Lyn	Chris Chibnall	18 March 2013	9.65
4	Episode 4	Euros Lyn	Chris Chibnall	25 March 2013	9.42
5	Episode 5	Euros Lyn	Chris Chibnall	1 April 2013	8.81
6	Episode 6	James Strong	Louise Fox & Chris Chibnall	8 April 2013	8.95
7	Episode 7	James Strong	Chris Chibnall	15 April 2013	9.56
8	Episode 8	James Strong	Chris Chibnall	22 April 2013	10.47

=== Series 2 (2015) ===
No. overall	Episode	Directed by	Written by	Original release date	UK viewers (millions)
9	Episode 1	James Strong	Chris Chibnall	5 January 2015	11.34
10	Episode 2	James Strong	Chris Chibnall	12 January 2015	9.88
11	Episode 3	Jessica Hobbs	Chris Chibnall	19 January 2015	9.27
12	Episode 4	Jessica Hobbs	Chris Chibnall	26 January 2015	9.20
13	Episode 5	Jonathan Teplitzky	Chris Chibnall	2 February 2015	8.91
14	Episode 6	Jonathan Teplitzky	Chris Chibnall	9 February 2015	9.33
15	Episode 7	Mike Barker	Chris Chibnall	16 February 2015	9.33
16	Episode 8	Mike Barker	Chris Chibnall	23 February 2015	10.17

=== Series 3 (2017) ===
No. overall	Episode	Directed by	Written by	Original release date	UK viewers (millions)
17	Episode 1	Paul Andrew Williams	Chris Chibnall	27 February 2017	10.75
18	Episode 2	Paul Andrew Williams	Chris Chibnall	6 March 2017	10.76
19	Episode 3	Paul Andrew Williams	Chris Chibnall	13 March 2017	10.29
20	Episode 4	Daniel Nettheim	Chris Chibnall	20 March 2017	10.46
21	Episode 5	Daniel Nettheim	Chris Chibnall	27 March 2017	10.70
22	Episode 6	Lewis Arnold	Chris Chibnall	3 April 2017	10.57
23	Episode 7	Paul Andrew Williams	Chris Chibnall	10 April 2017	10.66
24	Episode 8	Paul Andrew Williams	Chris Chibnall	17 April 2017	11.61

== Viewership ==
Broadchurch : UK viewers per episode (millions)

Series	Episode number								Average
Series	1	2	3	4	5	6	7	8	Average
1	9.07	9.01	9.65	9.42	8.81	8.95	9.56	10.47	9.37
2	11.34	9.88	9.27	9.20	8.91	9.33	9.33	10.17	9.68
3	10.75	10.76	10.29	10.46	10.70	10.75	10.66	11.61	10.75

Audience measurement performed by Broadcasters' Audience Research Board
