= Aepytus (son of Hipothous) =

In Greek mythology, Aepytus (Ancient Greek: Αἴπυτος, romanized: Aíputos or Aípytos, lit. 'steep', 'high' or 'lofty') was a king of Arcadia and the son of Hippothous.

== Mythology ==
He was reigning at the time when Orestes, in consequence of an oracle, left Mycenae and settled in Arcadia. There was at Mantineia a sanctuary, which down to the latest time no mortal was ever allowed to enter. Aepytus disregarding the sacred custom crossed the threshold, but was immediately struck with blindness, and died soon after. He was succeeded by his son Cypselus and thus the great-grandfather of another Aepytus.
