= The Insult (novel) =

1996 novel by Rupert Thomson

- First edition
- Author: Rupert Thomson
- Language: English
- Genre: Novel
- Publisher: Bloomsbury
- Publication date: November 1996
- Publication place: United Kingdom
- Media type: Print
- Pages: 416 pp
- ISBN: 978-0-7475-2601-8
- OCLC: 60310496

The Insult is a 1996 novel by Rupert Thomson. The novel describes the life of Martin Blom, who is shot while walking to his car and consequently goes blind. While being treated in a clinic, he seemingly regains his vision, but only at night. While his doctors assure him he has Anton's syndrome, he believes adamantly in his ability to see, even going so far as to disguise it from others who think him still blind. The book is written as a first-person narrative.

The novel's title is a pun on the use of the word "insult" to describe traumatic brain injury and refers to the shock of losing one's sight as the ultimate insult.

== Reception ==
In her The New York Times review of the novel, Michiko Kakutani praised Thomson as talented and capable of writing beautifully, while calling The Insult a self-indulgent and incoherent novel. In 2009, The Guardian included The Insult on its "1000 novels everyone must read" list. David Bowie named The Insult one of his top 100 reads.

== Awards and nominations ==
- The Insult was shortlisted for the 1996 Guardian Fiction Prize.
