= Rupert Thomson =

English writer

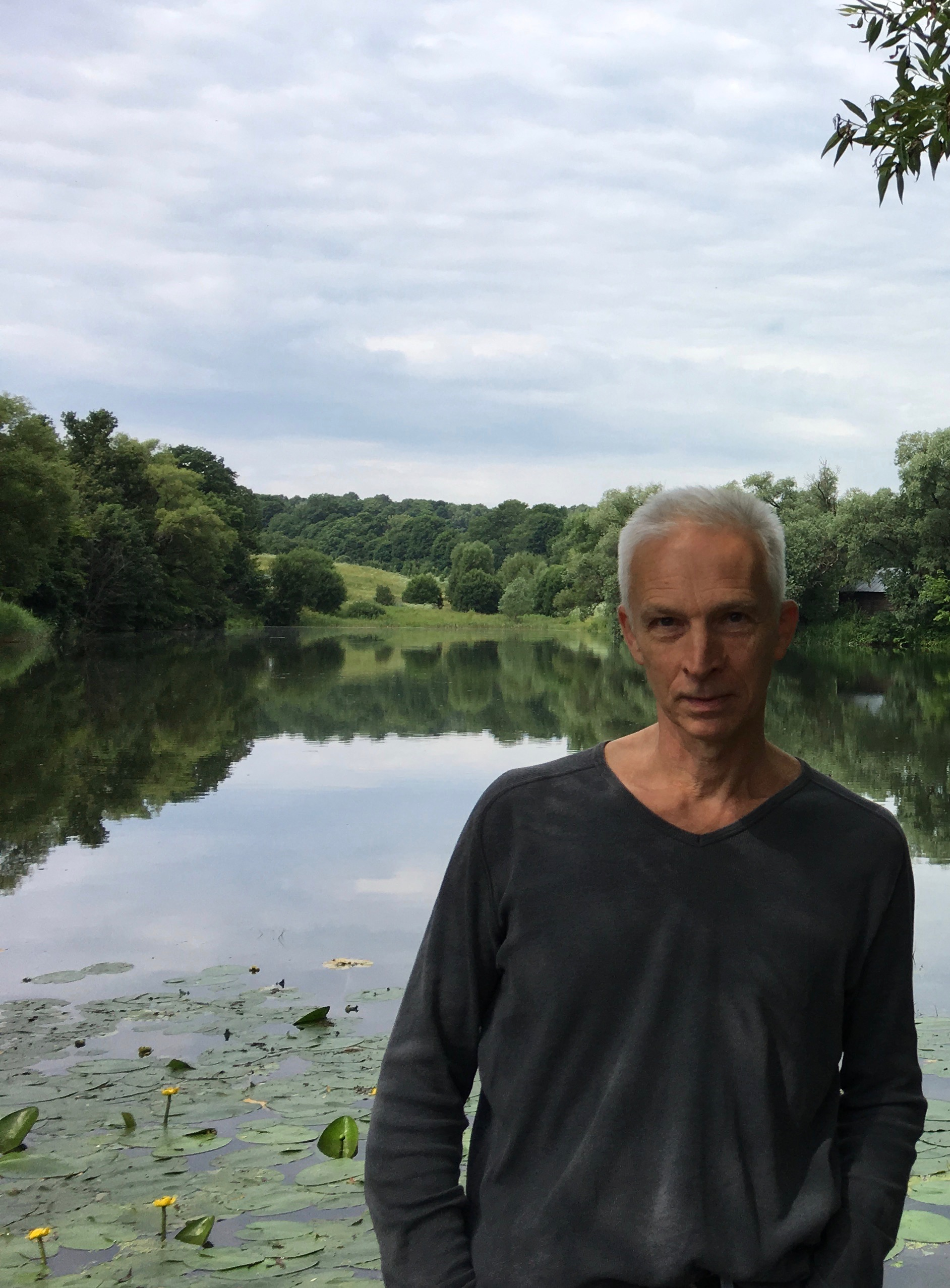
Rupert Thomson at Tolstoy's estate, Yasnaya Polyana, in July 2017

Rupert Thomson, FRSL (born 5 November 1955) is an English writer. He is the author of thirteen critically acclaimed novels and an award-winning memoir. He has lived in many cities around the world, including Athens, Berlin, New York, Sydney, Los Angeles, Amsterdam, Rome, Barcelona and London. He has contributed to the Financial Times, The Guardian, the London Review of Books, Granta and The Independent.

== Biography and literary career ==
=== Youth and education ===
Rupert Thomson was born in Eastbourne, East Sussex, on November 5, 1955, to Rodney Farquhar-Thomson, a War Disability Pensioner, and Wendy Gausden, a nurse. His mother died playing tennis when he was eight. From the age of ten, he attended public school Christ's Hospital, where he began to write poetry. His early influences were Thomas Hardy and T. S. Eliot. When he was fifteen, he rode his bicycle 150 miles on a "pilgrimage" to Hardy country. He was also influenced by a series called Penguin Modern European Poets – in particular, Eugenio Montale, Rainer Maria Rilke, Yevgeny Yevtushenko, Cesare Pavese and Zbigniew Herbert. In 1972 he was awarded an Exhibition to Sidney Sussex College, Cambridge to study Medieval History and Political Philosophy. While there, he published poems in several small magazines, including The Windless Orchard. He graduated as a Bachelor of Arts in 1976.

=== Early travels (1976–1977) ===
After leaving university, Thomson flew to New York. He has stated that there were cultural reasons behind choosing America as a destination, since it was linked with artists as diverse as David Bowie and Alexander Trocchi. Thomson spent six weeks living in Hell's Kitchen with a 63-year-old alcoholic and his family.

Afterwards, he travelled throughout the United States, principally by Greyhound bus. He also visited Vancouver and the Canadian Rockies, and travelled through Mexico. Thomson returned to Eastbourne in November of that year and worked in the Birds Eye factory. In January 1977 he left again – this time for Athens.

Once in Athens, Thomson rented a flat on Iliados Street and made a living by teaching English. He began work on a novel. He met W. H. Auden's secretary, Alan Ansen, who read his poetry and gave him encouragement. Thomson completed a 160-page first draft of a novel, but it was never finished.

=== Working in London (1978–1982) ===
In 1978 Thomson moved to London and found a job as a copywriter. He was employed by Robin Wight's Euro Advertising. Later, he worked for FCB (Foote, Cone and Belding). While working in advertising, he kept notebooks and wrote 50-word short stories.

After four years in advertising, he gave up his job, moved a friend into his South London council flat, and set off for Italy in his Vauxhall Viva. From then onwards, he devoted himself to writing.

=== Seeing the world (1982–2000) ===
In November 1982, Thomson took a job as winter caretaker of a converted Tuscan farmhouse that belonged to Miriam Margolyes. In the Italian countryside that winter, he wrote the first draft of a book that would become Dreams of Leaving:

There was no heating in the house, and I worked in the kitchen, huddled against a free-standing gas stove. I typed on sheets of yellow foolscap, using a maroon Olympia portable I had inherited from my last agency. I was disciplined about the hours I put in: I would start at three in the afternoon and finish at one in the morning. The routine felt natural, comfortable, even seductive.

The following year, he moved to West Berlin, where he rented an apartment on Sanderstrasse in Kreuzberg and continued to work on the novel he had started in Italy. He was on the point of taking up a job as a cleaner in the Olympiastadion when his father died.

He returned to Eastbourne in February 1984. The seven months Thomson spent with his brothers in the house where he grew up would provide the inspiration for his award-winning 2010 memoir, This Party's Got to Stop.

At the end of the year he moved to New York, where he worked at the Strand Bookstore, running the outdoor bookstall in Bryant Park. In the summer of 1985 Thomson moved to Japan, inspired by his grandfather who lived there for more than thirty years. He spent several months in Tokyo, redrafting his first novel. By 1986, he was back in London.

Dreams of Leaving was picked up by Liz Calder and published by Bloomsbury in June 1987. It prompted the New Statesman to say: "When someone writes as well as Thomson does, it's a wonder other people bother", while Nicholas Lezard of The Guardian called it "one of the most haunting, resonant and clever parables about England you'll ever read". One of Thomson's fan letters came from Budgie, the drummer of Souxsie and the Banshees.

Three months after publication, Thomson flew to Sydney. While there, he received a phone-call from a film production company in Los Angeles, optioning Dreams of Leaving. He spent two summers in West Hollywood, writing an adaptation of his novel. The film was never made, but he was paid $50,000 for the screenplay, which financed his second novel, The Five Gates of Hell. This was followed by four more novels – Air and Fire (1993), The Insult (1996), Soft! (1998) and The Book of Revelation (1999).

In 1999, he and his girlfriend, Katharine Norbury, began trying to conceive via in vitro fertilisation. Their daughter, Eva Rae, was born in 2000.

=== Up north (2000–2004) ===
In the spring of 2000, Thomson moved to a village in Cheshire to be close to his father-in-law, who was dying of cancer. While up north, Thomson wrote in a caravan, which he towed into an orchard next to the cottage where he was living. He was working on the book that would become Divided Kingdom.

Following a review in The New York Times, Thomson received more than a dozen faxes from film-makers and film producers all over the world, including William Friedkin, wanting to option The Book of Revelation . He sold the rights to Australian writer/director Ana Kokkinos. The film of The Book of Revelation was released in 2006.

=== The Barcelona years (2004–2010) ===
In 2004, Thomson moved to Barcelona, renting a house in Sarrià. A year later, he married his long-term girlfriend, Katharine Norbury, in Las Vegas. While in Barcelona, he published two novels, Divided Kingdom (2005) and Death of a Murderer (2007), which was shortlisted for the Costa Novel of the Year. He also ventured into non-fiction for the first time, with a memoir called This Party's Got to Stop (2010). "An extraordinary memoir," wrote Hisham Matar, "one of the best I have read in recent years", while Hilary Mantel thought it was "very funny", and Robert Macfarlane called it "completely brilliant, spikily funny, very dark, and beautifully constructed". A Book of the Year in The Independent, The Guardian, Time Out, the New Statesman, and The Telegraph, Thomson's memoir went on to win the Writers' Guild Non-Fiction Book of the Year.

=== Return to London (2010) ===
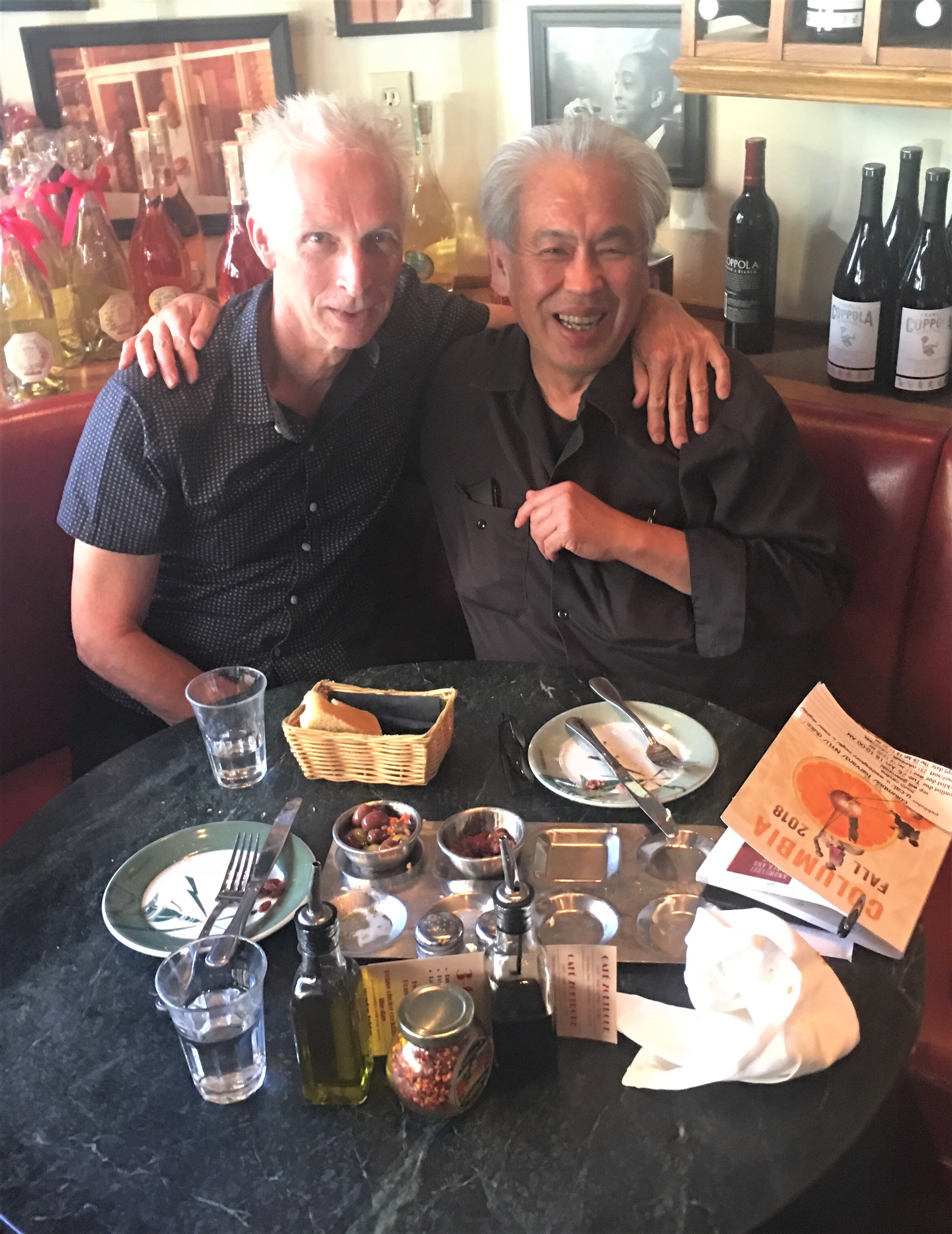
Rupert Thomson with Paul Yamazaki of "City Lights", June 2018

In 2010 the financial crash forced Thomson and his family to return to London. Three years later, in 2013, David Bowie selected The Insult as one of his 100 Must-Read Books of All Time. Thomson has stated that being chosen by Bowie felt like an affirmation:

I'm not a writer who has had much luck with prizes, but as Lionel Shriver said to me the other day, when we were talking about not being celebrated: "That Bowie accolade, though. No one can take that away from you." She paused. "You can take that to your grave."

That year, Thomson's ninth novel, Secrecy, received overwhelmingly positive reviews. Boyd Tonkin, in The Independent, wrote: "Thomson has merged the pulse and pace of a thumping narrative heartbeat with an eerie and visionary gift for mystery, puzzle, and surprise…Scene after scene trembles with breath-stopping tension on the edge of bliss or dread", while Stephanie Merritt called Thomson "a writer of exceptional skill, though his work has perhaps not been as widely celebrated as it deserves" and added "his finest novel to date: exquisitely crafted, and with the power to possess and unsettle the reader in equal measure".

Thomson's next novel, Katherine Carlyle (2015), was feted by writers and artists as diverse as Jonathan Lethem, Lionel Shriver, Samantha Morton, Richard Flanagan, Deborah Moggach, Anne Enright, James Salter, and KT Tunstall. "Katherine Carlyle is the strongest and most original novel I have read in a long time," Philip Pullman wrote. "It's a masterpiece."

In 2016, Thomson's short story "To William Burroughs, from His Wife" was shortlisted for the Costa Short Story of the Year Award.

Katherine Carlyle was followed by Never Anyone but You (2018), about the lives of Claude Cahun and Marcel Moore. It was described by Sarah Waters as "a novel of tremendous beauty…an astonishing accomplishment", and by Monica Ali as "nail-bitingly tense and unbearably moving". The novel was a Best Books of the Year choice in The Guardian, The Observer, and The Sydney Morning Herald, and was shortlisted for the American Library of Paris Book Award.

In 2020, at the suggestion of his publisher, Thomson published a new novel, NVK, under the pseudonym of Temple Drake, a name he borrowed from a character in William Faulkner's novel Sanctuary. NVK was an Amazon Best of the Month Pick, and a Top 10 Best Debut Novels of the Fall Pick from Apple. Thomson followed NVK with Barcelona Dreaming, which was published in 2021. Barcelona Dreaming received starred reviews in both Kirkus and Publishers Weekly, and was shortlisted for the Edward Stanford Fiction with a Sense of Place Award. Among the book's many admirers are Irenosen Okojie, Colm Tóibín, Andrea Wulf, Philip Pullman, Victoria Hislop, Maya C. Popa, DBC Pierre, Kitty Aldridge, and Gwendoline Riley.

Thomson has this to say about the creative process:

It's a headlong plunge into the unknown each time, with no framework, no plan, no end in sight…I'm trying to pin down some kind of psychological truth. I'm after an undertow – the flow of something fresh and unexpected. There's no need to be afraid, or even wary. No one will ever see my first attempt. I have a number of metaphors for how this process feels. I'm a sculptor with a piece of marble. I'm a driver on a motorway at night who turns his headlights off. I'm an actor, but without an audience. I chip away at something formless. I can't seem to remember any of my lines. I take wrong turnings, scenic routes. I get lost. I crash. But somehow I make progress. The marble gradually resolves itself into a shape. My characters slowly come alive. When day dawns and the road appears, I'm never where I thought I would be. The journey is always unpredictable. There is always risk, exhilaration, mystery, and panic. There is also, hopefully, the discovery of something that feels both recognisable and new.

He has never won any prizes for his fiction, and is often referred to by literary critics as having been criminally overlooked.

== Works ==
=== Novels ===
- 1987 – Dreams of Leaving
- 1991 – The Five Gates of Hell
- 1993 – Air and Fire
- 1996 – The Insult
- 1998 – Soft!
- 1999 – The Book of Revelation
- 2005 – Divided Kingdom
- 2007 – Death of a Murderer
- 2013 – Secrecy
- 2015 – Katherine Carlyle
- 2018 – Never Anyone but You
- 2020 – NVK (as Temple Drake)
- 2021 – Barcelona Dreaming
- 2023 - Dartmouth Park (UK title: How to Make a Bomb)

=== Memoir ===
- 2010 – This Party's Got to Stop

=== Short stories ===
- 1988 – "Look, The Monkey's Laughing"
- 1989 – "Other Things"
- 2014 – "To William Burroughs, from his Wife"

=== Essays and articles ===
- 2009 – The Lost Boy
- 2009 – Call Me by My Proper Name (Granta 107)
- 2010 – Park Life (Granta 110)
- 2011 – Truman Capote: an introduction to In Cold Blood
- 2013 – A life in writing by Nicholas Wroe
- 2013 – "Fugitive Pieces": Rupert Thomson on Gaetano Guilio Zumbo
- 2014 – Patrick Modiano: an appreciation of the winner of the Nobel Prize for Literature -
- 2015 – "In the Wilds of Industrial Russia for Research I Will Not Use": Rupert Thomson on researching Katherine Carlyle
- 2015 – James Salter: Write or Perish
- 2015 – Rupert Thomson: "My Fear of Becoming a Father"
- 2015 – Rupert Thomson discusses Katherine Carlyle with Max Liu
- 2016 – Rupert Thomson: On trauma, death, and the power of fiction versus non-fiction (Part One)
- 2016 – Rupert Thomson discusses his latest novel, Katherine Carlyle (Part Two)
- 2018 – David Bowie: How my novel ended up on Bowie's Must-Read list
- 2019 – Rupert Thomson: Books that made me
- 2020 – Flannery O'Connor: I even mis-spell intellectual
- 2020 – Rupert Thomson: Novels about Women on Their Own
- 2021 – "On loving – and leaving – Barcelona": Rupert Thomson on the writing of Barcelona Dreaming

== Bibliography ==
- Rupert Thomson – Critical Essays: foreword by Rupert Thomson, edited by Rebecca Pohl and Christoper Vardy

== Awards and distinctions ==
- Air and Fire: Shortlisted for the 1994 Writer's Guild Novel of the Year
- The Insult: Shortlisted for the 1996 Guardian Fiction Prize and chosen by David Bowie as one of his 100 Must-Read Books of All Time
- Death of a Murderer: Shortlisted for the 2009 Costa Novel of the Year
- This Party's Got to Stop: Winner of the 2010 Writer's Guild Non-Fiction Book of the Year
- Elected Fellow of the Royal Society of Literature in 2015
- To Williams Burroughs, from his Wife: Shortlisted for the 2015 Costa Short Story of the Year
- Never Anyone but You: Shortlisted for the 2018 American Library in Paris Book Award
- Barcelona Dreaming: Shortlisted for the 2022 Edward Stanford Fiction with a Sense of Place Award
