= Oedipus (Euripides) =

Lost play by Euripides

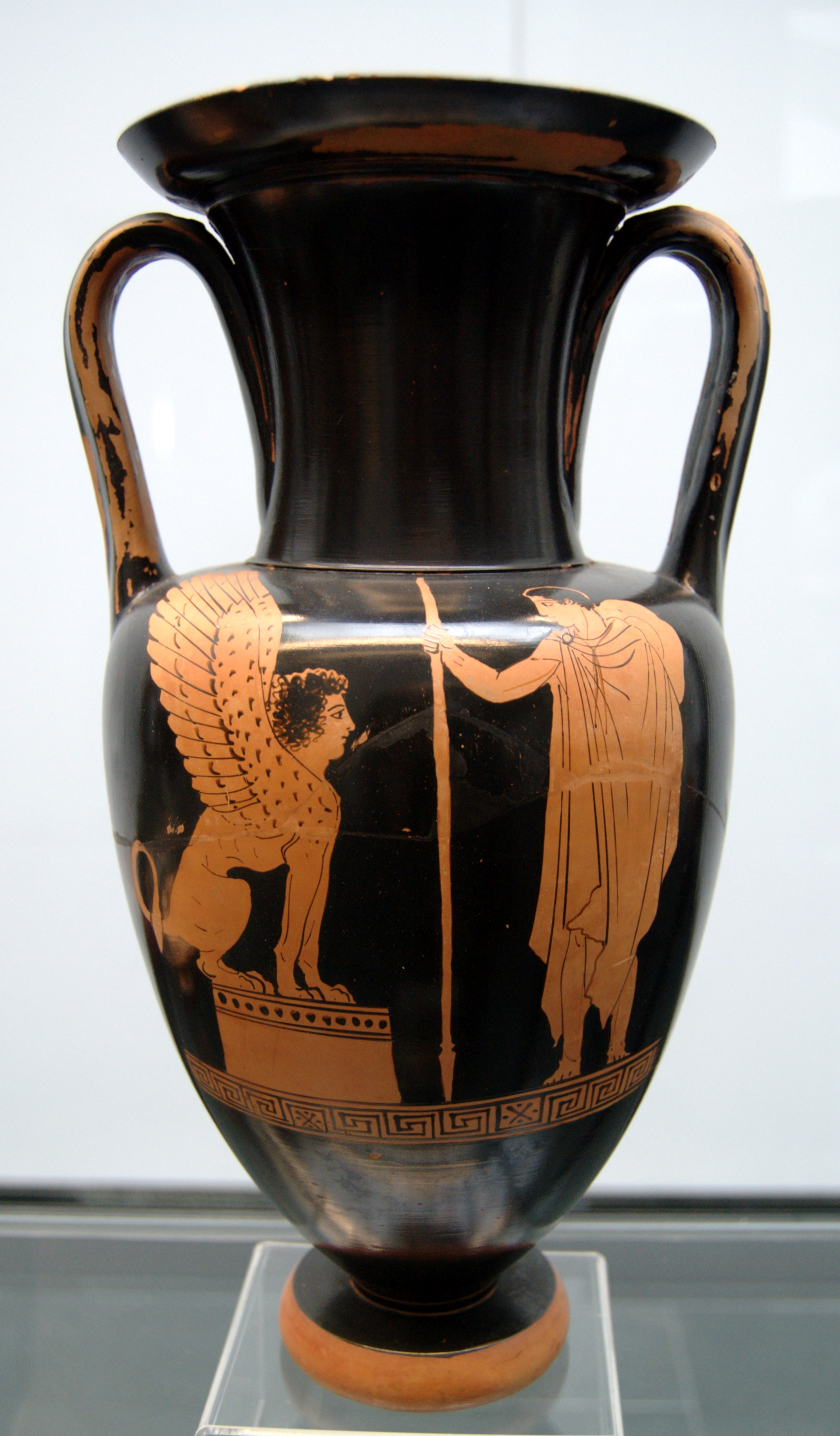
- Oedipus confronting the Sphinx
- Written by: Euripides
- Characters: Oedipus; Jocasta; Creon; Servant of Laius; Periboea, wife of Polybus? Menoetes?
- Original language: Ancient Greek
- Genre: Tragedy
- Setting: Thebes

Premiere
- Date premiered: Estimated between 415 and 406 BCE
- Place premiered: Athens

Oedipus (US: /ˈɛdɪpəs/ or UK: /ˈiːdɪpəs/; Ancient Greek: Οἰδίπους, Oidípous) is a play by the 5th-century BCE Athenian dramatist Euripides. The play is now lost except for some fragments. What survives of the play covers similar ground as Sophocles' acclaimed Oedipus Rex, but scholars and historians have found there are significant differences. In Oedipus Rex, the title character blinds himself upon learning his true parentage, accidentally killing his father and marrying his mother Jocasta. In Euripides' play, however, it appears Oedipus is blinded by a servant of his father Laius, Oedipus' predecessor as king of Thebes. Furthermore, Euripides' play implies Oedipus was blinded before it was known that Laius was his father. Also, while in Sophocles' play Jocasta kills herself, remaining fragments of Euripides' play depict Jocasta as having survived and accompanied Oedipus into exile.

== Fragments ==
A number of fragments of Oedipus and of ancient writings about Oedipus are extant. In one fragment, John Malalas writes that Euripides wrote a drama about Oedipus, Jocasta and the Sphinx. Another fragment (539a) gives the beginning of a hypothesis of the play, which states that Laius fathered a child despite the fact that the god Apollo forbade him from doing so. A papyrus fragment recently reconstituted from five smaller ones (540, 540a-d) describes the Sphinx preparing to pose her riddle, presumably to Oedipus in the confrontation in which Oedipus defeats her by answering the riddle correctly.

A key fragment (541) is spoken by a servant of Laius, boasting of blinding Oedipus. This fragment is translated by Collard and Cropp as "We pressed the son of Polybus to the ground, destroying his eyes and blinding him." An illustration on a 2nd-century BCE Etruscan alabaster urn might depict this scene. The illustration shows Oedipus held down as described in the fragment, watched by a figure holding a scepter, presumably his brother-in-law and uncle and eventual successor Creon. However, the illustration also shows Jocasta, who probably would not be at Oedipus' blinding in the play, and also shows Oedipus' children, whom we do not know were characters in the play at all.

Several fragments appear to involve the characters' reactions to the revelations in the play. It is not always clear who the speaker is, but in one fragment (549) Oedipus might be commenting on how much can change in a single day, and in another (554a) Creon apparently states his view that "a bad man should always be treated badly," and that he would violate sanctuary and risk the wrath of the gods in order to accomplish this. Several of these fragments have been ascribed to Jocasta. In one of these fragments (551), she notes that envy destroyed Oedipus, destroying her too. In at least two fragments (545 and 545a), Jocasta describes what a sensible wife should do, particularly serving and supporting her husband.

== Plot ==
It is clear from the fragments that Oedipus contained a description of Oedipus' defeating the Sphinx and his blinding by a servant of Laius. The context of the description of the defeat of the Sphinx is not universally agreed upon. Some scholars believe that the action of the play began with Oedipus defeating the Sphinx, and then moved quickly to the revelations that Oedipus killed the previous king Laius and then that Laius and Jocasta were Oedipus' biological parents.

In "Uberlegungen zum Oedipus des Euripides" (1990), Martin Hose suggested a reconstruction of the plot of Oedipus as follows. Oedipus' adoptive mother Periboea arrives in Thebes to tell him that his (adopted) father Polybus has died. Oedipus is as yet unaware that he is adopted, and believes Periboea and Polybus to be his biological parents. Oedipus proudly tells Periboea how he defeated the Sphinx, earning for himself the newly vacant throne of Thebes and marriage to Thebes' newly widowed queen Jocasta. Periboea arrived in Thebes in a chariot that Oedipus had sent her as a gift, which had belonged to the previous king Laius and which Laius was riding when he was killed. Laius' servants would have recognized the chariot, thus realizing that Oedipus was the killer of Laius, and blind him as punishment for the deed. Creon might have been involved in the blinding. As yet, it would not have been revealed that Oedipus was the biological son of Laius, and hence the fragment describing the blinding refers to Oedipus as the son of Polybus. The blind Oedipus has a scene with Jocasta and possibly Periboea in which the fact that his biological parents are Laius and Jocasta is revealed. Menoetes, another servant of Laius who had originally exposed Oedipus when he was born, might have played a role in this recognition scene as well. As a result of this revelation, Creon wants to exile Oedipus as further punishment, generating the later fragments. These include Jocasta's support for and sharing of moral responsibility with Oedipus and her accusing Creon of jealousy of Oedipus, which led to the catastrophe. Most scholars agree that the play ended with Jocasta joining Oedipus in exile.

== Date ==
The date for Oedipus has not been definitively established but metrical analysis on the extant fragments, particularly the incidence of resolutions by Cropp and Fick, indicates that the play was likely written in the latter part of Euripides' life, between 419 BCE and 406 BCE, and most likely after 415 BCE.
