= The Book of Revelation (novel) =

2000 novel by Rupert Thomson

- First edition
- Author: Rupert Thomson
- Published: 2000
- Publisher: Bloomsbury Publishing
- Pages: 264

The Book of Revelation is a novel by UK author Rupert Thomson. The book was published in 2000 by Alfred A. Knopf and has 260 pages. The novel was unusual for its detailed descriptions of a non-statutory female-on-male rape.

The protagonist of the novel is a male ballet dancer living in Amsterdam with his French girlfriend Brigitte. One day he is drugged and abducted in an alley by three hooded women. They hold him prisoner in an abandoned warehouse for about two weeks. During the course of his incarceration he endeavours to keep his mind separate from the abuse that is systematically inflicted on his body (involving two of the women raping him).

In 2006 the book was made into a film by Ana Kokkinos. In the novel the narrator is never named explicitly. In the film adaptation the character is called "Daniel". Anna Torv, the actress who depicts his girlfriend (an Australian named Bridget in this version) also plays the role of one of his captors, although Kokkinos said that this had not been intended as more than a doubling-up. The audience is not supposed to see it as a suggestion that Bridget was one of Daniel's captors.
