= James Wilson (author) =

British author (1779–1846)

James Wilson (24 May 1779—16 July 1846) was a British blind furniture upholsterer and author who lived in Belfast. In 1820, he wrote the Biography of the Blind, which compiled a comprehensive history of blind people.

== Background ==
Wilson was born in Richmond, Virginia on 14 May 1779 to John Wilson and Elizabeth Johnson. Wilson's father was Scottish and following the outbreak of the American Revolutionary War he served under Charles Cornwallis. In 1781, Wilson's parents fled America through New York City, on a ship bound for Liverpool, UK. Wilson's father, already weakened from his time spent fighting the insurgency, died during the journey. Wilson's mother, who was pregnant with her second child, was so disturbed by her husband's death that she went into early labour and neither her nor the baby survived. Wilson, now an orphan, contracted smallpox and became blind as a result of the disease. Upon the ships landing in Belfast, Wilson was given into the care of a nurse, who was paid with money donated from fellow boat passengers. Together they had collected enough to support Wilson until he was old enough to earn his wage.

Wilson's right eye was couched by a surgeon in Belfast, allowing him to see nearby objects and their colours. But, aged seven, he lost all remaining eyesight when a cow trampled him. Despite his blindness, Wilson learned to navigate around his neighbourhood by zig zagging across streets, to map out the boundaries of the roads. Wilson was hired by local businesses as a messenger boy and walked up to 40 miles (64 km) delivering letters and newspapers.

In 1801 he entered Belfast Asylum for the Blind where he was trained as an upholsterer. On 27 November 1802 he married and had 11 children, but only four lived to adulthood. A keen reader, Wilson would ask others to read aloud to him. But he was unable to find any books about blindness, he began writing his own.

Published in 1820, the Biography of the Blind profiled the achievements of a variety of blind people including Nicholas Saunderson, Homer, and Anna Williams. Wilson released further expanded editions of the Biography of the Blind throughout his life, promoting it throughout the UK. These further editions included an autobiography, as well as additional biographies of other blind people.

On 16 July 1846, Wilson died while visiting the Isle of Wight on a book promotion trip.

== Publications ==
- Poems and Songs, on Various Subjects (1810)
- A Collection of Ancient and Modern Scottish Ballads, Tales, and Songs.... (1815)
- Biography of the Blind (1820)
