= The Revealer =

Online magazine

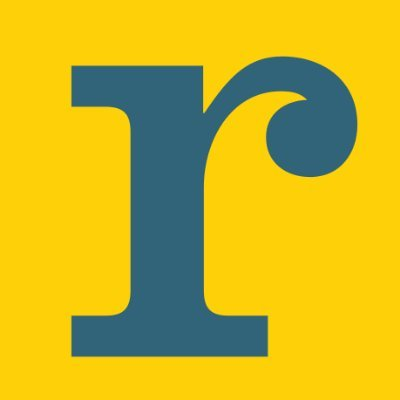
- Website type: Online magazine
- Available in: English
- Editor: Brett Krutzsch
- Parent: Center for Religion and Media at New York University
- Website: therevealer.org
- Commercial: No
- Launched: 2003; 23 years ago

The Revealer: A Review of Religion and Media is an online magazine published by the Center for Religion and Media at New York University. The Revealer publishes ten issues per year and features articles that explore religion and its many roles in society, politics, the media, and in people's lives.

== History and focus ==
NYU Journalism professor Jay Rosen developed the idea for The Revealer as a project for NYU's Center for Religion and Media, one of ten Centers of Excellence initially funded by The Pew Charitable Trusts and that Angela Zito and Faye Ginsburg founded in 2003. Jeff Sharlet and Kathryn Joyce created The Revealer's website in 2003. Sharlet served as editor of the publication for five years before becoming a bestselling author with his book The Family: The Secret Fundamentalism at the Heart of American Power. In 2010, Ann Neumann assumed the position of editor, a title she kept until 2013. Kali Handelman was editor from 2013 to 2019, and Brett Krutzsch became the magazine's editor in 2019.

With articles written for a broad audience, The Revealer features original articles by scholars, journalists, and freelance writers that explore how religion shapes, and is shaped by, race, sexuality, gender, politics, history, and culture. The online magazine publishes articles in many forms, including feature essays with original research and on-the-ground reporting, first person narratives, opinion pieces, interviews, photo-essays, and reviews of books, film, and television.

== Current publication ==
Since 2013, The Revealer has published ten issues a year, with a new issue coming out every month except January and July. Each issue covers a wide range of topics related to religion and its role in society, with the exception of yearly "special issues" that focus on a single topic. A special issue in 2024 explored "The Threat of Christian Nationalism," one in 2022 explored "Trans Lives and Religion," and a special issue in 2020 explored "Religion and Sex Abuse."

In 2020, the magazine launched the Revealer Podcast. Since then, the Revealer podcast releases eleven episodes a year. Episodes have covered such topics as “Ex-Evangelicals and U.S. Politics,” “Religion’s Role in Russia’s Invasion of Ukraine,” “Jewish Comedy,” and “Faith-Based Prisons in the United States.” In 2021, the Religion News Association named it a finalist for best religion podcast.

In 2021, 2023, and 2025 the Religion News Association awarded The Revealer with "Excellence in Magazine Overall Religion Coverage," the organization's highest prize for a print or online religion magazine.

== See also ==
- Reveal (disambiguation)
