= Revealer (film) =

2022 film directed by Luke Boyce

- Promotional release poster
- Directed by: Luke Boyce
- Written by: Luke Boyce; Michael Moreci; Tim Seeley
- Starring: Caito Aase; Shaina Schrooten
- Production companies: The Line Film Company; Shatterglass Films
- Distributed by: Shudder
- Release date: April 29, 2022
- Running time: 86 minutes
- Country: United States
- Language: English

Revealer is a 2022 American horror film directed by Luke Boyce, starring Caito Aase and Shaina Schrooten.

== Premise ==
Angie, a stripper, has a run-in with a Christian proselytizer named Sally. As an apocalyptic event comes to pass, Angie and Sally find themselves stuck with each other and must find a way to survive.

== Cast ==
- Caito Aase as Angie Pitarelli
- Shaina Schrooten as Sally Mewbourne
- Bishop Ali Stevens as Ray
- Phil Bogdan as Asmodeus
- Buzz Leer as Wallace
- Samuel DelPurgatorio as David

== Release ==
Revealer was screened in the United States in 2022 as part of Panic Fest. The film is distributed by Shudder.

== Reception ==
On the review aggregator website Rotten Tomatoes, 78% of 9 critics' reviews are positive.

Matt Donato of Paste gave the film a mostly positive review, praising the performances of Aase and Schrooten, though writing that the film "never meets the fullest potential of its premise". Mary Beth McAndrews of Dread Central gave the film 3.5 stars out of 5, likewise praising the central performances and calling it a "stunning example of pandemic filmmaking and what can be accomplished with limited resources."
