= The Revealers =

2003 novel by Doug Wilhelm

- Author: Doug Wilhelm
- Publisher: Farrar, Straus and Giroux
- Publication date: October 7, 2003
- ISBN: 0-374-36255-6

The Revealers is a 2003 teen's novel by American author Doug Wilhelm about bullying in middle school.

== Plot summary ==
Russell Trainor always seems to get picked on at school. He is an only child and lives with his mom. Nobody talks to him, nobody likes him, he's a nobody. Until one day, Richie Tucker, one of the 8th graders at his school, starts to follow and threaten him, to the point where he punches Russell and pours root-beer over his head. Russell seeks advice from the school's most-picked-on boy, Elliot Gekowicz. Elliot has a passion for dinosaurs. He relates most topics to dinosaurs. Elliot and Russell soon become friends with a Filipino girl called Catalina, who receives horrible notes from the popular girls especially queen bee Bethany DeMere. After a rude note that the girls sent, Elliot and Russell want to do something. Later that day, Elliot is angered by some bullies on the way home and instead of not fighting back, Elliot throws punches and ends up getting hung off the bridge. Underneath him there is a waterfall, a river, and some sharp rocks. Elliot spits at one of the bullies and ends up accidentally getting thrown off of the bridge and into the shallow water. He ends up getting a minor concussion and a badly sprained ankle.

Meanwhile, Catalina writes up a letter about her story and coming to the U.S. She sends that to Elliot and Russell. They decide to send this to the seventh grade to show what Catalina is experiencing. With a teachers help they figure out a way using the school's internet service, KidNet. Then after a response, Elliot writes a story about him. Then people start sending their stories which are told to the seventh-graders and eventually the whole school, to form The Bully Lab. The site's purpose is to talk about any events of bullying a person may have witnessed or suffered. It turns into "The Revealers" and soon, dozens of affected kids confess their stories to The Revealers to show how bad this conflict has become in middle schools all over. However, the popular student Bethany sends The Revealers a false report and the principal, who's being threatened with being sued by Bethany's father, ends up shutting down the bully lab and KidNet. Then Russell, Catalina, and Elliot, think of an idea to show to the science fair. It is a simulator to show different scenarios of bullying. They also take different surveys and reports. Thanks to this idea, Bethany's scam is foiled and they win the science fair.

== Sequel ==
In March 2012, a sequel was released, titled True Shoes.
