= Reveal (narrative) =

Plot device where audience gains previously unseen information

The reveal (also known as the big reveal) is a plot device in narrative structure and is the exposure to the reader or audience of a previously unseen key character, or element of plot or performance.

A reveal is different from Aristotle's anagnorisis, in which something is revealed to a character rather than to the audience.

== Narrative ==
The reveal may result in a plot twist and could be the key plot turn or unexpected coda in the story; for example, in the mystery genre. It may have scenes in the future that reveal consequences of actions to provide a lead for what will occur in the plot or side plot. This may be the overarching plot line in a mystery or soap opera. It may also be used as a device (particularly in the climax) in stage magic by an illusionist or escape artist.

== Stage magic ==
In a magician's act, "the reveal" may refer to

- the normal culmination of a trick
- the unexpected (to the audience) culmination of the trick
- an explanation of the trick, which itself may be immediately eclipsed by a version of the trick that the first reveal can't explain.

== Film ==
Reveal is also used for two distinct cinematographic techniques:

- A slow, theatrically presented image of an important character or item not seen previously in the film;
- A close-up, wide shot, or other unusual camera point-of-view that shows the audience an important visual clue not known to characters in the same scene.

In the sense of first-time showing of a character, a reveal is similar to, but usually not the same as, the opening shot or Establishing shot that gives the location or context of a new scene.
