= List of Misfits episodes =

Misfits is a British science fiction comedy-drama television show, on the network Channel 4, about a group of young offenders sentenced to work in a community service programme, where they obtain supernatural powers after a strange electrical storm. The show premiered on 12 November 2009 and concluded on 11 December 2013 after its fifth series.

== Series overview ==
Series	Episodes	Originally released	
Series	Episodes	First released	Last released
1	6	12 November 2009	17 December 2009
2	7	11 November 2010	19 December 2010
3	8	30 October 2011	18 December 2011
4	8	28 October 2012	16 December 2012
5	8	23 October 2013	11 December 2013

== Episodes ==
=== Series 1 (2009) ===
No. overall	No. in series	Title	Directed by	Written by	Original release date	UK viewers (millions)
1	1	"Episode One"	Tom Green	Howard Overman	12 November 2009	0.787
Nathan, Kelly, Curtis, Alisha, Simon and Gary are a group of misfits who have nothing in common except for the 'Community Payback' scheme they have all been lumbered with at their local community centre, for various crimes and misdemeanours. When the group gets caught in a freak storm on the first day, some of them discover that they have superpowers. The storm also affects their probation worker, Tony, mutating him so he has super strength and a murderous hatred towards the "ASBO scum" he supervises. After murdering Gary he attacks the other Misfits. Kelly kills him in self-defence and they decide to bury Gary and Tony's corpses under a nearby flyover.
2	2	"Episode Two"	Tom Green	Howard Overman	19 November 2009	0.738
Nathan, Kelly, Curtis, Alisha and Simon are at an elderly home as a part of their probation. During a dance for the elderly, Nathan meets and falls for Ruth, a beautiful young volunteer (who is in fact an 83-year-old woman who, thanks to the storm, managed to become her young self again). Curtis and Alisha continue their flirting, while Simon meets a mysterious girl on the internet; "Shygirl18", who shows an interest in his videos (especially the video of the storm that gave the Misfits their powers). Meanwhile, the whole group is threatened, as someone has started leaving messages in their lockers: somebody else knows what happened to the probation officer.
3	3	"Episode Three"	Tom Harper	Howard Overman	26 November 2009	0.680
Alisha is partying as usual, using her power to gain sexual influence over boys. However, the one man she really wants is Curtis, and he is wary of her power. Meanwhile, Simon's online relationship with "Shygirl18" blossoms, but it is revealed that she is actually Sally, the new probation worker and the deceased Tony's fiancée, who suspects that the Misfits are involved in his disappearance.
4	4	"Episode Four"	Tom Green	Howard Overman	3 December 2009	0.710
Curtis is confronted by his ex-girlfriend Sam, who accuses him of having ruined her life - the two of them were caught with cocaine at a local nightclub and she went to jail for six months. Curtis' superpower causes him to turn back time to attempt to make the relationship work out. The episode ends with Sally searching the lockers of the Misfits, finding Tony's credit card in Simon's jean pocket.
5	5	"Episode Five"	Tom Harper	Howard Overman	10 December 2009	0.670
Nathan falls victim to the storm-based mental powers of Finn, a nine-month-old baby being raised by a single mother, who succeeds in making Nathan act as his father. Kelly determines what is happening and convinces Finn's mother to contact Finn's real father, assuring her that he will want to pursue his fatherly duties as soon as he sees Finn. Sally pursues a fake relationship with Simon to try to find evidence that the Misfits are responsible for Tony's suspected death. As she discovers a video on Simon's phone showing the Misfits' role in Tony's death, Simon fights Sally for possession of the phone and accidentally kills her when he throws her against a door.
6	6	"Episode Six"	Tom Harper	Howard Overman	17 December 2009	0.660
The gang notice that local youths have strangely stopped getting drunk, taking drugs, or having sex. Apparently, this is caused by a cult-like organisation called "Virtue", run by Rachel, a mysterious girl with a commanding storm-based power of suggestion. Nathan confronts Rachel with a gun, while invisible Simon appears on the rooftop and pushes her over the side. Although her death lifts her influence over everyone, she manages to partially grab hold of Nathan who also falls and is impaled on the iron fence below. The episode ends with Nathan regaining consciousness in his coffin, overjoyed upon discovering his power is immortality, when he realises that he is buried alive. This episode also introduces "Superhoodie", an enigmatic figure in a hoodie on a BMX bike whose significance will be revealed in series 2.

=== Series 2 (2010) ===
The events of Series 2 commence immediately after the end of Series 1. Filming took place in May 2010 and the second series began airing in November 2010.

No. overall	No. in series	Title	Directed by	Written by	Original release date	UK viewers (millions)
7	1	"Episode One"	Tom Green	Howard Overman	11 November 2010	1.42
With Sally presumed missing, a new probation worker named Shaun takes over her duties. The group dump Sally's body in the lake. Superhoodie is shown to be tracking the Misfits. Unknown to them, he steers them to Nathan's grave where Kelly hears Nathan's thoughts and the group dig him up. An art therapy class for the mentally ill is taking place in the community centre and one of the patients, Lucy, appears to be obsessed with Simon. Lucy has the ability to shape-shift, causing a lot of confusion between the group as she morphs into most of their forms and attempts to drive them away from Simon, with whom she has a history.
8	2	"Episode Two"	Tom Green	Howard Overman	18 November 2010	1.31
A stranger turns up and claims to be Nathan's half brother, Jamie; the main plot of the episode follows Jamie and Nathan tracking down their father and reconciling their rift. The group goes to a party where Jamie gives everyone a pill that effects their powers making their powers the opposite. Simon becomes the center of attention. Kelly say her every thought. When people touch Alisha they hate her. Curtis goes to the future, in which he is standing on a rooftop dressed as a superhero and begins kissing an unfamiliar young woman Nikki. Jamie is killed in a fire but Nathan can still see him because Nathan’s immortal. Simon finding out where Superhoodie lives. (Nikki) with whom Curtis seems to have a relationship - it turns out that Superhoodie's apartment belongs to her.
9	3	"Episode Three"	Tom Green	Howard Overman	25 November 2010	1.37
The group are left to tidy up a rubbish tip by their indifferent probation worker. After work, Alisha is saved from a mugging by the mysterious Superhoodie, who can touch her skin without being affected by her power. Overwhelmed with curiosity, Alisha finds out Superhoodie's real identity - he is Simon from the future and he tells her they will one day fall in love. Confused and scared, she doesn't tell the rest of the Misfits. Meanwhile, Curtis goes to visit the woman from the rooftop, Nikki, but the encounter goes badly. Nathan and Simon accompany Kelly to the tattoo parlour, where Nathan's jibes annoy Vince, the tattoo artist, who, it turns out, has a power of his own. Vince can give people tattoos and whatever is on the tattoo happens to the person with it. Consequently, he makes Nathan fall in love with Simon.
10	4	"Episode Four"	Owen Harris	Howard Overman	2 December 2010	1.42
The group are joined on their community service by a boy named Ollie, who reveals that he can teleport. While out picking up litter, they are accosted by a seemingly deranged man called Tim who believes he is the protagonist of a violent video game, seeking revenge against a crime boss named Conti, who has supposedly stolen his money. The Misfits play the video game, and conclude that if they follow its plot, the game will end and Tim will leave them alone. Future Simon is killed in the confrontation, telling Alisha as he dies that it is Alisha falling in love with him that makes present Simon become him in the future.
11	5	"Episode Five"	Owen Harris	Howard Overman	9 December 2010	1.43
Nathan accidentally walks in on a girl (Jessica) changing in the locker room. Suddenly, the lights go out and Nathan is brutally beaten to death, but survives due to his power of immortality. Later, Jessica and Simon strike up a relationship despite Nathan's warnings, making Alisha jealous. Kelly meets Bruno, a man who was changed a great deal by the storm because he used to be a gorilla.
12	6	"Episode Six"	Owen Harris	Howard Overman	16 December 2010	1.59
On the day of the storm, a cafe worker named Brian who is unsatisfied with his day job of serving people milk and cheese, is struck and granted the ability to manipulate dairy products. After perfecting it, Brian wastes no time in revealing his power to the world, and he becomes an instant celebrity. Shaun, the group's probation worker, tells the media about the gang, and before long there are cameras and reporters gathered outside the community centre. Other people with powers start to go public. Daisy has the power to cure any disease, injury or disability. Brian begins to feel resentment and rejection, as public interest in him is lost in favour of the others and their superior powers, and uses his power to kill, killing the whole gang apart from Curtis, who rewinds time to before Brian reveals his power to the world, successfully killing him before he reveals his powers. Meanwhile, Simon finally discovers from Alisha the truth about his and their future, and the gang finally complete their community service.
13	7	"Christmas Special (Episode Seven)"	Tom Harper	Howard Overman	19 December 2010	1.70
Three months have passed since the previous episode. Nathan meets and falls in love with Marnie, who is heavily pregnant. Alisha meets Seth, a man who has the ability to remove and harness powers, although he cannot use them himself, just buy and sell them. Desperate to get rid of her own power, Alisha lets Seth take her power for free, and when she tells the others, they all agree to sell their powers for £20,000 each (except for Nathan, who sold his for £1,000). A disillusioned vicar named Elliot waits alone at the community centre as no visitors turn up for his preaching session. He buys the power to walk on water from Seth to pose as a resurrected Jesus, conning money out of his new followers to buy more powers with (namely telekinesis and Alisha's power of seduction). One follower, Luke, robs the bar where Curtis is now working. Nathan, forgetting that he has sold his powers, goads Luke into shooting him, but ducks when Simon reminds him that he is no longer immortal. Luke fires the gun and the bullet hits Nikki instead, killing her. Her death makes the gang realise how important their powers are to them. They defeat Elliot and take his money so that they can buy back their powers from Seth, who offers to sell them whatever powers he has left. Kelly volunteers to go first, and the series ends as Seth gives her a power.

=== Series 3 (2011) ===
The third series of Misfits began airing on 30 October 2011 with the first of eight episodes. Robert Sheehan, who played Nathan in the first two series of the show, does not appear in the third series. His exit is shown in an online film that was released on the official Misfits website on 15 September, shortly before the third series airs. The online film is set in Las Vegas, Nevada, United States. A new character called Rudy is introduced in the first episode to replace Nathan, played by Joseph Gilgun.

No. overall	No. in series	Title	Directed by	Written by	Original release date	UK viewers (millions)
–	–	"Vegas Baby!"	Jonathan van Tulleken	Howard Overman	15 September 2011	N/A
Nathan, along with Marnie and her baby, arrive in Las Vegas with a new superpower that allows him to perform "reality warping" that wins him a fortune at the casino. After winning hundreds of thousands in craps, Nathan gets caught cheating and is arrested. At the local jail, he attempts to speak to Simon with one free phone call. However, the new character, Rudy, answers the phone instead and then hangs up. Nathan is last seen being dragged away by a guard towards a cell, yelling, 'Save me, Barry!'. Note: Final appearance of Nathan
14	1	"Episode One"	Wayne Che Yip and Alex García López	Howard Overman	30 October 2011	1.79
Each member of the gang has acquired new powers following the events of series 2; Simon can glimpse into the future, Kelly has complete knowledge of rocket science, Alisha has a form of clairvoyance which allows her to see what other people are doing, and Curtis can change his sex at will. They meet Rudy, who has the power of having a double (who seems to be his more sensitive side) and has a penchant for anal sex with his girlfriend Charlie. The gang is confronted by community server newcomer; unstable girl Tanya who has the ability to freeze everyone around her and threatens to kill Rudy and Alisha. Later on, Rudy and the gang are caught with a stolen car, sending them all back to community service, where Shaun is now very focused on their rehabilitation.
15	2	"Episode Two"	Wayne Che Yip and Alex García López	Howard Overman	6 November 2011	1.63
Curtis bypasses his ban on athletics by competing in his female form "Mel". While in his female form he meets Emma, a fellow athlete on whom he starts to develop a crush. Emma starts developing a sexual interest in Curtis's alter ego, so Curtis keeps seeing Emma in his female form. Back at the community centre, the gang confronts Mel as Kelly thinks she and Simon are having a secret affair and they all later find out "Mel" is in fact Curtis in his female form. Emma finds out and Curtis explains his power to change his sex so he could compete in athletics and they make up.
16	3	"Episode Three"	Will Sinclair	Howard Overman	13 November 2011	1.50
Simon, dressed as Superhoodie, stops the mugging of a comic book fan named Peter. He ends up doing community service with the Misfits for stealing a hand bag, where Peter and Simon then start bonding over their common interest in comic books. Peter starts controlling Simon's life, as his drawings become reality, and makes Simon break up with Alisha. When Simon realises this, he finds a note saying that Alisha has been abducted and runs to the warehouse only to find her tied up by another man in a superhoodie costume, who turns out to be Peter (after Simon kills him).
17	4	"Episode Four"	Wayne Che Yip & Alex García López	Howard Overman	20 November 2011	1.44
A Jewish man who has Curtis's old power from the first two series attempts to go back in time to kill Hitler. Hitler overpowers the old man, who returns to the present just as his mobile phone falls out of his pocket, allowing the Nazis to develop better technology and win the war. In the present, the Nazis have invaded Britain and are using Seth to scan for people with powers, whose powers are then given to high-ranking Nazis. The group of Misfits start working together, attacking the Nazis and saving Seth, as Kelly rewinds time back to normal.
18	5	"Episode Five"	Will Sinclair	Story by : Jon Brown & Howard Overman; Teleplay by : Jon Brown	27 November 2011	1.30
In the midst of her community service, Kelly switches bodies with Jen, a coma patient who utilises Kelly's body to escape the hospital and reconcile with her former boyfriend. The gang starts to notice when Kelly hardly turns up for Community Service and does not bother anymore with Seth. Jen is finally caught and the gang drag Jen's coma-induced body (in which Kelly is trapped) to the Community Centre. Seth manages to convince Jen to swap back and Jen's boyfriend turns off her life support.
19	6	"Episode Six"	Jonathan van Tulleken	Story by : Jon Brown & Howard Overman; Teleplay by : Jon Brown	4 December 2011	1.50
Rudy awakens from a one-night stand with a woman who has the power to give people super powered STDs, horrified that he has now contracted it. Curtis's power is causing uncontrollable sex swaps and ends up permanently stuck in female form, realising that he is pregnant from using the same tissue after masturbating as different sexes. After learning his lesson and making a speech, the woman who gave Rudy the STD is touched by what he said and removes it. Meanwhile, Seth finds the power of resurrection and puts it into Curtis after removing his power to bring him back to male form.
–	–	"Erazer"	Al Mackay	Chris Coghill	4 December 2011	N/A
Erazer, the resident artist whose graffiti takes on a life of its own, drops Rudy into a parallel universe where Suzy, a girl Erazer claims to love, is kept against her will. The misfits follow Erazer, looking to rescue Rudy who wastes no time using his charms on Suzy.
20	7	"Episode Seven"	Will Sinclair	Howard Overman	11 December 2011	1.46
After Seth's goading, Curtis uses his new resurrection power to bring Seth's dead ex-girlfriend, Shannon, back to life. However, it turns out that the new power has unexpected consequences when Shannon develops a taste for blood. Curtis also brings back a dead cat that ends up infecting its owner as well as a group of cheerleaders. As the Misfits battle on the horde of zombies, Seth has to choose between Kelly and killing his zombie ex-girlfriend Shannon. The episode ends with them realising that the zombie cat is still on the loose.
21	8	"Episode Eight"	Jonathan van Tulleken	Howard Overman	18 December 2011	1.50
A medium in the community centre brings several ghosts back to life. The first two probation officers come back, as well as Rachel, who brainwashed the community into becoming evangelical Christians in the season 1 finale, and believe they all have some "unfinished business" to complete before they are able to "move on". Alisha ends up dying and Simon informs the rest of the gang that he is Superhoodie. In order to go back in time to save Alisha, Simon obtains a new power from Seth, but is unable to return to the future. Simon travels in time to the start of the sixth episode of series one, and goes to Seth to buy the power of immunity, thus making him able to touch Alisha, and cause her to fall in love with him.

=== Series 4 (2012) ===
Misfits was renewed for a fourth season on 16 December 2011. On 20 December 2011, Antonia Thomas announced via Twitter that she would not be returning for the fourth series: 'I won't be coming back for series 4 but I can't wait to see it! I've had an amazing time in Misfits- it has been epic!'. On 20 December 2011, Iwan Rheon also announced through Facebook that he would not be returning for the fourth series.

No. overall	No. in series	Title	Directed by	Written by	Original release date	UK viewers (millions)
22	1	"Episode One"	Nirpal Bhogal	Howard Overman	28 October 2012	1.016
New community service members, Finn and Jess, join the team and sees Rudy, Seth, and Curtis fight against each other as they obsessively search for Michael's missing briefcase full of money. It is revealed that Michael who stole the briefcase was overcome by greed and killed his partner in crime. He was then struck by the storm, which made anyone who touched him gain an intense, murderous sense of greed for the case. The gang also meet their new probation worker - Greg, a strict man with anger management issues. Finn is shown talking to Sadie, who is bound and gagged in his flat.
23	2	"Episode Two"	Nirpal Bhogal	Howard Overman	4 November 2012	0.827
Looking for a new place, Rudy moves into Finn's flat and ends up releasing Sadie. Finn tells the others that he only had her tied up because she was controlling him with her vocal power to turn him into the perfect boyfriend. After Seth takes her power away, Rudy and Finn are kicked out of Sadie's flat and move into the community centre. Lola, a new trainee probation worker, is introduced and becomes interested in Curtis. Jess is immediately attracted to new bartender Alex, but Curtis warns her that he might be gay as he always rejects girls.
24	3	"Episode Three"	Nirpal Bhogal	Howard Overman	11 November 2012	0.727
Rudy Three is introduced as he is released from jail, having been sent there by Rudys One and Two, and now traps those two Rudys inside him. He obsessively stalks Jess and she confides in him; revealing her dark past involving a former eating disorder and a suicide attempt. Rudy Three attempts to murder Jess, stating that he has always wondered what it would be like to kill someone. When Jess stabs him, he agrees to free Rudys One and Two before dying. Curtis becomes the subject of Lola's sexual advances, Alex's aversion to girls is still unexplained after he refuses Jess' invitation. Finn reluctantly becomes briefly sexually involved with his former stepmother, which leads to an argument where his dad reveals that he is not his actual father.
25	4	"Episode Four"	Jonathan van Tulleken	Howard Overman	18 November 2012	0.678
When Lola tells Curtis that she's been hit by her ex-boyfriend, Curtis goes to the man's house and accidentally kills him. After resurrecting the ex-boyfriend for more information, Curtis gets bit and ends up turning into a zombie. Lola turns out to be an actress and the storm caused her to become her character - a misandrist sociopath who uses men. Zombie Curtis bites Lola's neck in retaliation and shoots her before she becomes one of the undead. Rudy calls Curtis in an attempt to work out some alternative arrangement, but Curtis says that there is only one way out and proceeds to shoot himself in the head.
26	5	"Episode Five"	Jonathan van Tulleken	Howard Overman	25 November 2012	0.760
After discovering his father adopted him and tracking down a man, Roger who believes he's not his father due to the fact that his biological mother's nickname is "Anal Mary", and meeting Dan, learning that Dan is dying of cancer and that Finn's half-sister, Grace, is keeping Dan alive with her power. Finn finds out that pain-wracked Dan wants to die now that Grace has Finn to look after her, and the two talk Grace into letting him go. Jess is invited to Alex's place where he proves his heterosexuality by kissing her. Later Alex corners a man in an alleyway and forces him to show him his penis.
27	6	"Episode Six"	Jonathan van Tulleken	Jon Brown	2 December 2012	0.732
Finn, Rudy, Jess and Alex go to one of Rudy's mate's, Richard Saunders, infamous wild house parties. Richard's power, combined with hallucinogenic drugs, causes him to materialise a giant killer rabbit with a golf club. As the gang enter the party, the number of people they have slept with appears on their forehead, with Finn proud of his "1" and Rudy anxious to find the right girl for his "100". Rudy meets Nadine at a wake elsewhere in the building and finds himself truly in love for the first time, but she leaves promptly at 11 o'clock and leaves Rudy feeling empty. The giant rabbit drags Jess down the basement and captures the rest of the gang one by one, leaving party guest Abbey - a soon-to-be member of the community service gang - to kill it. Alex reveals that a transgender man used a storm power to swap his vagina for Alex's penis.
28	7	"Episode Seven"	Dusan Lazarevic	Jon Brown	9 December 2012	0.778
Abbey wakes up at the community centre with a hangover and encounters a very anxious expectant mother, Tara, who uses her power to transfer the foetus to Abbey. Nadine turns up at the community centre much to Rudy's surprise and after a brief conversation and kiss between the two of them, she runs off once again. The gang follows, and discover that Nadine is a nun. Alex sets off on a mission to recover his missing penis after receiving information on its whereabouts and finds the transgender man who stole it. Devastated that the thief won't give him back his penis, Alex turns the gun on himself, until the thief guiltily returns it to him. Tara returns to the community centre to ask for her baby back and Abbey reluctantly agrees. Abbey reveals to the gang that she has no memory of who she is, having picked Abbey Smith as her name.
29	8	"Episode Eight"	Dusan Lazarevic	Howard Overman	16 December 2012	0.840
Rudy visits Nadine at her convent to return her handbag that she left behind, but is told that they are no longer able to see each other. Nadine sneaks out to visit Rudy, but the nuns kidnap Nadine and lock her up in the convent so she cannot escape. The gang manages to break in and rescue Nadine, but realise that her power unconsciously summons the Four Horsemen of the Apocalypse when she is surrounded by discord. When the Horsemen nearly kill Alex, and the gang announce they will fight the Horsemen to protect her, Nadine sacrifices herself to make the Horsemen disappear. The season ends with a cliff hanger depicting Alex about to receive an organ donation that might have a power.

=== Series 5 (2013) ===
No. overall	No. in series	Title	Directed by	Written by	Original release date	UK viewers (millions)
30	1	"Episode One"	William McGregor	Howard Overman	23 October 2013	0.804
Alex recovers in hospital after a lung transplant and is confronted by a woman who informs him that, as his new lung comes from a super powered individual, he now has the ability to remove the powers of others through sexual intercourse. The woman wishes for Alex to have sex with her, as the storm has made her unnaturally accident prone. Finn is attacked by a group of scouts who turn out to be agents of Satan and is later possessed after killing the leader. He then possesses everyone excluding Alex, who manages to knock Finn out and remove his satanic power via anal sex, releasing the others of the demonic presence. Meanwhile, Rudy Two attends a super-power support group led by an old woman who can tell the future through knitting. She knits a jumper for Rudy Two that foretells the transformation of the community service group into superheroes ("the superhero jumper").
31	2	"Episode Two"	William McGregor	Howard Overman	30 October 2013	0.582
Rudy sees his father kissing another woman but is unable to confront his father about it until the woman turns up missing. Rudy discovers that his father was also affected by the storm, and developed a power similar to Rudy's own. All of his father's negative attributes split off from him and formed a new person, the man Rudy saw kissing the other woman. The cruel duplicate of Rudy's father threatens to beat Rudy and his mother, but the two are saved by Jess. Abbey finds a discarded scarf and is entranced by its smell. She eventually manages to find the owner of the scarf, a girl called Laura, in the pub. Finn is caught showering in the community centre by Greg the probation worker. In the powers support group attended by Rudy Two, a new member, named Sam (earlier saved from a mugging by Finn and Alex), admits that he can fly.
32	3	"Episode Three"	William McGregor	Howard Overman	6 November 2013	0.729
Abbey has started a relationship with Laura. Memories triggered in Laura's presence reveal that Abbey is Laura's imaginary friend, brought to life by the storm. Laura is unnerved and pushes Abbey away, but not before Abbey reminds Laura of her childhood nightmare, a bogeyman called "Scary". Scary is brought to life and starts to stalk Laura. Abbey attempts to commit suicide, but is saved by Jess. Laura begins to accept Abbey back into her life, and the two manage to kill Scary. Abbey leaves Laura on good terms, with a new found joy in having an identity. Greg believes that Finn is gay (having seen his sexual act with Alex in the season's first episode) and falls in love with him. Finn, cornered on a balcony, accidentally uses his telekinesis to push Greg over the railing. Finn, Rudy and Alex decide to bury the body, only to discover that Greg is still alive. The three set up Greg in a car so that he will believe he has had a drunk car crash. Greg seems to lose interest in Finn as a result. At the power support group, Rudy Two encourages Sam to stand up to his bullies, leading Sam to save Rudy Two by flying him away from a mugging.
33	4	"Episode Four"	Lawrence Gough	Jon Brown	13 November 2013	0.782
Rudy One awakens to find that Rudy Two is gone. When the group see an old man walking about, Rudy One sees his tattoos and realises that it is Rudy Two. The group attend the power support group for information about the real Rudy Two's whereabouts. The group meet a man whose power causes him to be a closet homosexual, literally. A young man approaches Rudy Two/old man and threatens him. When Rudy Two/old man has a heart attack, an electrician called Helen with the power of electricity resuscitates him. Rudy One and Jess take Rudy Two/old man to a nursing home where one of the nurses recognises both Rudys. Whilst Rudy is searching through the room of the actual old man (Mr Johnson), the threatening young man returns and attempts to kill Rudy Two. Rudy One intervenes and the young man admits that he is the younger version of Mr Johnson and has the power to swap ages with people. The young Mr.Johnson swaps back ages with Rudy Two. Rudy and Jess' relationship begins to blossom. Rudy Two shows Sam "the superhero jumper", and he suggests the missing person may be Rudy.
34	5	"Episode Five"	Lawrence Gough	Howard Overman	20 November 2013	0.699
A girl named Leah has the power to hack into peoples brains and put them into a digital representation of real life. Finn meets a girl at the power support group and goes on a date with her, after he accidentally spat biscuit into her hair. When they see each other again the girl claims she has no idea who Finn is, as her brain has been hacked by Leah. Leah hacks into Finn's brain and sends him to a parallel universe, where she tries to win Finn over so they could be together. The rest of the gang find real Finn unconscious on Leah's bed. Alex steals the USB which has Finn inside it, thus allowing Finn to return to real life. Leah returns and hacks into Alex's brain by phoning him from Finn's phone, which he left at Leah's. Alex turns psychotic, abducts Finn and nails Rudy, Jess and Abbey to the floor, from whence Helen later frees them. Finn and Leah begin their relationship after they both return to normal. Rudy wants to get together with Jess, so he videos Jess on the toilet in an attempt to help Finn get over her. Rudy accidentally sends the video to all his contacts, including Jess. She forgives him and the two kiss on top of the community centre.
35	6	"Episode Six"	Lewis Arnold	Howard Overman	27 November 2013	0.638
As part of their community service, the gang have to look after a group of terminally ill patients. However, one of the patients seems intent on cheating death. A mysterious gypsy casts a spell on Alex after he refuses to help a damsel in distress, and Rudy Two takes another step closer to finding the missing superhero depicted on "the superhero jumper".
36	7	"Episode Seven"	Lewis Arnold	Jon Brown	4 December 2013	0.654
As the first anniversary of the storm approaches, Rudy Two and Abbey arrange a celebratory party at the community centre. During the party, Rudy Two unites Karen, Helen and Sam, the superheroes depicted on "the superhero jumper". Despite their scepticism, it isn't long before this new gang confront their first supervillain, an old friend battling to keep his own power under control. Alex meets Sarah, who has a mysterious power that is making her life a misery. After agreeing to take Sarah's power away, Alex begins to fall for her, until he discovers that an unexpected side effect of his power has devastating consequences.
37	8	"Episode Eight"	Wayne Yip	Howard Overman	11 December 2013	0.729
The gang discover that their community service is over and begin to contemplate life after the orange jumpsuits. Still upset at the way Rudy treated her, Jess seeks comfort elsewhere; however, she soon discovers that her companion has a terrifying power that threatens her very existence. Meanwhile, Rudy Two discovers that Helen, Karen and Sam aren't quite the superheroes he expected them to be.
