= List of Misfits characters =

The British Channel 4 science fiction comedy-drama Misfits features a number of fictional characters. The main cast comprises five characters, while a number of additional characters support the show. The main cast originally consisted of Alisha Daniels (Antonia Thomas), Curtis Donovan (Nathan Stewart-Jarrett), Kelly Bailey (Lauren Socha), Nathan Young (Robert Sheehan), and Simon Bellamy (Iwan Rheon). After Sheehan (Nathan) left the role Rudy Wade (Joseph Gilgun) was introduced. Rheon (Simon) and Thomas (Alisha) departed their roles at the end of series 3. Seth (Matthew McNulty) is initially introduced as a guest character but later begins appearing in a recurring role. Jess (Karla Crome) and Finn (Nathan McMullen) join the cast in a main role at the beginning of series four. Supporting characters introduced have included Sally (Alex Reid), Pete (Michael Obiora), Superhoodie, Nikki (Ruth Negga), Shaun (Craig Parkinson) and Greg (Shaun Dooley).

== Cast table ==
| Character | Portrayed by | Series | | | | |
| Character | Portrayed by | Series 1 (2009) | Series 2 (2010) | Series 3 (2011) | Series 4 (2012) | Series 5 (2013) |
Main
| Curtis Donovan | Nathan Stewart-Jarrett | Main (Note: Stewart-Jarrett is credited through season 4 episode 4.) | Main | Main | Main | |
| Simon Bellamy | Iwan Rheon | Main | Main | Main | | |
| Kelly Bailey | Lauren Socha | Main | Main | Main | | |
| Alisha Daniels | Antonia Thomas | Main | Main | Main | | |
| Nathan Young | Robert Sheehan | Main | Main | Guest (Note: Sheehan appears in the online short episode "Vegas Baby!" which is a prequel to the third season, and is credited in episode 8 of season 3, although he only appears in archival footage.) | | |
| Rudy Wade (Note: Gilgun appears throughout as both Rudy and Rudy Too and appears as Dark Rudy in season 4 episode 3.) | Joseph Gilgun | | | Main | Main | Main |
| Jess | Karla Crome | | | | Main | Main |
| Finnley Aran Samson | Nathan McMullen | | | | Main | Main |
| Abbey Smith | Natasha O'Keeffe | | | | Main (Note: O'Keeffe first appears in season 4 episode 6.) | Main |
| Alex | Matt Stokoe | | | | Recurring (Note: Stokoe is missing from the opening titles but is credited with the main cast in the end credits throughout the fourth season, starting with episode 2.) | Main |
Recurring
| Sally | Alex Reid | Recurring | Guest | Guest | | |
| Pete | Michael Obiora | Recurring | Guest | | | |
| Tony Morecombe | Danny Sapani | Recurring | | Guest | | |
| Louise Young | Michelle Fairley | Recurring | | | | |
| Mike Young | Dexter Fletcher | Guest | Guest | | | |
| Gary | Josef Altin | Guest | | Guest | | |
| Rachel | Jessica Brown Findlay | Guest | | Guest | | |
| Shaun | Craig Parkinson | | Recurring (Note: Although not listed in the opening credits, is listed below the rest of the main cast and before the guest stars in the closing credits.) | Recurring | | |
| Nikki | Ruth Negga | | Recurring | | | |
| Seth | Matthew McNulty | | Guest | Recurring | Recurring | |
| Lily | Catrin Stewart | | Guest | Guest | | |
| Tim | Matt Cross | | Guest | | | Recurring |
| Melissa | Kehinde Fadipe | | | Recurring | | |
| Marnie | Gwyneth Keyworth | | Guest | Guest | | |
| Lola | Lucy Gaskell | | | | Recurring | |
| Nadine | Gillian Saker | | | | Recurring | |
| Sadie | Imogen Doel | | | | Recurring | |
| Greg | Shaun Dooley | | | | Recurring | Recurring |
| Sam | Michael Winder | | | | | Recurring |
| Maggie | Ruth Sheen | | | | | Recurring |
| Helen | Ellie Kendrick | | | | | Recurring |
| Stuart | Oliver Lansley | | | | | Recurring |
| Karen | Kate Bracken | | | | | Recurring |

== Main cast ==
The original main characters of Misfits, left to right: Curtis (Nathan Stewart-Jarrett), Nathan (Robert Sheehan), Kelly (Lauren Socha), Alisha (Antonia Thomas) and Simon (Iwan Rheon).

The initial five main characters are brought together when they are all sent to community service for various crimes. A storm occurs and the group are struck by it without any damage. They discover they each have a superpower, with the exception of Nathan, who does not find out his power until the finale of the first series. Their probation worker Tony is also affected by the storm and flies into a murderous rage. They kill Tony in self-defence. After this, the group go on to become more of a unit when further developments of how many other people who were affected by the storm comes to light. Rudy, Jess and Finn eventually join the group when they end up in community service, integrating with the group as the original members leave.

=== Nathan Young ===
Alongside the rest of the 'ASBO five', Nathan gains his powers in the storm. Nathan's powers aren't revealed till later in the series, whereupon in S1E6 Nathan falls off the roof of the community center and is impaled on the fence below him. Nathan wakes up later in his coffin, realizing he is immortal. Nathan dies a total of five times in the series. In S2E2 Nathan is revealed to have a 'second' power, as he is able to see the ghosts of the recently deceased. Nathan later goes on to sell his power and buy a new one in S2E7, exchanging his immortality for the ability to use 'real' magic. His new power is only visible in the short 'Vegas Baby!'.

=== Simon Bellamy ===
Simon began the series with the power of invisibility, tying into Simon's reclusiveness and how he feels 'invisible' when alienated by the rest of the group. While initially he struggles with controlling his power, he gains access to it fairly quickly. in S2E7, Simon sells his power, and purchases another. Simon gains the ability of Foresight to begin with, making him able see the imminent future of a course of events. He can alter his future by choosing a different course of events if he chooses to. When Simon realizes he has to become 'Superhoodie', he purchases two other powers. Immunity, and One-way Time Travel. Immunity is the ability to be unaffected by other people's powers. One-way Time Travel is the power to travel back in time to any desired point. Unlike Time Reversal, the user cannot return to the present and instead of appearing in place of their past self, they appear as a duplicate whilst their past self stays where they were at that time.

=== Kelly Bailey ===
Kelly originally had the power of telepathy. After she sold this power she then gained a power that made her a rocket scientist. She briefly gained the power to turn back time in an alternate time stream (created when the previous owner of the turn back time power tried to kill Hitler and inadvertently gave Hitler his cell phone - enabling the Nazis to win WW2) but switched back to being a rocket scientist after correcting the time stream.

=== Curtis Donovan ===
Curtis originally had the power of time manipulation, allowing him to travel back and change events, stemming from his regret over the incident that led to his community service. He later exchanged this for the power to swap biological sex, and later the ability to resurrect the dead (albeit as zombies).

=== Alisha Daniels ===
Alisha initially gained the ability to make those who touch her skin go into a sexual frenzy towards her. She later gains the power to see through another person's eyes. She knew Rudy in high school, and has a relationship with Curtis. She later fell in love with future Simon, carrying those feelings over to the present Simon when his future self died. Her death prompted Simon's return to the past.

=== Rudy Wade ===
Portrayed by Joe Gilgun, Rudy is given community service after damaging his ex-girlfriend's car. The storm affected him so that he splits off a gentler and sadder version of himself, Rudy Two. It's later revealed that there was a third, more aggressive Rudy as well, who the other two let get arrested and go to prison. A shallow womaniser for most of the show, he changes his ways after meeting and falling in love with the nun Nadine. He ends up in a relationship with Jess.

=== Jess ===
Jess is played by Karla Crome. She and Finn join community service at the same time. She gained the ability to see through solid objects. She has a brief relationship with Alex, but eventually ends up with Rudy.

=== Finn Samson ===
Finn is played by Nathan McMullen. His power is telekinesis, though he can usually only move small objects with great effort. For most of his time on community service he has a deep crush on Jess.

=== Abbey Smith ===
Portrayed by Natasha O'Keeffe, Abbey Smith believes she lost her memory in the storm, since she can't remember her life before it. Rudy and Finn encounter her drunk and unconscious at a party; she later pretends to be on community service to keep Finn out of trouble, but is found out and sentenced to community service for real.

=== Alex ===
Alex is played by Matt Stokoe. A barman who works with Curtis, he first appears in the fourth series and behaves oddly around women, including Jess when she asks him out. It's revealed he has no powers as he wasn't caught in the storm, but has been affected by someone else's power. And the end of series four he is injured and receives a lung transplant from a storm survivor, gaining the power to remove the powers of others by having sex with them. At the start of series five, he breaks into the community centre to save Jess from a possessed Finn, and is sentenced to community service as punishment.

== Supporting cast ==
=== Sally ===
Sally, played by Alex Reid, appears in the first episode. Sally is revealed to be the fiancée of Tony, whom the group have killed in self-defence. She becomes the group's new probation worker. She suspects that the Misfits are involved in Tony's disappearance and she begins leaving threatening messages in group's lockers. She begins contacting Simon over the internet under the alias 'Shygirl18'. In the 4th episode of series 1, she searches their lockers, finding Tony's credit card in Simon's. In the next episode, she fakes an interest in Simon in order to find evidence that the Misfits are involved in Tony's death, but Simon rejects her suggestion that he should turn the other Misfits in, proclaiming they are the only friends he has. Simon accidentally kills her when he throws her against a door as they violently fight each other. Simon keeps her corpse in a freezer in the community centre and visits her body often. In the first episode of the second series, Simon realises that he needs to dispose of Sally's body, since a search is to be conducted. While sneaking her out, under a sheet in a wheelbarrow, he is confronted by the other Misfits, and tells them what happened. At the end of the episode, the Misfits wrap her in blankets, row out to the middle of the canal, and dump her weighted body into the water. Sally re-appears in the finale of Series 3, when she is brought back by a medium. Thinking she has been brought back to take revenge upon the gang she tricks Simon into kissing her, filming it on his phone and sends it to Alisha. She later tries to push Alisha off a building but is stopped when Tony finds her. He tells her they have both been brought back to say goodbye to one another, they then embrace and kiss, moving on to the afterlife.

=== Pete ===
Pete, played by Michael Obiora, first appears in episode 3 of series 1. He first appears when investigating the disappearance of Gary and Tony. He later tells Sally that Tony has purchased a ticket for a flight using his credit card so it is likely Tony is alive. In episode 4, it is revealed that he was the policeman who arrested Curtis for drugs possession, resulting in his community service sentence. When Curtis goes back in time, we see Pete in the club. He asks Alisha where she bought drugs from and rejects her advances. After Alisha points out a drug dealer who is speaking to Curtis and Sam he searches them. Upon finding Curtis with a small amount of drugs he gives Curtis community service to send out a message because of his status. In episode 6 of series 1 he comes looking for Sally at the community centre. He later appears in episode 1 of series 2 when questioning the group about Sally's whereabouts after her disappearance and tells Shaun that he may disappear next.

=== Superhoodie ===
Superhoodie, played by Daniel Ilabaca, first appears in one of Simon's videos, helping a member of the public, and features on posters both on the E4 website game and in the show. In the first series' finale, Superhoodie helps Nathan escape a group of 'Virtue' followers. His face is concealed by a hood and a black mask. He is later seen in another of Simon's videos, demonstrating extreme free running skills before talking to Simon. He reveals he has been watching the Misfits and is aware of their abilities. In the first series, Superhoodie is portrayed by free runner Neil Hutson. Superhoodie returns in the first episode of the second series, dressed in black, initially studying a room full of photos of the Misfits along with five large digital clocks counting down to an unspecified target. He throws a paper aeroplane from a building across a river to Kelly, informing her to go to Nathan's grave where she discovers his immortality. He returns at the conclusion of the episode, saving Curtis from suffocation at the hands of Lucy. In the second episode of the second series, he shields a temporarily mortal Nathan from his brother Jamie's exploding car, causing him to be apparently hurt quite badly by shrapnel, though he manages to escape. In episode 3 of Series 2 Superhoodie leads the group to Nikki's flat. Having repeatedly saved Alisha from danger, Superhoodie reveals himself to be a future version of Simon to her, and makes her keep his identity hidden. It is revealed that he is immune to Alisha's power, while present-day Simon is not. They enter into a secret relationship and he tells her that he travelled through time to make sure particular events happen. In the fourth episode of the second series, Ollie is put into community service along with the group but is soon after killed by Tim, and his heart is transplanted to Nikki, who in turn gains Ollie's power. Alisha confronts future Simon when she discovers that he knew it would happen but didn't stop it, but Simon tells her that if he saved Ollie, there would have been consequences. When Tim kidnaps Kelly, the group steal £100,000, but when they deliver it to him, Tim takes the other Misfits hostage. Alisha escapes her binds but Tim catches her. He is about to shoot her but future Simon, who has been timing the events, drops down from a skylight and takes the bullet. As Tim leaves to complete his next 'level', Alisha cradles a dying Simon and admits she is in love with him. He dies and at his instruction Alisha burns his body, having received the key to his base. Alisha reveals Superhoodie's true identity to Simon after the Misfits go public, as well as her relationship with him, but this timeline is erased by Curtis. In the three-month gap between the second series' finale and the Christmas special, Alisha tells Simon who Superhoodie really is.

The Independent described the character as a "guardian angel for the misfits" who is "seen free-running, leaping from rooftop to rooftop until he stands, Batman-like, surveying the city".

=== Shaun ===
Shaun, played by Craig Parkinson, is a probation worker who replaces Sally's position in the second series. He has a very relaxed, somewhat bored attitude towards the group, and although he seems to understand when they are lying to him, he doesn't let it bother him if it happens beyond his working hours, at which point he washes his hands of all responsibility and goes home. He is also not worried by the fact that the last two probation workers have disappeared. The Misfits unintentionally kill him on his first day of work when they assume that he is the disguised Lucy, but Curtis is able to undo the event. In the second series' penultimate episode he overhears Nathan, Curtis and Simon talking about their powers and sells them out to the media before leaving the country. Curtis later rewinds this timeline. He becomes the group's probation worker when they begin community service for a second time. In the fifth episode of the third series he is stabbed by a girl called Jen who swaps bodies with Kelly. As he is dying from the wound in the changing rooms of the community centre, the group revealed to him that they have superpowers. He laughs in his last few moments expressing his disbelief that he has remained ignorant to the situation. In an alternative timeline where the Nazis won WWII, Shaun was a Nazi officer. He had a relationship with Alisha after she was caught drunk driving and he released her. He was shot by Kelly, who wanted to release Seth from prison and was disappointed to find out that Alisha was cheating on him with Simon.

Neela Debnath of The Independent labelled Shaun "lecherous". MSN News opined that Shaun was played "brilliantly" and questioned if the fact that he makes it clear that he "couldn't care less about the young offenders" has anything to do with him having "survived longer than any of his predecessors". Neela Debnath of The Independent felt Shaun's ending was "shocking" adding that even though all previous probation workers had been killed it was "completely unexpected" when Shaun was killed. Debnath added that out of all previous probation workers he was "the most memorable because of his apathetic attitude towards youth offenders and the rehabilitation system". She added that Parkinson's performance has been "brilliant" through his time on the show which means both he and his character will "be sorely missed". On his final moments she added that they were "very touching" because there was an understanding between the group and Shaun. Digital Spy branded Shaun "fab".

=== Nikki ===
Nikki, played by Ruth Negga, is a young woman with an unspecified heart condition who becomes involved with the gang. She is introduced in the second episode of the second series when Curtis' inverted power causes him to 'flash forward' and experience a future event, a romantic encounter on a rooftop with Nikki. The Misfits then encounter her in the present when they break into her flat, mistakenly believing it was the residence of Superhoodie, who had led the group there. Curtis continues to visit her, learning about her heart condition. When Ollie, the group's new member of community service, is shot and killed, Nikki is given his heart. The transplant cures her heart condition, but also leaves her with Ollie's ability to teleport. Nikki possesses little to no control over this ability. When Nikki feels she is about to teleport, she experiences a sensation similar to falling, or being drawn backwards, and then she immediately shifts to her new location. Nikki and Curtis begin a relationship after he tells her about the Misfits' powers and the effects of the storm. During a fancy dress party, the two of them experience the events from Curtis' 'flash-forward' again. In the Christmas special, Curtis and Nikki sell their abilities to Seth, who can deal powers. The couple plan to travel together, but Nikki is shot and killed by an armed robber under the orders of a priest named Elliot pretending to be Jesus. Her death inspires the group to try to regain their abilities, as Nikki would never have died if they still had their powers. Curtis' power to rewind time is no longer available, since he sold his power to Seth, and Nikki remains dead.

=== Greg ===
Greg, played by Shaun Dooley, is the gang's fifth probation worker, replacing Laura, who was bitten by a zombie and subsequently killed by Rudy before she could start her first day. He first appears at the end of the first episode of Series 4. He mocks Finn in front of the group. Later on Finn asks Greg if he can leave the community centre, to which Greg responds by asking him to pay him. When Finn pays him Greg takes his money and refuses to let him leave.

Dooley had been a fan of the show since it began so approached the casting director for a role. The casting director later told the producer of the show who agreed that Dooley would be "ideal" as the new probation worker. Dooley described Greg, saying he is "really, really horrible – a complete sociopath. He can flip on the turn of a coin from being really nice to completely horrific, and he’s suddenly someone who’s going to kill you there and then. He’s brilliant to play". He added that the character is "a test to play" due to his nature to "flip" when he is acting naturally, similar to "Jekyll and Hyde within his own personality". Dooley felt the part a challenge to play due to Greg's intensity. Dooley said Greg is "very funny, but because his character’s so funny", explaining that the audience are supposed to "laugh at him" rather than with him.

Digital Spy's Morgan Jeffrey said the first episode of series 4 begins to feel like the show has "begun to find itself again", which is "compounded with the magnificent arrival of sinister new probation worker Greg". Neela Debnath of The Independent commented that Greg "is terrifying and may even have a scary power of his own. However, he comes across as far too aggressive and hostile without any reason it would seem. His frightening temperament will probably be explained later on but at the moment it feels too jarring and he is just a pure ball of fury". Radio Times said "Dooley growls, gnashes his teeth and generally has a whale of a time as the terrifying new probation officer".

=== Lola ===
Lola, played by Lucy Gaskell is introduced in episode 2 of series 4. Lola was originally an aspiring actress called Debby. As a result of the storm, her desire to better embody her characters transformed her into one of her roles: Lola, a manipulative seductress with a troubled past. As Lola, she seduced men into killing her ex-boyfriends, eventually setting her sights on Curtis while pretending to be a trainee probation worker. After manipulating him into killing her ex-boyfriend Jake, Curtis eventually learns the truth behind her power while Lola begins to set up Curtis's murder. Events transpire in which Lola shoots and kills her new boyfriend in an attempt to stage a double murder. This results in Curtis getting shot, but his current situation as a zombie leaves him invulnerable allowing him to bite and then murder Lola. This is then followed by his own suicide.

Digital Spy's Catriona Wightman said Lola is "so clearly bad news that she should really wear a hat with a flashing warning sign. She's properly full on, purring about how she loves bad boys and spraying graffiti to watch Curtis "scrub". Unsurprisingly, this ends up with the duo doing the dirty at the end of the episode". Wightman felt it "hard to really care" about the storyline as she knew it was only building up the storyline for the next episode.

== Other characters ==
| Character | Episode(s) | Actor | Biography |
|---|---|---|---|
| Tony Morecombe | 1.1, 1.4, 3.8 | Danny Sapani; Louis Decosta Johnson | Tony, played by Danny Sapani and Louis Decosta Johnson in his psychotic state, is the original probation worker to the group. After the storm, he enters a frenzied state of rage, gains superhuman strength and enhanced durability. He murders Gary and tries to attack the group, but is killed in self-defence by Kelly. The police believe that he is residing out of the country after Simon steals his credit card to fake activity. He appears in the fourth episode when Curtis travels back in time where his car is stolen leading him to repeatedly kick the wall of the car park. Tony makes a brief return as a spirit. His spirit has no superpowered rage and he tells the group he did not mean to attack them. He convinces Sally she has not returned for revenge but for him and they reunite before moving onto the spirit world together. Tim Dowling of The Guardian described him as being "turned into a shiny-eyed, marauding monster, a bit like the Hulk but without his sense of fair play". The Herald described Tony as "earnest" and as being turned "into a frothing, homicidal maniac who hacked another Asbo kid to death with an axe" by the storm. |
| Gary | 1.1, 3.4 | Josef Altin | Gary is originally part of the community service group. He is not caught in the storm which gives the group powers. He is soon after killed by Tony. In the alternate reality created by Curtis depicted in episode 4, Gary still dies. In another alternate present where Nazis rule England, Gary is still alive and is friends with Kelly. He is murdered by Captain Smith by being frozen to death. Tim Dowling of The Guardian described him as the "violent one" of the group of "foul-mouthed young criminals". |
| Louise Young | 1.1, 1.2 | Michelle Fairley | Louise is the mother of Nathan. She kicks her son out of her home after his repeated disrespectful behaviour towards Jeremy, her partner. |
| Jeremy | 1.2 | Jo Stone-Fewings | Jeremy is the boyfriend of Nathan's mother, who is the reason Nathan was kicked out of his home. He is found one morning by the Misfits while they are doing community service. It is revealed that come nightfall, the storm has reinvigorated his relapsed memories of a childhood pet, and he believes that he is a dog. In this condition he walks, or rather lopes, the streets naked. |
| Ruth | 1.2 | Amy Beth Hayes; Clare Welch | Ruth, played by Amy Beth Hayes as a young woman and Clare Welch as an old woman, is a volunteer at the community centre. Nathan begins a brief relationship with her only to discover that she is 82 years old. When caught in the storm she had gained the ability to make herself young, although she spontaneously returns to her old form at certain moments of high intensity, such as having an orgasm. However, she worries that she is losing her power. Although Nathan later attempts to apologise to her after he rejected her because of her age, he finds that she has died in her sleep, in her 82-year-old state. |
| Jodi | 1.3 | Bunmi Mojekwu | Jodi is the reason Kelly was given community service after an incident whereby she called Kelly a "slag" and Kelly hit her. Jodi has the power to turn people bald as a form of emotional projection to make people feel how she feels as she has alopecia. She regrets not having real control over this power, turning her ex-boyfriend bald whenever she sees him due to him dumping her. She reveals her condition to Kelly and the two girls call a truce. |
| Ben | 1.3 | Jamie Davis | Ben is a volunteer who works at the community centre to set the group the task of sorting clothes. Alisha uses her power on him. Afterwards, Ben feels embarrassed about the experience, explaining that he cannot remember how it happened. Ben and Alisha go the park. When Curtis follows them, she accidentally touches them both where they attempt to have sex with her despite her protests but she escapes. Ben leaves the centre after the group finish the task. |
| Sam | 1.4, 1.5 | Anna Koval | Sam is the former girlfriend of Curtis, who took the blame for him and was sent to prison for possessing drugs. Sam is upset by Curtis's involvement with Alisha. Curtis alters history to prevent Sam initially being arrested, spurring a series of increasingly disastrous temporal revisions. She returns to the community centre under the assumption they are in a relationship. Curtis breaks up with Sam due to his relationship with Alisha, although he is forced to do this repeatedly as his Time Reversal power was triggered whenever Sam started crying. |
| Matt | 1.4, 1.5 | Jamie Blackley | Matt and Simon are neighbours. When Matt is at school, he bullies Simon. He later texts Simon asking to meet him at a bar. When Simon arrives, he tells him that he accidentally text him. Simon becomes angry and tries to burn down Matt's house. Simon is given community service for this. |
| Danny | 1.4 | Stephen Wight | Danny is a drug dealer that sells cocaine. He originally sold it to Sam and Curtis, which landed Sam in jail and Curtis in community service. However, Curtis rolled back time and changed history, so that neither Sam nor Danny were arrested for possession, but Curtis was found with one roll of cocaine so that he would still be sent to community service. |
| Mike Young | 1.4,1.8, 2.2 | Dexter Fletcher | Mike is Nathan's dad, and formerly Louise's husband. The three of them originally lived in Ireland, but Mike cheated on Louise (resulting in the birth of Jamie, Nathan's half-brother), so Louise and Nathan moved to England. During the fourth episode of the first series, Mike arrives to bail Nathan out of trouble at the bowling alley. Nathan refuses his help, and is arrested and sentenced to community service. From his comments, Nathan views Mike as a bad father. |
| Lee | 1.1, 1.4 | Ben Smith | Lee was Kelly's fiancé. Lee proposed to Kelly after a party at the nightclub. Upon leaving the club, Lee broke into a nearby car, in which he found an engagement ring. He proposed to Kelly right there, and drove off in the stolen vehicle. It is later revealed that the car belonged to Tony and the ring was intended for Sally. However, after the storm, Kelly hears Lee's less-than-romantic thoughts and punches him, causing him to end the relationship. |
| Finn | 1.5 | Unknown | Finn is a baby of a single mother who possesses the power of mental manipulation and makes Nathan want to be his father. Kelly reads Finn's thoughts and realises Finn is manipulating Nathan. Finn soon rejects Nathan when it becomes clear he would be a bad father. Kelly tells Finn's mother to take him to see his real dad, hoping the toddler's ability will convince him to give fatherhood another chance. |
| Rachel | 1.6, 3.8 | Jessica Brown Findlay | Rachel, the head of the recently established 'Virtue' organization at the community centre, possesses the storm-based power of suggestion, specifically able to influence others to become what she deems 'perfect' youths. Her power requires the subject to hear what she is saying, causing their transformation when she speaks to them. Nathan takes her hostage on the community centre roof using a gun. He demands she undo her influence but she says she doesn't know how or if she can. She realises his gun is actually a water pistol, and in the ensuing brawl they fall to their deaths, ending her influence. Rachel returns as a spirit with unfinished business. She thinks doing anything she missed out on in life would help her find peace and move on. When this fails, she seeks revenge, and kills Alisha, thus allowing her to move on. |
| Lucy | 2.1 | Evelyn Hoskins | Lucy is a former friend of Simon's, whom he met during his treatment in a psychiatric unit after his attempted arson. She has the ability to shape-shift into other individuals and animals. Lucy's clothes and voice also change through shape-shifting, however, she can't replicate powers. When she finds Simon again at the community centre, her obsession with Simon causes him to reject her for his new friends. Feeling hurt, she uses her power to wreak havoc on the Misfits and discovers Sally's death in the process. She intends to confess Simon's crime to the police in his form, in the hope that he will be sent back to the unit with her again. Simon follows her to the station where he apologises for ignoring her and eventually convinces her to abandon her plan. She decides to let Simon leave. |
| Jamie | 2.2 | Sam Keeley | Jamie is Nathan's half brother, conceived when Nathan's father had an affair. He believes than Nathan had a better relationship with their father, so he knocks out their father and put him in a car boot. He goes to confront Nathan and the two bond over drinks. Nathan invites Jamie and Lily out on a night out. Jamie gives the group pills, which inverts their powers. Lily and Jamie retreat to his car and when the pair are having sex her power of ice-generating inverts to fire-generating and accidentally burnt Jamie and herself to death. As an apparent side-effect of Nathan's power of immortality, he was able to see Jamie's 'spirit' after his death. Jamie encouraged Nathan to spend time repairing his relationship with his father before he vanished with Lily's spirit, the two now apparently in a relationship. |
| Lily | 2.2, 3.4 | Catrin Stewart | Lily is a barmaid who acquires the ability of cryokinesis on account of her 'frigid' nature with intimacy issues. When Nathan witnessed her power in action while she was at work, he told her about his own power, subsequently defending her to her boss. In return, Lily gave him her number. She meets up with Nathan and his brother at a nightclub. Jamie gives her a pill, reversing her powers, resulting in Lily generating fire. While having sex in a car with Jamie, she sets fire to the car killing both of them. Her spirit appears to Nathan when he is reconciling with his father. In an alternate present where Nazis rule England, Lily is shown to still be alive, but is only seen briefly when she is having her powers stolen from her via Seth before being taken away for questioning. Her power is later used to kill Gary by the hands of Captain Smith. |
| Vince | 2.3 | Nathan Constance | Vince is a tattoo artist who owns 'Vince's Tattoos' and has the ability to tattoo people, which affect how they think and feel. Kelly, Nathan and Simon visit his parlour in order for Kelly to have an old tattoo re-inked. After being antagonised by Nathan about several of his tattoos, Vince makes Nathan fall in love with Simon by giving him a tattoo. Some time later, Kelly returns to question him and in doing so falls under Vince's power when he tattoos her, making her fall in love with him. When all the group, without Alisha, return to the parlour to have the tattoos removed, he uses his ability once again to 'stab' Curtis with a tattoo of a knife piercing his stomach and place barbed wire around Simon's neck. His weakness is a nut allergy which Simon uses. Simon grabs Vince's epinephrine pen and offers a trade to remove the tattoos for his life, he complies and is given his medication. |
| Ollie | 2.4 | Joshua McGuire | Ollie is an environmental protester who is given community service after vandalising a coal-fired power station over carbon emissions. He openly questions the Misfits about their powers, and in doing so reveals that he has the power of teleportation. The only setback is that Ollie can only manage his power through great effort and only moves small distances. He is shot and killed by Tim whilst attempting to amediate the situation. Ollie's heart is donated to Nikki, so she ends up having Ollie's power. |
| Tim | 2.4, 5.1, 5.2, 5.4, 5.7 | Matt Cross | Tim believes himself to be the main character in an excessively violent video game. Upon meeting the Misfits, he accuses Simon of being Conti and believes Kelly to be his ex-fiancée, Roxy, both game characters. He shoots and kills Ollie. He kidnaps Kelly, telling Alisha to tell Conti that he wants his £100,000. While Simon and the others steal from an armoured vehicle in order to give Tim what he wants. After he is given the money he progresses to the 'next level', now believing one of them to be an undercover policeman. He puts them all on meat hooks and threatens Alisha with a chain saw. Nathan and Curtis distract him allowing Alisha to escape. Tim corners her and prepares to shoot her, only for future Simon to appear and take the bullet. When future Simon unmasks and claims to be the undercover cop, Tim leaves in search of his next level objective. Tim is arrested for trying to break into a prison. Tim returns in series 5 after escaping from prison, and is first seen as a member of the Power Support Group. He has started to learn to suppress his power. He mistakes Rudy Too and Helen for characters in his video game and threatens to shoot them, but is killed by a camouflaged Karen, and buried under the flyover. Cast members Iwan Rheon, Nathan Stewart-Jarrett, Lauren Socha and Joseph Gilgun chose Tim as their favourite villain to appear on the show. |
| Jessica | 2.5 | Zawe Ashton | Jessica is working at the community centre organising a charity run. Nathan suspects that she murdered him after watching change in the community centre locker room. Jessica shows an interest in Simon, worrying Nathan. While the group are attending a fancy dress party, it is revealed that Jessica's father is committing the murders to protect his daughter. Jessica and Simon have sex, both losing their virginities. Her father attempts to attack Simon but Alisha hits him over the head with a fire extinguisher. Jessica ends the relationship soon after. |
| Bruno | 2.5 | Richard Riddell | Bruno is a gorilla who became a human during the storm. Attracted to him because of his honest thoughts, Kelly has a brief relationship with him but ends it when an encounter becomes too rough. Bruno attempts to explain what has happened, his honest thoughts showing Kelly that he really didn't mean to hurt her; but a subsequent pursuit by the police leads him to run away and almost beat a policeman to death before being shot. Kelly removes his mask, and his true form is revealed to her. He dies soon after in Kelly's arms. |
| Dave | 2.5 | Adrian Rawlins | Dave is the father of Jessica. He is very protective of his daughter and this feeling becomes greatly intensified by the storm, to the point where, when a man gets close to his daughter, he becomes overwhelmed with rage and kills them. His eyes turn red around the pupils and his face quivers when he feels murderous rage. He almost kills Simon when he discovers that Simon took his daughter's virginity, but Alisha finds him and knocks him out with a fire extinguisher. He is then arrested by the police. |
| Brian | 2.6 | Jordan Metcalfe | Brian, also known as "Milk Man" or "Monsieur Grand Fromage", was originally a 'tea boy' who was affected by the storm when he opened his door to collect milk. Discovering that he had the ability to manipulate dairy products like milk, yoghurt and cheese, which he dubbed "lactokinesis", he went public with his power. After others with powers come forward he become angry at the attention they receive. He concluded that to be noticed he would go on a murder spree. He kills his girlfriend (who only went out with him because he was famous), his manager (who wished to represent clients with more impressive powers), Kelly, Alisha, and Nikki by manipulating dairy products they had eaten. He later wraps Nathan's cortex in mozzarella cheese to leave him permanently brain damaged. Brian tries to stab Curtis, who is lactose intolerant, only for Simon to intercept the blade while invisible. With the rest of the group dead, Curtis gained the necessary incentive to turn back time and prevent Brian from going fully public with his power. The group travel to Brian's house where Curtis punches him in the face. His fate is left ambiguous. |
| Daisy | 2.6 | Natalie Klamar | Daisy is a devout humanitarian who was affected by the storm. Daisy had the ability to heal others by rubbing her hands against their injuries, as shown when she healed a man whose legs had been paralysed. After Nathan contracted an STI, he asks her to cure him, but she instead recommended antibiotics as she did not want to touch Nathan's genitals or to just cure diseases contracted through poor personal choices. She is attacked by Brian and falls on an award, impaling herself. Nathan attempts to encourage her to heal herself, but it was unclear if her power didn't work on herself or if the fact that the object that killed her was still in the wound prevented her from healing. This timeline was undone by Curtis. |
| Elliot | 2.7 | Edward Hogg | Elliot is a priest who becomes angry at the lack of interest shown for his nativity scene he is hosting. He pays Seth to receive the power to walk on water, as well as telekinesis. He begins exploiting people for money by convincing them he is a resurrected Jesus Christ. He uses the money to buy more powers. He tells a follower that bad behaviour is acceptable to gain money for the church. The follower holds the Misfits at gunpoint and in the chaos Nikki is shot. Now possessing Alisha's old power, he attempts to rape her. Alisha tells Simon of the attempted rape angering him into deciding to kill Elliot. The Misfits confront him at the community centre. The group stumble upon his locker, which now contains hundreds of thousands of pounds. Planning to use the money to buy their powers back, they attempt to carry the locker out of the centre. Elliot tries to take it back using his telekinesis. The Misfits attempt to pull it back, but the locker flies out of the Misfits' grasp and careens into Elliot's head, killing him. |
| Marnie | 2.7, V.B.! | Gwyneth Keyworth | Marnie is a Welsh girl whom Nathan meets during the Christmas special in the community centre. She is heavily pregnant at the time. They quickly strike up a connection and frequently have sex throughout the episode. She does not know the identity of the father of her child, and Nathan is adamant about being there for Marnie and the baby. Towards the end of the episode, she gives birth in the community centre, surrounded by the Misfits, who attempt to help her deliver the baby. In the online episode Marnie and her baby Nathan Jr. joined Nathan with his new power to go to Las Vegas. |
| Tanya | 3.1 | Katie Moore | Tanya is given community service for possession of drugs although her boyfriend had put them in her handbag before they were stopped by the police. When caught in the storm she is given the power to freeze those around her. She starts speaking to Rudy unaware that it is his identical duplicate. She tells him her initial judgement of him was wrong. She sees Rudy kissing Charlie and freezes the people around her before hitting Rudy with a glass bottle and framing Curtis. She later freezes Rudy and pushes him down some stairs which is witnessed by Simon, Kelly and Curtis. She freezes them and frames them for throwing a brick through a police car window. Rudy frames her for stealing a charity box but she escapes the police by freezing them. She then uses her power to stab Charlie in the chest before putting the knife in Rudy's hand. Alisha walks in on Tanya standing over Rudy as he holds a dying Charlie in his arms. Tanya uses her power again to put Rudy and Alisha in nooses before writing them suicide notes. Upon her return Rudy kicks her, causing her to fall over Charlie and crack her head open on the floor. She then bleeds to death as Rudy and Alisha are saved by Rudy's identical duplicate. |
| Charlie | 3.1 | Nathalie Emmanuel | Charlie is part of the community service group along with Rudy and Tanya. She begins a relationship with Rudy and later witnesses his power. Tanya walks in on Rudy and Charlie about to have sex. Tanya then uses her power and stabs Charlie before placing the knife in Rudy's hand. Charlie dies in Rudy's arms. |
| Emma | 3.2 | Hannah Britland | Emma was an athletics runner who had a one-night stand with Curtis; she later vents to Curtis in his female form that he is too negative and a disappointment in bed. Emma and Melissa eventually form a sexual relationship which quickly ends when she witnesses a spiked Melissa getting oral sex from Rudy. She tries to have sex with Curtis in revenge but he rejects her, Emma then assumes that Melissa is also in a relationship with Curtis. Emma is spiked by their coach, Mark, who then tries to rape her but Curtis manages to intervene. The following morning, Curtis tells Emma everything before she leaves. |
| Mark | 3.2 | Jay Taylor | Mark is an athletics coach who at first appears to be attracted to Melissa, Curtis in his female form. He is revealed to be a rapist, who drugs young girls and takes to a spot where he has sex with them while they are unconscious. He attempts to rape Melissa, but fails when Melissa wakes up and changes back into Curtis, where he then manages to escape. Mark later decides to drug and rape Emma but Curtis intervenes by pulling Mark out of his car and brutally beating him. The following morning, Emma and Curtis tie Mark to some stairs next to the pitch naked with a confession of his previous actions written on his chest and with a muzzle strapped to his face. |
| Peter | 3.3, 3.4 | Michael Marcus | Peter is a comic book fanatic who at first became acquainted with Superhoodie after he saves him from a mugging. Peter manages to figure out that Simon is Superhoodie. Peter uses his power of drawing artwork which soon after becomes true to manipulate Simon into becoming a full-time superhero, resulting in him having to break up with Alisha and beat up the group. The group manage to save Simon by finding Peter's apartment and destroying all of his artwork. Peter dressed as a Superhoodie resembling alias, abducts Alisha and blackmails Simon into coming to rescue her. Simon stabs Peter, killing him, while saving Alisha. It is revealed that Peter had planned all these events to happen, including his death. In an alternate reality where Nazis rule England, Peter is still alive and is seen in the line to have his powers stripped from him, but when he tries to escape he is gunned down and killed as a consequence. The Guardian called Peter causing his own death via his comic strip a "masterful twist". |
| Friedrich Hirsch | 3.4 | Fred Pearson | Friedrich Hirsch is an old Jewish man who used Curtis' former power to travel back in time to kill Adolf Hitler, he failed, is stabbed in the stomach and had his mobile phone stolen from him. Upon his return to the present he discovers that the Nazis used the technology to gain the upper hand in World War II, and managed to win the war, resulting in England being ruled by Nazis. He is then incarcerated to have his stab wound attended. He gives his power to Seth, but is shot in the forehead by Captain Smith. Seth later gives the power of time travel to Kelly which she uses to undo Friedrich's mistake, but despite this, did not arrive in the past in time to prevent Friedrich from being stabbed and sent to his death in the alternate present. After Kelly gets the phone back from Hitler, she returns to the present and sees Friedrich, alive, putting flowers on a Holocaust memorial. |
| Captain Smith | 3.4 | Glenn Speers | Captain Smith is the main antagonist of the alternate universe where Nazis rule England. He uses Seth's power to gain more power but his hopes are later threatened when he finds out about Friedrich's power of timetravel. He strenuously tries to eliminate the power, but is ultimately outsmarted by Seth and the alternate timeline is undone. |
| Jen | 3.5 | Unknown | Jen is a coma patient who has the ability to swap bodies with other people. She uses her ability to swap bodies with Kelly when she touches her hand so she can be with her boyfriend Dom. Dom feels guilty and leaves Jen when she threatens to turn Kelly's life support off. After the group discover the switch, Jen is tricked into going to the community centre where the group attempt to force her to switch back. Jen panics and tries to run away, stabbing Shaun in the process. Seth is able to convince her to return to her original body and allow Dom to turn off her life support. |
| Dom | 3.5 | Nick Blood | Dom is the boyfriend of the Coma patient Jen. He struggles with her condition. After Jen swaps bodies with Kelly, she visits Dom telling him that she is Jen. He feels guilty because Kelly is now comatose. He leaves Jen after she threatens to switch of Kelly's life support machine. Dom says a last goodbye after Jen switches back and turns off the life support machine. |
| Leah | 3.6 | Amy Manson | Leah meets Rudy one night at a party while very drunk. The two have a one-night stand before which Leah tells him she doesn't want this to be a one night thing and makes sure that he will call her the next day. Rudy lies, using her for sex. She is then revealed to be able to give a superpower STD and uses this on Rudy. Rudy realises that there is a problem with his penis and Simon sees into the future and tells Rudy his penis will soon fall off. Rudy finds her but she tells him she is angry at the treatment he gave her and leaves. Rudy grabs a microphone from the DJ and publicly apologises to any girl he has ever used for sex. Leah says she can see his regret and heals his penis. He offers to buy her a drink but she declines. |
| Erazer | Erazer | William Bliss | Erazer has the power to create his own dimension by painting it. He creates Suzy by painting her but she is unaware she can not survive outside his reality. She decides to leave but realises she can not so resigns to stay with him. |
| Suzy | Erazer | Esther Smith | Suzy is a girl created when Erazer paints her. She is trapped in his dimension and realises so when she decides to leave with Rudy but can not as she would die outside of Erazer's realm. She decides to remain there. |
| Shannon | 3.7 | Charlene McKenna | Shannon is the ex-girlfriend of Seth. She was killed when Seth gave her drugs which she overdosed on. Shannon is resurrected by Curtis but when she returns she is hungry for blood. She kills Seth's iguana and eats it. She later confronts Kelly saying she took Seth away from her and is about to attack Kelly when Seth kills her. |
| Jonas | 3.8 | Mark Heap | Jonas is a medium who was affected by the storm and given the power to bring back spirits. He brings back the spirits of Sally, Tony and Rachel. |
| Michael | 4.1 | Nathaniel Martello-White | Michael is a former con-man and gangster who was involved in a robbery of a diamond store. He murdered his co-conspirators in order to keep all the stolen money for himself, but due to the storm, gained the power of greed endowment, causing anyone to come into contact with him to become obsessed with the briefcase filled with money and ruthless like him. After being kidnapped and mutilated by Curtis, Rudy and Seth under the influence of Michael's power, Michael falls to his death from the top of the community centre, his last action holding his blood-stained money. |
| Sadie | 4.1, 4.2 | Imogen Doel | Sadie is Finn's high-school sweetheart who gains the power of suggestion, specifically able to manipulate Finn into being an ideal boyfriend. When he is momentarily released from her control, Finn decides to prevent her from using her power by gagging and binding her, until she is freed by a suspicious Rudy. Finn and Sadie attempt to return to a normal relationship until he quickly returns to his unhygienic ways, prompting Sadie to her ability on him again. Jess eventually convinces Seth to remove Sadie's power, resulting in Sadie and Finn's breakup. |
| Ally | 4.2 | Eleanor Wyld | Ally is a blind girl who develops a telepathic connection with her guide dog as a result of the storm. She is enrolled in a sculpture class for blind people at the community centre, tasked with sculpting Curtis's face until Ally requests a change in partners after discovering Curtis's race via her guide dog. Rudy becomes her partner and quickly convinces Ally to have sex with him. He discovers her power after he tries to take advantage of her blindness by using cling wrap and elastic bands in lieu of a proper condom, ending with Rudy defending Curtis and admonishing Ally for her racism, and Ally carving the word "cunt" into her sculpture of Rudy's head. |
| Lola | 4.2, 4.3, 4.4 | Lucy Gaskell | Lola is introduced as a trainee probation worker and is seen flirting with Curtis in the community centre. She convinces Curtis that Jake is her violent ex-boyfriend who is stalking her, and Curtis accidentally Jake. Lola then disappears and Curtis discovers she was not a trainee probation worker, and she was an actress named Debby who stayed in character as Lola after the storm hit. Lola tried to convince her new lover Pete that Curtis was a violent ex-boyfriend, however Pete was not convinced. Curtis eventually kills Lola by biting her in his zombified state, and Curtis takes his own life. |
| Jake | 4.4 | Andrew Gower | Jake was an ex-boyfriend of Lola's. He is murdered by Curtis due to Lola's machinations, however Curtis uses his power of Resurrection to bring Jake back from the dead and interrogate him. After Jake tells Curtis the truth behind Lola's character, he succumbs to his thirst for blood, infecting Curtis before being killed again by Finn. |
| Grace | 4.5 | Charlie Murphy | Grace is Finn's biological half sister that he met while searching for his biological father, Dan. Before letting Finn see her father, Grace told him that he is sick. After Finn had left, Grace came to check on Dan and used her Life Preservation power to keep him alive. Dan told her that she couldn't keep him alive forever. Dan is in a lot of pain and wants to die but Grace won't allow him to. He hires a nurse and convinces Finn to take Grace out that night so he can die peacefully which Finn agrees to. Finn tries numerous times that night to tell her of Dan's intentions but always gets interrupted. The next morning, Grace comes back to her home and is preparing to use her power to save her father again. Finn arrives and tells Grace what their father wanted him to tell her. Grace thinks Finn is lying and tries to strangle Finn with the cord from a lamp, but soon stops, telling Finn that she only kept Dan alive for herself. Dan wakes up and has a final conversation with his daughter and son. After that, Grace and Finn leave Dan's body at the apartment and Finn leaves. |
| Richard Saunders | 4.6 | Alex Austin | Richard Saunders is an old school friend of Rudy's, often mentioned as being one of the craziest people he has ever known. Saunders, a habitual drug user prone to throwing parties, was affected by the storm, giving him the power to manifest his LSD trips into reality. The most notable occurrence created an anthropomorphic white rabbit, which waits outside Saunder's flat attacking his party goers as Saunders himself hides in a cupboard. The rabbit is eventually killed by Abbey and Saunders is berated by the gang for his behaviour. |
