= Craig Parkinson =

British actor

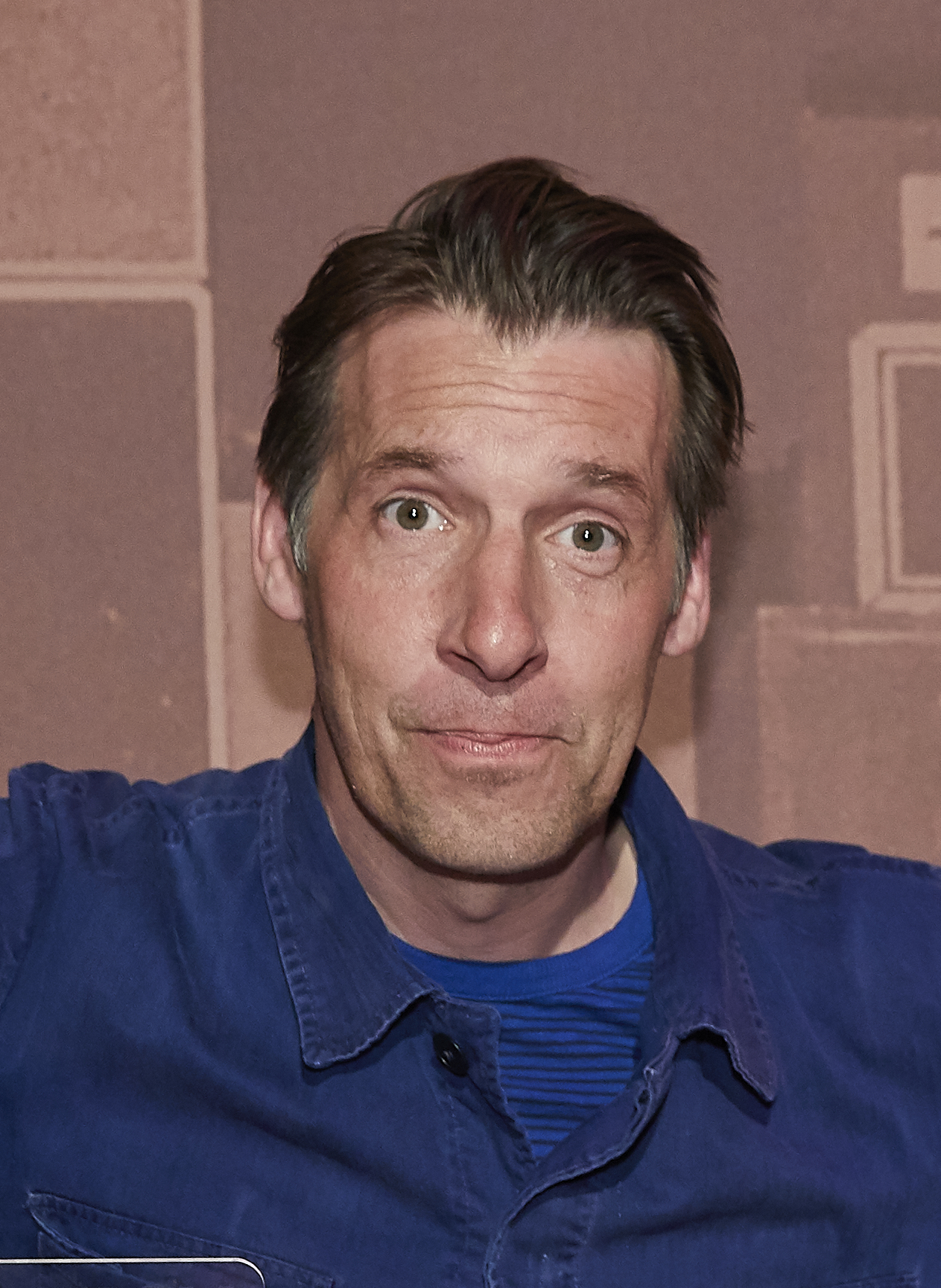
- Parkinson in 2018
- Born: 11 March 1976 (age 50); Blackpool, Lancashire, England
- Education: Mountview Academy of Theatre Arts
- Occupations: Actor; podcaster
- Known for: Control; Line of Duty; Four Lions
- Spouse(s): Susan Lynch (m. 20??; sep. 2019)
- Children: 1

Craig Parkinson (born 11 March 1976) is an English actor and podcaster. He has played Shaun in the E4 series Misfits, twins Jimmy and Johnny Kray in the ITV series Whitechapel, and DI Matthew "Dot" Cottan in Line of Duty. He has also acted in several independent films, including Control, Soulboy, The Unloved and Four Lions.

== Early life ==
Parkinson was born in 1976 in Blackpool, Lancashire. He began acting at an early age in school plays. He studied at Blackpool and The Fylde College before moving to London aged 17 to attend the Mountview Academy of Theatre Arts.

== Acting career ==
Parkinson's early roles were small parts in long-running British television series such as Dalziel and Pascoe, The Bill, and Holby City. He made his film debut in Control (2007), a biopic of Joy Division singer Ian Curtis in which he played the role of Tony Wilson. He starred in the 2008 independent film The Taxidermist, playing The Taxidermist. The film won several awards, including Palm Springs International Short Film Festival 'Best Live Action Film over 15 minutes' and Rhode Island International Horror Film Festival 'Best Short Film'.

In 2009 he played the abusive care worker Ben in the television drama The Unloved, the directorial debut of Samantha Morton. Parkinson had previously starred alongside her in Control. The Unloved also featured Lauren Socha, with whom Parkinson would later star alongside in Misfits, as well as his wife, Susan Lynch.

In 2010 Parkinson played twins Jimmy and Johnny Kray in the ITV television series Whitechapel. The role involved a boxing scene which he prepared for by taking boxing lessons and going on a no-carb diet. He played Alan in the film SoulBoy and Cubitt in the film Brighton Rock. Towards the end of 2010 he began playing the probation worker Shaun in the E4 television series Misfits. He continued this role throughout 2011.

In 2011 he starred in the independent film Ghosted, playing the psychotic and violent prisoner Clay. The film also starred John Lynch, Parkinson's brother-in-law, and Martin Compston, with whom Parkinson had previously starred in Soulboy. In the same year, Parkinson played Tommy Flynn in the BBC sitcom In with the Flynns. Parkinson's character was described as "the star of the show" by David Butcher of the Radio Times and "the standout character of the show" by Harry Hamburg of On the Box.

In 2011 Parkinson appeared as DS Matthew 'Dot' Cottan in the BBC Two series Line of Duty.

In 2012 he appeared as the Reverend Horace in the BBC supernatural thriller The Secret of Crickley Hall, adapted from the novel of the same name written by James Herbert. The Secret of Crickley Hall also featured his wife. Parkinson also starred in the music video for the song "Two Fingers" by Jake Bugg.

In 2013 he starred in the ITV1 comedy drama series Great Night Out as Glyn. He also appeared as Charles Crout in Channel 4 drama The Mill.

He reprised his role as Matthew 'Dot' Cottan in 2013 for the second series of Line of Duty, and in 2015 for the third series. Cotton was promoted to the rank of DI, known now as DI Dot Cotton.

In 2015, he originated the role of Inspector Fry in Martin McDonagh's play Hangmen, which premiered at the Royal Court Theatre before transferring to London's West End after a sold-out run, and being broadcast by National Theatre Live. He also played the compassionate missionary Dougie Raworth in Indian Summers.

In 2017, he appeared on the panel show Would I Lie to You?. Parkinson also starred as The Piano Man (Si) in the action/comedy drama Wild Bill.

In 2021, he guest-starred in several episodes of Series 13 of Doctor Who, as the Grand Serpent.

== Podcasting ==
Parkinson hosted the Two Shot Podcast, episodes of which typically featured interviews with actors. The Guardian favourably reviewed the podcast, describing it as the "antithesis of a luvvie-darling discussion" and Parkinson himself as a "natural interviewer". It won best culture podcast at the 2018 British Podcast Awards. The podcast is sometimes recorded at live events, such as Paddy Considine's episode at North by Northwich compered by The Charlatans.

In 2021, Parkinson hosted the "Obsessed with... Line of Duty" podcast for series 6 of Line of Duty on BBC Sounds.

== Personal life ==
In his youth, Parkinson lived in Camden and Crouch End before moving to Gloucestershire with his wife. He was married to actress Susan Lynch and they have a son. They separated in 2019.

== Filmography ==
=== Television ===
Year	Title	Role	Notes
2001	Dalziel and Pascoe	Paul Collingwood	Series 6, Episode 2: "Home Truths"
2002	Attachments	Darren	Series 2, Episode 10: "Logan's Run"
2002	The Bill	Detroitz	Series 18, Episode 71 and 72
2002–2003	Ed Stone Is Dead	Scotty Wilmslow	Series 1, Episodes 1, 9, 10, and 11
2003	Holby City	Gaz Simpson	Series 5, Episode 29: "Desperate Measures"
2004	No Angels	Mick	Series 1, Episode 1
2004	Hustle	Art Tutor	Series 1, Episode 5: "A Touch of Class"
2004	Black Books	Martin the Tout	Series 3, Episode 4: "A Little Flutter"
2004	Born and Bred	Eric	Series 3, Episode 6: "And Is There Still Honey for Tea?"
2005	The Inspector Lynley Mysteries	Simon Dawkins	Series 4, Episode 1: "In Divine Proportion"
2007	Lead Balloon	Simon Russell	Series 2, Episode 6: "Debacle"
2008	Lark Rise to Candleford	Young Amos	Series 1, Episode 3
2008	The Passion	Man at Tomb	Episode 4
2010	Whitechapel	Jimmy Kray/Johnny Kray	Series 2
2010–2011	Misfits	Shaun	Series 2; Series 3, episodes 1–5
2011	In with the Flynns	Tommy Flynn	Series 1
2012	The Secret of Crickley Hall	Reverend Horace	Episode 3
2013	Endeavour	Reg Tracepurcel	Series 1, Episode 3: "Rocket"
2013	Great Night Out	Glyn	
2013	The Mill	Charles Crout	
2014	Prey	DI Sean Devlin	
2012–2021	Line of Duty	DS/DI Matthew 'Dot' Cottan	Series 1, 2, 3, 4, 5, 6.
2016	Uncle	Cyril	
2016	Resistance	Captain David McLeod	
2015–2016	Indian Summers	Dougie Raworth	Series 1 and Series 2, all episodes
2018	Killed by My Debt	Bailiff	
2018	Sick of It	Neil	Series 1, Episode 1
2018	Watership Down	Sergeant Sainfoin	Voice role
2019	Year of the Rabbit	Patrick Levant	Series 1, Episode 5
2019	Wild Bill	Piano Man	Series 1, Episode 2: "Piano Man"
2019	Temple	Keith Sullivan	Series 1, Episodes 3, 4, 5, 6, and 8
2020	The English Game	James Walsh	Series 1
2020–2021	Sandylands	Terry Chino	
2021–2024	Grace	DS Norman Potting	
2021	Intergalactic	Dr. Benedict Lee	
2021	Doctor Who	The Grand Serpent	Series 13
2022	Vera	Phil Swann	Series 11
2022	Life and Death in the Warehouse	Danny	Television film
2022	Everything I Know About Love	James	3 episodes
2023	Mrs Sidhu Investigates	DCI Peter Burton	
2024	Renegade Nell	Sam Trotter	
2024	Alma's Not Normal	Richard	Episode: "The Black and White Movie"

=== Film ===
Year	Title	Role	Notes
2007	Control	Tony Wilson	
2007	Virgin Territory	Tindaro	
2008	The Other Man	George	
2009	The Taxidermist	The Taxidermist	Short film
2009	The Unloved	Ben	TV film
2009	Desert Flower	Neil	
2010	Four Lions	Matthew 'Matt' Jaggard	
2010	SoulBoy	Alan	
2010	Brighton Rock	Cubitt	
2011	When the Lights Went Out	Brian	
2011	Ghosted	Clay	
2016	The Flag	The Don	See IMDB for more.
2018	Black Mirror: Bandersnatch	Peter Butler	Standalone film from TV series Black Mirror
2019	Wild Rose	Alan	

=== Theatre ===
Year	Title	Role	Notes
1998	Martin Guerre	Ensemble	Prince Edward Theatre
2000	Much Ado About Nothing	Watchman	Open Air Theatre, Regent's Park.
2000	The Pirates of Penzance	Policeman	Open Air Theatre, Regent's Park.
2000	A Midsummer Night's Dream	Francis Flute	Open Air Theatre, Regent's Park.
2006	Measure for Measure	Provost	Complicité/National Theatre
2006	Everything is Illuminated	Alex Perchov/Sofiowka	Hampstead Theatre, London. Based on the novel by Jonathan Safran Foer, adapted by Simon Block.
2011	Ecstasy	Len	Hampstead Theatre, London
2015	Hangmen	Inspector Fry	Royal Court Theatre and Wyndham's Theatre, London
