= Nathan Young =

Fictional character

- Misfits character
- First appearance: Series 1 Episode 1
- Last appearance: Vegas Baby! (online film); Series 3 Episode 8 (flashback)
- Created by: Howard Overman
- Portrayed by: Robert Sheehan
- Born: 15th of March, 1989
- Power: Immortality (series 1-2); Mediumship (series 2); Reality warping (webisode)

In-universe information
- Gender: Male
- Occupation: Charity collector (Christmas Special); Vegas Swindler (Vegas Baby!)
- Nationality: Irish
- Father: Mike Young
- Mother: Louise Young
- Brother: Jamie Young
- Step-father: Jeremy
- Partner: Marnie
- Step-Son: Nathan Jr

Nathan Young is a fictional character from the British Channel 4 science fiction comedy-drama Misfits, portrayed by Robert Sheehan. He first appeared in Series 1 Episode 1 and departed in a webisode entitled "Vegas Baby!" after Sheehan quit the role. He serves as one of the main protagonists of the show. Nathan is given community service where he is caught up in a storm which gave him the power of immortality. Nathan has also been involved in a romantic relationship with Kelly Bailey (Lauren Socha). Sheehan was nominated for a BAFTA for his role as Nathan.

== Casting and character creation ==
Casting for the part was announced on 17 August 2009 by Digital Spy. Fellow cast member Iwan Rheon revealed that Overman who created the character discussed how to write their parts with the cast and later began writing for them as actors. Misfit's executive producer Petra Fried announced Robert Sheehan's decision to leave at the Kapow convention in London on 10 April 2011. His departure was addressed in an online webisode titled Vegas Baby! that debuted on the Misfits website on 15 September. On his decision to leave Sheehan said "It's nice that the show's successful but it doesn't mean complete blind and unadmonished loyalty - 'If something is very successful you should stick to it like a barnacle!' That's definitely not my thinking. I think I've made the right decision, yeah". On a possible return Sheehan said "There's no point in saying never. It holds a very fond little place in my heart. No, it's been a great big part of my life and there's no point in turning your back on something completely. I'm not doing that, I would never say never".

== Development ==
=== Characterisation ===
E4's official website describes Nathan as having "an answer for everything, sarcastic wit, and a fondness for pushing things too far" and that "underneath the cocky quips and sarcasm, Nathan isn’t as unemotionally untouchable as he makes out". Tim Dowling of The Guardian described him as the "Irish one who talks too much" of the group of "foul-mouthed young criminals". Digital Spy described him as a "smart aleck". The Metro described him as "hyperactive" and "irritating as hell". The Independent described Nathan as "cheeky" before later branding him "the annoying gobby lad".

== Storylines ==
Nathan steals some pick 'n' mix from a bowling alley and continues to aggravate the situation. He causes a disruption and when the manager threatens to phone the police he tells him to do so before stapling him in the hand. Nathan is given community service for this disruption. While on his first day of community service, Nathan is caught in a storm. He appears unaffected, unlike those he is doing community service with. Nathan's mother, Louise (Michelle Fairley), kicks him out of his house for his behaviour towards his step-father, Jeremy (Jo Stone-Fewings). Nathan begins living in the community centre. The group kill Tony (Danny Sapani/Louis Decosta Johnson), as an act of self-defense, and bury him. Nathan sleeps with Ruth (Amy Beth Hayes/Clare Welch) who he discovers has been affected by the storm and is really 82 years old. In an alternate timeline, the group are killed because Curtis Donovan (Nathan Stewart-Jarrett) used his power of time travel to change the events, preventing him from ending up in community service; Nathan, however, survives and is told that when found by paramedics he was almost dead. Rachel (Jessica Brown Findlay) begins manipulating people into behaving how she wants through her power of suggestion. Nathan kidnaps Rachel using a gun and takes her to the roof of the community centre. She can't or won't revert those back to their original state and she realises Nathan's gun is only a water pistol. She and Nathan brawl before both falling to their deaths. After Nathan's funeral he wakes up in his coffin, realising he is immortal.

The group dig Nathan up after they receive a message from Superhoodie. Lucy (Evelyn Hoskins) begins causing trouble for the gang. Kelly Bailey (Lauren Socha) agrees to have sex with Nathan after months of flirting. Lucy, who is a shape shifter, takes on Kelly's form and causes trouble between the pair. Nathan discovers he has a younger brother, Jamie (Sam Keeley). Jamie and Lily (Catrin Stewart) join the group at a nightclub where they take drugs, reversing their powers. Lily's power of cryokinesis is reversed to pyrokinesis and while in a car with Jamie she sets fire to it, killing them both. Nathan, who also has the power of mediumship, sees Jamie's ghost who leads him to his father and they decide to give their relationship another try. Nathan falls in love with Simon Bellamy (Iwan Rheon) after Vince (Nathan Constance) uses his power to tattoo people and control how they feel. Nathan and Kelly decide to consummate their relationship, but Kelly changes her mind when she decides that it would be best if they were just friends. Nathan is killed and deduces it was Jessica (Zawe Ashton) who killed him. When Jessica shows interest in Simon, Nathan tries to warn him off, but Simon does not believe him. They later realise Dave (Adrian Rawlins) is responsible. Brian (Jordan Metcalfe) goes public about his power. The group are exposed and become famous. Brian becomes jealous of the group's fame and begins killing them. He reduces Nathan to a state of vegetation although Curtis rewinds this timeline. Nathan begins a relationship with Marnie (Gwyneth Keyworth), who is pregnant but has no clue who the father of her child is. To support her and her baby, he sells his power of immortality to Seth (Matthew McNulty). As a result of this Nikki (Ruth Negga) is killed. The group steal money that Elliot (Edward Hogg) has collected while falsely claiming to be Jesus Christ reborn to buy new super powers.

In Vegas Baby! Nathan along with Marnie and Nathan Junior are staying in Vegas. Using his new power he begins scamming the casinos by using his power to make the dice land on all the right numbers. He is caught out when he uses his power to cheat to get eleven on the dice although he uses the numbers four and seven. He runs back to the hotel room but is eventually caught where he bids farewell to Nathan Junior. Nathan, now in an orange jumpsuit, is imprisoned and uses his one free call to phone Simon. Rudy Wade (Joseph Gilgun) picks up and states that he is the new guy and he doesn't know a Barry before hanging up. Nathan is last seen being dragged away from the phone by the police to a cell while shouting "Save me, Barry!"

== Reception ==
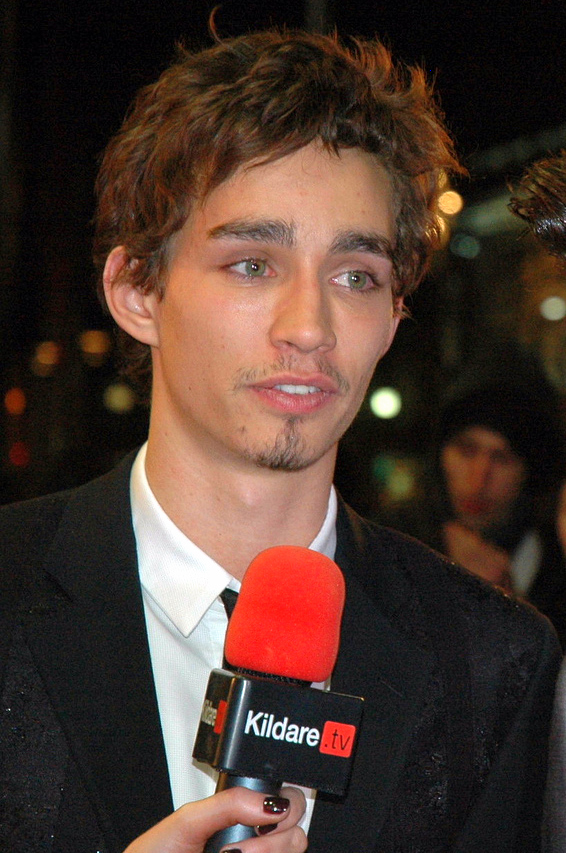
Robert Sheehan's performance as Nathan has received critical acclaim.

Sheehan was nominated for a BAFTA for his portrayal of Nathan but lost out to Martin Freeman who stars in Sherlock. Sheehan was nominated for Outstanding Actor in the fiction category at the Monte-Carlo Television Festival in 2011. The Herald described him as a "curly haired Irish smart alec called Nathan (Robert Sheehan), to whom writer Howard Overman has given all the best lines". The Guardian also commented that "So far his only power seems to be the gift of incessant back-chat. Played by Robert Sheehan, he's the breakout star of the show". The Daily Telegraph describes him as "Motormouth Nathan was the pivot here, prodding, challenging and provoking the others into revealing themselves". The Independent responded to the character saying he was "clearly the most quotable of the quintet". After Nathan decides to join the circus so he can be repeatedly killed they added "Quite right: who'd really get all superhero-ish just because they've got some powers?" The Metro described him as a "cult hero". MSN News described Nathan saying he was "undoubtedly the star of the show".

The Guardian described Sheehan as the "leading light of E4's Asbo superheroes drama", describing him as a "cocky motormouth" before questioning "Can Misfits survive without Nathan?" After the character's exit was confirmed, Digital Spy commented that he was "much-loved". Keith Watson of the Metro commented positively on his exit saying "rather than dismiss this key character with a couple of lines of mumbled dialogue, his farewell is deftly handled in an online mini-drama all of his own" saying his time on the show was spent "bemoaning being short-changed in the superpower department – finally cashes in the chips on his shoulder" before adding "he’s going to leave a Misfits-shaped hole in my heart". Neela Debnath of the Independent spoke of Sheehan's departure upon the beginning of the third series saying the absence of Nathan, who she described as "universally popular and well-liked", was the "starkest" difference in the series. Debnath expressed that although for a large number of people Nathan was "the most entertaining character on the show" because of his "schoolboy humour and penchant for annoying everyone but the audience" his departure did not detract from the quality of the show. The Guardian branded Nathan their "favourite cocky yet lovable and immortal character" but after Rudy's entrance questioned "As for that void after Nathan left? Well… Nathan who?"
