= The Unloved =

2009 television film

- DVD cover
- Written by: Samantha Morton; Tony Grisoni
- Directed by: Samantha Morton
- Starring: Molly Windsor; Susan Lynch; Robert Carlyle; Lauren Socha; Michael Socha; Craig Parkinson
- Country of origin: United Kingdom
- Original language: English

Production
- Running time: 106 minutes
- Budget: £1.5 million

Original release
- Network: Channel 4
- Release: 17 May 2009

The Unloved is a 2009 British television film starring Molly Windsor, Robert Carlyle, Susan Lynch and Lauren Socha. It is about an eleven-year-old girl called Lucy (Windsor) growing up in a children's home in the UK's care system, and is shown through her perspective. It is the directorial debut of Golden Globe Award-winning and two-time Academy Award-nominated actress Samantha Morton. The story is semi-autobiographical, Morton wrote and produced the film in collaboration with screenwriter Tony Grisoni.

It was produced for Channel 4 and shown as part of its Britain's Forgotten Children series, and was first broadcast on 17 May 2009. The film drew an audience of two million viewers. It had a premiere at the 2009 Toronto International Film Festival and received a limited release in 2010.

== Cast ==
- Molly Windsor – Lucy
- Susan Lynch – Mother
- Robert Carlyle – Father
- Lauren Socha – Lauren
- Craig Parkinson – Ben
- Andrea Lowe – Vicky
- Kerry Stacey – Social worker
- Michael Socha – Michael
- Katie Withers – Jules

== Production ==
Filmed entirely on location in Morton's hometown of Nottingham, the film cost £1.5 million to make. The title of the film was inspired by a newspaper article Morton had read about children in the foster care system. Morton spent time in other cities such as Newcastle, Glasgow and around London although she decided it was best to make a film about the world she knew and grew up in. Originally wanting to set the film in 1989, Morton later decided against it as she wanted to focus on the struggles of the present day and did not want audiences to write it off as a historical piece.

== Awards ==
The film won Robert Carlyle a Scottish BAFTA for best TV actor in November 2009. On 10 May 2010 it was announced that the film had been nominated for 'Best Single Drama'; Lauren Socha was nominated for a BAFTA for Best Supporting Actress. On 6 June 2010, The Unloved won the BAFTA for Best Single Drama.

== Critical reception ==
The Telegraph's Michael Deacon gave the film a positive review describing it as "Riveting" and "Powerful from start to finish"; On the other hand, he stated the film was "Stomach churning" and "Hard to watch"; however to his surprise he could not take his eyes off the film and praised Morton on creating an "Intense" and "Vivid" dramatic film.

== Home media ==
As of May 2011, it is available on DVD from Oscilloscope.
