= Kelly Bailey (Misfits) =

- Misfits character
- First appearance: Series 1 Episode 1
- Last appearance: Series 3 Episode 8
- Created by: Howard Overman
- Portrayed by: Lauren Socha
- Power: Telepathy (series 1–2); Specified superhuman intelligence (series 3); Time Travel (series 3, episode 4)

In-universe information
- Gender: Female
- Occupation: Street cleaner
- Significant others: Nathan Young (crush, later friend); Seth (boyfriend)

Kelly Bailey is a fictional character in the British Channel 4 science fiction comedy-drama Misfits, portrayed by Lauren Socha. Kelly appeared from episode 1 of series 1 to episode 8 of series 3. For her portrayal, Socha won a BAFTA.

== Casting and character creation ==
Casting for the part was announced on 17 August 2009 by Digital Spy. On the part Socha said Kelly was "brilliant" before adding "I love her. I love playing the part". Socha later added "I do like playing Kelly – she's a bit outgoing and says it how it is, when I was younger I was a bit like her, a bit chavvy" before adding that she thought the character was "likeable, isn't she?" Fellow cast member Iwan Rheon revealed that Overman who created the character discussed how to write their parts with the cast and later began writing for them as actors.

=== Characterisation ===
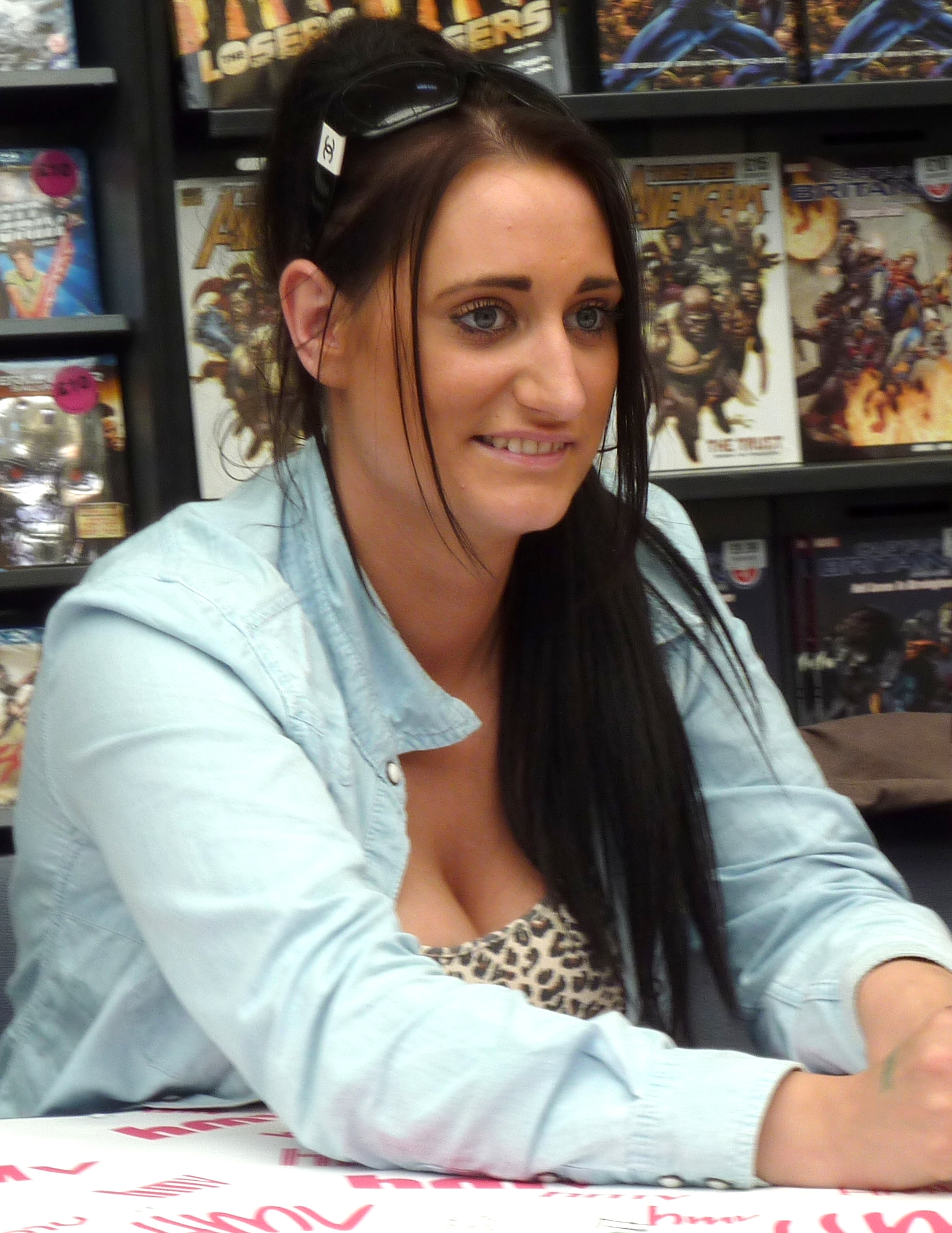
Lauren Socha (pictured) uses her natural Derby accent for the part which she discussed with production on how strong to make.

E4's official website describes Kelly as "wading in fist first. Her attitude is her suit of armour, accessorised with enough gold jewellery to really do some harm, and acrylics that could have your eyes out. Behind that veneer though, Kelly’s got a heart of gold and is fiercely loyal." The Times commented that she was "the chavish girl who can read minds". The Daily Telegraph describes her as "bolshy Midlands chav Kelly". Socha described the character as "Kelly is a standard beeyatch. She's wicked." and admitted she can relate to the character. The Independent described Kelly as the "slap-happy female "chav" who can read other people's thoughts". MSN News described Kelly as "deadpan". They added that her initial power is because she is "Self-conscious of her image" but that her later power is useless as "no employer will take her seriously because of her scraped back hair and working class East Midlands accent". They added that she is the "perfect foil" to Nathan. Kelly has been described as having a "chav accent". Socha uses her natural Derby accent for the part. Socha has admitted she has to discuss how strong to make her accent for the part and said she finds it "tricky" using her accent "because I can say things and I just sound stupid when I say them".

== Storylines ==
Kelly is given community service for starting a fight with Jodi (Bunmi Mojekwu). Kelly begins community service with other young offenders Nathan (Robert Sheehan), Simon (Iwan Rheon), Curtis (Nathan Stewart-Jarrett), Alisha (Antonia Thomas) and Gary (Josef Altin). While doing community service, she is caught in a storm and receives the power of telepathy. Probation worker Tony (Danny Sapani/Louis Decosta Johnson) is also caught in the storm and becomes overcome by rage. He attacks the group and kills Gary, so Kelly retaliates and kills him in self-defense. Kelly helps dispose of the bodies. Kelly fights with Jodi again when they must try to overcome their differences as part of Kelly's community service. Kelly becomes bald as Jodi has the power to project temporary alopecia when she becomes angry. Kelly becomes part of the 'Virtue' organization when Rachel (Jessica Brown Findlay) changes her personality. When trying to stop Rachel's influence over those she has changed, Nathan is killed along with Rachel, ending her influence of Kelly. Kelly is upset by Nathan's death.

Kelly is told to go to Nathan's grave where she discovers that he is immortal. She saves him and the pair decide to have sex. Nathan is rude towards Kelly after Lucy (Evelyn Hoskins) shape shifts into Kelly and is rude towards Nathan. Kelly takes drugs which invert her power so she begins broadcasting her thoughts, in particular feelings for Nathan telling him she is scared he will hurt her and she thinks she may love him. Tattoo artist Vince (Nathan Constance) makes Kelly fall in love with him after she questions his involvement in Nathan falling in love with Simon. Vince's influence ceases after Simon realises Vince's nut allergy, so he force feeds him a peanut and refuses to give him his epinephrine pen. Nathan and Kelly attempt to have sex, but Kelly decides to remain friends. Kelly is kidnapped by Tim (Matt Cross). The others arrive but are also kidnapped and chained. Alisha escapes and later frees the others. Kelly meets and has sex with Bruno (Richard Riddell), a gorilla who has taken on a human appearance. Bruno is later shot by police. The groups' abilities are exposed after Brian (Jordan Metcalfe) becomes public about his own abilities. Brian becomes jealous of other people with abilities, so he decides to gain recognition by killing those with similar abilities. Kelly is killed and through Nathan's mediumship warns him of Brian's plans. Curtis reverses time and Kelly is revived. Kelly sells her power to Seth (Matthew McNulty) for £20,000. The group decides to regain their powers after Nikki (Ruth Negga) is killed, which could have been prevented had they had their powers. They decide to purchase different powers from their original powers.

Kelly gains the power of specified human intelligence which means she can design rockets, although she initially thought the power would give her intelligence in more than one area. An elderly man travels back in time and changes the past so that the Nazis win the war. Kelly helps to undo these changes and she and Seth share a kiss. Jen, a comatose patient, switches places with Kelly. Kelly is eventually freed when she and Jen switch places again. Kelly and Seth begin a relationship. Seth asks Curtis to resurrect Shannon (Charlene McKenna), Seth's ex-girlfriend. Seth ends his relationship with Kelly. The group realise Shannon is a zombie, so they decide to kill her. Seth stops them but Shannon later hears Seth and Kelly speaking and decides to kill Kelly. Shannon is about to attack Kelly when Seth kills Shannon. Kelly and Seth admit their love for each other. Jonas (Mark Heap) brings several spirits back from the dead including Rachel and Tony. Tony chases Kelly who attacks him with a fire extinguisher. Tony apologises for trying to hurt Kelly after he was caught in the storm. After Rachel tells the group they have corrupted her, Kelly aggravates her. Rachel threatens the group with a stanley knife and soon after, kills Alisha. Kelly is upset by Alisha's death although she rejects Curtis's idea to resurrect her as she will become a zombie. Kelly and Seth go on holiday. In Uganda, Kelly defuses a landmine using her power when a boy steps on it. She and Seth decide to stay in Uganda to help defuse landmines. Seth returns to England to collect their belongings and after helping Rudy and Jess take away Finn's girlfriend's power he returns to Uganda with Kelly's belongings.

== Reception ==
Tim Dowling of The Guardian described her as the "chavvy one" of the group of "foul-mouthed young criminals".

Neela Debnath of The Independent commented that it "does not make sense" that her power "has not elevated her intelligence to the levels of MENSA" and that while Kelly can "draw complex blueprints for rockets" it was odd that "she does not know what brunch is". Debnath added that "maybe her power will serve a purpose eventually".

On Kelly's relationship with Seth, Debnath said it was "satisfying" adding that the pair have "an underplayed chemistry which works because both of them are guarded characters, neither of whom wants to lose face". She added that "It was nice to see Kelly’s love life resuscitated after her disappointing ‘like-a-cousin’ moment with Nathan and her fleeting romance with Bruno, the escaped monkey who turned into a human but ended up getting shot".

The Guardian commented on Kelly saying she has been "once more been a wonderful character to watch" adding that a highlight was her "trying to convince an official of her new superpower that gives her the ability to design inter-continental ballistic missiles ("Yeah mate, check out the propulsion system. It's liquid nitrogen – it's wicked")".

Debnath felt that the character's offscreen exit in which Kelly "seems something very unlike the character". Morgan Jeffrey of Digital Spy wrote that Kelly's exit was "a somewhat unlikely farewell for Lauren Socha's loveable loud-mouth". Simon Cocks of MSN also reacted unfavourably to the method in which Kelly was written out, describing it as a "lowlight" of the episode explaining: "The explanation of Kelly's whereabouts is necessary, but still feels odd and forced. I have a hard time believing she'd really decide to go to Africa to defuse bombs".
