= Misfits (TV series) =

British science fiction comedy-drama television show

- Genre: Action; Black comedy Drama; Science fiction Superhero fiction
- Created by: Howard Overman
- Written by: Howard Overman; Jon Brown; Mike O'Leary
- Creative director: Mollie Sian Smith
- Starring: Iwan Rheon; Robert Sheehan; Lauren Socha; Nathan Stewart-Jarrett; Antonia Thomas; Joe Gilgun; Karla Crome; Nathan McMullen; Natasha O'Keeffe; Matt Stokoe
- Opening theme: "Echoes" by The Rapture
- Ending theme: "Main Titles" by Vince Pope
- Composer: Vince Pope
- Country of origin: United Kingdom
- Original language: English
- No. of series: 5
- No. of episodes: 37 (list of episodes)

Production
- Executive producers: Howard Overman; Murray Ferguson; Matt Jarvis; Petra Fried
- Producers: Kate Crowe; Matt Strevens; Nick Pitt
- Production location: London
- Camera setup: Single-camera
- Running time: 45 minutes
- Production company: Clerkenwell Films

Original release
- Network: E4
- Release: 12 November 2009 – 11 December 2013

Misfits is a British science fiction comedy-drama television programme that aired on E4. The show premiered on 12 November 2009 and concluded on 11 December 2013 in its fifth series. Misfits is about a group of young offenders sentenced to work in a community service programme who obtain supernatural powers after a strange electrical storm.

== Production ==
The first series of Misfits started broadcasting in the UK on 12 November 2009 on E4 and was produced by Clerkenwell Films. The programme aired in Australia in 2010 on ABC2, and in New Zealand, it screened on FOUR. In June 2011, it was made available online in the United States via Hulu, where it became one of the service's most-watched programmes.

Recording for the second series began on 24 May 2010, next to Southmere Lake, Thamesmead, Bexley, Southeast London. The second series aired from 11 November 2010 to 16 December 2010 on E4. A Christmas special, written by Howard Overman, featuring the first series’ main cast, was broadcast on E4 in December 2010. The first series won the 2010 BAFTA Television Award for Best Drama Series. The third series began airing on 30 October 2011, and ended on 18 December 2011. The fourth series premiered in October 2012, and the fifth in October 2013.

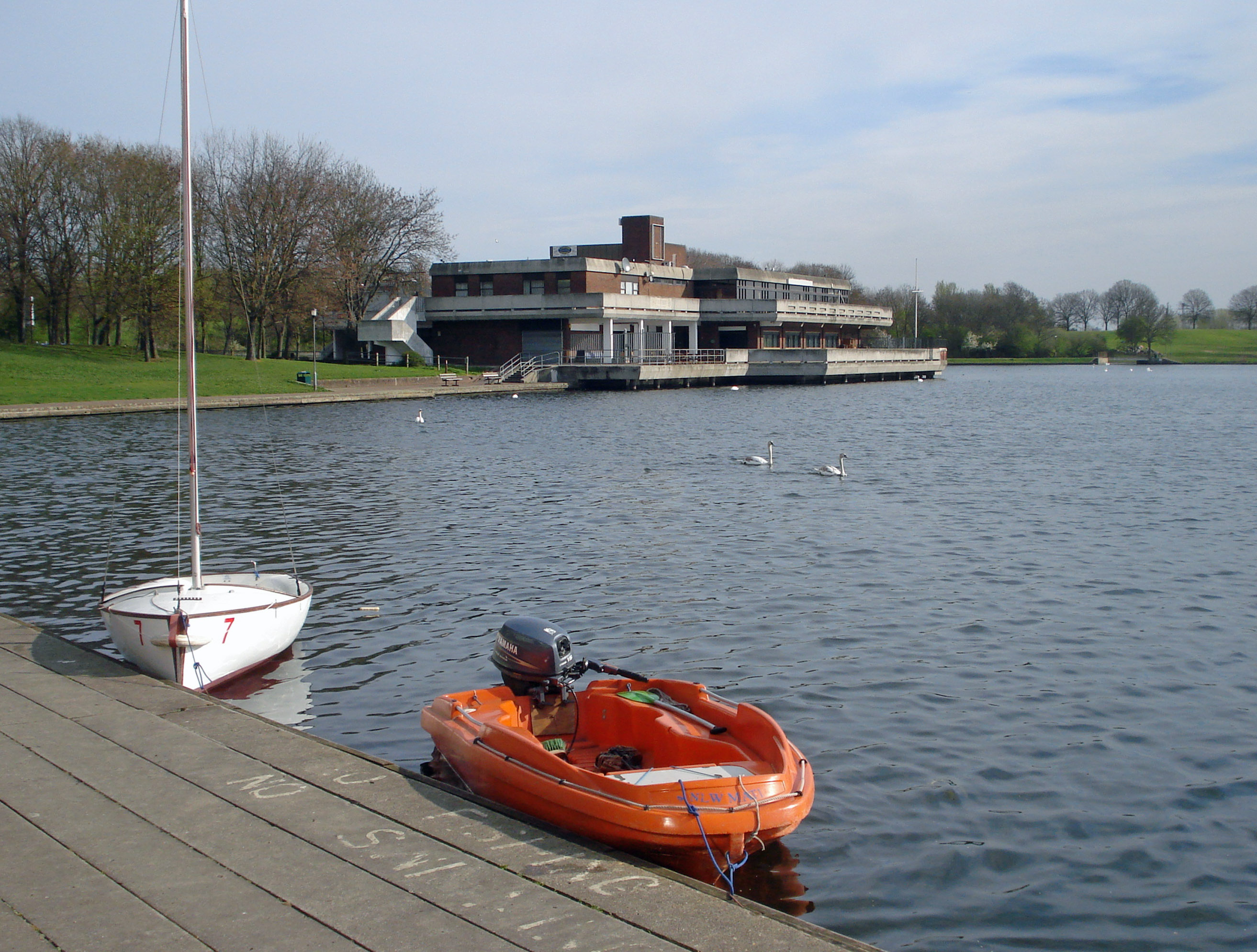
Southmere community centre was used as a filming location for Misfits.

=== Marketing ===
The first series was accompanied by online viral marketing on social networking websites such as Facebook and Twitter. For example, in a British first, the characters Simon and Kelly tweeted during the initial transmission of each episode, with the content of the tweets provided by writers Sam Liefer and Ben Edwards under the direction of lead writer Howard Overman and executive producer Petra Fried. These tweets and other website postings provided additional narrative material and, amongst other things, did not ultimately reveal the identity of a key character who appeared only in episode six. Since then other characters have appeared, such as Rudy Wade and Alisha Daniels, as well as a fan-based "observer" character named "That Guy". Additional strategic components included direct-to-YouTube video clips and an online game based on the show.

== Cast and characters ==
Antonia Thomas, Iwan Rheon, Lauren Socha, Nathan Stewart-Jarrett, and Robert Sheehan are introduced as Alisha Daniels, Simon Bellamy, Kelly Bailey, Curtis Donovan, and Nathan Young respectively. Sheehan left after the second series and was replaced in the third by Joseph Gilgun as Rudy Wade. After the third series, it was announced that Rheon, Thomas, and Socha had left and would be replaced by new cast members Karla Crome, Nathan McMullen and Matt Stokoe, as Jess, Finn, and Alex respectively. Midway through the fourth series, Stewart-Jarrett left while Natasha O'Keeffe joined the cast as Abbey Smith.

Character	Portrayed by	Series				
Character	Portrayed by	Season 1 (2009)	Season 2 (2010)	Season 3 (2011)	Season 4 (2012)	Season 5 (2013)
Main
Curtis Donovan	Nathan Stewart-Jarrett	Main (Note: Stewart-Jarrett is credited through season 4 episode 4.)	Main	Main	Main	
Simon Bellamy	Iwan Rheon	Main	Main	Main		
Kelly Bailey	Lauren Socha	Main	Main	Main		
Alisha Daniels	Antonia Thomas	Main	Main	Main		
Nathan Young	Robert Sheehan	Main	Main	Guest (Note: Sheehan appears in the online short episode "Vegas Baby!" which is a prequel to the third season, and is credited in episode 8 of season 3, although he only appears in archival footage.)		
Rudy Wade (Note: Gilgun appears throughout as both Rudy and Rudy Too and appears as Dark Rudy in season 4 episode 3.)	Joseph Gilgun			Main	Main	Main
Jess	Karla Crome				Main	Main
Finnley Aran Samson	Nathan McMullen				Main	Main
Abbey Smith	Natasha O'Keeffe				Main (Note: O'Keeffe first appears in season 4 episode 6.)	Main
Alex "From the Bar"	Matt Stokoe				Recurring (Note: Stokoe is missing from the opening titles but is credited with the main cast in the end credits throughout the fourth season, starting with episode 2.)	Main
Recurring
Sally	Alex Reid	Recurring	Guest	Guest		
Pete	Michael Obiora	Recurring	Guest			
Tony Morecombe	Danny Sapani	Recurring		Guest		
Louise Young	Michelle Fairley	Recurring				
Mike Young	Dexter Fletcher	Guest	Guest			
Gary	Josef Altin	Guest		Guest		
Rachel	Jessica Brown Findlay	Guest		Guest		
Shaun	Craig Parkinson		Recurring (Note: Although not listed in the opening credits, is listed below the rest of the main cast and before the guest stars in the closing credits.)	Recurring		
Nikki	Ruth Negga		Recurring			
Seth	Matthew McNulty		Guest	Recurring	Recurring	
Lily	Catrin Stewart		Guest	Guest		
Tim	Matt Cross		Guest			Recurring
Melissa	Kehinde Fadipe			Recurring		
Marnie	Gwyneth Keyworth		Guest	Guest		
Lola	Lucy Gaskell				Recurring	
Nadine	Gillian Saker				Recurring	
Sadie	Imogen Doel				Recurring	
Greg	Shaun Dooley				Recurring	Recurring
Sam	Michael Winder					Recurring
Maggie	Ruth Sheen					Recurring
Helen	Ellie Kendrick					Recurring
Stuart	Oliver Lansley					Recurring
Karen	Kate Bracken					Recurring

== Episodes ==
Series	Episodes	Originally released	
Series	Episodes	First released	Last released
1	6	12 November 2009	17 December 2009
2	7	11 November 2010	19 December 2010
3	8	30 October 2011	18 December 2011
4	8	28 October 2012	16 December 2012
5	8	23 October 2013	11 December 2013

The first series comprised six episodes, airing from 12 November to 17 December 2009 on E4. The second series started filming in May 2010 and aired on E4 from 11 November to 16 December 2010. This series had seven episodes, including a Christmas episode.

An exclusive short film, "Vegas Baby!"', premiered on E4's official website on 15 September 2011, focusing on Nathan's departure. The third series began airing on 30 October 2011 on E4. It introduced a new character, Rudy (Joe Gilgun), and was eight episodes long. Unlike the first two series, Howard Overman did not write all the episodes, instead writing six of the eight with Jon Brown writing the other two. Series four began on 28 October 2012, introducing new characters Finn, Jess, Greg, Alex and Abbey. This series also saw the departures of Seth and Curtis. Like series three, Howard Overman penned six episodes, and Jon Brown wrote the remaining two. Series four came to a close on 16 December 2012.

== Story overview ==
=== Series 1 (2009) ===
Misfits follows five delinquents on community service at a community centre who are caught outside during a supernatural thunderstorm and who acquire special abilities. Initially, the show focused on five young adults, each gaining a superpower which mirrors their character. Kelly Bailey (Lauren Socha)—constantly judged for her class ("chav")—gains the ability of telepathy, Curtis Donovan (Nathan Stewart-Jarrett)—trying to escape a mistake from his past—can rewind time after experiencing an immense sense of regret, Alisha Daniels (Antonia Thomas)—a woman who is extremely comfortable with her sexuality and body—sends people into a sexual frenzy when they touch her skin and Simon Bellamy (Iwan Rheon)—often ignored or not acknowledged—can become invisible. Nathan Young (Robert Sheehan) appears unchanged.

The group are attacked by their probation officer, Tony, who was driven insane when he acquired his strange powers in the electrical storm and is accidentally killed by Kelly in self-defence. The main plot of the first series is the five trying to stop anyone else from finding out about the death. Tony's replacement, Sally, is revealed to be Tony's fiancée, and she suspects that the gang know more than they claim to. Sally's suspicion grows, and she forms a relationship with Simon, secretly pretending to like him to get information from him about Tony's disappearance. She steals his mobile phone, which has the video of Nathan saying they killed Tony, sees it, and tries to convince Simon to go to the police. When she tries to get away, Simon turns invisible, intentionally unnerves her while doing so, and then accidentally kills her in the struggle for his mobile.

Other subplots of the series involve Nathan living in the community centre after his mother kicks him out of her house, Alisha and Curtis becoming involved in a relationship, Curtis accidentally changing time so he never split up from his ex-girlfriend Sam, Nathan trying to figure out what his power could be, and Simon's sense of loneliness and isolation from the rest of the group.

After disposing of Sally's body, the delinquents discover the Virtue cult, a group of young people who have begun adopting ultra-conservative behaviour. Nathan and Simon find that this is the fault of Rachel, a conservative young woman who gained the power of suggestion due to the storm. During a struggle on a rooftop, both Rachel and Nathan are killed, and the brainwashed youths are freed. As his friends mourn, Nathan's power is finally revealed to be immortality as he awakens in his coffin, unharmed and buried alive.

=== Series 2 (2010) ===
As the gang approaches the end of their community service, they are stalked by a mysterious masked man who had previously saved Nathan from the Virtue cult. He assists them through dangerous situations and is seemingly aware of events that take place before they happen and saves members of the group on multiple occasions, such as revealing to Kelly that Nathan is still alive, saving Curtis from being strangled to death by a shapeshifter, saving Nathan from a car explosion when taking drugs makes him temporarily mortal, and saving Alisha from a mugger. When Alisha is attacked a second time, she is taken back to the masked man's safe house. It is revealed that he is a time-travelling, future Simon, with whom Alisha falls in love and learns she is to fall in love with the present Simon. Future Simon warns of an unspecified, upcoming crisis and shows that the superpowers will soon become public knowledge– which eventually occurs, only for that timeline to be erased. Future Simon sacrifices himself to save Alisha, prompting Alisha to reveal the truth to present Simon.

Throughout the series, subplots include Nathan discovering his immortality extends to mediumship, Nathan and Kelly's abortive attempt at a relationship, Curtis and Alisha breaking up, Simon slowly becoming more assertive and comfortable with himself, and Curtis starting a relationship with a girl named Nikki, who obtained her teleportation power from a heart transplant.

Three months later, the Misfits give up their powers by selling them to Seth, a former drug dealer who can transfer powers from one person to another. Elliot, a disillusioned priest, purchases several powers from the same dealer, including Alisha's and Nikki's, and uses them to pose as a reborn Jesus Christ. While the Misfits are celebrating the fact that they are free from their powers, a follower of "Jesus" holds up the bar where Curtis and Alisha are now working, robs them, and kills Nikki. The Misfits steal the money Elliot has gathered from his followers to purchase their powers back, accidentally killing him while doing so. Curtis attempts to repurchase his power so that he can save Nikki from the shooting. However, Seth informs him that his power has already been given to an old Jewish man who wanted to kill Hitler and change history. The Misfits use the money to buy new powers from Seth, with Kelly being the first to volunteer.

=== Series 3 (2011) ===
Simon, Kelly, Alisha and Curtis acquired new powers following their encounter with Seth; Simon can glimpse into the future, Kelly has complete knowledge of rocket science and mechanical systems, and Alisha has a form of clairvoyance which allows her to see through the eyes of others and Curtis can change into a woman at will. Nathan is absent, having gone to Las Vegas hoping his new magic ability will make him a millionaire. A young man on community service named Rudy, with the ability to split himself into two separate people based on the different aspects of his personality, meets the gang when he upsets a woman, causing her to use her power to freeze people within proximity to wreak havoc on Rudy. Rudy's actions accidentally put Simon, Kelly, Alisha and Curtis back into community service. Major subplots include Simon and Alisha's relationship, Simon's progressive transformation into his 'future self', Rudy's womanising and philandering, Curtis's experimentation as a female, Kelly's infatuation and eventual relationship with Seth, and Seth's obsessive search for a mysterious power. Additional minor plots include Simon being manipulated by a cartoonist with a time-altering power and Alisha pushing him not to become "the man in the mask". Someone with a time travel power fails to kill Hitler, resulting in the Nazis winning World War II, causing an alternate time stream where the misfits are a band of rebels. Rudy contracts a superpower-made STD in the confusion of a club, going on a hunt to find the person responsible.

Seth eventually finds what he is looking for: the power of resurrection. He gives it to Curtis in exchange for his sex-change power after Curtis accidentally impregnates himself. Curtis uses his power to resurrect Seth's ex-girlfriend, Shannon, who died of a drug overdose that Seth feels responsible for. Seth breaks up with Kelly and returns to Shannon but quickly realises that anyone resurrected has an all-encompassing desire for blood, essentially rendering them a zombie. Seth and the gang manage to defeat Shannon and the others infected by the power, resulting in Seth and Kelly restarting their relationship and eventually deciding to travel to escape the mayhem of the community centre.

A medium uses his power to inadvertently bring the spirits of Tony, Sally and Rachel back to haunt the gang, with the spirits unable to move on due to having unfinished business. Sally and Tony move on to the afterlife after they reconcile, and Rachel tries to fit in with the culture that she despises by swearing, drinking, trying drugs and having sex, but is unsuccessful. She realises that she is back for revenge, slicing Alisha's throat with a Stanley knife and moving on. After Alisha's death, Seth helps Simon to go back in time, allowing Simon to help the gang in the past and resulting in Simon's eventual death in Alisha's arms. Back in the present day, Rudy, Kelly and Curtis agree to keep their heads down and continue their community service.

=== Series 4 (2012) ===
After Alisha's death and Simon's departure to the past, Kelly and Seth travel to Africa, where Kelly uses her knowledge of mechanical systems to defuse land mines, and end up staying. Curtis and Rudy continue with community service, joined by Finn, an anxious telekinetic, and Jess, a snarky, reserved girl with x-ray vision. Major subplots include Rudy and Finn moving into the community centre together, Finn's one-sided infatuation with Jess, Curtis's encounters with Lola, a mysterious woman who claims to be a trainee probation worker, Finn's search for his father, and Jess's relationship with Alex, "From the Bar", a mysterious bartender who spends most of his time looking for his penis, lost as a result of a mysterious power. As a result of his encounters with Lola, Curtis uses his resurrection power again, leading to his infection. To stop his increasing thirst for blood, Curtis commits suicide, emotionally affecting Rudy as a result.

After Curtis's suicide, the gang encounters Abbey, a girl who suffers from amnesia as a result of the storm and later joins the group on community service, and Nadine, a nun with a mysterious secret whom Rudy falls in love with. Alex finds and retrieves his penis, but his regained sense of masculinity causes him to cheat on Jess, angering Finn. Nadine's power is eventually revealed to be the ability to inadvertently summon the Four Horsemen of the Apocalypse when surrounded by anger or violence, which she does after witnessing Alex and Finn arguing over Jess. The Horsemen attack the gang and stab Alex when he steps in to protect Jess. Nadine sacrifices herself to stop the Horsemen from wreaking more havoc, leaving Rudy heartbroken again. As a result of the Horsemen's attack, Alex is rushed to the hospital to receive an emergency lung transplant.

=== Series 5 (2013) ===
As a result of his lung transplant, Alex inherits the power to remove others' powers through sexual intercourse. He is placed on community service after breaking and entering the community centre to save the group. A major arc of the series sees him coming to terms with his new power as he learns to use it to help others and become less selfish. Another story arc has Rudy's sensitive emotional duplicate, Rudy Two, joining a support group for those affected by the storm. The group's leader, Maggie, is an older woman with the ability to knit jumpers of the future; her jumpers include a depiction of what Rudy Two believes to be him and a group of powered individuals seemingly using their powers in an act of heroism. Rudy Two becomes obsessed with the first jumper and encounters people whom he believes to be on the jumper, including Sam, a young man with the power to fly, Helen, a young woman with the ability to emit and control electricity, and Karen, a woman with the power to camouflage. The gang runs into Tim, a man from Series 2 who sees reality as if it is a video game and is now struggling to keep his power under control. Abbey begins a relationship with a man called Mark, who is trapped inside a tortoise's body, and Rudy and Jess also start a relationship. Rudy struggles to tell this to Finn who is trying to get over his crush on Jess.

During the series, the gang confronts a group of Satanic scouts, and Finn becomes possessed with the power to convert people to Satanism. As he slowly converts each member of the gang, Alex is forced to use his power and remove Finn's Satanic power. Throughout the series, Alex also takes away someone's power that causes accidents to always happen, the power to turn objects inside out, and the power to hypnotise men with the user's breasts. Rudy discovers that his father is affected by a very similar power to his own, as he runs into a very violent duplicate of his father. Abbey discovers that she is the manifestation of a girl named Laura's power to bring imaginary characters to life, thus explaining why she does not remember anything from before the Storm. Rudy Two is the victim of a man who has the power to swap ages, forcing him to the brink of death, and Finn finds a new love interest who can download her consciousness into other people's minds, trapping them in a virtual world within her computer. Finn also becomes the victim of a young man who can steal the will to live from other people, just as Alex is the victim of a gipsy curse, which makes him feel as if he is drowning whenever he refuses to help someone.

On the first anniversary of the Storm, Rudy Two and Abbey hold a birthday party which unleashes chaos as people begin to realise that ecstasy reverses their powers. All the powers that Alex has taken are placed into one girl, Sarah, while Jess is blinded, and Mark briefly becomes human again. With the powers of Satanic conversion, object inversion and hypnotic breasts, Sarah begins to wreak havoc on the party, killing Mark by turning him inside out and successfully converting all of the gang but Alex to Satanism. With no options left, Alex is forced to kill Sarah by using her newfound power of being accident-prone against her. Rudy Two and Helen, who have begun a relationship, are attacked by Tim, who can no longer control his power. Karen saves the duo by stabbing Tim in the back, and Rudy Two and all three bury him under the flyover before they, along with Sam, agree to become "proper" superheroes.

In the finale, Rudy and Jess have difficulties in their relationship due to Rudy not being there for her when she needs him. Jess ends up sleeping with a man she meets at the bar, Luke, who uses his power to throw them both forward in time by a year, where Jess has had Luke's baby, Leo. Jess demands to be returned to the present, and when Luke refuses, she escapes his flat to go and find the rest of the gang. In the year that has passed, Finn has started working as a trainee probation worker, Alex is still working at the bar, and Abbey has been holding a sign for a golf sale that doesn't exist. When most of the gang are assembled in the bar and have overcome their shock at Jess's reappearance (they all thought she was dead due to her disappearance), Rudy reappears, looking shabby due to his grooming regimen having gone out the window. Rudy and Jess reconcile, and Rudy agrees to love her baby "as though he was [his] own".

Meanwhile, Rudy Two's "Jumper Posse" have gone off the rails and begun to kill people. After a failed attempt on Finn's life, the Misfits assemble to deal with the Rudy Two's delinquent gang. Rudy Two confronts Helen about her betrayal in the community centre but is knocked out by Karen. As the rest of this Misfits gang approach, they are attacked by Sam. Alex grabs Sam and takes his power from him via sexual intercourse mid-flight, causing them both to fall. Alex lands in a skip and survives the fall, but Sam is less than fortunate, hitting the pavement with immense force. When the gang enter the community centre (except for Jess, who stays outside with Leo), they are then attacked by Karen, who uses her camouflage and a knife in tandem with each other. As she is about to kill Alex, Finn uses his telekinesis to launch a piano at her in an unusual display of brilliance. Helen then appears, intent on killing the gang, before Rudy Two intervenes. After a brief exchange, Rudy Two rejoins Rudy, who tells Helen that together, "they are twice as strong" (although this really has no truth). As Helen readies herself to kill them both, Rudy stalls for time and begins to pee himself, creating a trail of urine from him to Helen. Helen electrocutes Rudy but is fried herself as her electric current travels back to her through Rudy's stream of urine. Helen dies quickly, but Rudy lies gravely injured in the gang's arms. Rudy gives Jess a scratch card, having won a quid on it, and tells Jess to look after the baby before dying himself.

The gang bury him, and Jess returns to Luke's flat before committing suicide. Luke finds her body and throws them back in time to just before they first meet. Jess sees a video from her future self in the bar toilets telling her everything that happened. Jess reluctantly has sex with Luke to conceive Leo before killing him and reconciling with Rudy. Jess also informs Rudy Two of how the "Jumper Posse" will begin to murder people. Rudy Two shuts down his superhero operations before they start, opting to travel with Helen instead. On the community centre's roof, with their community service finally over, the Misfits gang agree to become proper superheroes after hearing Jess's story.

== Reception ==
=== Critical response to Series 1 ===
British reviews were positive. The Times gave it four out of five stars, calling it "a new union – salty British street humour with whizz-bang special effects" which should "keep E4's core audience happy". An online review by The Guardian's Richard Vine said that it was "confident enough to operate in its own universe and set up something new" and that it was aimed at slowly presenting us the "real people" behind a seemingly "tabloid stereotype" of the "ASBO teenager", while also noting that the series Skins also used such a technique for their show. The Guardian's print reviewer Tim Dowling was enthusiastic, saying: "Misfits is indeed silly – sillier, even, than it sounds – but it's also brilliant: sharp, funny, dark and, in places, quite chilling. Both the writing and the performances ensure that everything but the preposterous central premise remains entirely believable." The Daily Telegraph called attention to Howard Overman's script, which it said, "sparkled from the off, introducing his posse of social outcasts as a bunch of total losers, but each one distinctively and memorably so. (2009) "

The Irish media were also impressed with the show. The Evening Herald called the debut episode "dark, hilarious, exciting and beautifully produced". It went on to say that "the spark comes from Overman's razor-sharp script, yet a lot of the credit also has to go to the well-chosen young cast, who are uniformly superb."

=== Television ratings ===
==== Series 1 ====
The first series averaged 707,500 viewers per episode.

Episode	Airdate	Viewers			Rank	
Episode	Airdate	E4	E4+1	Total	E4	E4+1
1	12 November 2009	574,000	213,000	787,000	No. 4	No. 9
2	19 November 2009	569,000	169,000	738,000	No. 2	No. 11
3	26 November 2009	592,000	88,000	680,000	No. 1	No. 11
4	3 December 2009	632,000	78,000	710,000	No. 5	No. 11
5	10 December 2009	598,000	72,000	670,000	No. 8	No. 21
6	17 December 2009	592,000	68,000	660,000	No. 6	No. 21

==== Series 2 ====
The second series averaged 1,462,000 viewers per episode.

Episode	Airdate	Viewers			Rank	
Episode	Airdate	E4	E4+1	Total	E4	E4+1
1	11 November 2010	1,185,000	238,000	1,423,000	No. 1	No. 5
2	18 November 2010	1,055,000	250,000	1,305,000	No. 1	No. 2
3	25 November 2010	1,119,000	251,000	1,370,000	No. 1	No. 4
4	2 December 2010	1,075,000	341,000	1,416,000	No. 1	No. 2
5	9 December 2010	1,074,000	355,000	1,429,000	No. 1	No. 1
6	16 December 2010	1,201,000	392,000	1,593,000	No. 2	No. 1
Christmas Special	19 December 2010	1,420,000	278,000	1,698,000	No. 1	No. 3

==== Series 3 ====
The Third series averaged 1,515,125 viewers per episode.

Episode	Airdate	Viewers			Rank	
Episode	Airdate	E4	E4+1	Total	E4	E4+1
1	30 October 2011	1,471,000	323,000	1,794,000	No. 1	No. 2
2	6 November 2011	1,329,000	296,000	1,625,000	No. 4	No. 4
3	13 November 2011	1,176,000	322,000	1,498,000	No. 1	No. 3
4	20 November 2011	1,142,000	300,000	1,442,000	No. 1	No. 3
5	27 November 2011	1,050,000	249,000	1,299,000	No. 2	No. 11
6	4 December 2011	1,246,000	252,000	1,498,000	No. 1	No. 6
7	11 December 2011	1,178,000	284,000	1,462,000	No. 1	No. 6
8	18 December 2011	1,227,000	276,000	1,503,000	No. 1	No. 7

==== Series 4 ====
Episode	Airdate	Viewers			Rank	
Episode	Airdate	E4	E4+1	Total	E4	E4+1
1	28 October 2012	777,000	239,000	1,016,000	No. 2	No. 6
2	4 November 2012	619,000	208,000	827,000	No. 5	No. 9
3	11 November 2012	—N/a	256,000	727,000	—N/a	No. 4
4	18 November 2012	—N/a	—N/a	678,000	—N/a	—N/a
5	25 November 2012	—N/a	251,000	760,000	—N/a	No. 9
6	2 December 2012	—N/a	—N/a	732,000	—N/a	—N/a
7	9 December 2012	—N/a	—N/a	778,000	—N/a	—N/a
8	16 December 2012	688,000	—N/a	840,000	No. 9	—N/a

==== Series 5 ====
Episode	Airdate	Viewers			Rank	
Episode	Airdate	E4	E4+1	Total	E4	E4+1
1	23 October 2013	616,000	—N/a	804,000	No.7	—N/a
2	30 October 2013	—N/a	—N/a	582,000	—N/a	—N/a
3	6 November 2013	—N/a	—N/a	729,000	—N/a	—N/a
4	13 November 2013	602,000	—N/a	782,000	No. 9	—N/a
5	20 November 2013	—N/a	—N/a	699,000	—N/a	—N/a
6	27 November 2013	—N/a	—N/a	638,000	—N/a	—N/a
7	4 December 2013	—N/a	—N/a	654,000	—N/a	—N/a
8	11 December 2013	—N/a	—N/a	729,000	—N/a	—N/a

=== Awards ===
Both the series and its writer Howard Overman were nominated in the 'Drama Series' and 'Drama Writer' categories for the RTS Awards in March 2010. The series won the 2010 BAFTA Television Award for Best Drama Series. Lauren Socha has won "Best Supporting Actress" for her part as Kelly. The show was also nominated for "Best Comedy Drama" at the British Comedy Awards in 2011 but lost to Psychoville.

== International broadcast ==
Misfits began airing in the US on Logo TV on 19 July 2012. On 29 October 2012, Misfits started airing exclusively on Hulu for its American audience, immediately following the UK broadcast. The Italian web series Freaks! (the second season of which was also broadcast on television) has partially been inspired by Misfits; this is apparent in some episodes in which Misfits is quoted (there is also a scene set in England with actors dressed in community service suits).

In France, Misfits began airing in November 2010 on OCS Choc, then in May 2012 on TF6 and November 2016 on Numéro 23. In Québec, the series has been broadcast online since March 2011 on Tou.tv.

== In other media ==
=== Potential film ===
Work started on a film in 2013 but it was tabled in 2014.

Overman reportedly wrote a "first draft of a script" for a Misfits feature film. Iwan Rheon, an early member of the cast, has stated that the movie is "quite likely" to happen if they can re-unite the cast and that he would be an "idiot not to return".

On 18 September 2014, cast member Antonia Thomas reported that the film was probably not going to happen, stating, "There was all sorts of talk about it. We read scripts and I think it's now not happening, I haven't heard anything. I think it's just difficult to get everybody together. Everybody is doing such different things. Maybe they think everybody has moved on, I don't know. You never say never but I have not heard anything of it of late". Iwan Rheon later commented: "It looked like it was really going to happen at one stage, but it's gone away now. I don't know exactly why or what's going on. It would've been nice to do for old times' sake. It's been a while now since we did it and it would've been nice to work with [the old cast] again."

=== US remake ===
An American version was put in development in 2016 at Freeform from a spec script that had been shopped around as early as 2012.

On 6 June 2017, Freeform pressed forward with a pilot. The remake was to follow a similar premise to the original British programme. Ashleigh LaThrop, Tre Hall, Allie MacDonald and Jake Cannavale, were cast in the pilot, following the lives of Alisha (LaThrop), Curtis (Hall), Kelly (MacDonald), and Nathan (Cannavale). On 7 July 2017, Charlie Saxton was cast in the role of Simon, and Dave Foley was cast as Bernie, a dishevelled driver.

It was announced that the programme would be produced by Josh Schwartz and Stephanie Savage's Fake Empire. Diane Ruggiero-Wright wrote the adaption and was to serve as showrunner. Victoria Mahoney was to make her directing debut with the pilot episode. Howard Overman, creator of the UK series, and Murray Ferguson, who produced the original version, were also to be involved with the project. Fake Empire executive Lis Rowinski was to serve as co-executive producer.

In November 2018, Vulture noted that Freeform had not made any further announcements in over a year and doubted that the network would find a place for the programme in its family-friendly programming.
