= Kehinde Fadipe =

British actress and writer (born 1983)

- Born: 17 January 1983 (age 43); London, England
- Children: 2

Kehinde Fadipe (born 17 January 1983) is a British-Nigerian actress and writer.

== Early life ==
Kehinde Fadipe was born at St Mary's Hospital, London in 1983. She gained a BA (Hons) in English Literature & Language before taking a second degree at the Royal Academy of Dramatic Art which she completed in 2009.

== Career ==
Fadipe's first major role was in 2009 when she appeared in the Lynn Nottage's drama Ruined which won the Pulitzer Prize. Nottage's story is based around sexual violence in the Democratic Republic of Congo. In 2011 she took a part in the BBC television crime story The Body Farm which was based on Patricia Cornwell's 1994 book The Body Farm. She joined the third series of the teen drama Misfitss where she played Melissa who was the female gender swap (power) of the male character Curtis. Curtis was played by Nathan Stewart-Jarrett.

Her debut novel was published in 2023 under the title In Such Tremendous Heat with Dialogue Books (Little Brown/Hachette) and The Sun Sets in Singapore with Grand Central Publishing (Hatchette)

== Personal life ==
She has two children.
