= Lauren Socha =

English actress (born 1990)

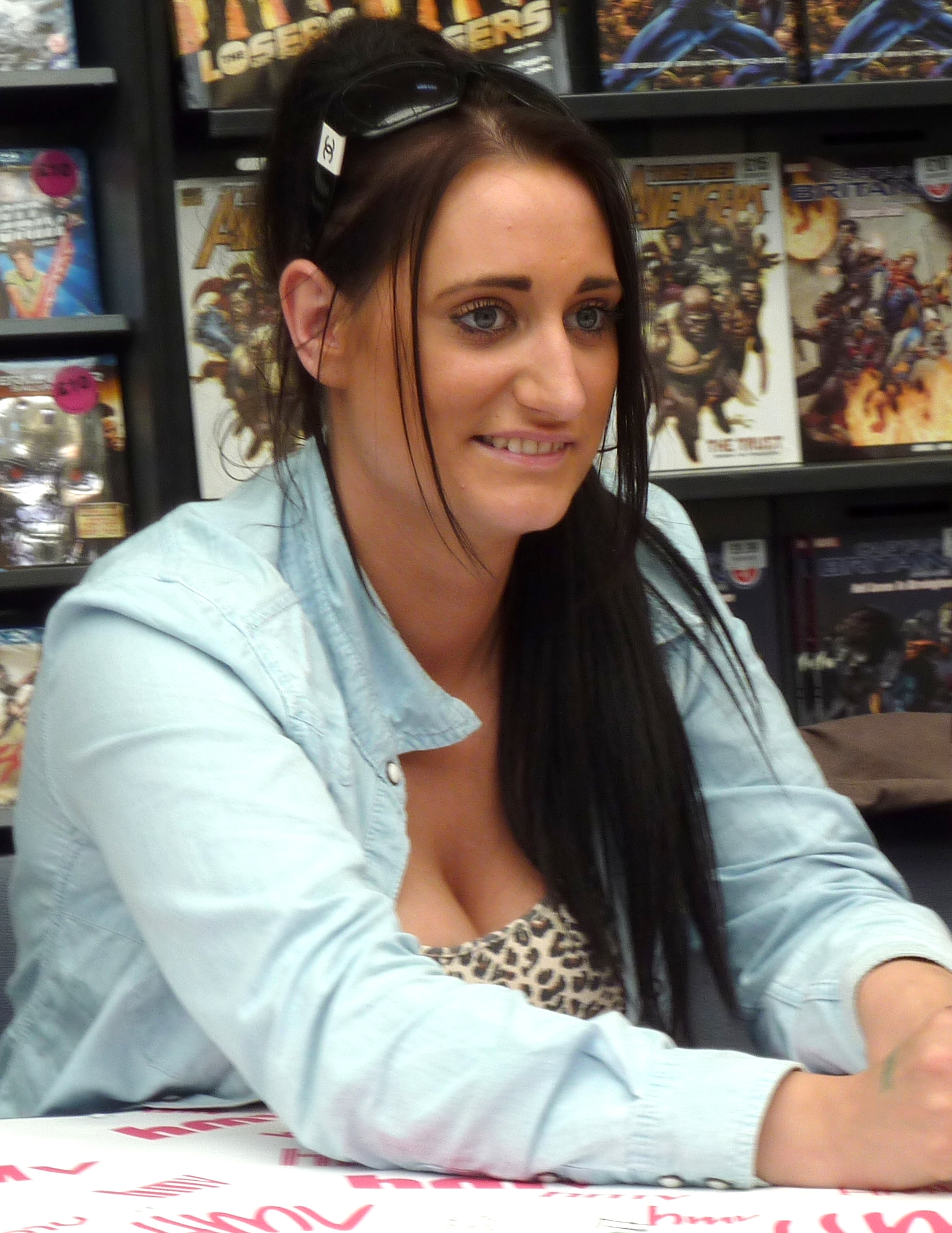
- Socha in 2011
- Born: 9 June 1990 (age 36); Derby, Derbyshire, England
- Occupation: Actress
- Years active: 2006–present
- Known for: Comedy-drama television series Misfits
- Children: 3
- Relatives: Michael Socha (brother)

Lauren Marie Socha (born 9 June 1990) is an English actress. She rose to prominence during her role as Kelly Bailey in the E4 comedy-drama television series Misfits, for which she won a BAFTA TV Award in the Best Supporting Actress category. She is also known for her role as Lauren in the Channel 4 television film The Unloved.

== Early life ==
Socha was born in Derby, Derbyshire to Robert and Kathleen (née Lyons) Socha. Her mother is English and her father was British of Polish/Italian parents. She has an older brother, Michael Socha, also an actor. She attended St. George's RC Primary School, Burton College and St. Benedict's Catholic School and Performing Arts College, Derby. She trained at the Central Junior Television Workshop based in Nottingham.

== Career ==
Socha was first recognised by agents and casting directors when she attended a local drama workshop, having been inspired by her older brother. This led to her being cast as the lead in the Arctic Monkeys' video for their 2006 single "When the Sun Goes Down" at the age of 15.

In 2009, Socha went on to star in Samantha Morton's directorial debut The Unloved in which she played a sixteen-year-old girl in a care home. She was nominated for a BAFTA for Best Supporting Actress for her role.

In 2010, Socha starred alongside Tim McInnerny in the short film Missing. She also had a minor role in the television mini-series Five Daughters, based on the Ipswich serial murders.

In May 2011, she won a BAFTA in the Best Supporting Actress category for her role of Kelly in Misfits. Socha was nominated for Outstanding Actress in the fiction category at the Monte-Carlo Television Festival in 2011. She later appeared in the short The Child, playing a version of Marilyn Monroe. She also took part in the BBC learning project "Off By Heart Shakespeare" where she played Juliet from Romeo and Juliet, performing the speech: "Blistered be thy tongue".

She also appeared in five episodes of Catastrophe as the babysitter and in 2017 and 2020 played one of the sisters in comedy series The Other One.

== Personal life ==
Socha lives in Derby. Her brother, Michael Socha, is also an actor.

In April 2016, it was announced via Twitter that she had given birth to a girl.

=== Criminal conviction ===
On 23 January 2012, it was reported that Socha had been charged with racially aggravated assault in connection with an incident involving a Derby taxi driver the previous October. On 2 May 2012, Socha pleaded guilty to the charge, and was sentenced to four months in prison, suspended for 12 months.

== Filmography ==
Year	Film	Role	Notes
2006	Scummy Man	Nina	Short
2008	Summer	Tracey	Independent Film
2009	The Unloved	Lauren	TV film Nominated—BAFTA TV Award for Best Actress in a Supporting Role
2009–2011	Misfits	Kelly Bailey	Main cast: Series 1-3; BAFTA TV Award for Best Actress in a Supporting Role
2010	Missing	Sarah	Short
2010	Five Daughters	Dawn	3 episodes
2010	71 Degrees North	Herself	
2011	The Child	Marilyn Monroe	Short
2012	Joint Enterprise	Deena	
2014	Plebs	Amanda	Episode: "The Chariot"
2015–2019	Catastrophe	Anna	5 episodes
2017	Fanged Up	Ms Renfield	Feature Film
2018	Strangeways Here We Come	Shelley	
2018	Urban Myths	Amy	Episode: "Public Enemy"
2019	Shed of the Dead	Bobbi	
2020–2022	The Other One	Catherine "Cat" Walcott	12 episodes

=== Music Videos ===
Year	Song	Artist	Role
2005	When the Sun Goes Down	Arctic Monkeys	Prostitute
2021	Excuses	Mentis	DJ

== Awards and nominations ==
Year	Work	Award	Category	Result	Ref.
2010	The Unloved	BAFTA TV Awards	Best Supporting Actress	Nominated	
2011	Misfits	BAFTA TV Awards	Best Supporting Actress	Won	
2011	Misfits	Golden Nymph Awards	Outstanding Actress - Drama Series	Nominated	
