= Finn (Misfits) =

Finn Samson
- Misfits character
- First appearance: Series 4 episode 1
- Created by: Howard Overman
- Portrayed by: Nathan McMullen
- Power: Telekinesis

In-universe information
- Gender: Male
- Occupation: Unemployed
- Father: Dan Woolaston
- Mother: Mary Samson
- Half Sister: Grace

Finn Samson is a fictional character from the British Channel 4 science fiction comedy-drama Misfits, portrayed by Nathan McMullen. Finn was created to replace Antonia Thomas and Iwan Rheon, who played Alisha Daniels and Simon Bellamy, after they departed the show. Finn began appearing from series 4 episode 1, in which he was introduced alongside Jess (Karla Crome). McMullen was cast in the role after having previously auditioned for a smaller role but after impressing producer he was asked to play the regular role of Finn. Finn is described as having a "childlike naively optimistic view of life" and as someone who "talks a lot and often uses this to try and talk himself out of difficult or awkward situations". Finn has the power of telekinesis, "but he doesn’t really know how to use it". Writing for The Independent, Neela Debanth said she finds Jess more likeable than Finn although "there is more to Finn on closer inspection". Morgan Jeffrey of Digital Spy said that McMullen "makes a strong first impression" while Jordan Farley of SFX said Finn has his "moments to shine" but that he ultimately "fails to make a big impression". Simon Cocks, writing for MSN, said Finn and Jess "fit into the dynamic perfectly".

== Casting and character creation ==
The character of Finn was announced on 1 March 2012, with Finn created as one of three characters to replace departed cast members Antonia Thomas and Iwan Rheon, who played Alisha Daniels and Simon Bellamy respectively. Actors being considered for the role were aged between eighteen and twenty-five. On May 22 it was announced that Nathan McMullen had secured the role of Finn. McMullen had previously auditioned for a smaller role in series three of Misfits but after impressing the producer he was asked to play the regular role of Finn.

== Characterisation ==
A casting call for Finn described him as having a "childlike naively optimistic view of life, he’s always eager to please and enthusiastic about life. Finn talks a lot and often uses this to try and talk himself out of difficult or awkward situations. He is very funny". Finn has the power of telekinesis, "but not in an A-list kind of way". McMullen described the character, saying: "He’s quite naive, but he’s eager to please. He wants to be your friend, but he tries too hard, and I think that relates to his power. He’s telekinetic, but he doesn’t really know how to use it. He’ll sit at home for two hours a night attempting to use this power and move a pencil an inch. As a person he’ll hopefully realise he doesn’t need to try as hard to please people and likewise, with his power, he doesn’t need to try as hard to use it, otherwise it won’t work properly". Producer Matt Strevens told a reporter at SFX that Finn "has a dark secret that is revealed" and "what we find out is that his secret informs who he is". Morgan Jeffrey of Digital Spy called the character a "cheeky, baby-faced Liverpudlian". SFX's Jordan Farley described Finn using the tagline "Lovable. Liverpudlian. Loser", while Claire Webb of Radio Times described him as "motor-mouthed Finn".

== Storylines ==
Finn arrives for his first day of community service where he meets fellow young offender Jess (Karla Crome). Rudy Wade (Joseph Gilgun) impersonates their probation worker. Using her X-ray vision, Jess sees that Rudy has Curtis Donovan (Nathan Stewart-Jarrett) locked inside a freezer and they then help him escape. Rudy believes that Michael (Nathaniel Martello-White) had sent Finn and Jess. Michael had previously arrived at the community centre with a suitcase of money and used his power on Rudy, Curtis and Seth (Matthew McNulty) to make them turn against each other to try to steal the suitcase. Rudy drugs them and locks them in a freezer. Michael is put in the freezer with Finn and Jess and his power makes them want to take the money for themselves. When they are let out of the freezer, Finn steals the money and goes to the roof. Jess, Rudy, Curtis and Seth threaten Finn to try to get the suitcase. Michael arrives and runs to attack Finn. Michael gets the suitcase but falls off the roof, killing himself and ending his power over the group. Finn returns home where he has Sadie (Imogen Doel) tied up to his bed. Rudy moves in with Finn and discovers he is keeping Sadie captive. Rudy's otherself releases her while Finn is out. Finn explains to the group that he kept Sadie captive because she was using her power to make him act how she wanted him to so he would be a better boyfriend. Finn keeping her captive stopped her power over him. Finn and Sadie reunite but when he acts unhygienically she uses her power on him. Jess convinces Seth to remove Sadie's power, ending her power over him. They then end their relationship. Finn visits his dad's ex-girlfriend Lisa (Nadine Lewington). Lisa flirts with him and when Finn rejects her advances she gives him oral sex. When Finn does not want to see her anymore, Lisa phones Finn's father, Mike (Rick Warden) and tells him that she gave Finn oral sex. Finn goes to see Mike who is angry with Finn and tells him that he is not Finn's biological father and that he does not want to see him anymore. A week later, Finn continues the search for his father by interviewing several members of a group photo taken with his mother on the night he was apparently conceived. After a few knock backs and finding out his mother was referred to through her school years as 'Anal Mary', he finally found his father and also discovered he had a half-sister, Grace, as well. However, his father is dying of cancer and is only being kept alive by Grace's storm-obtained restoration power. Wishing to finally die, Finn's father instructs him to convince Grace to let him go so Finn takes her out. There, he finds Alex suspiciously purchasing something from another man. Assuming he is 'paying for sex', Finn tells Jess, who has rekindled her previous interest in him following an apology. Despite this, Finn fails and returns home with Grace. The next morning, the two fight over whether their father should live or die, almost resulting in Grace strangling him to death. However, she sees that she was selfish to keep him alive in such pain and relieves him of his terminal burden. Finn returns to his community service, upset and hurt that the father he had just discovered had died. After it is discovered by Rudy that Finn has only ever slept with on other girl, his ex-girlfriend, Rudy encourages him to have sex with a girl at a house party. Finn achieves this, although despite still having feelings for Jess he goes on to have sex with Abby at the community centre by her invitation.

Finn's attraction towards Jess continues into Series 5, although her feelings are not reciprocated. During Episode 1 he gains the power to convert others to Satanism, but in doing so he is possessed by the Devil to commit cruel acts towards others. After converting every member of the gang but Alex, Alex is forced to use his power on Finn by raping him to remove his Satanic Conversion power. Later on, Finn discovers that Greg, the probation worker, has a crush on him. Feeling uncomfortable he tries to reject Greg's advances, and ends up accidentally using his telekinesis to throw him over a flight of stairs. Believing that he is dead he, Rudy and Jess go to bury him, only to find out that he is still alive, but unconscious. Instead they place him in a car without the brakes on and let it crash, making him believe when he wakes up that he was in a drink driving accident. The scheme works, and Greg apologises to Finn. In episode 5 Rudy helps Finn get over his crush on Jess by introducing him to new girls at the Power Support Group. There he meets Leah, who is using her power to "download" her consciousness and mind into her friend Debby. Leah falls in love with Finn and traps him inside a virtual reality world inside her computer. The rest of the gang go to save him, but Leah downloads herself into Alex who then tries to kill them all. Once they all get back to Leah's apartment and save Finn he tells them not to hurt her. In episode 6 Finn pretends to be a terminally patient so that he gets "sympathy sex" from girls who pity him, but after hanging around with other terminally ill patients for so long he is infected by one of their powers to lose the will to live. Becoming clinically depressed he attempts to hang himself, only to be saved by Alex just in time. At the party marking the one year anniversary of the Storm, Finn finds out about Rudy and Jess' relationship, and becomes infuriated as he refuses to forgive either of them. After Sarah, Alex's new love interest, gains the Satanic Conversion power from the first episode of the series, she converts him. He returns to normal after Sarah dies. In the final episode of series 5 when Jess jumps forward in time one year she finds out that Finn has become a trainee probation worker, teaming up with Greg to discipline young offenders. When the gang realises that the Jumper Posse of Sam, Helen and Karen are using their powers for evil they all set out to stop them, and Finn uses his power to slam a piano into Karen, killing her. This timeline is undone when Jess travels back to the present, and she stops all of this from happening. Finn's story arc ends with him becoming friends with Rudy and Jess again, and accepting that he should become a superhero with the rest of the gang.

== Reception ==
Writing for The Independent, Neela Debanth said Finn is "a wide-eyed, naïve manchild with an odd sense of humour and an ineptitude for telekinesis". Debnath felt that out of series four's new characters of Finn and Jess, Jess "comes across as the more likeable and ‘conventional’ social miscreant compared to Finn. Saying this, there is more to Finn on closer inspection, namely the girl tied to his bed". Debnath felt that Overman "is clearly trying to avoid replicating personalities in order to make sure that Jess and Finn are not seen as replacements but characters in their own right. However, neither of them are [sic] as distinct as their predecessors. It is more difficult to pigeonhole them, which in this case is not a good thing because it makes it difficult to get a sense of them". Debnath felt the humour was at times "just not as pithy as it has been in the past, particularly with Finn". Morgan Jeffrey of Digital Spy said that Finn is "not so much a motor-mouth as someone who suffers perpetually from 'word vomit', coming out with all manner of bizarre and dark ramblings in his efforts to impress". Jeffrey added that the show may have begun to find itself with "the intriguing reveal that Finn - previously a bit of a one-note buffoon - may have quite the dark side". He concluded that "both Crome and McMullen make a strong first impression". Jordan Farley of SFX said the episode "actively encourages us to dislike, or at least be put off by, these characters" such as when "Finn tells some reprehensible fibs". He added that Finn and Jess "have their moments to shine, but we never really get a sense of how they will fit into the new gang or even who they are. [...] Finn we get a better handle on. He’s a little bit like a cowardly, scouse version of Heath Ledger's Joker, constantly telling tall tales about his past, but whatever we learn is coloured by the reveal at the end of the episode". He added that the characters' introductions "fail to make a big impression". Simon Cocks, writing for MSN, said Finn and Jess "fit into the dynamic perfectly". He added that it would "be exciting" to see them in action as the show progresses. Metro journalist Sarah Deen opined that "from the moment loud-mouthed-lout-with-a-dark-side Finn cracks a joke about his mother in extremely bad taste to the pitch-dark closing moments, it’s a riot; with Nathan McMullen proving he can be just as feisty as the existing characters in his role as Finn".

Jeffrey said although Finn appeared to be a "demented kidnapper", it "eventually transpires that, thank goodness, Finn is not a terrifying freak". He went on to say that his efforts to escape Sadie's influence "may have been a little extreme to say the least, but you can't help but sympathise with the poor lad's plight once you learn the truth and his bizarro relationship starts to unravel". Jeffrey commented that Finn begins to "feel a little more real" during the second episode of the fourth series which allows "McMullen's cheeky Scouser [...] more room to breath". Jeffrey added that the "new group dynamic also feels like it's taking shape, with Finn in particular having already found his role as the gang's new punching bag". Debnath said she felt "initial sympathy towards Finn but when he continuously showed how immature he was, the sympathy began to recede and he just came across as pathetic and annoying without being particularly funny". She criticised the episode's attempts to "pull at the audience’s heartstrings" by using Finn's relationship with Sadie as she felt it "just fell flat". Farley opined that "Finn isn’t a creepy Buffalo-Bill-wannabe after all. Not the greatest surprise, admittedly, but a welcome one. He may get off the hook for kidnap and false imprisonment, but the episode still paints a dubious picture of the shifty scouser". He added that Finn's reasoning for keeping Sadie captive "is a tad disappointing".

Catriona Wightman of Digital Spy felt that Finn's storyline with his father's ex-girlfriend Lisa is more "interesting - or at least more strange". She felt the storyline was worth it as it led to "the heartbreaking scene as Finn discovers that his dad is actually not his biological father - making him even more lovable. And the story also pushes forward the cute blossoming romance between Jess and Finn, making their feelings for each other more clear".
