= Jess (Misfits) =

- Misfits character
- First appearance: Series 4 episode 1
- Created by: Howard Overman
- Portrayed by: Karla Crome
- Power: X-ray vision

In-universe information
- Gender: Female
- Family: unknown

Jess is a fictional character from the British Channel 4 science fiction comedy-drama Misfits, portrayed by Karla Crome. Jess was created to replace Antonia Thomas and Iwan Rheon, who played Alisha Daniels and Simon Bellamy, after they departed the show. Jess began appearing from series 4 episode 1, in which she was introduced alongside Finn (Nathan McMullen). Jess has the power of X-ray vision, which is down to her ability to "see through people and their bullshit". Jess is described as "the person who will say the un-sayable, the person who’ll question social norms and etiquette". Neela Debnath of The Independent said that "Jess comes across as the more likeable and ‘conventional’ social miscreant" out of the new introductions of the show. Morgan Jeffrey of Digital Spy felt Crome made "a strong first impression" while Jordan Farley of SFX said Jess has her "moments to shine" but that she "fails to make a big impression". Writing for MSN, Simon Cocks said Jess and Finn "fit into the dynamic perfectly".

== Casting and character creation ==
The character of Jess was announced on 1 March 2012, with Jess created as one of three characters to replace departed cast members Antonia Thomas and Iwan Rheon, who played Alisha Daniels and Simon Bellamy respectively. Actresses being considered for the role were aged between eighteen and twenty-five. On May 22 it was announced that Karla Crome had secured the role of Jess.

== Characterisation ==
A casting call for Jess described her as: "a kind of female version of Larry David – smart and articulate, She’s the person who will say the un-sayable, the person who’ll question social norms and etiquette. Jess hates people who bullshit and lie to her". Jess has the power of X-ray vision. Crome said that Jess "says what she thinks and can see through people's bullshit. Because she's so straightforward, she gets frustrated when people aren't honest with her. She's a tough cookie, but she's quite vulnerable too". The actress explained that her character's power has a "direct correlation" with her character as "she can see through people and their bullshit like she can see through walls". She added that "in a lot of ways she’s a bit sour as a person. She’s got a good heart but she’s not out to make friends. But the friendships she does develop are very loyal. She can’t be bothered with the joking around, boyish stuff, I suppose". Fellow cast member Joseph Gilgun, who plays Rudy Wade, described Jess as "a clever girl, who's not to be messed with at all". Digital Spy's Morgan Jeffrey described Jess as a "feisty character". Jordan Farley of SFX described Jess using the tagline "Tough. Troubled. Tetchy", while Claire Webb of Radio Times described her as "doe-eyed, moody Jess".

== Storylines ==
Jess arrives for her first day of community service where she meets fellow young offender Finn (Nathan McMullen). Rudy Wade (Joseph Gilgun) impersonates their probation worker. Using her X-ray vision, Jess sees that Rudy has Curtis Donovan (Nathan Stewart-Jarrett) locked inside a freezer and the pair help him escape. Rudy believes that Michael (Nathaniel Martello-White) had sent Jess and Finn. Michael had previously arrived at the community centre with a suitcase of money and used his power on Rudy, Curtis and Seth (Matthew McNulty) to make them turn against each other to try to steal the suitcase. Rudy drugs them and locks them in a freezer. Michael is put in the freezer with Jess and Finn and his power makes them want to take the money for themselves. When they are let out of the freezer, Finn steals the money and goes to the roof. Jess threatens Finn with a broken bottle while Rudy, Curtis and Seth also threaten Finn to get the suitcase. Michael arrives and runs to attack Finn. Michael gets the suitcase but falls off the roof, killing himself and ending his power over the group. Jess meets Alex (Matt Stokoe) and flirts with him. Jess convinces Seth to remove the power of Finn's girlfriend, Sadie (Imogen Doel) as she is controlling him. Rudy's third self begins stalking Jess and taunts her about how long it has been since she had sex. Jess has a drink with Alex and when she invites him back to her flat, he makes an excuse as to why he can not come. Jess argues with him—he tells her it is not her fault he does not want to go back to her flat but he has issues of his own that he needs to deal with. Rudy's third self confronts Jess and they have a heartfelt conversation. She reveals that she had an eating disorder and began having sex with her friend and confidant. He later left Jess and began having sex with another vulnerable girl. As a result, Jess tried to kill herself. She tells Rudy's third self that she has since not let herself become intimate with someone. He tells Jess that he is not Rudy but Rudy's third self and that he has the two other Rudy's trapped inside his body. Rudy's third self tells Jess he plans to kill her but she stabs him with a pair of scissors. While he dies, Jess kisses him and in return, he releases the other two Rudys from his body. The next week, as Jess is walking through the estate, she bumps into the mysterious bar man Alex. They agree to a date, but Jess is later put off by Finn who confides in her that he saw Alex exchanging money with another man, possibly 'for sex'. Jess is later made more suspicious upon being invited to his apartment, finding his clothes neatly organised and photos of him close with other men. However, Alex confirms that he isn't gay and will only partake in a relationship if they took it slow. Jess agrees but at a party, she tries to seduce him. After being knocked back, she loses her temper and leaves and breaks down. However, as she cries, she is assaulted by 'The White Rabbit' a manifestation created by Rudy's best friend, Richard Saunders, accidentally through a power. Being knocked unconscious, she is dragged into the elevator and then the basement. Later, the gang go looking for her with Alex even getting the upper hand against the rabbit. However, it is finally killed by Abbey. They go back to the community centre to wash when Alex reveals a transgender man with a power has stolen his penis, replacing it with a vagina. Jess informs him they'll help find it and their relationship should continue. Much later at the bar, Jess admits to Rudy that Alex lacks male genitalia something she threatened him to secrecy. However, upon seeing Finn once again distressed and pining after Jess, Rudy lets him in on the secret and later joins in mocking the bartender. Alex walks in, realises Jess told them and storms off much to Jess' distress. She tried to follow, but is informed he went to a night club where the transgender man who stole his penis has been sighted. She goes there, finding him with a gun to the head of the man. He then threatens suicide, an action that forces the transgender man to give him back his penis. However, rejoicing over their ability to now physically replicate their lust is cut short as it turns out Alex is a narcissistic lover as well as a cheat.

== Reception ==
Neela Debnath of The Independent said that Jess is "a smart, sarcastic wise-cracker who can see through walls". She felt that of series four new characters, "Jess comes across as the more likeable and ‘conventional’ social miscreant". Debnath felt that Overman "is clearly trying to avoid replicating personalities in order to make sure that Jess and Finn are not seen as replacements but characters in their own right. However, neither of them are as distinct as their predecessors. It is more difficult to pigeonhole them, which in this case is not a good thing because it makes it difficult to get a sense of them". However, Debnath was more complimentary towards the humour of the character, saying that while at times the humour in the show had not been "as pithy as it has been in the past [...] Jess throws out some zingers to offset this". Morgan Jeffrey of Digital Spy said that Jess is "straight-shooting" and keeps "a level head". He added that "Crome and McMullen make a strong first impression". Jordan Farley of SFX said Jess and Finn "have their moments to shine, but we never really get a sense of how they will fit into the new gang or even who they are. Jess more so than Finn. Aside from being a bit prickly she remains a mystery by the end of the episode". He added that the character's introductions "fail to make a big impression". Writing for MSN, Simon Cocks said Jess and Finn "fit into the dynamic perfectly". He added that it would "be exciting" to see them in action as the show progresses. Metro journalist Sarah Deen opined that Jess "might be the weakest link, with her style of acting - probably intended as deadpan - coming across instead as just irritating".

Jeffrey felt that Jess begins to "feel a little more real" during her second appearance as "Crome's sarcastic straight-shooter" has "more room to breath". He added that the audience "also get to see the first crack in Jess's icy demeanour when she tries to hit on hot barman Alex and her attempt falls spectacularly flat". Farley commented that although Jess "gets some revealing character moments" they are "very heavy-handed (her reaction upon seeing Alex for the first time is particularly clumsy)". He added that Jess is "proving quite a difficult character to get on with".

Reviewing the third episode of the fourth series, Digital Spy's Catriona Wightman said that "Psycho-Rudy latches onto Jess" leading to them sharing secrets from their pasts in a "wonderfully silly" scene, due to them being interrupted by a wedding DJ setting up next door "who can't help but blare out 'Macarena' at the worst possible moments". She felt that the absurdity is offset by the "really quite devastating revelations coming from Jess". Wightman explained that the situation turns "brilliantly creepy" as Jess can not escape her captor. Wightman felt that the scene is "brilliantly tense" as Rudy reveals that he plans to murder Jess before she manages to kill him with a pair of scissors. Wightman concluded that Crome and Gilgun "were brilliant in this episode, with Crome being both vulnerable and spiky".
