= Rudy Wade =

- Misfits character
- First appearance: "Vegas Baby!"
- Created by: Howard Overman
- Portrayed by: Joe Gilgun
- Power: Emotionally induced multiplication

In-universe information
- Gender: Male
- Occupation: Unemployed
- Father: Geoff Wade
- Mother: Pat Wade

Rudy Wade is a fictional character from the British Channel 4 science fiction comedy-drama Misfits, portrayed by Joe Gilgun. After Robert Sheehan, who played Nathan Young, announced his departure, it was announced a new character called Rudy would join the show as a replacement. Casting for Rudy was announced soon after, with Gilgun cast in the role. Rudy was created as the "new funny man" of the show, a role previously held by Nathan. Rudy first appears in an online special titled "Vegas Baby!" Rudy has the ability to split into multiple personalities. While two of these personalities are originally introduced, it is later revealed that there is a third Rudy who was imprisoned prior to Rudy's introduction in the series.

== Casting and creation ==
On 10 April 2011 it was confirmed that Robert Sheehan who portrays Nathan Young would not be returning to the show. To replace Nathan, it was announced a new character called Rudy would be joining the show, with casting still ongoing. It was announced that Rudy's arrival would air in an online special. On May 9, 2011 it was announced Joe Gilgun had been cast as Rudy. Gilgun said he finds Rudy "great" to play. Misfits creator Howard Overman said he created Rudy as a "new funny man" to replace Sheehan, whose character Nathan previously held the role. On Rudy as a source of humour Overman added it isn't as "crazy" as Nathan's humour. Overman said he wanted to make Rudy different from Nathan and did this by making Rudy "more emotional". Producer Petra Fried said Rudy was "another classic Overman creation". In March 2012 Gilgun confirmed he would return for Misfit's fourth series.

== Characterisation ==
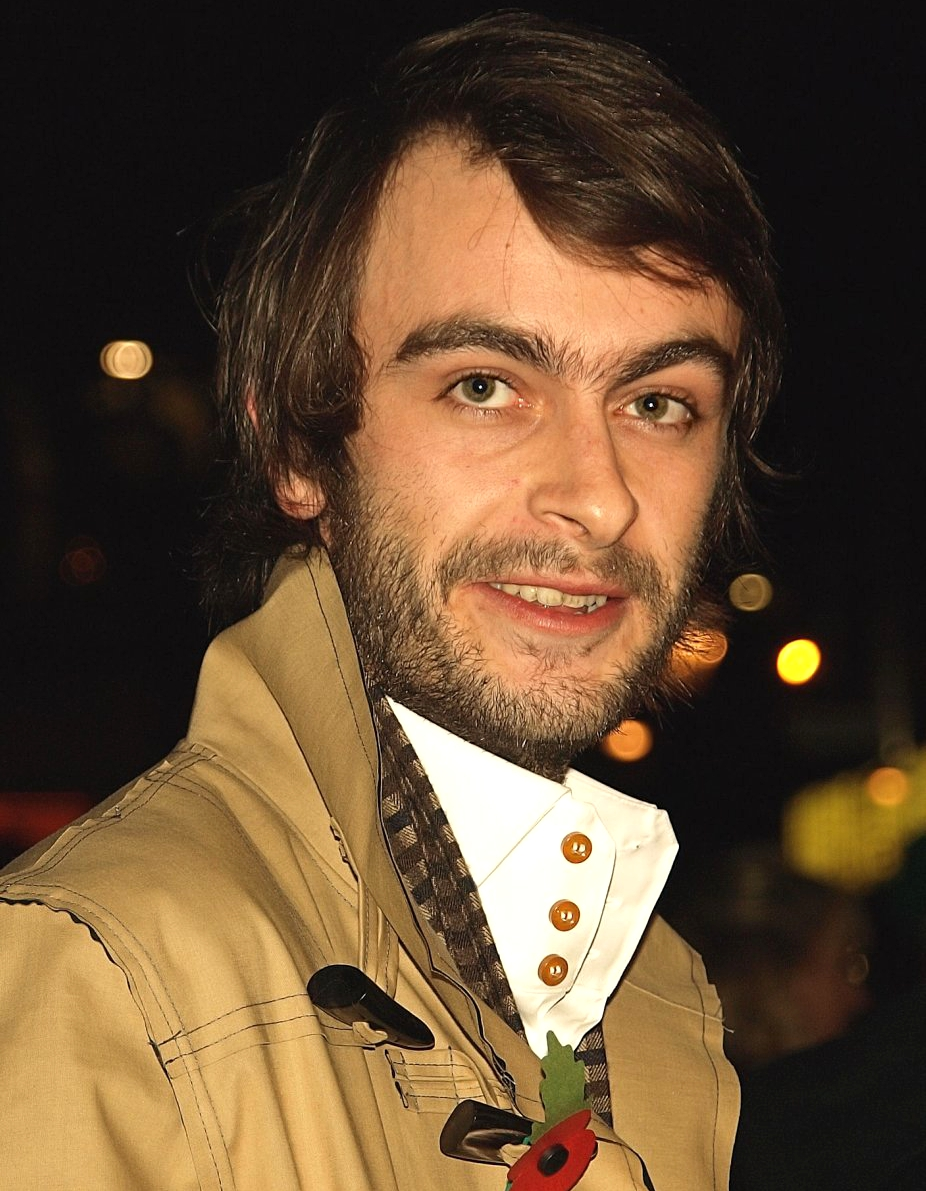
Joseph Gilgun (pictured) has said that Rudy is a "happy go lucky guy" who is "a bit of a sociopath".

Gilgun commented on Rudy saying he was a "happy go lucky guy" and said he was a "rough diamond". Gilgun added that Rudy was "happy all the time" although he felt like Rudy was "a bit of a sociopath" because he "doesn't question things he says or does" and doesn't care what people think about him. Gilgun added that Rudy is "not a bad person" and is "quite endearing". He added that Rudy "doesn't question anything", has "no set motive" and "lives for the moment". Gilgun also added that Rudy is "consistently wrong". Gilgun added that Rudy is "a total plonker who gets into multiple scrapes wherever he goes - and with whoever he meets".

MSN News described Rudy as "foul mouthed" adding he "seems to be a man with no interior monologue - he just says it all out loud". On the two sides of Rudy's personality they stated: "Rudy's split personality manifests itself in the power to split into two versions of himself - one endlessly confident and cheery, the other depressed and consumed with self-pity, melancholy and, watch out Simon, unrequited love for Alisha".

== Storylines ==
Rudy lost his virginity to Alisha Daniels (Antonia Thomas) while at a party. The next day at college, she ignored him and he later attempted suicide. Some time later Rudy was caught in the storm which gave him the power to split into three Rudys with three personalities. Rudy was given community service when he had a heated argument with his ex-girlfriend and while upset, vandalised her car.

Rudy flirts with Charlie (Nathalie Emmanuel) at a pub after doing his community service. Other Rudy, who is waiting outside after splitting out of Rudy, speaks to Tanya (Katie Moore) who admits her initial judgement of Rudy was wrong and he is more sensitive to others than she thought. After Tanya goes back inside the pub, she witnesses Rudy kissing Charlie. Tanya, who has the power to freeze those around her, freezes those in the pub and hits Rudy with a glass bottle before blaming Curtis Donovan (Nathan Stewart-Jarrett). The next day, she freezes Rudy and pushes him down some stairs. This is witnessed by Kelly Bailey (Lauren Socha), Simon Bellamy (Iwan Rheon) and Curtis. They tell Rudy that Tanya is to blame, who freezes the group and blames them for breaking a police car window. Rudy realises the group also have powers and admits he does too. Rudy goes to Simon's flat with the group where he sees Alisha before leaving hurriedly. Rudy sets up Tanya for stealing the charity box from the community centre but after she is arrested, she escapes the police car. Rudy and Alisha meet at the pub and when Rudy splits into two other Rudy tells Alisha of Rudy's suicide attempt. Rudy and other Rudy decide to remain split off from each other. When Rudy and Charlie are together in the community centre, Tanya freezes them, stabbing Charlie and placing the blade in Rudy's hand. Rudy cradles Charlie as she dies and when Alisha comes to the community centre to speak to Rudy, Tanya freezes them putting them both in nooses while balancing on chairs, so if they fall they will hang to death. Rudy kicks Tanya who falls over Charlie's body and cracks her head open on the floor, killing her. The chair Rudy was balanced on falls and he begins to hang. Alisha tries to save him, telling him to wrap his legs around her. Alisha apologises to Rudy for her actions, admitting that she remembered Rudy and at the time did not care who she hurt. Rudy accepts her apology and lets go. Other Rudy returns before saving Rudy's life and the pair decide to no longer remain split. Rudy and the group bury the bodies before Rudy drives the group home in a stolen car, leading to them getting community service.

Rudy gives Curtis in his female form, who goes by the name of Melissa (Kehinde Fadipe), oral sex although he is unaware she has been given the date rape drug. When Curtis returns to his male form, he is angry with Rudy. An alternate timeline is created when a man travels to the past to try to kill Hitler, although he accidentally gives the Nazis an advantage and they win the war. In the present day, Rudy along with Curtis and Kelly are trying to prevent the Nazis using Seth (Matthew McNulty) to steal their powers to gain more force. They help Seth escape from the Nazis and Seth gives the power of time travel to Kelly who travels back in time and stops the Nazis winning the war. Rudy meets Leah (Amy Manson) in a bar and after flirting with her, she agrees to sleep with him. She tells him she doesn't want it to be a one-night stand and wants him there when she wakes up. He leaves before she wakes angering her. Simon, who has the power of seeing the future, sees Rudy's penis fall off. Rudy realises he has contracted a form of STD caused by someone with a power which is causing his penis to erode. He tracks down Leah with the help of Simon and publicly apologises to any girl that he has used for sex in the past. Leah recognises that he feels regret and fixes his penis.

Michael (Nathaniel Martello-White) arrives at the community service and Rudy, Curtis and Seth are infected with his power of an infectious greed which makes those around him desperate to get his briefcase full of money. The briefcase is handcuffed to Michael, so Rudy saws Michael's hand off to get the case. The case is later stolen. Rudy and Seth lock Curtis in the freezer to try to get him out of the way. Jess (Karla Crome) and Finn (Nathan McMullen) join community service. They rescue Curtis from the freezer, only to be locked in the freezer themselves by Rudy. Michael is locked in with them and infects them. Finn and Jess are released by Rudy's other self who tells them where the briefcase is. Finn steals it for himself. On the community centre roof, Finn is confronted by the group only for Michael to fall to his death, breaking his power over the group. Rudy's third self, who had been imprisoned after badly beating somebody up, is released from prison. He begins to stalk Jess and he pulls the two other Rudys in to his body. He plans to murder Jess but she stabs him with a pair of scissors. While dying, he asks Jess to kiss him and get over her intimacy issues and in return, he will release the two other Rudys from his body. He releases the other two Rudys and then dies. Rudy later finds out that his friend Curtis, who subsequently is also the final member of the original ASBO Five, has become a zombie and therefore decides that he must kill him. But after many failed attempts, he finally calls Curtis to ask what they are going to do. However, it seemed Curtis had already made up his mind and despite Rudy's pleas to hold it off for a few days, he kills himself. Rudy is then given counseling for Curtis' apparent suicide. At a party a few days later, Rudy meets Nadine, a girl who keeps running off after twelve. After finding out he is deeply in love with her, Rudy follows her and finds out she is in fact a Nun. He then visits the monastery to admit himself, only to be turned away by her fellow sisters. However, Nadine continues to see Rudy much against their wishes, so they kidnap her and keep her in containment. Rudy gathers Jess and Finn to help break her out, as they use their powers to gain access to their room. After saving her, however, it becomes apparent why the Nuns left her imprisoned as her power is unleashed after she witnessed several sinful and disturbing acts committed by the new Misfits including violence and casual sex. Her power releases the Four Horsemen of the Apocalypse as they attempt to slay everyone present, effectively injuring Alex, Jess's lover. Nadine sacrifices herself after Rudy and Finn confirm they'd willingly die to protect her and the Four Horsemen disappear. Rudy holds a funeral for her and buries her alongside the other bodies in the woods.

== Reception ==
After Rudy's first scene in Vegas Baby! entertainment site Digital Spy said they were "really quite excited about seeing what Joe brings to the show". MSN News felt Rudy was a "perfect replacement for gobby, irritating Nathan in the group dynamic". Neela Debnath of The Independent commented saying Rudy is "every bit as immature and funny as Nathan". She felt that Rudy "fulfills the role of the childish, sex-obsessed member of the group and has an endless stream of filth which he shares with the others much to their chagrin and disgust". Debnath added that Rudy is not just a "cheeky chap" replacing another but with his power he can be the "super-cocky bad boy" Rudy and the "timid, insecure Rudy who tried to kill himself after Alisha rejected him when they were at college". Debnath felt that "there is more to him than meets the eye and this promises to make him an interesting character". Rudy being an acquaintance of Alisha meant that Rudy was "neatly brought into the fold. He fits in well with the others and is not a complete outsider, making him less of a replacement and more an addition to the ‘Misfits’ family". The Guardian commented that Rudy has "provided some brilliant Misfits moments". They added that Rudy's superpower "is the ability to split into two sides of himself – and instead of staying with the traditional atte "trying to make sure that both of them aren't seen at the same time by the public" narrative, both sides of Rudy are played as completely different characters. On the one hand, we have a boisterous and 'have it' player; on the other hand a shy and caring man moping around the community centre. The result has been some inspired banter between Rudy's selves, including one time when he was forced into counselling".

After the departures of three cast members, Debnath said Rudy was still there to "keep things interesting". She said that "comedy scenes involving Rudy are on form, possibly because Overman knows this character a lot better than his new creations" but she felt that a scene in which Rudy cut off a man's hand was "gratuitously violent" and "unnecessary". Simon Cocks, writing for MSN, said Rudy was the highlight of series four episode one as Gilgun is "on terrific form as Rudy, with numerous memorable lines in this episode. His delight at his own acting ability is particularly great". Cocks went on to add that Rudy is "incredibly funny" and that "All of his moments in this premiere were superb. He was a real success last year, although some fans persisted in comparing him unfavourably to the recently departed Nathan. Absolutely unfair, but inevitable". Debnath felt that a storyline involving Rudy flirting with Alley was "the more amusing thread in this episode". She explained that Rudy was "brilliant" throughout the episode and that Gilgun "is excellent at playing the two Rudys, he is the strongest member of the cast and is carrying the show at the moment". SFX journalist Jordan Farley felt that during the second episode of series four Rudy is not "on the best form (though he has his moments, of course)" but that he is "on hand for a bit of split personality fun". Claire Crick of Radio Times said it is still Gilgun as Rudy "who gets the lewdest, crudest gags and all the best lines". Crick felt that when Gilgun is "on screen it’s difficult to take your eyes off him – so mesmerising is he as split-personality superhero Rudy. Tonight there’s three of him cussing and wise-cracking: his evil alter ego has come back to terrorise the other two (only slightly evil) Rudys. Even by the show’s demented standards it’s beyond belief and yet Gilgun manages to make it completely convincing". The Metro's Keith Watson felt that Gilgun "acts up a storm as, not content with splitting his personality in two, he now has a third alter ego to contend with – and the latest one is the most demented of the wackjob bunch. It’s a masterclass of comic acting that deserves a Bafta".
