= Curtis Donovan =

- Misfits character
- First appearance: Series 1 Episode 1
- Last appearance: Series 4 Episode 4
- Created by: Howard Overman
- Portrayed by: Nathan Stewart-Jarrett; Kehinde Fadipe (female)
- Power: Time manipulation (series 1–2); Gender swapping (series 3); Resurrection (series 3-4)

In-universe information
- Nickname: Melissa (when female)
- Species: Human
- Gender: Male; Female (when using second power)
- Occupation: Bartender
- Nationality: British

Curtis Donovan is a fictional character from the British Channel 4 science fiction comedy-drama Misfits, portrayed by Nathan Stewart-Jarrett. Curtis appears from the series inception and was the only original character to appear in all of the first four series. Curtis is sentenced to community service after being caught in possession of cocaine and later gains the power of time manipulation when involved in a freak storm. He has also been involved in relationships with Alisha Daniels (Antonia Thomas) and later with Nikki (Ruth Negga). Curtis later gains the power to swap biological sex, followed by the ability to resurrect people from the dead. While in female form, Curtis is portrayed by Kehinde Fadipe. Stewart-Jarrett left the show in the fourth episode of the fourth series when the character was killed off.

== Casting and character creation ==
Casting for the part was announced on 17 August 2009 by Digital Spy. Stewart-Jarett went through an audition process for the part in which he commented on saying "I always thought your audition for drama school was meant to be the hardest you would ever do, but Misfits trumped that. I had to get through four auditions and five meetings before I got the part. The fourth audition was the worst. They placed around 20 of us in a house in Fitzrovia and we all had to work in groups so they could see the dynamics between us. We started in the morning and as the day wore on people were plucked out one by one and sent home. It was quite brutal". Fellow cast member Iwan Rheon revealed that Overman who created the character discussed how to write their parts with the cast and later began writing for them as actors. Stewart-Jarett added that Overman "gave us a licence to do that and it was actually quite nice in a way".

== Development ==
=== Characterisation ===
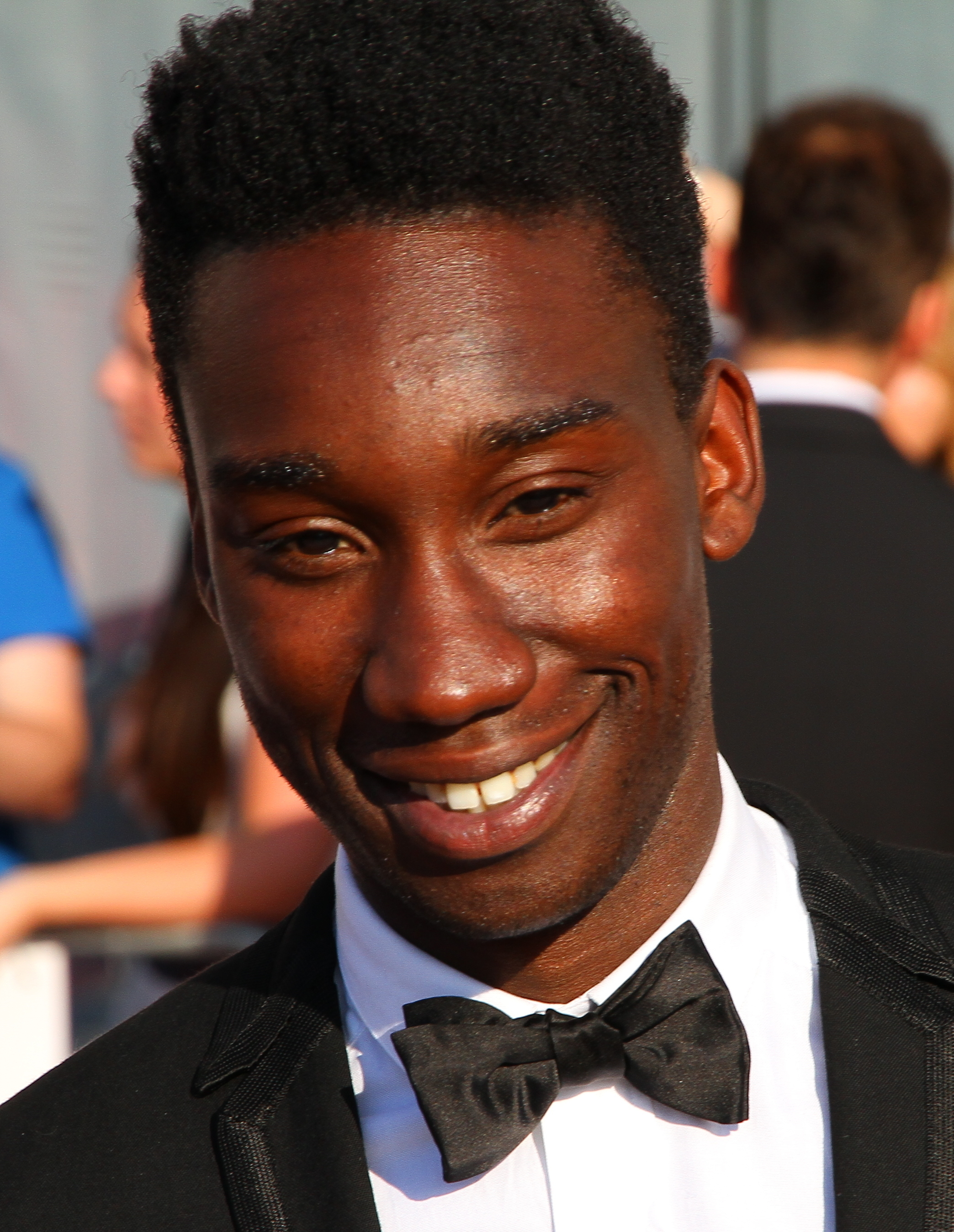
Nathan Stewart-Jarrett (pictured) described Curtis as a "Serious guy" who has a "real sense of frustration" about him.

E4's official website depicts him as "a rising sports star whose goal was to compete in the 2012 Olympics. But his career is left in tatters after he’s caught with an illegal substance and is publicly shamed as he’s made an example under the eyes of the law". Stewart-Jarrett described the character as "a serious guy. He's disappointed in himself and the demise of his athletic aspirations. There's a real sense of frustration about the character it's like he's a fallen angel". The Times described him as a "shamed athlete who can stop and rewind time" a description which is similarly used by The Daily Telegraph who describes him as a "shamed sports star".

== Storylines ==
When buying drugs at a club, Curtis is caught along with his girlfriend Sam (Anna Koval). Curtis is given community service and a two-year ban from athletics, while Sam takes the fall and is sent to prison. Curtis is caught in a storm which grants him the power of time travel, a gift that, like all the other misfits, stems from his main personality trait: Wanting to go back and never have the drug bust happen. In episode 2 of series 1 Curtis flirts with Alisha Daniels (Antonia Thomas). Alisha uses her power of forcing those she touches to go into a sexual frenzy on Curtis and they have sex. Curtis becomes angry with Alisha. Alisha proceeds to go to the park with Ben (Jamie Davis). Because of Alisha's power's influence over Ben, he attempts to rape Alisha. Curtis arrives and attempts to stop Ben, but after touching Alisha joins in attempting to rape Alisha. Alisha escapes and after a heart to heart with Curtis, the pair agree on a non-physical relationship. Sam is released from prison and when she comes to meet Curtis, he feels guilty which causes him to rewind time. Curtis attempts to change the events leading up to her arrest and after a few attempts he successfully achieves this. In order to be able to save the group from Tony (Danny Sapani/Louis Decosta Johnson), however, he must get community service by getting caught with the drugs while Sam is not, sacrificing his athletics career. He realises that because Sam didn't go to prison he is now in a relationship with both Sam and Alisha. Curtis ends his relationship with Sam.

Lucy (Evelyn Hoskins) begins causing trouble for the group by shape shifting into others and causing confusion. After Simon Bellamy (Iwan Rheon) believes he received oral sex from Alisha he attacks him. Lucy, masquerading as Kelly Bailey (Lauren Socha), attacks Curtis nearly suffocating him. Curtis is saved by Superhoodie. Curtis's power allows him to travel to the future momentarily after taking drugs where he witnesses himself being seduced by Nikki (Ruth Negga). Alisha and Curtis argue. Curtis later visits Nikki who he realises is ill. Alisha and Curtis end their relationship. Curtis later asks Nikki out on a date. Curtis and Nikki kiss after being held hostage and later begin a relationship. Curtis plays out the events he witnessed when he travelled to the future. Brian (Jordan Metcalfe) goes public about his power. The group are also forced to go public. Brian becomes angry after others receive more attention than him and begins killing people, including Kelly, Nikki and Alisha. When Brian is about to stab Curtis, Simon intervenes and tells Curtis he must rewind the events in order to save the rest of the group, which he does. Afterward, the group sell their powers to Seth. Nikki is killed and the group decide that they must retrieve their powers. The group steal money collected by Elliot (Edward Hogg) who is falsely claiming to be Jesus Christ reborn, who they kill accidentally. When the group visit Seth (Matthew McNulty) to buy back their powers. Curtis learns his has been sold to an old Jewish man hoping to kill Hitler, leaving Curtis unable to help Nikki, so the group decide to buy new powers.

Curtis gains the power to change to the opposite sex. Curtis is frozen by Tanya (Katie Moore) who hits Rudy Wade (Joseph Gilgun) with a bottle, blaming Curtis. Curtis begins competing in athletics using his female form, Melissa (Kehinde Fadipe). Curtis sleeps with Emma (Hannah Britland) who later tells Melissa of Curtis's negative outlook on life. Emma develops an interest in Melissa and the pair begin a relationship. Melissa has her drink spiked by Mark (Jay Taylor) and receives oral sex from Rudy which is witnessed by Emma. Emma ends her relationship with Melissa. Curtis rescues Emma from Mark and they decide to humiliate Mark as revenge. Curtis tells Emma of his power before Emma leaves. A Jewish man uses Curtis's old power to travel back in time, but accidentally gives the Nazis an advantage. The Nazis win the war. In the alternate timeline, Curtis along with Kelly and Rudy begin planning to rescue Seth from the Nazis who plan to use him to gain others powers. Seth is forced to give the power of time travel to Curtis who is shot and killed by Captain Smith (Glenn Speers). The remaining group manage to rescue Seth who reveals he had not given Curtis the power of time travel. Seth gives the power to Kelly who changes the timeline. Curtis starts using his sex swapping for his own benefit, through masturbating, and becomes stuck in his female form discovering that not only is he pregnant but he will be both the father and mother of the child. In order to become male again Curtis ask Seth to remove his power. Seth agrees if Curtis will take the power of resurrection and return Seth's dead girlfriend Shannon (Charlene McKenna) to life. Curtis brings Shannon back to life and an old lady's cat. They realise that those brought back are zombies. The group kill the old lady after her cat attacks her. The cat attacks a cheerleader who in turn attacks the rest of her cheerleading squad. The group kill the cheerleaders and Seth later kills Shannon. Curtis has sex with Rachel (Jessica Brown Findlay). Rachel kills Alisha, which upsets Simon who goes back in time to save her.

Michael (Nathaniel Martello-White) arrives at the community service and Curtis, Seth and Rudy are infected with his power of an infectious greed which makes those around him desperate to get his briefcase full of money. Curtis is locked in a freezer by Seth and Rudy who try to get him out of the way. Jess (Karla Crome) and Finn (Nathan McMullen) join community service. They rescue Curtis from the freezer, only to be locked in the freezer themselves by Rudy. Michael is locked in with them and infects them. Finn and Jess are released by Rudy's other self who tells them where the briefcase is. Finn steals it for himself. On the community centre roof Finn is confronted by the group only for Michael to fall to his death, breaking his power over the group. Curtis meets trainee probation worker Lola (Lucy Gaskell) and later has sex with her. After beginning a relationship, Lola harms herself and claims to Curtis that her ex-boyfriend, Jake, is responsible. Angered, Curtis tells her he will go over to his apartment and make sure it doesn't happen again. However, Lola warns him that Jake is unhinged and he'd need to take protection. She offered him a gun, an offer he initially refused. Still, he takes it and bursts into the apartment, accidentally killing Jake after a short brawl. Feeling guilty and shamed, Curtis begins to suspect Lola is not all that she seems and decided to use his resurrection power to bring back Jake and find out the truth. However, he is bitten in the process turning into a zombie himself. After witnessing Finn finish off Jake and hiding his secret from the rest, Curtis begins to feed on small animals. However, despite his best efforts, Rudy finds out and regrettably reveals to the others they were going to have to kill him. Meanwhile, Curtis finds out that the apparent trainee probation worker was an aspiring actress, struck by the storm, who turned into her femme fatale character, Lola. Before he can do anything to help her, however, events transpire to make her current boyfriend believe Curtis has begun to stalk and harm her. Being suddenly knocked unconscious on his way home, Curtis reawakens in a disused factory ruin. It is here that he meets Lola after she kills her current boyfriend and Curtis, making it seem like the two fought over her. But Curtis, unaffected by the bullet, springs up, biting and killing Lola with her own gun. Then, after a brief saddened call from Rudy begging him to reconsider his next move, Curtis shoots himself in the head, ending the curse but also his life. Curtis' death is then mentioned briefly in the next episode as a suicide.

== Reception ==
Stewart-Jarrett was nominated for Outstanding Actor in the fiction category at the Monte-Carlo Television Festival in 2011. Den Of Geek described Nathan as "an all-round good egg, is Curtis, and his relationship with Alisha is lovely, if a little bizarre". Tim Dowling of The Guardian described him as the "angry one" of the group of "foul-mouthed young criminals". Neela Debnath of The Independent said she felt Curtis "drew the short straw" because of his power. Debnath reviewed the second episode of series 3 saying that the episode brought Curtis to the "forefront". She added that Curtis's power is "far from the A-list of superpowers" but it gives Curtis "a fresh perspective on life". Debnath felt that even though Curtis did not choose his power "it became very personal and helped to develop his character". She felt that for a long time Curtis had remained as the "moody ex-athlete who was consumed with regret and a yearning for his old life" but by the end of the episode "he had gained a sense of closure and was ready to move on". Commenting on Stewart-Jarrett's performance Debnath said he had "always given a good performance" but because Curtis has always been "stuck in a rut of remorse means that he has been very limited" but hoped the character's change would allow the viewers to see a different side to his acting skills. Debnath also commented on Fadipe's performance saying it was "equally as strong" as Stewart-Jarrett's. She felt that although two actors portrayed the role, "it was Curtis who was always present". Debnath felt Curtis's vulnerability as Melissa was "refreshing" and when he was nearly raped it made the episode "incredibly sinister". Debnath added that when Stewart-Jarett is given a "weightier role" in series 3's fourth episode he "more than fulfilled" it. The Guardian commented on Curtis impregnating himself saying it was one of "Misfits' masterful twists".

Jordan Farley of SFX felt that "Curtis doesn’t really contribute much (again)" and that his plot in which he is subject to racial prejudice by a blind girl "seems engineered to push controversy buttons, but ends on a frustrating note given that Ally’s inexplicable racism is never resolved". Digital Spy journalist Catriona Wightman felt that Curtis "should really be in the middle of the action; instead, his major contribution to the instalment is that he has a bit of a flirt with 'trainee probation worker' Lola [...] Unsurprisingly, this ends up with the duo doing the dirty at the end of the episode".
