= Seth (Misfits) =

- Misfits character
- First appearance: Series 2 Episode 7
- Last appearance: Series 4 Episode 2
- Created by: Howard Overman
- Portrayed by: Matthew McNulty
- Power: Ability to transfer powers to others

In-universe information
- Species: Human
- Gender: Male
- Occupation: Power dealer
- Nationality: British

Seth is a fictional character from the British Channel 4 science fiction comedy-drama Misfits, portrayed by Matthew McNulty. Seth first appears in the Christmas special as a guest character. McNulty knew it was a possibility he may be brought back but did not know for definite until a month before he began filming series three. McNulty explained that Seth is a "plot tool" and is a used by the writers to help continue changing the show through his ability to deal powers, moving them to and from others which was born out of Seth's job as a drug dealer. The character "has to be a bit ruthless at times" but is a "nice guy" who "wants to do the right thing". McNulty explained Seth is "a level-headed, straight thinking guy" and helps the group when things "get a little too far out of hand", driving the situation towards the right resolution "because he’s pretty much a strait-laced character".

== Casting and character creation ==
Matthew McNulty was first cast as Seth to appear in the Christmas special. McNulty reprised his role as Seth throughout the third series which he said was always an option but was never a definite. He was only informed that he would be returning a month before filming began. McNulty explained that Seth is a "plot tool" and is a "useful tool" for the writers to help continue changing the show due to his ability to change the powers of other characters. Digital Spy's Morgan Jeffrey confirmed Seth would appear in the fourth series.

== Characterisation and development ==
McNulty said the audience are initially lead to "sort of think" that Seth is "not a very nice guy" but as the series progresses "you get to know Seth a little bit more [...] and you can kind of get a little bit of an understanding of why he is like he is and I think people will warm to him a little bit more". He explained that Seth was in a long term relationship until his girlfriend died which makes him "a bit needy". McNulty described Seth as being "a bit lonely" after the death of his girlfriend. Because the character is a drug dealer he "has to be a bit ruthless at times" which prevents him from becoming friends with anyone. McNulty explained that he initially thought Seth would be a "dark character" but that Seth is a "nice guy" who "wants to do the right thing". The actor added that Seth is "almost accepted into the group" by the other characters but that he would not "ever be part of the group because he’s not a “Misfit”" and he "doesn’t really fit in to be honest". Seth is an outsider in the group and due to him being "a level-headed, straight thinking guy" he will help rectify things when they "get a little too far out of hand". McNulty went on to say that Seth "drives it forward towards the right resolution because he’s pretty much a strait-laced character".

Seth has the power to move powers to and from others. This was born out of Seth working as a drug dealer, McNulty explained that the power "worked in his favour" but Seth begins to "think about what is he really doing with it". Seth finds it "frustrating" because he has no ability of his own and "all he can do is make money". He is unable to use the powers but will "know every power that’s out there, he’ll see all the cool stuff and stuff that he would probably like to use but can’t, so it’s definitely frustrating for Seth that he simply can’t. He’s got access to all these powers but can’t do anything with it". Seth is not on community service like the other main characters so is not in a boiler suit. McNulty felt that the character was not "worthy" of a boiler suit because he is not "out there enough". McNulty said that his costume often contains "pointy suede black shoes and a black leather jacket". He explained that in his initial appearance as the character he had silver rings on and had a silver tooth which "didn’t seem real. It was just a bit unrealistic, so we got rid of all that, got rid of all the jewels and stuff".

Seth begins a relationship with Kelly Bailey (Lauren Socha). McNulty said he "wouldn't have put Seth and Kelly together, but it works". He added that the characters "bring out the best in each other" as Seth is "so controlled, he plans out everything he does, and Kelly's the complete opposite. That's what Seth needs, so that's why they work well together".

== Storylines ==
Seth is introduced as a former drug dealer who possesses the ability to remove powers from others, store them in his body and then transfer them to another person. Seth uses his power as a business, purchasing powers off people who don't want them, then selling them to willing buyers. Alisha Daniels (Antonia Thomas) first visits Seth asking him to remove her power, which he does for free. Nathan Young (Robert Sheehan) sells his power of immortality followed by Curtis Donovan (Nathan Stewart-Jarrett), Kelly and Nikki (Ruth Negga) and later Simon Bellamy (Iwan Rheon) who each sell their powers. The group try to buy their powers back, but Seth doubles the price. They later return with stolen money and buy new powers from Seth.

Seth grows closer to Kelly and they share a kiss in an alternate timeline. Seth tells Kelly he used to be a drug dealer and he gave his ex-girlfriend the drugs which killed her. Seth rescues Kelly from Jen a comatose patient who body swaps with her. Seth and Kelly begin a relationship. Seth finds the ability of resurrection and asks Curtis to use it for him to resurrect his dead girlfriend. Curtis resurrects Shannon (Charlene McKenna) who has a desire to consume blood as a side effect of her resurrection. Shannon eats Seth's pet iguana and infects Seth's neighbour. Kelly warns Seth of Shannon's state but he ignores her and ends their relationship. He realises that she is a zombie and goes to kill her but can not. Seth helps the group kill a squad of cheerleaders who have become infected. Shannon turns up at the community centre and threatens to infect Kelly so Seth will no longer want her. Seth tells Shannon he loves Kelly and kills her. Seth and Kelly reunite. Seth helps Simon obtain the power of time travel and gives him money so that when he travels back in time he can purchase a power from Seth.

Seth and Kelly go travelling and while in Uganda Kelly defuses a landmine, saving a boy's life and being praised by the villagers. She and Seth decide to stay in Uganda to help defuse landmines. Seth returns to England to collect their belongings. Michael (Nathaniel Martello-White) arrives at the community service and Seth, Curtis and Rudy are infected with his power of an infectious greed which makes those around him desperate to get his briefcase full of money. Seth and Rudy lock Curtis in the freezer to try to get him out of the way. The briefcase is handcuffed to Michael and his hand is cut off by Rudy, only for the briefcase only to go missing. Seth begins torturing Michael so he will reveal where the briefcase is. Jess (Karla Crome) and Finn (Nathan McMullen) join community service. They rescue Curtis from the freezer, only to be locked in the freezer themselves by Rudy. Michael is locked in with them and infects them. Finn and Jess are released by Rudy's otherself who tells them where the briefcase is. Finn steals it for himself. On the community centre roof Finn is confronted by the group only for Michael to fall to his death, breaking his power over the group. Seth is convinced to take Sadie's (Imogen Doel) so she does not use it on Finn. Seth later returns to Uganda to be with Kelly.

== Reception ==
Neela Debnath of The Independent said she found Seth's storyline as the "power guy" to be "intriguing". Debnath later expressed that she felt Seth's relationship with Kelly was "satisfying" adding that the pair "have an underplayed chemistry which works because both of them are guarded characters, neither of whom wants to lose face". The Guardian said they were yet to decide if "Seth is actually well and truly good or not, especially given that he plays a banker of superpowers at a time when our faith in bankers in the real world is somewhat lacking". Catriona Wightman of Digital Spy said she was "quite enjoying the Kelly-Seth frisson". Wightman said that she felt Seth and Kelly making up after an argument "so sweet" that it convinced her the writers were planning to kill Seth off.

Morgan Jeffrey of Digital Spy said the only negative point of series 4 episode 2 "is the quiet, underwritten departure of Seth. Last week, the retired power dealer felt like a spare part - without Kelly, he doesn't have much of a purpose and it felt like he was being kept around more for familiarity's sake than anything else. This week, Seth at least briefly services the plot, but it's still a rather underwhelming exit for Matthew McNulty's loveable rogue, who contributed so much to Misfits last year". Jordan Farley of SFXfelt Seth "is reduced to a plot device in, presumably, his last appearance of the series".
