= Harvest (disambiguation) =

Harvest is the process of gathering mature crops from the fields.

Harvest may also refer to:

== Agriculture ==
- Harvest (wine), the harvesting of wine grapes
- Harvest festival, an annual celebration occurring around the time of the harvest

== Cities ==
- Harvest, Alabama

== Entertainment and media ==
=== Film ===
- Harvest (1936 film), an Austrian film
- Harvest (1937 film), a French film
- Harvest (1967 film), a 1967 documentary film
- The Harvest (1993 film), a thriller directed by David Marconi
  - The Harvest (soundtrack), the 1993 film's soundtrack
- The Harvest (2010 film), a feature documentary film about children migrant workers
- The Harvest (2013 film), a horror-thriller film by John McNaughton
- Harvest (2024 film), a drama film by Athina Rachel Tsangari
- Harvest (2026 film), drama–thriller film by Paul Kampf

=== Literature ===
- Harvest (Crace novel), a novel by Jim Crace nominated for the 2013 Man Booker Prize
- Harvest: Contemporary Mormon Poems (1989)
- Harvest, a 1996 medical thriller novel by Tess Gerritsen
- Harvest, a 1995 novel by New Zealand author Ian Middleton
- Harvest, a 1990 novel by Belva Plain
- Harvest, a 1950 novel by Galina Nikolaeva
- Harvest, a 1920 novel by Mary Augusta Ward
- The Harvest (Wilson novel), (1992) by author Robert Charles Wilson
- Harvest (Neopagan magazine), published from 1980 to 1992
- Second Harvest (novel), a 1930 novel by Jean Giono first published in English as Harvest

=== Music ===
- Harvest (band), a Christian band active from 1977 to 1995
- Harvest Records, a British-American record record label owned by EMI

==== Albums ====
- Harvest (Dragon Ash album), 2003
- Harvest (Neil Young album), 1972
- Harvest (Richard Davis album)
- Harvest (Shizuka Kudo album), 1989
- Harvest (Tokio album), 2006
- Harvest, a 2007 album by Naglfar
- The Harvest (Alove for Enemies album), 2005
- The Harvest (Boondox album), 2006
- The Harvest (Tribal Seeds album), 2009
- The Harvest, album by Qwel & Maker, 2004

==== Songs ====
- "Harvest" (Neil Young song), 1972 title track from the album of the same name
- "Harvest", from the 2001 album Blackwater Park by Opeth
- "Harvest", from the 2017 album Ultu Ulla by Rings of Saturn
- "Harvest", from the 1997 album In This Room by the 3rd and the Mortal
- "The Harvest", from the 2012 album Captors by Wolves at the Gate
- "Harvest: Concerto for Trombone", a concerto by American John Mackey (composer)

=== Television episodes ===
- "Harvest" (Andor), 2025
- "Harvest" (The Americans), 2018
- "Harvest" (CSI), from CSI: Crime Scene Investigation, 2004
- "Harvest" (Endeavour), 2017
- "Harvest" (Numbers), 2006
- "Harvest" (Roswell), 2000
- "Harvest" (Secret Invasion), 2023
- "Harvest", an episode of The Wind in the Willows
- "The Harvest" (Buffy the Vampire Slayer), 1997

=== Video games ===
- The Harvest, a 2010 video game by Luma Arcade and published by Microsoft Games Studios
- Harvest: Massive Encounter, a 2008 indie video game by Oxeye Game Studio

=== Other ===
- Harvest (play), by Manjula Padmanabhan
- Harvest, a painting by Vincent van Gogh; see Wheat Fields (Van Gogh series)
- The Harvest (Daubigny), an 1851 painting by Charles-François Daubigny
- The Harvest (audio drama), a 2004 Big Finish Productions audio drama based on the television series Doctor Who
- Harvest (sculpture), a relief sculpture by Jerzy Jarnuszkiewicz

== Science and technology ==
- Harvest project, a web cache research project
- Harvest (software), time tracking and invoicing software
- CA Harvest Software Change Manager, originally named CCC/Harvest, a CA software product
- Email-address harvesting, obtaining lists of e-mail addresses for purposes usually grouped as spam
- Energy harvesting, the use of captured ambient energy to power small devices
- IBM 7950 Harvest, a one-of-a-kind adjunct to the Stretch computer
- Organ procurement, also referred to as "organ harvesting", the collection of viable organs from dead or dying donors for organ transplantation
- Web scraping, also referred to as "web harvesting", a focused form of a web crawler search

== Organizations ==
- Harvest Crusades
- Harvest Christian Fellowship
- Harvest Publications, an imprint of William Morrow and Company

== See also ==
- Harvester (disambiguation)
