= Possession (British TV series) =

British television series

- Genre: Supernatural; Thriller
- Developed by: Karla Crome
- Written by: Karla Crome
- Directed by: Storm Saulter
- Starring: Gugu Mbatha-Raw; Jonny Lee Miller; Sheldon Shepherd; Bel Powley
- Country of origin: United Kingdom
- Original language: English
- No. of series: 1
- No. of episodes: 5

Production
- Executive producers: Ruth Kenley-Letts; Jenny van der Lande; Neil Blair; Karla Crome; Storm Saulter; Sam Hoyle; Serena Thompson; Gugu Mbatha-Raw; Jonny Lee Miller
- Producer: Kate Ogborn
- Running time: 44–51 minutes
- Production companies: Snowed-In Productions; Sky Studios

Original release
- Network: Sky Atlantic
- Release: 6 August – 20 August 2026

Possession is a British television five-part supernatural thriller written by Karla Crome and directed by Storm Saulter. It stars Gugu Mbatha-Raw, Jonny Lee Miller, Sheldon Shepherd, and Bel Powley. The series premiered on 6 August 2026 on Sky Atlantic.

== Premise ==
A lawyer investigates an inheritance claim in Jamaica.

== Cast and characters ==
=== Main ===
- Gugu Mbatha-Raw as Claudia
- Jonny Lee Miller as Oliver Connaught
- Sheldon Shepherd as Cudjoe East
- Bel Powley as Charlotte

=== Supporting ===
- Sean Gilder as Tom McKenzie
- Richard Dillane as Eugene Desfrienes
- Diveen Henry as Flora
- Jack Bandeira as Kenneth Connaught
- Shantol Jackson as Sarah
- Safina Simpson as Betina
- Jeff Crossley as Angelo
- Nadean Rawlins as Mercy
- Oluniké Adeliyi as Patsy Dawkins

== Production ==
Possession received a series order in December 2024 under the original title Inheritance. It is based on an idea by Jefferson Bannis, with Karla Crome as writer and Storm Saulter as director. It is produced by Snowed-In Productions, in association with Sky Studios. Crome and Saulter also executive produce alongside Ruth Kenley-Letts, Jenny van der Lande, Neil Blair, Sam Hoyle, Serena Thompson, Gugu Mbatha-Raw, and Jonny Lee Miller.

Mbatha-Raw and Miller were announced to lead the cast along with Bel Powley and Sheldon Shepherd in main roles while Nadean Rawlins, Sean Gilder, Olunike Adeliyi, Richard Dillane, Diveen Henry, Jack Bandeira, and Shantol Jackson joined the cast in supporting roles. In March 2026, the title of the series was changed to Possession while Jeff Crossley and Safina Simpson were confirmed to have joined the cast.

The series is set in the city of Bristol in the United Kingdom and Jamaica. Filming began in December 2024 with filming locations including Bristol in the United Kingdom and Jamaica.

== Episodes ==
No.	Title	Directed by	Written by	Original release date
1	"Episode 1"	Storm Saulter	Karla Crome	6 August 2026
2	"Episode 2"	Storm Saulter	Karla Crome	6 August 2026
3	"Episode 3"	Storm Saulter	Karla Crome	13 August 2026
4	"Episode 4"	Storm Saulter	Karla Crome	13 August 2026
5	"Episode 5"	Storm Saulter	Karla Crome	20 August 2026

== Broadcast ==
The series premiered on Sky Atlantic on 6 August 2026. On the same day, all episodes were released on NOW.
