= Simon Bellamy =

- Misfits character
- First appearance: Series 1 Episode 1
- Last appearance: Series 3 Episode 8
- Created by: Howard Overman
- Portrayed by: Iwan Rheon
- Power: Invisibility (series 1-2); Power immunity (series 3); Precognition (series 3); Time travel to the past (series 3)

In-universe information
- Aliases: Superhoodie, The Guy In The Mask
- Nickname: Barry
- Gender: Male
- Occupation: Unemployed
- Significant others: Alisha Daniels (girlfriend; deceased)

Simon Bellamy is a fictional character from the British Channel 4 science fiction comedy-drama Misfits, portrayed by Iwan Rheon. Simon was sentenced to community service for attempted arson which leads to him gaining the power of invisibility, reflective of his personality in that he often feels ignored. Simon has been involved in a storyline which saw him manipulated by his probation worker who he murders. In the third series finale Simon travels to the past and Rheon later confirmed that he would not be returning for the fourth series.

== Casting and character creation ==
Casting for the part was announced on 17 August 2009 by Digital Spy. Rheon helped writer Overman to create the character and commented that "we had a sit around the table with Howard the writer and he was very open to suggestions and you can see later on he really started writing for us as actors". Rheon later said that "Director Tom Green and I decided we’d base him on Ian Curtis, so he’s cool and has his own story, he’s the kind of character you really get to know if you talk to him about music, something that he really cares about. It’s not so much Ian Curtis as an individual we were aiming for, more the idea of his music. The feel of Joy Division, that depth". On 20 December 2011 Rheon confirmed that he would not be returning for the fourth series of Misfits. Rheon added that he was "grateful for the opportunity" given to him by Misfits and the "fun I had doing it".

== Development ==
=== Characterisation ===
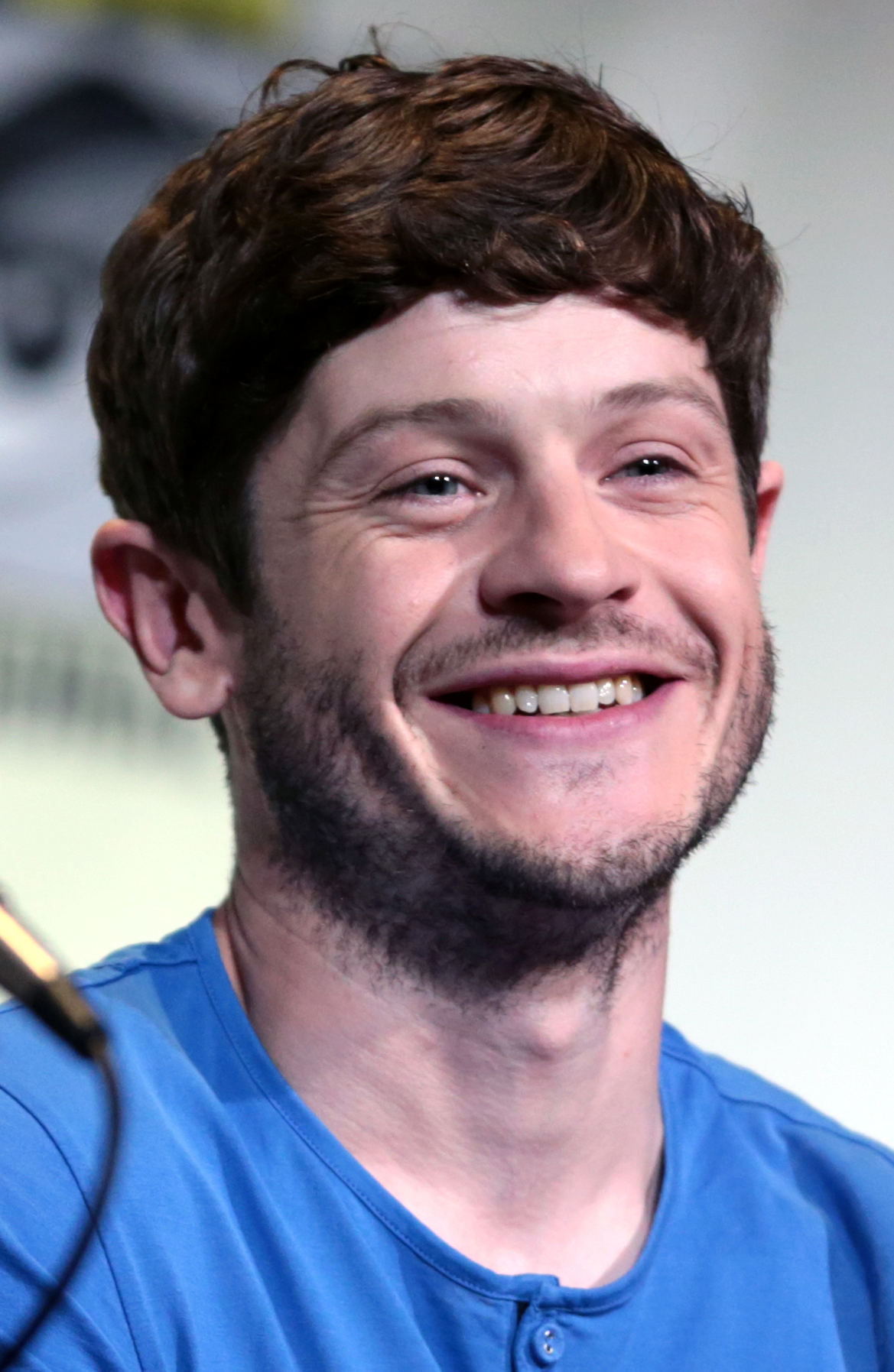
Iwan Rheon (pictured) felt that Simon begins to "become a lot more confident" but he still "needs to finish that journey to becoming the Superhoodie character"

E4's official website describes Simon as being "sharp, calculating minded, shy, unassuming Simon is a social outcast. Nervous to speak up, but desperate to make friends, Simon tries his hardest to be heard and accepted by the others, which helps to fuel everyone else’s suspicion he’s a little odd." Digital Spy described him as "painfully shy nerd Simon". The Times commented that "the quiet one who burnt down a house can suddenly become invisible". The Daily Telegraph describes him as being the "shy arsonist Simon". The Metro described him as "troubled", "intense" and a "teen neurotic". The Independent described Simon as a "introverted outsider" before later branding him a "quiet weirdo". MSN News described the character saying "Simon is a shy, twitchy sci-fi geek who is constantly the butt of everyone else's jokes". They added that his power allows him to "hide away from unwanted attention and observe the others unseen".

=== Superhoodie ===
On how Simon develops into Superhoodie, Rheon said "you do see him become a lot more confident and having this ambition to become this superhero character" but felt the character "needs to finish that journey to becoming the Superhoodie character". On playing both present and future Simon he also said "It was a great challenge. And also to kind of try and make the present Simon become the future Simon, if you know what I mean - have all those little beats where you can show a little flicker of it... The difficulty was - because the statuses were going from one to, like, ten - to then also keep that sense of Simon in that really confident character. That was quite a challenge". Rheon felt Simon changed most of all of the show's characters. Rheon felt the show could have "done more" with the Superhoodie storyline but enjoyed the storyline as it developed.

== Storylines ==
Simon is bullied by Matt (Jamie Blackley) while at school. Matt texts Simon asking him to meet him at a bar. Matt tells Simon he 'accidentally' texted him, embarrassing and angering Simon. Simon sets fire to Matt's house but puts the fire out before any serious damage is done. Simon is given community service as punishment. At some point before Simon's community service, he is in a mental institution along with Lucy (Evelyn Hoskins).

While doing his community service, Simon is caught in a storm. Simon gains the power of invisibility. The group's probation worker, Tony (Danny Sapani) is also caught in the storm and becomes crazed. Tony attacks the group and in self-defense, Kelly Bailey (Lauren Socha) kills him. Simon begins speaking to 'Shygirl18' online, who turns out to be Sally. Tony's body is due to be dug up, the group move him before reburying him. Simon takes Tony's card and uses it to fake activity so it is presumed he is alive. The group's new probation worker, Tony's fiancée Sally (Alex Reid), discovers Tony's credit card in Simon's locker. Sally continues to try to prove the group's part in Tony's death by becoming close to Simon. Sally steals Simon's phone and watches his recorded videos. She finds a video in which Nathan Young (Robert Sheehan) professes the group's part in Tony's death. Simon finds Sally watching the video and tells her that the group are his friends. Sally hits Simon and tries to escape with his phone. Simon and Sally struggle for possession of the phone. In the struggle Simon pushes Sally who hits her head on the door, killing her.

Simon meets Lucy for the first time, since they were in a mental institution together. Lucy is infatuated with Simon and she becomes angry that he didn't remain in contact with her after he left the institution. Lucy causes the group trouble by impersonating them as she has the power to shape-shift. The group learn of Simon's involvement in Sally's death as does Lucy. Lucy decides to impersonate Simon and hand herself in to the police in the hope he will be sent back to the mental institution with her. Simon apologises and she decides not to go ahead with her plans. Alisha Daniels (Antonia Thomas) meets Superhoodie and later realises he is a future version of Simon. Alisha and future Simon begin a relationship, which ends when he is killed saving Alisha from Tim (Matt Cross). Simon loses his virginity to Jessica (Zawe Ashton). Brian (Jordan Metcalfe) goes public about his power. The group are also forced to go public. Simon follows Alisha to future Simon's flat where she confesses who Simon will become. Brian goes on a killing spree in which he kills Alisha. Simon is stabbed saving Curtis Donovan (Nathan Stewart-Jarrett) from Brian. Curtis, who has the power of time travel reverses this timeline. The group finish community service. Simon and Alisha are in a relationship and in the three months since the group finished community service, Alisha has told Simon about his future self. The group sell their powers to Seth (Matthew McNulty) although Simon is reluctant. Alisha lies that future Simon told her they should sell their powers, prompting Simon to do so. A follower of Elliot (Edward Hogg) kills Nikki (Ruth Negga) and the group realise they must get their powers back. Elliot attempts to rape Alisha, prompting Simon to vow to kill him. Elliot is killed accidentally and the group take his money, using it to buy completely new powers.

Simon now has the power of precognition. Simon stops Peter (Michael Marcus) from being mugged while he is wearing Superhoodie's costume. Peter realises Simon is Superhoodie and begins manipulating Simon's life through his power of drawing which soon after becomes reality. Simon is manipulated into attacking Alisha and the rest of the group. The group realise Peter is manipulating Simon, and so they destroy Peter's drawings, ending Peter's control over Simon. Peter kidnaps Alisha and tells Simon to come and save her. Simon arrives dressed as Superhoodie to find Peter dressed in a similar attire to Superhoodie's. Simon kills Peter in the struggle, as Peter had planned having drawn this so Simon would fulfill his future timeline. Alisha asks Simon to burn his Superhoodie outfit and never travel back to the past. Simon agrees, but he keeps his Superhoodie attire without telling Alisha. Curtis's old power is used by a man who travels back in time to kill Hitler. The present is changed and instead of Hitler being killed before initiating the war, the Nazis win the war. Simon is a conscripted soldier, but later helps the group save Seth. Kelly uses Curtis's old power to rewind this timeline. Simon helps Rudy Wade (Joseph Gilgun) find Leah (Amy Manson) after she gives him a super powered STD. A medium called Jonas (Mark Heap) tells Simon that a spirit wants to contact him. Jonas brings back the spirits of Sally, Tony and Rachel (Jessica Brown Findlay). Sally tells Simon that she forgives him before seducing him and filming their encounter. She sends the footage to Alisha's phone who ends their relationship. Sally attempts to murder Alisha to hurt Simon, but Tony stops her and the pair move onto the spirit world. Simon and Alisha make up after Simon admits he and Sally didn't have sex. Rachel decides that in order to move onto the spirit world, she must have revenge. Rachel confronts Curtis, Kelly and Rudy. When Simon and Alisha arrive, Rachel slits Alisha's throat, killing her. Simon reveals his identity as Superhoodie to the group. Simon realizes he must travel back in time and obtains a time travel power although he can't return as the power doesn't allow him to travel to the future. Simon travels to the past where he buys the power of immunity from others' powers from Seth so he can touch Alisha and she will fall in love with him.

== Reception ==
UGO.com named Simon Bellamy one of the best TV nerds. Rheon was nominated for Outstanding Actor in the fiction category at the Monte-Carlo Television Festival in 2011. The Herald described Simon as being "the quiet, shy one who everyone ignores anyway, can become invisible." while commenting on his newfound power. Tim Dowling of The Guardian described him as the "weird one" of the group of "foul-mouthed young criminals". The Guardian described him as a "Moody loner, who turns invisible". Neela Debnath, writing for The Independent, commented that even though in a parallel universe the Nazis won the war the characters remained the same where Simon worked for the Nazis but "was conflicted, on the one hand he had to follow orders but on the other hand he found it difficult because he knew that what he was doing was wrong". Digital Spy felt that Simon's relationship with Alisha was "extremely touching" and added that the relationship included "one of the best sex scenes on television this year". The Guardian described Superhoodie's storyline and the show's future after Sheehan quit saying they were "confident the show can survive, especially as series three will build on the story of (the non-nerdy, very cool) Simon from the future."
