= Alisha Daniels =

- Misfits character
- First appearance: Series 1 Episode 1
- Last appearance: Series 3 Episode 8
- Created by: Howard Overman
- Portrayed by: Antonia Thomas
- Power: Forced sexual frenzy by contact (series 1-2); Telepathic perspective (series 3)

In-universe information
- Gender: Female
- Occupation: Bartender

Alisha Daniels is a fictional character from the British Channel 4 science fiction comedy-drama Misfits, portrayed by Antonia Thomas. Alisha gains an ASBO for repeated drunk-driving which leads to her receiving community service, where she is involved in a freak storm giving her the ability to make those who make bare contact with her skin go into a sexual frenzy towards her. She has also been involved in a relationship with fellow youth offender Curtis Donovan (Nathan Stewart-Jarrett) and later Simon Bellamy (Iwan Rheon). In the Series 3 finale, Alisha is killed by Rachel (Jessica Brown Findlay) and Thomas later confirmed her exit from the series.

== Casting and character creation ==
Casting for the part was announced on 17 August 2009 by Digital Spy. Thomas trained at the Bristol Old Vic Theatre School and won the part the day after leaving. On receiving the part Thomas said she felt "lucky" that the casting directors "took a chance" on her. Director Tom Green felt that Alisha could have read one way but Thomas brought a "much more complex character" and added more "vulnerability" to Alisha. He added that Thomas brought "another depth" to the character. Thomas said she and other cast members were undecided on returning for a third series, adding that it is "quite difficult so early on to make a decision for next year and to know what you're doing. It's stressful but also a lovely position to be in". Fellow cast member Iwan Rheon revealed that Overman who created the character discussed how to write their parts with the cast and later began writing for them as actors. In the Series 3 finale, Alisha is killed. Thomas later confirmed her exit, saying she would not be returning for a fourth series although she has had an "amazing time" at the show.

== Development ==
=== Characterisation ===
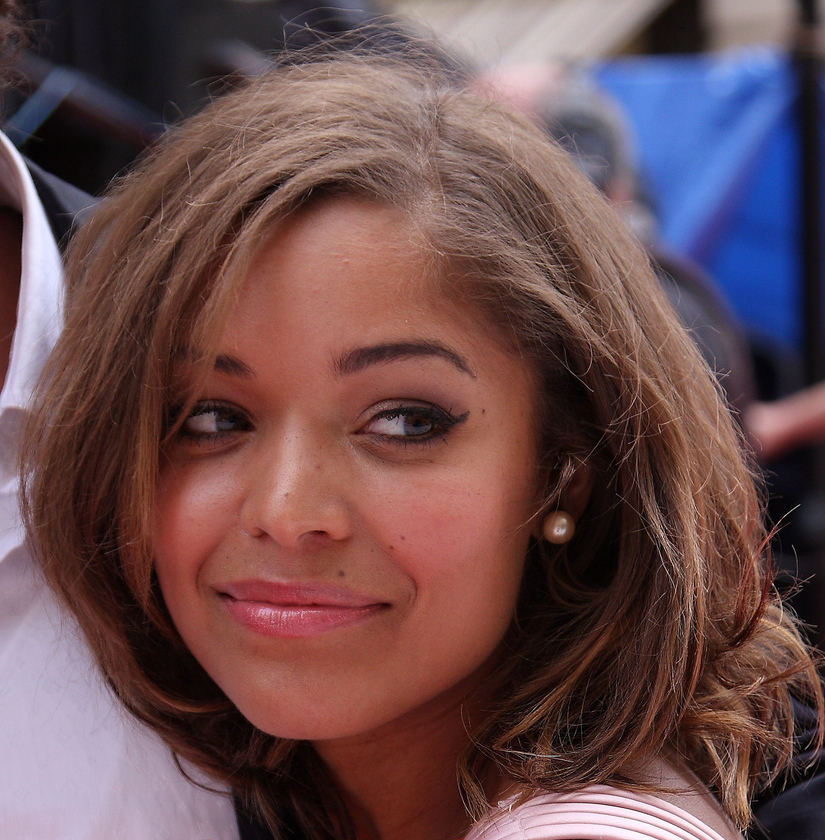
Antonia Thomas (pictured) felt that Alisha is "totally self-obsessed and only cares about her image" but said as time goes on Alisha "slowly loses the front and we start to see her vulnerable side".

As long as Alisha's the centre of everyone's world, then life is sweet. This party girl's biggest concern is that she retains the title of Miss Shagable for another year running. When the party's over, she'll jump into her car and find another one. Which is what got her into this minging jumpsuit and ankle tag in the first place. Our superficial and sassy stunner (and don't forget potty-mouthed) is now stuck with the worst come down of all: a day job that might as well be shovelling shit for all she cares. Not only is Alisha cut off from her mates, forced to associate with losers all day and has a curfew; she's also got a power that could seriously damage her social life. Because when people touch Alisha's skin, they're going to be so filled with lust, they can't think straight. Alisha soon discovers it's much more of a curse than a blessing as she has to adapt to life with her new power, forcing her to reassess her relationships with the opposite sex.

— E4 on Alisha.

Thomas described Alisha saying she is a "difficult young lady". She added that Alisha is a "princessy character" who was very "spoilt" and has had everything she wants. She explained that this meant Alisha "went off the rails" and is now "into partying and drugs". Thomas described the character as "one of those girls from the uber popular crowd at school". She added that Alisha is "totally self-obsessed and only cares about her image and using her sexuality to get what she wants". Thomas commented that "when she [Alisha] breaks the law, she ends up doing community service with a bunch of others who are totally different to her and slowly she loses the front and we start to see her vulnerable side". The cast said they felt their characters were metaphors for what teenagers went through. Thomas expanded on this saying while at school she felt "there was quite a lot of pressure early on and from quite a young age to use your sexuality and to be sexy - I think too young actually. I think girls feel like they need to be attractive to boys to be popular".

The Metro described her as "foxy, image-crazed Alisha" while Orange described her as a "super sexy delinquent". The Daily Telegraph describes her as being a "party girl" with The Herald similarly describing her as a "Slutty party girl". The Times described her as a "cheeky young woman who has a voracious sexual appetite". Tim Dowling of The Guardian described her as the "slutty one" of the group of "foul-mouthed young criminals". MSN News described Alisha's power saying Alisha "realises this is more of a curse than a blessing as she can no longer touch anybody or be touched without them clambering all over her, trying to take their clothes off".

== Storylines ==
While at college, Alisha took Rudy Wade's (Joseph Gilgun) virginity, and ignored him the following day. Alisha is banned from driving. At a later date, Alisha is pulled over by a police officer while drunk driving and although she attempts to flirt with the police officer, she is given community service. While on community service Alisha is caught in a storm which gives her the power of causing those she touches to go into a sexual frenzy. Alisha flirts with Curtis Donovan (Nathan Stewart-Jarrett). Alisha continues to flirt with Curtis and when he rejects her advances she touches him, causing him to go into a sexual frenzy. The pair proceed to have sex. Curtis becomes angry at Alisha for using her power on him. Alisha has sex with Ben (Jamie Davis). Curtis and Alisha argue. Alisha is nearly raped by both Curtis and Ben because of her power. Alisha escapes and tells Curtis that her power is causing her problems. Alisha and Curtis decide to begin a relationship without becoming physical. Curtis's ex-girlfriend Sam (Anna Koval) makes Curtis feel guilty, activating his power to turn back time. Curtis stops her going to prison and when he arrives back in the present he is now in a relationship with both Sam and Alisha. Alisha forgives Curtis after and he ends his relationship with Sam. Rachel (Jessica Brown Findlay) uses her power of suggestion to change how Alisha behaves. When Rachel is killed her control over Alisha ends.

Lucy (Evelyn Hoskins), who has the power to shape-shift, takes on Alisha's appearance and gives Simon Bellamy (Iwan Rheon) oral sex. Lucy tells Curtis that Simon attacked. Curtis attacks Simon but is stopped by Kelly Bailey (Lauren Socha). Alisha meets Superhoodie who she realises is immune to her power. When Superhoodie saves her from an attacker, Alisha discovers he is a future version of Simon. Alisha and future Simon begin a relationship. Alisha and Curtis end their relationship. The group are kidnapped by Tim (Matt Cross). Tim threatens Alisha who escapes. Tim corners Alisha and is about to shoot her when future Simon arrives. Future Simon takes the bullet and Tim leaves. Alisha agrees to keep Superhoodie's identity secret. Future Simon dies and Alisha burns his body. Alisha saves Simon's life when Dave (Adrian Rawlins) is about to attack him. When Brian (Jordan Metcalfe) goes public about his power the group are forced to go public. Alisha is followed to future Simon's flat by Simon and when he questions her about the flat, she reveals he will become Superhoodie. Alisha is killed by Brian. Curtis rewinds the timeline and the group stop Brian going public. Alisha and the group finish community service. Alisha meets Seth (Matthew McNulty) who has the ability to deal powers. He removes her power and the group follow suit, selling their powers. Nikki (Ruth Negga) is killed. The group realise this could have been prevented if they still had their powers. Elliot (Edward Hogg) buys Alisha's old power and attempts to rape Alisha. Alisha escapes and tells Simon who vows to kill Elliot. Elliot is accidentally killed and the group take Elliot's money. The group decide to buy different powers.

Alisha gains the power of clairvoyance. Alisha meets Rudy for the first time since college. He becomes upset and leaves hurriedly. When Alisha sees Rudy later on, he opens up to the group, telling Alisha she ruined his life and that he attempted suicide because of her. Alisha goes to find Rudy the next day. She walks in on him cradling a dying Charlie (Nathalie Emmanuel) who has been stabbed by Tanya (Katie Moore). Tanya, who has the power to freeze those around her, freezes Rudy and Alisha, putting them both in nooses while balancing on chairs, so if they fall they will hang to death. Rudy kicks Tanya who falls and cracks her head open on the floor, killing her. The chair Rudy was balanced on falls and he begins to hang. Alisha tries to save him, telling him to wrap his legs around her. Alisha apologises to Rudy for her actions, admitting that she remembered Rudy and at the time did not care who she hurt. Rudy accepts her apology and lets go. Rudy's duplicate returns and saves Rudy's life. Simon ends his relationship with Alisha after he is manipulated by Peter (Michael Marcus). Peter's influence over Simon ends so Peter kidnaps Alisha. Simon saves Alisha although he kills Peter in the process. Alisha asks Simon to destroy Superhoodie's costume so he won't have to travel back in time and die saving Alisha. In an alternate timeline where the Nazis won World War II Alisha is dating Shaun (Craig Parkinson). Alisha joins the group in attempting to fix the timeline in which they succeed. The spirits of Sally (Alex Reid), Tony (Danny Sapani) and Rachel are brought back. Alisha ends her relationship with Simon after seeing Simon kissing Sally. Sally tries to push Alisha off the roof of the community centre. Tony stops her before Sally and Tony move on to the spirit world. Alisha and Simon reunite. Rachel decides in order to move on to the spirit world she must have revenge on the group. Rachel confronts Curtis, Kelly and Rudy with a knife. Alisha arrives and Rachel slices her throat, killing her. Rachel moves on to the spirit world and the group bury Alisha in the woods. Simon decides he must now become Superhoodie, so he travels back to the past where the previous events play out again.

== Reception ==
Thomas received overwhelming positive reception for her portrayal, many noting her ability to bring sympathy, depth and likability to the character. Thomas was nominated for Outstanding Actress in the fiction category at the Monte-Carlo Television Festival in 2011 for her portrayal of Alisha.

The Guardian felt Alisha gave them "something to cheer about" as she is a female character in a British science fiction serial who doesn't "exist just to be rescued". They added that Alisha's "notorious "sex power", meanwhile, proved problematic for feminists everywhere – and deeply uncomfortable to watch. Yet her role as the reluctant observer forced her to learn about herself. In choosing her new power (which allows her to see what other people are doing) and a relationship with Simon, she's also chosen to embrace both the superhero life and her own vulnerability, despite knowing that disaster likely awaits in both. The ability to put herself in others' shoes reflects her newfound empathy and her determination not to lose it, while putting her at the plotting heart of the gang's shenanigans. Not bad for the formerly untouchable party girl". They added that throughout the first series of Misfits, Alisha "certainly wasn't nice". The Guardian also felt given Alisha's initial ability, Nathan "be better off without one".

Neela Debnath, writing for The Independent, commented that even though in a parallel universe the Nazis won the war the characters remained the same where Alisha "remained a sexual object and had to use her womanly wiles to survive".

Digital Spy felt that Alisha's relationship with Simon was "extremely touching" and added that the relationship included "one of the best sex scenes on television this year". Writing for The Guardian Tim Dowling said "Alisha's infatuation with him [Simon] gives rise to a love scene that I can only describe as extremely grown-up".

On Alisha's exit Digital Spy said it was "difficult to overestimate what a shock this was - Alisha lies in Simon's arms bleeding out as the other Misfits stand stock still, devastated and shocked and in tears. Eventually, Alisha dies and it's so, so, so sad". They added that they "loved" Alisha's speech to Tony telling him the group had tried their best because it made "what was to come all the more shocking".
