= Storm Saulter =

Jamaican filmmaker and photographer

- Born: September 21, 1983 (age 42); Negril, Jamaica
- Occupations: Filmmaker, photographer

Storm Saulter (born September 21, 1983) is a Jamaican filmmaker and photographer. He wrote and directed the 2010 film Better Mus' Come and directed the 2018 film Sprinter. In 2020, Sprinter was released on Netflix.

== Life and career ==
Saulter was born in Negril, Jamaica, on September 21, 1983. One of his brothers, Astro, is an artist and was diagnosed with cerebral palsy when he was young. Storm attended The Los Angeles Film School and graduated in 2001 with a focus in editing and cinematography.

He released his debut film Better Mus’ Come, in 2010, with a theatrical release in the U.S. in 2013. In 2018, the film Sprinter was released, which he directed and co-wrote. The film was distributed in the U.S. in 2019 and was released on Netflix in 2020.

In addition to his own filmmaking work, Saulter co-founded the New Caribbean Cinema collective, created in 2013 to showcase new Caribbean filmmakers.

In 2019, Saulter stated that he was working on an adaptation of John Crow's Devil, the first novel by Jamaican author Marlon James.

=== Style and reception ===
Saulter's work focuses on Jamaican stories. He is often a director for his films in addition to a writer. Variety magazine writer Courtney Howard described his film Sprinter as intricate and character-driven, stating that the film has a "pulsating energy".

His film “Sprinter” won several awards, including Best Director, Audience Award, and the Grand Jury Prize from the American Black Film Festival, the New Visions Award from the Bahamas International Film Festival, and Jury Prize from Pan African Film Festival. Saulter's photographs and films have been shown at various art exhibitions, including at the Jamaica Biennial (2014 and 2017) and Art Basel.

== Selected work ==
=== Music videos ===
- "Shaka Zulu Pickney", Tarrus Riley's 2010 song - director
- "Who Knows", Protoje featuring Chronixx (2014) - director
- "Peter Pan", Arcade Fire (2018) - director
- "Skankin’ Sweet", Chronixx (2018) - director
- "Dynamite", Sean Paul featuring Sia (2021) - director

=== Films ===
- Better Mus’ Come (2010) - director, co-screenwriter
- Sprinter (2018) - director, writer
