= Luma Arcade =

Video game developer

- Type: Private
- Industry: Video games
- Founded: 2006
- Headquarters: Johannesburg, South Africa
- Area served: Worldwide

Luma Arcade was a video game developer with origins in South Africa. The company was founded in 2006 and headquartered in San Francisco, with development offices in Johannesburg and a satellite office in Portland.

== History ==
Luma Arcade was a developer of video games from 2006 to 2013. Initially a division of Luma Studios, a South African animation services provider, Luma Arcade was later spun out as an independent company with staff in San Francisco, Johannesburg, and Portland before being acquired in a private sale in 2013 to an undisclosed buyer.

== Games Developed ==
Title	Year	Genre	Platform	Publisher
Bladeslinger	2012	Action Shooter	iOS, Android	Kerosene
Racer	2011	Racing	Android	Google
The Harvest	2010	Action RPG	Windows Phone 7, Microsoft Windows	Microsoft Games Studios
REV	2009	Racing	Microsoft Windows, Mac	N/A
Flipt	2009	Puzzle Platformer	iOS	Instant Action
Marble Blast Mobile	2008	Puzzle Platformer	iOS	Instant Action
Mini #37	2007	Racing	Microsoft Windows	N/A
