= Harvest (2026 film) =

Serbian movie from 2026 in English language

- Serbian: Žetva
- Directed by: Paul Kampf
- Based on: Srpsko srce Johanovo
- Produced by: Paul Kampf, Dragan Ivanović
- Production company: TS media
- Release date: 17 March 2026 (Belgrade)
- Running time: 118
- Country: Serbia
- Language: English
- Budget: $13 million

Harvest (Serbian: Žetva) is a 2026 Serbian drama–thriller film directed and written by Paul Kampf. The film is based on the novel The Serbian Heart of Johannes by Veselin Dželetović.

It follows Johann von Wagner, portrayed by Matthew McNulty, a man who begins experiencing disturbing dreams and visions after undergoing a heart transplant. Driven to uncover their meaning, he embarks on a journey that leads him to Kosovo and Metohija, where he confronts the dark reality of illegal organ trafficking linked to the so-called “Yellow House.”

The film premiered on March 17, 2026 at the MTS Theater, while distribution in theaters began on March 19 of the same year.

The film had its world premiere at the Beloit International Film Festival in Wisconsin on March 26, 2026, with the director and most of the film crew in attendance.

== Plot ==
The film follows Johann von Wagner, a wealthy German baron who undergoes an illegal heart transplant while on the brink of death. Although the operation is successful, Johann soon begins experiencing disturbing dreams and personality changes, including visions of unfamiliar landscapes, an Orthodox church, and a young boy who calls him “father.”

Troubled by these visions, Johann hires investigators and traces the origin of the heart to Kosovo and Metohija. Traveling there under a false identity, he eventually locates the boy and his family in a remote Serbian village. He discovers that the child’s father—whose heart he now carries—was abducted during the conflict and killed as part of an organ trafficking operation linked to the so-called “Yellow House.”

Confronted with the truth, Johann realizes that his survival came at the cost of another man’s life. As he witnesses the suffering of the family and the wider community, he becomes entangled in the reality of the criminal network behind the trade.

In the end, Johann seeks redemption by helping the boy and his mother and undergoing a personal transformation. The film concludes with his baptism into the Orthodox faith, symbolizing his attempt to atone and repay the moral debt tied to the life he was given.

== Roles ==
Actor	Role
Matthew McNulty	Johan
Rebecca Calder	Greta
Aleksandar Jovanovic	Sabi
Henning Baum	Dr. Bauer
Bejo Dohmen	Hans
Jovana Gavrilovic	Sofia
Paul Leonard Murray	David
Christian Wancl Nekrasov	Professor Werner
Angus Macfadyen	Sergeant
Jovan Veljkovic	Karl
Mary Stickley	Drita
Antonio Scarpa	Francesco
David Thomas Jenkins	Dardanus
Mary Bold	Adelaide
Jasmina Avramovic	mother
Carrie Doyle	Kiran
Vuitton Frank	Charlotte
Robin Rainsford	Martha
Radoje Cupic	boss
Miodrag Dragicevic	drill operator

== Reception ==
The film received significant media attention for its portrayal of the controversial "Yellow House" organ trafficking allegations. Nevena Daković, writing for NIN, described the film as an "untold story" that effectively blends psychological drama with political thriller elements. Daković specifically praised the film's atmospheric tension and the lead performance of Matthew McNulty, noting that the narrative serves as a cinematic bridge between personal trauma and collective historical memory.

During its international premiere at the Beloit International Film Festival, the film was highlighted by American broadcaster WIFR-TV as a key selection in the festival's "Center Stage" lineup, which focuses on impactful global cinema. Furthermore, critics noted the performance of Angus Macfadyen, who portrays a weathered sergeant, adding a layer of international gravitas to the production. Serbian media outlets, including Euronews Serbia, emphasized the film's high production value and its objective to provide international visibility to the victims of the conflict in Kosovo and Metohija, comparing the film's narrative structure to the original source material, the novel "Srpsko srce Johanovo".

While some reviewers pointed out the film's heavy emotional weight, the consensus among Serbian critics was that Kampf's direction maintained a balanced approach to a sensitive subject, focusing on the protagonist's moral redemption and spiritual journey rather than relying solely on political messaging.
