= Karla Crome =

British actress and writer (born 1988)

- Born: Karla Patsy Crome; 22 June 1988 (age 38); London, England
- Education: Italia Conti Academy of Theatre Arts
- Occupations: Actress, screenwriter, playwright
- Years active: 2009–present

Karla Patsy Crome (born 22 June 1988) is a British actress and writer, best known for her work on Sky Atlantic's Hit & Miss, playing series regular Jess on E4's Misfits, and appearances in a number of other television series and films, mainly in the United Kingdom, including the award-winning Murder. In 2012, Screen International named Crome as one of the "UK Stars of Tomorrow".

== Early life ==
She graduated with a Bachelor of Arts (hons) acting course from the Italia Conti Academy of Theatre Arts in Clapham, London.

== Television ==
Crome played the lead, Coleen, in Birger Larsen's BAFTA Award-winning (2013) production of Murder for BBC2. Alison Graham said in The Radio Times: "...it stayed with me for days, dammit. Every brittle little shard of it, thanks largely to one of the most astounding, affecting acting performances I have ever seen, from rising star Karla Crome as Coleen..."

On 22 May 2012, it was announced that Crome would appear in the fourth series of E4 drama Misfits in the regular role of Jess.

Crome appears in ITV five-part series Lightfields as Clare. Again, she has received excellent reviews for her performance with Matt D. saying: "...the standout was definitely Karla Crome, who has shone in everything from Murder to Misfits, here playing the emotionally damaged Claire..."

She has also joined the cast of BBC series Prisoners' Wives for the show's second series, playing the role of Aisling.

In February 2014, it was revealed that Crome would be joining the cast of CBS' Under the Dome as a series regular for the show's second season.

Crome is also a writer. She wrote episode five of Hooten & the Lady for Red Planet Pictures and Sky One. She would also write episodes of Safe, The Stranger and prison drama Screw.

=== Theatre ===
She has also appeared on stage in Manchester Royal Exchange's production of Powder Monkey, as well as The Royal Court and the National Theatre. In 2016, Crome played Alice in Linda at the Royal Court Theatre, and Constanze in Amadeus at the National Theatre. In 2018, Crome played Amina in Dance Nation at the Almeida Theatre.

Her play, If Chloe Can, was presented by the National Youth Theatre. Another play Crome authored, Mush & Me, premiered at the 2014 Edinburgh Festival Fringe. It later transferred to Holden Street Theatres, Adelaide.

== Filmography ==
=== Films ===
Key
†	Denotes films that have not yet been released

Film
Year	Title	Role	Notes
2010	Exposed	Dee	Short film
2012	The Pub	(unknown)	Short film
2012	Joint Enterprise	Coleen	
2012	Gambit	Vron	
2017	National Theatre Live: Amadeus	Constanze Weber/Mozart	
2018	Vita & Virginia	Dorothy Wellesley	
2019	Nobody's Darling	Girlfriend	Short film
2020	Hayley Alien	Hayley	Short film
2021	Canvas 5	–	Short film; writer and director
TBA	The Last Disturbance of Madeline Hynde †	TBA	Post-production

=== Television ===
Key
†	Denotes television productions that have not yet been released

Television
Year	Title	Role	Notes
2009	Dog Endz	Hannah	Television film
2010	Casualty	Chloe Parker	Series 24; episode 33: "Clean Slate"
2011	Doctors	Mo'nique	Series 12; episode 196: "Saints and Sinners"
2012	Hit & Miss	Riley	Mini-series; episodes 1–6
2012	Monroe	Donna Holmes	Series 2; episodes 1, 2 & 6
2012	Murder	Coleen	Mini-series; pilot episode: "Joint Enterprise"
2012–2013	Misfits	Jess	Main role; series 4 & 5, 16 episodes
2013	Lightfields	Clare Mullen	Episodes 1–5
2013	Prisoners' Wives	Aisling	Main role; series 2, episodes 1–4
2014	Under the Dome	Rebecca Pine	Main role; season 2, episodes 1–13
2015	You, Me and the Apocalypse	Layla, Hawkwind	Series 1; 5 episodes
2016	The Level	Nancy Devlin	Episodes 1–6
2016	Hooten & the Lady	–	Mini-series; episode 5: "Ethiopia". Writer
2018	Thunderbirds Are Go	Sophie (voice)	Series 3; episode 3: "Path of Destruction"
2018	Urban Myths	Sade	Series 2; episode 2: "Backstage at Live Aid"
2018	Safe	–	Mini-series, episode 6; writer
2019	The Victim	Rebecca Myers	Mini-series, episodes 1–4
2019–2023	Carnival Row	Tourmaline Larou	Main role. Series 1 & 2; 18 episodes
2020	The Stranger	–	Mini-series, episode 3; writer
2022	Screw	–	Series 1, episode 4; writer
2022–2025	Am I Being Unreasonable?	Lucy	Series 1 & 2; 12 episodes
2025	Toxic Town	Pattie Walker	Mini-series
2025	Lazarus	Bella	Mini-series
2026	Something Very Bad Is Going to Happen	Nell Cunningham	Mini-series; 8 episodes
2026	Possession	–	Mini-series; writer
