= Nathan McMullen =

British actor (born 1988)

- Born: 13 June 1988 (age 38)
- Occupation: Actor
- Years active: 2010–present
- Notable work: Finn in Misfits; Wolf the Elf in Doctor Who
- Children: 2

Nathan McMullen (born 13 June 1988) is an actor, known for television roles such as Finn in Misfits and barman in Kelly + Victor.

In 2012, McMullen appeared in the fourth season of Misfits in the regular role of Finn. McMullen plays the part of Wolf the Elf in an episode of Doctor Who.

== Career ==
In 2003, at the age of 15, Nathan McMullen was named "Young Comic of the Year" by Liverpool Echo during the Liverpool Comic Festival. More than 300 teenagers aged 14 to 18 competed in the contest for 12 months. For his win, Nathan got 250 pounds in pennies. He studied acting at Liverpool Community College (Now known as The City of Liverpool College) and moved on to study at the Manchester School of Theatre.

His first professional roles came in 2010, when he starred in the TV series Casualty and played Jack in Jack and the Beanstalk at the West Yorkshire Playhouse in Leeds. In 2011, he started working for the Everyman Theatre, where he starred as Witch 3 and Feance in Macbeth.

In 2015, McMullen participated in the stage adaptation of the 1994 comedy film The Hudsucker Proxy by the Coen brothers. The premier of the play was delayed because McMullen was injured during rehearsals. In 2016, McMullen was a member of the cast of the classic play by Alan Bleasdale Down the Dock Road.

Nathan McMullen continued his work for Everyman Theatre in 2018. During that season, he starred in the plays Paint Your Wagon (as Mike Mooney), The Big I Am (based on Peer Gynt) and A Clockwork Orange. He also works as a tutor in an acting school Act Up North, which has divisions in Manchester, Liverpool and Leeds.

== Filmography ==
=== TV ===
Year	Title	Role	Notes
2010	Casualty	Devlan O'Connor	Episode: "Reasons Unknown", "Entry Wounds"
2010	Coronation Street: A Knight's Tale	Phil	Video
2012	Shameless	Angelo	Episode: "9.11", "#9.4"
2012	Kelly + Victor	Barman	
2012–2013	Misfits	Finn Samson	Season 4, Season 5
2014	The Driver	Joseph Paslowski	Episode: "#1.1", "#1.2"
2014	Doctor Who	Wolf	Episode: Last Christmas
2014	Doctor Who Extra	Himself	Episode: "Last Christmas"
2020	Rose: A Love Story	Driver	
2025	Sister Boniface Mysteries	Brett Hyde	Episode: "Biff! Pow! Zap!"

=== Stage ===
Year	Play	Role	Venue
2010	Jack and the Beanstalk	Jack	West Yorkshire Playhouse (Leeds)
2011	Macbeth	Witch 3 & Fleance	Everyman Theatre (Liverpool)
2015	The Hudsucker Proxy	?	Everyman Theatre
2016	Down the Dock Road	Davie	Everyman Theatre
2018	A Clockwork Orange	Georgie	Everyman Theatre
2018	Paint Your Wagon	Mike Mooney	Everyman Theatre
2018	The Big I Am	Peer Gynt	Everyman Theatre
2021	Hushabye Mountain	Danny	Hope Mill Theatre
