= Iwan Rheon =

Welsh actor and musician (born 1985)

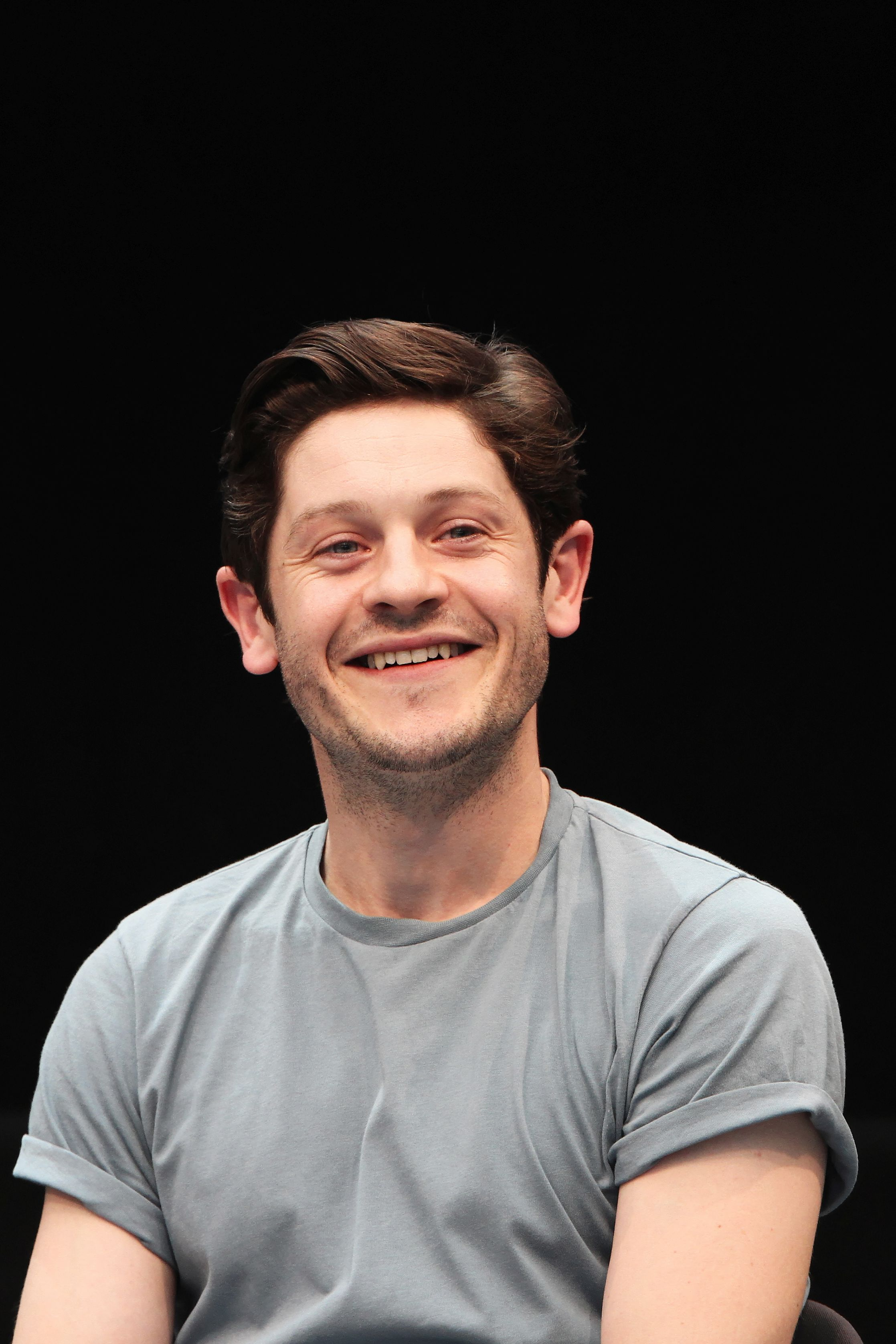
- Rheon in 2019
- Born: 13 May 1985 (age 41); Carmarthen, Wales, U.K.
- Education: London Academy of Music and Dramatic Art
- Occupations: Actor; singer; musician
- Years active: 2002–present
- Children: 1
- Musical career
- Genres: Indie folk; acoustic rock
- Instruments: Vocals; guitar; piano

Iwan Rheon (Welsh: [ˈɪu.an ˈr̥ɛ.ɔn]; born 13 May 1985) is a Welsh actor and musician. He is best known for his roles as Simon Bellamy in the E4 series Misfits (2009–2011), Ramsay Bolton in the HBO series Game of Thrones (2013–2016), and Mötley Crüe guitarist Mick Mars in the film The Dirt (2019). He has also appeared in the series Vicious, Riviera, Inhumans, and Those About to Die.

== Early life ==
Rheon was born in Carmarthen, Dyfed, southwestern Wales, on 13 May 1985, the son of Einir and Rheon Tomos. When he was five years old, his family moved to Cardiff. His older brother, Aled, is a musician; the two performed together on the 2015 single "Rhodd". Rheon attended Ysgol Gyfun Gymraeg Glantaf, a Welsh-speaking school, where he began acting in school drama productions at age 17. He was later spotted by a talent scout at a National Eisteddfod of Wales.

== Career ==
=== Acting ===
At age 17, Rheon joined the Welsh language soap Pobol Y Cwm, in which he originated the role of Macsen White, but later left to train at the London Academy of Music and Dramatic Art. His first notable stage part came in Eight Miles High, which was staged in 2008 at the Royal Court Theatre in Liverpool. Also in 2008, he was cast as the haunted Moritz Stiefel in the London production of the Tony Award-winning rock musical Spring Awakening. He played this role from January 2009 at the Lyric Hammersmith and continued when the show was transferred to the Novello Theatre, until it closed in May 2009, five months earlier than planned. He earned a What's on Stage Award nomination for Best Supporting Actor in a Musical, which was eventually won by Oliver Thornton (Priscilla Queen of the Desert). For his performance he won the award for Best Supporting Actor in a Musical at the 2010 Olivier Awards.

Immediately after Spring Awakening, Rheon was cast in the E4 channel's Misfits, a BAFTA winning programme that was described by 247 Magazine as "a mix of Skins and Heroes". He plays nervous, shy Simon Bellamy, who gains the superpower of invisibility and precognition in season 3. On 20 December 2011, Rheon announced via Twitter that he had left the show, along with fellow cast member Antonia Thomas.

In 2011, he also appeared in the final episode of Secret Diary of a Call Girl. In 2011, he was nominated for a Golden Nymph in the "Outstanding Actor – Drama Series" category for his role in Misfits. Rheon also made two guest appearances as the character Ben Theodore in Simon Amstell's comedy Grandma's House. In early 2012, Rheon filmed the crime heist drama The Rise. In spring 2012, he began shooting Libertador in Venezuela and Spain. He plays Daniel O'Leary. In May 2012, it was announced that he had signed on to the gritty drama Driven. In 2013, Rheon was cast as the villainous psychopath Ramsay Bolton in the HBO series Game of Thrones. In the DVD commentary for the series' third season, producers David Benioff and D.B. Weiss mentioned that Rheon previously auditioned for the role of Jon Snow, but lost to Kit Harington, with whom Rheon maintains a close friendship. He portrayed Ash Weston in the ITV sitcom Vicious from 2013 until 2016.

In 2013, Rheon played a lead role in the philosophical radio play, Darkside, based on the themes of Pink Floyd's The Dark Side of the Moon album. In September 2014, Rheon joined the cast of BBC One's Our Girl as Dylan "Smurf" Smith. In 2017, it was announced that Rheon had been cast in ABC's Inhumans series. Rheon played Mötley Crüe guitarist Mick Mars in the 2019 film The Dirt. In 2021 he starred in Sky Cinema's 'A Christmas Number One'. In 2023 he filmed the BBC television feature Men Up, about the first clinical trials for the drug Viagra that took place in Swansea in 1994.

=== Music ===
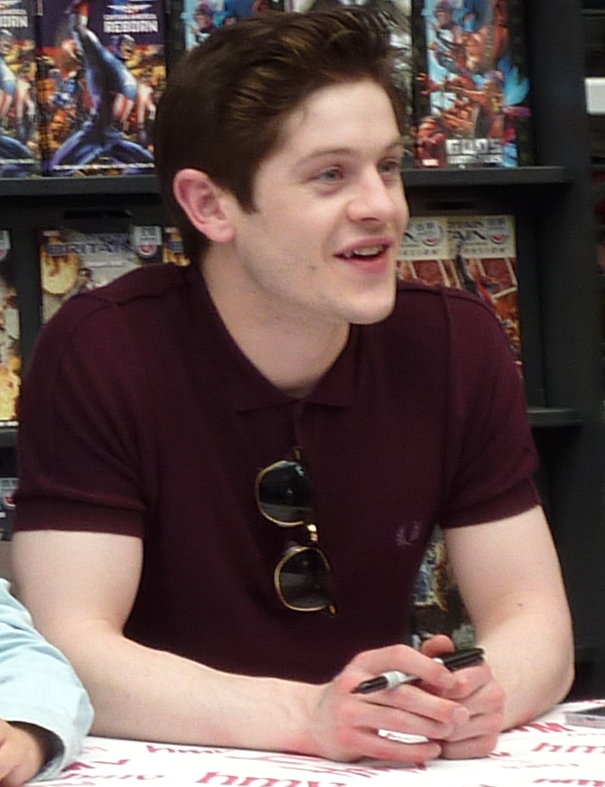
Rheon in 2011

Songwriting and singing since the age of 16, Rheon was lead singer in The Convictions until leaving the band to pursue his acting career. In 2010, he recorded his first solo work, Tongue Tied EP, at RAK Studios in London, produced by Jonathan Quarmby and Kevin Bacon. The EP, a four track release with acoustic guitar and voice, was released digitally in June 2010.

He returned to RAK Studios, in April 2011, to record his second EP Changing Times, again produced by Quarmby and Bacon, with the addition of three backing musicians. Changing Times was released on 10 October 2011. On 7 April 2013, Rheon released his third EP Bang! Bang! and on 9 April 2013, released the music video for the title track.

Rheon recorded his first album, Dinard, at RAK Studios in London and Tŷ Cerdd Studios in Wales. The album was released in April 2015 and produced by James Clarke and Jim Unwin. A "self-funded collection of emotive folk-pop songs recorded over several years", the album's title refers to Dinard, a town in Brittany, France, where Rheon met Zoë Grisedale, who was his girlfriend at the time of the album's release. Music journalist Neil McCormick described the album as "an absorbing collection of moody, introspective songs, all written by Rheon, who plays acoustic guitar with a deft touch and sings in an expressive, gritty voice".

On July 3, 2025, Rheon released his second album. Titled I Just Wish I'd Never Gone To Space, the album is produced by Chris Hyson and features a first single named Forward Motion.

== Personal life ==
Rheon is fluent in both Welsh and English, with Welsh being his first language. He lives in London, and he has a son, born in August 2018, whose mother is Zoë Grisedale. Rheon and Grisedale separated in 2023.

== Filmography ==
=== Film ===
Year	Title	Role	Notes
2011	Resistance	George	
2011	Wild Bill	Pill	
2012	The Rise	Dempsey	known as Wasteland in North America
2012	The Gospel of Us	Himself	Musical performer
2013	Libertador	Daniel O'Leary	
2015	Mermaid's Song	Randall	
2016	Alien Invasion: S.U.M.1	S.U.M.1	
2017	Daisy Winters	Doug	
2018	Hurricane: 303 Squadron	Jan Zumbach	known as Mission of Honor in the U.S.
2019	Berlin, I Love You	Greg	Segment: "Embassy"
2019	The Dirt	Mick Mars	
2021	The Toll	Dom	known as Tollbooth in the U.S.
2021	Barbarians	Adam	
2022	The Magic Flute	Papageno	
2022	Suppression	TBA	
2023	A Christmas No.1	Blake Cutter	
2026	Out There	Lew	

=== Television ===
Year	Title	Role	Notes
2002–2004	Pobol y Cwm	Macsen White	
2006	Caerdydd	Daniel	
2009–2011	Misfits	Simon Bellamy	Main role (series 1–3)
2010	Coming Up	Luka	1 episode
2010–2012	Grandma's House	Ben Theodore	2 episodes
2011	Secret Diary of a Call Girl	Lewis	1 episode
2013–2016	Game of Thrones	Ramsay Bolton	Recurring role (season 3); main role (seasons 4–6)
2013–2016	Vicious	Ash Weston	Main role
2014	Our Girl	Dylan "Smurf" Smith	Main role (series 1)
2014	Under Milk Wood	Evans the Death	1 episode
2015	Residue	Jonas Flak	3 episodes
2016	The Green Hollow	Sam Knight	Television film
2017	Urban Myths	Adolf Hitler	1 episode
2017	Riviera	Adam Clios	Recurring role (series 1)
2017	Inhumans	Maximus	Main role
2017	Family Guy	George Harrison / John Lennon / Ring Announcer	Voice role; episode: "Petey IV"
2019	PTSD: The War in My Head	Narrator	
2020	A Special School	Narrator	
2020	The Snow Spider	The Voice of Gwydion	
2021	American Gods	Liam Doyle	Recurring role (season 3)
2021	The Prince	Prince William	Voice role
2021	A Christmas Number One	Blake Cutter	Television film
2022	The Light in the Hall	Joe Pritchard	known as Y Golau in Welsh
2023	Wolf	Molina	Recurring Role - 6 episodes
2023	Men Up	Meurig Jenkins	Television film
2024	Those About to Die	Tenax	10 episodes
2026	The Rapture	Dick Carwyn	

=== Radio and audiobook ===
Year	Title	Role	Notes
2013	Darkside	The Boy	Radio; voice role
2018	Wizards and Robots	Narrator	Audiobook: prologue
2021	Howl's Moving Castle	Wizard Howl	Radio; voice role
2025/26	Harry Potter: The Full-Cast Audio Editions	Remus Lupin	Audiobook

=== Video games ===
Year	Title	Voice role	Notes
2014–2015	Game of Thrones	Ramsay Snow	Voice role
2021	Total War: Warhammer II	Rakarth	Voice role

== Stage ==
Year	Title	Role	Notes
2008	Eight Miles High	Al	Royal Court Theatre, Liverpool
2009	Spring Awakening	Moritz Stiefel	Lyric Hammersmith
2010	The Devil Inside Him	Huw Prosser	National Theatre Wales
2011	Remembrance Day	Lyosha	Royal Court Theatre
2018	Foxfinder	William Bloor	Ambassadors Theatre

== Discography ==
=== EPs ===
- Tongue Tied EP (2010)
- Changing Times EP (2011)
- Bang, Bang! EP (2013)

=== Studio albums ===
- Dinard (2015)
- I Just wish I'd never gone to space (2025)

== Awards and nominations ==
Year	Award	Category	Work	Result	Ref.
2010	Laurence Olivier Award	Laurence Olivier Award for Best Performance in a Supporting Role in a Musical	Spring Awakening	Won	
2011	Golden Nymph Awards	Outstanding Actor – Drama Series	Misfits	Nominated	
2012	SFX Awards	Best Actor	Misfits	Nominated	
2014	Screen Actors Guild Award	Outstanding Performance by an Ensemble in a Drama Series	Game of Thrones	Nominated	
2015	IGN Awards	Best TV Villain	Game of Thrones	Nominated	
2015	IGN People's Choice Award	Best TV Villain	Game of Thrones	Nominated	
2016	Screen Actors Guild Award	Outstanding Performance by an Ensemble in a Drama Series	Game of Thrones	Nominated	
2020	CinEuphoria Award	Merit – Honorary Award	Game of Thrones	Won	
