= Matthew McNulty =

British actor (born 1982)

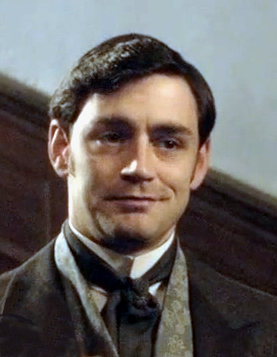
- McNulty in The Paradise (2012)
- Born: Michael Anthony McNulty; 14 December 1982 (age 43); Hanover, Lower Saxony, West Germany
- Occupation: Actor
- Years active: 2001–present
- Spouse: Katie McNulty
- Children: 3

Michael Anthony McNulty (born 14 December 1982), known professionally as Matthew McNulty, is a German-born British actor. His credits include See No Evil: The Moors Murders (2006), Looking for Eric (2009), The Musketeers (2016), The Terror (2018), Cleaning Up (2019), and Domina (2021), and The Rising (2022).

== Early life ==
McNulty was born on 14 December 1982 in Hanover, Lower Saxony, West Germany, and lived in Berlin and Münster, before moving to Atherton, Greater Manchester, England, when he was 10 years old. He attended Hesketh Fletcher high school, Atherton, then furthered his education at Winstanley College in Wigan. At 15 years of age, he was a lead in a school play, and enjoyed the role enough to make acting a career choice.

McNulty was attending drama classes in Manchester when casting director Judi Hayfield approached him to audition for his first feature film. He juggled working in demolition with performing.

== Career ==
Matthew McNulty gained early recognition for his portrayal of David Smith in the BAFTA-winning true crime drama See No Evil: The Moors Murders (2006), following it with a lead performance in the BAFTA-winning Channel 4 film The Mark of Cain (2007).

In 2009, McNulty played the young Eric in Ken Loach's film Looking for Eric and portrayed Luis Buñuel in Little Ashes. He continued to build his television career with roles in series such as Lark Rise to Candleford (2009–2010), Unforgiven (2009), and Misfits (2010–2012), where he played power dealer Seth.

McNulty's extensive work in period dramas includes performances in Room at the Top (2012), The Paradise (2012), The Mill (2013–2014), Jamaica Inn (2014), The Musketeers (2016), and Versailles (2018). He also appeared in The Terror (2018) and in the final episode of Agatha Christie's Poirot, titled "Curtain: Poirot’s Last Case" (2013), portraying Major Allerton.

In contemporary settings, he starred in the first series of The Syndicate (2012) and played roles in Black Work (2015), Cleaning Up (2019), The Bay (2019), and Deadwater Fell (2020). In 2020, he appeared in the Doctor Who episode "Praxeus" as astronaut Adam Lang.

From 2021 onwards, McNulty has portrayed Gaius, who becomes Emperor Augustus, in the historical drama series Domina. His recent work includes his portrayal of Andy Burnham in Anne (2022), as well as appearances in The Rising (2022), Greatest Days (2023), and The Jetty (2024).

== Filmography ==
=== Film ===
Year	Title	Role	Notes
2005	Love + Hate	Shane	
2007	The Mark of Cain	Shane Gulliver	
2007	Control	Nick Jackson	
2008	A Fox's Tale	Alex (voice)	
2008	Little Ashes	Luis Buñuel	
2009	Vivaldi, the Red Priest	Philippe d'Orléans	
2009	Looking for Eric	Young Eric	
2009	Messengers 2: The Scarecrow	Deputy Sheriff Milton	Video
2009	Beware the Kids	Mark	
2010	Geography of the Hapless Heart	Jamie	
2010	The Arbor	Andrew Dunbar	
2011	The Disappearance of Jennifer Pope	Stefan Pope	
2012	The Knot	Jeremy	
2012	Spike Island	Ibiza Steve Titchfield	
2012	Wartime Wanderers	Ray Westwood	
2015	Sweat	Jamie	Short film
2015	The Mark	Dean Ellis	
2017	Bound	Matt	
2020	Running Naked	Mark Doherty	
2023	Greatest Days	Passport Checker Stuart	
2025	Underground	Brother John	Video
2026	Harvest	Johan	

=== Television ===
Year	Title	Role	Notes
2001	Emmerdale	Dominic Skelton	1 episode
2002	An Angel for May	Sniffer	Television film
2002	Birthday Girl	Justin	Television film
2003	Sweet Medicine	Sam	Episode: #1.7
2004	D-Day: The Ultimate Conflict	Don Burgess	Television documentary film
2004	Outlaws	Dwayne Alsop	Episode: "The Decline of English Murder"
2006	Shameless	Tough Lad (Trev)	Episode: "Dark Friends"
2006	Doctors	Pez Green	Episode: "Confidence"
2006	See No Evil: The Moors Murders	David Smith	Mini-series; 3 episodes
2007	Holby City	Rob Gibson	Episodes: "Can't Buy Me Love" & "The Borders of Sleep"
2007	True Dare Kiss	Arlo	Episodes: #1.2 & #1.4
2007	The Royal	Stan	Series 6; 3 episodes
2008	Honest	Vincent 'Vin' Carter / Taylor Carter	6 episodes
2008	The Shooting of Thomas Hurndall	Tom Hurndall	Television documentary film
2009	Unforgiven	Steve Whelan	Mini-series; 3 episodes
2009	Inspector George Gently	Harry Carson	Episode: "Gently with the Innocents"
2009	Cranford	Edward Bell	Episodes: "Return to Cranfoed: Parts One & Two"
2009–2010	Lark Rise to Candleford	Fisher Bloom	Recurring role; 5 episodes
2010	Five Days	Danny Preston	Series 2; 5 episodes
2010	Law & Order: UK	Joe Nash / Billy Wells	Episode: "ID"
2010	Garrow's Law	David Jasker	Episode: #2.2
2010	Single-Handed	Brian Doyle	Series 4; 6 episodes
2010	Toast	Josh	Television film
2010–2012	Misfits	Seth	Recurring role; 11 episodes
2011	Silent Witness	Sergeant Craig Whitehead	Episodes: "The Prodigal: Parts 1 & 2"
2012	The Syndicate	Stuart Bradley	Series 1; 5 episodes
2012	Silk	Captain Ed Ryan	Episode: "The House of Ill Repute"
2012	Room at the Top	Joe Lampton	Mini-series; 2 episodes
2012–2013	The Paradise	Dudley	Series 1 & 2; 16 episodes
2012–2014	CBeebies Bedtime Stories	Himself - Storyteller	5 episodes
2013	Our Girl	Corporal Geddings	Television film (pilot episode for the series)
2013	Agatha Christie's Poirot	Major Allerton	Episode: "Curtain: Poirot's Last Case"
2013–2014	The Mill	Daniel Bate	Series 1 & 2; 10 episodes
2014	Jamaica Inn	Jem Merlyn	Mini-series; 3 episodes
2014	The Great War: The People's Story	Alan Lloyd	Mini-series; 2 episodes
2015	Black Work	DC Jack Clark	Mini-series; 3 episodes
2016	The Musketeers	Lucien Grimaud	Series 3; 10 episodes
2017	Stan Lee's Lucky Man	Rob Spencer	Episode: "Playing with Fire"
2018	The Terror	Lt. Edward Little	Series 1; 9 episodes
2018	Versailles	Guillaume	Series 3; 9 episodes
2019	Cleaning Up	Dave	6 episodes
2019	Do Not Disturb	Pete	Episode: "Child's Play"
2019	The Bay	Nicholas Mooney	Series 1; 6 episodes
2020	Deadwater Fell	PS Steve Campbell	Mini-series; 4 episodes
2020	Doctor Who	Adam Lang	Episode: "Praxeus"
2021, 2023	Domina	Gaius	Main role. Series 1 & 2; 14 episodes
2022	Anne	Andy Burnham	Mini-series; 2 episodes
2022	The Rising	Tom Rees	8 episodes
2024	The Jetty	Arj	Mini-series; 4 episodes
2026	After the Flood	Xav Palmer	Series 2; 5 episodes
2026	Adultery	Neil Brookes	6 episodes
