= Nathan Stewart-Jarrett =

English film, television, and theatre actor

- Stewart-Jarrett in 2026
- Born: Nathan Lloyd Stewart-Jarrett; London, England
- Education: Central School of Speech and Drama
- Occupation: Actor
- Years active: 2007–present

Nathan Lloyd Stewart-Jarrett is an English actor. He starred as Curtis Donovan in the E4 series Misfits (2009–2012) and Ian in the Channel 4 series Utopia (2013–2014). He is also known for his theatre work, earning a WhatsOnStage Award nomination for his performance in Angels in America. His films include The Comedian (2012), War Book (2014), Mope (2019), Candyman (2021), and Femme (2023), for which he won a British Independent Film Award.

== Early life and education ==
Nathan Lloyd Stewart-Jarrett was born in Wandsworth, South London.

He attended the BRIT School, then went on to train at the Royal Central School of Speech and Drama.

== Career ==
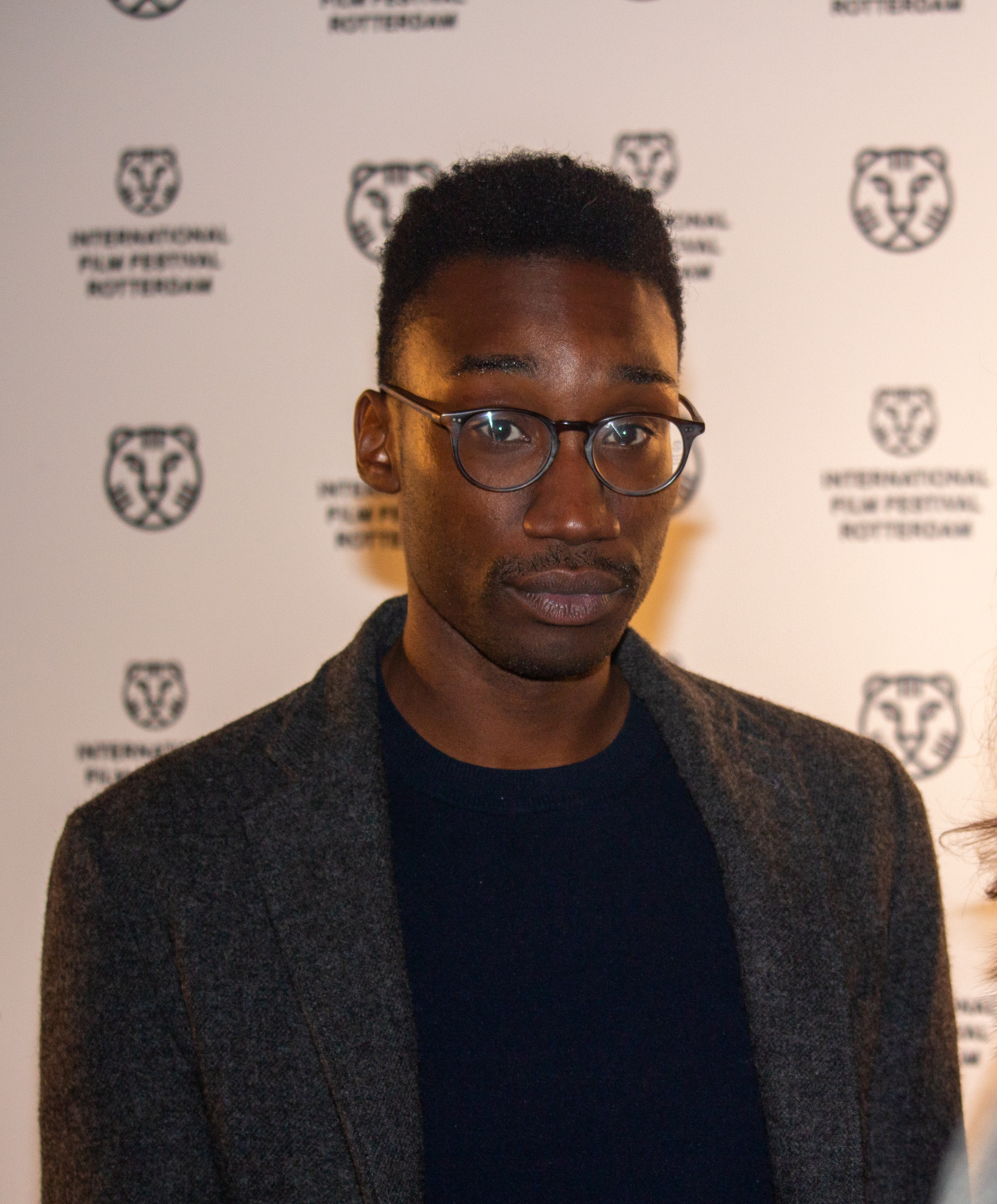
Stewart-Jarrett in 2015

Stewart-Jarrett made his professional stage debut with a number of roles in Brixton Stories at the Lyric, Hammersmith, and was in the fourth cast of The History Boys at the National Theatre.

From 2009 to 2012, Stewart starred in the E4 series Misfits as Curtis Donovan, a role he played for the first four series, making him Misfits' longest running cast member and the last remaining original cast member until he was written out during the fourth series. In 2012, he appeared in the revival of Pitchfork Disney at the Arcola Theatre.

The year after leaving Misfits, Jarrett began starring as Ian Johnson in the Channel 4 conspiracy thriller series Utopia and made his feature film debut in the crime comedy Dom Hemingway. He also appeared in a music video by Years&Years called "Real" released in 2014.

Stewart-Jarrett played the drag queen Belize, Prior Walter's (Andrew Garfield) friend, in the 2017 National Theatre production of Tony Kushner's Angels in America directed by Marianne Elliott, for which Stewart-Jarrett was nominated for the WhatsOnStage Award for Best Supporting Actor in a Play. He made his Broadway debut when the show transferred to the Neil Simon Theatre in 2018.

In 2019, Stewart-Jarrett portrayed actor Steve Driver in the biographical film Mope and Johnny Edgecombe in the BBC One miniseries The Trial of Christine Keeler. He also had a recurring role in Four Weddings and a Funeral on Hulu and a small role in the family film The Kid Who Would Be King. This was followed in 2020 by roles in the film The Argument and the BBC series Dracula.

In 2021, Stewart-Jarrett made a guest appearance in the Doctor Who special "Revolution of the Daleks", starred as Troy Cartwright in the Candyman sequel, and had a main role as guidance counsellor Sam in the HBO Max teen comedy-drama Generation (stylised as Genera+ion).

Stewart-Jarrett stars opposite George MacKay in the thriller film Femme, which premiered at the 73rd Berlinale in 2023. and has a leading role in the Star (Disney+) heist series Culprits.

In September 2025, Stewart-Jarrett stars as Jack Worthing in the National Theatre's production Oscar Wilde's The Importance of Being Earnest at the Noël Coward Theatre.

== Acting credits ==
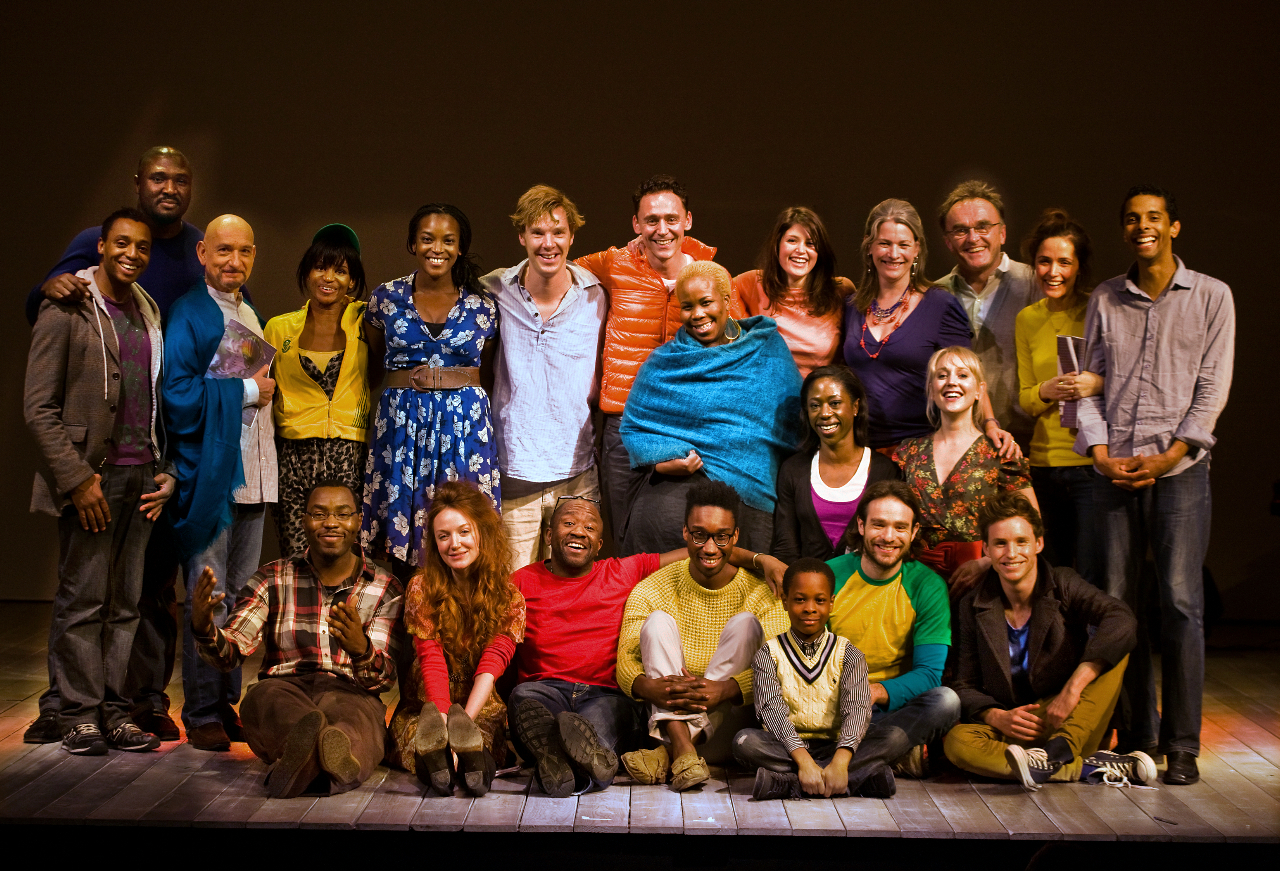
Stewart-Jarrett (bottom row, fourth from the left) as part of The Children's Monologues cast, 2010

=== Film ===
Year	Title	Role	Notes
2012	The Comedian		
2013	Dom Hemingway	Hugh	
2014	War Book	Austin	
2018	Vita and Virginia	Ralph Partridge	
2018	Benjamin	Paul	
2019	The Kid Who Would Be King	Mr. Kepler	
2019	Mope	Steve Driver	
2020	The Argument	Actor Paul	
2021	Candyman	Troy Cartwright	
2023	Femme	Jules	
2024	Azrael	Kenan	
TBA	Fonda		Filming

=== Television ===
Year	Title	Role	Notes
2007, 2010	Casualty	Tunde / Luke Whitby	2 episodes
2009	Coming Up	Sam	Episode: "Apples and Oranges"
2009	The Bill	Georgie	Episode: "Long Gone"
2009–2012	Misfits	Curtis Donovan	25 episodes
2010	Money	Felix	2 episodes
2013	The Paradise	Christian Cartwright	Episode: "Episode #2.7"
2013–2014	Utopia	Ian Johnson	12 episodes
2015	Prey	DC Richard Iddon	3 episodes
2016	Houdini and Doyle	Elias Downey	Episode: "In Manus Dei"
2017	Famous in Love	Barrett Hopper	Recurring role
2019	Four Weddings and a Funeral	Tony	Recurring role
2019–2020	The Trial of Christine Keeler	Johnny Edgecombe	Recurring role
2020	Dracula	Adisa	Episode: "Blood Vessel"
2020	Soulmates	Jonah	Episode: "Layover"
2021	Doctor Who	Leo Rugazzi	Episode: "Revolution of the Daleks"
2021	Generation	Sam	Main role
2023	Culprits	Joe	Main role
2024	Black Doves	Zach	3 Episodes
2025	Down Cemetery Road	Downey	

=== Theatre ===
Year	Title	Role	Notes
2006	Brixton Stories	Wordmonger	Lyric Hammersmith, London; professional theatre debut
2007	The Little Foxes	Cal	Perth Theatre, Scotland
2007	Big White Fog	Older Phil/Count Cotton	Almeida Theatre, London
2007–2008	The History Boys	Crowther	Wyndham's Theatre, West End debut
2008	Wig Out!	Wilson	Royal Court Theatre, West End
2009	The Tin Horizon	Saul	Theatre503, London
2010	The Children's Monologues		Old Vic Theatre, London
2012	The Pitchfork Disney	Cosmo Disney	Arcola Theatre, Off West End
2017	Angels in America	Belize	National Theatre – Lyttelton, London
2018	Angels in America	Belize	Neil Simon Theatre, Broadway debut; transfer of the National Theatre production
2025	The Importance of Being Earnest	Jack Worthing	Noël Coward Theatre, West End; transfer of the National Theatre production

=== Radio ===
- Anansi Boys (2017), as Spider (6 episodes)

== Awards and nominations ==
Year	Award	Category	Work	Result	Ref.
2011	Monte-Carlo Television Festival	Outstanding Actor – Drama Series	Misfits	Nominated	
2018	WhatsOnStage Awards	Best Supporting Actor in a Play	Angels in America	Nominated	
2019	FEARnyc	Best Actor	Mope	Won	
2020	Newport Beach Film Festival	Brit to Watch		Won	
2023	British Independent Film Awards	Best Joint Lead Performance	Femme	Won	(Note: Shared with George MacKay.)

== See also ==
- List of British actors
