= Antonia Thomas =

British actress (born 1986)

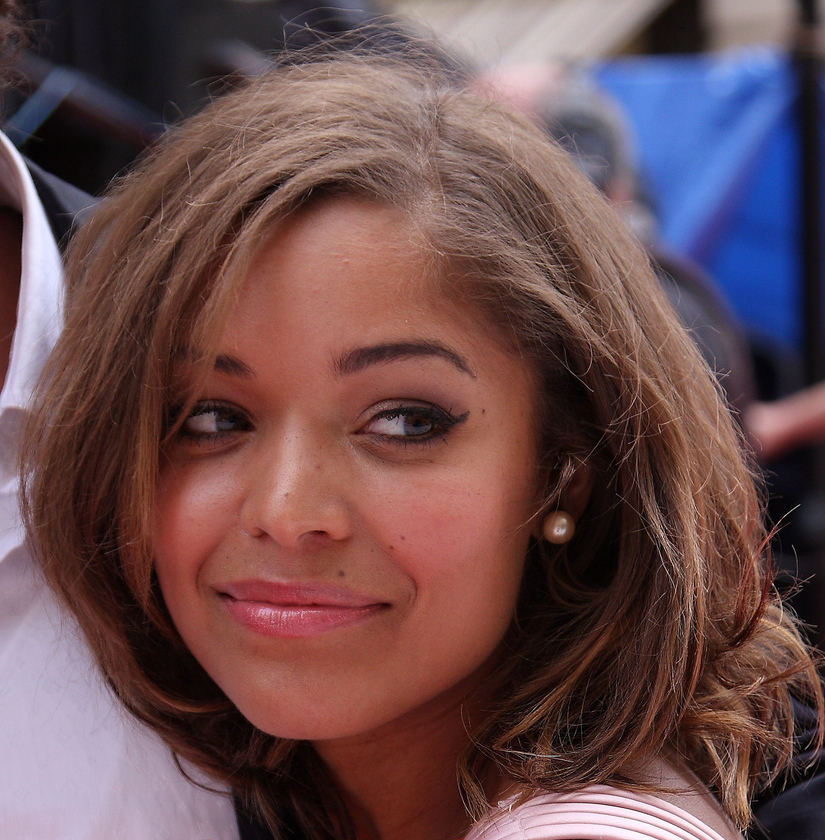
- Thomas in June 2010
- Born: Antonia Laura Thomas; 3 November 1986 (age 40); London, England
- Education: Bristol Old Vic Theatre School (BA); National Youth Theatre
- Occupation: Actress
- Years active: 2009–present
- Height: 5 ft 1 in (1.55 m)

Antonia Laura Thomas (born 3 November 1986) is a British actress. She is best known for her roles as Alisha Daniels in the E4 comedy-drama series Misfits, Evie Douglas in the Channel 4/Netflix comedy series Lovesick and Claire Browne in the ABC drama series The Good Doctor.

== Early life and education ==
Antonia Laura Thomas was born in London in 1986, the daughter of a Jamaican mother, Veronica Thomas, an NHS psychologist, and David Thomas, a classical music singer. She has two older sisters. At age 12, she joined the National Youth Music Theatre, and at age 13 she toured Japan in the musical Pendragon production, alongside Connie Fisher. She attended the Bristol Old Vic Theatre School, graduating in 2009 with a BA in acting, then joined the National Youth Theatre.

== Career ==
Thomas was cast as Alisha Daniels in Misfits in 2009, one day after leaving Bristol Old Vic Theatre School. She confirmed her exit from Misfits in late 2011, stating that she had an "amazing time" on the show. In 2012, she appeared in the music video for the Coldplay song "Charlie Brown".

In 2013, Thomas was in the film Sunshine on Leith, alongside Peter Mullan.

In 2014, she played the role of Evie in the British rom-com TV show Lovesick which aired on Channel 4, then Netflix, for a second series.

In 2015, Thomas was featured in the music video for the Stereophonics' song "C'est La Vie" and narrated the opening and closing lines to the revival of the British children's television series Teletubbies.

In 2017, she began appearing as Claire Browne in the American medical drama The Good Doctor. She left at the end of the fourth season, returning as a guest star for seasons 5 and 7.

As of 2026, she stars in the lead role of Tuppence in the mystery series Agatha Christie's Tommy & Tuppence.

== Filmography ==
=== Short film ===
Year	Title	Role	Notes
2011	Misfits: Erazer	Alisha Daniels	
2013	Air	Alex	
2015	Isla Traena	D	
2016	Breaking	Anna	
2016	The Works	Juliet	
2017	Homer	Lexi	
2020	Freedoms Name Is Mighty Sweet	Lucille Hunter	Co-writer, executive producer
2024	Carry The Wind	Miriam	
2024	Crooked Plow	Storyteller	Except for International Booker Prize
2025	Scope	Antonia	Winner of Best Thriller at Aesthetica Short Film Festival 2025

=== Film ===
Year	Title	Role	Notes
2012	Eight Minutes Idle	Adrienne	
2012	Spike Island	Lisa	
2013	Sunshine on Leith	Yvonne	
2013	Hello Carter	Mischa	
2014	Northern Soul	Angela	
2014	The Hybrid	Steinmann	
2015	Survivor	Naomi Rosenbaum	
2016	FirstBorn	Charlie	
2017	Rearview	Nicky	
2021	All on a Summer's Day	Nicky	
2022	Anacoreta	Antonia	Also producer
2024	Bagman	Karina	
2026	Preschool	Sarah	
TBA	The Scurry	TBA	

=== Television ===
Year	Title	Role	Notes
2009–2011	Misfits	Alisha Daniels	Main role; Series 1–3; 21 Episodes
2010	Stanley Park	Sadie	Television film
2010	The Deep	Maddy	3 Episodes
2012	Homefront	Tasha Raveley	TV Mini-series; 6 Episodes
2014	Fleming	Jazz Singer	2 Episodes
2014	Transporter: The Series	Ferrara	Episode: "The Diva"
2014–2018	Lovesick	Evelyn "Evie" Douglas	Main role; 22 Episodes
2015	The Musketeers	Samara	2 episodes
2015	The Ark	Sabba	Television film
2015–2018	Teletubbies	Narrator/Voice Trumpet (Voice)	120 episodes
2016	The Nightmare Worlds of H. G. Wells	Isabel Harringay	Episode: "The Devotee of Art"
2017–2022, 2024	The Good Doctor	Claire Browne	Main role (seasons 1–4,), guest (season 5 & 7); 80 episodes
2018	Snatches: Moments from Women's Lives	Leonie	Episode: "Tipping Point"
2020	Small Axe	Gretl Logan	Episode: "Red, White and Blue"
2022	The Wonderful World of Mickey Mouse	Narrator (voice)	Episode: "The Wonderful Winter of Mickey Mouse
2022	Suspect	Maia	8 Episodes
2022	Tuca & Bertie	(Voice)	Episode: "Somebirdy's Getting Married"
2023	Still Up	Lisa	Main role
2026	Two Weeks in August	Jess	Main role
2026	Agatha Christie's Tommy & Tuppence	Tuppence	Lead role
2026	Dig	Clare	Main role; upcoming series

=== Music videos ===
Year	Title	Artist(s)	Director(s)	Ref.
2012	"Charlie Brown"	Coldplay	Mat Whitecross and Mark Rowbotham	
2015	"C'est La Vie"	Stereophonics	Kelly Jones	

=== Stage ===
Year	Title	Role	Venue
2023	Shooting Hedda Gabler	Hedda	Rose Theatre
