= Nathaniel Martello-White =

British actor

- Born: Crouch End, London, England
- Occupations: Actor; writer
- Years active: 1996–present
- Known for: Pretty Little Liars; Hand Of God; New Girl; Daddy's Head

Nathaniel Martello-White is a British actor and writer. Having appeared in several productions of the National Youth Theatre, he graduated from RADA in 2006 and since has performed in films, television shows and theatre.

His film credits include Deadmeat (2007), The Sisterhood of the Traveling Pants 2 (2008), Red Tails, Hard Boiled Sweets and Life Just Is (all 2012). He has also appeared in the television series Doctors, Trial & Retribution, Party Animals, Mongrels, Law & Order: UK, Misfits, Death in Paradise, Silk, Horrible Histories and Collateral. In 2020, he portrayed Rhodan Gordon in Mangrove, part of Steve McQueen's Small Axe series.

His theatre credits include Edward II and Romeo and Juliet at the National Theatre, A Midsummer Night's Dream and Marat/Sade with the Royal Shakespeare Company, and Joe Turner's Come and Gone at the Young Vic; he also appeared in People, Places and Things (2015) at the National Theatre, reprising his role when the production transferred to the Wyndham's Theatre in March 2016.

He is also a writer and has written an anthology of poetry entitled A Western Nightmare. In October 2012 his play Blackta was premièred at the Young Vic.

In 2024, Martello-White had a main role in the British horror film Daddy's Head along with Scottish actress Julia Brown.
