= Alison O'Donnell =

Alison O'Donnell may refer to:

- Alison O'Donnell (actor), Scottish actor
- Alison O'Donnell (musician), Irish musician and singer
