= A Christmas Star =

- Directed by: Richard Mark Elson
- Written by: Maire Campbell; Richard Mark Elson
- Produced by: Joan Burney Keatings
- Starring: Robert James-Collier; Bronagh Waugh; Richard Clements; Pierce Brosnan; Liam Neeson
- Cinematography: Richard C. Bell; Ian Fox
- Edited by: Helen Sheridan
- Music by: Marita McBride; Orla O'Rourke
- Production company: Cinemagic
- Distributed by: ITN Distribution; Signature Entertainment; Entertainment One Films
- Release date: 29 December 2015 (United States)
- Running time: 82 minutes
- Country: United Kingdom
- Language: English

A Christmas Star is a 2015 British Christmas film featuring Pierce Brosnan and Liam Neeson.

== Plot ==
Born in dramatic circumstances under the Christmas Star, Noelle believes she has the gift to perform strange miracles.

A businessman, originally from the Irish town of Pottersglen, returns to try to exploit the townspeople. Noelle uses the power of positivity and love to save the snow globe factory and the town.

== Cast ==
- Robert James-Collier as Pat McKerrod
- Suranne Jones as Miss Darcy
- Bronagh Waugh as Maria O'Hanlon
- Richard Clements as Joe O'Hanlon
- Erin Galway-Kendrick as Noelle O'Hanlon
- Pierce Brosnan as Mr. Shepherd
- Liam Neeson as narrator/Radio DJ
- Julian Fellowes as himself
- Kylie Minogue as herself

== Reception ==
On review aggregator Rotten Tomatoes, the film holds an approval rating of 38% based on 8 reviews, with an average rating of 4.25/10. Grace Montgomery of Common Sense Media awarded A Christmas Star two stars out of five. Trevor Johnston of Time Out gave A Christmas Star one star out of five. Leslie Felperin of The Guardian awarded the film three stars out of five. James Luxford of Radio Times gave the film three stars out of five. Tara Brady of The Irish Times awarded it three stars out of five.

== See also ==
- List of Christmas films
