= Daddy's Head =

2024 film directed by Benjamin Barfoot

- Promotional release poster
- Directed by: Benjamin Barfoot
- Written by: Benjamin Barfoot
- Produced by: Patrick Tolan; Matthew James Wilkinson
- Starring: Rupert Turnbull; Julia Brown; Charles Aitken
- Cinematography: Miles Ridgway
- Production companies: Stigma Films; Arthrofilm; Capture; Onsight; Quickfire Films; Shout Loud Creative
- Distributed by: Shudder; Exponenta Film; Front Row Filmed Entertainment
- Release dates: 22 September 2024 (Fantastic Fest); 11 October 2024 (Shudder)
- Running time: 97 minutes
- Country: United Kingdom
- Language: English

Daddy's Head is a 2024 British horror film directed by Benjamin Barfoot starring Rupert Turnbull, Julia Brown and Charles Aitken. Its plot follows Isaac (Turnbull) and his stepmother Laura (Brown) who are haunted by a strange creature that starts walking around the house after the funeral of his father James (Aitken).

== Plot ==
A young boy named Isaac and his stepmother Laura grieve after his father James' sudden death in a car accident. While discussing James' will, social worker Mary informs Laura that Isaac will likely be sent to a foster home if she chooses not to assume legal guardianship over him. Laura falls asleep while watching home videos of James, and awakens to flashing blue lights and a man's silhouette outside the living room window.

Family friend Robert attempts to help Isaac through his grief as Laura has struggled to connect with him since she married James. Laura is again awoken by the lights and she leaves to investigate. In the woods, Laura finds a destroyed car and hears James' voice calling her name from behind. She turns around, seeing his heavily disfigured face.

The evening after James' funeral, family dog Bella begins to aggressively bark at and chase a creature who escapes through Isaac's bedroom window. A rattled Isaac sleeps in Laura's room that night. Deep in the woods, a creature forming humanoid features growls Isaac's name. Isaac is awoken by the creature, now appearing with James' face, repeating his name. He believes it to be his father, asking for it not to go.

While outside, Isaac again sees the creature, affirming his belief that his father has returned. Mary speaks to Isaac, who is adamant that he saw James. While Laura and Isaac are in the woods, the two encounter a wooden structure modeled after one of James' architectural designs. Isaac claims James built it for him and attempts to enter, but Laura drags him away.

That evening, Laura informs Robert of her fears of raising Isaac, whose behavior has grown erratic and violent. Robert offers to take in Isaac but Laura declines. Laura places a secret camera in Isaac's room. Bella runs back to the wooden structure and is killed by the creature. A veterinarian tells Laura that Bella's wounds could not have been inflicted by another animal, and Laura becomes suspicious that Isaac killed her. Robert and Laura go to James' grave and find it vandalized.

The creature appears in a vent in Isaac's room and asks him to return to the structure. Laura sees the creature on camera and she and Robert enter the room, but the creature leaves. A distressed Laura is comforted by Robert and Isaac witnesses the two kiss. An enraged Isaac returns to the structure and the creature requests that he bring Robert. The following morning, Isaac leads Robert to the structure where the creature attacks Robert leaving him hospitalized and unresponsive.

Laura confronts Isaac, who admits to destroying James' grave but denies killing Bella and attacking Robert. Laura tells Isaac that she is permanently leaving the next day, as she cannot provide the help that he needs. That night, Laura goes to Isaac's room, where she sees the creature lying on Isaac. The creature slams the door in her face, dazing her. A terrified Isaac wakes up and begins screaming. Laura makes her way back into the room and violently stabs the creature with a kitchen knife, but it escapes. Isaac screams Laura's name as she stares in disbelief.

Years later, an older Isaac returns to his childhood home. In the woods, he finds the structure rotten and collapsed. He enters the structure and finds the photo of James the creature used to copy. On the floor, he finds the creature's skeleton, with its skull having no face. Isaac returns home to Laura, whom he now calls "mum".

== Cast ==
- Rupert Turnbull as Isaac
- Julia Brown as Laura
- Charles Aitken as James
- Nathaniel Martello-White as Robert
- Mary Woodvine as Mary
- Nila Aalia as Heather
- Matthew Allen as The Creature
- Lexi Austin-Jones as Alex
- Delta as Bella
- Lucy Doyle as Dr. Alice Way
- Phillipa Flynn as Louise
- Stella Gonet as Ava
- Kaisa Hammarlund as Miranda
- Alice Handoll as Bridgette
- James Harper-Jones as Older Isaac
- Deepica Stephen as Saanvi

== Production ==
During the process of creating the script Benjamin Barfoot had in mind the films Alien, Under the Skin, The Exorcist and video artist Chris Cunningham. He also used as a basis the diagnosis of trauma following his parents' childhood divorce.

Barfoot decided to choose this title for the film because he liked how "bit punky" and "kind of weird" it sounded, but thought about changing it after actress Julia Brown and others questioned whether it had sexual connotations. Something similar was also asked in relation to the film poster that he also helped create, to which Barfoot responded: "I’d like to think you go (...) Is this a fetish porn movie?'"

== Release ==
Shudder announced the acquisition of distribution rights in early August 2024.

It premiered at Fantastic Fest on September 22, 2024, and was released on Shudder on October 11.

== Reception ==
On the review aggregator website Rotten Tomatoes, 84% of 37 critics' reviews are positive. The website's consensus reads: "Daddy's Head is a chilling and atmospheric slice of psychological horror, delivering unsettling imagery and a tense, unpredictable build-up." Metacritic, which uses a weighted average, assigned the film a score of 69 out of 100, based on four critics, indicating "generally favorable" reviews.

Brian Tallerico of RogerEbert.com gave the film 3/4 stars, noting its similarities to The Babadook and Under the Skin. He wrote, "it all works primarily because of Barfoot's oversight of the film's sharp technical elements, including fantastic production design, cinematography, and editing." The Guardian's Phil Hoad gave it 3/5 stars, writing, "A monster, or the supernatural, as a manifestation of uncontainable emotions is hardly a new idea, especially as so-called elevated horror has leaned into the concept... Daddy's Head adopts this increasingly familiar tactic, and just about succeeds in freshening it up with a superlative creature and great production design."

Alison Foreman of IndieWire gave it a B grade, saying it "isn’t likely to stick around as a film that genre fans will revisit often, but as far as haunting and half-baked ghost stories, Shudder subscribers could do worse than this sort-of-good-sort-of-bad pain in the neck."

== See also ==
- List of British films of 2024
- List of horror films of 2024
