= Richard Mark Elson =

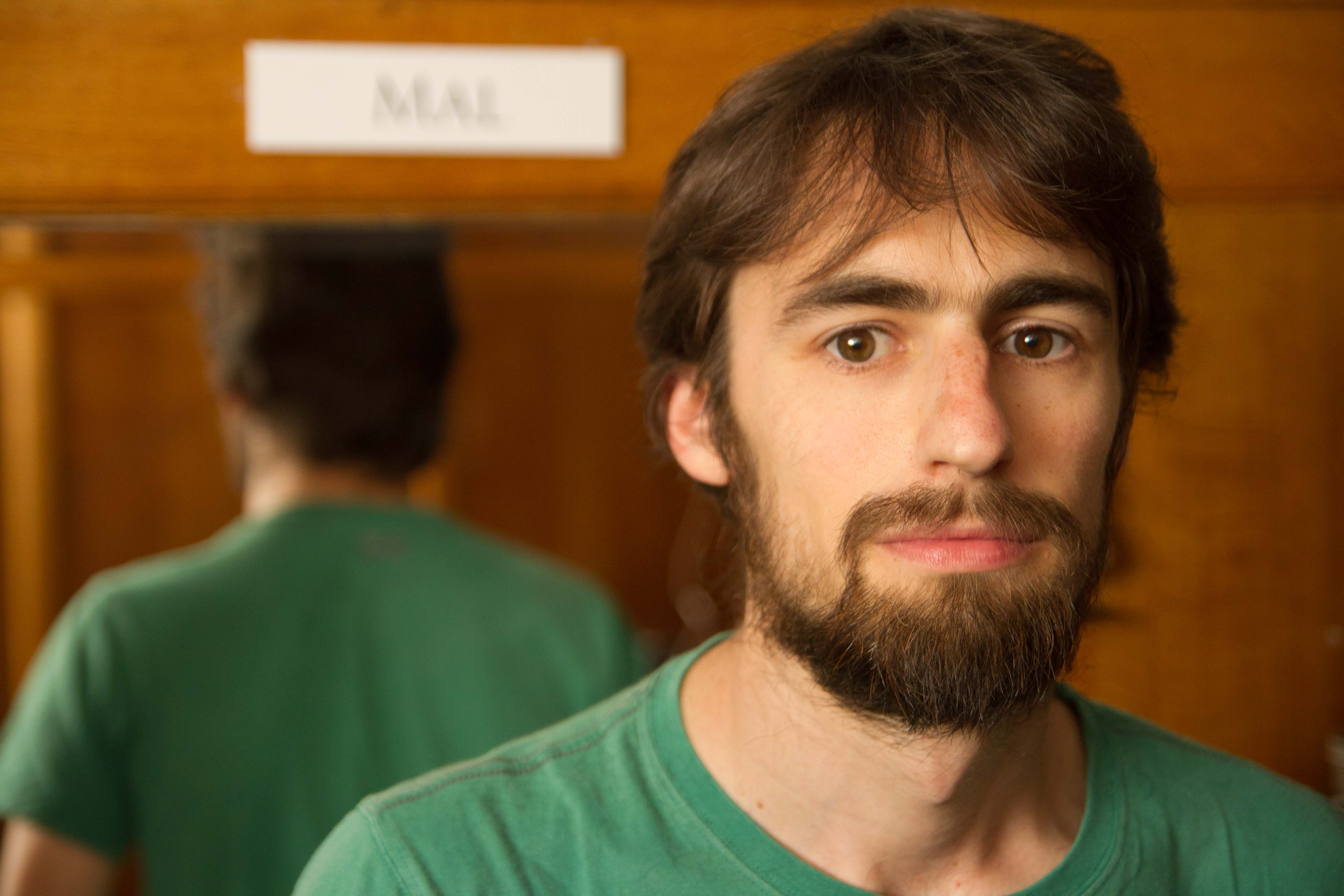
- Richard Mark Elson
- Born: Richard Mark Elson
- Occupation: Director
- Notable work: A Christmas Star, Walking, 78 Breaths
- Television: M.I.High, Shadow Trade

Richard Mark Elson is a UK based director for film and television.

== Career ==
Elson has directed drama, documentary and theatre.

In 2014 he directed the feature film A Christmas Star, Ireland and Northern Ireland's first Christmas children's film, for Cinemagic. The film was nominated for an RTS award and featured Pierce Brosnan, Liam Neeson, Kylie Minogue, Bronagh Waugh, Rob James-Collier and Suranne Jones.

In 2001 he set up film production company Barebone Films which produced several award-winning short films and historical dramas including the 'I Love' series (commissioned by Filmaka which won a Filmaka and LoveFilm award in 2008).

Elson's other directing credits include the popular children's TV series M.I. High for the BBC, the award-winning documentary 'Shadow Trade' and the award-winning play 'Walking'.
