= Julia Brown (actress) =

Scottish actress and singer (born 1997)

- Born: 14 March 1997 (age 29); Edinburgh, Scotland
- Occupations: Actor, singer
- Years active: 2013–present

Julia Brown (born 14 March 1997) is a Scottish actress and singer. She stars as Lois Bennett in the BBC series World on Fire (2019–2023) and as Laura in Daddy's Head. She also appeared in the CBBC series M.I. High (2014) and the crime drama Shetland (2018–2021).

== Early life and education ==
Brown is from Edinburgh. She participated in school plays and local theatre productions as a part of the MGA Academy of Performing Arts.

== Career ==
Brown was 16 when she auditioned for M.I. High on CBBC, making her television debut and joining the main cast as Keri Summers for its seventh and final series. She was subsequently signed by Ruth Young at United Agents; she is also represented by Model Team. Brown had a recurring role as Molly Kilmuir in the fourth and sixth series of the BBC One crime drama Shetland. She also had a role as Ecgwynn in the third and fourth series of the Netflix medieval drama The Last Kingdom.

In 2018, it was announced Brown would star as Lois Bennett in Peter Bowker's World War II drama World on Fire, which premiered as a miniseries on BBC One in 2019 before being renewed for a second series. She starred as Katherine Walker in the 2020 television film Anthony by Jimmy McGovern for the BBC.

== Filmography ==
=== Film ===
| Year | Title | Role | Notes |
|---|---|---|---|
| 2018 | Grasslands | Frankie | Short film |
| 2022 | Jessie and the Elf Boy | Jessie | |
| 2024 | Daddy's Head | Laura | |

=== Television ===
| Year | Title | Role | Notes |
|---|---|---|---|
| 2014 | M.I. High | Keri Summers | Main role. Series 7; episodes 1–13 |
| 2015 | Eve | Caz | Series 1; episode 11: "IT Girl" |
| 2018, 2020 | The Last Kingdom | Ecgwynn | Series 3; episode 4, & series 4; episode 2 |
| 2018, 2021 | Shetland | Molly Kilmuir | Recurring role. Series 4; 6 episodes, & series 6; 4 episodes |
| 2019, 2023 | World on Fire | Lois Bennett | Main role. Series 1; 7 episodes, & series 2: 5 episodes) |
| 2019 | The One Show | Herself | |
| 2020 | The Alienist | Abigail | Season 2; episodes 2 & 4 |
| 2020 | Anthony | Katherine Walker | Television film |
| 2021 | Foundation | Moswen | Season 1; episode 6: "Death and the Maiden" |
| 2021 | Pointless Celebrities | Herself | Episode: "Drama" |
| 2023 | Payback | Manda Willis | Episodes 5 & 6 |
| 2025 | Karen Pirie | Catriona 'Cat' Grant | Series 2; episodes 1–3: "A Darker Domain: Parts 1–3" |
| 2025 | In Flight | Amy McCallum | Channel 4 crime thriller series |

=== Video games ===
| Year | Title | Role |
|---|---|---|
| 2023 | Fort Solis | Jessica Appleton (voice) |

== Theatre ==
| Year | Title | Role | Company | Director |
|---|---|---|---|---|
| 2022 | Footloose | Eleanor Dunbar | Edinburgh Playhouse | |
| | The Philistines | Tatiana | ICATA | Kate Williams |
| | Port | Rachel | ICATA | Bradley Leech |
| 2023 | Little Women | Amy March | HOME Manchester | Brigid Larmour |
| 2024 | The Girls of Slender Means | Selina Redwood | Lyceum Theatre, Edinburgh | Roxana Silbert |
