= Ann Cleeves =

British novelist (born 1954)

Ann Cleeves OBE
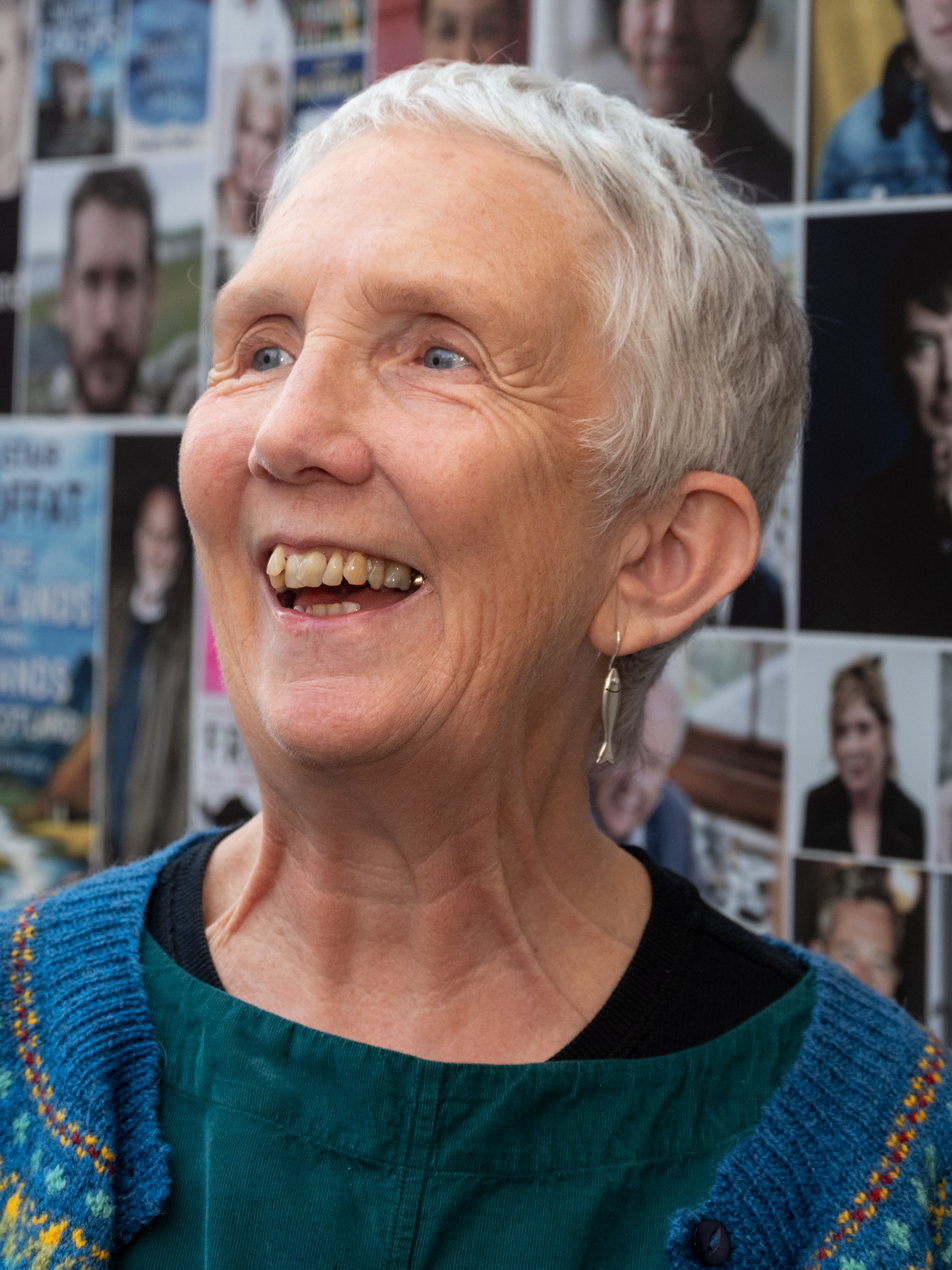
- Cleeves in 2024
- Born: 24 October 1954 (age 72); Herefordshire, England
- Children: 2
- Writing career
- Genre: Crime
- Notable awards: Duncan Lawrie Dagger 2006

Ann Cleeves OBE (born 24 October 1954) is a British mystery crime writer. She wrote the Vera Stanhope, Jimmy Perez, and Matthew Venn series, all three of which have been adapted into TV shows. In 2006, she won the Duncan Lawrie Dagger for her novel Raven Black, the first novel in the Jimmy Perez series.

== Early life and career ==
Cleeves was born in Herefordshire and brought up in north Devon where she attended Barnstaple Grammar School; she studied English at the University of Sussex, but dropped out and then took up various jobs, including cook at the Fair Isle bird observatory, auxiliary coastguard, probation officer, library outreach worker, and child care officer.

== Television adaptations ==
Cleeves's work was first optioned for television after producer Elaine Collins discovered a copy of one of the Vera novels, The Crow Trap, while searching for holiday reading in an Oxfam shop in north London where she lived. Collins was the books executive for ITV Studios, which was looking for a new female detective to fill its Sunday night drama slot. The Vera Stanhope novels have been dramatised as the TV detective series Vera beginning in 2011 with 14 series produced up until 2025. Cleeves has writing credits for Series 13, Episode 1, 'Fast Love' alongside Paul Matthew Thompson. She appeared in the special "Vera... Farewell Pet," which reflected and celebrated the 14 years of the show.

Collins went on to buy the rights to multiple of Cleeves' stories, the Shetland novels for the BBC; and the Two Rivers novels as the TV series The Long Call. Some of the later episodes in the Vera and Shetland series were original scripts based on Cleeves's characters.

== Personal life ==
She lives in Whitley Bay, and she was widowed in December 2018. Her husband was Tim Cleeves, a birdwatcher whose interest in ornithology Ann came to share. She has two daughters.

== Honours, awards, and media appearances ==
In 2006, she won the Duncan Lawrie Dagger for her novel Raven Black, and in 2008 she was elected to the prestigious Detection Club. In 2014, Cleeves was awarded an Honorary Doctorate of Letters by the University of Sunderland. In 2015, Cleeves was the Programming Chair for the Theakstons Old Peculier Crime Writing Festival and the Theakston's Old Peculier Crime Novel of the Year Award. Also in 2015, she was shortlisted for the Dagger in the Library UK Crime Writers' Association award for an author's body of work in British libraries (UK).

Cleeves was chosen as the 2017 recipient of the Cartier Diamond Dagger from the Crime Writers' Association for "sustained excellence" in crime fiction. In February 2019, Cleeves appeared on Desert Island Discs. Cleeves was appointed Officer of the Order of the British Empire (OBE) in the 2022 New Year Honours for services to reading and libraries.

In July 2022, Cleeves was awarded an honorary D.Litt. from Newcastle University for services to reading and libraries.

On 15 September 2024, Cleeves' life was featured in an episode of the BBC Radio 3 series Private Passions.

== Bibliography ==
=== Palmer-Jones ===
- A Bird in the Hand (1986), ISBN 978-0-712-69476-6
- Come Death and High Water (1987), ISBN 978-0-712-61670-6
- Murder in Paradise (1988), ISBN 978-0-712-61965-3
- A Prey to Murder (1989), ISBN 978-0-712-62557-9
- Another Man's Poison (1992), ISBN 978-0-333-58258-9
- Sea Fever (1993), ISBN 978-0-333-60494-6
- The Mill on the Shore (1994), ISBN 978-0-333-61345-0
- High Island Blues (1996), ISBN 978-0-333-66011-9

=== Inspector Ramsay ===
- A Lesson in Dying (1990), ISBN 978-0-712-63415-1
- Murder in My Backyard (1991), ISBN 978-0-712-63830-2
- A Day in the Death of Dorothea Cassidy (1992), ISBN 978-0-333-57093-7
- Killjoy (1993), ISBN 978-0-333-59275-5
- The Healers (1995), ISBN 978-0-333-63724-1
- The Baby Snatcher (1997), ISBN 978-0-333-69179-3

=== Vera Stanhope ===
These novels, except for The Glass Room, have been dramatized in the television series Vera on ITV, which stars Brenda Blethyn in the title role. The programme ran for 14 series from May 2011 until January 2025.

- The Crow Trap (1999), ISBN 978-0-333-76627-9
- Telling Tales (2005), ISBN 978-1-405-04647-3
- Hidden Depths (2007), ISBN 978-1-405-05473-7
- Silent Voices (2011), ISBN 978-0-230-74581-0
- The Glass Room (2012), ISBN 978-0-230-74582-7
- Harbour Street (2014), ISBN 978-0-230-76018-9
- The Moth Catcher (2015), ISBN 978-1-447-27828-3
- The Seagull (2017), ISBN 978-1-447-27834-4
- The Darkest Evening (2020), ISBN 978-1-509-88951-8
- The Rising Tide (2022), ISBN 978-1-509-88961-7
- The Dark Wives (2024), ISBN 978-1-250-83684-7

=== Shetland ===
In 2013, Red Bones was dramatised by David Kane for BBC television as the first episode of the series Shetland, which stars Douglas Henshall as Detective Inspector Jimmy Perez. Episodes broadcast in 2014 were based on Raven Black, Dead Water, and Blue Lightning.

The Four Seasons Quartet

- Raven Black (2006), ISBN 978-1-405-05472-0; Gold Dagger Award
- White Nights (2008), ISBN 978-0-312-38433-3
- Red Bones (2009), ISBN 978-0-230-01446-6
- Blue Lightning (2010), ISBN 978-0-312-38435-7

The Four Elements Quartet

- Dead Water (2013), ISBN 978-0-230-76017-2
- Thin Air (2014), ISBN 978-0-230-76019-6
- Cold Earth (2016), ISBN 978-1-447-27818-4
- Wild Fire (2018), ISBN 978-1-447-27824-5
- Shetland (2015), ISBN 978-1-509-80979-0; a Shetland Island series (non-fiction) travel tie-in preceding Too Good To Be True
- Too Good To Be True (2016), ISBN 978-1-509-80611-9; a Shetland Island series novella following Shetland and preceding Cold Earth

Further Novels

- The Killing Stones (2025), ISBN 978-1-0350-4309-5; Set in the Orkney Islands after the previous books

=== Two Rivers ===
The first book is the adaptive basis for The Long Call ITV series starring Ben Aldridge as DI Matthew Venn.

- The Long Call (2019), ISBN 978-1-509-88956-3
- The Heron's Cry (2021), ISBN 978-1-509-88968-6
- The Raging Storm (2023), ISBN 978-1-529-07769-8
- The Dying Light (2026), ISBN 978-1-5290-7779-7

=== Standalone novels ===
- The Sleeping and the Dead (2001), ISBN 978-0-333-90648-4
- Burial of Ghosts (2003), ISBN 978-1-405-00113-7

Short stories
- "A Winter's Tale" (1992)
- "The Harmless Pursuits of Archibald Stamp" (1995)
- "Sad Girls" (2001)
- "The Plater" (2001)
- "A Rough Guide to Tanga" (2002)
- "Games for Winter" (2003)
- "Owl Wars" (2004)
- "The Midwife's Assistant" (2005)
- "Basic Skills" (2006)
- "Going Back" (2007)
- "The Soothmoothers" (2010)
- "Beastly Pleasures" (2010)
- "Hector's Other Woman" (2011) – (re-released as "The Woman on the Island" in 2022)
- "Mud" (2011)
- "The Habit of Silence" (2011)
- "Drop Dead Gorgeous" (2012)
- "The Harmless Pursuits of Archibald Stamp" (2013)
- "Secrets of Soil" (2013)
- "The Spinster" (2014)
- "The Pirate" (2014)
- "Stranded" (2014)
- "The Writer-in-Residence" (2014)
- "The Starlings" (2015)
- "Dreaming of Rain and Peter Lovesey" (2016)
- "The Queen of Mystery" (2017)
- "The Return" (2017)
- "Moses and the Locked Tent Mystery" (2018)
- "Frozen" (2020)
- "Written in Blood" (2020)
- "Wild Swimming" (2021)
- "The Girls on the Shore" (2022)
- "The Woman on the Island" (2022) – (originally released as "Hector's Other Woman" in 2011)
