= Shetland (TV series) =

BBC Scotland crime drama TV series, 2013–

- Title card (2014-2022)
- Genre: Crime drama
- Created by: Ann Cleeves
- Starring: Douglas Henshall; Alison O'Donnell; Steven Robertson; Lewis Howden; Erin Armstrong; Mark Bonnar; Anne Kidd; Julie Graham; Ashley Jensen; Angus Miller; Steven Miller; Samuel Anderson
- Composer: John Lunn
- Country of origin: Scotland
- Original languages: English, Scots
- No. of series: 11
- No. of episodes: 58

Production
- Executive producers: Christopher Aird; Elaine Collins; Kate Bartlett
- Producers: Sue de Beauvoir; Peter Gallagher; Eric Coulter; Angus Sharpe
- Cinematography: Gavin Struthers; Jean-Philippe Gossart; Tim Palmer; Stijn Van der Veken
- Editors: Joris Brouwers; Melanie Viner-Cuneo; David Fisher; Simon Starling
- Running time: 57 minutes
- Production companies: ITV Studios (2013–2016); Silverprint Pictures (part of ITV Studios) (2018–present)

Original release
- Network: BBC One
- Release: 10 March 2013 – present

Shetland is a British crime drama television series produced by ITV Studios for BBC Scotland. First broadcast on BBC One on 10 March 2013, it is originally based upon the novels of Ann Cleeves and adapted by David Kane. Douglas Henshall starred as DI Jimmy Pérez in the first seven series, while Ashley Jensen portrayed DI Ruth Calder from the eighth series.

Henshall won the 2016 BAFTA Scotland award for Best Actor and the series received the award for Best TV Drama.

The stories take place largely on the eponymous archipelago, although some of the filming takes place on the Scottish mainland. Most, but not all, exterior location filming takes place in Shetland. Interiors may be filmed in either Shetland or in west central Scotland.

Ahead of the show's seventh series, Henshall's departure was announced with Jensen revealed as his replacement. A ninth and tenth series were commissioned in March 2024. Alison O'Donnell will depart following its eleventh series after 13 years in the role. Filming on a twelfth series will begin in 2027.

== Production ==
The first series consists of two episodes, a single two-part story based on the novel Red Bones by Ann Cleeves. This series was broadcast across two nights on 10 and 11 March 2013 and was produced by Sue de Beauvoir. Subsequently, a second series was commissioned by the BBC. Series two was extended to contain six episodes. These were filmed in 2013 and screened in 2014. This series, produced by Peter Gallagher, features three two-part stories based on the novels Raven Black, Dead Water, and Blue Lightning.

Filming began in April 2015 for a third series, which began screening in January 2016. This series saw a change in format, with all six episodes covering a single story written exclusively for television. This was the first series not to adapt any of Cleeves' novels. Ciarán Hinds and Anna Chancellor were among the new cast members for this series. A fourth series was announced by the BBC in July 2016. Again, this series is a single story played out across six episodes and written exclusively for television. Stephen Walters and Neve McIntosh were among the new cast members announced for the series. It was broadcast on BBC One beginning on 13 February 2018. Series 5 was broadcast from 12 February 2019.

During filming, the cast and crew are usually based in Glasgow and other areas of mainland Scotland. Filming often takes place in areas with landscape or buildings reminiscent of those in the Shetland Islands, such as Kilbarchan in Renfrewshire, Barrhead, where Henshall was born and grew up, Ayr and Irvine, North Ayrshire. "My character's house is actually in Kilbarchan, the interior of a couple of crofts are here [in Irvine, Ayrshire] and the police station is in Barrhead," Henshall said in a 2019 interview.

Filming locations on or near Shetland have included Lerwick, the NorthLink ferry, and the village of Wester Quarff, south of Lerwick. Some filming was on Fair Isle for series 2, and the Hillswick wildlife sanctuary featured in series 4.

Shortly before series 7 premiered, Henshall announced that the series would be his last. It was then announced that he would be replaced in the leading role by Ashley Jensen from the eighth series. Filming for series 9 started in Shetland in April 2024, and was broadcast from 6 November to 11 December 2024.

== Cast ==
=== Main cast ===
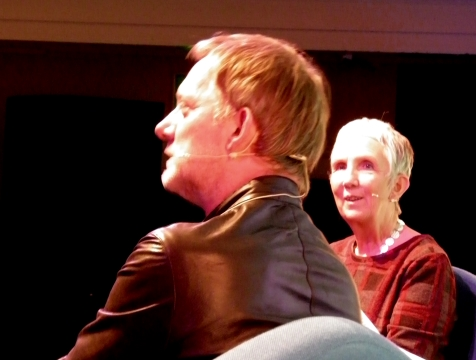
Douglas Henshall and Ann Cleeves at The Bloody Scotland International Crime Writing Festival in 2017

- Douglas Henshall as DI Jimmy Perez (series 1–7)
- Alison O'Donnell as DS (later DI) Alison "Tosh" McIntosh (series 1–11)
- Steven Robertson as PC (later DC) Sandy Wilson (series 1–present)
- Lewis Howden as Sergeant (later PC) Billy McCabe (series 1, 3–present)
- Erin Armstrong as Cassie Perez (series 1–7)
- Mark Bonnar as Duncan Hunter (series 1–7)
- Anne Kidd as Cora McLean, forensic pathologist (series 5–present; recurring series 2–4)
- Julie Graham as Rhona Kelly, procurator fiscal (series 2–5, 7)
- Ashley Jensen as DI Ruth Calder (series 8–present)
- Angus Miller as Donnie Russell (series 9, 11; recurring series 5–8; guest series 10)
- Steven Miller as Reverend Alan Calder (series 9–present; recurring series 8)
- Samuel Anderson as Matt Blake, procurator fiscal (series 11–present; recurring series 10)

=== Recurring cast ===
- Stewart Porter as Billy McBride, police sergeant (series 2)
- Fiona Bell as Donna Killick (series 4, 6)
- Neve McIntosh as Kate Kilmuir (series 4, 6)
- Julia Brown as Molly Kilmuir (series 4, 6)
- Jimmy Chisholm as Alec MacBay (series 4, 6)
- Conor McCarry as PC Alex Grant (series 5–present)
- Anneika Rose as Maggie Kean, procurator fiscal (series 6–7)
- Lucianne McEvoy as Meg Pattison (series 6–7)
- Eubha Akilade as PC Lorna Burns (series 7–present)
- Tibu Fortes as Harry Lamont, procurator fiscal (series 8–9)
- Kevan MacKenzie as James Innes (series 8, 10)

=== Guest cast ===
==== Series 1 ====
Red Bones

- Sandra Voe as Mima Wilson
- Claire Rafferty as Anna Haldane
- Jim Sturgeon as Ronald Haldane
- Gemma Chan as Hattie James
- Lindy Whiteford as Jackie Haldane
- James Greene as Andrew Haldane
- Alexander Morton as Joseph Wilson

==== Series 2 ====
Raven Black

- Rebecca Benson as Sally Henry
- Brian Cox as Magnus Bain

Dead Water

- Nina Sosanya as Willow Reeves
- Alex Norton as Cameron Watt
- David Hayman as Joe Dalhousie

Blue Lightning

- John Lynch as Frank Blake
- Bill Paterson as James Perez

==== Series 3 ====
- Ciarán Hinds as Michael Maguire
- Saskia Reeves as Freya Galdie
- Archie Panjabi as DS Asha Israni
- Anna Chancellor as Phyllis Brenan
- James Cosmo as Arthur MacCall

==== Series 4 ====
- Stephen Walters as Thomas Malone
- Sean McGinley as Drew McColl
- Eleanor Matsuura as DI Jessie Cole

==== Series 5 ====
- Rakie Ayola as Olivia Lennox
- Derek Riddell as Chris Brooks
- Catherine Walker as Alice Brooks
- Titana Muthui as Zezi Ugara
- Kate Dickie as Sam Boyd
- Lorn Macdonald as Jamie Hayes

==== Series 6 ====
- Cora Bissett as Eve Galbraith
- Stephen McCole as Logan Creggan

==== Series 7 ====
- Shauna Macdonald as Rachel Cairns
- Andrew Whipp as Danny Cairns
- Patrick Robinson as Lloyd Anderson
- Laurie Brett as Alison Woods
- Stuart McQuarrie as Murry Rankin

==== Series 8 ====
- Phyllis Logan as Grace Bain
- Dawn Steele as Stella Quinn
- Barry O'Connor as Kieran Quinn
- Don Gilét as John Howell
- Jamie Sives as Cal Innes
- Ann Louise Ross as Agnes Moffat
- Russ Bain as Bobby Bain
- Manjinder Virk as Farida Sadat
- Nina Toussaint-White as Amma Calder

==== Series 9 ====
- Stuart Campbell as Malcolm Kidd
- Sarah MacGillivray as Annie Bett
- Jacob Ferguson as Noah Bett
- Robert Jack as Ian Bett
- Lesley Hart as Noreen Stack
- Andrew John Tait as Michael Stack
- Vincent Regan as John Harris
- Ross Anderson as Patrick Harris
- Macleod Stephen as Fergus Harris
- Ian Hart as Euan Rossi
- Tara Lee as Lisa Friel
- Johannes Lassen as Stefan Jakobson
- Nathalie Merchant as Karin Jakobson
- Ines Asserson as Astrid Jakobson
- Jimmy Yuill as Angus Wallace

==== Series 10 ====
- Greg McHugh as Colin Waite
- Stuart Townsend as Ed Tulloch
- Clive Russell as Arthur Mair
- Ellie Haddington as Lana Mair
- Louise Brealey as Isobel Jameson
- Niall MacGregor as Tom Jameson
- Chloe-Ann Tylor as Stevie Shannon

==== Series 11 ====
- Stella Gonet as Martha Linden
- Christine Bottomley as Emily Linden
- John Wark as Eric Linden
- Gregor Fisher as Donald Pierce
- Kevin Harvey as Graeme Gould
- Gavin Mitchell as Murray Ross

== Episodes ==
=== Overview ===
Series	Episodes	Originally released		Average 7-day UK viewers (millions)
Series	Episodes	First released	Last released	Average 7-day UK viewers (millions)
1	2	10 March 2013	11 March 2013	6.82
2	6	11 March 2014	15 April 2014	5.70
3	6	15 January 2016	4 March 2016	6.33
4	6	13 February 2018	20 March 2018	6.11
5	6	12 February 2019	19 March 2019	6.87
6	6	20 October 2021	24 November 2021	7.28
7	6	10 August 2022	14 September 2022	5.80
8	6	1 November 2023	6 December 2023	5.60
9	6	6 November 2024	11 December 2024	5.25
10	6	5 November 2025	10 December 2025	4.97
11	6	12 November 2026	17 December 2026	TBA

=== Series 1 (2013) ===
The series introduces Douglas Henshall as DI Jimmy Perez and Alison O'Donnell as DS Alison 'Tosh' McIntosh. It is based on the third novel Red Bones by Ann Cleeves.

No. overall	No. in series	Title	Directed by	Written by	Original release date	UK viewers (millions)
1	1	"Red Bones – Part 1"	Peter Hoar	David Kane	10 March 2013	7.97
Elderly Shetlander Mima Wilson is found murdered at her Bressay croft, the site of an ongoing archaeological dig. Detective Inspector Jimmy Pérez and his team investigate, and suspect that the murder is linked to Mima's related Haldane family and the Shetland bus.
2	2	"Red Bones – Part 2"	Peter Hoar	David Kane	11 March 2013	5.68
After the murder of an archeology student at the croft, the supervising professor comes under scrutiny as well as the Haldane family members who stand to gain from silencing the truth. Pérez must apprehend the suspect before crowds descend for Up Helly Aa, the biggest fire festival in Europe.

=== Series 2 (2014) ===
The series is based on Raven Black, Dead Water and Blue Lightning, the first, fourth and fifth novel by Ann Cleeves.

No. overall	No. in series	Title	Directed by	Written by	Original release date	UK viewers (millions)
3	1	"Raven Black – Part 1"	John McKay	Gaby Chiappe	11 March 2014	6.37
DI Jimmy Pérez and his team investigate the murder of a teenage girl whose body was found on a secluded beach, and time and again the same name crops up—that of local recluse Magnus Bain, whose home overlooks the crime scene and who had forged an unlikely friendship with the victim. But then the procurator fiscal draws attention to the unsolved disappearance of a girl named Catriona 19 years previously—a case that shares several similarities with this one.
4	2	"Raven Black – Part 2"	John McKay	Gaby Chiappe	18 March 2014	6.16
The discovery of seven-year-old Catriona's body after almost two decades prompts Jimmy Pérez to take Magnus in for further questioning. But at the station, the recluse's distress leads to his attacking the inspector, and Magnus is sent for a psychological evaluation. Ploughing on, Pérez re-examines the evidence, but it is only when Catriona's brother reveals she had a secret hiding place at their old home—the same house where Catherine also lived—that he finally sees a glimmer of hope.
5	3	"Dead Water – Part 1"	David Moore	David Kane	25 March 2014	5.56
A journalist dies in a suspicious car accident, and when it turns out he was an old friend of Pérez's, a forensic scientist is called in to ensure an objective view of the case. As the team awaits her results, they look into the reasons for the victim's return to the island and find he was chasing a lead about plans for a controversial new gas pipeline.
6	4	"Dead Water – Part 2"	David Moore	David Kane	1 April 2014	5.53
The discovery of John Henderson's body leads DI Pérez to wonder if this second killing is linked to the death of his journalist friend Jerry, a theory given greater weight by forensic investigator Willow Reeves' finds. But then the case takes another surprising turn with the arrival of Jerry's fiancee, carrying a memory stick he gave to her for safekeeping several weeks earlier.
7	5	"Blue Lightning – Part 1"	Stewart Svaasand	Richard Davidson	8 April 2014	5.29
A scientist is found dead in the bird observatory on Fair Isle, Pérez's childhood home, so Pérez and Tosh make their way across to the island, where they are greeted by Pérez's father—just before flights are grounded by incoming storms. Working alone and without a forensic team, the detectives talk to the victim's friends, family, and colleagues—and as tensions run high, the storm forces Pérez and the suspects to remain together under a single roof.
8	6	"Blue Lightning – Part 2"	Stewart Svaasand	Richard Davidson	15 April 2014	5.33
Time is running out for Pérez and Tosh as their prime suspect lies critically ill in hospital, but it's unclear whether the fire that put him there was a drunken accident or if he was the second victim of Anna's real killer. The DI turns his attention to Finlay Caulfield regarding the photos of Anna on his camera, and while it becomes clear he was obsessed with her, it may not be enough to charge the stalker with her murder. There are still so many unanswered questions—until Sandy spots something on the CCTV footage that takes the investigation in a new direction.

=== Series 3 (2016) ===
This series is the first written as a six-part story and not based on an Ann Cleeves novel.

No. overall	No. in series	Title	Directed by	Written by	Original release date	UK viewers (millions)
9	1	"Episode 1"	Thaddeus O'Sullivan	Gaby Chiappe	15 January 2016	6.82
When a young man disappears on a ferry crossing and a small boy ends up in intensive care after overdosing on Ecstasy, Pérez and the team become convinced the two events are connected.
10	2	"Episode 2"	Thaddeus O'Sullivan	Robert Murphy	22 January 2016	6.02
Pérez grows convinced that Michael Maguire is implicated in the grisly death of a young man, discovered in a shipping container.
11	3	"Episode 3"	Thaddeus O'Sullivan	Robert Murphy	5 February 2016	6.21
Pérez and Tosh's investigation leads them to Glasgow, where they hope to uncover the truth behind Maguire's brutal death and his connection to Robbie Morton. Old ghosts return to haunt Pérez, with his enemies trying to prevent him from getting to the truth.
12	4	"Episode 4"	Jan Matthys	Gaby Chiappe & Alexander Perrin	12 February 2016	6.26
Pérez and the team are determined to track down the person who aided Michael Thompson's killer, but as the case gathers pace, the officers involved find they are all under threat. Sandy comes across the killer by chance in a ruined building, and is knocked out. Tosh, returning from Glasgow, is abducted at the airport.
13	5	"Episode 5"	Jan Matthys	Gaby Chiappe	19 February 2016	6.55
Tosh returns apparently unharmed, but the truth later comes out. Pérez continues to investigate the double murder case, but finds bureaucracy getting in the way, until he tracks down a rape victim and discovers that her attacker was the son of Phyllis Brennan, a Procurator Fiscal and the partner of his boss Rhona.
14	6	"Episode 6"	Jan Matthys	David Kane	4 March 2016	6.14
Pérez and the team discover that the person responsible for the deaths of Robbie Morton and Michael Thompson is closer to home than they had thought. This episode was delayed due to an FA Cup match replay.

=== Series 4 (2018) ===
No. overall	No. in series	Title	Directed by	Written by	Original release date	UK viewers (millions)
15	1	"Episode 1"	Lee Haven Jones	David Kane	13 February 2018	6.72
Pérez and the team are forced to reopen a 23-year-old cold case when convicted murderer Thomas Malone is released from prison on appeal. The case concerns teenager Lizzie Kilmuir, who was found strangled to death in a lime kiln on Unst. Upon returning to Shetland, Thomas tries to make amends with Lizzie's twin sister, Kate. Meanwhile, local journalist Sally McColl attends the Shetland Folk Festival with a group of her friends but doesn't return home that evening. The next day, she is found strangled to death in a lime kiln, in what looks like a copy of Lizzie's murder. Pérez is forced to break the news to Drew, Sally's father, a former police officer who led the investigation into Lizzie's murder and now believes Thomas killed Sally. A group of men drag Thomas from his home and try to bury him alive.
16	2	"Episode 2"	Lee Haven Jones	Louise Ironside	20 February 2018	6.28
Pérez investigates who attacked Thomas, and circumstances point to Benny Ray, who'd been a witness at Thomas's trial. Sally's friend Jo Halley, who is a deaf lipreader, tells Sandy she saw Sally arguing with someone in Norwegian at the folk festival. Pérez's stepdaughter Cassie starts volunteering at a wildlife sanctuary run by Donna Killick, mother of Sally's boyfriend Alan. A DNA test on a hair found on the scarf used to strangle Lizzie Kilmuir reveals it came from a male relative of Alan. However, tissue from Donna's deceased husband indicates that he is not Alan's father. Tosh interviews employees at Forst energy, a Norwegian company that Sally had been investigating for unsafe practices. Alan tells Cassie that he realized Sally had been lying to him before her death. Pérez learns that Thomas's trial was unethical, partly because Benny Ray, who testified against him, was a police informant paid by Drew McColl.
17	3	"Episode 3"	Lee Haven Jones	Paul Logue	28 February 2018	6.08
Donna Killick claims she cannot identify Alan's biological father. Benny Ray is hospitalized after being attacked by Thomas but refuses to give a statement. Tosh heads to Norway to track down Forst employee Andreas Hagan, who is suspected of covering up a fatal accident. She meets detective Lars Bleymann, who drives her to Hagan's cabin. Hagan claims he hadn't seen Sally for three weeks and wasn't concerned about her article. Investigating Sally's last trip to Norway, Tosh finds she met with a man named Mati, a member of the far-right Norwegian Defense Army who threatened to kill her. When Tosh returns to her hotel room, someone is going through her belongings, pushes past her and runs away. Pérez joins Tosh, and they find Mathias Soderland listed as a far-right activist by the Norwegian police. Tosh recognises him as the man who was in her room, and a visit to Mati's mother reveals that he is the son of Andreas Hagan. Pérez realizes that they have been followed throughout their day in Norway. This episode was delayed by 24 hours due to a FA Cup match replay.
18	4	"Episode 4"	Rebecca Gatward	David Kane	6 March 2018	5.31
The people who have been following Pérez and Tosh are with the Norwegian secret service and tell them Mathias Soderland, the prime suspect for Sally's death, is providing them with information on the far-right Norwegian Defense Army. When Mati is found shot in the head, bearing a sign reading "traitor", Pérez and Tosh are forced to return to Shetland. Pérez is told to concentrate on investigating Sally's death and leave Lizzie's death to a team from Glasgow. Alan Killick brings in a video he found of his father's 30th birthday party, a week before Lizzie's death. Attendees included Lizzie, Kate, Drew McColl, Thomas and Duncan Hunter, Cassie's biological father. Pérez asks Duncan about the party, but Duncan says he doesn't remember anything about it. Sandy answers a distress call from Jo Halley and arrives at her croft to find it has been ransacked and she has been attacked.
19	5	"Episode 5"	Rebecca Gatward	David Kane	13 March 2018	6.21
Pérez asks his team to search for evidence regarding the attack on Jo, who is hospitalized. When the Glasgow team arrives to take over the investigation into Lizzie's murder, DI Jessie Cole suggests they also take on Sally's murder, since they may be connected. Tosh questions whether Lars, who had come to Shetland to take their statements about Mati's murder, might be involved in Sally's murder. Although he'd claimed it was his first trip to Shetland, he was aware of roadworks that were done on the island a week earlier. CCTV footage of Sally before and after she went to Norway reveals a new memory stick on her keychain. Found among her personal effects, it includes video footage of Lars at a far-right meeting. Captured after trying to enter Jo's hospital room, Lars reveals himself to be a virulent racist. He admits to assaulting Jo but denies being involved in the murders. He claims to have seen Sally arguing on the night of the festival with an older man, who he identifies as Duncan. Pérez reviews the birthday party footage and realizes that Duncan had the scarf that was used to strangle Lizzie.
20	6	"Episode 6"	Rebecca Gatward	David Kane	20 March 2018	6.10
Pérez has to bring Duncan in for questioning. Duncan's DNA matches the sample found on Lizzie's scarf, proving that he is Alan's father. Duncan admits to the affair with Donna Killick but insists he didn't murder Lizzie or Sally. Pérez is forced to tell Cassie that Alan, with whom she has become close, is her half-brother. Duncan denies sleeping with Lizzie and mentions that Donna was annoyed with her flirtatious behaviour. He admits arguing with Sally, who was urging him to tell Alan he was his father. A review of images on Sally's memory stick reveals a picture showing Donna on the Unst Ferry on the day after Lizzie disappeared. Donna confesses to killing Lizzie, who had threatened to tell her abusive husband about the affair with Duncan. Drew McColl tells Pérez that Sally knew what Donna had done and hated him for covering up for her. In order to protect Donna, he killed his own daughter. Finally cleared of both murders, Thomas suffers a fatal heart attack and dies as a free man.

=== Series 5 (2019) ===
No. overall	No. in series	Title	Directed by	Written by	Original release date	UK viewers (millions)
21	1	"Episode 1"	Gordon Anderson	David Kane	12 February 2019	7.29
A severed hand washes up on a Shetland beach, and a bag containing a head and further body parts is discovered on another beach. The victim is determined to be Daniel Ugara who was in Shetland to find his sister Zezi, both originally from Nigeria. A video sent to Daniel's phone of Zezi pleading for him to cooperate with someone leads Pérez to determine the murder has connections to a human trafficking ring.
22	2	"Episode 2"	Gordon Anderson	Paul Logue	19 February 2019	6.86
Members of the Hayes family, who were suspected of involvement in Daniel's murder, are found dead in their home. Pérez questions Daniel and Zezi's mother Olivia Lennox, who had blood on her sleeve but says the Hayes were already dead when she arrived at their home. He finds evidence that Calum Dunwoody's fishing trawler is being used to transport trafficking victims. Paul Kiernan, who runs a derelict local hotel, is seen as one of Zezi's captors. Frustrated by the pace of the investigation, Olivia wants to pay the ransom to get Zezi released. Tosh finds that a building owned by the Hayes is being used as a cannabis farm. Kiernan is identified as Glasgow criminal Aaron McGuire. Calum commits suicide in his cell with a pen Sandy had given him to write down the names of his contacts.
23	3	"Episode 3"	Gordon Anderson	David Kane	26 February 2019	7.01
Believing McGuire is a crucial figure in the gang, Pérez travels to Glasgow, where DI Sam Boyd tells him McGuire probably plays a very small role. McGuire's ex-wife claims to have no idea what he is doing, but Pérez and Boyd follow her to a flat McGuire owns that contains several frightened trafficking victims. Sandy is questioned about his role in Calum's suicide. Zezi escapes from the house where McGuire has held her and another girl named Niki, but the woman she flags down is Andrea Doyle, a member of the gang who brings her back to McGuire.
24	4	"Episode 4"	Isabelle Sieb	Paul Logue	5 March 2019	6.65
Believing Zezi is still on the island, Pérez and the team look out for McGuire and for connections to Glasgow businessman Graeme Benson, who owns the hotel where victims were kept. Calum's wife Morag retracts information she had given Sandy the previous day, indicating that she had been threatened. Her house is later firebombed. Tosh finds that Benson had called Carla Hayes in the week before she was killed. Jamie Hayes, who survived the attack on his family, confirms that Benson was a friend of his mother. Morag tells Pérez that Calum was forced to dump Daniel's body parts at sea. Benson shows up at Pérez's house when his stepdaughter Cassie is there alone and leaves when the young officer who was supposed to be guarding her returns. When confronted by Pérez, Benson claims he'd come by to see Duncan Hunter. Sandy finds evidence that Andrea Doyle, the woman who kept Zezi from escaping, firebombed Morag's house, and she is arrested. A desperate Olivia, who previously demanded that Jamie help her find Zezi, carjacks him. Zezi's companion Niki, who had been ill, dies.
25	5	"Episode 5"	Isabelle Sieb	David Kane	12 March 2019	6.66
Andrea Doyle tells Pérez that she and McGuire are "just the tip of the iceberg" and that if the ransom is not paid and they cannot get Zezi off the island, McGuire will kill her. The team travels to the house where the girls had been kept but only finds Niki's body. They find the house belongs to Duncan, who claims it should be vacant. Tosh finds that Olivia's alibi for the Hayes murders is invalid. Olivia threatens to drive the car with her and Jamie in it off a cliff but is stopped by Pérez. Sandy is questioned about events around Calum's suicide. The team arranges for Olivia to call McGuire and offer to pay the ransom. Upon arriving at the dropoff, McGuire receives a call alerting him to the setup and drives off. He goes off the road and flips the van, but the team finds Zezi is not in the van. Worried about Cassie and his business problems, Duncan drinks until he passes out on the beach. The next morning he finds four bodies in the water.
26	6	"Episode 6"	Isabelle Sieb	Paul Logue	19 March 2019	6.80
Duncan is traumatized by his discovery of the bodies. Pérez focuses on who tipped off McGuire − who has died from the accident − and is concerned that Alice Brooks, with whom he's been exploring a relationship, might be the leak. The PIRC recommends that Sandy be suspended, but Pérez delays telling him. Tosh's friend Donnie tells her his employer, suspected of using trafficked workers, made secret payments to a company for which Alice is the registered owner. Significant evidence suggests that Alice's husband Chris, who registered the company in her name, is involved in the trafficking scheme. Pérez finds Zezi in a house owned by Chris. A despairing Olivia contemplates suicide but is interrupted by Pérez's call. Zezi identifies Chris Brooks as the trafficker who brought her to Scotland. Chris is captured but tells Pérez he was not involved in the Hayes murders, which turn out to have been committed by Jamie's girlfriend, Rosie. Zezi and Olivia begin to reconcile. Pérez tells Sandy of his suspension. Alice tells Pérez their relationship cannot work.

=== Series 6 (2021) ===
No. overall	No. in series	Title	Directed by	Written by	Original release date	UK viewers (millions)
27	1	"Episode 1"	Max Myers	David Kane	20 October 2021	8.04
On the day of Pérez's mother's funeral, local lawyer Alex Galbraith is shot dead at his front door. The team focuses on two cases of Galbraith's: his defence of Donna Killick, who is getting compassionate release from prison, and a custody battle involving Lynda Morton, a local drug addict. In an earlier break-in at Galbraith's home, the file on Lynda's case was taken. Kate Kilmuir leads a group protesting the release of the woman who killed her sister. The investigation is impeded by the interference of Fraser Creggan, a local teenager who starts a true crime blog. Pérez also suspects Fraser's father Logan may be involved, due to Galbraith's refusing to help him with a previous case. Cassie brings Pérez's father, who is suffering from dementia, back to stay with them. The team learn that Eamon Gauldie, a local pipeline worker, may have taken a picture of the killer with his drone, which was stolen the next night. The local paper posts crime-scene photos of Lizzie Kilmuir's murder. Eamon is killed when a key valve on the decompression chamber of the dive boat where he works is loosened.
28	2	"Episode 2"	Max Myers	Paul Logue	27 October 2021	7.54
Pérez is convinced that Eamon Gauldie was murdered but is forced to leave the investigation to the industrial safety inspectors. Mick Muir, a member of the dive boat crew, is suspected of causing Eamon's death and is assaulted in his cabin. Tosh's boyfriend Donnie finds that the crime-scene photos appear to have been leaked by someone with access to the police computer system. Galbraith's daughter Merran suspects her father was having an affair. It appears that he has regularly been visiting a religious retreat, meeting with Sister Carolyn there. Pérez visits Donna Killick, who is dying of cancer and angry with him for not bringing up extenuating circumstances at her trial. The files from Eamon's drone are corrupted, but Donnie is able to access one that shows Kate Kilmuir's car ramming Galbraith's car. Kate denies following Galbraith home. Duncan visits Donna and challenges her for returning to Shetland. The team discovers that Mick Muir is Logan Creggan's brother-in-law. Sandy follows Lynda Morton and her dealer Curtis Galt to a deserted property, where he is knocked over when the two of them drive away.
29	3	"Episode 3"	Max Myers	David Kane	3 November 2021	7.43
Recovering from being knocked over, Sandy tells Pérez he believes Lynda is in danger. Locked in a shipping container by Curtis, Lynda calls Pérez for help and is rescued. Curtis is captured and admits to the break-in at the Galbraith house, but neither he nor Lynda seems to have anything to do with Galbraith's death. Kate's daughter Molly stole and destroyed Gauldie's drone, fearing the footage might implicate her mother. Galbraith was having an affair with his assistant Fiona Bedford, but her husband Darren has an alibi for the time of the murder. Pérez tells Galbraith's widow Eve about the affair. Fraser posts a video confessing to Galbraith's murder, but Pérez releases him when his story does not match the details. Pérez's father's dementia is becoming more of an issue, but Pérez resists having him officially diagnosed. Duncan is unable to encourage his and Donna's son Alan to visit her before she dies. Men show up at the Creggan house and throw petrol bombs, sending Logan—who suffers from PTSD—into a flashback. He runs out shooting, and Fraser hits the ground. Pérez arrives and finds Fraser dead and equipment that could make the custom bullets that killed Galbraith.
30	4	"Episode 4"	Siri Rødnes	Paul Logue	10 November 2021	6.95
Logan enters the Kilmuir home, tells Molly that Fraser is dead and takes Kate's car. He is convinced that either Eve Galbraith, who is running for parliament, or her campaign manager Niven Guthrie ordered the attack. Logan prepares to shoot at them during Eve's press conference but is prevented when he experiences a flashback of the previous night. The industrial safety inspectors determine that Mick accidentally caused Eamon's death. Tosh looks into Galbraith's involvement with Maurice Ross, an elderly man whose daughter MarieAnne went missing more than 20 years ago. He says that Galbraith located her in London and believes that she is paying for his care home, but the care has actually been paid for by Galbraith. Logan shows up at Niven's home and beats him. Pérez finds the petrol bombing was carried out by a group of Merran's friends, just as Logan arrives at the beach and begins to attack her. Under questioning, Logan realizes that he shot Fraser during a flashback. Donnie tells Tosh that Sandy leaked the crime scene photos.
31	5	"Episode 5"	Siri Rødnes	David Kane	17 November 2021	6.76
Logan Creggan is being transferred to a mental health facility. Fiona Bedford tells Pérez that her husband Darren was tracking her phone and probably knew about her affair with Galbraith. Tosh learns that Niven paid off the debts of dive boat chef Carrie McAndrew just before Eamon's accident. Niven's brother Struan was not aware that he'd done so with their family company's funds. He tells Tosh that Galbraith suspected Niven of risking their employee's safety to cut costs and had argued with him about it. Sandy tells Tosh he'd leaked the photos in an effort to prevent Donna's return to Shetland. Pérez and Tosh look into the disappearance of MarieAnne Ross and learn she was best friends with Lynn Richardson, now known as Sister Carolyn. On the phone with Pérez, Lynn admits she helped Galbraith, Niven, and Darren cover up MarieAnne's death, but she is attacked before being found by Pérez and Tosh. Donna gets Duncan to help her commit suicide by putting all of her pain medication in her hot chocolate. Pérez realises what happened but covers it up.
32	6	"Episode 6"	Siri Rødnes	David Kane	24 November 2021	7.00
After Lynn dies in the hospital, Darren admits that MarieAnne died after taking drugs Galbraith and Niven supplied, and they buried her body the next morning. Galbraith was going to publicly admit what happened, but Niven insists that he did not kill him. Niven got Carrie to tamper with the valve on the ship to give Eamon a scare. She believes that Eamon was blackmailing Niven. Pérez eventually realizes that Merran—who was on the phone with her father when he was shot—recognised her mother's distinctive doorbell ring. Eve murdered Alex to stop him revealing the truth about MarieAnne's death and had Lynn drive her car into Lerwick to give her an alibi. Then she had Niven kill Lynn. Donna sent a letter to her lawyer claiming Duncan was going to kill her and make it look like suicide and Pérez would cover it up. Duncan turns himself in for assisting suicide, but in light of Donna's letter, Pérez is arrested as well. Tosh discovers that she is pregnant.

=== Series 7 (2022) ===
This is the seventh and final series to star Douglas Henshall as DI Jimmy Perez.

No. overall	No. in series	Title	Directed by	Written by	Original release date	UK viewers (millions)
33	1	"Episode 1"	Fiona Walton	David Kane	10 August 2022	5.60
After a suspension, Pérez is cleared of wrongdoing. Duncan is in prison and says that he will not return to Shetland. Pérez's father has died, and Tosh and Donnie now have a daughter. Connor Cairns, who attempted suicide a year before, has published a graphic novel based on Shetland folklore. The night of the book launch, his sister Abbie and a friend are forced off the road by a white camper van, and Connor does not return home. He did not stay with his girlfriend Bryd Fleming. Someone breaks into the Cairns house at night and leaves a threatening display of knives in the kitchen. Danny Cairns is a former Ayr police officer who was arrested for stealing drugs and getting a dealer Pepper Waldron killed. Connor's scooter is found near a sea cliff, but there is no sign of him or his body. Pepper's uncle and cousin, Cameron and Nicole Waldron, were driving the camper van and leave what appears to be a body bag with Connor's face on it outside the Cairns home. They are arrested and admit to running Abbie off the road and the break-in with the knives, but no evidence connects them to Connor's disappearance, so Pérez orders them released. A suitcase containing a body is found in the sea, but it is not Connor.
34	2	"Episode 2"	Fiona Walton	David Kane and Paul Logue	17 August 2022	5.70
Rachel Cairns tells Pérez that Connor argued with the owners of Davidson Disposal, where he used to work. Tosh meets with them, who say that they have not seen Connor since the day they fired him. Pérez asks Danny to come in and make a statement about his history. Instead he goes to Ayr and meets with his old partner Jill Stevens, who is no longer with the force. Pérez follows but is blocked by Danny's former superior, DCI Reid. Danny confronts the Waldrons, and when Nicole holds him at gunpoint, he admits that his plan to get Pepper to be an informant went wrong and he is responsible for Pepper's death. Connor's girlfriend Bryd leaves a voice message for him, saying that if he does not call her, she will talk to the police. The Waldrons tell Pérez that Pepper had a contact inside the police. Danny believes that it was Reid and breaks into her home but is stopped by Pérez. He realizes that Jill was working with Pepper because he was blackmailing her over her drug-addicted brother. She admits that she told Pepper that Danny had stolen his drugs and killed him to protect Danny. Bryd receives a text, apparently from Connor, asking to meet. Next morning, she is found dead in the trunk of a junked car.
35	3	"Episode 3"	Fiona Walton	Denise Paul	24 August 2022	5.94
Bryd was killed in the same way as the first victim. Connor's signet ring is found in the car where Bryd's body was found, which had been reported as abandoned. Sandy interviews Abbie's friend Clana, who was seen on CCTV talking with Bryd as she left the school residence hall where she worked. She tells Sandy that Bryd received a text from Connor as she was leaving. Abbie tells Pérez that she was not originally concerned about Connor, since he had told her he might have to go away for a while. She says he had been blackmailed into helping drug dealers in Glasgow, and his inability to extricate himself had led to his suicide attempt. Granton Davidson is caught with toxic waste in his van and arrested. Sheena Davidson tells Tosh that she saw Connor on the night he disappeared, arguing on a roadside with someone she could not recognize. Her information helps police find Connor's phone. The car Bryd's body was found in belonged to artist Lloyd Anderson, who says that he bought it to use in a painting and left it in a field. The first victim is identified as William Rodgers, an American visitor to the island. Tosh checks out an isolated location where Connor's phone had been tracked and finds an old caravan. She is trapped inside as a bomb is about to explode.
36	4	"Episode 4"	Louis Paxton	Paul Logue	31 August 2022	5.94
Tosh survives the blast but is reluctant to talk to anyone about what happened. The caravan's owner says that he rented it to Connor. Pérez believes Connor killed Bryd and issues a warrant for his arrest. Visiting bomb expert DI Brookes thinks Connor had the knowledge to construct the bomb and might have links to a terrorist group. After talking with Danny, Pérez realizes that environmental activism was a theme of everything Connor did. Connor is found dead on the beach. At first it appears he threw himself from the cliff, but the autopsy finds he was tortured before being murdered the same way Bryd was. It appears like someone is trying to suggest that Connor killed Bryd and then himself. Abbie is suspicious of photographer Martin Otina, who has been staying at the Cairns B&B, and searches his room with help from her friend Clana, discovering a hidden camera card. Pérez and Tosh find the place—an abandoned church—where Connor and Bryd were held and killed. Sandy finds that Lloyd went to the same school as Rodgers under a different name. When Brookes gives Tosh a coat button that she had lost in the explosion, she finally breaks down, calls Donnie and asks him to bring her home.
37	5	"Episode 5"	Louis Paxton	David Kane	7 September 2022	5.84
Lloyd tells Pérez he fled the United States after being framed for the murder of a police officer, a crime for which he'd be executed. Pérez arrests him for killing William Rodgers. Fertiliser of the kind used in the first bomb is stolen from a local supplier. Lloyd says that Rodgers appeared to recognize him in a local store but seemed to want to avoid him. Pérez suggests that he killed Rodgers, Connor—who knew his true identity—and Bryd to hide his secret. A date written on debris from the caravan explosion suggests a connection to the 1993 MV Braer tanker disaster. Pérez asks Sandy to look for local families or businesses affected by the oil spill. The camera card found by Abbie reveals Martin's photos of the local oil terminal, harbour authority, Bryd, Rodgers and Lloyd. Martin is actually DI Calvin Walker of the Counterterrorism Unit, monitoring a potential threat in Shetland. He suspects Rodgers—who had been advocating for climate action online—Connor and Bryd were involved in an eco-terrorist cell. Tosh suspects a message in a library book cell members were using to communicate referred to Carol Anne Manè, an ex of Donnie's who had been asking him about Tosh and who works at the oil terminal. Carol Anne is arrested but denies everything. Ally Fleet, whose family lost their fishing business in the Braer disaster, aims his boat at an oil tanker heading for the terminal but veers away at the last minute. No explosives are found on his boat, but someone else is seen constructing a bomb.
38	6	"Episode 6"	Louis Paxton	David Kane	14 September 2022	5.79
Ally admits he, Rodgers, Carol Anne, Connor and Bryd were part of a plan to plant a bomb at the oil terminal and phone in a warning before it went off. The mastermind behind it was Connor's publisher, Jamie Narey, whose girlfriend was killed working as an anti-oil activist. After Rodgers disappeared, both Ally and Connor began to have second thoughts. Jamie kidnapped and tortured Connor to get the location of the explosives. With a bomb in his car, Jaime parks outside an oil company office, but when police arrive, he drives off. He parks his truck in Lerwick and walks away, but hesitates to set off the bomb with so many people around. When the bomb squad finds no active bomb in the vehicle, the team realizes that he must have a smaller bomb with him. Jamie steals a car and drives with the bomb to the coast where the Braer disaster took place. After a brief standoff, Jaime is shot in the shoulder by police and flings the bomb away, allowing it to explode harmlessly. He admits he was going to let the bomb go off at the terminal and confesses to killing Connor and Bryd but not William Rodgers. Pérez discovers that Lloyd's girlfriend Alison had murdered Rodgers when he threatened to reveal Lloyd's secret. Alison confesses and is taken into custody. Not wanting to send an innocent man to be executed, Pérez lets Lloyd go before the extradition papers arrive and resigns from the police, leaving Tosh in charge.

=== Series 8 (2023) ===
This series introduces Ashley Jensen as DI Ruth Calder.

No. overall	No. in series	Title	Directed by	Written by	Original release date	UK viewers (millions)
39	1	"Episode 1"	Andy Newbery	Paul Logue	1 November 2023	5.60
In London, a police informant, Remis, is murdered by hitmen working for crime boss Cassidy. A young woman, Ellen Quinn, witnessed the murder while robbing Remis's flat and flees to Shetland. DI Ruth Calder, who grew up in Shetland, is sent to the islands, where Tosh has been investigating ritualized sheep killings. They find Ellen hiding at a holiday home managed by a friend, Rosemary, but she gives them the slip. Grace Bain, Ellen's grandmother and matriarch of the prominent family, orders a search. Ellen's bag, containing the drug money she stole from Remis, is taken from her when she falls asleep during a bus journey. The two hitmen, Howell and Nowak, chance upon Ellen in a shop, where Nowak shoots the shopkeeper. They force Ellen into their car and drive away. After Howell pulls over, Ellen struggles with Nowak in the car and slams the door on him, causing Nowak to accidentally shoot himself. To get away from Howell, Ellen then jumps off a cliff into the sea. Later that night, as she is walking along a road, a car pulls up behind her. The next morning she is found dead.
40	2	"Episode 2"	Andy Newbery	Paul Logue	8 November 2023	5.63
Howell forces crofter Agnes Moffat to shelter him and the critically injured Nowak while they try to find a way off the island. Ruth wonders why Ellen was strangled rather than shot. Ruth's old friend Cal Innes is interviewed after his van is reported to have been parked near where Ellen's body was found. She resists the idea that Cal might have brought Ellen to the isolated area. Ellen's uncle Bobby tracks down Gerry Bryce, the young man who robbed her. He beats him, takes the money, drives him to the ferry terminal and orders him off the island. Howell carries Nowak out to Agnes's Land Rover and drives off, followed by Tosh − who recognizes Agnes's car − and Ruth. At the beach where Howell hopes to be picked up by Cassidy's boat, he is arrested. Nowak dies before the ambulance arrives. Howell insists to Ruth that they did not kill Ellen. Cal tells Ellen's cousin, Neil, that he had to dispose of the illegal drugs that were in his van. Tosh discovers a tattoo on Ellen's body that matches the symbol found on the dead sheep.
41	3	"Episode 3"	Andy Newbery	Denise Paul	15 November 2023	5.75
A corn doll is found where Ellen's body was discovered. Tosh and Ruth learn it might have been made by Jane Knox, whose family had fallen out with the Bains over a real estate sale. They speak to her son, Tom, who later claims he and Ellen were secretly friends. Sandy learns Ellen tried to contact psychiatrist Azir Sadat, who had treated her the previous year. Azir is being blackmailed by Neil's mother, Heather, over the drowning of his son Akmal. Ellen's uncle Bobby, who has debts, tells Neil he wants to invest in his drug dealing. Ellen's body is stolen from the hospital morgue. Tom, who spends time at the hospital with his sick mother, is suspected. He admits leaving the corn doll and that he loved Ellen but insists he did not take her body. Peter Ayre, who lives near where Ellen was found, is caught trying to burn her body in a pagan ritual, with a version of the symbol in Ellen's tattoo and on the slaughtered sheep burning on the ground. Ruth suspects her sister-in-law, Amma, knew Ellen, based on cigarette butts found in the cottage where Ellen was hiding. She also is told her late father had an affair with Ellen's mother, Stella, despite her being half his age.
42	4	"Episode 4"	Giulia Gandini	Vivienne Harvey and Paul Logue	22 November 2023	5.65
Peter is now prime suspect in Ellen's murder and claims Ellen shared his pagan Norse beliefs. Ruth admits her suspicions about Amma to Tosh. They learn that Amma had put Ellen in touch with her London flatmate, who was with Ellen the night of the robbery. Amma admits meeting with Ellen at the holiday home but was unable to help her return the money. While Peter's phone records indicate he was in his croft during the night that Ellen was killed, letters found there show he had an apprentice on the island, who was involved in the sheep killings. A hospital pass belonging to Rosemary's boyfriend, Liam, was used to gain access to the morgue to steal Ellen's body. Rosemary turns out to be an old friend of Peter's, helped him take Ellen's body and is behind the sheep killings. Ruth secretly has a DNA test run to see if Ellen was her half sister. It comes back negative, which prompts Tosh—who took the call reporting the results—to refuse any further help from her. Trying to help Ruth, Cal attempts to elicit information from Bobby. As he drives home from spending an evening drinking and using drugs with Bobby, his van runs off the road, and he goes through the windscreen.
43	5	"Episode 5"	Giulia Gandini	Paul Logue	29 November 2023	5.54
Ruth's brother Alan tells her that Stella met many times with their father, the local minister, before marrying Kieran Quinn. Ruth convinces Sandy to let her help investigate Cal's death. They learn about his and Neil's drug dealing and find that Bobby has the money Ellen stole. Bobby was also in London and was heard arguing with Ellen three days before she came back to Shetland. Tosh suspects that Ellen was upset over Akmal Sadat's drowning. His mother, Farida, confesses to Tosh that she fell asleep after taking unprescribed medication that Azir had given her, and Akmal fell into the loch. Ellen and Heather had found him, and Heather took the lead in covering up how it happened. In an interview with Tosh, Azir admits being blackmailed by Heather. He also reveals that Ellen had come to see him the night she died and that he drove her back to her family home.
44	6	"Episode 6"	Giulia Gandini	Paul Logue	6 December 2023	5.46
Tosh and Ruth secure a warrant to search the Bain farm. They arrest Bobby and question him about his arguing with Ellen in London and why she left Shetland in the first place. The search team find Ellen's coat in the Bain barn, and her brother Rory admits helping her hide there. Under questioning by Tosh and Ruth, Grace admits she saw Ellen at the farm that night but refuses to say anything about their interaction. A DNA test confirms the growing suspicion that Ellen was the daughter of Stella and Bobby, conceived in an incestuous liaison while grieving their father's death. Stella then confided in Ruth's dad, which led to the belief they were having an affair. Ellen left Shetland after Bobby revealed the truth to her. On the day Ellen died, Kieran—her presumed father—had gone out searching for her after she left the farm. He found her and tried to talk her into going to the police to report Howell and Nowak. Arguing with him, she blurted out that he wasn't her father, and when she kept goading him about it, he lost his temper and strangled her. Kieran is arrested. Cal's death was found to be an accident resulting from driving under the influence. Bobby anonymously gives the stolen money to the Knoxes. Ruth elects to stay on Shetland to build bridges with her brother Alan.

=== Series 9 (2024) ===
No. overall	No. in series	Title	Directed by	Written by	Original release date	UK viewers (millions)
45	1	"Episode 1"	Andrew Cumming	Paul Logue	6 November 2024	5.18
Ruth is talking to Malcolm Kidd, a jittery young man holding a shotgun. His brother's body lies between them. Malcolm keeps begging to see his fiancée Eleanor and says "It's all because of Bergen." Malcolm panics when Ruth's cell phone rings, and Tosh and the team waiting outside hear a gunshot. They charge in, find Ruth uninjured and take Malcolm into custody. That night, Tosh attends a party and witnesses the argument of married couple Annie and Ian Bett. Their 9-year-old son, Noah, says that his parents are separating. Before they leave, Annie tells Tosh that she wants to speak to her about something important. They arrange to meet the next morning at the home of mussel farmer John Harris, where Annie and Noah have been staying. But when Tosh arrives, neither she nor Noah is there, and Annie is not picking up her phone. Malcolm wants to make a full confession to murdering his brother Andrew, even though Ruth believes that he did not intend it. Ruth meets with Eleanor, who admits to having an affair with Andrew. Ruth and Tosh go to Ian's house, which has been broken into, and find Professor Euan Rossi, Annie's former Oxford maths tutor. He says that the door was broken in when he arrived and that he received a voice mail from her the preceding night asking for help, which induced him to fly up to Shetland. The police put out alerts for Annie, Noah and Ian, who also is not answering his phone. Noah is found, unharmed but covered in blood and so traumatised that he will not speak. Ruth and Tosh find Annie's bloody body in a building being renovated by Ian's company. Another body — French citizen Anton Bergen — is found in the attic.
46	2	"Episode 2"	Andrew Cumming	Paul Logue	13 November 2024	5.48
At the hospital, Ruth asks Noah what happened; he says that he cannot remember and has a panic attack. Malcolm explains he lost £1,000 to Anton in a poker game, money that was supposed to be for his wedding to Eleanor. He went to Andrew's house instead of going home and found Andrew and Eleanor together. He denies knowing Anton before their game and says that he had not spoken with Annie in years. Ian is found drunk and semi-conscious with blood on his clothes. Anton was employed by recent arrivals on the island, Karin and Stefan Jakobson, as a nurse for their daughter Astrid, who has a genetic condition. Constable Alex Grant tries to find Lisa Friel, who had argued with Annie the day she died. She and Angus Wallace are spying on a new marine research facility. Ian is arrested when it is discovered that he sent threatening text messages accusing Annie of having an affair. Nathan Huang, son of the poker game organiser JJ, was seeing Anton, who broke up with him the day he died. Cora finds that Annie had been shot in the shoulder years earlier, although it's not mentioned in her medical record. When the blood on Ian's clothes is found to be his, Tosh has him released. As Ian leaves the station, John Harris hits him with his truck, believing that he is responsible for Annie's death. The Organised Crime and Counter Terrorism Unit (OCCTU) requests a report from Ruth on Annie. Ruth tells Professor Rossi she has deduced that he and Annie were working for OCCTU.
47	3	"Episode 3"	Andrew Cumming	Paul Logue	20 November 2024	5.21
Angus goes missing after breaking into the research facility, and Lisa goes to Ruth's brother Alan for help. Ruth visits the facility and meets the head, Dr Devina Mohan. John confesses to the assault on Ian. Suspicion falls on John's son Patrick, who was stealing money from the business to fund his gambling habit until Annie caught him. He says he was with JJ Huang the night Annie was killed. Tosh and Ruth talk to Noah, who says he slept through the shootings. Later Ruth works out that Annie and Noah picked up Anton near the research facility. Astrid says she was the one who called Anton the night he died and claims she just wanted to ask about movie they'd be watching. Professor Rossi tells Ruth that the Jakobsons were under surveillance by the intelligence services and no one knows how Stefan got the money to start his hedge fund business. Joni's husband Jamie, who works at the airport, tells Tosh that Annie had asked him about freight flights that had come into the islands. Angus is found dumped at the hospital, apparently drugged and muttering that "Bergen was right" about "experiments" happening at the facility. An argument between John and Patrick out on the boat leads to John accidentally hitting his other son Fergus on the head with a boat hook.
48	4	"Episode 4"	Ruth Paxton	Denise Paul	27 November 2024	5.13
Fergus is pronounced dead, and John is taken into custody. Patrick admits breaking into the Bett's house looking for money. Ruth and Tosh use the attack on Angus as an excuse to search the research lab and find evidence that Dr Mohan was conducting illegal embryonic stem cell experiments on Astrid. Astrid escapes from her family and goes to Nathan for help getting off the island. He hides her on a lorry about to leave on a ferry for Aberdeen, but she collapses and is taken to hospital. It is discovered that Anton was trying to get Astrid to her mother in Estonia, and Annie was helping him. Stefan and Dr Mohan will face charges over the experiments, but Stefan's car GPS shows he was nowhere near the croft when Annie and Bergen were killed. Tosh learns from her friend Tara that Annie seemed to recognise the Jakobsons when she saw them. Ruth calls a friend in the intelligence services about Professor Rossi and is told he is dangerous, as Rossi collects a gun from a locker.
49	5	"Episode 5"	Ruth Paxton	Paul Logue	4 December 2024	5.20
Ruth and Tosh realise Professor Rossi has been carrying out his own investigation and is probably after Annie's killer. They meet Ruth's intelligence contact, Rob Harding, who reveals Annie was previously shot in 2013 during a failed attempt to arrest someone selling secrets, for which she was blamed and discharged. Believing Stefan's wife Karin to be both the traitor and Annie's killer, Professor Rossi abducts and intends to shoot her. Ruth and Tosh arrive and take them both into custody. Rossi admits he was to blame for the failed sting, having left Annie alone so he could take drugs. Phone and internet records show Karin was at home when Annie was killed. MI5 will investigate whether she was the one leaking secrets. Ian asks Ruth for help when Noah has nightmares. Cora learns that the same gun from the killings was used in a drive-by shooting in Manchester. The prime suspect for that shooting, Kyle Frost, is in Shetland. Tosh and Sandy arrest him, but he was DJing at a party the night of the murders. Sandy learns Kyle is friends with Lisa.
50	6	"Episode 6"	Ruth Paxton	Paul Logue	11 December 2024	5.31
Alan convinces Lisa to talk to Ruth and Tosh. She tells them Michael Stack, the husband of Ian's sister Noreen, raped her one night at the refuge where she was staying. She told Annie the day she died, and Annie took Kyle's gun away from her. Michael is arrested on suspicion of the murders. His alibi for the assault falls apart, as he lets slip that something happened with Lisa. Ian and Noreen take Noah to the croft to try and cure his nightmares, with Ruth following. CCTV footage shows Noreen was near the party Annie attended the night she died. (Her lizard-patterned coat has been a feature of Noah's nightmares.) Ruth confronts Noreen, who confesses that Annie told her about Lisa's accusation of Michael and was going to the police. She followed her to the croft and, on seeing the gun, impulsively killed Annie and Anton. Noreen is charged with murder, and the evidence against Michael is passed to the procurator fiscal. Ian and Noah decide to leave the islands for a fresh start.

=== Series 10 (2025) ===
No. overall	No. in series	Title	Directed by	Written by	Original release date	UK viewers (millions)
51	1	"Episode 1"	Ruth Paxton	Paul Logue	5 November 2025	5.23
Ruth and Tosh carry out a drugs raid on a fishing boat on the information of young informer Will Louden, but they find nothing and Louden disappears. In the small village of Lunniswick, elderly Eadie Tulloch is found dead by her neighbour Colin Waite, her body tied up and strangled behind the house and left there for days. A retired social worker, she was an old friend of Billy's and the widow of his colleague Robert. Among those the police speak to are her estranged son Ed, close neighbors the Jameson/Mair family, the Burnett family who were staying at a holiday cottage with father Chris saying he saw someone in her garden, and David Powell, a young neighbour who recently served six months for house breaking. David has Eadie's jewellery in his room, but he says she gave it to him as payment for putting tiles in her bathroom and mentioned putting her affairs in order. A check of her bank records shows Eadie had £400,000 in savings that she never touched and of which Ed claims he was unaware. Lana Mair, who has dementia, sets fire to Eadie's house.
52	2	"Episode 2"	Ruth Paxton	Phil Mulryne	12 November 2025	5.17
Ruth and Tosh try to interview Lana, but she becomes so confused and upset that the interview is halted. Ed tells Ruth that Eadie's son Craig and Lana's son Ally drowned together while fishing in a storm. Cora finds Eadie had been drinking heavily before she died. Lana's husband Arthur admits he and Eadie had an affair, which he ended five years ago when Lana was diagnosed. He went to see Eadie with some food and a bottle of whisky the night she died and claims she was fine when he left. Billy's wife Morag, who worked with Eadie, tells Tosh that an Amy Shannon was suing social services. Eadie removed her and her sister Stevie from their birth mother, but while Amy was adopted locally, Stevie was sent to Aberdeen and grew up in foster care and children's homes. She now is staying with Amy and her family. Sandy learns that Stevie was suspected of manipulating other children while in care. Ruth runs into Louden, who says the drugs are being smuggled onto the island another way. Chris finds that his wife Hayley has brought drugs onto the island to help pay off a debt to the Callaghan crime gang.
53	3	"Episode 3"	Ruth Paxton	Paul Logue	19 November 2025	4.82
Chris and Hayley try to deliver the drugs to a courier, but Colin comes out of his croft to see what's happening and scares him off. Ruth gets background details on the Mairs from her brother Alan. Their daughter Isobel Jameson and her husband Tom moved back with the Mairs after Tom had to give up work because of a heart condition. Their daughter Jess is pregnant by a local boy, Ethan Stone, who Tom has ordered to stay away. Tosh learns someone answering Stevie's description took a taxi to Lunniswick and suspects she was the person Chris saw at Eadie's. Chris insists that person was not Stevie, but later Stevie admits to Amy that she had gone there. When Colin finds the drugs that the Burnetts hid in a shed outside their cottage, Hayley strikes him over the head with a rock. He is found by Jess and Ethan and tells them that Hayley is the one who attacked him. The Burnetts try to flee the island but are arrested at the ferry terminal. Sandy begins to suspect that Eadie's large savings were actually deposited by her late husband Robert, a police officer, probably indicating that he was corrupt. Billy, who worked with Robert, appears to have removed evidence.
54	4	"Episode 4"	Ruth Carney	Denise Paul	26 November 2025	4.67
Ruth asks Louden to find out the identity of the Burnetts' contact. He is brought to the attention of the contact, Lewis Mitchell, who later observes him talking with Ruth. Stevie is brought in for questioning, but denies going to Eadie's. She is identified as having made a false report to social services about Amy and her husband. She invades Morag's house, confronts her about separating the two sisters and breaks down in tears in Morag's arms. Fingerprint evidence rules her out as Eadie's killer. Ethan's mother Margaret requests assault charges on Tom for attacking Ethan, who tells her and Ruth that Jess spoke to Eadie about having the baby adopted. Tosh and Sandy look into a missing page of the statements from Eadie's account. David's mother Gina tells Tosh that Robert stopped her giving her husband Ray an alibi for the robbery he was jailed for by threatening to have Eadie take David away from her. Tosh receives a replacement copy of the missing page, which shows that Robert gave Billy £10,000. Mitchell contacts Louden asking him to meet him, and Louden notifies Ruth. She arrives late to find Louden has been injected with an overdose of drugs.
55	5	"Episode 5"	Ruth Carney	Paul Logue	3 December 2025	4.78
Tosh asks Billy about the missing page and the payment to him; he claims it was a loan that he repaid in full. Louden is in a coma in hospital. Ruth and Sandy discover that Mitchell rang him shortly beforehand. Fingerprint evidence shows Tom was in Eadie's house. Tosh arrests him and tries to goad him into giving a confession. He admits that Eadie told him about Jess' plan to have the baby adopted. Tosh tells Isobel, who tells Tom to leave. Ruth learns from Ed that Eadie didn't get on with Colin's mother. Billy tells Tosh that, after Craig and Ally went missing in the storm, he found the wreck of their boat was full of heroin. He and Robert covered it up, and he left Robert to get rid of the drugs. He doesn't know where the Tulloch's money came from. Ruth and Ed get holed up in her house during a storm. Sandy and Alex track down Mitchell, who offers them the name of the head of the drugs ring in Shetland.
56	6	"Episode 6"	Ruth Carney	Paul Logue	10 December 2025	5.17
Sandy calls Ruth to tell her that Mitchell has named Ed, with whom she just spent the night, as the man that tried to kill Louden. Ed briefly holds Ruth captive until Tosh arrives with back-up. He eventually admits to being present but says it was Mitchell that gave Louden the injection. He also claims he was pressured into replacing his father, Robert, in doing favours for the drug gang. Jess and Ethan try to flee the island, but their car crashes in a storm, and Jess goes into labour. Tom and Isobel find them and get them to hospital, where Jess has a baby boy. Ed's comment about when watching Craig and Ally head out the night before the storm leads Ruth recognize that Eadie let slip in her interview with Colin that she saw Craig and Ally go out the morning of the storm. She and Tosh initially suspect Isobel, to whose account the video had been downloaded, but she says Jess downloaded the interview for Arthur. They confront Arthur who explains Eadie admitted that a boat belonging to the drug gang had been stranded during the storm. On Robert's instruction, she sent Craig and Ally back out into the storm to collect the drugs, leading to their deaths. Arthur killed her in retaliation, leaving her facing where the boat had gone down. He is charged with murder. Ruth visits a recovering Louden. Billy tells Tosh he has confessed everything to Standards and is on leave while he awaits their decision.

=== Series 11 (2026) ===
This is the eleventh and final series to star Alison O'Donnell as DI Alison 'Tosh' McIntosh.

No. overall	No. in series	Title	Directed by	Written by	Original release date	UK viewers (millions)
57	1	"Episode 1"	Ruth Carney	Paul Logue	12 November 2026	TBA
When human remains are found in a car dredged from the sea, Calder and Tosh must find the troubled owner who fled the Isles nine years ago.
58	2	"Episode 2"	Ruth Carney	Paul Logue	19 November 2026	TBA
With the identity of the body confirmed, Calder digs into the theft from the surgery. But everything is put on hold when the team realises Tosh is missing.
59	3	"Episode 3"	Ruth Carney	Anita Vettesse	26 November 2026	TBA
Graeme’s life is turned upside down. The team digs into Paddy Rose, who blames Linden for his father’s death. Jonah turns against his mother.
60	4	"Episode 4"	Jonny Blair	Anita Vettesse	3 December 2026	TBA
Calder must test Paddy’s theory that Linden harmed his patients. Sandy reels from the attack on Donald. Graeme’s world is upended by an accusation from Peter.
61	5	"Episode 5"	Jonny Blair	Paul Logue	10 December 2026	TBA
Sandy rushes to find Donald, while Calder visits Yell to get the truth from Ronnie. Graeme takes matters into his own hands to protect Emily.

== Soundtracks ==
Soundtrack name	Composer	Release Date	Series
Shetland (Original Televison Soundtrack)	John Lunn	23 March 2018	Series 1-4
Shetland (Music from Series 5-8)	John Lunn	15 December 2023	Series 5-8

== Home media ==
Released on DVD in Australia, Shetland, Series 1 consists of the pilot "Red Bones" and the Series 2 episodes "Raven Black", "Dead Water" and "Blue Lightning". Series 2 contains the Series 3 episodes, Series 3 contains the Series 4 episodes, and Series 4 contains the Season 5 episodes.

On Australian Region 4 DVD, The Pilot episode is stated as being Pilot and not Series 1, with the Series 2 episodes being stated as Series 1. Quote from the DVD "This DVD set includes the Pilot Red Bones and all episodes from series one Raven Black, Dead Water and Blue Lightning". However, the UK releases are Series 1 through 7 rather than Series 1 through 6 in Australia.

DVD name	Region 2 (UK)	Region 4
Shetland	7 May 2014	17 September 2014
Shetland: Series 2	7 May 2014	11 May 2016
Shetland: Series 3	7 March 2016	7 August 2019
Shetland: Series 1–3	7 March 2016	N/A
Shetland: Series 4	26 March 2018	9 May 2018
Shetland: Series 1–4	26 March 2018	N/A
Shetland: Series 5	15 April 2019	6 April 2022
Shetland: Series 1–5	15 April 2019	N/A
Shetland: Series 6	13 December 2021	TBA
Shetland: Series 1–6	13 December 2021	N/A
Shetland: Series 7	19 September 2022	N/A
Shetland: Series 1–7	19 September 2022	N/A
Shetland: Series 8	22 January 2024	N/A
Shetland: Series 1-8	22 January 2024	N/A
Shetland: Series 9	10 February 2025	N/A
Shetland: Series 1-9	10 February 2025	N/A
Shetland: Series 10	9 February 2026	N/A
Shetland: Series 1-10	9 February 2026	N/A

== Accolades ==
Year	Award	Category	Recipient(s) and nominee(s)	Result	Ref.
2013	RTS Craft & Design Awards	Best Music – Original Title	John Lunn	Nominated	
2014	BAFTA Scotland	Best Actor – Television	Douglas Henshall	Nominated	
2015	BAFTA Scotland	Best Television Drama	Shetland	Nominated	
2016	British Society of Cinematographers	GBTC Operators Award – Television Drama	Rodrigo Gutierrez	Nominated	
2016	BAFTA Scotland	Best Television Drama	Shetland	Won	
2016	BAFTA Scotland	Best Actor – Television	Douglas Henshall	Won	
2016	BAFTA Scotland	Best Directing – Film/Television	Jan Matthys	Nominated	
2016	BAFTA Scotland	Best Writer – Film/Television	Gaby Chiappe	Nominated	
2018	BAFTA Scotland	Best Actor – Television	Douglas Henshall	Nominated	
2018	BAFTA Scotland	Best Writer – Film/Television	David Kane	Nominated	
2018	BAFTA Scotland	Best Television – Scripted	Shetland	Nominated	
2022	BAFTA Scotland	Best Director – Fiction	Max Myers	Nominated	
2024	BAFTA Scotland	Television – Scripted	Shetland	Nominated	
2025	BAFTA Scotland	Audience Award	Ashley Jensen	Nominated	
