= M.I. High =

British children's TV series

- Genre: Action; Espionage thriller Crime; School Spies
- Created by: Keith Brumpton
- Directed by: Richard Mark Elson; Toby Haynes; Simon Hook; Mat King; Zam Salim
- Starring: Rachel Petladwala; Moustafa Palazli; Bel Powley; Danny John-Jules; Benjamin Kerfoot; Charlene Osuagwu; Oyiza Momoh; Sam Strike; Oscar Jacques; Natasha Watson; Julia Brown; Jonny Freeman
- Country of origin: United Kingdom
- Original language: English
- No. of series: 7
- No. of episodes: 88 (list of episodes)

Production
- Producer: Alison Jackson
- Running time: 30 minutes approx.
- Production company: Kudos

Original release
- Network: CBBC
- Release: 8 January 2007 – 30 March 2014

M.I. High is a British action television series produced by Kudos for CBBC and created by Keith Brumpton. The series focused on a team of undercover teenage spies working for the fictional British secret intelligence agency MI9 who had to balance their school life with their jobs as secret agents. The line-up of spies was altered between the show's seven series.

The series premiered on 8 January 2007 and originally ended on 21 March 2011 after five series, before being revived for a further two series that were broadcast between 7 January 2013 and 31 March 2014.

== Premise ==
The series follows the adventures of secondary school pupils who work as undercover spies. The spies are led by an MI9 agent (first by Lenny Bicknall, later by Frank London) whose cover job is a school caretaker. The team must constantly save the world from domination by a variety of villains, whilst hiding their spy identities from their teachers and peers, and completing their school work. The identity of the overarching villains the Grand Master (Series 1–5) and the Mastermind (Series 6–7) remains a mystery within the show.

== Cast ==
Series one and two cast from left: Rose, Blane and Daisy.

=== Main ===
Series three to five cast from left: Carrie, Oscar and Rose.

==== M.I. High agents ====
Series seven cast from left Keri, Dan, Aneisha & Tom

M.I. High agents
Character	Portrayed by	Series
Daisy Millar	Bel Powley	1–2
Blane Whittaker	Moustafa Palazli	1–2
Rose Gupta	Rachel Petladwala	1–5
Oscar Cole	Ben Kerfoot	3–5
Carrie Stewart	Charlene Osuagwu	3–5
Aneisha Jones	Oyiza Momoh	6–7
Dan Morgan	Sam Strike	6–7
Tom Tupper	Oscar Jacques	6–7
Zoe	Natasha Watson	6
Keri Summers	Julia Brown	7

- Lenny Bicknall (Danny John-Jules), the team's MI9 handler working undercover as the school's caretaker (Series 1–2).
- Frank London (Jonny Freeman), who replaces Lenny as the team's MI9 handler working undercover as the school's caretaker (Series 3–7).

=== Supporting ===
==== Saint Hope's/Saint Heart's School Staff ====
- Kenneth Flatley (Chris Stanton), the Headmaster of Saint Hope's (Series 1–5) and of Saint Heart's (Series 6–7). He is unaware of the spying activities along with much else that happens in the school.
- Hermione King (Chanelle Owen), the Deputy Headmistress of Saint Hope's (Series 3–5) and of Saint Heart's (Series 7), who often undermines Mr. Flatley resulting in him seemingly being afraid of her.

==== Antagonists ====
- The Grand Master (voiced by Kerry Shale (Series 1), played and voiced by Julian Bleach (Series 2–6), the head of the Super Kriminal Underworld League (SKUL). Owns a white rabbit which he refers to as General Flopsy.
- The Mastermind (voiced by Brian Cox (Series 6), Gavin Mitchell (Series 7), the dictatorial head of KORPS, whose consciousness was digitally uploaded to cheat death.
- The Crime Minister (Pollyanna McIntosh), The Mastermind's second-in-command (Series 6-7). She is generally seen in command of KORPS due to the Mastermind's condition.

== Episodes ==
Season	Episodes	Original air dates	
Season	Episodes	Series premiere	Series finale
1	10	8 January 2007	5 March 2007
2	13	7 January 2008	24 March 2008
3	13	5 January 2009	30 March 2009
4	13	4 January 2010	15 March 2010
5	13	10 January 2011	21 March 2011
6	13	7 January 2013	25 March 2013
7	13	13 January 2014	31 March 2014

== Awards and nominations ==
Year	Ceremony	Category	Outcome	Notes
2008	Royal Television Society	Best Children's Drama	Won	
2009	Royal Television Society	Best Children's Drama	Nomination	

== Merchandise ==
=== Books ===
Books have been released including three novels, a survival handbook and a 2012 annual.

- M. I. High: A New Generation (31 January 2008, 978-0-14-132361-9, Puffin Books)
- M. I. High: Secrets & Spies (31 January 2008, 978-0-14-132362-6, Puffin Books)
- MI High: Spy Survival Handbook (31 January 2008, 978-0-14-132363-3, Puffin Books)
- M.I. High Annual 2012 (1 August 2011, 978-1-4052-5972-9, Egmont Books Ltd)

A further novel, M.I. High: The Midas Machine, was cancelled.

=== Comic ===
M.I. High comics
Release name	Release date	Author	Publisher	Notes	Ref
Totally... M.I. High	27 January 2011(UK)	Caryn Jenner	Titan Magazines	Included free poster, UV Pen and Notepad.	

=== DVD release ===
The first series of M.I. High was scheduled to be released on DVD in two five-episode installments by the Contender Entertainment Group, under license from the BBC. The first of which was released on 21 January 2008 and the second which would complete the first season was to follow on 31 March 2008 but was cancelled indefinitely with no reason given, and the rest of the show has not seen a DVD release yet. The first DVD includes a documentary about the series (which is made up of various short clips shown during the series on CBBC Extra).

M.I. High DVD releases
DVD release name	Episodes	Years of series	UK release date (Region 2)	Australian release date (Region 4)
M.I High: Series 1 Vol 1	S1 Ep. 1–5	2007	21 January 2008	2 March 2010
