= Fort Solis =

2023 video game

- Developers: Fallen Leaf; Black Drakkar Games
- Publisher: Dear Villagers
- Director: James Tinsdale
- Producer: Max Barton
- Designer: Piotr Kurkowski
- Programmer: Simon Bratel
- Artist: Mark Cushley
- Writer: James Tinsdale
- Composer: Ted White
- Engine: Unreal Engine 5
- Platforms: PlayStation 5; Windows; macOS; Xbox Series X/S
- Release: PlayStation 5, Windows; August 22, 2023; macOS; October 26, 2023; Xbox Series X/S; December 19, 2025
- Genres: Horror, adventure
- Mode: Single-player

Fort Solis is a 2023 horror adventure game developed by Fallen Leaf and Black Drakkar Games and published by Dear Villagers. Set in 2080, the story follows Jack Leary, an engineer who arrives at the titular Martian mining station after an emergency alert is activated. The game is played from a third-person perspective, with the player exploring the station and interacting with objects. At certain segments, the player controls Jack's colleague, Jessica Appleton.

The game was conceived at the beginning of the COVID-19 pandemic, aiming to adapt the cinematic style of streaming television to the video game format. The developers intended for the narrative to reflect real-world issues, such as the pandemic, as an example of human vulnerability and hostile environments. Roger Clark, Julia Brown, and Troy Baker provided the motion capture and voices for Jack, Jessica, and Wyatt Taylor, respectively.

Fort Solis was released for PlayStation 5 and Windows in August 2023. A macOS version was released later in October. A version for Xbox Series X/S was also released in December 2025. The game received mixed critical reception, with praise directed at its cast performances, visuals, and sound design; reviewers were ambiguous towards the narrative and criticized the gameplay. Fallen Leaf partnered with Studios Extraordinaires to develop film and television series based on Fort Solis.

== Gameplay ==
Fort Solis is described by Fallen Leaf as a psychological thriller, while video game publications referred to it as a horror and adventure game. Played from a third-person perspective, it is presented without camera cuts or loading screens. The player controls engineer Jack Leary, with two segments featuring his colleague, Jessica Appleton, and traverses the titular Martian station where an emergency alert has been activated. The station is divided into nine interconnected sections, consisting of both surface structures and underground levels connected by tunnels; the player can use a rover to traverse the surface. During exploration, the player finds key cards to open new sections, solves puzzles, and uncovers various logs, expanding the information about the game world. The player uses a handheld device to interact with the environment, such as picking locks or hacking doors. The game also features quick time events at specific points in the story.

== Plot ==
As maintenance technicians Jack Leary (Roger Clark) and Jessica Appleton (Julia Brown) prepare for an oncoming storm at the Martian colony, Fort Minor, they receive an emergency alert from a nearby mining station, Fort Solis. Traveling to investigate, Leary finds the station on lockdown with no sign of the crew. His exploration is initially limited by the lockdown and his lack of security credentials. As he ventures further into the station, he encounters bloodstains and signs suggesting he is not alone. Eventually, Leary discovers the corpses of several Fort Solis crew members, each bearing stab wounds. At the maintenance bay, where Leary attempts to restart the power generators, he is attacked by Wyatt Taylor (Troy Baker), Fort Solis's medical officer. Appleton, who has maintained radio contact with Leary, travels to Fort Solis. Upon arrival, she encounters Taylor but escapes his attack and begins searching for Leary. As Appleton explores the station, Taylor uses the radio to taunt her, attempting to lure her to the greenhouse. During her search, she discovers the bodies of the remaining crew members, all seemingly murdered.

Through video and audio logs left by the crew, Leary and Appleton uncover the events leading to the Fort Solis lockdown. A growth accelerant caused widespread death among the plants in the station's greenhouse. Taylor discovered that growing plants and food in Martian soil infected them with a virus that spreads to humans upon consumption. When crew members began exhibiting symptoms, Taylor alerted the agency overseeing Fort Solis, but they ignored his warnings and suspended him. Seeking to contain the outbreak and prevent it from reaching Earth, Taylor began killing his colleagues. Eventually, Appleton finds Taylor with an unconscious Leary at the greenhouse. Noticing her trembling hands, a symptom of the virus, Taylor inflicts a severe wound on Appleton. Leary regains consciousness and attempts to bring Appleton to safety, but Taylor catches up to them, killing Appleton as she seals an airlock to allow Leary to escape. Leary walks through the storm outside to another building, where he has a final confrontation with Taylor. Although Taylor injures Leary, arriving agency forces, responding to the alarm at Fort Solis, shoot Taylor dead. In an alternate ending, Taylor catches Leary outside in the storm. They mortally wound each other during the confrontation and both die, either from blood loss or suffocation due to breaches in their spacesuits.

A voicemail recording played during the post-credit scene reveals Taylor contacting his wife on Earth before killing his colleagues. He instructs her not to open a plant he sent home from the station and offers his final goodbye to his wife and daughters. The scene implies that this message arrived too late, and his family has already been affected by the virus.

== Development and release ==
Fort Solis was conceived in the early months of the COVID-19 pandemic. Game director James Tinsdale, inspired by his experience watching streaming television during that time, envisioned adapting this cinematic narrative style into a video game format. Tinsdale, formerly of Asobo Studio, initiated the project with art director Mark Cushley, who had previously worked at Evolution Studios and Traveller's Tales. They were later joined by senior technical animator Matt Lake and producer Max Barton. After six months of development, the team secured investment, allowing their studio, Fallen Leaf, to expand to a staff of ten across Liverpool and Warsaw. This expansion facilitated the outsourcing of certain development aspects to Black Drakkar Games, a Warsaw-based studio that added ten more staff members to the project. In 2023, they received funding through Epic Games' MegaGrant initiative.

Tinsdale stated that the game's narrative reflected real-world issues, as the pandemic exposed human vulnerability and a hostile environment. While the developers initially considered incorporating more horror elements, they ultimately opted for a "mystery thriller" to prioritize a character-driven story. Troy Baker, who portrayed lead officer Wyatt Taylor, said the game was pitched to him as a blend of Dead Space and Duncan Jones' 2009 film Moon. Tinsdale added that the team aimed to combine the psychological aspects of Jones' film with the "isolated, industrial style" of Dead Space. Other influences included the films Solaris (1972), The Thing (1982), and Sunshine (2007), as well as video games from Quantic Dream and Supermassive Games. The developers sought to make the game "dense and deep rather than wide" and as "unbloated as possible." They drew inspiration from streaming television series in aspects such as length and plot structure. Tinsdale explained: "We wanted to aim, in terms of retention, at people who watch Netflix, Apple TV, or Prime. For them, an eight-hour TV show is a big commitment [...] We looked at that and thought this game can't go over five hours before the systems get boring."

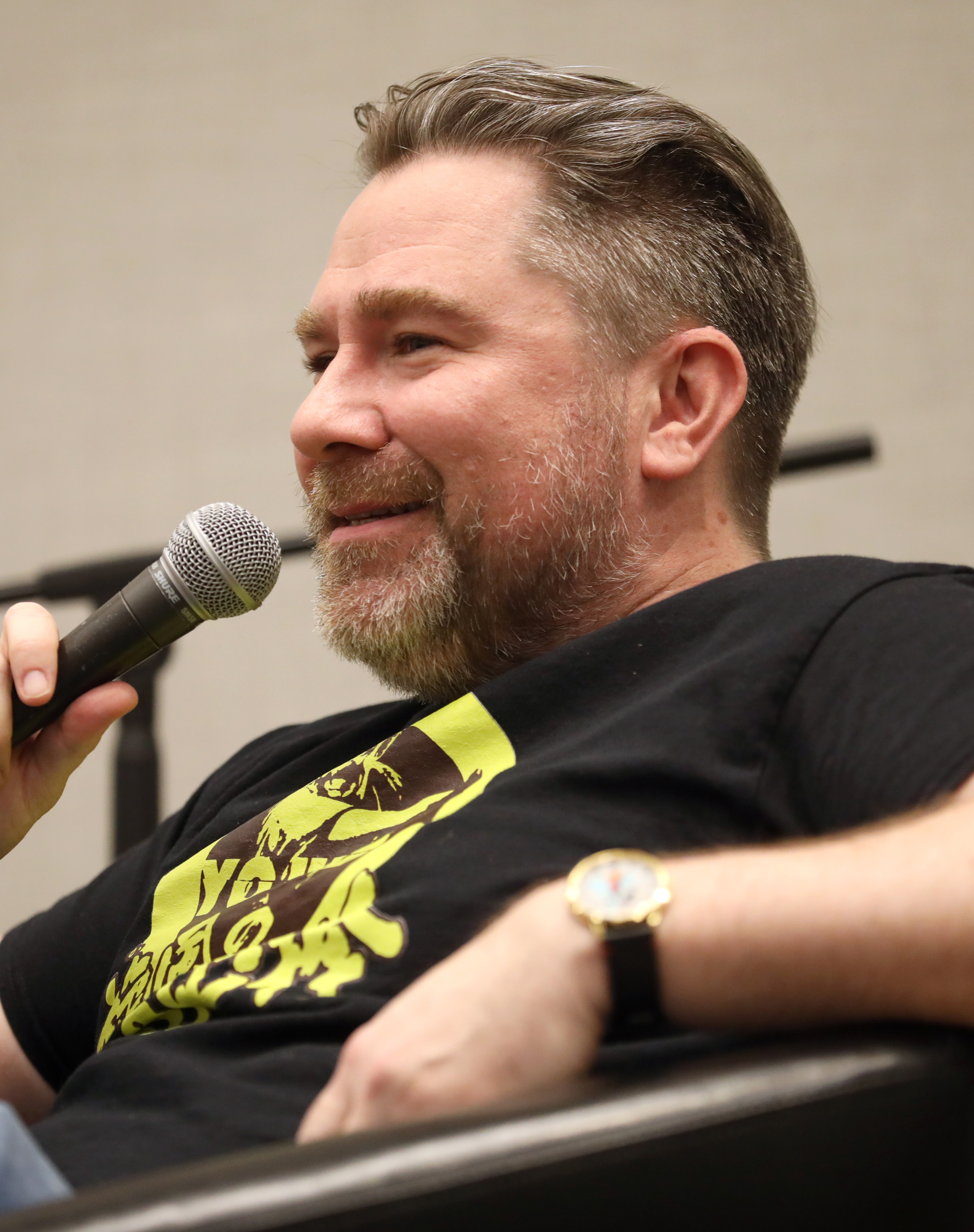
Roger Clark

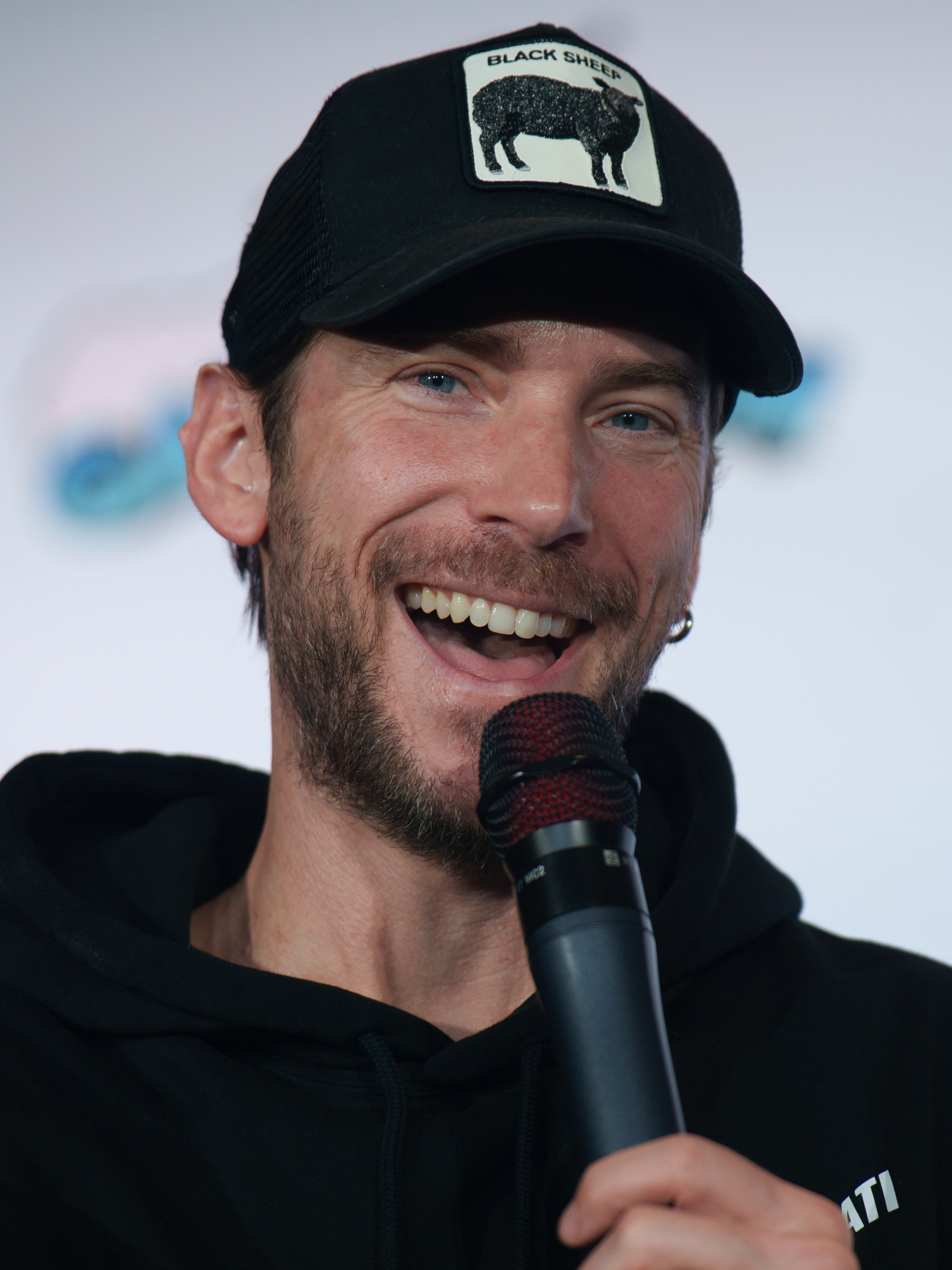
Troy Baker

Clark and Baker portrayed Jack Leary and Wyatt Taylor, respectively.

Roger Clark, known for his portrayal of Arthur Morgan in Red Dead Redemption 2 (2018), was cast as Jack Leary. The development team chose Clark based on his theater background and his performance as Morgan, while Clark saw the role as an opportunity to explore a different character archetype. Julia Brown, for whom Fort Solis was her first game project, portrayed Jessica Appleton, Jack's colleague. Appleton's appearance was based on that of Brown. The dynamic between Jack and Jessica was inspired by the characters Henry and Delilah from the video game Firewatch (2016). Baker accepted the role of Wyatt because he was interested in the story and wanted to work with Clark. Tinsdale described Wyatt as "probably the most complex and biggest character in the game." The actors performed motion capture and voice work, and they were allowed to improvise and adapt elements of their characters.

The developers prioritized narrative and atmosphere over game mechanics, opting to remove elements they considered unnecessary to the story. Although initially conceived as a first-person experience, the game transitioned to a third-person perspective to better facilitate the intended design of continuous gameplay featuring long takes. The team implemented "key sequences," cinematic story moments with quick time events (QTEs) inspired by God of War (2018) and The Last of Us Part II (2020), which allowed the player to maintain character control. These sequences were designed to "enforce player choice; we didn't want players to just do a QTE where the result would be almost formulaic." Fort Solis was developed using Unreal Engine 5, and the developers utilized Nvidia's Omniverse Audio2Face technology for facial animations. The visual design philosophy aimed for a grounded and "gritty" futuristic aesthetic, taking inspiration from the television series The Expanse (2019–2022).

Fort Solis was announced in June 2022 at the Summer Game Fest with a debut trailer presented by Clark and Baker. In March 2023, journalists were given a hands-on demonstration at the Game Developers Conference and PAX East. In June, a special edition containing a digital artbook and soundtrack, also included in the physical PlayStation 5 edition, was announced. The game was released on August 22 for PlayStation 5 and Windows. In October, a limited physical edition for PlayStation 5 was made available in Europe, and a macOS version was released later that month. An Xbox version is currently in development. In December, it was announced that Fallen Leaf partnered with Studios Extraordinaires to develop film and television series based on Fort Solis.

== Reception ==
Reception

Aggregate scores
Aggregator	Score
Metacritic	PS5: 60/100 (Note: Based on 40 scored reviews of 42 total reviews); Win: 56/100 (Note: Based on 18 scored reviews of 19 total reviews)
OpenCritic	35% (Note: Based on 70 reviews)

Review scores
Publication	Score
Adventure Gamers	2/5
Eurogamer	2/5
GameSpot	7/10
GamesRadar+	2.5/5
PC Gamer (US)	40/100
Play	5/10
Push Square	5/10
Shacknews	6/10

Fort Solis received "mixed or average" reviews from critics, according to review aggregator Metacritic, and 35% of critics recommended the game, according to OpenCritic. It was praised for cast performances, visuals, and sound design; reviewers had mixed responses to the narrative and criticized the gameplay. Mark Delaney of GameSpot wrote that the game's strengths generally outweighed its weaknesses. Josh West of GamesRadar+ felt that it was an ambitious debut project, albeit lacking in individuality. Tauriq Moosa of Polygon compared playing Fort Solis to watching a 4K video on YouTube due to its limited interactivity. Joe Parlock of TheGamer called it "all presentation and no substance," adding that "it's insulting how utterly mediocre it is when its cast and setting had so much promise." John Bales of PC Gamer was also disappointed, writing that "if Fort Solis really was a Netflix series, it wouldn't get a second season."

GameSpot's Delaney found the plot intriguing and engaging, praising cast performances, particularly those of Clark and Brown. While Emma Kent of Eurogamer and Larryn Bell of Shacknews appreciated the opening parts of the story, they noted that it loses clarity over time and that the ending felt rushed. Ashley Bardan of Kotaku described the story as "too bovine and garbled" and wrote that Jessica's character was underdeveloped. However, Bardan lauded Baker's performance, noting that he "balanced camp and realism with a stage actor's meticulousness." Moosa of Polygon praised the supporting cast for bringing an organic and believable feeling to the dialogues but described the narrative as unconvincing, criticizing its linearity. Bales of PC Gamer stated that the developers failed to create a sense of suspense, deeming it one of the main shortcomings of Fort Solis, especially since it was promoted as a thriller. Parlock of TheGamer and Alyssa Hatmaker of Adventure Gamers praised the dialogues between Jack and Jessica, although Hatmaker found some of the conversations "a bit clichéd."

Reviewers criticized the game's diegetic interface, particularly the map, arguing that it made navigating the levels difficult. (Note: Attributed to multiple references:) Kent of Eurogamer found the QTEs poorly implemented and felt they created "the illusion of choice," while Abbie Stone of Play noted that the QTEs lacked any noticeable impact on the narrative. Bell of Shacknews argued that the QTEs negatively affected immersion, especially during intense sequences. She also found that the lack of a run option made movements "tedious and misplaced" as the game progressed, and occasionally "cumbersome and imprecise." Jakob Hansen of Gamereactor stated that this mechanic made exploring the environments less interesting, and Aaron Bayne of Push Square considered the combination of slow pacing and dynamic cutscenes "jarring." Several reviewers criticized the game's implementation of walking simulator elements, with Parlock of TheGamer stating that Fort Solis "dragged the genre back ten years with its dated, frustrating state of being."

Moosa of Polygon praised the visual design, highlighting its "retro sci-fi aesthetic and liminal spaces." Both Bales of PC Gamer and Bayne of Push Square commended the animations and lighting. Edwin Evans-Thirlwell of Rock Paper Shotgun lauded the character models. Bell of Shacknews emphasized that the graphics and animations were the game's key strengths, setting a higher standard for visual design, but criticized the limited graphics settings. Conversely, West of GamesRadar+ stated that the visual design seemed underdeveloped. Some reviewers noted technical issues, such as frame rate drops, crashes, and glitches. However, Hansen of Gamereactor praised the optimization, stating that he encountered no problems during his playthrough.
