= Angus Miller =

Scottish actor

- Born: Dundee, Scotland
- Education: Drama Centre London
- Occupation: Actor
- Years active: 2013–present

Angus Miller is a Scottish television, stage, film, and voice actor from Dundee. He is best known for his role as Donnie Russell in the BBC crime drama Shetland.

He has also appeared on stage in Britain and abroad at the National Theatre of Scotland, Royal Court Theatre, London, St. Ann's Warehouse, New York, the Royal Lyceum Theatre in Edinburgh, and the Bristol Old Vic.

== Career ==
Miller is best known for his 7-year role as Donnie Russell in the BBC crime drama, Shetland. He has also appeared as Michael Murray in Starz's Outlander and Colin Cunningham in Netflix’s Dept. Q.

Miller has extensive stage experiences, including notable performances in The Duchess of Malfi, Anna Karenina, and Dead Dad Dog. He has also worked in voice acting. He was a continuity announcer for STV from 2020 to 2024 and has voiced the character of Edwin Faulkner/Alec Reeves in the audio drama The Sojourn since 2024.

Miller has been cast in upcoming roles in Channel 4's Careless and Sky's Meantime.

== Critical reception ==
=== The Duchess of Malfi (2019) ===
In the 2019 production of The Duchess of Malfi at Royal Lyceum Theatre in Edinburgh, The Skinny remarked on his performance saying "Angus Miller offers a terrifyingly unpredictable performance as Ferdinand, with outbursts of anger that foreshadow his descent into madness”. WhatsOnStage said "Ferdinand, beautifully played by Angus Miller, is an overgrown baby who fetishizes his own childhood and doesn't understand the emotions unleashed in him by his sister" while The Telegraph considered that Miller's Ferdinand had "terrifying shades of Dennis Hopper".

=== Anna Karenina (2023) ===
In 2023, Miller played Stiva, the title character's brother in Anna Karenina at Royal Lyceum Theatre Edinburgh. Of his performance, The Times said “Miller is excellent as the feckless Stiva.”, while the North West End UK said "he brings with him a natural stage presence and is clearly a confident and skilled performer."The Stage found him particularly "funny, grinning, guffawing" as Stiva.

=== Dead Dad Dog (2023) ===
In 2023, Miller starred with Liam Brennan in the father and son play, Dead Dad Dog at the Finborough Theatre in London. The Arts Desk said “Miller is winningly charming as Eck.” Broadway Baby found that "Miller is immediately engaging and makes Eck into a very likeable character". ReviewsGate said the play elicits terrific performances from Angus Miller as Eck trying in vain to impress the... apparatchiks.

== Filmography includes ==
Year	Title	Role	Notes
2016–2017	Teacup Travels	Alexius / Teo / Exoidas / Cadmus / Dorian	CBeebies
2019–2026	Shetland	Donnie Russell	BBC, main cast, 28 episodes
2020	Doctors	Tim Partridge	BBC
2021	Guilt	Zack	BBC
2023	The Gold	Shuggie	BBC / Paramount+
2024	Outlander	Michael Murray	Starz / MGM+
2024–	The Sojourn	Edwin Faulkner / Alec Reeves	Audio Drama
2025	Leg of a Salesman	Henry	Short film, nominated for Best Actor in a Comedy, Kino Short Film Festival 2025
2025	Dept. Q	Colin Cunningham	Netflix, recurring role
2026	The Chief	Steve Duncan	BBC / The Comedy Unit
2026	Ted Lasso	Constable Jackson	Apple, recurring role

== Theatre credits include ==
Year	Title	Role	Venue(s)	Notes
2013–2017	Let the Right One In	Torkel / Janne / Jimmy	National Theatre of Scotland; Dundee Rep; Royal Court Theatre, London; Apollo Theatre, West End; St. Ann's Warehouse, New York; US Tour: McCullough Theatre, Austin; Moore Theatre, Seattle; Alley Theatre, Houston	Winner – South Bank Sky Arts Theatre Award 2014
2013	Macbeth	Malcolm	Perth Theatre; Tron Theatre, Glasgow	
2016–2017	Trainspotting	Sick Boy / Tommy	Citizens Theatre, Glasgow; Kings Theatre, Edinburgh	
2018	The Belle's Stratagem	Doricourt	Royal Lyceum Theatre, Edinburgh	Winner – CATS Award 2018
2019	The Duchess of Malfi	Ferdinand	Royal Lyceum Theatre, Edinburgh; Citizens Theatre, Glasgow	
2022	The Comedy of Errors	Antipholus of Syracuse / Antipholus of Ephesus	Citizens Theatre, Glasgow	
2023	Anna Karenina	Stiva	Royal Lyceum Theatre, Edinburgh; Bristol Old Vic	
2023	Dead Dad Dog	Eck	Finborough Theatre, London; Traverse Theatre, Edinburgh	
