= Raven Black =

2006 novel by Ann Cleeves

- Hardcover edition
- Author: Ann Cleeves
- Language: English
- Series: Shetland
- Genre: Crime Fiction
- Publisher: Pan, St. Martin's Minotaur (US)
- Publication place: United Kingdom
- Awards: 2006 CWA Gold Dagger
- ISBN: 978-1-4050-5472-0 (hardback)
- Followed by: White Nights

Raven Black is a 2006 novel by Ann Cleeves that won the Duncan Lawrie Dagger Award for the best crime novel of the year. Raven Black is the first in the "Shetland" mysteries, a series of eight novels by Cleeves, composed of two quartets, all set in Shetland.

== Plot ==
Raven Black is set in Shetland, an archipelago off the north coast of mainland Scotland. The novel opens with the death of a sixteen-year-old schoolgirl named Catherine Ross, whose body was discovered in a field on New Year's Day by Fran Hunter, an English artist staying in Shetland. Local police inspector, Jimmy Perez, leads the investigation into the death. Perez is directed in the investigation by a team of detectives from Inverness, led by Detective Inspector Roy Taylor. Initial suspicion is aimed at Magnus Tait, a mentally-challenged man living in the vicinity. Magnus Tait had previously been questioned in an old case involving the eight-year old disappearance of Catriona Bruce, a six-year-old child who lived near his house and often visited him to play. Tait was known to have been fond of her, as she was similar in age to his younger sister, who had died of an illness. Although Tait was never convicted, he was shunned locally and believed to be involved when she disappeared. Suspicions are raised when it is discovered that Catherine Ross and her friend Sally Henry had visited Tait shortly before Catherine was murdered. Tait keeps an injured raven as a pet in his house.

Catherine Ross' body was discovered by her neighbour, Fran Hunter. Fran, an English artist, had moved back to Shetland so that she could raise her young daughter Cassie with her ex-husband, Duncan Hunter, a Shetland businessman. Fran Hunter also finds out that Catherine Ross attended a party hosted by her ex-husband the night before she died, and reports this fact to Taylor and Perez. Despite local suspicions around Tait, Taylor and Perez interview a number of other people that they suspect of being involved. These include Catherine's friend Sally Henry, a lonely girl who was isolated and bullied before being befriended by Catherine; Duncan Hunter, who hosted the party that Catherine attended; Robert Isbister, a local playboy who is known to date younger women and reportedly spent time with Catherine at the party, and Catherine's male English teacher, who admits to being attracted to her and had kissed her a few months earlier after inviting her to his home on the pretext of offering her advice on reading.

Through these interviews and by talking with her father, they find out that Catherine had been making a documentary on Shetland for her project, and had filmed Tait talking about Catriona Bruce's disappearance, as well as taken extensive footage of local residents. They also learn that since her death, the documentary had gone missing, although her notes reveal that it was thematically inspired by Robert Frost's poem 'Fire and Ice'. Fran Hunter later also discovers the body of the missing child, Catriona Bruce, hidden among some rocks in a peat bog near Tait's house. Although Tait is subsequently arrested and charged with Catriona Bruce's murder, there is insufficient evidence to link him to Catherine Ross' disappearance. Taylor consequently decides to remain on Shetland and investigate further with Jimmy Perez. Finally, Perez discovers that Catherine's friend, Sally Henry, had been having an affair with local playboy Robert Isbister. After discovering that Catherine had obtained footage of Robert Isbister behaving rudely and violently striking Catherine for her documentary, Sally Henry strangled Catherine and left her body in the field, where it was picked over by ravens and discovered later by Fran Hunter. Sally is arrested after she kidnaps Fran Hunter's daughter, Cassie, during the Up Helly Aa festival, to prevent her from disclosing that she saw Sally with Catherine on the beach where Catherine was murdered. When Perez finds Cassie unharmed, he questions Sally, who confesses to killing Catherine, and planning to kill Cassie as well. Through interviews with Magnus Tait, they further learn that he didn't kill Catriona Bruce; Catriona Bruce was killed by Tait's mother, who was infuriated with Catriona after she discovered her playing with her dead daughter's belongings. Tait hid the body and followed his mother's instructions to never disclose the secret to anyone. While Tait was in custody, his pet raven, placed into the care of a local animal lover, also died.

== Characters ==
- Inspector Jimmy Perez: A detective with the Shetland police based in the main town of Lerwick, but originally from Fair Isle. Perez's family is believed to have descended from a Spanish sailor stranded on the islands after a boat capsized, who then married a local woman and settled in Shetland. Previously married and divorced after his wife suffered a miscarriage, Perez moved back to Shetland and bought a small house in Lerwick, and commands the local police force.
- Sergeant Sandy Wilson: A local police officer from Whalsay, who works with Perez.
- Fran Hunter: A former photographer turned artist, who moved with her young daughter Cassie to Shetland so that Cassie could spend time with Fran's ex-husband, a local businessman.
- Duncan Hunter: A local businessman from Shetland, who attended school with Jimmy Perez and used to be his close friend. His ex-wife Fran Hunter and daughter Cassie also live in Shetland.
- Catherine Ross: A student at Anderson High School in Shetland, who was murdered. Originally from England, she was known to be making a documentary on the island. Her father was the school principal.
- Sally Henry: A Shetland native and Catherine Ross's friend. Her mother was the principal at a primary school in Lerwick, and Sally was often bullied and isolated for being the teacher's daughter.
- Catriona Bruce: A young child who went missing in Shetland, several years before Catherine Ross was killed. She was known to be friendly with Magnus Tait and his mother.
- Magnus Tait: A middle-aged man from Shetland, who initially lived with his mother and later lived alone after her death. He was very fond of his younger sister Agnes, who died as a child as a result of illness. He was later friendly with Catriona Bruce, and was a suspect in her disappearance.
- Roy Taylor: A detective, originally from Liverpool and now based in Inverness, who directed the investigation into Catherine Ross' death.

== Major themes ==
Raven Black deals with themes of isolation and relationships, as they occur within a small, confined society. In a review in The Independent, critic Jane Jakeman wrote that Cleeves "...creates a convincing world of hostility against outsiders, of genuine ancient feuds but pseudo-history for the tourists, of small snobberies and major jealousies."

== Style ==
The style of writing in Raven Black has been compared to Nordic noir.

== Background ==
Cleeves has stated in an interview with The Scotsman that she conceived of the book while bird-watching in Lerwick, and consulted closely with local residents, including a Shetland police officer named Robert Gunn about the challenges of policing in the small, isolated community.

== Publication history ==
Raven Black was first published in the United Kingdom by Pan Macmillan, in 2006. It was published in the United States by St. Martin's Press. In 2018, it was published as an audiobook, narrated by Kenny Blyth.

== Reception ==
The book received was received largely positively, with The Independent describing the book as one that "...breaks the conventional mould of British crime-writing, while retaining the traditional virtues of strong narrative and careful plotting." Publishers Weekly described as a "...taut, atmospheric thriller, the first in a new series, will keep readers guessing until the last page." In 2009, Raven Black won the inaugural Duncan Lawrie Award (formerly the Gold Dagger Award), presented by the Crime Writers' Association, for the best crime novel of the year.

== Adaptations and translations ==
An Icelandic translation of Raven Black, by Snjólaug Bragadóttir, won an award for Icelandic translation in 2017. It has also been translated into Swedish and was shortlisted for the Martin Beck Award for crime fiction in translation for this translation.

Raven Black was adapted for radio in 2010, by Iain Finlay MacLeod, directed by Kirsteen Cameron and starring Grant O'Rourke as Jimmy Perez. This adaptation was praised by The Radio Times and aired again. It was also adapted in German for radio, and aired on SWR 2 Krimi (Südwestrundfunk).

The BBC adapted Raven Black for television in 2014, as the first and second episodes in the second series of Shetland, starring Douglas Henshall as Jimmy Perez and Brian Cox as Magnus Tait.
