= Alison O'Donnell (actress) =

Scottish actress (born 1980s)

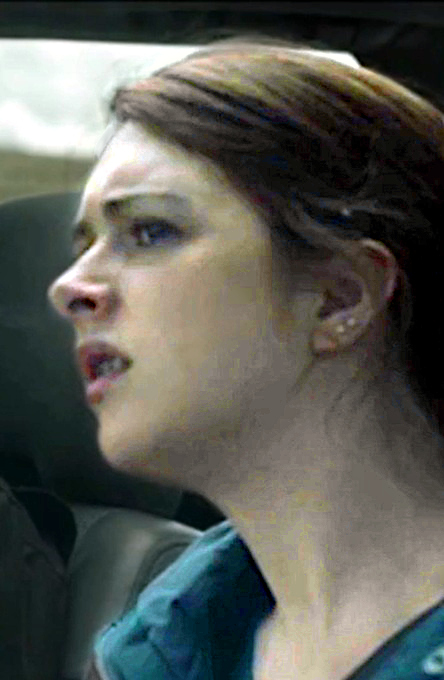
- O'Donnell in Shetland 2013
- Born: Motherwell, North Lanarkshire, Scotland
- Occupation: Actor
- Spouse: D.C. Jackson
- Children: 2

Alison O'Donnell is a Scottish actress. She is best known for her role as Detective Sergeant (later DI) Alison 'Tosh' McIntosh in Shetland (2013–present).

== Early life ==
O'Donnell was born in the early 1980s and grew up in Motherwell with two elder sisters. She initially studied international law at university but dropped out after three months to take up acting.

== Career ==
Early in her acting career O'Donnell mainly worked in theatre, featuring in productions of Boys, The Hard Man, Eigengrau, and Yerma. She had small roles in BBC television productions Feel the Force (2006) and Holby City (2012). She played a lead role in My Romantic History, a play at the Edinburgh Fringe which won the 2011 Fringe First award.

From 2013 to present, she has appeared in the main role of DS Alison 'Tosh' McIntosh in the Scottish television crime drama Shetland and is set to depart the series later this year.

In 2017, she was part of the cast of the BBC Radio 4 play Synonymous, which was written by her partner, D.C. Jackson.

== Personal life ==
O'Donnell's partner is Scottish playwright D.C. Jackson; they have two children. They met while O'Donnell was playing the lead role in Jackson's play My Romantic History at the Traverse in Edinburgh but became a couple only later.

== Filmography ==
Year	Title	Role	Notes
2006	Feel the Force	Zoo Shop Assistant	TV series; Series 1; Episode 3: "Wanted"
2012	Holby City	Wendy Weiss	TV series. Series 14; Episode 13: "Hide Your Love Away"
2013–present	Shetland	DC/DS/DI Alison 'Tosh' McIntosh	TV series. Main role. Series 1–11; 57 episodes
2014	Moomins on the Riviera	The Mymble's Daughter (voice)	Film (English version)
2019	Pet Sematary	Party Guest	Film
2020	Do No Harm	Kirsty	Short film
