= List of M.I. High episodes =

The following is an episode list for the television series M.I. High, a children's adventure programme on the UK TV channel CBBC.

== Series overview ==
Series	Episodes	Originally released	
Series	Episodes	First released	Last released
1	10	8 January 2007	5 March 2007
2	13	7 January 2008	24 March 2008
3	13	5 January 2009	30 March 2009
4	13	4 January 2010	15 March 2010
5	13	10 January 2011	21 March 2011
6	13	7 January 2013	25 March 2013
7	13	13 January 2014	31 March 2014

== Episodes ==
=== Series 1 (2007) ===
The BBC confirmed on 12 November 2006 that a 10 episodes series, lasting 30 minutes each, would be transmitted in early 2007 on CBBC channel. M.I. High was shown as part of the BBC's HD trial, available to viewers with HD services and was the first CBBC television program to be filmed and transmitted in High Definition.

The main cast was confirmed with Bel Powley, Moustafa Chousein-Oglou, and Rachel Petladwala playing child spies Daisy, Blane, and Rose respectively, with Danny John-Jules playing their handler Lenny.

No. overall	No. in series	Title	Villains	Directed by	Written by	Original release date
1	1	"The Sinister Prime Minister"	The Grand Master and The Guinea Pig	Toby Haynes	Keith Brumpton	8 January 2007
2	2	"Eyes on Their Stars"	Tony Frisco	Toby Haynes	Keith Brumpton	8 January 2007
3	3	"The Big Freeze"	Sonya Frost and The Grand Master	Toby Haynes	Nathan Cockerill	15 January 2007
4	4	"The Power Thief"	Brent Gilbert	Toby Haynes	Elly Brewer	22 January 2007
5	5	"Nerd Alert"	The Worm	Toby Haynes	Keith Brumpton	29 January 2007
6	6	"Super Blane"	Chad Turner and The Grand Master	Simon Hook	Nathan Cockerill	5 February 2007
7	7	"Spy Animals"	Silas Fenton and The Grand Master	Simon Hook	Nathan Cockerill	12 February 2007
8	8	"Forever Young"	Vanessa Zeitgeist and The Grand Master	Simon Hook	Keith Brumpton	19 February 2007
9	9	"Red Button Rampage"	General Ryan Scarp	Simon Hook	Nathan Cockerill & Elly Brewer	26 February 2007
10	10	"The Fugitive"	Air One and The Grand Master	Simon Hook	Keith Brumpton	5 March 2007

=== Series 2 (2008) ===
No. overall	No. in series	Title	Villains	Directed by	Written by	Original release date
11	1	"It's a Kind of Magic"	Leah Retsam and The Grand Master	Toby Haynes	Keith Brumpton, Nathan Cockerill	7 January 2008
12	2	"You Can Call Me Al"	A.L.L.E.N.	Toby Haynes	Ben Ward	7 January 2008
13	3	"Evil by Design"	Lorenzo Ferrago and The Grand Master	Toby Haynes	Nathan Cockerill	14 January 2008
14	4	"Fit Up"	Maximus Fiticus and The Grand Master	Toby Haynes	Keith Brumpton	21 January 2008
15	5	"Face Off"	Charlie 'Chuckers' Chuckworth	Toby Haynes	Nathan Cockerill	28 January 2008
16	6	"Big Sister"	Mary Taylor (AKA Big Sister)	Simon Hook	Katie Douglas, Keith Brumpton	4 February 2008
17	7	"The Cold War"	Gesundheit and The Grand Master	Simon Hook	Keith Brumpton	11 February 2008
18	8	"Nano Nits"	Nora Braithwaite and The Grand Master	Simon Hook,	Nathan Cockerill	18 February 2008
19	9	"The Others"	James Blonde	Zam Salim	Ben Ward	25 February 2008
20	10	"The Big Bling"	Reginald Lacey (AKA Mr. B)	Simon Hook	Nathan Cockerill	3 March 2008
21	11	"Spy Plane"	Irena Ryfield	Zam Salin	Nathan Cockerill	10 March 2008
22	12	"Greenfinger"	Charlie Darwin	Zam Salin	Keith Brumpton	17 March 2008
23	13	"Asteroid Attack"	Doctor Von Quark (AKA Reverend Nye)	Simon Hook	Keith Brumpton	24 March 2008

=== Series 3 (2009) ===
A third series was confirmed by the BBC 6 February 2008, with 13 episodes each lasting 30 minutes in length to transmit in 2009. It was confirmed that Rachel Petladwala would return as Rose Gupta, with new actors Charlene Osuagwu and Ben Kerfoot joining as characters Carrie and Oscar respectively, while Jonny Freeman would portray the team's new handler Frank London.

No. overall	No. in series	Title	Villains	Directed by	Written by	Original release date
24	1	"Art Attacks"	The Grand Master and Brian Gainsborough	Simon Hook	Keith Brumpton	5 January 2009
25	2	"The Mole"	Luke Withers	Simon Hook	Nathan Cockerill	12 January 2009
26	3	"Agent X"	The Grand Master	Simon Hook	Ben Ward	19 January 2009
27	4	"Mind Machine"	The Grand Master and fake Dr Wallis (SKUL Agent)	Simon Hook	Jeff Dodds	26 January 2009
28	5	"Dark Star"	Colt Winchester	Simon Hook	Jonny Kurzman	2 February 2009
29	6	"Fit to Wurst"	The Grand Master, Jed Black and Ivor	Mat King	Adrian Hewitt	9 February 2009
30	7	"The New Grand Master"	The Grand Master	Mat King	Nathan Cockerill	16 February 2009
31	8	"Think Tank"	Dr Leonard Vince	Mat King	Ben Ward	23 February 2009
32	9	"Family Tree"	The Uzhmani Group	Mat King	Keith Brumpton	2 March 2009
33	10	"The Glove"	Allanah Sucrose	Richard Elson	Jess Williams	9 March 2009
34	11	"The Visit"	Per Trollberger	Richard Elson	Keith Brumpton	16 March 2009
35	12	"Operation Flopsy"	The Grand Master	Mat King	Keith Brumpton and Ben Ward	23 March 2009
36	13	"Moontaker"	Venus Houston and The Grand Master	Richard Elson	Keith Brumpton	30 March 2009

=== Series 4 (2010) ===
No. overall	No. in series	Title	Villains	Directed by	Written by	Original release date
37	1	"Run Carrie Run"	The Grand Master	Mat King	Nathan Cockerill	4 January 2010
38	2	"The Bunny Whisperer"	The Grand Mistress (A.K.A. Anita Kane)	Simon Hook	Keith Brumpton and Ben Ward	4 January 2010
39	3	"Quakermass"	Well Fit Jim	Simon Hook	Ben Ward	11 January 2010
40	4	"Mrs. King - License To Spy"	Walter Bailey	Simon Hook	Jonny Kurzman	18 January 2010
41	5	"Don't Cook Now"	Waitress Brie, Sous Chef Elmer Pantry and The Grand Master	Mat King	Keith Brumpton and Nathan Cockerill	18 January 2010
42	6	"Return of the Mummy"	The Grand Master and Jade Dixon Halliday	Richard Elson	Keith Brumpton and Ben Ward	25 January 2010
43	7	"Doppelgängers"	Andrea Ivanovic	Simon Hook	Adrian Hewitt	1 February 2010
44	8	"High School Spy Movie"	Sydney Barbour	Richard Elson	Keith Brumpton and Ben Ward	8 February 2010
45	9	"Black Hole"	Terry Zucker	Richard Elson	Nathan Cockerill	15 February 2010
46	10	"Three Spies and a Baby"	The Grand Master	Mat King	Jonny Kurzman	22 February 2010
47	11	"Millionaire Flatley"	Dwayne Flatley	Mat King	Simon Hook	1 March 2010
48	12	"Skuldiggery"	Toby Bleach	Mat King	Keith Brumpton and Ben Ward	8 March 2010
49	13	"The Octopus"	The Octopus (A.K.A. Charlton London)	Richard Elson	Keith Brumpton	15 March 2010

=== Series 5 (2011) ===
No. overall	No. in series	Title	Villains	Directed by	Written by	Original release date
50	1	"Vote SKUL"	The Grand Master	Mat King	Ben Ward	10 January 2011
51	2	"The B Team"	The Grand Mistress	Mat King	Jonny Kurzman	10 January 2011
52	3	"Ghosts"	Crime	Mat King	Ben Ward	17 January 2011
53	4	"Total Eclipse"	The Grand Master and Egor	Richard Elson	Adrian Hewitt	24 January 2011
54	5	"The Gran Master"	Beryl 'The Beefcake' Bagshot, Beryl's Angels (George, Hilda and Vera)	Richard Elson	Nathan Cockerill	31 January 2011
55	6	"The Patient"	SKUL ninjas and Troy Greek	Mat King	Jonny Kurzman	7 February 2011
56	7	"The Crystal of St Helena"	Vincent Argyle and The Grand Master	Simon Hook	Adrian Hewitt	14 February 2011
57	8	"The Wasp"	Lady and Philip Blahga	Simon Hook	Simon Allen	21 February 2011
58	9	"Bully Elliot"	Elliot Cobbs	Simon Hook	Keith Brumpton and Simon Allen	28 February 2011
59	10	"Tim Brown's SKUL Days"	The Grand Master and Jade Dixon-Halliday	Simon Hook	Keith Brumpton and Nathan Cockerill	7 March 2011
60	11	"The First to Crack"	Quillian Pendrix and The Grand Master	Richard Elson	Nathan Cockerill	14 March 2011
61	12	"Day of the Jacket"	Dr Carla Baxter and Ivan Orfalkald	Richard Elson	Peter Kerry	21 March 2011
62	13	"The Lost Hero"	The Grand Master	Mat King	Nathan Cockerill	21 March 2011

=== Series 6 (2013) ===
After a 16-month break, M.I. High was renewed for a sixth series, with the M.I. High project having moved to the new setting of Saint Heart's school.

No. overall	No. in series	Title	Villains	Directed by	Written by	Original release date
63	1	"The Fall of SKUL" (Part 1)	The Grand Master	Simon Hynd; Richard Senior (title sequence)	Nathan Cockerill; Malcolm McGonigle (title sequence)	7 January 2013
Note: This episode was originally edited into a 55 minute special with Trojan KORPS.
64	2	"Trojan KORPS" (Part 2)	The Crime Minister and The Mastermind	Simon Hynd	Ben Ward	7 January 2013
Note: This episode was originally edited into a 55 minute special with The Fall of SKUL.
65	3	"Grosse Encounters"	fake Edwin Grosse, The Crime Minister and The Mastermind	Simon Hynd	Malcolm McGonigle	14 January 2013
66	4	"The Face Of Revenge"	Cuthbert Peabody	Richard Senior	Nathan Cockerill	25 February 2013 (Delayed Broadcast)
67	5	"Mission: Incredible"	Janus	Simon Hynd	Jonny Kurman	21 January 2013
68	6	"The Hive"	The Crime Minister	Adrian McDowall	Jonny Kurzman	28 January 2013
69	7	"Old School"	Jemima Thursday	Adrian McDowall	Chris Lindsay (story); David Hancock (editing); Simon Allen (rewrites)	4 February 2013
70	8	"The Germinator"	Bobby Bleach and The Crime Minister	Simon Hynd	Nathan Cockerill	11 February 2013
71	9	"The Dark Wizard"	The Dark Wizard (A.K.A. William Todd Williams)	Richard Senior	Jonny Kurzman	18 February 2013
72	10	"One Flew Over the Budgie's Cage"	Dr Retentive and The Crime Minister	Richard Senior	Malcolm McGonigle	4 March 2013
73	11	"Prison Break"	Arme Gonnerson	Richard Senior	Ben Ward	11 March 2013
74	12	"Inheritance"	Kloe (B:9:2:K:L:O:E:7)	Adrian McDowall	Ben Ward	18 March 2013
75	13	"The Final Endgame"	Dr Steinberg, The Crime Minister and The Mastermind	Adrian McDowall	Ben Ward; Ben Ward & Nathan Cockerill (story)	25 March 2013

=== Series 7 (2014) ===
No. overall	No. in series	Title	Villains	Directed by	Written by	Original release date
76	1	"The Mayze"	Dr Linus Currie, The Crime Minister and The Mastermind	Richard Senior	Ben Ward; Ben Ward & Nathan Cockerill (story)	13 January 2014
77	2	"Frankenstein"	Super-Soldier Frank	Richard Senior	Nathan Cockerill; Nathan Cockerill & Ben Ward (story)	20 January 2014
78	3	"The Man Who Drew Tomorrow"	The Crime Minister	Richard Senior	Jonny Kurzman	27 January 2014
79	4	"Revenge is Sweet"	President Carlotta	James Henry	Malcolm McGonigle	3 February 2014
80	5	"The Shadow Games"	Alexis von Hades and SKAPULA Assassins	James Henry	Ben Ward; Ben Ward & Nathan Cockerill (story)	10 February 2014
81	6	"The Beginning"	Dr Linus Currie, The Crime Minister (present) and Walter M Dainbridge (flashbacks)	James Henry	Nathan Cockerill; Nathan Cockerill & Ben Ward (story)	17 February 2014
82	7	"Return of the Dark Wizard"	The Dark Wizard	Adrian Mead	Jonny Kurzman	24 February 2014
83	8	"Free Runner"	Lloyd Lewis and Sergei Alexzandrov	Adrian Mead	Nathan Cockerill; Nathan Cockerill & Ben Ward (story)	3 March 2014
84	9	"The League of Mata Hari"	Stella Knight and The League of Mata Hari	Adrian Mead	Ben Ward; Ben Ward & Nathan Cockerill (story)	10 March 2014
85	10	"Sad Men"	Mr Scraper	Adrian Mead	Simon Allen	17 March 2014
86	11	"The Problem Probe"	Android Mandy Pluckey and The Crime Minister	Richard Senior	Simon Allen	24 March 2014
87	12	"We Need to Talk About KORTEX" (Part 1)	Hamish Campbell, The Crime Minister and The Mastermind	Richard Senior	Ben Ward; Ben Ward & Nathan Cockerill (story)	31 March 2014
Note: This episode was originally edited into a 55-minute special with "The Last Stand".
88	13	"The Last Stand" (Part 2)	Hamish Campbell, Mike Stern, The Crime Minister and The Mastermind	Richard Senior	Nathan Cockerill; Nathan Cockerill & Ben Ward (story)	31 March 2014
Note: This episode was originally edited into a 55-minute special with "We Need to Talk About KORTEX".
