= Rona Morison =

Scottish actress and narrator

- Born: Glasgow, Scotland
- Occupations: Actress and narrator
- Years active: 2012–present
- Known for: Our Ladies (2019) and Absentia (2020)

Rona Morison is a Scottish actress and narrator. Her credits include playing Chell in Our Ladies (2019), Thompson in Absentia (2020), Danni in The Control Room (2022), and Lady Macduff in Macbeth (2025).

== Early life ==
Morison was born and raised near to Glasgow in Scotland. Morison attended St Columba's School in Kilmacolm, then joined the Scottish Youth Theatre before being accepted into the Guildhall School of Music and Drama in London at the age of 17. She graduated from the Guildhall School of Music & Drama in 2011, after attending workshops with Charlotte Munkso at Prima del Teatro and with the Royal Shakespeare Company.

== Career ==
=== Film and television ===
In 2020, Morison appeared in a main role as Chell in the Michael Caton-Jones directed Our Ladies, the world premiere of which, was held at the 2019 BFI London Film Festival on 4 October. and was later screened at the 2020 Glasgow Film Festival.

In 2022, she starred as Danni in the Glasgow-based 3-part BBC drama thriller The Control Room, alongside Daniel Portman.

Morison has also been the narrator of series 6,7 and 8 of the BBC television series This Farming Life. In 2025, Morison starred as Lady Macduff in a cinematic version of the successful 2024 play production of Macbeth, which also starred David Tennant and Cush Jumbo.

=== Theatre ===
Morison's theatre career has included Scuttlers at the Royal Exchange Theatre, To Kill a Mockingbird at the Open Air Theatre in Regent's Park, Illusions at the Bush Theatre and The Second Mrs Tanqueray at Rose Theatre in Kingston. Morison played the lead role of 15-year-old Minnie in the 2017 in a play based on the Phoebe Gloeckner novel and Marielle Heller film The Diary of a Teenage Girl, at the Southwark Playhouse. Morison performed another lead role in the 2018 production of The Prime of Miss Jean Brodie at the Donmar Warehouse. Morison received a nomination at the 2018 Evening Standard Theatre Awards for the Emerging Talent Award for her performance as Sandy in The Prime of Miss Jean Brodie at the Donmar Warehouse in 2018.

In 2020, Morison has appeared in The Haystack at the Hampstead Theatre

In 2024, Morison starred as Lady Macduff in Donmar Warehouse production of Macbeth, which also starred David Tennant and Cush Jumbo.

=== Other work ===
From 2021 to Jan 2025, between roles, Morison doubled as an acting teacher at the Fontainebleau School of Acting in Fontainebleau just outside of Paris, France.

== Filmography ==
=== Film ===
Year	Title	Role
2012	City Slacker	Receptionist
2012	Love Bite	Fiona
2015	Sliding (Short Film)	Annie
2018	Ready Player One	Oology Expert
2018	Solo: A Star Wars Story	Spaceport mother
2019	Our Ladies	Chell
2021	It's Not Gonna Suck Itself (Short Film)	The Barmaid
2025	Macbeth (2025 film)	Lady Macduff

=== Television ===
Year	Title	Role	Notes
2017	Decline and Fall	Tia	1 episode - Pompilia de la Conradine
2020	Absentia	Thompson	6 episodes
2022	The Control Room	Danni	All 3 episodes
2016	This Farming Life	Narrator	2 series and currently airing series

== Awards and nominations ==
Year	Award	Category	Nominated work	Company/Theatre	Result	Ref.
2017	BroadwayWorld UK Awards	Best Actress in a new production of a play	The Diary of a Teenage Girl	Southwark Playhouse	Nominated	
2017	The Offies	Full Run Plays: Best Female Performance	The Diary of a Teenage Girl	Southwark Playhouse	Nominated	
2018	Evening Standard Theatre Awards	Emerging Talent Award	The Prime of Miss Jean Brodie	Donmar Warehouse	Nominated	
