= Diary of a Teenage Girl (disambiguation) =

Diary of a Teenage Girl is a series of Christian young adult novels by Melody Carlson.

It may also refer to:

- The Diary of a Teenage Girl: An Account in Words and Pictures, a 2002 graphic novel by Phoebe Gloeckner
  - The Diary of a Teenage Girl, a 2015 American comedy-drama film directed by Marielle Heller, based on the novel
  - The Diary of a Teenage Girl (play), a 2010 play directed by Sarah Cameron Sunde and Rachel Eckerling, based on the novel

== See also ==
- The Diary of a Young Girl, the diary of Anne Frank
