= The Diary of a Teenage Girl (play) =

Play by Marielle Heller

The Diary of a Teenage Girl is a play in one-act by Marielle Heller based on the novel of the same name by Phoebe Gloeckner. The play was first performed at the 3LD Art & Technology Center in New York City in 2010. It was produced by Aaron Louis in association with New Georges & The Essentials and starred writer Marielle Heller in the lead role of Minnie Goetze. The original production was directed by Sarah Cameron Sunde and Rachel Eckerling.

The play follows the coming-of-age story of 15 year-old Minnie Goetze living in San Francisco in 1976.

== Background ==
Marielle Heller adapted The Diary of a Teenage Girl: An Account in Words and Pictures after having read the book, which she found to be a jarring and life-changing experience. She immediately contacted the publisher for the rights. Initially dismissed and written off having never pursued the rights to anything, Heller wouldn't take no for an answer. She persisted for months, and finally got her pitch through to Gloeckner, who was impressed with her vision. With Gloeckner's blessing secure, Heller began to develop the adaptation, first with the mentorship of Berkeley Repertory Theatre's Artistic Director Tony Taccone, and then in collaboration with the directing team of Sarah Cameron Sunde and Rachel Eckerling.

== Premise ==
Expulsion, a drunken mother, drug abuse, and an affair with her mom's boyfriend: these are the elements that make up fifteen-year-old Minnie's life as she grows up in the chaos of the 70s. But Minnie is bright and self-reflective, and narrates her story in her diary with brutally honest words and drawings. This acclaimed adaptation of Phoebe Gloeckner's graphic novel sparkles with wit, curiosity, and optimism despite the loneliness and abuse that Minnie encounters. A poignant look into an ugly adolescence.

== List of Characters ==
Minnie Goetze, a 15-year-old aspiring artist.

Charlotte, Minnie's mother.

Monroe, Charlotte's boyfriend.

Pascal, Charlotte's ex-husband and Minnie's stepfather.

Kimmie, Minnie's best friend.

== Original Production (2010) ==
The original production ran at the 3LD Art & Technology Center from March 15 - May 1, 2010.

=== Reception ===
- "The great achievement of The Diary of a Teenage Girl, adapted from Phoebe Gloeckner's graphic novel, is to take the girl's point of view seriously. Neither sentimental nor judgmental, Diary presents Minnie Goetze as a smart, creative, passionate young woman, and the production's only agenda is to be true to her experience." - Backstage
- "The Diary of a Teenage Girl, the compelling 2002 novel in words and comics by Phoebe Gloeckner, stings with truth... Now 'Diary' -- an account of Minnie's largely unsupervised adolescence in the Bay Area, drifting through its druggy, erotic morass in the '70s and agonizing through a sexual entanglement with her mother's boyfriend -- has been reverently adapted by Marielle Heller... In streamlining the story, Ms. Heller centers on the toxic bond between Minnie and Monroe, and the production best succeeds as a lacerating indictment of predatory male self-indulgence..." - The New York Times
- "I think what may be controversial about this production is that it is not a morality tale and it is not a victim narrative. Minnie is almost always portrayed as having agency. She's not exploited by her 34 year old lover, she doesn't 'realize the errors of her ways' and magically reform into a good girl. What she does is survive." - Culturebot
- "The Diary of a Teenage Girl: The Play is riveting theater, and as skillful a comics adaptation as I've come across. If you're in New York and have any interest in...an unusual and innovative theatrical experience, or simply in a movingly no-bullshit exploration of the lives of young people and the older people who shape them, I'm almost willing to buy you the tickets myself." - Comic Book Resource

=== Cast ===
Minnie Marielle Heller

Charlotte Mariann Mayberry

Monroe Michael Laurence (Arthur Aulisi in extension)

Pascal Jon Krupp

Kimmie Nell Mooney

=== Creative team ===
Directors Sarah Cameron Sunde & Rachel Eckerling

Set Design Lauren Helpern

Lighting Design Laura Mroczkowski

Video Design Andrew Bauer

Sound Design Marcelo Añez

Costume Design Emily DeAngelis

Prop Design Lauren Asta

General Manager Lisa Dozier

Stage Manager Erin Koster

Fight Director Alexis Black

== London Production (2017) ==
The Diary of a Teenage Girl will have its European premiere at London's Southwark Playhouse in March 2017.

=== Creative Team ===
Director Alexander Parker

Director Amy Ewbank

Set and Costume Designer Andrew Riley

Lighting designer David Howe

Sound designer James Nicholson

Video designer Nina Dunn

Production Manager Ian Taylor for eStage Production

Co-producer Jack Maple

Co-producer David Wilder Productions

Co-producer Emily Lunnon Productions

== Film adaptation (2015) ==
Following the success of the original production, Phoebe Gloeckner gave the film rights to the book to Marielle Heller. Marielle Heller went on to write and direct The Diary of a Teenage Girl which became one of the most critically acclaimed movies of 2015. The film starred Bel Powley as Minnie, Alexander Skarsgard as Monroe and Kristen Wiig as Charlotte.

== See also ==
- Phoebe Gloeckner's website
- 3LD website
- Southwark Playhouse website
- The Diary of a Teenage Girl at IMDb
