= Hayley Squires =

English actress and playwright

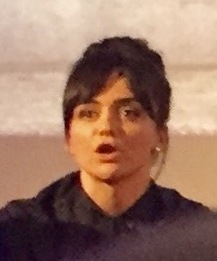
- Born: 16 April 1988 (age 38); Forest Hill, London, England
- Education: Rose Bruford College
- Occupations: Actress and playwright
- Years active: 2012–present

Hayley Squires (born 16 April 1988) is an English actress and playwright. She is the recipient of a number of accolades, including an International Emmy Award and nominations for a British Academy Film Award, a British Academy Television Award and a Laurence Olivier Award.

Squires made her feature film debut in Blood Cells (2014) and gained prominence through her role in the Ken Loach film I, Daniel Blake (2016), for which she won a British Independent Film Award and received a British Academy Film Award nomination. Her films since include In the Earth (2021) and Hoard (2023).

For her performance in the Channel 4 drama Adult Material (2020), Squires won an International Emmy Award and was nominated for a British Academy Television Award. On television, she also starred in the BBC series Collateral (2018) and The Night Manager (2026), the Apple TV series The Essex Serpent (2022), and the Netflix series Legends (2026).

Squires is also known for her theatre work, earning a Laurence Olivier Award nomination for her performance in the West End production of All My Sons (2025).

== Early life and education ==
Hayley Squires was born 16 April 1988 in Forest Hill, South London, and grew up with her mother, father, and older brother. Her mother was a cook at her school and her father managed a video shop. The family moved to Kent when she was 14.

She trained at Rose Bruford College in Sidcup and graduated in 2010 with BA (Hons) Acting, alongside best friend and fellow actor David Carlyle.

== Career ==
Squires' first play, Vera Vera Vera (2012), was produced by the Royal Court Theatre in London.

== Acting credits ==
=== Film ===
Year	Title	Role	Note	Ref.
2014	Blood Cells	Hayley		
2015	A Royal Night Out	Debbie		
2015	Polar Bear	Lea	Short film	
2016	I, Daniel Blake	Katie		
2016	Away	Kaz		
2018	Happy New Year, Colin Burstead	Gini Burstead		
2018	In Fabric	Babs		
2021	In the Earth	Olivia Wendle		
2021	The Electrical Life of Louis Wain	Marie Wain		
2021	True Things	Alison		
2023	Beau Is Afraid	Penelope		
2023	Hoard	Cynthia		
2023	No Way Home	Mum		
2024	Blitz	Tilda		

=== Television ===
Year	Title	Role	Notes	Ref.
2012	Call the Midwife	Maureen Warren	Episode #1.1	
2013	Complicit	Joan	Television film	
2013	Southcliffe	Louise Cooper	3 episodes	
2016	Murder	Bryony Phelps	Episode: "The Lost Weekend"	
2017	The Last Leg	Herself – Guest appearance	Episode No. 12 of Series 10	
2017	Philip K. Dick's Electric Dreams	Waitress	Episode: "The Commuter"	
2017	The Miniaturist	Cornelia	3 episodes	
2018	Collateral	Laurie Stone	3 episodes	
2020	Adult Material	Jolene Dollar	4 episodes	
2022	The Essex Serpent	Martha	6 episodes	
2022	Maryland	Mary	Television film	
2023	Great Expectations	Sara	5 episodes	
2024	Inside No. 9	Devonshire	Episode: "The Curse of the Ninth"	
2026	The Night Manager	Sally Price-Jones	Series 2	
2026	Legends	Kate	Season 1	
2027	Shy & Lola†	Shy	Lead role	

=== Theatre ===
Year	Title	Role	Notes	Ref.
2015	As Good a Time as Any	Amy	The Print Room	
2017	The Pitchfork Disney	Haley Stray	Shoreditch Town Hall, Directed by Jamie Lloyd	
2017	Cat on a Hot Tin Roof	Mae	Apollo Theatre, Directed by Benedict Andrews	
2018	The Lover and The Collection	Sarah/Stella	Harold Pinter Theatre, Directed by Jamie Lloyd	
2025	All My Sons	Ann Deever	Wyndham's Theatre, Directed by Ivo van Hove	

== Accolades ==
Award	Year	Category	Performance	Result
British Independent Film Awards	2016	Best Actress	I, Daniel Blake	Nominated
British Independent Film Awards	2016	Most Promising Newcomer	I, Daniel Blake	Won
British Academy Film Awards	2017	Best Actress in a Supporting Role	I, Daniel Blake	Nominated
Denver Film Festival	2016	Special Jury Prize: Best Actress	I, Daniel Blake	Won
Empire Film Awards	2017	Best Female Newcomer	I, Daniel Blake	Nominated
Evening Standard British Film Awards	2016	Best Supporting Actress.	I, Daniel Blake	Won
London Film Critics' Circle	2017	British/Irish Actress of the Year	I, Daniel Blake	Nominated
National Film Awards	2017	Best Breakthrough Performance	I, Daniel Blake	Nominated
British Academy Television Awards	2021	Best Actress	Adult Material	Nominated
49th International Emmy Awards	2021	Best Actress	Adult Material	Won
Laurence Olivier Awards	2026	Best Actress in a Supporting Role	All My Sons	Nominated
