= Our Ladies =

- Theatrical release poster
- Directed by: Michael Caton-Jones
- Written by: Alan Sharp; Michael Caton-Jones
- Based on: The Sopranos by Alan Warner
- Produced by: Jennifer Armitage; Michael Caton-Jones; Brian Coffey; Victoria Dabbs; Diego Suarez Chialvo; Laura Viederman
- Starring: Tallulah Greive; Abigail Lawrie; Rona Morison; Sally Messham; Marli Siu; Eve Austin
- Cinematography: Denis Crossan
- Edited by: Istvan Kiraly; Tomi Szabo
- Music by: Roddy Hart; Tommy Reilly
- Production companies: Sigma Films; Four Point Play Pictures; Sony Pictures International Productions
- Distributed by: Sony Pictures Releasing
- Release dates: 4 October 2019 (BFI); 27 August 2021 (United Kingdom)
- Running time: 105 minutes
- Country: United Kingdom
- Language: English
- Box office: $533,232

Our Ladies is a 2019 Scottish coming-of-age comedy-drama film produced and directed by Michael Caton-Jones, who co-wrote the screenplay with Alan Sharp, based on Alan Warner's 1998 novel The Sopranos. The film stars Tallulah Greive, Abigail Lawrie, Rona Morison, Sally Messham, Marli Siu, and Eve Austin.

Our Ladies premiered at the 2019 BFI London Film Festival. Its original theatrical release date of 6 March 2020 was delayed multiple times due to the COVID-19 pandemic, before finally being released in the United Kingdom on 27 August 2021.

== Plot ==
In 1996, five best friends attend a strict Catholic school for girls in the Scottish Highlands town of Fort William. They get the opportunity to go to Edinburgh for a choir competition, but they are more interested in drinking, partying and hooking up than winning the competition. The group includes Orla, who is in recovery from leukemia and has an attitude of living life to the fullest; Finnoula, a brainy girl who is desperate to experience life beyond her small town; Chell, a wild child struggling with the loss of her father; Manda, a sharp-tongued, witty girl; and Kylah, a musical protégé with a rebellious spirit.

== Cast ==
- Tallulah Greive as Orla
- Abigail Lawrie as Finnoula
- Rona Morison as Chell
- Sally Messham as Manda
- Marli Siu as Kylah
- Eve Austin as Kay
- Kate Dickie as Sister Condron
- Chris Fulton as Danny
- Jack Greenlees as Bobby
- Stuart Martin as Terry Mooney
- Myra McFanyen as Elsie
- Bethany Tennick as Bridget
- Martin Quinn as Stephen
- Ross Anderson as Slab
- David Hasselhoff as himself

== Production ==
=== Development ===
Michael Caton-Jones optioned Alan Warner's novel The Sopranos in 1998. It was announced in 2018 that production on a film adaptation had begun. Caton-Jones directed the film and wrote the screenplay with Alan Sharp. The film was produced by Sigma Films, Sony Pictures International Productions, and Four Point Play Pictures in association with Screen Scotland. Warner himself and Jennifer Armitage of Creative Scotland executive produced and Caton-Jones produced alongside Laura Viederman of Four Point Play and Brian Coffey of Sigma. Luke Scrase oversaw the film for SPIP.

=== Filming ===
Principal photography took place on location in Fort William and Edinburgh. Some scenes were also filmed in Glasgow.

== Release ==
The world premiere of Our Ladies was held at the 2019 BFI London Film Festival on 4 October. It was also shown at the 2020 Glasgow Film Festival on 28 February. A trailer was released in January 2020. The film was initially set for theatrical release in the UK on 6 March 2020, which was then delayed to 24 April and subsequently 11 September due to the COVID-19 pandemic, before being shelved indefinitely. It was released at select AMC Theatres in the United States on 18 June 2021, and in cinemas in the UK on 27 August.

== Reception ==
The film received critical acclaim. On review aggregator website Rotten Tomatoes, it has an approval rating of 93% based on 29 reviews with an average rating of 7/10. The consensus states: "Despite its outdated ideas about teen sexuality, Our Ladies presents a well-acted and affectingly nuanced portrait of female friendship."

Amal Abdi of the Evening Standard wrote, "One of the best features of Our Ladies is the distastefulness of its characters. This posse of unruly young women are brash, bullies and often magnificently cruel. Yet it is precisely these reasons that make the film more radical than offensive. By playing into the stereotypes, Our Ladies rejects the established portrayals which turn ordinary school girls into bad asses or inexplicable geniuses in the name of a 'strong female character.'" Abdi commented further, "Our Ladies has its flaws. The tone is uneven, it is overly eager and there are points when it is unrealistic to the point of absurdity. Nevertheless, it deserves to be seen. It speaks to the thinly veiled misogyny that has long governed the treatment of young women."

Sophie Butcher of The Film Magazine said, "there’s a raucous energy and seemingly specifically Scottish nostalgia evident in Our Ladies that really set it apart", and concluded "Our Ladies is a wildly entertaining riot of a movie."
