= Nightsleeper =

British television series

- Promotional image
- Genre: Crime thriller
- Created by: Nick Leather
- Written by: Laura Grace; Nick Leather
- Directed by: John Hayes; Jamie Magnus Stone
- Starring: Alexandra Roach; Joe Cole; Remy Beasley; Katie Leung; Leah MacRae; Ruth Madeley; Pamela Nomvete; Sharon Rooney; Micah Balfour; Alex Ferns; Sharon Small; James Cosmo; David Threlfall; Jonjo O'Neill
- Country of origin: United Kingdom
- Original language: English
- No. of series: 1
- No. of episodes: 6

Production
- Executive producers: Kate Harewood; Gaynor Holmes; Nick Leather; Noemi Spanis; Jamie Magnus Stone
- Producer: Jonathan Curling
- Cinematography: Arthur Mulhern
- Production company: Euston Films

Original release
- Network: BBC One
- Release: 15 September 2024 – present

Nightsleeper is a British crime thriller television series created and written by Nick Leather for BBC One. It stars Joe Cole and Alexandra Roach and is produced by Euston Films. The series premiered on 15 September 2024. In June 2026, the show was renewed for a second series.

== Synopsis ==
A real time drama, the series is set on the fictional Heart of Britain sleeper train travelling to London from Glasgow. Two people who have not met before must work together to try to save the lives of the passengers.

== Cast and characters ==
=== Passengers & Train Crew ===
- Joe Cole as Joseph Roag (Joe), a former Metropolitan Police Detective Inspector on the run after being accused of theft
- Ruth Madeley as Chrissy Doolan, a disabled human rights solicitor
- James Cosmo as Fraser Warren, an elderly retired train driver for Heart of Britain and Sophie's father-in-law
- Katie Leung as Rachel Li, a lifestyle trends reporter
- Sharon Small as Liz Draycott MP, the Secretary of State for Transport
- Alex Ferns as Arran Moy, a belligerent accountant in first class
- Daniel Cahill as Danny Geoghan, an oil rig worker with a satellite phone
- Leah MacRae as Sophie Warren, Fraser's daughter-in-law
- Scott Reid as Billy McCloud, one of the train customer service crew
- Sharon Rooney as Yasmin Brown, one of the train customer service crew
- Adam Mitchell as Max "Mouse" Ellis, a young boy who befriends Joe
- Lois Chimimba as Erin Connolly, a hotel worker and student

=== British Government ===
- Alexandra Roach as Abigail 'Abby' Aysgarth, the acting Technical Director of the National Cyber Security Centre (NCSC)
- David Threlfall as Paul 'Pev' Peveril, former Technical Director of the NCSC fired for whistleblowing
- Pamela Nomvete as Nicola Miller, the Director of GCHQ
- Gabriel Howell as Tobi McKnight, a computer whizz at the NCSC.
- Parth Thakerar as Saj Sidhu, a technical expert at the NCSC
- Jasmine Naziha Jones as Zed Hylton, a technical expert at the NCSC
- Jonjo O'Neill as Mark Hudson (Hud), a senior Security Service field officer
- Micah Balfour as Leon Parhill, a technical expert at the NCSC

=== Other ===
- Gavin Mitchell as Andy Maver.
- Remy Beasley as Meg Hooton, Abby's friend

== Episodes ==
=== Series 1 (2024) ===
No.	Title	Directed by	Written by	Original release date	U.K. viewers (millions)
1	"Episode 1"	Jamie Magnus Stone	Nick Leather	15 September 2024	5.88
A policeman Joseph (Joe) is travelling by a night train from Glasgow to London. He noticed that someone tried to take over control of the train. He calls Abby, the deputy of cybernetics safety but the whole British rail transport system is under attack.
2	"Episode 2"	Jamie Magnus Stone	Nick Leather	16 September 2024	4.66
When the cyber attack on the rail network prevents Abby from seeing the obstacles in the sleeper's path, she realises that she's in race against time to avert disaster; with the so-called Driver being one step ahead, she must think fast.
3	"Episode 3"	Jamie Magnus Stone	Nick Leather	22 September 2024	5.21
Realising that someone on board may be working with the hackers, Joe turns his attention to his fellow passengers, while Abby stuns her colleagues by taking the train off the mainline.
4	"Episode 4"	John Hayes	Laura Grace	23 September 2024	4.84
While Hud's shocking attempt to stop the train his way threatens to end in disaster, Abby is stunned to discover that Joe may be in even more danger than any of them realised.
5	"Episode 5"	John Hayes	Laura Grace	29 September 2024	5.32
As Hud and Miller interrogate Abby, Joe tries to deal with the fallout to the shock shooting whilst deciding whether or not to put his faith in Saj or the other passengers.
6	"Episode 6"	John Hayes	Nick Leather	30 September 2024	5.30
Abby is convinced that she knows how to stop the remaining carriages; however, with Joe out of contact and time running out, it might be too late for those hurtling towards the end of the line.

== Production ==
It was revealed in December 2022 that the BBC had commissioned the series written by Nick Leather who is also executive producer alongside Gaynor Holmes for Euston Films. Executive producers also include Kate Harewood and Neomi Spanos. Jonathan Curling is producing. The series is directed by Jamie Magnus Stone and John Hayes.

On 19 June 2026, the BBC renewed the show for a second series, with Element Pictures as a producing studio.

=== Casting ===
In April 2023 it was revealed that Joe Cole and Alexandra Roach would lead the cast. That same month other cast members were revealed including David Threlfall, Ruth Madeley, Alex Ferns, Sharon Small, James Cosmo, Lois Chimimba, Gabriel Howell, Katie Leung, Leah MacRae, Adam Mitchell, Sharon Rooney, Pamela Nomvete, Scott Reid, Daniel Cahill, and Parth Thakerar.

In September 2026, the cast for the second series was revealed, with Colin Morgan, Madeleine Mantock and Christian Cooke being the lead cast. Other cast members have also been revealed including Alexander Arnold, Lydia Page, Christine Bottomley, Julie Dray, Pooky Quesnel, Jonathan Harden, Mickey Mason, Kevin Harvey, Cúán Hosty-Blaney, Eileen O’Higgins, Samuel Edward-Cook, Emily Flain, Tareq Al-Jeddal and Sam Hoare.

=== Filming ===
Filming took place in Glasgow in April 2023. The opening scene was filmed in Glasgow's Central Station. Filming was also done in and outside Victoria Station, London. The interior scenes of the National Cyber Security Centre were filmed at the City of Glasgow College's Riverside Campus. The interior train scenes were shot at Pioneer Studios, near Glasgow, featuring a full-scale train set built specifically for the production. To mimic the movement of the train, LED video walls were installed, creating a dynamic and realistic backdrop.

Filming for the second series has taken place in Belfast.

== Broadcast ==
The series premiered on BBC One on 15 September 2024 and had its BBC iPlayer streaming release on the same day.

== Reception ==
The Guardian's Lucy Mangan gave the "fantastically dreadful" series two stars out of five, saying that the plot became "increasingly ridiculous and even within the elastic definition we apply to these capers, absurd" and the dialogue "increasingly abysmal", and calling Joe Cole's performance "expressionless to the point of distraction".

Writing in The Daily Telegraph, Keith Watson gave the series three stars out of five, saying that "[f]or all its adrenalin-rush moments [...] the basic premise makes about as much sense as the rail ticket pricing system", that the cliffhanger moments were "the TV equivalent of rubber-necking: you know you should look away but you really can't", and that the series was best enjoyed by suspending disbelief. In Watson's estimation, Joe Cole "does a kind of low-rent Speed-era Keanu Reeves turn" but nevertheless made "a fine action hero", while the passengers aboard the hacked train were "little more than clichés with issues, their backstories inserted to fill in the bits between chases/near misses/staring at the rail-route map."

In Radio Times, David Craig gave the series two stars out of five, saying it was "laden with cliché in terms of dialogue and plot structure [...] taking several staples out of the bland conspiracy thriller playbook" and "compromised by the sheer volume of jokes, which go beyond comic relief to almost rendering this show an outright comedy-drama." Craig devoted several paragraphs of his review to criticising what he saw as the use of the passengers to "shoe-horn" a social unity narrative "in a clunky, cringe-inducing manner". Craig would finish his review by saying the series felt "like a show that couldn't decide what it wanted to be", with "shades of a self-aware train-set action-comedy, dashes of a nervy cyber thriller, and attempts at hard-hitting social commentary on political polarisation and marginalisation. Blended together, it makes a strange concoction".

Reviewing the series for the Herald, Alison Rowat gave the series two stars out of five, saying that it was "six hours of bum-numbing nonsense that makes the Father Ted remake of Speed [...] look like The Taking of Pelham One Two Three" and "[e]very now and then a too silly by-half twist comes along, or a slab of terrible dialogue, and the action screeches to a halt."

Writing in The Times, Carol Midgley gave the series three stars out of five but found it "very schlocky" and said that "[t]he implausibilities started from the opening frame."

In a more positive review, Gerard Gilbert of the i gave the series four stars out of five (albeit appearing to have reviewed the first episode only), calling it "a high-speed blast from start to finish" and saying that the train-borne setting was original and "fruitfully explored" and that the action onscreen "moved at a suitably unrelenting pace but was laced with dry humour."

Digital Spy's Janet Leigh, whilst not carrying out a proper review as such, said that the plot twist in the final episode was representative of the series' issues with plot twists as a whole, "each one losing more and more intrigue as the story progressed. The show overplayed the whodunnit aspect so much that [...] the identity of the real culprit landed without excitement." Likewise, the impending train crash was deprived of narrative weight due to the "many, MANY hair-raising moments that came before" and due to it being "extremely obvious" that the characters were not "about to meet their end in grisly fashion." Leigh concluded that the series "did manage to maintain a sense of urgency and pace in spite of the flaws but perhaps was a little too eager to prove itself as a gripping mystery thriller."
