= Chris Fulton =

Scottish actor (born 1988)

- Born: 27 November 1988 (age 37)
- Education: Royal Conservatoire of Scotland
- Years active: 2015–present

Christopher D. Fulton (born 27 November 1988) is a Scottish actor.

== Early life ==
Fulton grew up in Castle Douglas in Dumfries and Galloway. His parents David and Pauline run the King's Arms Hotel. Fulton trained at the Royal Conservatoire of Scotland in Glasgow, graduating in 2012 with a Bachelor of Arts in Acting.

== Career ==
Fulton began his career with roles as Ferg in the 2015 adaptation of Stonemouth and Jay in the 2016 miniseries One of Us, both on BBC One. He then played banker Charlie Lamont-Smith, Phoebe's (Ella-Rae Smith) love interest, in the first series of the 2017 BBC Three thriller Clique. The following year, Fulton made his feature film debut as Euan Bruce in the Netflix medieval epic Outlaw King, starring Chris Pine as Robert the Bruce. He had his second film role as Danny in the 2019 comedy-drama Our Ladies.

In 2020, Fulton began playing Sir Philip Crane in the Netflix period drama Bridgerton, an adaptation of the Regency romance novels by Julia Quinn. The following year, Fulton appeared in the second season of the Netflix fantasy series The Witcher as the villain Rience. In August 2022, Fulton exited The Witcher ahead of its third season, and the role of Rience was taken over by Sam Woolf. Later in 2022, Fulton joined the cast of the Starz series Outlander for its seventh season as Rob Cameron, which aired in 2023. He also had a small role as Karl in the Sky series The Lazarus Project.

Fulton has an upcoming role in the romance film Falling Into Place opposite Aylin Tezel.

== Filmography ==
=== Film ===
Year	Title	Role	Notes
2016	Tamu	Jeffrey	Short film
2016	The Big Return of Ray Lamere	Bertie	Short film
2018	Outlaw King	Euan Bruce	
2019	Our Ladies	Danny	
2021	In It Together	Gabriel	Short Film
2023	Falling Into Place	Ian	Nominated for "Best Performance in a Debut Feature" alongside costar Aylin Tezel at the Raindance Film Festival

=== Television ===
Year	Title	Role	Notes
2015	Doctors	Chas Nuttall	Episode: "Idolatory"
2015	Stonemouth	Ferg	2-episode miniseries
2016	One of Us	Jay	Miniseries
2017	Clique	Charlie Lamont-Smith	6 episodes (series 1)
2017	Endeavour	Dr. Broderick Castle	Episode: "Game"
2019	Succession	Max	Episode: "Return"
2020–2022	Bridgerton	Sir Philip Crane	2 episodes
2021	The Witcher	Rience	4 episodes (season 2)
2022	The Lazarus Project	Karl	2 episodes (series 1)
2023–2026	Outlander	Rob Cameron	6 episodes (season 7) 1 episode uncredited (season 8)
2024	Last to Brake	Phil Read	Miniseries
2026	Silo	Mike Davidson	3 episodes (season 3)
