= Secrets and Words =

- Genre: Drama
- Starring: See below
- Country of origin: United Kingdom
- Original language: English
- No. of series: 1
- No. of episodes: 5

Production
- Production location: Liverpool
- Camera setup: Single-camera
- Running time: 44 mins
- Production company: LA Productions

Original release
- Network: BBC One
- Release: 26 March – 30 March 2012

Secrets and Words is a 2012 British drama television series shown on BBC One, produced by Jimmy McGovern's production company, LA Productions. Each episode is a story on the theme of adult literacy. BBC Skillswise collaborated with the series, providing adult learners with an activity to participate with following each episode.

== Production ==
The National Institute of Adult Continuing Education (NIACE) were involved in developing the series, highlighting challenges facing British who had literacy issues. It was filmed in Liverpool.

== Episodes ==
No.	Title	Directed by	Written by	Original release date
1	"Love Letters"	Ian Barber	Nick Leather	26 March 2012
JJ Roscoe (Tony Maudsley) is a painter and decorator who cannot read. He finds a series of letters addressed to his wife Lisa (Susan Cookson). He assumes they are from his workmate Anthony (Neil Bell). He asks his daughter Abby's (Sophie Coward) teacher Fiona Taylor (Julie Graham) to read them to him. Instead she teaches him to read and he discovers the truth about the content of the letters and who they are from.
2	"Help Me if You Can"	Gary Williams	Jaden Clark	27 March 2012
Single mother-of-three Valerie King (Christine Bottomley) starts a job as a dispenser at a pharmacy, working for pharmacist Ray Collins (Phil Davis). He has a drink problem and is struggling to cope after the death of his wife a year ago, who did the job that Valerie now does. When customer Billy Cooper becomes seriously ill, Valerie and Ray think they gave the wrong medication to Billy. Ray is unaware that Valerie is semi-literate; Ray was too drunk at the time he signed the prescription to remember if Billy was given the correct medication.
3	"A Study in Time"	Pauline Harris	Esther Wilson	27 March 2012
Manual worker Sam (Anthony Welsh), despite having no formal qualifications, successfully gets a job as a teacher through his persuasive interview but, whilst celebrating, falls down and bangs his head. After waking in hospital he finds he has lost the power of literacy. Determined no one should know about his literacy problem, Sam becomes impossible to live with and snaps at his young nephew Adam (Ki'Juan Whitton) when he unintentionally discovers Sam's problem. Anxious to get the job, Sam eventually gets girlfriend Naomi (Sarah Smart) to help him begin to learn to read again. Paranoid that people will find out his secret he lashes out, causing Naomi to leave him. However, after a family dinner he realises his priorities and reconciles with Naomi, putting the job on hold.
4	"The Crossing"	Reece Dinsdale	Arthur Ellison	29 March 2012
To Kathleen (Susie Blake), looking after an invalid mother for most of her life, her one link with the outside world is as a school crossing lady. She is friendly with pupil Megan (Ramona Marquez) and her divorcee father Jimmy (Lee Boardman) and when Megan and Jimmy are asked to do a reading for the school's Christmas play Megan, knowing her father is busy, asks Kathleen to join her instead. But Kathleen is illiterate, having given her life over to caring, and eventually must tell Megan, who feels betrayed. However, there is reconciliation when Kathleen encourages Jimmy to let Megan contact her mother and the little girl teaches Kathleen computer literacy to communicate with her sister in Canada.
5	"Mightier Than the Sword"	Julia Ford	Lyn Papadopoulos	30 March 2012
Jackie (Kaye Wragg) and John Jones (Derek Riddell) are a married couple. She is unable to read and is submissive to him. When she learns to read, she discovers from credit card statements that he is having an affair with one of his employees, Stacey (Robyn Addison).
