= Nick Leather =

British playwright and screenwriter

- Born: Lancashire, England
- Occupations: Playwright, screenwriter
- Known for: The Control Room; Rocket's Island; Hollyoaks; Nightsleeper

Nick Leather is a British playwright and screenwriter.

He is known as the creator of the drama series The Control Room and crime thriller Nightsleeper for BBC One, as well as the CBBC children's series Rocket's Island.

== Early life ==
Leather grew up in Newton-le-Willows. He worked for a time at local newspaper The Newton Guardian, the experience inspiring him to write.

== Career ==
Leather began in theatre, with his first play All The Ordinary Angels produced by Manchester's Royal Exchange Theatre, and later winning the Pearson Award for Best New Play. He would become the Royal Exchange's Playwright-in-Residence.

He subsequently moved into radio and then television, writing for series, including Justice, Secrets and Words and Jimmy McGovern's Moving On, as well as multiple episode of Hollyoaks. In 2012, he won the Writers' Guild of Great Britain award for Best Episode of a Continuing Drama for his work on Hollyoaks.

In 2012, he created the children's series Rocket's Island, about a family taking care of foster children at their island farm. It was nominated for a BAFTA children's award in the drama category in 2016 but lost out to the winner Refugee. Leather would alternate between adult and children's drama, writing for McGovern's Broken, and the Apple TV+ thriller Suspicion, as well as The Dumping Ground and The Worst Witch.

In 2018, he wrote the television film Mother's Day, based on an infamous IRA bombing attack in Warrington, close to where Leather had grown up and of which he had memories.

In 2021, the BBC commissioned The Control Room, a three-part thriller about an Emergency call handler, which would air on BBC One in 2022. Leather was inspired to write the series by a real-life health-scare involving his daughter.

It was announced on 8 December 2022 that Leather was writing a six-part thriller for BBC One, Nightsleeper.
