= The Control Room =

British thriller television series

- Genre: Thriller
- Created by: Nick Leather
- Directed by: Amy Neil
- Starring: Iain De Caestecker; Joanna Vanderham; Sharon Rooney; Stuart Bowman
- Music by: Carly Paradis
- Country of origin: United Kingdom
- Original language: English
- No. of series: 1
- No. of episodes: 3

Production
- Executive producers: Gaynor Holmes; Elaine Cameron
- Producer: Eric Coulter
- Cinematography: James Aspinall
- Editor: David Arthur
- Production company: Hartswood Films

Original release
- Network: BBC One
- Release: 17 July – 19 July 2022

The Control Room is a 2022 British thriller television series created by Nick Leather and produced by Hartswood Films. It stars Iain De Caestecker and Joanna Vanderham. The three-part series was broadcast on BBC One over consecutive nights from 17 to 19 July 2022, and was simultaneously available on BBC iPlayer.

== Cast and characters ==
- Iain De Caestecker as Gabe Maver, a reserved member of the control room, who is thrown back into his painful past upon receiving a call from someone from his childhood.
  - Harvey Calderwood as a young Gabe
- Joanna Vanderham as Sam Tolmie, a former childhood friend of Gabe's; they became close to each other with the absence of their mothers from their lives as kids, and as an adult ropes Gabe into covering up a crime.
  - Farrah Thomas as a young Sam
- Taj Atwal as Leigh, the duty manager of the control room, who is in a secret relationship with Gabe and becomes growingly frustrated at his behaviour.
- Daniel Portman as Anthony, the outgoing control room supervisor, who blackmails Gabe into criminal activity on his behalf.
- Sharon Rooney as DI Anna Breck, the lead detective on the case investigating the call to the control room, who grows suspicious of Gabe's actions.
- Stuart Bowman as Ian Maver, Gabe's father; the two have been estranged for some time, their relationship fraught since the death of the family matriarch when Gabe was a child.
- Rona Morison as Danni, working at the control room and, surreptitiously, under Anthony's thumb.
- Daniel Cahill as Robbo, a former childhood bully/friend of Gabe and Sam's, who blames Gabe for causing the fire at the Christmas tree farm that killed his father.
- Jatinder Singh Randhawa as Tah, a housemate of Gabe's engaged in criminal activity of his own.
- Taqi Nazeer as Jat, a jovial member of the control room.
- Garry Sweeney as Sean, the head of the criminal enterprise Anthony has become embroiled into and threatens his, Sam and Gabe's lives.
- Conor McLeod as Ross, another, junior, member of the control room.
- Simone Medonos as Gabe’s mum.

== Development and production ==
Leather was inspired to write the series by a real-life health-scare that happened with his daughter. He explained, "So when I then sat down and was trying to think of the story, when everything's okay, I just thought back to that and how, just for a few minutes, you don't know if things are going to be alright and you're so desperate," and in those "desperate few minutes, I realised sort of how profoundly the person on the other end of the line can help you and affect you. Their manner is so important", and "[i]t's such an intense relationship, such an intense conversation with [the emergency call handler], who you’ve never spoken to before, and you’re never gonna speak to again. You don't know what they look like, they don't know what you look like, yet despite that anonymity you are so dependent on them and you're reaching out to them. And the person on the other end of the phone line is a bit of an everyday hero. So based on that experience, I thought 'God, I wonder if there's something in that as a starting point?'", pondering "what if an emergency call room handler was pulled into the emergency? What if, in that professional situation, suddenly it was a personal situation?". He said "the next time I sat down and tried to come up with a story, I wrote two things at the top; one was call room handler and caller. I then put a circle around it and tried to think of the way the relationship between those two people would be and a scene that involved them both."

Leather disclosed that he had De Caestecker in mind as playing the character of Gabe as early as the writing of the series. De Caestecker spoke of having "felt a degree of responsibility when it came to portraying the career [of a call handler] accurately on screen", commenting that he experienced what it was like in a live control room, and that "they do such an amazing job [and] potentially don't get the credit they deserve", meaning it "was one thing we were very conscious of, just making sure we did that respectfully".

Filming took place during September and October 2021, in southern areas of Glasgow and the city centre, as well as at the Kelvingrove Art Gallery and Museum.

== Episodes ==
No.	Title	Directed by	Written by	Original release date	UK viewers (millions)
1	"Episode 1"	Amy Neil	Nick Leather	17 July 2022	5.38 (7-day); 6.6 (28-day)
On shift at a Glasgow ambulance control room, Gabe receives a call from a woman who has murdered someone - who reveals she knows him, using a childhood nickname. While pretending he doesn't know who the woman was to police and colleagues, he returns to places critical to his upbringing in the hopes of finding her, finding a frosty reception from his dad and former friends when he reveals who he's searching for. Giving coded instructions the next time she calls, she - Samantha Tolmie, local pariah - and Gabe are reunited, and following a promise made when they last were together, conjures up a plan to have Sam escape the repercussions of her actions that spirals out of control.
2	"Episode 2"	Amy Neil	Nick Leather	18 July 2022 (Note: Episodes 2 and 3 were made available on BBC iPlayer as a boxset on 17 July 2022, before their linear airdate.)	3.52 (7-day); 4.2 (28-day)
Anthony blackmails Gabe over his discovery of his links to Sam, the mystery caller, and ropes him into a scheme involving delivering a mysterious parcel and accepting payment for it on his behalf - in return for keeping silent. After previously managing to elude police and take the van Sam claims contains the body of her partner, his attempts to hide it further go awry when he discovers it missing, and on the journey to retrieve it reignites old passion and anger from those closest to him.
3	"Episode 3"	Amy Neil	Nick Leather	19 July 2022	3.22 (7-day); 4.0 (28-day)
Gabe manages to retrieve the van from the police pound, but before he and Sam can escape with it, is called to the control room by boss Leigh, where Gabe is informed Sam's claims are not what they seem. As he discovers how much Sam has kept from him, he questions his personal and work relationships, and in the process starts to piece together the events leading up to his ordeal - in the not-so-distant past and his traumatic childhood - placing his and Sam's lives at risk as their involvement in Anthony's criminal enterprise, and the truth behind the brutal end of their childhood friendship, catches up with all of them.

== Reception ==
The series has received mixed reviews, with specific praise given to the acting but critique over the use of flashbacks, as a stylistic device.

Emily Watkins of i only reviewed the first episode, yet said it "put hardly a foot wrong", that "[p]erformances from both De Caestecker and Vanderham were exquisite", and "[w]ith its fresh-feeling premise, fleshed out characters, and just enough twists to deliver escapism without compromising believability, [it] has all the ingredients to emerge as one of the year’s standout dramas", giving it four stars. Lucy Mangan of The Guardian awarded the same, praising the cast and setup, calling it "a thriller that takes a tremendous, hooky premise, then builds around it with loving detail", and that the "convolutions of the ... narrative seem to arise organically and never strain your credulity." James Hibbs from the Radio Times also awarded it four stars, praising the cast - De Caestecker in particular - as well as "the visuals", all of which "makes its [sic] an atmospheric and compelling watch, with any other qualms tempered by its sheer entertainment value", yet noted "the show's delight at concealing its multiple twists and turns [is] a tactic which works wonders at the start of the series but occasionally reaches the point of frustration midway through", exacerbated by "hefty dose of childhood flashbacks, a narrative device which always needs to serve a purpose, yet here largely chooses atmosphere over illumination, repeatedly slowing down the otherwise propulsive action".

Anita Singh of The Telegraph, in her two-star review, picked up the same point, saying the show "slumps under the weight of countless woozy flashbacks", and that De Caestecker's "impressive central performance" is "the only mark in its favour". Dan Einav's two-star review in the Financial Times remarked that the "trauma-filled flashbacks [were] stand[ing] in for careful character development", while deeming the show "sadly prosaic", "dry and uninspired", with the "scripting ... overwrought and the plot contrived". Sean O'Grady of The Independent called the flashbacks "annoyingly extensive, intrusive and confusing stylised" - "no better symbol of the creative impoverishment of television drama departments than this" - and that the show "is let down by too many" of them and "disjointed storytelling" that requires suspension of disbelief, somewhat "redeem[ed]" by "the performances of the leads" - especially Vanderham, her characterisation "disturbing but compelling" - in a three-star review.

Keith Watson, in Metro, awarded it three stars, commenting it was "a serviceable page-turner of a thriller, even if you feel you might have seen it all before", and that it "veers perilously close to out of control when it comes to plot twists and illogical choices from its characters", which "with so much plot to cram into every corner ... feel more like sketches than fully fledged entities." A further three-star review from Helen Hawkins of The Arts Desk praised the cast as "impeccable", but that "the noir setting often gets in their way", which Hawkins calls "inauthentic" alongside the "relentless melodramatic pitch of the plotting".

== International distribution ==
The Control Room has been distributed by All3Media International to various international markets. The show has a first-run window on BBC Studios, before later being broadcast on ABC Television in Australia. In China and Spain, the show has been acquired by streaming services Pumpkin Film and Filmin respectively. It airs in the Netherlands on NPO, and in Ireland on Virgin Media Television.

Dazzler Media obtained home entertainment rights in the UK and Ireland, with the series released on DVD on 31 December 2022.
