= Out There (film) =

Welsh comedy drama film

- Directed by: Simon Ryninks
- Screenplay by: Simon Ryninks
- Produced by: Katie Dolan; Tibo Travers
- Starring: Nerys Amber Stocks; Michael Sheen; Aneurin Barnard; Iwan Rheon; Tom Moya
- Production companies: Calculus Media; Gorilla TV; Sweetdoh Films; Bad Cat
- Release date: 14 August 2026 (Edinburgh)
- Running time: 80 minutes
- Country: United Kingdom
- Language: English

Out There is a 2026 British comedy drama science-fiction film written and directed by Simon Ryninks and starring Nerys Amber Stocks and Tom Moya with Michael Sheen, Aneurin Barnard, and Iwan Rheon.

The film premiered at the Edinburgh International Film Festival on 14 August 2026.

== Premise ==
A 16 year-old girl in a small seaside town in Wales in 1999 becomes convinced her father was abducted by aliens. Alongside her sceptical best friend she enlists a local UFO expert to solve the mystery.

== Cast ==
- Nerys Amber Stocks as Maz
- Tom Moya as Elis
- Michael Sheen as Shifty Gruff
- Aneurin Barnard as Bryn
- Alice Lowe as Seren
- Iwan Rheon as Lew
- Remy Beasley as Alwen
- Kimberley Nixon as Shelley
- Gwydion Rhys as Chris
- Daniel Whelan as Barry
- Rory Kelleher as Hari
- Vee Vimolal as Mai
- Lola Waters as Young Maz
- Rhys Parry Jones as Fisherman
- Matthew Aubrey as Lance Corporal Morgan
- Olivia Southgate as Cari
- Tesni Kujore

== Production ==
Out There is written and directed by Simon Ryninks in his feature length film debut. The film received support from the British Film Institute and Ffilm Cymru Wales, in association with Calculus Media and Gorilla TV. It is produced by Tibo Travers for Sweetdoh Films and Katie Dolan for Bad Cat. Ryninks said he had "always wanted to set a film on the Ceredigion coast” and had drawn inspiration for the project after learning about UFO sightings in west Wales in the 1970s, saying "I loved the idea that this quiet, unassuming place had this secret extraterrestrial history and suddenly a landscape that felt deeply personal also had this strange cosmic grandeur and an innate sense of people longing for the unknown".

The cast includes Nerys Amber Stocks as Maz with her best friend Little Elis portrayed by Tom Moya. Michael Sheen and Aneurin Barnard play local psychic Shifty Gruff and UFO-obsessed conspiracy theorist Bryn, respectively. The cast also includes Iwan Rheon and Alice Lowe, as well as Remy Beasley and Matthew Aubrey. The extended cast includes Olivia Southgate, Gwydion Rhys, Daniel Whelan, Rory Kelleher, Vee Vimolal, Lola Waters and Tesni Kujore.

Principal photography took place in Wales, with filming locations around Bridgend, Nelson and Porthcawl, and including Cardiff, Merthyr Mawr and Aberystwyth.

== Release ==
The film premiered at the 2026 Edinburgh International Film Festival on 14 August 2026.

== Reception ==
Film critic Peter Bradshaw from The Guardian described the film as "likable" and "entertaining", particularly highlighting Sheen's comic performance, and suggesting that "it could spin off nicely as a TV series." Ian Sandwell of Digital Spy gave Out There four out of five stars, noting that while it might be a bit gentle for some viewers' tastes, it balances sci-fi elements with genuine emotion and is "very Welsh". Allan Hunter, writing for Screen Daily, praised director Ryninks's nostalgic cinematography and noted that "among the many promising qualities that Ryninks reveals is his ability to work with actors, and the reliable cast is the jewel in the crown". Lily Hardman, writing for Far Out Magazine, called it "a sharp, breezy UFO yarn" and "a promising debut from a writer-director who clearly has a bright future ahead of him."
