= Remy Beasley =

Welsh actress

- Born: Remy Beasley; Chepstow, Wales
- Education: Royal Welsh College of Music & Drama
- Occupation: Actress

Remy Beasley is a Welsh actress best known for playing Beyoncé Evans in the Sky One TV comedy drama series Stella. She comes from Chepstow, where her mother Alison ran a pub.

== Filmography ==
=== Television ===
| Year | Title | Role | Notes |
|---|---|---|---|
| 2015–2017 | Stella | Beyonce Evans | |
| 2018 | The Salisbury Poisonings | Georgia | |
| 2018 | Sick of It | Maisie | |
| 2018 | Tourist Trap | Hari | |
| 2019 | Shakespeare & Hathaway: Private Investigators | Portia Montgomery | |
| 2023 | Still Up | Anna | |
| 2023 | Steeltown Murders | Young Christine Kappen | |
| 2024 | The Walk-In | Detective Constable Victoria Henderson | |
| 2024 | Nightsleeper | Meg Hooton | |
| 2025 | Death Valley | Rhiannon Hopkins | |
| 2025 | The Guest | Lowri Evans | BBC |

=== Film ===
| Year | Title | Role | Notes |
|---|---|---|---|
| 2026 | Out There | Alwen | |
