= Rocket's Island =

British TV programme (2012-2015)

- Genre: Fantasy; Adventure; Mystery
- Created by: Nick Leather
- Starring: Joe Gallucci; Helen Daniels; Jordan Benjamin; Keith Rice; Sydney Wade; Debra Stephenson; Anthony Flanagan; Natasha Joseph; Mark Jordon; Samuel Bottomley; Kit Connor; Lauren Press
- Opening theme: We Can Have It All (series 1)
- Ending theme: We Can Have It All (series 1; 2 episodes)
- Country of origin: United Kingdom
- Original language: English
- No. of series: 3
- No. of episodes: 29

Production
- Executive producers: Sue Nott; Rebecca Hodgson; Steve Christian; Tony Wood
- Producers: Tim Compton; Lucy Martin
- Running time: 30 minutes
- Production companies: Lime Pictures; All3Media

Original release
- Network: CBBC
- Release: 4 December 2012 – 7 December 2015

Rocket's Island is a British television series, created by Nick Leather about a family taking care of foster children. It stars Jordan Benjamin, Samuel Bottomley, Jack Hartley, Tom Coliandris, Helen Daniels and Joe Gallucci. It was produced by Lime Pictures and All3Media for CBBC.

It was nominated for a BAFTA children's award in the drama category in 2016, but lost out to the winner Refugee. Rocket's Island has never been released on DVD. The first series consisted of three episode, whilst series two and three consisted of thirteen episodes.

== Plot ==
Rocket's Island is about the Boulsworth family, who live at and run Knot Farm, who take care of a number of foster children who come and stay with them. Rocket and his friends have many adventures in their day-to-day lives with plenty of drama involved.

== Cast ==
=== Main ===
- Joe Gallucci as William "Rocket" Boulsworth
- Helen Daniels (Note: In series 1, she is credited as Helen Smith) as Alli Boulsworth
- Jordan Benjamin as Daniel "Dibber" Sparks
- Keith Rice as Casey (series 1)
- Sydney Wade as Lena/Jade Hollis (Note: Wade is not credited in the opening titles in series 2 episode 2, only in the end credits. She is returned to the opening for episode 3 onwards. She is absent and was not credited in episode 1.)
- Samuel Bottomley as Brandon Keleher (series 2–3) (Note: Bottomley is credited in the opening titles from S2Ep1 through S3Ep9, S3Ep9 he is not credited and does not appear.)
- Debra Stephenson (series 1)/Natasha Joseph (series 2–3) as Sarah Boulsworth
- Anthony Flanagan (series 1)/Mark Jordon (series 2–3) as Peter Boulsworth
- Kit Connor as Archie Beckles (main series 3; recurring series 2)
- Lauren Press as Izabella "Izzy Wizzy" Winston (series 3) (Note: Press is only credited in the opening in series 3 episodes 10–13; She was credited in end credits in episodes 7–9)

=== Recurring ===
- Tom Gilling as PC Gerry Beddoe
- William Hall as Jonathan Healey
- Tom Coliandris as Lucas Summer
- Leisa Gwenllian as Bethany Summer
- Isaac Rouse as Ben & Barney Bean
- Jack Hartley as Tyler McCray
- Gia Lodge-O'Meally as Madison Creetch
- Mark Frost as Elfyn Summers (series 3)
- Kéllé Bryan (series 1)/Suzette Llewellyn (series 2–3) as Wendy Sparks
- Ram John Holder as Grandad "The Oldest Man" Sparks
- Naoko Mori as Liz (series 1)

== Production ==
The series was filmed in North Wales, and in the Isle of Man.

== Episodes ==
Series	Episodes	Originally released	
Series	Episodes	First released	Last released
1	3	4 December 2012	6 December 2012
2	13	14 April 2014	7 July 2014
3	13	21 September 2015	7 December 2015

=== Series 1 (2012) ===
No. in series	Title	Directed by	Written by	Original release date	Viewers (millions)
1	"Episode 1"	Dirk Campbell	Nick Leather	4 December 2012	N/A
With the annual village show just around the corner, Rocket and Alli are dismayed to learn that their family is fostering two mysterious newcomers.
2	"Episode 2"	Dirk Campbell	Nick Leather	5 December 2012	N/A
Rocket wants justice after somebody vandalizes his wish cave. But his search for the truth uncovers more secrets than he anticipated.
3	"Episode 3"	Dirk Campbell	Nick Leather	6 December 2012	N/A
With just hours left in the doomsday prophecy, Alli and Rocket come closer to learning the truth about Casey and Lena.

=== Series 2 (2014) ===
No. in series	Title	Directed by	Written by	Original release date	Viewers (millions)
1	"Rocket Boulsworth and an Answer for Everything"	Dirk Campbell	Nick Leather	14 April 2014	N/A
Rocket finds an oracle that knows the answer to everything in the telephone box.
2	"Brandon and the Beast"	Dirk Campbell	Nick Leather	21 April 2014	N/A
Brandon is chased by a mysterious beast in the woods, which Rocket thinks might be the legendary tancath.
3	"The Fairy Queen"	Dirk Campbell	Nick Leather	28 April 2014	N/A
Jade meets a woman who says she is the queen of the fairies.
4	"The Golden Egg"	Dirk Campbell	Neil Jones	5 May 2014	N/A
Alli breaks a valuable egg from the school collection and tries to find a replacement.
5	"Alli and the Wish Friend"	Tessa Hoffe	Nick Leather	12 May 2014	N/A
Alli makes a wish for a friend, and is astounded when it comes true.
6	"Fallout"	Tessa Hoffe	Neil Jones	19 May 2014	N/A
Alli and Shada investigate an underground shelter, which is supposedly haunted.
7	"The Mermaid's Song"	Tessa Hoffe	Michelle Lipton	26 May 2014	N/A
Rocket, Jade and Brandon explore a cave in which a mermaid is said to reside.
8	"The Wolf Tree"	Tessa Hoffe	Nick Leather	2 June 2014	N/A
Rocket comes across a tree said to bring the dead to life.
9	"The Lost Boy"	Tessa Hoffe	Neil Jones	9 June 2014	N/A
Rocket and Dibber think the new foster boy, Archie, may be a child who went missing on the island many years ago.
10	"Rocket's Return"	Dirk Campbell	Nick Leather	16 June 2014	N/A
Rocket and friends are suspicious that Billy, a visitor to the Knot, may be a time-traveller.
11	"The Goblin Curse"	Dirk Campbell	Michelle Lipton	23 June 2014	N/A
Brandon mocks the goblin king and is in turn cursed.
12	"The Ballabungie Detective Agency"	Dirk Campbell	Neil Jones	30 June 2014	N/A
Rocket and friends form a detective agency to clear Brandon's name of a terrible crime.
13	"The Tearpot"	Dirk Campbell	Nick Leather	7 July 2014	N/A
Rocket and friends fill a magical teapot with tears which they believe will save the Knot foster home from closing.

=== Series 3 (2015) ===
No. in series	Title	Directed by	Written by	Original release date	Viewers (millions)
1	"Here Be Dragons"	Dirk Campbell	Neil Jones	21 September 2015	N/A
After Rocket discovers a giant fossil, new foster child Benjamin thinks he sees a real dragon. However, Rocket's reputation is put on the line when they go on a sunset hunt for the creature. Meanwhile, Brandon is torn over whether to reply to his mother when she decides to make contact with him.
2	"The Tell Stones"	Dirk Campbell	Neil Jones	28 September 2015	N/A
When Dibber cheats on a school presentation, he appears to become the target of ancient powers. As runic stones tell of disaster for the one he loves the most, he finds out that his mother is lying to him. When Charlie the horse falls ill, Alli realises that she does not have enough time for Lucas.
3	"The Broken Soldier"	Dirk Campbell	Nick Leather	5 October 2015	N/A
When Archie uncovers an old toy soldier under his bed, Jade worries that he might have brought the toy to life. While Dibber copes with spending more time with Bethany Summer, his suspicions grow that Benjamin is going to hurt Rocket.
4	"Madison The Vampire"	Dirk Campbell	Michelle Lipton	12 October 2015	N/A
Madison's sudden strange behaviour leads the Knot children to believe that she may be a vampire. When a chick goes missing on the farm, the gang acts quickly before she can hurt anyone else. Meanwhile, Rocket realises he might actually fancy Bethany Summer.
5	"Jade the Magnificent"	Paul Cotter	Scott Payne	19 October 2015	N/A
There's a storm at the Knot, lightning strikes and sends Jade flying. As strange things happen around Jade, she appears to have developed potentially dangerous magical powers. Meanwhile, Brandon decides to contact his mother, only for it to have an unexpected result.
6	"The Mirror of Morglaw"	Paul Cotter	Bede Blake	26 October 2015	N/A
A skeleton washes up on the Dirgelmor shore, uncovering the journal of Lord Loomis and his quest to find a mirror that reflects a person's true self. As Rocket goes on the hunt for this mirror, the whole group is put in danger when Benjamin's secret is revealed.
7	"Telling Porkies"	Paul Cotter	Elly Brewer	2 November 2015	N/A
A new energetic foster child, Izzy Wizzy, makes a noisy arrival at The Knot. However, it is not long before everyone wonders how much trouble she might cause. Meanwhile, Archie discovers the new pig on the farm can talk, but will only speak to him.
8	"The Selkie Boy"	Paul Cotter	Neil Jones	9 November 2015	N/A
Alli sits on the rocks, looking at her life plan - she is upset that so far she has not achieved her goals. However, a mythical and handsome Selkie might just have arrived to save her from her loneliness. Meanwhile, Izzy finds herself in more trouble when she loses one of Sarah's treasured rings.
9	"Mountain Post"	Paul Cotter	Nick Leather	16 November 2015	N/A
A lone postbox on top of Dirgelmor's only mountain is rumoured to be able to send letters to historical figures. But when Brandon uses it to send a letter to his mother, it leads to a big surprise for him.
10	"The Knights of Dirgelmor"	Dirk Campbell	Michelle Lipton	23 November 2015	N/A
Upset over Brandon's departure, Jade loses herself in a fantasy book about three knights who discover a castle. Jade seeks out her own castle and, to her amazement, three knights appear soon after. However, her joy turns to despair when she and Dibber are trapped by the mystical knights.
11	"Izzy Wizzy and The Weeping Oak"	Dirk Campbell	Elly Brewer	30 November 2015	N/A
Alli comes to a big decision, while Rocket believes Izzy Wizzy has been possessed by tree sprites and while he is trying to help he uncovers a huge secret she has been keeping from everyone - she is going deaf.
12–13	"Goodbye Island/The Dirgeldoor"	Dirk Campbell	Nick Leather	7 December 2015	N/A
Peter announces there will be no new foster children at the Knot. When Jade, Archie and Izzy Wizzy overhear that someone will be leaving the farm they search for the legendary Dirgeldoor to take them to their true home, a journey that will trap all of the Knot children deep within an abandoned mine and lead them to discover who really is leaving the island.
