= Shy & Lola =

British television series

- Written by: Amanda Coe; Emilie Robson; Alys Metcalf
- Directed by: Sam Donovan
- Starring: Hayley Squires; Bel Powley
- Country of origin: United Kingdom
- Original language: English
- No. of series: 1

Production
- Executive producers: Amanda Coe; Rachelle Constant; Petra Fried; Jo McClellan
- Producer: Nadia Jaynes
- Production company: Clerkenwell Films

Original release
- Network: BBC One

Shy & Lola is an upcoming six-part television drama for BBC One, starring Hayley Squires and Bel Powley. It is scheduled for broadcast in 2027.

== Premise ==
Two women in a coastal town in northern England become unexpectedly involved with local criminals.

== Cast ==
- Hayley Squires as Shy
- Bel Powley as Lola
- Amber Grappy
- Matthew McNulty
- Elizabeth Berrington
- Edward Bluemel
- Jordan Bolger
- Thomas Turgoose
- Joseph Ayre
- Melanie-Joyce Bermudez

== Production ==
=== Development ===
The series was announced in February 2026 and is based on the French television drama Cheyenne and Lola, and commissioned for BBC One and BBC iPlayer. It is written by Amanda Coe with additional episodes written by Emilie Robson and Alys Metcalf. Coe was also influenced by the work of the Coen Brothers for the series, saying that "I love the idea that you can create a world of its own that resonates with the real world but is very heightened and blackly comic”. It is produced by Clerkenwell Films with executive producers including Coe, Rachelle Constant, Petra Fried and Jo McClellan. Sam Donovan is lead director and Nadia Jaynes series producer. German network ZDF joined as associate producers in September 2026.

=== Casting ===
The cast is led by Hayley Squires as the eponymous Shy with Bel Powley as Lola. Describing their relationship in the roles, Squires said she and Powley "are quite different people but [which] mirrors the characters of Shy and Lola. They essentially fall platonically in love with each other on screen, which was a beautiful relationship to play out". The cast also includes Amber Grappy, Matthew McNulty, Elizabeth Berrington, Edward Bluemel, Jordan Bolger, Thomas Turgoose, Joseph Ayre and Melanie-Joyce Bermudez.

=== Filming ===
Set in Grimsby, filming locations also included Kingston-upon-Hull and Leeds. First-look images from filming were released to the media in September 2026.

== Broadcast ==
The series is scheduled for broadcast in 2027.
