= Sharon Rooney =

Scottish actress (born 1988)

- Born: 22 October 1988 (age 38); Glasgow, Scotland
- Education: University of Hull
- Occupations: Actress; comedian
- Years active: 2012–present
- Notable work: My Mad Fat Diary (2013–15); Two Doors Down (2013–17)

Sharon Rooney (born 22 October 1988) is a Scottish actress best known for her breakthrough role as Rae Earl in My Mad Fat Diary which earned her critical acclaim, and led to her casting as Sophie in Two Doors Down (2013; 2016–2017), Dawn in Brief Encounters, Miss Atlantis in the 2019 remake of Dumbo and Lawyer Barbie in the 2023 film Barbie. In 2024, she had recurring roles in both Daddy Issues and Nightsleeper, playing the roles of Catherine and Yasmin (Yas) Brown respectively.

In 2013, she was nominated for a BAFTA Scotland award in the Best Actor/Actress (Television) Category for her performance in My Mad Fat Diary. She has subsequently been nominated for a Royal Television Society Award, Broadcasting Press Guild Award and Young Scot Awards. In 2015, she won the Best Actor/Actress (Television) Award at the 2015 ceremony of BAFTA Scotland for My Mad Fat Diary, and in 2021 won a British Short Film Awards for Best Supporting Actress in Do No Harm.

== Early life ==
Rooney was born in Glasgow on 22 October 1988, and educated at Knightswood Secondary School. In an interview with Ayrshire Magazine, Rooney recalled "seeing a pantomime with her aunt" when she was young, and being "captivated by the people on stage". She described acting as something she "always spoke about" since then, and that when she was at school it "was all I talked about doing". During her time at school, Rooney claimed she treated every class as a performance, saying "school was a show for me" and that she "was always chatting, always the one to make people laugh, talking too much, being disruptive".

She left school at the age of 16 to pursue a career in acting, and enrolled on a three-year performing arts course followed by a degree in drama at Hull University.

== Career ==
=== Breakthrough (2013–2023) ===
Rooney began performing stand-up comedy, and toured with a play in various schools across Britain. Her first television role came when she was cast as Rae Earl, a young woman who is released from a psychiatric facility after four months, in the E4 teen comedy-drama series My Mad Fat Diary (2013–2015). The show was a success and earned Rooney a BAFTA nomination at the BAFTA Scotland awards. The Guardian's Sam Wollaston called Rooney's performance "natural, effortless and utterly believable". Rooney claimed she was "surprised" to be nominated for a BAFTA Scotland award, and claimed she was "dreading" attending the ceremony but confirmed it was not for the fear of not winning the award, claiming that by being nominated she felt she had "already won". The role also saw her nominated for a Royal Television Society award in 2014. She was also nominated in the Entertainment category at the 2014 Young Scot Awards.

In 2013, Rooney was cast to play the role of Sophie, the daughter of Christine O'Neal (played by Elaine C. Smith), in the BBC Scotland sitcom Two Doors Down. The pilot episode aired in December 2013, but was not picked up for full series until 2016, with Rooney returned to the role of Sophie. Rooney said that working with Elaine C. Smith was "a dream come true", saying that she "grew up watching people like Elaine, Johnnie and Alex on the television", claiming that you would "see them on the telly all the time, so to be in a room with them and hear all their stories was just brilliant". In 2017, after two series on Two Doors Down, Rooney announced her departure from the show, with her character Sophie being written out of the show to move to Wales with her recently born daughter Madison.

Rooney played a small part in the Sherlock episode "The Empty Hearse" in 2014. In July 2016, she appeared in the ITV drama series Brief Encounters, set in 1982 and revolving around four women who become involved in Ann Summers party planning. She played Miss Atlantis in the 2019 film Dumbo, in which she performed the song "Baby Mine". She played Nicola Walsh in Finding Alice in 2021. In 2021, she played the role of Shauna in the short film Do No Harm, a role which earned her a British Short Film Award for Best Supporting Actress.

=== Barbie and television (2023–present) ===
In 2023, Rooney was cast in the movie Barbie, playing the role of Lawyer Barbie alongside a cast including Margot Robbie, Ryan Gosling, Will Ferrell, Rhea Perlman and Ncuti Gatwa. It quickly became the highest grossing film worldwide following its release, taking in $1.5 billion at the box office. Rooney said that her casting in Barbie was "a dream", whilst acknowledging that the statement was "somewhat a cliché". She said that growing up, she "played with one of those doll houses when I was a little girl and now I am in one". Glamour described the role as a "stark departure" from Rooney's previous roles. In 2024, she was cast as Yasmin "Yas" Brown in the BBC One drama series Nightsleeper. She described the role as "one of the hardest jobs" she has had, but claimed she was interested in the role due to her interest in trains.

In August 2024, she was cast as Catherine in Daddy Issues, also on BBC One. She was appointed to be one of the judges at the 2024 Glasgow Comedy Festival alongside Janey Godley and Tony Curran, with the three judges being selected to decide on a recipient to present to comedian Billy Connolly to award the Sir Billy Connolly Spirit of Glasgow Award. Rooney said she was "excited" to be selected as a judge, and said "the Glasgow comedy scene is one of the best, and as a proud Glaswegian it's a joy to watch it get bigger and better each year".

Rooney appeared in the second series of The Celebrity Traitors in October 2026, where she gave herself the nickname "Poundland Poirot", due to her detective skills.

== Personal life ==
Despite her acting success, Rooney describes herself as a "shy person". She lives in Glasgow, saying she "loves being home", and describes herself as "such a home bird". She describes her situation as "the best part for me about going away is the coming home. The minute I’m done, I’m on the train and I’m straight home". Following the success of My Mad Fat Diary, Rooney said she "felt too much responsibility" regarding "anyone who has mental health issues, an eating disorder, or any problem" and claimed that she often had to think before speaking and posting things publicly.

== Filmography ==
Key
†	Denotes works that have not yet been released

=== Film ===
Year	Title	Role	Notes
2013	Under the Skin	Party Girl	
2015	Hector	Young Mother	
2019	Dumbo	Miss Atlantis	
2021	The Electrical Life of Louis Wain	Josephine Wain	
2021	Do No Harm	Shauna	Short film British Short Film Award – Won (Best Supporting Actress)
2023	Barbie	Lawyer Barbie	
2025	Grow	Sharon	

=== Television ===
Year	Title	Role	Notes
2013–2015	My Mad Fat Diary	Rae Earl	16 episodes BAFTA Scotland – Nominated for Best Actor/Actress (Television); Royal Television Society – Nominated for Best Actress; Broadcasting Press Guild – Nominated for Breakthrough Award; Young Scot Awards – Nominated for Entertainment Award; BAFTA Scotland – Won Best Actor/Actress (Television)
2014	Sherlock	Laura	Episode: "The Empty Hearse"
2014–2015	Mountain Goats	Jules	7 episodes
2016	Brief Encounters	Dawn	6 episodes
2016	Stag	Brodie	Miniseries
2013, 2016–2017	Two Doors Down	Sophie	Main role 13 episodes
2016–2018	Zapped	Barbara	15 episodes
2017–2018	The Tunnel	Kiki Stokes	4 episodes
2018	No Offence	Faye Caddy	4 episodes
2019	The Capture	Becky	6 episodes
2019–2023	Jerk	Ruth	8 episodes
2021	Finding Alice	Nicola	6 episodes
2021	McDonald & Dodds	Doreen Warren	Episode: "We Need To Talk About Doreen"
2022	The Teacher	Nina	4 episodes
2022	The Control Room	Breck	3 episodes
2024–present	Daddy Issues	Catherine	Recurring role; 12 episodes
2024	Nightsleeper	Yasmin (Yas) Brown	Recurring role; 6 episodes
2024	The Cleaner	Sue, Mrs Barton, Tippy, Cook, Jibbers, John Church, Lady Rice Phillips	Episode "The Housekeeper"
2025	The Revenge Club	Rachel Koffman	Main cast
2026	The Celebrity Traitors	Contestant; series 2	

== Awards and nominations ==
Year	Awards	Category	Work	Result
2013	British Academy Scotland Awards	Best New Scottish Actor/Actress	My Mad Fat Diary	Nominated
2013	Scottish Variety Awards	Best Actor/Actress (Television)	My Mad Fat Diary	Nominated
2014	British Academy Scotland Awards	Best Actor/Actress (Television)	My Mad Fat Diary	Nominated
2014	Royal Television Society	Best Actress	My Mad Fat Diary	Nominated
2014	Broadcasting Press Guild	Breakthrough Award	My Mad Fat Diary	Nominated
2014	Young Scot Awards	Entertainment Award	My Mad Fat Diary	Nominated
2015	British Academy Scotland Awards	Best Actor/Actress (Television)	My Mad Fat Diary	Won
2021	British Short Film Awards	Best Supporting Actress	Do No Harm	Won
