= Rhys Parry Jones =

Welsh actor

Rhys Parry Jones is a Welsh actor best known for his role as Llew Matthews in Pobol y Cwm, the title character in the S4C children's series Plismon Puw and as Rhacsyn from the children's series Rhacsyn a’r Goeden Hud. Jones has also featured in episodes of EastEnders, Tracy Beaker and the BBC Wales sitcom High Hopes as well as providing the voices of Patrick Star and Mr. Krabs in S4C's Welsh dubbing of SpongeBob SquarePants.

In late 2007, he appeared in Flick, a Welsh horror film co-starring Faye Dunaway, Hugh O'Conor and Michelle Ryan.

Based in Cardiff, Jones appears in the films Arwyr and Patagonia by Marc Evans, the latter set in Y Wladfa, which premiered at the Seattle International Film Festival on 10 June 2010.

In 2018, he portrayed John Le Mesurier in Amazon's A Very English Scandal. In 2019, he appeared in the Netflix series The Crown, in the season 3 episode "Aberfan". In 2026, he starred in Welsh comedy drama science-fiction film Out There.
