= Sarah Cameron Sunde =

Artist in New York

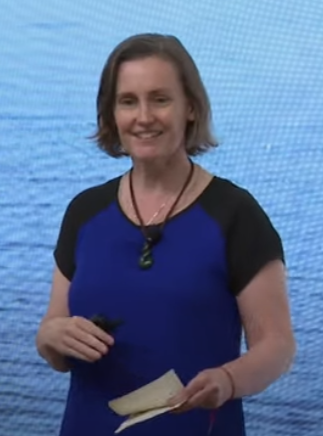
- Speaking at the World Economic Forum's Annual Meeting of the New Champions 2023
- Occupation: Artist
- Known for: 36.5 / A Durational Performance with the Sea

Sarah Cameron Sunde is an American, New York based interdisciplinary environmental artist. For the first 10 year of her career (1999–2010), she identified primarily as a theater maker and director, and was known internationally as the American-English translator and director of Norwegian playwright Jon Fosse's works. Though she continued theater making/directing through 2017, In 2010, her work shifted primarily to that of a time-based visual artist working at the intersection of public, performance, and video art, which she continues today. At this intersection, Sunde works site-specifically with duration and scale to examine the human relationship to deep time, the more-than-human world, and the environment.

Her most notable work to date is 36.5 / A Durational Performance with the Sea, a public, video, and performance artwork made in collaboration with water and communities across the world. 36.5 was made over nine years and across six continents (2013–2022). The durational video work created from these performances will continue to be worked with, explored, and exhibited through the foreseeable future.

== Career ==
=== 36.5 / A Durational Performance With the Sea ===
While visiting Maine in 2013, Sunde conceived a performance piece where she would stand at the edge of a body of water from low tide to low tide, allowing the water to rise from her feet, engulf her body, then fall back down again as a metaphor for sea level rise on a human being. Each of the nine iterations are made up of three main components: A physical, live performance, a livestreamed performance, and a timelapse and durational video work created from each performance.

Between 2013 and 2022 she staged nine performances on six different continents (Maine, Mexico, San Francisco, the Netherlands, Bangladesh, Brazil, Kenya, Aotearoa-New Zealand). Locations were chosen based on how affected they have been by sea level rise. The performances were a reaction to Hurricane Sandy, and the final performance occurred on September 14, 2022, in the New York Estuary in New York City (Astoria, Queens) At each location she invites community members to join her in the performance as well as in "environmental initiatives".

Notable partners and exhibitions of the work include: the Georgia Museum of Art, Athens, GA (2020), Gallatin Galleries, New York, NY (2020), Te Uru Gallery, Aotearoa-NZ (2020), Fort Jesus Museum and Cheche Gallery, Mombasa and Nairobi, Kenya (2019), Museu de Arte Moderna, MUSAS, Salvador, Brazil (2019), Britto Arts Space, Dhaka, Bangladesh (2017), and De Appel, and Oude Kerk, Netherlands (2015).

=== Works on Water ===
In 2017, Sunde instigated and co-founded Works on Water, a nonprofit, triennial, and experimental cultural organization that supports a community of artists working on, in, and with bodies of water. Works on Water's goal is to create a space for visual artists, theater-makers, scientists, and urban planners to collaborate across sectors and think in multidisciplinary ways about water.

=== Theatrical work: directing, translating, producing ===
From 2004 to 2014, Sunde directed and translated US debut productions of the work of 2023 Literature Nobel Prize Laureate Norwegian poet and playwright, Jon Fosse.

In 2004, Sunde translated and directed Fosse's Night Sings Its Songs at the Culture Project in New York City, and the following year she directed The Asphalt Kiss by Nelson Rodrigues at the Off-Broadway 59E59 Theaters. She directed her translation of Fosse's deathvariations in 2006 and SaKaLa in 2008. In 2009, she directed the world premiere of Jessica Dickey's The Amish Project and at the Rattlestick Playwrights Theater. In 2010, Sunde co-directed the world premiere of Marielle Heller's The Diary of a Teenage Girl at 3LD Art & Technology Center. She directed her translations of Fosse's A Summer Day at the Cherry Lane Theatre in 2012 and Dream of Autumn at Quantum Theater in Pittsburgh in 2013.

Sunde is a co-founder of both Oslo Elsewhere and the Translation Think Tank. She also served as the Deputy Artistic Director of New Georges from 2001 to 2017.

== Awards ==
- Guggenheim Fellow (2021)
- MAP Fund (2021, 2019)
- New York State Council on the Arts (2021)
- Robert & Gloria Hausman Theater Award, Princess Grace Fellowship in Directing (2005)
- Artist Award, American Scandinavian Society (2005)
