= The Diary of a Teenage Girl: An Account in Words and Pictures =

2002 book by Phoebe Gloeckner

- First edition
- Author: Phoebe Gloeckner
- Illustrator: Phoebe Gloeckner
- Language: English
- Subject: Adolescence
- Genre: Hybrid graphic novel
- Published: 2002
- Publisher: Frog Books
- Publication place: United States
- Media type: Paperback
- Pages: 312
- ISBN: 978-1583940631

Cover of The Diary of a Teenage Girl: An Account in Words and Pictures (first edition, 2002, North Atlantic Books, Berkeley, CA). Cover art by Phoebe Gloeckner.

The Diary of a Teenage Girl: An Account in Words and Pictures. Cover of revised edition (2015, North Atlantic Books, CA). Art by Phoebe Gloeckner, design by Carl Greene.

The Diary of a Teenage Girl: An Account in Words and Pictures is a diaristic graphic novel by author and artist Phoebe Gloeckner. It is notable for its hybrid form, composed of both prose and "comics" passages, each contributing to the narrative.

First published in 2002, the book has been called an "autobiography" or "semi-autobiography."

The story is told by its protagonist Minnie Goetze, a 15-year-old girl living in San Francisco, California. The year is 1976, and Minnie, the daughter of a young single mother, loses her virginity to her mother's boyfriend, Monroe Rutherford, and soon thereafter begins writing obsessively in her diary. As she careens towards coming-of-age, she searches for love but confuses it with sex. The book presents a complex and jarring look into the interior life of an adolescent girl, and has been described as raw and disturbing, not only because of its subject matter, but because of Minnie's frank and precociously intelligent point of view and commentary on the lives of the adults in her midst.

== Plot ==
Minnie Goetz is a 15-year-old girl living in San Francisco with her mother Charlotte, who was a teenager when Minnie was born, and her younger sister Gretel. Minnie begins keeping a diary after her mother's on-again, off-again boyfriend Monroe begins to make sexual advances towards her. Monroe takes her out drinking to a bar one day and initiates sex between them.

Minnie has mixed feelings about her relationship with Monroe, feeling attracted to him sexually but resenting the way he treats her and the secretive nature of their relationship. She longs to confide in her mother about Monroe but feels she cannot as Monroe and her mother still sleep together and she has a cold relationship with her mother as she once heard her step-father Pascal refer to her need to be held and touched by her mother as "sexual".

Minnie begins to sleep with more boys her own age but is disappointed and disillusioned to find that they make fun of her with their friends. She begins to spend more time with her friend Kimmie, who prostitutes herself to various friends and neighbors for petty cash. Through Kimmie, Minnie begins to take drugs for the first time.

Monroe begins a mail order business for diet pills. His goal is to be rich and retire by the time he is 40 which Minnie disapproves of as a goal. After listening to his motivational tapes she decides she wants to be a cartoonist. She writes a fan letter to Aline Kominsky-Crumb who writes one back to her. Minnie also begins skipping more classes and is thrown out of school for her poor attendance. She is forced to attend a public school and is only accepted on a trial basis on the strength of her artistic talents.

Minnie confesses to Monroe that she loves him and he does not reciprocate, causing her to feel angry towards him. Whenever she tries to initiate sex he has her perform oral sex on him which Minnie finds unsatisfying. Minnie's step-father Pascal tells Minnie's mother that he believes that Monroe has sexual intentions towards Minnie. Monroe convinces Minnie's mother, Charlotte, that the beliefs are unfounded. Pascal then tells Minnie he is leaving for New York, but promises to always stay in touch telling Minnie he thinks of her and Gretel as his children.

While out with her friends Minnie meets Tabatha, a teenage lesbian hustler. Minnie feels attracted to Tabatha though her friends warn her against spending time with her. Minnie continues to skip school and is given a therapist to whom she confesses her relationship with Monroe.

Minnie's mother discovers her diary and confronts Minnie and Monroe about their relationship. She tells Monroe he must marry her daughter and Monroe agrees though Minnie thinks the idea is ridiculous. She begins spending time at Monroe's apartment with her mother's consent. One of her friends confides in her that she slept with Pascal and Minnie is angered and hurt that he would sleep with someone her age. She runs away with Tabatha who gives her roofies and allows her to be raped in exchange for pills. Minnie finally returns home. She stops taking drugs and drinking for two months and starts to attend school. She convinces her mother not to bring Monroe to their home anymore but is hurt by the knowledge that her mother continues to see Monroe on the side.

Meeting one of her friends she decides to get high one more time with the crystal meth left over in her purse. She and her friend compose and sell poems by the beach while they are tripping and Minnie sees Monroe who is out jogging. She sells him one of her poems and the two say their goodbyes.

== Reception ==
Whitney Joiner of Salon.com wrote, "The Diary of a Teenage Girl is one of the most brutally honest, shocking, tender and beautiful portrayals of growing up in America.” Michael Martin of nerve.com described the book as “the most honest depiction of sexuality in a long, long time; as a meditation on adolescence, it picks up a literary ball that’s been only fitfully carried after Salinger.” Comedian and author Rob Delaney said, "There are no better memoirs than Phoebe Gloeckner’s A Child's Life and Other Stories (her first book) [and] Diary Of A Teenage Girl". Peggy Orenstein wrote in a New York Times Magazine profile on Gloeckner that she "is creating some of the edgiest work about young women's lives in any medium". In 2014, The Diary of a Teenage Girl was named one of the "best 50 non-super-hero graphic novels" by Rolling Stone magazine.

== Adaptation ==
Director Marielle Heller adapted the book for both the stage in 2010 and for the screen in 2015. The film The Diary of a Teenage Girl, starring Bel Powley, Alexander Skarsgard, and Kristen Wiig, was acquired by Sony Pictures Classics for distribution and was broadly released August 7, 2015.

== Re-release ==
A revised edition of the book, including a preface by comics scholar Hillary Chute, a foreword by the author, and a selection of the author's personal photos and original diary pages, was released by North Atlantic Books in July 2015.
