= Phoebe Gloeckner =

American artist

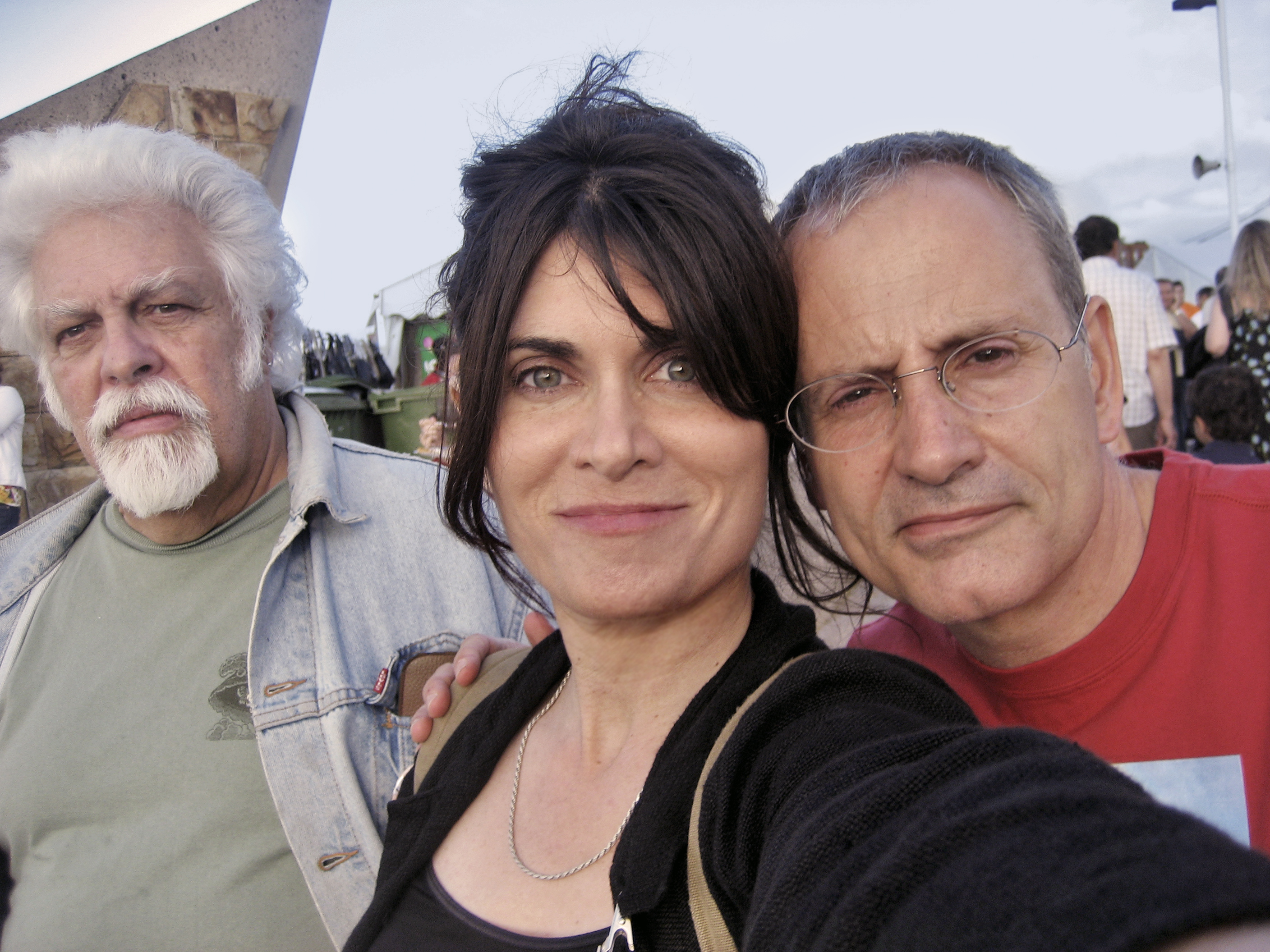
- Gloeckner (center) with Spain Rodriguez (left) and Ángel de la Calle in 2009
- Born: Phoebe Louise Adams Gloeckner; December 22, 1960 (age 65); Philadelphia, Pennsylvania, U.S.
- Occupations: Artist; graphic novelist; medical illustrator
- Years active: 1988–present
- Known for: A Child's Life and Other Stories
- Notable work: The Diary of a Teenage Girl: An Account in Words and Pictures
- Children: 2
- Website: phoebegloeckner.com

Phoebe Louise Adams Gloeckner (born December 22, 1960) is an American cartoonist, illustrator, painter, and novelist.

== Early life ==
Gloeckner was born in Philadelphia, Pennsylvania. Her mother was a librarian and her father, David Gloeckner, was a commercial illustrator. Her father's family was Quaker and she attended Quaker schools when she was young. She has a younger sister.

Gloeckner's parents divorced when she was 4 years old. In 1972, when she was 11 or 12 years old, her mother remarried and the family moved to San Francisco. She attended several Bay Area schools, including The Urban School of San Francisco and Lick-Wilmerding High School. She was a boarding student at Castilleja (in Palo Alto) for a year, but returned to San Francisco to live with her mother, her mother's boyfriend, and her sister, when she was 14.

Gloeckner began cartooning at the age of 12. Because her mother was dating Robert Armstrong, a cartoonist in Robert Crumb's band Cheap Suit Serenaders, she met many San Francisco underground comics figures who had a profound influence upon her, including Crumb, Aline Kominsky, Bill Griffith, Terry Zwigoff, and Diane Noomin.

Gloeckner attended San Francisco State University from 1980 to 1985, where she was a pre-med student and studied French and art. She spent the 1983–1984 academic year in Université d’Aix-Marseille studying art, French, and biology, and from 1984 to 1985 spent about six months studying Czech and literature at Charles University in Prague. She has an M.A. in Biomedical Communications from University of Texas Southwestern Medical Center at Dallas, which she received in 1988. The degree was in medical illustration. Her 1987 dissertation was on the "Semiotic Analysis of Medical Illustration," in which she studies narrative devices used in medical and surgical illustration.

Gloeckner became interested in medical illustration through her maternal grandfather, an antique dealer who collected and sold old books, and her paternal grandmother, Dr. Louise Carpenter Gloeckner, who was a physician in Philadelphia and was the first woman to be elected vice president of the American Medical Association.

== Career ==
Gloeckner worked prolifically as a medical illustrator from 1988, and her training is evident in her paintings and comics art, which are highly detailed and often prominently feature the human body. Her first prominent work in fiction publishing, a series of illustrations for the RE/Search edition of J. G. Ballard's novel The Atrocity Exhibition, used clinical images of internal anatomy, sex, and physical trauma in ambiguous and evocative combinations.

Her early comics work, in the form of short stories published in a variety of underground anthologies including Wimmen's Comix, Weirdo, Young Lust, and Twisted Sisters, and in the tabloid zine, RE/Search (numbered volumes), was sporadic and rarely seen until the 1998 release of the collection A Child's Life and Other Stories. This was followed by her 2002 graphic novel The Diary of a Teenage Girl: An Account in Words and Pictures, which revisited the troubled life of the young character (usually referred to as "Minnie Goetze") previously featured in some of her comics, this time in an unusual combination of prose, illustration, and short comics scenes.

Her novel and many of her short stories are semi-autobiographical, a frequent cause of comment due to their depiction of sex, drug use, and childhood traumas; however, Gloeckner has stated that she regards them as fiction. Sexual content led to A Child's Life and Other Stories being banned from the public library in Stockton, California, after it was checked out by an 11-year-old reader. The mayor of Stockton called the book "a how-to book for pedophiles." The graphic novel was also classified as pornography and refused entry by customs officials in both France and England.

Less controversial, and actually intended for children, is the book Weird Things You Can Grow, published by Random House, and books in the series beginning with Tales Too Funny to be True published by HarperCollins, for which she did the illustrations.

A film version of The Diary of a Teenage Girl premiered at the 2015 Sundance Film Festival. The film was acquired by Sony Pictures Classics at the festival. Adapted and directed by Marielle Heller, it is based on Heller's earlier stage adaptation. The film stars Alexander Skarsgård as Monroe, Kristen Wiig as Charlotte, and Bel Powley as the main character, Minnie Goetze. Heller developed the script at the Sundance Institute's Sundance Feature Film Program Lab. The film won "Best First Feature" at the 2016 Spirit Awards.

Gloeckner briefly taught courses at Suffolk Community College and Stony Brook University.

Gloeckner is an associate professor at the University of Michigan Stamps School of Art & Design, a position she has held since 2010.

In recognition of her contributions to the comic art form, ComicsAlliance listed Gloeckner as one of twelve women cartoonists deserving of lifetime achievement recognition.

== Personal life ==
In 1986, Gloeckner married Czech artist Jakub Kalousek. They later divorced. She has two daughters, Audrey "Fina" Gloeckner-Kalousek and Persephone Gloeckner-Kalousek.

== Awards ==
- 2000: Inkpot Award
- 2008: Guggenheim fellowship working on research for a graphic novel about families living in Ciudad Juárez; project inspired by experiences in Ciudad Juarez while researching her story in the 2008 book, I Live Here
- 2015-2016: Faculty Fellow in the University of Michigan Institute for the Humanities working on “The Return of Maldoror”
- 2025: Inducted into The Will Eisner Award Hall of Fame

== Works and publications ==
=== Monographs ===
- Gloeckner, Phoebe, and Robert Crumb (introduction). A Child's Life and Other Stories. Berkeley, CA: Frog (imprint of North Atlantic Books), 1998. ISBN 978-1-883-31971-7 OCLC 440624684 Revised edition, 2000. ISBN 978-1-583-94028-0 OCLC 43954012
- Gloeckner, Phoebe. The Diary of a Teenage Girl: An Account in Words and Pictures. Berkeley, Calif: Frog (imprint of North Atlantic Books), 2002. ISBN 978-1-583-94080-8 OCLC 41315413 Revised edition, 2015. ISBN 978-1-623-17034-9 OCLC 905685506

=== As contributing author/artist ===
- "RE/Search" tabloid zine #2 and #3. San Francisco: RE/Search Publications, 1980–81.
- Kirshner, Mia, Mike Simons, and Paul Shoebridge. "I Live Here." NY: Pantheon Graphic Novels, 2008. ISBN 978-0375424786

=== Journals ===
- Gloeckner, Phoebe. "Autobiography: The Process Negates the Term." Chaney, Michael A. Graphic Subjects: Critical Essays on Autobiography and Graphic Novels. Madison, Wisconsin: The University of Wisconsin Press, 2011. ISBN 978-0-299-25104-8 OCLC 665064402
- Gloeckner, Phoebe, Justin Green, Aline Kominsky-Crumb and Carol Tyler. 2014. "Panel: Comics and Autobiography". Critical Inquiry. 40, no. 3: Comics & Media. The University of Chicago Press. Edited by Hillary Chute and Patrick Jagoda: Spring 2014. pp. 86–103. doi:10.1086/677333 ISSN 0093-1896 OCLC 5595984793]
- Gloeckner, Phoebe. 2014. "Valiente and Arpía". Critical Inquiry. 40, no. 3: Comics & Media. The University of Chicago Press. Edited by Hillary Chute and Patrick Jagoda: Spring 2014. pp. 182–186. doi:10.1086/677341 ISSN 0093-1896 OCLC 5595981436
- Gloeckner, Phoebe. Author Guillermo Paxton: An Interview with "El Guëro de Juárez". 2015.

=== Children's books ===
- Goldenberg, Janet, and Phoebe Gloeckner. Weird Things You Can Grow. New York: Random House, 1994. ISBN 978-0-679-85298-8 OCLC 29428087
- Goldenberg, Janet, and Phoebe Gloeckner. Weird But True: A Cartoon Encyclopedia of Incredibly Strange Things. New York: HarperTrophy, 1997. ISBN 978-0-064-46190-0 OCLC 37565364
- Daly-Weir, Catherine, and Phoebe Gloeckner. The Exploding Toilet and Other Tales Too Funny to Be True. New York: HarperCollins, 1998. ISBN 978-0-064-40702-1 OCLC 39275701
- Busby, Cylin, and Phoebe Gloeckner. The Chicken-Fried Rat: Tales Too Gross to Be True. New York: HarperCollins, 1998. ISBN 978-0-064-40701-4 OCLC 39275702
- Gilson, Kristin, and Phoebe Gloeckner. The Baby-Sitter's Nightmare: Tales Too Scary to Be True. New York: HarperCollins, 1998. ISBN 978-0-064-40700-7 OCLC 39275700

=== Illustration work ===
- Ballard, J. G. The Atrocity Exhibition. San Francisco, CA: RE/Search Publications, 1990. ISBN 978-1-889-30703-9 OCLC 228289312
- Juno, Andrea, and V. Vale, editors. Angry Women. San Francisco, CA: RE/Search Publications, 1991. 13. ISBN 978-0-940-64224-9 OCLC 773520413 Revised edition. New York, NY: Juno Books, 1999. ISBN 978-1-890-45105-9 OCLC 44429986
- Spinrad, Paul. The RE/Search Guide to Bodily Fluids. San Francisco, CA: RE/Search Publications, 1999. ISBN 978-1-890-45104-2 OCLC 62598302
- Winks, Cathy, Anne Semans, and Cathy Winks. The Good Vibrations Guide to Sex: The Most Complete Sex Manual Ever Written. San Francisco: Cleis Press, 2002. ISBN 978-1-573-44158-2 OCLC 50613863

== See also ==
- The Diary of a Teenage Girl
- The Diary of a Teenage Girl: An Account in Words and Pictures
- Wimmen's Comix
- Weirdo
- Autobiographical comics
