= A Royal Night Out =

2015 film by Julian Jarrold

- Theatrical release poster
- Directed by: Julian Jarrold
- Written by: Trevor de Silva; Kevin Hood
- Produced by: Robert Bernstein; Douglas Rae
- Starring: Sarah Gadon; Bel Powley; Jack Reynor; Rupert Everett; Emily Watson; Roger Allam
- Cinematography: Christophe Beaucarne
- Edited by: Luke Dunkley
- Music by: Paul Englishby
- Production companies: Ecosse Films; Filmgate Films; Scope Pictures
- Distributed by: Lionsgate
- Release date: 8 May 2015
- Running time: 97 minutes
- Country: United Kingdom
- Language: English
- Box office: $5,1 million

A Royal Night Out is a 2015 British romantic comedy-drama film directed by Julian Jarrold and written by Trevor de Silva and Kevin Hood. The film stars Sarah Gadon as the teenaged Princess Elizabeth, who, with younger sister Princess Margaret (Bel Powley), ventures out of Buckingham Palace to enjoy the VE Day celebrations.

== Plot ==
On VE Day – 8 May 1945 – as London celebrates the end of World War II in Europe and peace being declared across the continent, Princesses Elizabeth and Margaret are allowed to join the celebrations, against the Queen's wishes. The King, impressed by Elizabeth's pleading, asks her to report back on the people's feelings towards him and his midnight speech on the radio.

Each girl, incognito, is chaperoned by an army officer with an itinerary to be back at Buckingham Palace by 1 a.m. Soon realizing the Queen's planned itinerary does not fulfill their expectations of fun and meeting the ordinary people, Margaret is the first to slip away from her escort, followed by Elizabeth.

The princesses are separated on two different buses. Margaret is befriended by a naval officer seeking to take advantage of what he believes is just an ordinary girl, and Elizabeth by an airman named Jack who is absent without leave.

Margaret is led by her naval officer into a world of Soho nightclubs, gambling, spiked drinks and brothels. Elizabeth and her airman have their own adventures trying to catch up with Margaret, which take them far beyond the 1 a.m. deadline into the early hours of the following morning.

Elizabeth and Jack, while dancing, are interrupted by military police, who apprehend Jack. However, Elizabeth identifies herself as a princess, and asks that Jack be let go. The two go to the Palace and have breakfast; the King, after initial scepticism, shakes Jack's hand and thanks him for taking care of Elizabeth. Elizabeth drives Jack back to his barracks before his 8 a.m. mandatory parade time; he gives her a quick kiss. She drives away, smiling.

== Cast ==
- Sarah Gadon as Princess Elizabeth
- Bel Powley as Princess Margaret
- Jack Reynor as Jack Hodges
- Rupert Everett as King George VI
- Emily Watson as Queen Elizabeth
- Roger Allam as Stan
- Ruth Sheen as Joan Hodges
- Jack Gordon as Lieutenant Burridge
- Jack Laskey as Lieutenant Pryce
- Geoffrey Streatfield as Jeffers
- Sophia Di Martino as Phoebe

The character of Pryce is credited as a Lieutenant, but is shown as, and referred to as, Captain Pryce throughout the film.

== Relation to actual events ==
The two officer escorts and the airman in the screenplay are fictional. In truth, the princesses went out at 10:00 PM in an organised group of 16, mingled with revellers, and returned to Buckingham Palace at 1:00 a.m.

Queen Elizabeth later spoke of the night and referring to it as one of the most remarkable in her life.

== Release ==
A Royal Night Out was released in the United Kingdom on 8 May 2015 and on DVD on 7 September 2015. The film was released in the United States on 4 December 2015 and released on DVD on 3 May 2016.

== Critical reception ==
On the review aggregator website Rotten Tomatoes, 75% of 76 critics' reviews are positive, with an average rating of 5.8/10. The website's consensus reads: "Undeniably slight yet thoroughly charming, A Royal Night Out uses a fascinating historical footnote as a springboard into a fun dramedy diversion." Metacritic reports a 58 out of 100 rating, based on 17 critics, indicating "mixed or average reviews".
