= The Diary of a Teenage Girl =

- Theatrical release poster
- Directed by: Marielle Heller
- Screenplay by: Marielle Heller
- Based on: The Diary of a Teenage Girl: An Account in Words and Pictures by Phoebe Gloeckner
- Produced by: Miranda Bailey; Anne Carey; Bert Hamelinck; Madeline Samit
- Starring: Bel Powley; Alexander Skarsgård; Christopher Meloni; Kristen Wiig
- Cinematography: Brandon Trost
- Edited by: Marie-Hélène Dozo; Koen Timmerman
- Music by: Nate Heller
- Production companies: Archer Gray Productions; Caviar; Cold Iron Pictures
- Distributed by: Sony Pictures Classics
- Release dates: January 24, 2015 (Sundance); August 7, 2015 (United States)
- Running time: 102 minutes
- Country: United States
- Language: English
- Budget: $2 million
- Box office: $2.3 million

The Diary of a Teenage Girl is a 2015 American comedy-drama film written and directed by Marielle Heller, based on the hybrid novel of the same name by Phoebe Gloeckner. It stars Bel Powley as a 15-year-old girl in 1970s San Francisco who becomes sexually active by starting a relationship with her mother's boyfriend. It also stars Kristen Wiig, Alexander Skarsgård, Christopher Meloni, Quinn Nagle, and Austin Lyon. It premiered at the 2015 Sundance Film Festival and had a limited release on August 7, 2015, by Sony Pictures Classics.

== Plot ==
In 1976 San Francisco, 15-year-old aspiring cartoonist Minnie Goetze begins keeping an audio diary. She is stirred by her awakening sexuality and wants to lose her virginity. She fears she may be unattractive.

When Minnie's bohemian mother Charlotte is too busy to go out with her boyfriend Monroe, she suggests he take Minnie out instead. At a bar, they flirt and she tells him she wants to sleep with him. They begin meeting at his apartment and having sex. She shares the details of her sexual experiences with her friend Kimmie, and records them in her audio diary.

At a comic book store, Minnie sees cartoonist Aline Kominsky signing books. She mails Aline her first comic, about a woman walking through town.

Minnie sleeps twice with her schoolmate Ricky, but he finds her sexual enthusiasm intimidating. At a bar, Minnie and Kimmie decide to pose as prostitutes. They fellate two boys in the bathroom, but the next day they agree it was a bad choice. Minnie's stepfather, Pascal, calls from New York City and invites Minnie to live with him, but she declines.

Charlotte loses her job as a librarian, so Minnie and her younger sister Gretel ask Pascal for money, and though he is irritated, he sends the family a check. After a wild party, Minnie, Kimmie, and Monroe have a threesome. As Minnie seems bothered by the encounter, Kimmie later announces that it was a one-off and, she adds, it's not as if Minnie loves Monroe.

Minnie realizes that she does love Monroe and tells him so. She becomes increasingly uncomfortable with her affair, and Monroe keeps breaking it off, saying it's wrong to continue having sex. Yet when she wants sex, he acts too tired or pushes her down to give him a blow job. Her own satisfaction is a minor consideration.

Minnie confronts Monroe, but he says he didn't sleep the night before and needs a nap. Minnie is annoyed but lets him climb into bed with her. He coaxes her into talking dirty about a guy she met at the cinema and then asks if it would hurt her if they were to have sex.

After they have sex and take acid together, Minnie sees herself covered in feathers and flying, but Monroe has a bad trip, convinced they are being watched. During the trip he tells Minnie he loves her and she realizes that she no longer cares for him. Monroe begins making plans for them to be together when she is 18, but Minnie leaves.

While Charlotte grows suspicious of the relationship between Minnie and Monroe, he convinces her that she is imagining things. However, Charlotte discovers Minnie's audio diary and confronts them. She decides that Minnie and Monroe must now marry, which he agrees to. Minnie runs away from home in disgust and begins seeing a risk-taking lesbian, Tabatha. When Tabatha brings her to a drug dealer, having told him that Minnie will have sex with him for drugs, Minnie returns to her family.

Minnie finds a letter from Aline encouraging her to draw more comics. Selling her comics and zines on the beach, Minnie runs into Monroe. She is cold towards him, and they go their separate ways. She reflects on her emotional growth and realizes that the only way to find happiness is by loving herself, not by depending on another person's affection.

== Cast ==
- Bel Powley as Minnie Goetze
- Kristen Wiig as Charlotte Worthington
- Alexander Skarsgård as Monroe Rutherford
- Christopher Meloni as Pascal MacCorkill
- Austin Lyon as Ricky Wasserman
- Madeleine Waters as Kimmie Minter
- Margarita Levieva as Tabatha
- Quinn Nagle as Chuck Saunders
- Abigail Wait as Gretel
- John Parsons as Burt
- Susanna Schulman as Aline Kominsky (voice)

== Production ==
=== Development ===
Writer and director Heller received Phoebe Gloeckner's graphic novel The Diary of a Teenage Girl as a Christmas gift from her younger sister in 2007. Of the book, Heller said it "just lit something up inside of me when I first read it. It felt closer to capturing what a real teenage girl feels than anything I'd ever read. And there is such a void onscreen of the voices of authentic teenage girls." Over the next few years Heller adapted the graphic novel into a play, in which she played the lead role. Gloeckner gave her consent to Heller's stage adaptation after attending a read-through, saying "[Marielle] created something so moving, and it was the first time I had seen the characters in three dimensions. It was like being in a hologram, seeing ghosts from my past wandering around."

The play was originally conceived with Rachel Eckerling and then developed from 2007 to 2010 with Eckerling and Sarah Cameron Sunde. Sunde and Eckerling went on to co-direct the full production. The Diary of a Teenage Girl play premiered at 3LD Arts and Technology Center, produced by Aaron Louis in association with New Georges and The Essentials. The production design functioned as an immersive theatrical experience with a carpeted sunken living room and pillows for the audience to sit on, and video and actors' actions took place in a full surround environment. It was critically acclaimed and ran for six weeks in March–April 2010. In adapting the book into a film, Heller went through "roughly 85 drafts" of the script.

=== Filming ===
On January 10, 2014, Kristen Wiig, Alexander Skarsgård, and Bel Powley were reported to have joined the cast of the film as leads. Powley auditioned for the role of Minnie by submitting a tape from England in which she did an American accent throughout, convincing Heller she actually was American. Caviar co-financed with Cold Iron Pictures, and co-produced with Archer Gray Productions. Principal photography began on January 10, 2014, in San Francisco, California, and continued into February. The production participated in the San Francisco "Scene in San Francisco Incentive Program" administered by the San Francisco Film Commission.

== Release ==
The film had its world premiere at the Sundance Film Festival on January 24, 2015. Shortly after, it was announced Sony Pictures Classics had acquired distribution rights to the film in North and Latin America, Australia, New Zealand, Eastern Europe excluding Russia, Asia, Scandinavia, Germany and Austria. The film was given a limited release on August 7, 2015.

In the UK, the film was the subject of some controversy after the film was given an 18 rating by the BBFC (equivalent to an NC-17 in the United States) as opposed to a 15 (equivalent to an R).

=== Critical reception ===
On review aggregator Rotten Tomatoes, the film holds an approval rating of 95% based on 165 reviews, with an average rating of 8.00/10. The website's critics consensus reads: "Boldly unconventional and refreshingly honest, Diary of a Teenage Girl is a frank coming-of-age story that addresses its themes—and its protagonist—without judgment." On Metacritic, the film has a weighted average score of 87 out of 100, based on 35 critics, indicating "universal acclaim".

Indiewire described the film as "genuine, poignant and hilarious." The Guardian gave it five out of five stars and called it "morally complex and sometimes uncomfortably close to the bone, but also lushly bawdy and funny, and packaged together with an astonishing degree of cinematic brio." Emily St. James of Vox praised the movie for being "quietly radical", describing it as "a story of huge emotions and big moments, told via intimate gestures and tiny power shifts".

== Accolades ==
Award	Date of ceremony	Category	Recipient(s)	Result	Ref.
Alliance of Women Film Journalists	January 12, 2016	Best Woman Director	Marielle Heller	Won	
Alliance of Women Film Journalists	January 12, 2016	Best Woman Screenwriter	Marielle Heller	Nominated	
Alliance of Women Film Journalists	January 12, 2016	Best Breakthrough Performance	Bel Powley	Nominated	
Alliance of Women Film Journalists	January 12, 2016	Best Depiction of Nudity, Sexuality, or Seduction	The Diary of a Teenage Girl	Nominated	
Austin Film Critics Association	December 29, 2015	Best First Film	The Diary of a Teenage Girl	Nominated	
Berlin International Film Festival	February 15, 2015	Crystal Bear for the Best Film of the Generation 14plus	The Diary of a Teenage Girl	Nominated	
Berlin International Film Festival	February 15, 2015	Grand Prix of the Generation 14plus	The Diary of a Teenage Girl	Won	
Boston Society of Film Critics	December 11, 2015	Best New Filmmaker	Marielle Heller	Won	
Chicago Film Critics Association	December 16, 2015	Most Promising Filmmaker	Marielle Heller	Nominated	
Chicago Film Critics Association	December 16, 2015	Most Promising Performer	Bel Powley	Nominated	
Detroit Film Critics Society	December 14, 2015	Best Actress	Bel Powley	Nominated	
Detroit Film Critics Society	December 14, 2015	Breakthrough Artist	Bel Powley	Nominated	
Directors Guild of America Awards	February 6, 2016	Outstanding Directing – First-Time Feature Film	Marielle Heller	Nominated	
Dorian Awards	January 19, 2016	Unsung Film of the Year	The Diary of a Teenage Girl	Nominated	
Edinburgh International Film Festival	June 28, 2015	Best International Feature Film	The Diary of a Teenage Girl	Won	
Edinburgh International Film Festival	June 28, 2015	Audience Award	The Diary of a Teenage Girl	2nd Runner-up	
Empire Awards	March 20, 2016	Best Female Newcomer	Bel Powley	Nominated	
FEST (film festival)	March 6, 2016	Best Film	The Diary of a Teenage Girl	Won	
FEST (film festival)	March 6, 2016	Best Director	Marielle Heller	Won	
Florida Film Critics Circle	December 23, 2015	Pauline Kael Breakout Award	Bel Powley	Nominated	
Gijón International Film Festival	November 28, 2015	Best Production Design	Jonah Markowitz	Won	
Gijón International Film Festival	November 28, 2015	Best Film	The Diary of a Teenage Girl	Nominated	
Gotham Awards	November 30, 2015	Best Feature	The Diary of a Teenage Girl	Nominated	
Gotham Awards	November 30, 2015	Breakthrough Director	Marielle Heller	Nominated	
Gotham Awards	November 30, 2015	Best Screenplay	Marielle Heller	Nominated	
Gotham Awards	November 30, 2015	Best Actress	Bel Powley	Won	
Gotham Awards	November 30, 2015	Audience Award	The Diary of a Teenage Girl	Nominated	
Guild of Music Supervisors Awards	January 21, 2016	Best Music Supervision for Film Budgeted Under 5 Million Dollars	Howard Paar	Won	
Independent Spirit Awards	February 27, 2016	Best Female Lead	Bel Powley	Nominated	
Independent Spirit Awards	February 27, 2016	Best First Screenplay	Marielle Heller	Nominated	
Independent Spirit Awards	February 27, 2016	Best First Feature	The Diary of a Teenage Girl	Won	
IndieWire Critics Poll	December 14, 2015	Best First Feature	The Diary of a Teenage Girl	Runner-up	
IndieWire Critics Poll	December 14, 2015	Best Lead Actress	Bel Powley	8th place	
Kansas City Film Critics Circle	December 20, 2015	Best Actress	Bel Powley	Nominated	
Palm Springs International Film Festival	January 3, 2015	Directors to Watch	Marielle Heller	Won	
San Francisco Bay Area Film Critics Circle	December 12, 2015	Best Screenplay – Adapted	Marielle Heller	Nominated	
Sundance Film Festival	February 1, 2015	U.S. Grand Jury Prize: Dramatic	The Diary of a Teenage Girl	Nominated	
Sundance Film Festival	February 1, 2015	Cinematography Award: U.S. Dramatic	Brandon Trost	Won	
Village Voice Film Poll	December 16, 2015	Best First Feature	The Diary of a Teenage Girl	Won	
Women Film Critics Circle	December 17, 2015	Best Movie by a Woman	The Diary of a Teenage Girl	Nominated	
Women Film Critics Circle	December 17, 2015	Mommie Dearest Worst Screen Mom of the Year Award	Kristen Wiig	Nominated	
Women Film Critics Circle	December 17, 2015	Best Young Actress	Bel Powley	Nominated	
Women's Image Network Awards	February 10, 2016	Outstanding Actress Feature Film	Bel Powley	Nominated	
Women's Image Network Awards	February 10, 2016	Outstanding Feature Film	The Diary of a Teenage Girl	Won	
Zurich Film Festival	October 4, 2015	Best International Feature Film	The Diary of a Teenage Girl	Special Mention	
