= Marielle Heller =

American actress, director, and writer

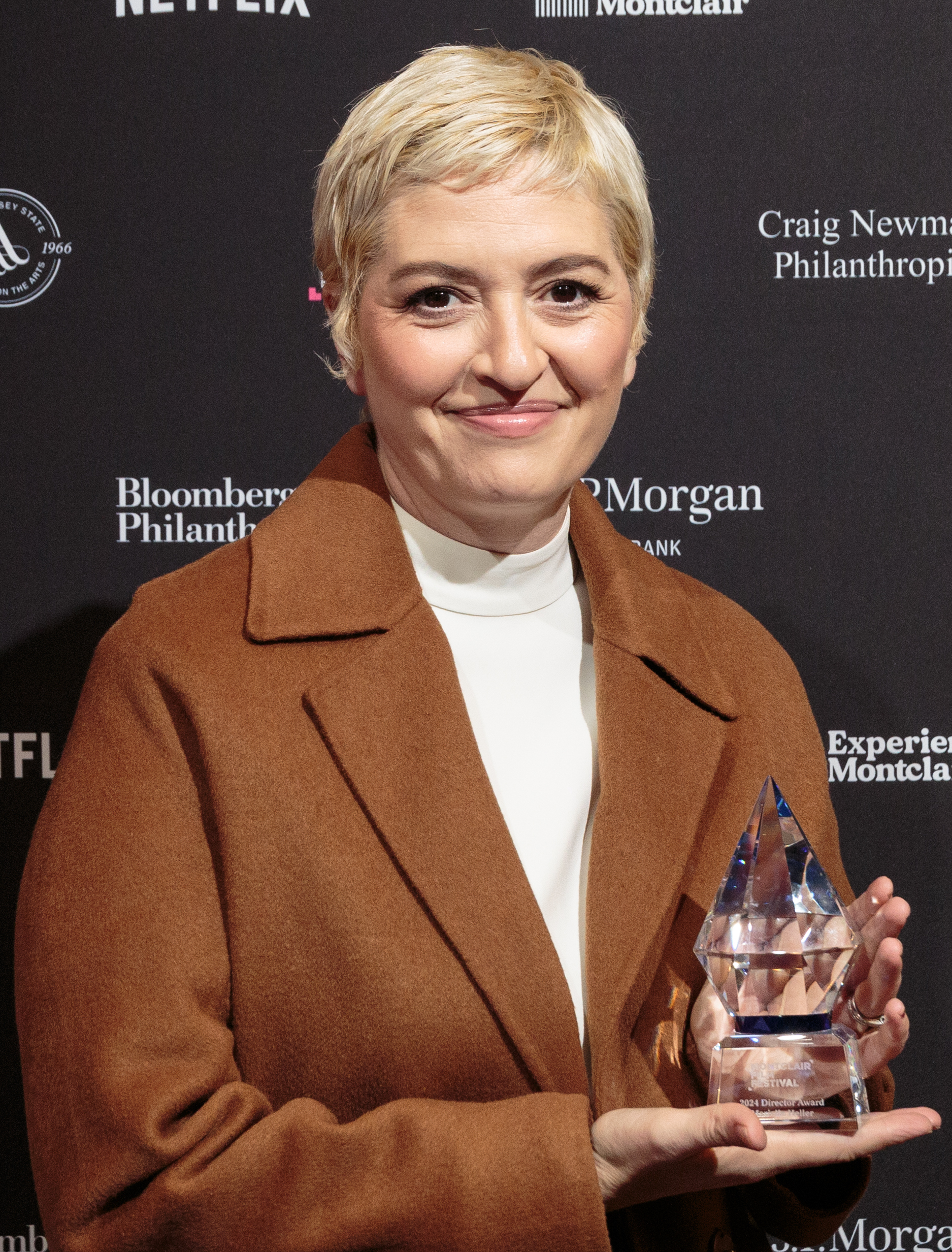
- Heller in 2024
- Born: Marielle Stiles Heller; October 1, 1979 (age 47); Marin County, California, U.S.
- Occupations: Actress; director; writer
- Years active: 2000–present
- Spouse: Jorma Taccone (m. 2007)
- Children: 2
- Relatives: Emily Heller (sister)

Marielle Stiles Heller /ˈmɑːriɛl/ (born October 1, 1979) is an American actress, director, and screenwriter. She is best known for directing the films The Diary of a Teenage Girl (2015), Can You Ever Forgive Me? (2018), and A Beautiful Day in the Neighborhood (2019), as well as acting in The Queen's Gambit (2020).

== Early life ==
Heller was born in Marin County, California, to Steve Heller, a chiropractor, and Annie Stiles-Heller, an artist and art teacher. She grew up in nearby Alameda, along with her younger brother and sister, Nate and Emily. Her father hails from a Jewish family in New York. Heller started off as an actor, calling acting her "first love." She was part of the Alameda Children's Musical Theater, where she participated in as many as four plays a year, including the roles of Rabbit in Winnie the Pooh, Templeton the rat in Charlotte's Web, and Polly in The Magician's Nephew.

With time, she graduated to community theater, as well as productions at Saint Joseph Notre Dame High School. She graduated in 1997. She studied theatre at UCLA and then at the Royal Academy of Dramatic Art in London. Additionally, she was honored with a Lynn Auerbach Screenwriting Fellowship and The Maryland Film Festival Fellowship.

== Career ==
After returning to the US, she worked as an actor at the Magic Theatre, the American Conservatory Theater, Berkeley Repertory Theatre, and the La Jolla Playhouse. She was in the world premiere of David Edgar's Continental Divide directed by Tony Taccone. She also acted in shows Spin City and Single Dads."

The Diary of a Teenage Girl was Heller's debut film, that she both wrote and directed. It is based on the 2002 graphic novel titled The Diary of a Teenage Girl: An Account in Words and Pictures by Phoebe Gloeckner, which she received as a Christmas present from her sister in 2006. The story's protagonist, Minnie, is a 15-year-old girl living in the San Francisco Bay Area in 1976 who begins an affair with her mother's 35-year-old boyfriend, Monroe. Heller was taken with Minnie's character, a young woman who is confident in her sexuality and, noting the lack of films that represent young women in such a way, she set to adapting the graphic novel to play. With Gloeckner's blessing, she worked the script into a screenplay. The film premiered at the Sundance Film Festival on January 24, 2015, and later received a limited release in August 2015. The film stars Bel Powley as Minnie. Previously, Heller was selected as a 2012 Sundance Screenwriting Fellow and 2012 Sundance Directing Fellow, where she had submitted the script for the Sundance writer and director workshop. She then proceeded to direct a teaser for the film using grant money from the writer's workshop. The film received critical acclaim at Sundance, and was in competition in the U.S. Dramatic category. The film also won the Grand Prix of the Generation 14plus at the Berlin International Film Festival in 2015. In 2016, the film was named best first feature at the Independent Spirit Awards.

Heller's writing credits include screenplays, theatrical plays, and pilots for ABC and 20th Century Fox, such as the ABC pilot The Big Apple and a film for Disney, titled Renegade X.

Heller next directed Can You Ever Forgive Me? about literary forger and writer Lee Israel, based on the author's memoir. She teamed up again with Archer Gray, who she first worked with on Diary. With a limited budget, filming a movie set in the 1990s was a challenge. She cast Melissa McCarthy in the title role based on the actress's performance in the 2014 film St. Vincent. They shot on location in bookstores where Israel had sold her forgeries, including the Argosy Bookstore and Westsider Rare & Used Books. The film premiered at the Toronto International Film Festival on September 8, 2018. It was released on October 19, 2018, by Fox Searchlight.

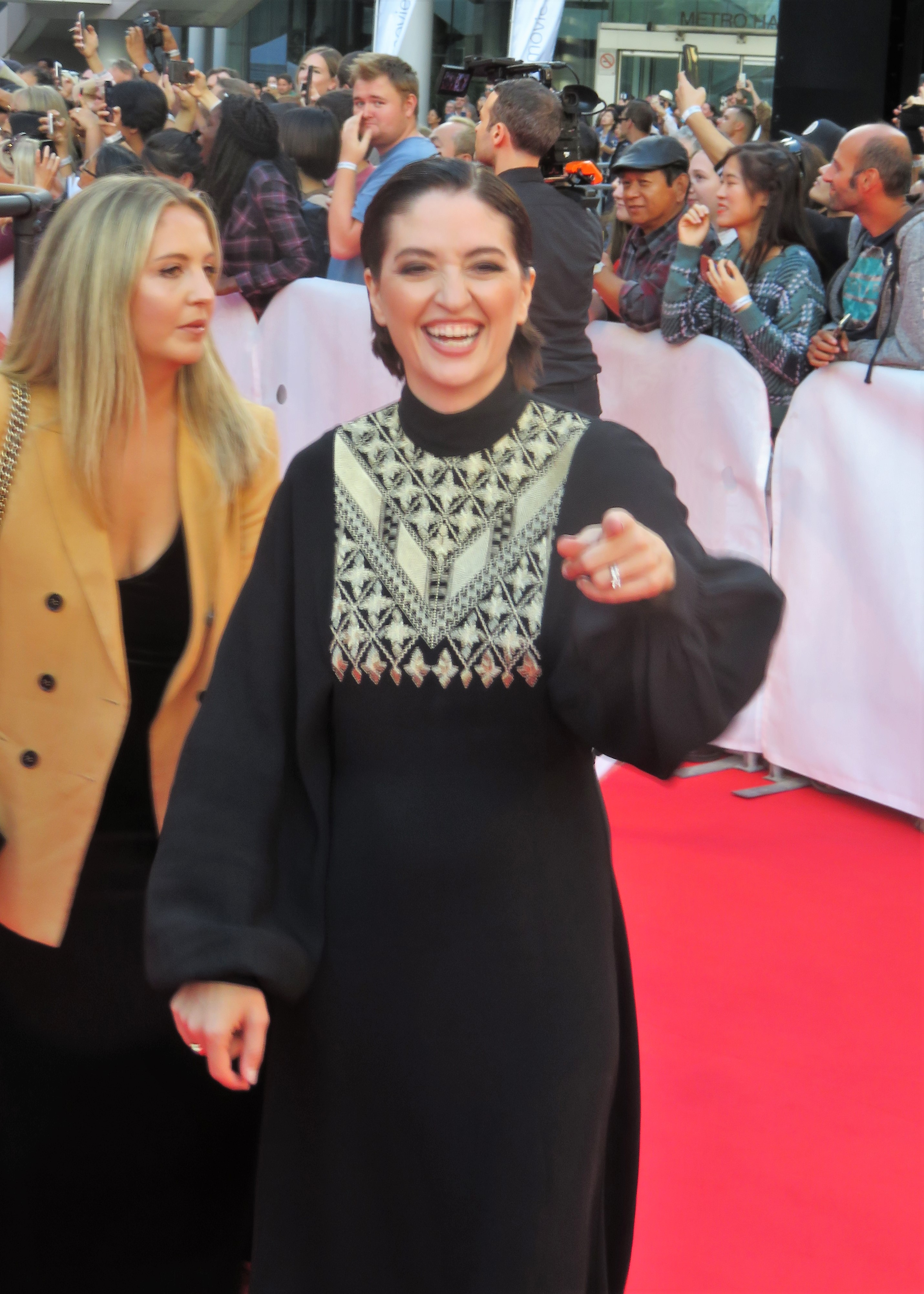
Heller at the 2019 Toronto Film Festival

In January 2018, it was announced that Heller would direct A Beautiful Day in the Neighborhood, a film that chronicles an interview Tom Junod conducted with child entertainer Fred Rogers for Esquire magazine, and how the encounter impacted the journalist's life. The screenplay was written by Emmy-nominated producers Micah Fitzerman-Blue and Noah Harpster. Tom Hanks, who portrays Mr. Rogers, agreed to join the project once Heller signed on as director, as they had met previously through Hanks' son, Colin. It was filmed in Pittsburgh.

Heller played a breakout acting role in the Netflix show The Queen's Gambit as Alma Wheatley. Heller is friends with the director Scott Frank and was going to play the part of Beth's biological mother, until the original actress fell out.

== Media image and directing style ==
Heller has said she is drawn to stories about people "trying to talk about something that people are uncomfortable talking about" and "human beings trying to navigate through the world." Drawn to storytelling, she progressed from an actor to a writer, finally beginning to direct when she dreaded turning her screenplay for Diary over to someone else. She has said that becoming a mother made her change the kind of stories she tells, because she wants "to do good in the world".

In 2020, she was listed, among others, as one of the several female directors snubbed for Academy Awards and Golden Globes nominations for Best Directing, as only men were nominated. Fellow director Greta Gerwig, who also was not nominated, included Heller in her list of women who could have been competing for the Golden Globe. Actress Natalie Portman, as a sign of protest, wore a dress embroidered with the names of these women, including Heller, on the 2020 Oscars red carpet.

Filming days for A Beautiful Day in the Neighborhood adhered to a shooting schedule of ten-hour days that did not break for lunch so that Heller and other cast and crew members could potentially still have nights with their children. She believes sustainable working hours on film sets will allow more female directors to continue working after they have families.

== Personal life ==
Heller is married to comedian Jorma Taccone, having met at UCLA while studying acting. Together they have a son, born in December 2014, and a daughter born in August 2020. They live in Brooklyn, New York.

Heller's brother, Nate, is a musician who composed the scores for all four of her feature films. Her sister, Emily Heller, is a stand-up comic, as well as a producer and writer for the HBO comedy series Barry. Her brother-in-law, Asa Taccone, is the lead singer of the band Electric Guest, and her father-in-law, Tony Taccone, is a theater director. When asked about her greatest source of inspiration, she answered: "Every member of my family, each of whom is completely their own person, and works on being thoughtful and creative every day. And I find inspiration in all of my friends, and my husband, all of whom are working toward living life as an artist every day."

== Filmography ==
=== Film ===
| Year | Title | Director | Writer | Producer |
|---|---|---|---|---|
| 2015 | The Diary of a Teenage Girl | Yes | Yes | No |
| 2018 | Can You Ever Forgive Me? | Yes | No | No |
| 2019 | A Beautiful Day in the Neighborhood | Yes | No | No |
| 2024 | Nightbitch | Yes | Yes | Yes |
| 2027 | The Comebacker † | Yes | Yes | Yes |

Acting roles

| Year | Title | Role | Notes |
|---|---|---|---|
| 2004 | The Liberation of Everyday Life | Flora | Short film |
| 2010 | MacGruber | Clocky | |
| 2014 | A Walk Among the Tombstones | Marie Gotteskind | |
| 2016 | Paper Anchor | Caroline | |
| 2016 | Popstar: Never Stop Never Stopping | Documentary Crew Member | |

=== Television ===
| Year | Title | Notes |
|---|---|---|
| 2015 | Transparent | Episode: "New World Coming" |
| 2016 | Casual | 2 episodes |
| 2020 | What the Constitution Means to Me | Filmed play Also executive producer |

Acting roles

| Year | Title | Role | Notes |
|---|---|---|---|
| 2001 | White Power | Party People | Short |
| 2002 | Spin City | Carrie | Episode "Eyes Wide Open" |
| 2005 | Awesometown | Waitress | Short |
| 2008 | All-for-nots | Heather | 2 episodes |
| 2009 | Single Dads | Jill | Episode "Meeting Girls in the Park" |
| 2020 | The Queen's Gambit | Alma Wheatley | |
| 2021 | MacGruber | MacGruber's mother | |

== Theatre ==
This list is adapted from her biography on The Nervous Breakdown:

- Continental Divide (by David Edgar)
- Hamlet – Ophelia
- King Lear – Cordelia (San Diego Rep)
- Much Ado About Nothing – Hero (Theatricum Botanicum)
- Peninsula (by Madelyn Kent) – starred (SoHo Rep)

== Awards and nominations ==
| Year | Award | Category | Nominated work | Result | Ref. |
|---|---|---|---|---|---|
| 2015 | Austin Film Critics Association | Best First Film | The Diary of a Teenage Girl | Nominated | |
| 2015 | Berlin International Film Festival | Crystal Bear for the Best Film of the Generation 14plus | The Diary of a Teenage Girl | Nominated | |
| 2015 | Berlin International Film Festival | Grand Prix of the Generation 14plus | The Diary of a Teenage Girl | Won | |
| 2015 | Boston Society of Film Critics | Best New Filmmaker | The Diary of a Teenage Girl | Won | |
| 2015 | Chicago Film Critics Association | Most Promising Filmmaker | The Diary of a Teenage Girl | Nominated | |
| 2015 | Edinburgh International Film Festival | Best International Feature Film | The Diary of a Teenage Girl | Won | |
| 2015 | Edinburgh International Film Festival | Audience Award | The Diary of a Teenage Girl | 2nd Runner-up | |
| 2015 | Gijón International Film Festival | Best Film | The Diary of a Teenage Girl | Nominated | |
| 2015 | Gotham Awards | Best Feature | The Diary of a Teenage Girl | Nominated | |
| 2015 | Gotham Awards | Breakthrough Director | The Diary of a Teenage Girl | Nominated | |
| 2015 | Gotham Awards | Best Screenplay | The Diary of a Teenage Girl | Nominated | |
| 2015 | Gotham Awards | Audience Award | The Diary of a Teenage Girl | Nominated | |
| 2015 | IndieWire Critics Poll | Best First Feature | The Diary of a Teenage Girl | Runner-up | |
| 2015 | Palm Springs International Film Festival | Directors to Watch | The Diary of a Teenage Girl | Won | |
| 2015 | San Francisco Bay Area Film Critics Circle | Best Screenplay – Adapted | The Diary of a Teenage Girl | Nominated | |
| 2015 | Sundance Film Festival | U.S. Grand Jury Prize: Dramatic | The Diary of a Teenage Girl | Nominated | |
| 2015 | Women Film Critics Circle | Best Movie by a Woman | The Diary of a Teenage Girl | Nominated | |
| 2015 | Zurich Film Festival | Best International Feature Film | The Diary of a Teenage Girl | Special Mention | |
| 2016 | Alliance of Women Film Journalists | Best Woman Director | The Diary of a Teenage Girl | Won | |
| 2016 | Alliance of Women Film Journalists | Best Woman Screenwriter | The Diary of a Teenage Girl | Nominated | |
| 2016 | Directors Guild of America Awards | Outstanding Directing – First-Time Feature Film | The Diary of a Teenage Girl | Nominated | |
| 2016 | FEST (film festival) | Best Film | The Diary of a Teenage Girl | Won | |
| 2016 | FEST (film festival) | Best Director | The Diary of a Teenage Girl | Won | |
| 2016 | Independent Spirit Awards | Best First Screenplay | The Diary of a Teenage Girl | Nominated | |
| 2016 | Independent Spirit Awards | Best First Feature | The Diary of a Teenage Girl | Won | |
| 2018 | Alliance of Women Film Journalists | Best Woman Director | Can You Ever Forgive Me? | Won | |
| 2018 | Dorian Awards | Director of the Year | Can You Ever Forgive Me? | Nominated | |
| 2019 | Alliance of Women Film Journalists | Best Woman Director | A Beautiful Day in the Neighborhood | Nominated | |
| 2020 | GMA Dove Awards | Inspirational Film of the Year | A Beautiful Day in the Neighborhood | Nominated | |
| 2020 | Independent Spirit Awards | BONNIE Award | Herself | Nominated | |
| 2021 | Critics' Choice Television Awards | Best Limited/Movie Supporting Actress | The Queen's Gambit | Nominated | |
| 2021 | Directors Guild of America Awards | Outstanding Directing – Variety Specials | What the Constitution Means to Me | Nominated | |
| 2021 | Dorian TV Awards | Best Supporting TV Performance | The Queen's Gambit | Nominated | |
| 2021 | Hollywood Critics Association TV Awards | Best Supporting Actress in a Limited Series, Anthology Series, or Television Movie | The Queen's Gambit | Nominated | |
| 2021 | Producers Guild of America Awards | Outstanding Producer of Streamed or Televised Motion Pictures | What the Constitution Means to Me | Nominated | |
| 2024 | Montclair Film Festival | Director Award | Nightbitch | Honored | |
| 2024 | Chicago International Film Festival | Visionary Award | Nightbitch | Honored | |
| 2024 | Sitges Film Festival | Best Motion Picture | Nightbitch | Nominated | |

Directed Academy Award performances

Under Heller's direction, these actors have received the Academy Award nominations for their performances in their respective roles.

| Year | Performer | Film | Result |
Academy Award for Best Actress
| 2019 | Melissa McCarthy | Can You Ever Forgive Me? | Nominated |
Academy Award for Best Supporting Actor
| 2019 | Richard E. Grant | Can You Ever Forgive Me? | Nominated |
| 2020 | Tom Hanks | A Beautiful Day in the Neighborhood | Nominated |
