= Bel Powley =

British actress (born 1992)

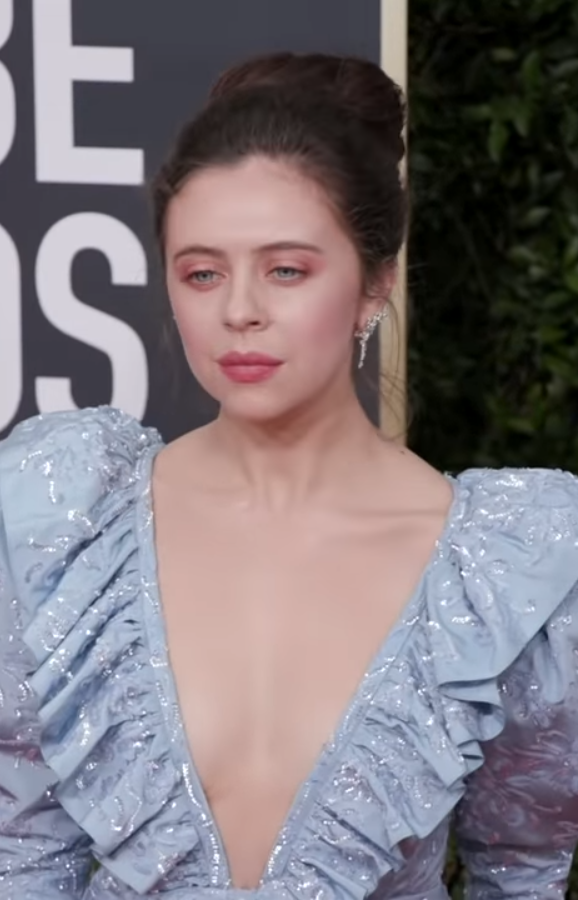
- Powley in 2020
- Born: Isobel Dorothy Powley; 7 March 1992 (age 34); Hammersmith, London, England
- Occupation: Actress
- Years active: 2007–present
- Spouse: Douglas Booth (m. 2023)
- Father: Mark Powley

Isobel Dorothy Powley Booth (born 7 March 1992) is an English actress. Born and raised in London, Powley was educated at Holland Park School. She began acting as a teenager on television, starring on the CBBC action television series M.I. High (2007–2008).

Powley gained critical praise for her portrayal of Princess Margaret in A Royal Night Out (2015), for which she was nominated for the British Independent Film Award for Most Promising Newcomer, and a sexually confused teenager in the coming-of-age film The Diary of a Teenage Girl (2015), for which she was nominated for the Independent Spirit Award for Best Female Lead and won the Trophée Chopard at the 2016 Cannes Film Festival.

On television, Powley starred in the National Geographic miniseries A Small Light (2023). For her performance as Miep Gies, Powley received critical acclaim and was nominated for a Critics' Choice Television Award and Screen Actors Guild Award.

== Early life ==
Powley was born in the Hammersmith borough of London, England, to British actor Mark Powley and casting director Janis Jaffa. Her mother is the descendant of Jewish immigrants from the Russian Empire to Little Jerusalem in Dublin, Ireland. Powley attended Holland Park School.

== Career ==
=== Screen ===
From 2007 until 2008, Powley was one of the lead characters in M.I. High, starring in 23 episodes. Powley has also appeared in several other productions such as Murderland (three episodes, 2009), Little Dorrit (2008), The Bill (2008) and The Whistleblowers (2007). In 2013, Powley was joining the cast of the ITV series Benidorm for series six.

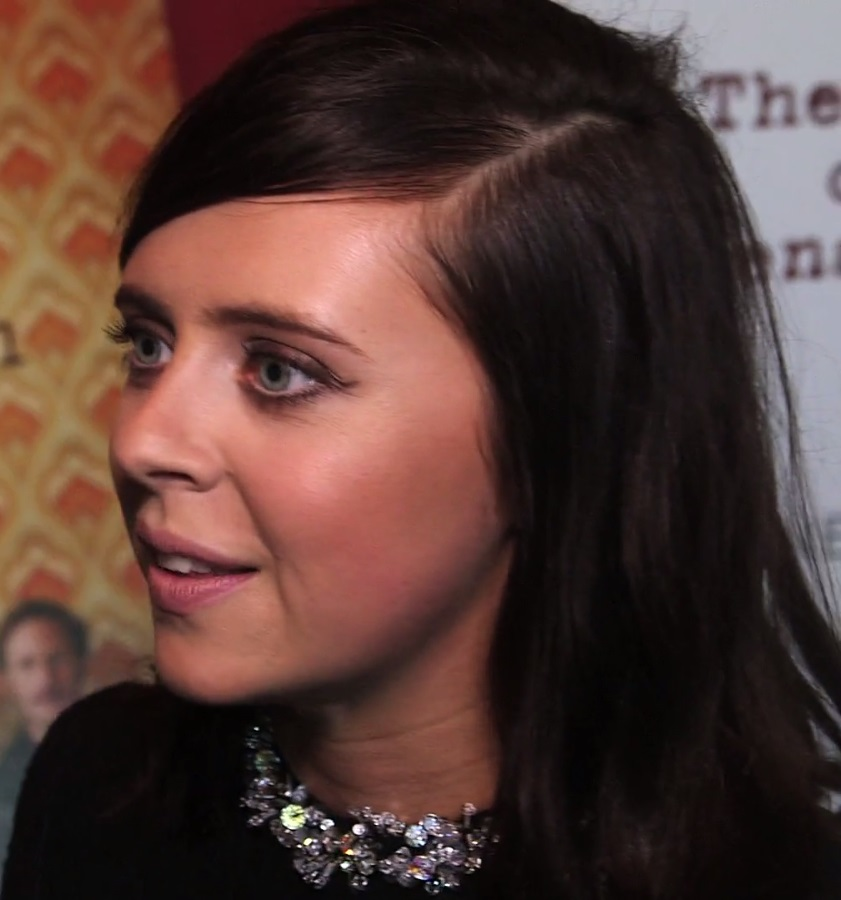
Powley in 2015

In 2015, Powley portrayed Princess Margaret in the biographical comedy-drama A Royal Night Out, alongside Sarah Gadon as Princess Elizabeth. Powley played the lead role of Minnie Goetze in the comedy-drama film The Diary of a Teenage Girl, which premiered in New York City and Los Angeles in August 2015. Shortly afterward, Powley starred as the titular character in the 2016 indie film Carrie Pilby, taking over the role from Hailee Steinfeld.

Her films since include Carrie Pilby (2016), Mary Shelley (2017) and Ashes in the Snow (2018). In 2018, Powley starred opposite Liv Tyler in the horror film Wildling, and appeared in the crime-drama film White Boy Rick. That same year, Powley played a lead role as Holly Morten in the BBC One drama Informer. In June 2020, Powley appeared in The King of Staten Island as the love interest of Pete Davidson's character. On television, Powley has appeared in the Apple TV+ series The Morning Show (2019–2021) and in 2022, Powley played Birdy, one of the main characters in the TV series Everything I Know About Love of the BBC.

Powley was most recently seen in Masters of the Air (2024). On June 9, 2025, it was announced that Powley would be playing Petunia Dursley in the upcoming Harry Potter TV series.

=== Stage ===
Powley appeared as Maggie in Tusk Tusk at the Royal Court Theatre, London, in March 2009. On Broadway, she was Thomasina in the 2011 revival of Arcadia at the Ethel Barrymore Theatre. In October 2011, she once again appeared at the Royal Court as Tilly in Jumpy, a role to which she returned in the West End transfer of Jumpy to the Duke of York's Theatre in August 2012. She appeared as Dawn in the March 2018 revival of Lobby Hero at the Hayes Theatre, alongside Chris Evans, Michael Cera and Brian Tyree Henry.

== Personal life ==
In an interview in 2013, Powley said she had been accepted to study history at the University of Manchester, but she never attended. She also deferred a place at University College London several times to pursue her acting career.

It was announced in July 2021 via actor Douglas Booth's Instagram page that he and Powley were engaged to be married, having met on the set of the film Mary Shelley in 2016. The wedding took place on 28 October 2023 at Petersham Nurseries in Richmond, followed by an afterparty at the Institute of Contemporary Arts. The couple were married under a chuppah made by Booth's sister, an artist, to honour Powley's Jewish heritage.

== Filmography ==
Key
†	Denotes projects that have not yet been released

=== Film ===
Year	Title	Role	Notes	Ref.
2011	The Cabin	Sydney	Television film	
2013	Side by Side	Lauren Buckle		
2015	The Diary of a Teenage Girl	Minnie Goetze		
2015	A Royal Night Out	Princess Margaret		
2015	Equals	Rachel		
2016	Detour	Cherry		
2016	Carrie Pilby	Carrie Pilby		
2017	Mary Shelley	Claire Clairmont		
2018	Wildling	Anna		
2018	White Boy Rick	Dawn Wershe		
2018	Ashes in the Snow	Lina Vilkas		
2020	The King of Staten Island	Kelsey		
2023	Cold Copy	Mia Scott		
2024	Turn Me On	Joy		
2026	Savage House	Dorothy Neville		

=== Television ===
Year	Title	Role	Notes	Ref.
2007	The Whistleblowers	Emma Clayson	Episode: "Starters"	
2007–2008	M.I. High	Daisy Millar	Series regular; 23 episodes	
2008	The Bill	Becky Cooper	Episode: "Loved and Lost"	
2008	Little Dorrit	Flower Girl	Episode: "Episode 3"	
2009	Murderland	Carrie Walsh	Miniseries; 3 episodes	
2014	Benidorm	Bianca Dyke	Series regular; 6 episodes	
2016	Revolting Rhymes	Cindy	Episode: "Part Two"	
2018	Informer	Holly Morten	Series regular; 6 episodes	
2019–2024	Moominvalley	Little My	Series regular; 51 episodes	
2019–2025	The Morning Show	Claire Conway	Series regular; 13 episodes	
2022	Everything I Know About Love	Birdy	Series regular; 7 episodes	
2023	A Small Light	Miep Gies	Miniseries; 8 episodes	
2024	Masters of the Air	Alessandra "Sandra" Wesgate	Miniseries; 3 episodes	
2026	Possession	Charlotte	4 episodes	
2026	Harry Potter †	Petunia Dursley	Post-production	
2027	Shy & Lola †	Lola	Lead role	

=== Audio ===
Year	Title	Role	Notes
2026	My Husbands Wife	Olivia Bird	Audiobook
2021	Soft Voice	Soft Voice	Podcast
2023	Told You So	Lucie	Audible Original
2026	Sober Companion	Lucy Green	BBC Radio 4

== Theatre ==
Year	Title	Role	Company	Director
2009	Tusk Tusk	Maggie	The Royal Court Theatre	Jeremy Herrin
2011	Arcadia	Thomasina	Ethel Barrymore Theatre (Broadway)	David Leveaux
2011	Jumpy	Tilly	Royal Court Theatre & Ambassador Theatre Group	Nina Raine
2013	Raving	Tabby	Hampstead Theatre	Edward Hall
2014	Elephants	Daisy	Hampstead Theatre	Tamara Harvey
2018	Lobby Hero	Dawn	Helen Hayes Theatre (Broadway)	Trip Cullman
2024	The Real Thing	Annie	The Old Vic	Max Webster
2025	Christmas Day	Tamara	Almeida Theatre	James Macdonald

== Awards and nominations ==
Year	Work	Association	Award	Result
2015	A Royal Night Out	Hamptons International Film Festival	Breakthrough Performer	Won
2015	A Royal Night Out	British Independent Film Awards	Most Promising Newcomer	Nominated
2015	The Diary of a Teenage Girl	Gotham Independent Film Awards	Best Actress	Won
2015	The Diary of a Teenage Girl	Niagara Integrated Film Festival	NIFF Rising Star	Won
2015	The Diary of a Teenage Girl	Detroit Film Critics Society	Best Actress	Nominated
2015	The Diary of a Teenage Girl	Detroit Film Critics Society	Breakthrough Artist	Nominated
2015	The Diary of a Teenage Girl	Chicago Film Critics Association	Most Promising Performer	Nominated
2015	The Diary of a Teenage Girl	Florida Film Critics Circle	Pauline Kael Breakout Award	Nominated
2015	The Diary of a Teenage Girl	Women's Image Network Awards	Outstanding Actress in a Feature Film	Nominated
2015	The Diary of a Teenage Girl	Women Film Critics Circle	Best Young Actress	Nominated
2015	The Diary of a Teenage Girl	Village Voice Film Poll	Best Actress	Nominated
2015	The Diary of a Teenage Girl	New York Film Critics Circle	Breakthrough Performance	Nominated
2015	The Diary of a Teenage Girl	Indiewire Critics' Poll	Best Lead Actress	Nominated
2015	The Diary of a Teenage Girl	Kansas City Film Critics Circle	Best Actress	Nominated
2016	The Diary of a Teenage Girl	Cannes Film Festival	Trophée Chopard - Female Revelation	Won
2016	The Diary of a Teenage Girl	British Academy of Film and Television Arts	BAFTA Rising Star Award	Nominated
2016	The Diary of a Teenage Girl	Film Independent Spirit Awards	Best Female Lead	Nominated
2016	The Diary of a Teenage Girl	Empire	Best Female Newcomer	Nominated
2016	The Diary of a Teenage Girl	Alliance of Women Film Journalists	Best Breakthrough Performance	Nominated
2016	The Diary of a Teenage Girl	Chlotrudis Awards	Best Actress	Nominated
2016	The Diary of a Teenage Girl	FEST International Film Festival	Best Actress	Won
2024	A Small Light	Critics' Choice Television Awards	Best Actress in a Movie/Miniseries	Nominated
2024	A Small Light	Screen Actors Guild Awards	Outstanding Female Actor in a Miniseries or Television Movie	Nominated
