= Rhodri Meilir =

Welsh actor (born 1978)

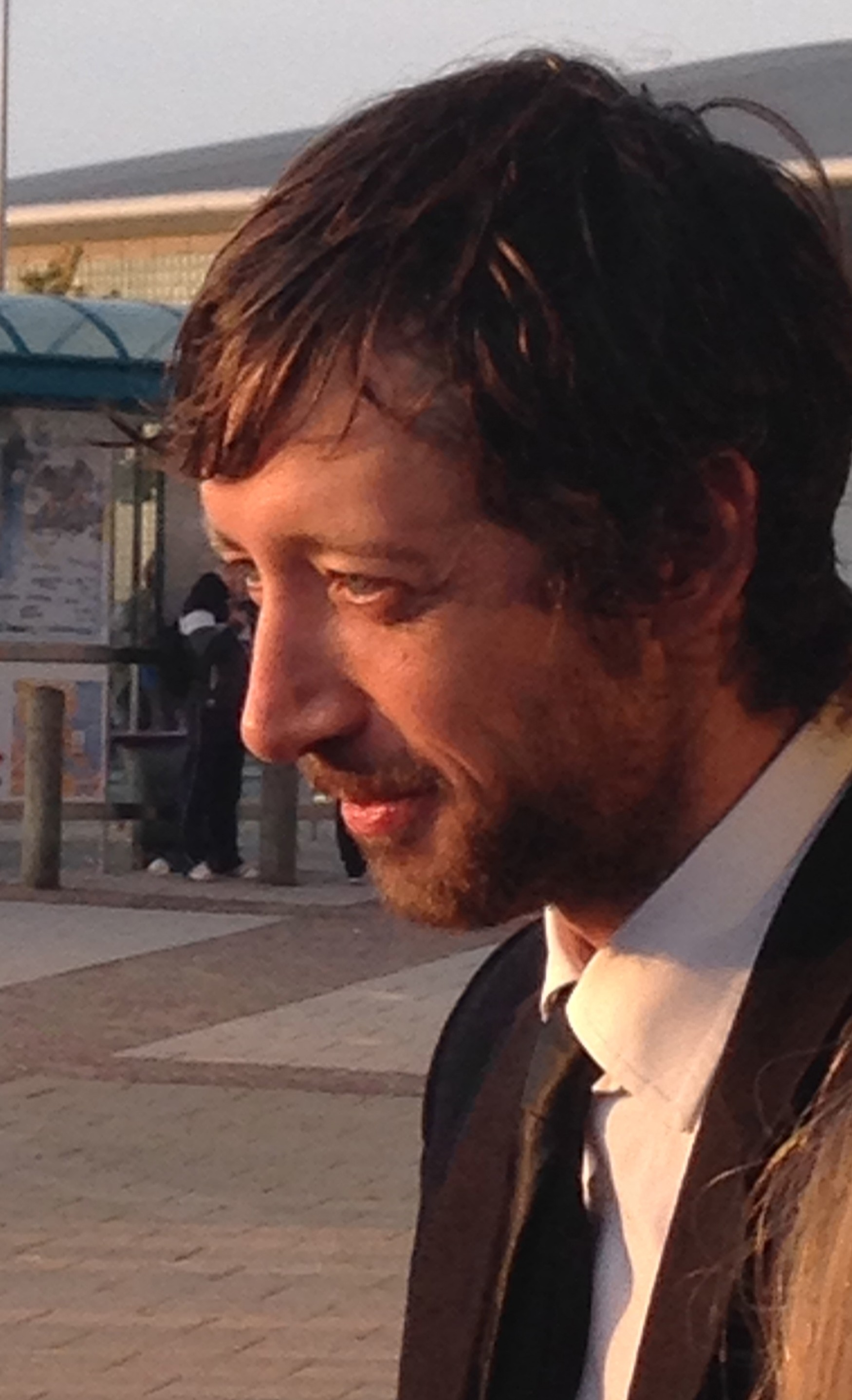
- Meilir in 2013
- Born: 18 November 1978 (age 47); Pontypool, Wales,
- Education: Aberystwyth University
- Years active: 2000–present

Rhodri Meilir (born 18 November 1978) is a Welsh actor. In 2018, he began playing Dilwyn in the BBC Three series In My Skin.

== Early life ==
Meilir was born in Pontypool. He was educated at Ysgol Maes Garmon in Mold,and Ysgol Morgan Llwyd, Wrecsam, where he studied drama. and Aberystwyth University's Department of Theatre, Film and Television Studies.

== Career ==
Best known for playing Alfie Butts in the BBC sitcom My Family, Meilir has also appeared in a number of popular television shows such as Afterlife and Terry Pratchett's Hogfather on Sky One. He has also featured in a number of films, including the 2007 film The Baker and the 2014 film Pride, directed by Matthew Warchus. In 2006, he appeared in the Doctor Who episode "The Runaway Bride".

He is well known on Welsh television for his roles in an extensive range of shows, including Y Pris, Caerdydd, Teulu, Tipyn o Stad, Cyw and Y Gwyll. He played the lead role of Trefor the taxi driver in Gwlad yr Astra Gwyn, for which he received a BAFTA Cymru nomination as best actor in 2013, and was the original Rapsgaliwn. In 2016-2017 he appeared in a regular role in the drama Byw Celwydd.

Meilir has toured with numerous theatre companies including Theatr Genedlaethol Cymru, Theatr Fran Wen and Bara Caws.

In 2018, Meilir starred in Craith, a crime thriller about abduction and murder, broadcast on S4C in the Welsh language. The series is set in Wales and ran in January-February 2018, later being shown on BBC One Wales as Hidden. He said of his role: "He’s a complicated character; the result of mistreatment and violence at the hands of his own mother."

In 2023, he starred in the black comedy Pren ar y Bryn on S4C, later shown in English on BBC One as Tree on a Hill.

In 2026, he was cast as the voice of Gold Leader in the Welsh dub of Star Wars: Episode IV - A New Hope.

== Selected theatre ==
- Jimmy in How My Light is Spent by Alan Harris. Directed by Liz Stevenson at the Royal Exchange, Manchester, (May 2017)
