= Alexandria Riley =

Welsh actress

- Education: Royal Welsh College of Music & Drama (MA)
- Occupation: Actress
- Television: Silo; The Pembrokeshire Murders

Alexandria Riley is a Welsh actress and documentarian. Her acting roles include Silo (2023–present). She was nominated for a leading actress BAFTA at the 2021 BAFTA Cymru Awards for her role in The Pembrokeshire Murders (2021).

== Early life and education ==
Alexandria Riley was born and raised in Newport, Wales, United Kingdom.

Riley completed a BA in Applied Drama at the University of Wales, Newport. She graduated from the Royal Welsh College of Music & Drama in 2022.

== Career ==
=== Documentaries ===
Riley anchored the Welsh documentary film Mixed, part of the New Voices from Wales series, broadcast on BBC Two Wales in March 2019, which looked at her own experiences, and those of others, being mixed-race in Wales. She also featured in the Liana Stewart 2020 documentary Black and Welsh.

=== Acting ===
She had early acting roles in The End of the F***ing World and the BBC Three comedy In My Skin.

She played DI Ella Richards in ITV crime series The Pembrokeshire Murders in 2024. She was nominated for a leading actress BAFTA Award at the 2021 BAFTA Cymru Awards for her role.

She also appeared as Natalie in BBC Wales comedy The Tuckers, in which she starred opposite creator Steve Speirs, and S4C's Bang. She appeared in stage productions for National Theatre Wales.

In 2023, she appeared in Wales-set British television film Men Up. From 2023, she played Camille Sims, wife of Robert (Common), in the Apple TV+ series Silo.

She had roles in Baby Reindeer and Lost Boys and Fairies, as well as the BBC One crime mystery series Death Valley, alongside Timothy Spall, among others.

== Personal life ==
She has a Welsh mother and a father from the Caribbean. She has four children.

== Filmography ==
Year	Title	Role	Notes
2017	Bang	Tracy	2 episodes
2018–2021	In My Skin	Mrs. Morgan	Series 1–2; 10 episodes
2019	Almost Never	Teacher	Episode: "The Spotlight"
2019	Warren	Waitress	Episode: "The Pond"
2019	The End of the F***ing World	Leigh	Series 2; 4 episodes
2019	New Voices from Wales	Herself - Presenter	Episode: "Mixed"; also writer
2020–2022	The Tuckers	Natalie Tucker	Series 1–3; 18 episodes
2021	The Pembrokeshire Murders	DI Ella Richards	Mini-series; 3 episodes
2021	The Pact	DC Anford	5 episodes
2021	The Outlaws	Yvonne	2 episodes
2022	Life and Death in the Warehouse	Julie	Television film
2022	Galwad	Efa (2052)	Television film
2022	Documentary Now!	Field Reporter	Episode: "How They Threw Rocks"
2023	The End We Start From	P	Film
2023	Men Up	Alys Shah	Television film
2023–present	Silo	Camille Sims	Series 1–present; 18 episodes
2024	Baby Reindeer	Detective Culver	Mini-series; 3 episodes
2024	Lost Boys and Fairies	Sharon	Mini-series; 2 episodes
2024	Ar y Ffin	(unknown)	Also English version: Mudtown; 5 episodes
2025	The Death of Bunny Munro	Jennifer	2 episodes
2025–2026	Death Valley	Helen Baxter	Series 1–2; 12 episodes
