= Men Up =

British television film

- Promotional poster
- Genre: Factual drama
- Screenplay by: Matthew Barry
- Directed by: Ashley Way
- Starring: Aneurin Barnard; Alexandra Roach; Phaldut Sharma; Iwan Rheon; Mark Lewis Jones; Steffan Rhodri; Joanna Page
- Composer: Blair Mowat
- Country of origin: Wales
- Original language: English

Production
- Executive producers: Nicola Shindler; Davina Earl; Rachel Evans; Matthew Barry; Russell T Davies; Rebecca Ferguson
- Producer: Karen Lewis
- Cinematography: Adam Etherington
- Editor: John Richards
- Production companies: Boom; Quay Street Productions

Original release
- Network: BBC One
- Release: 29 December 2023

Men Up is a Welsh television film broadcast on BBC One and BBC iPlayer, about the first clinical trials for the drug viagra, which took place in Swansea in 1994. Russell T Davies is amongst the executive producers. The cast includes Aneurin Barnard, Alexandra Roach, Phaldut Sharma, Iwan Rheon, Steffan Rhodri and Joanna Page. It aired on 29 December 2023.

== Synopsis ==
In Morriston Hospital in Swansea in 1994, a group of middle-aged Welsh men stepped into the unknown by taking part in the world's first medical trials for the drug that became Viagra.

== Cast ==
- Iwan Rheon as Meurig Jenkins
- Aneurin Barnard as Dr. Dylan Pearce
- Alexandra Roach as Ffion Jenkins
- Phaldut Sharma as Peetham ‘Pete’ Shah
- Paul Rhys as Tommy Cadogan
- Steffan Rhodri as Colin White
- Mark Lewis Jones as Eddie O’Connor
- Joanna Page as Moira Davies
- Lisa Palfrey as Teresa Rigby
- Alexandria Riley as Alys Shah
- Dyfan Dwyfor as Leigh Bennett
- Katy Wix as Joanna Wootle

== Production ==
The programme was written by Matthew Barry. Executive producers were Nicola Shindler and Davina Earl for Quay Street Productions, Rachel Evans for Boom, Matthew Barry, Russell T Davies and Rebecca Ferguson for the BBC. Men Up was directed by Ashley Way and produced by Karen Lewis.

=== Casting ===
In 2023 the cast was revealed to include Phaldut Sharma, Iwan Rheon, Mark Lewis Jones, Steffan Rhodri, Alexandra Roach and Joanna Page. Dyfan Dwyfor and Aneurin Barnard also appeared.

=== Filming ===
Filming took place in Swansea in early 2023. Filming had wrapped before the end of May 2023.

== Broadcast and reception ==
The programme was shown in the UK on BBC One and BBC iPlayer during the 2023 festive period.

Writing for The Guardian, Lucy Mangan described the programme as "a masterpiece" and awarded it five stars out of five.

=== Accolades ===
The programme was nominated for Best Single Drama at the Royal Television Society Programme Awards in March 2024.

The film won the award for Best Feature Length Film at the Banff World Media Festival Rockie Awards in June 2024.

Matthew Barry was awarded Best Writer at the BAFTA Cymru Awards in October 2024.

It was nominated for the 2025 Broadcast Awards in the Best Single Drama category.
