= Lisa Palfrey =

Welsh actress

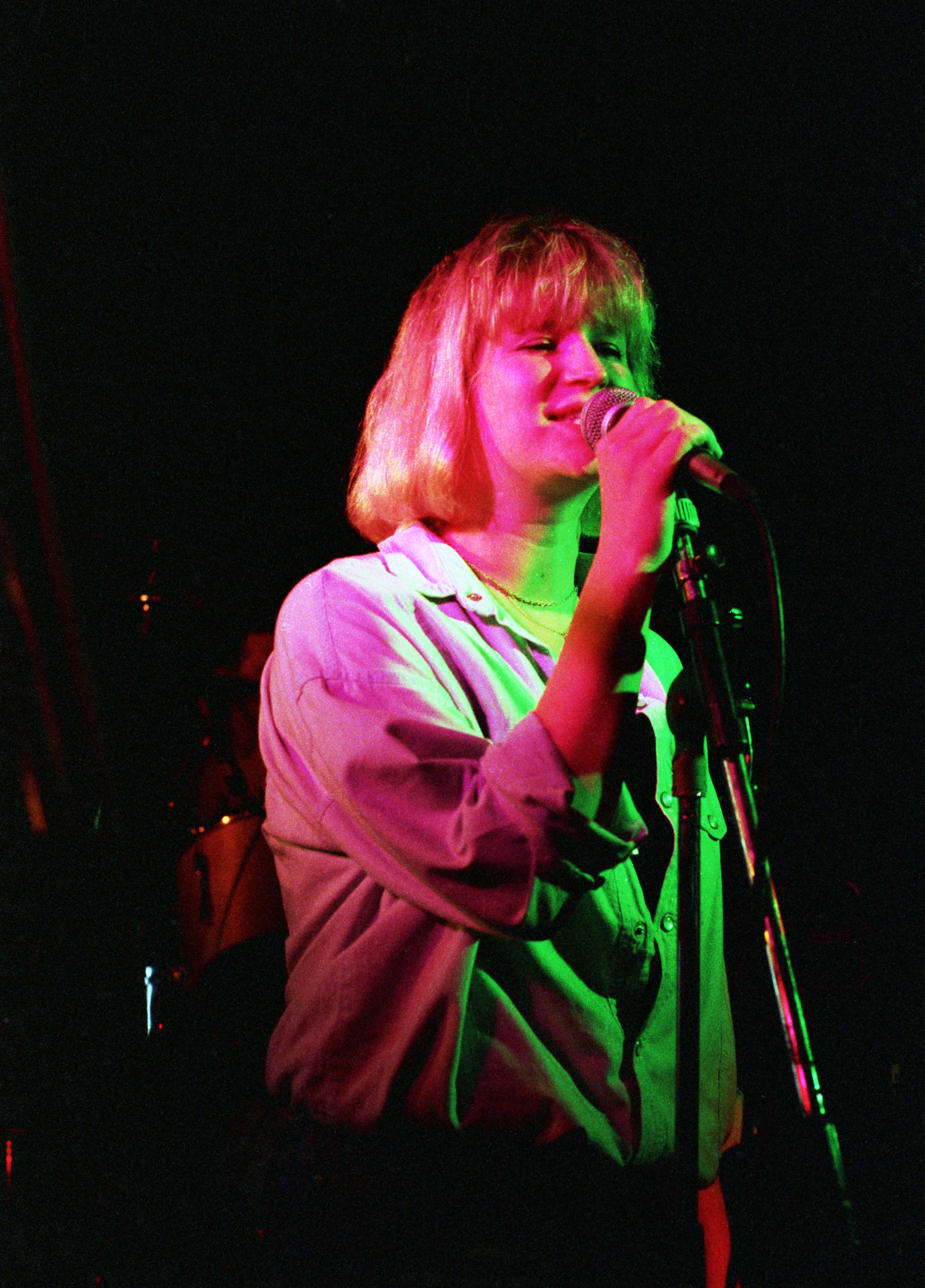
- Palfrey in 1987
- Born: 9 February 1967 (age 59); Wales, United Kingdom
- Occupation: Actress
- Years active: 1987–present
- Children: 1

Lisa Palfrey (born 9 February 1967) is a Welsh actress. She is known for playing the roles of Gwenny in House of America (1997), Mrs. Nice in Guest House Paradiso (1999), Maureen in Pride (2014), Mrs. Dai Bread 1 in Under Milk Wood (2015), Cynthia in the Netflix original television series Sex Education and Eleanor James in the Sky One original television series COBRA.

== Early life ==
Palfrey was born in Wales on 9 February 1967, her mother is Eiry Palfrey, an actress and author. She attended Ysgol Gyfun Rhydfelen, a Welsh-medium secondary school near Pontypridd.

== Career ==
Palfrey started acting at the age of 20 when she played the role of 15-year-old girl, Jane Sanderson, in the BBC One television series The District Nurse. Her first major role was in the film The Englishman Who Went Up a Hill But Came Down a Mountain. She has gone on to star in the cult film House of America, and appeared as Melanie Collier in the medical drama television series Casualty as well as Inspector Tracey McAndrew in the third series of the police procedural television series Line of Duty. She played the role of Rhiannedd Frost in the Welsh soap opera Pobol y Cwm.

Palfrey has performed in a number of plays, including the original production of David Eldridge's Festen, The Iceman Cometh, Under the Blue Sky, and Tom Wells's The Kitchen Sink.

In 2019, Palfrey played the role of Cynthia in the Netflix original series Sex Education.

In 2020, Palfrey played the role of government minister Eleanor James in the Sky One original television drama series COBRA, written by Ben Richards and starring Robert Carlyle as British Prime Minister Robert Sutherland. She played the part of Pam Green in the BBC Drama Chloe in 2022. In 2023 she filmed the BBC television feature Men Up, about the first clinical trials for the drug Viagra that took place in Swansea in 1994.

== Filmography ==
=== Film ===
Year	Title	Role	Notes
1995	The Englishman Who Went Up a Hill But Came Down a Mountain	Blod Jones	
1997	House of America	Gwenny	
1997	The Deadness of Dad	Mam	Short film
1999	Guest House Paradiso	Mrs. Nice	
1999	Oh Little Town of Bethlehem	Michelle	Short film
2000	Maybe Baby	Jan	
2003	Y Mabinogi	Arianrhod	Voice role
2008	Poncho Mamgu	Nel	Documentary
2011	360	Psychologist	
2014	Pride	Maureen	
2015	Under Milk Wood	Mrs. Dai Bread 1	
2015	Visiting Mr Keats	Professor Bell	Short film
2018	National Theatre Live: Cat on a Hot Tin Roof	Big Mama	
2019	Make Up	Shirley	
2021	The Feast	Mair Bowen	
2022	Prey for the Devil	Sister Euphemia	

=== Television ===
Year	Title	Role	Notes
1987	The District Nurse	Jane Sanderson	Episode: "A Flick of the Coin"
1993	Thicker Than Water	Young Mother	TV film
1996	Lord of Misrule	Amy Clarke	TV film
1997	Soldier Soldier	Private Diane Saltmarsh	Episode: "Fit to Explode"
1997	The Investigator	Sergeant Kathy Bartlett	TV film
1999	Split Second	Christine Montgomery	TV film
2001	Mind Games	DC Rebecca Longton	TV film
2001	The Bench	Jules Bowen	Episodes: S01 E01, S01 E03
2002	Outside the Rules	Lola Davies	TV series
2002	Green-Eyed Monster	DC Karen Carter	TV film
2002	Casualty	Melanie Collier	8 episodes
2003	High Hopes	Dominique	Episode: "Pretty Woman"
2004	The Bill	Fee Paterson	Episode: "187: Shaken"
2004	The Inspector Lynley Mysteries	Lizzie Shakespeare	Episode: "If Wishes Were Horses"
2006–2007	Pobol y Cwm	Rhiannedd Frost	Welsh TV series
2010	Pen Talar	Doctor	Episode: "Part 8"
2013	Family Tree	Luba Chadwick	Recurring role, 4 episodes
2015	The Bastard Executioner	Nia's mother	Episode: "Effigy/Ddelw"
2016	Line of Duty	Inspector Tracey McAndrew	3 episodes
2016	Aberfan: The Green Hollow	Edna	TV movie, documentary
2016	Hinterland	Sioned Jones	Episode: "Aftermath"
2019–2020	Sex Education	Cynthia	Main role
2019	Wild Bill	Audrey Merrick	Episode: "Bad Blood in the Soil"
2020	COBRA	Eleanor James	Main role
2021	Intergalactic	Zeeda	Episode: S01 E02, S01 E02
2022	Pact	Beth	Main role
2022	The Light in the Hall	Nina	
2023	Men Up	Teresa Rigby	Television film

=== Video game ===
- Doctor Who: Attack of the Graske (2005), as Mum
