= Rapscallion =

Rapscallion may refer to:

- Rapscallion, space freighter in The Space Gypsy Adventures
- The Rapscallions, antagonist army in the book The Long Patrol
- The Rapscallions, a collegiate a cappella group from the 1980s
- Rapp Scallion, a character in the game Monkey Island
- "The Last Superpower AKA Rapscallion", a song by Primus, from their 2003 EP Animals Should Not Try to Act Like People
- RapScallions, an American rock band
- Rapsgaliwn, a Welsh language children's TV show.
