= Gabrielle Creevy =

Welsh actress

- Born: 1996 (age 29–30); Port Talbot, Wales
- Occupation: Actress

Gabrielle Elizabeth Creevy (born 1996) is a Welsh actress. She is known for her role as Bethan Gwyndaf in the BBC series In My Skin (2018–2021), for which she won a BAFTA Cymru in 2020. She was awarded a second BAFTA Cymru in 2026 for her role in The Guest.

== Early life ==
Creevy is from Port Talbot in West Glamorgan, Wales. She lived in a council flat as a child. Her mother is a local mobile hairdresser. Creevy took classes at the Mark Jermin Stage School. She went on to graduate with a Bachelor of Arts in acting from the Arts Educational School (ArtsEd) in London. She then applied for ArtsEd and got a scholarship. Before pursuing acting professionally, she worked in a coffee shop in her local gym.

== Career ==
Creevy made her acting debut in three episodes of the S4C drama series Gwaith/Cartref in 2011. The next year, she appeared in an episode of the BBC medical drama Casualty. During her time at ArtsEd, Creevy appeared in the ITV comedy series The Stand Up Sketch Show. In 2018, Creevy filmed the pilot of In My Skin across five days for BBC Three. After it was commissioned into a full series, she was nominated for the BAFTA Cymru award for Actress in 2019. She subsequently won the award. Creevy was on a coffee shop shift when she learned that she had been nominated and had to return to her shift after finding out.

In May 2019, Creevy performed on stage in a production titled Lose Yourself at the Sherman Theatre in Cardiff. Her performance was praised by critics. Later in 2019, Creevy starred in the Channel 5 drama series 15 Days as Katie, and featured in another episode of Casualty. In 2020, she appeared in an episode of the BBC detective series Father Brown, which she enjoyed since it was her first period role. She appeared in the British film Operation Mincemeat, and also appeared in The Pact.

In 2021, it was announced that Creevy had been cast in the Showtime series Three Women. In My Skin returned for a second series in November 2021, with Creevy reprising her role as Bethan Gwyndaf. In September 2025, she played a lead role as Ria Powell in the BBC four-part miniseries The Guest. In 2026 she was awarded her second BAFTA Cymru for this role. After finishing filming a role as Welsh assassin Eleanor Davies for the Netflix series Black Doves in 2024 (1st series) and 2026 (2nd series), she joined the cast of the upcoming Sky series Amadeus, playing Constanze, the wife of Mozart. She will also star in the upcoming BBC One supernatural series, The Witch Farm, created by Danny Robins and debuting on 22 November 2026.

== Filmography ==
Key
†	Denotes works that have not yet been released

=== Film ===
Year	Film	Role	Notes	Ref.
2021	Operation Mincemeat	Doris Michael		

=== Television ===
Year	Title	Role	Notes	Ref.
2011	Gwaith/Cartref	Megan Adams	Recurring role; 3 episodes	
2012	Casualty	Bethany Jones	Episode: "Grand Canyon"	
2018–2021	In My Skin	Bethan Gwyndaf	Series regular; 10 episodes	
2019	15 Days	Katie / Catrin	Miniseries; 2 episodes	
2019	Casualty	Shona Collins	Episode: "Series 33, Episode 32"	
2021	The Pact	Tamsin	Series regular; 6 episodes	
2024	Three Women	Maggie Wilkin	Series regular; 10 episodes	
2024-2026	Black Doves	Eleanor Davies	Series regular; 12 episodes	
2025	The Guest	Ria Powell	Series regular; 4 episodes	
2025	Amadeus	Constanze Mozart	Post-production	
2026	The Witch Farm	Liz Rich	Upcoming four-part drama	

== Awards and nominations ==
Year	Award	Category	Nominated work	Result	Ref.
2019	BAFTA Cymru	Actress	In My Skin	Won	
2020	BAFTA Cymru	Actress	In My Skin	Nominated	
