= Mark Lewis Jones =

Welsh actor (born 1964)

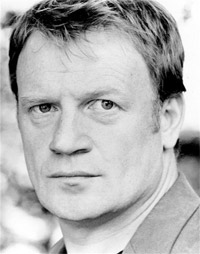
- Born: 1964 or 1965 (age 61–62); Rhosllanerchrugog, Wrexham County Borough, Wales
- Education: Royal Welsh College of Music & Drama
- Occupation: Actor
- Years active: 1985–present
- Awards: BAFTA Cymru award for Best Actor in The Passing / Yr Ymadawiad

Mark Lewis Jones (born 1964 or 1965) is a Welsh actor. He has played roles in a number of Welsh TV series, as well as other roles in a range of TV series and films. He is known for playing Rob Morgan in the comedy-drama series Stella (2012-2017), Steve Baldini in Keeping Faith (2017-2020) and King Charles III's Welsh teacher Edward Millward in the Netflix series The Crown. He also played First Order Captain Moden Canady in Star Wars: The Last Jedi (2017). He has also had many stage roles, and is a voice actor on radio and video games.

== Early life and education ==
Mark Lewis Jones was born in 1964 or 1965 in Rhosllannerchrugog, near Wrexham in Wales.

He began acting as a teenager with the Clwyd Youth Theatre and trained at the Royal Welsh College of Music & Drama.

== Career ==
Jones has acted with the Royal Shakespeare Company, and at Shakespeare's Globe Theatre in London.

In the 1990s, he was given roles in TV series The Bill, Casualty, Soldier Soldier, and A Mind to Kill. Other television roles include appearances in This Life, Holby City, Spooks, Murphy's Law, Waking the Dead, Torchwood. He played Detective Inspector Russell Bing in the police drama 55 Degrees North (2004). Jones played Detective Sergeant Ray Lloyd in police drama Murder Prevention in 2004.

In 2001, Jones portrayed Uther Pendragon, father of King Arthur and second husband of Igraine, in the American TV miniseries The Mists of Avalon. In 2003 and 2004 he had roles in Master and Commander: The Far Side of the World and Troy respectively. From 2005 until 2008 he played Irfon in S4C's Con Passionate.

In 2006 he played Josi Evans in Stan Barstow and Diana Griffiths' film adaptation of the novel by Sian James, Calon Gaeth (Small country), shot in Welsh and English, and filmed on location in Pembrokeshire, Carmarthenshire, Brecon, Glamorgan, and Oxford. and, in 2007, Bryan Jones in Y Pris.

In 2015, he had a lead role in The Passing (Yr Ymadawiad).

Jones auditioned for Star Wars: The Force Awakens (2015) but did not get the part. However, he was later offered the part of Captain Canady for the sequel, Star Wars: The Last Jedi (2017). He appears prominently in the opening sequences and says he played the part with "a posh Welsh accent".

He played Rob Morgan in the comedy-drama Stella (2012–2017), and Steve Baldini in the 2018 drama series Keeping Faith (2017–2020).

Jones played prominent 1960s Welsh nationalist activist Dr Edward Millward in The Crown; Iwan Bevan in Jack Thorne's 2019 drama miniseries The Accident; and Tom Christie in the 6th series of Outlander. He had roles in Chernobyl (2019), Game of Thrones, and BBC's Welsh drama made-for-TV film Men Up.

He plays Caleb in the 2025 ITVX thriller Out There.

Jones will voice the character Darth Vader in Star Wars: Episode IV - A New Hope, which is to be dubbed into Welsh for the first time as the film prepares to celebrate its 50th anniversary in 2027.

== Other media appearances ==
In 2009, Jones was a guest in the BBC Cardiff Singer of the World competition, broadcast on 11 June on BBC Two Wales.

== Awards and nominations ==
In 2016, Jones won a BAFTA Cymru award for Best Actor in the 2015 film The Passing / Yr Ymadawiad.

BAFTA Cymru Best Actor award nominations include: 2013 Awards for Stella; 2017 Awards for The Lighthouse; 2018 Awards for Keeping Faith; and in 2021 for Gangs of London.

Jones was awarded a Fellowship from the Royal Welsh College of Music & Drama in June 2022.

In 2025, Jones was inducted to the Gorsedd at a ceremony during the National Eisteddfod of Wales at Wrexham.

== Personal life ==
Jones has four children. As of 2025 he is living in Cardiff.

In 2014, Jones took part in the Marathon des Sables, in the Sahara Desert, with fellow Welsh actor Richard Harrington. In April 2018, he ran the inaugural Wales Marathon held in Newport.

Jones was one of the athletes taking part in IronMan Wales on 3 September 2023 to raise money for Head for Change, which will go direct to the education, care and support and potential treatments in rugby.

Jones is an ambassador for Believe Organ Donor Support, Marie Curie UK, and Cerebral Palsy Cymru.

== Filmography ==
=== Film ===
Year	Title	Role	Notes
1985	Morons from Outer Space	Godfrey	Credited as Mark Jones
1986	Valhalla	Voice of Odin	English version
1989	The Angry Earth	Guto	
1990	Paper Mask	Dr. Lloyd	
1999	Solomon & Gaenor	Crad Rees	
2003	Master and Commander: The Far Side of the World	Mr. Hogg	
2003	The Measure of My Days	Escapee	Short
2004	Troy	Tecton	
2006	Little White Lies	James, Dr.	
2006	Hydra	Jones	Short
2006	Daddy's Girl	Eisner	
2006	Calon Gaeth	Josi	
2007	Olas de verano	Steve Baldini	Short
2008	The Other Boleyn Girl	Brandon	
2008	Caught in the Act	Alan Williams	
2010	Robin Hood	Stone Mason Longstride	
2010	The Cursed Mirror	Sir Oswallt	Short
2013	A Viking Saga: The Darkest Day	Aethelwulf	
2014	Sniper: Legacy	Major Shope	Direct-to-video film
2015	Queen of the Desert	Frank Lascelles	
2015	Just Jim	Donald	
2015	Child 44	Tortoise	
2015	The Witcher 3: Wild Hunt - A Night to Remember	Letho of Gulet (voice)	Short. English version
2015	Yr Ymadawiad	Stanley	Also English version: The Passing
2016	The Lighthouse	Thomas Griffiths	
2016	Trespass Against Us	P.C. Pollock	
2017	Star Wars: The Last Jedi	Captain Moden Canady	
2018	Gwen	Mr. Wynne	
2018	Apostle	Quinn	
2018	Partridge in a Bear Tree	Bear	Short
2019	The Good Liar	Bryn	
2020	Rebecca	Inspector Welch	
2021	The Phantom of the Open	Cliff	
2021	Munich – The Edge of War	Sir Osmund Cleverly	
2022	Murmur	Roy	Short
2023	Bolan's Shoes	Geraint	
2023	Y Sŵn	William Whitelaw	
2023	Sweetland	Moses Sweetland	
2024	Portraits of Dangerous Women	Jon	
2025	Madam	Father Donaghy	Short
2026	Box of Frogs	Patrick	Short
2026	Star Wars: Gobaith Newydd	Darth Vader	Welsh dub of Star Wars: Episode IV – A New Hope

=== Television ===
Year	Title	Role	Notes
1989	The Shell Seekers	Danus	TV film
1989, 1991	The Play on One	Constable Davies / Ieuan	Two roles
1991	The Bill	Doctor	1 episode
1991	Heroes II: The Return	Royal Marine Maj.	
1992	Between the Lines	P.C. Terry Gilzean	
1995	Casualty	Allsop	
1995	A Mind to Kill	Geraint Humphries	
1996	Soldier Soldier	Capt. Jonathan Bell	
1996	Dangerfield	DI Dicky Sutton	
1996–1997	This Life	Dale Jones	Recurring role
1997	Bride of War	Platoon Commander	1 episode
1999	The Knock	David Ancrom	4th series; main role
2000	Where the Heart Is	Brian Price	
2000	Jason and the Argonauts	Mopsus	Mini-series
2001	The Infinite Worlds of H. G. Wells	Arthur Brownlow	Main role
2001	Tales from Pleasure Beach	Dunk	Mini-series
2001	The Mists of Avalon	King Uther Pendragon	
2001	Score	Tony	TV film
2001–2002	The Bench	Des Davies	Series regular
2002	A Mind to Kill	Gethin Purse	
2002	Y Tŷ	Jim	Series regular
2002	Holby City	Reece King	
2002	Lenny Blue	DC Huw Morgan	TV film
2003	Spooks	Mark Whooley	
2003	Red Cap	Sgt. Gary Jennings	
2003	Triongl	Dewi	S4C drama
2004	Murder Prevention	DS Ray Lloyd	
2004	Lie with Me	Paul Stebbings	TV film
2004	Murphy's Law	Simpson	
2004	The Welsh in Shakespeare	Various	TV film
2005	Waking the Dead	Tom McQueen	
2005	55 Degrees North	DI Russell Bing	Main role
2005–2008	Con Passionate	Irfon	Series regular
2006	Torchwood	John Ellis	Episode "Out of Time"
2006	Torchwood Declassified	Self / John Ellis	TV series
2006	Cravings	Eisner	
2006	Calon Gaeth	Josi Evans	
2006	Stick or Twist	Russ	Series regular
2006	Little White Lies	Dr. James	Series regular
2007–2008	The Commander	DI/DCI Doug James	4 episodes
2007–2009	Y Pris	Chief Constable Bryan Jones	Main role
2008	The Passion	Apostle Marcus	
2009	Zig Zag Love	Paul Carmichael	TV film
2009	Law and Order UK	Mark Powell	Episode: "Love and Loss"
2009	Framed	Dafydd Hughes	TV film
2009	Crash	Mr. Hill	Episode: #1.6
2009	Merlin	King Olaf	1 episode
2009	A Child's Christmases in Wales	Geraint Rhys	TV film
2009	Welsh Greats	Himself - Presenter	
2009	Top of the Cops	Himself / DCI Doug James	TV film
2009	Merlin: Secrets & Magic	Himself	TV series
2010	Pen Talar	Max	Episode: #1.6
2010	Bouquet of Barbed Wire	Simon Clark	
2011	Baker Boys	Pete	Series regular; 2 series
2011	Game of Thrones	Shagga	2 episodes
2011	Making of Game of Thrones	Shagga	Video
2011	Being Human	Richard Hargreaves	
2011	Silent Witness	D.I. Frank Skipper	
2012	Silk	Sergeant Major Chris Pierce	1 episode
2012	Casualty	Caleb Flack	
2012	Titanic	David Evans	
2012	Sinbad	Azdi	Episode: "Eye of the Tiger"
2012–2013, 2015–2017	Stella	Rob Morgan	Main role; series 1–2, 4–6
2013	Talking to the Dead	DCI Owen Jackson	
2013	Atlantis	Mac	1 episode
2014	37 Days	David Lloyd George	
2014	Under Milk Wood	Neighbour	TV film
2014	Puppy Love	Dave Wilson	
2015	Hinterland	John Bell	1 episode
2015	Father Brown	Arnold Francis	
2016	National Treasure	Gerry	Series regular
2016–2018	Byw Celwydd	Dylan Williams	Series regular; 3 series
2017	The Machine	Thompson	TV film
2017–2020	Keeping Faith	Steve Baldini	3 series
2018	Hidden	Endaf Elwy	2 episodes
2018	Flex Lewis: Superstar Bodybuilder	Himself - Narrator	TV film
2019	Chernobyl	General Vladimir Pikalov	Mini-series; 2 episodes
2019	Carnival Row	Magistrate Flute	Recurring role; series 1
2019	The Accident	Iwan Bevan	4 episodes
2019	The Crown	Dr. Edward Millward	"Tywysog Cymru" episode 6
2020	Gangs of London	Kinney Edwards	Main role; 5 episodes
2020	Cyswllt (Mewn COVID)	Daf	S4C drama
2020	The Third Day	Jason	Mini-series; 6 episodes & 1 special
2021	It's My Shout (I Am One)	Ron	Short Films from Wales
2021	The Pact	Father Martin	3 episodes
2022	The Tuckers	Mad Malcom	Series 3, episode 1: "Hard Man"
2022	Henry House	Dafydd Roberts	Pilot episode
2022–2023	Outlander	Tom Christie	Season 6 & 7: 9 episodes
2022, 2026	Dal Y Mellt	Mici	S4C drama - aka Rough Cut. Series 1 & 2; 8 episodes
2023	Men Up	Eddie O'Connor	TV film
2023	The Cleaner	Richard	Series 2, episode 6: "The Dead End"
2023	The Reckoning	Charles Hullighan	3 episodes
2023	Bodies	Andrew Morley	3 episodes
2023	Men Up	Eddie O'Connor	TV film
2024	The Way	Glynn	3 episodes
2024	Baby Reindeer	Gerald Dunn	Mini-series; 3 episodes
2024	The Red King	Gruffudd Prosser	5 episodes
2025	Out There	Caleb Williams	Mini-series; 6 episodes
2025	In the Room	General Livingston	Mini-series; 4 episodes
2025	The Light in the Hall	Rhys	Series 2; 6 episodes
2026	Waiting for the Out	Matthew Hall	Episode: #1.6
2026	Agatha Christie's Seven Dials	Sir Oswald Coote	Mini-series; 3 episodes
2026	Death Valley	Gareth Merwin	Episode: #2.2
TBA	The Last Detectives	DI Glyn Walsh	Main role; 6 episodes

=== Theatre ===
- Aston, The Caretaker, Sherman Theatre, Cardiff, 1990
- Lord Grey and Henry (Earl of Richmond), Richard III, Royal Shakespeare Company, London, 1993
- Leontes, The Winter's Tale, Globe Theatre, London, 1997
- Milantius, The Maid's Tragedy, Globe Theatre, 1997
- Mark Antony, Julius Caesar, Globe Theatre, 1999
- Taurus, Diomedes, and Sextus Pompeius, Antony and Cleopatra, Globe Theatre, 1999
- Appeared as Billy, Cardiff East, as Willy Nilly, Under Milk Wood, and as Bonario, Volpone, all National Theatre, London; as Costard, Love's Labour's Lost, as Lorenzo, The Merchant of Venice, and as Ferdinand, The Tempest, all Royal Shakespeare Company, Stratford-upon-Avon, England; as Tristram, Morte d'Arthur, and as Florizel and Antigonas, The Winter's Tale, both Lyric Theatre, London; as a pioneer, Ingolstadt, Gate Theatre; and as Danton and father, Snow Palace, Tricycle Theatre, Kilburn, Yorkshire, England
- JB Feller in The Man Who Had All the Luck by Arthur Miller at The Donmar Warehouse, 28 February – 5 April 2008
- Sergeant-Major Reg Drummond in Privates on Parade by Peter Nichols at Noël Coward Theatre, 1 December 2012 – 2 March 2013

=== Video games ===
Year	Title	Role (voice)	Notes
2009	Risen	Master Pallas / Alvaro / Cormac / Ilumar / Nelson	English version
2011	Dragon Age II	Ser Emeric / Veld / Paivel / additional voices	
2011	The Witcher 2: Assassins of Kings - Enhanced Edition	Letho of Gulet	English version
2011	Warhammer 40,000: Space Marine	Nemeroth / Thrax	
2011	Ni No Kuni: Wrath of the White Witch	Kublai	English version
2011	Star Wars: The Old Republic	Colonel Vrain / Darth Andru / additional voices	
2013	Puppeteer	General Dog	
2014	Castlevania: Lords of Shadow 2	Guido / Cleric / Scientist / Soldier	
2015	The Witcher 3: Wild Hunt	Letho of Gulet	English version
2025	Warhammer 40,000: Space Marine – Master Crafted Edition	Nemeroth / Thrax	

=== Radio ===
- Appeared in radio broadcasts of Cadfael and Cocaine
- Samson in Julian Simpson's The Listener
