= Murder Prevention =

- Genre: Crime drama
- Created by: Declan Croghan
- Written by: Declan Croghan
- Directed by: Justin Chadwick; Julian Simpson; Jeremy Lovering
- Starring: Conor Mullen; Mark Lewis Jones; Sean Gallagher; Michael Smiley; Sarah Smart; Tom Brooke; Badria Timimi; Peter Wight; Kerry Elkins
- Country of origin: United Kingdom
- Original language: English
- No. of series: 1
- No. of episodes: 6

Production
- Executive producers: Simon Heath; Declan Croghan
- Producer: Eleanor Greene
- Cinematography: Kieran McGuigan
- Editors: Jonathan Amos; David Head; Paul Knight
- Running time: 50 minutes
- Production company: World Productions

Original release
- Network: Five
- Release: 30 October – 4 December 2004

Murder Prevention is a six-part British television crime drama series, written and created by Declan Croghan, that first broadcast on Five on 30 October 2004. Inspired by the real-life Homicide Prevention Unit within the Metropolitan Police, the series follows a unit headed up by DCI Patrick Goddard (Conor Mullen), who attempt to prevent murders from taking place by using modern scientific techniques and basic police instinct to gather enough evidence of intent to kill in order to arrest potential murderers before they offend. According to Croghan, "Murder Prevention is the first pre-crime drama ever, anywhere."

The series was produced by World Productions, who had previously produced BAFTA-award-winning police procedural television series The Cops. The series consists of three two-part stories, although later repeats edited the two-parters into three longer running episodes.

Also credited as principal members of the cast are Mark Lewis Jones as Mullen's second-in-command, DS Ray Lloyd; Sean Gallagher as Lloyd's wingman, DC Neil Stanton; Tom Brooke as DC Mark Rosen, a rookie profiler; and Michael Smiley and Sarah Smart as DCs Maurice Gibney and Karen Hughes. The series was due for release on DVD on 20 February 2006 via Target Media, although due to the company's collapse, was never released. The series remains unreleased on DVD.

== Cast ==
- Conor Mullen as Patrick Goddard; detective chief inspector
- Mark Lewis Jones as Ray Lloyd; detective sergeant
- Sean Gallagher as Neil Stanton; detective constable
- Michael Smiley as Maurice Gibney; detective constable
- Sarah Smart as Karen Hughes; detective constable
- Tom Brooke as Mark Rosen; detective constable
- Badria Timimi as Louise Cole; legal counsel
- Peter Wight as Donald Winkler; commander
- Kerry Elkins as Kerry Phillips; forensic analyst

== Episodes ==
No.	Title	Directed by	Written by	British air date	UK viewers (million)
1	"False Prophet (Part 1)"	Justin Chadwick	Declan Croghan	30 October 2004	1.71
James Gibson (Bo Poraj), a sex offender with a previous conviction for rape, comes onto the team's radar after carrying out a series of violet attacks on women. Ray organises a sting to catch Gibson in the act after he becomes infatuated with Sally Brook (Christine Bottomley), a single woman who lives on his estate, but the op turns sour after the team fail to recover a crucial piece of evidence. Meanwhile, Mark Rosen (Tom Brooke), a trainee criminal profiler and newcomer to the team, is tasked to investigate a recently released convicted child sex offender, Paul Cullen (Tom Bennett), whom prison staff suspect may carry out his former cellmate, Leon Bracken (William Armstrong)'s work upon his release. Bracken, a seemingly reformed child killer, has sent Cullen letters from prison which contain bible code - instructions which Mark suspects may lead to murder.
2	"False Prophet (Part 2)"	Justin Chadwick	Declan Croghan	6 November 2004	1.29
Mark leads the team into Cullen's lair, where he finds a number of drawings depicting dismembered bodies and the corpse of a decapitated dog. In an attempt to get closer to Cullen, Maurice continues to befriend his mother, Carole (Tilly Vosburgh), while the team stage a gas leak as a cover for planting cameras in his house. Karen's review of surveillance footage of Cullen identifies three possible victims, who are all members of Cullen's under 13s football team. Meanwhile, Gibson is released on bail after his brief Andrew Ainsworth (Rick Warden) tears apart the team's case during the pre-trial hearing. Ray later receives a distress call from Sally Brook and arrives at her flat to find her unconscious, having taken an overdose of prescription drugs. Ray is outraged when Sally later dies in hospital, and decides to implement his own form of justice on Gibson.
3	"Last Man Out (Part One)"	Julian Simpson	Declan Croghan	13 November 2004	Under 1.15
Michelle Wynne (Myanna Buring), a university student found drugged and gagged in the street, is the latest in a long line of female victims attacked after drinking at the 505 nightclub in East London. With each and every attack becoming more violent, Mark and Karen are tasked with mounting an operation to catch the offender before his crimes escalate to murder. Karen is sent undercover posing as a barmaid in an attempt to identify the perpetrator. Meanwhile, Ray and Neil are on the trail of Una McCready (Aislinn Sands), a contract killer with connections to the IRA. With the help of an Irish government official, Fergus Fallon (Frank McCusker), they try to identify Una's possible target. Back at the club, Karen begins to grow close to DJ Dean Becker (Danny Nussbaum), and Mark's profile of the offender puts club boss David Gill (Ronnie Fox) firmly in the frame.
4	"Last Man Out (Part Two)"	Julian Simpson	Declan Croghan	20 November 2004	1.29
Ray and Neil trail Una to a London hotel, where a group of leading Lebanese businessmen are organising an Oil conference. Ray is surprised to discover that one of the men pictured in surveillance photos of the hotel, a political activist known as the 'Madhi' (Hassani Shapi), is on record as having died five years ago. Having been banned from entering the United Kingdom and the United States for inciting violence through hate speech, Ray identifies the Madhi as a possible target, and Goddard pays him a visit to warn him of the impending hit. Meanwhile, Karen is forced to act as bait to confirm Gill's involvement in the attacks. She stages an argument with Dean in order to get Gill on side, but Gill fails to respond. After being criticised by Goddard, Karen apologises to Dean and decides to drown her sorrows, unaware she is putting herself right into the path of danger.
5	"Judgement Day (Part One)"	Jeremy Lovering	Edward Canfor-Dumas	27 November 2004	1.21
Gary Robins (Matthew Dunster), a convicted arsonist, is released from prison after winning an appeal to have his conviction overturned based upon an alibi given to the police for his whereabouts on the night of the alleged incident, which was never used in court. A former Scotland Yard commander approaches Wicker and asks him to task Goddard and the team with tracking Robins due to the strong likelihood that he will reoffend. Ray is sent undercover in a half-way house to rank up the pressure on Robins, while Karen and Neil continue surveillance from outside. Meanwhile, Maurice and Mark are tasked with investigating Gemma Andrews (Nikki Amuka-Bird), a violent prostitute convicted of the murder of one of her former clients, who has recently gone back on the game and has since attacked another of her punters, RE teacher Daniel Crayfield (Michael Moreland).
6	"Judgement Day (Part Two)"	Jeremy Lovering	Edward Canfor-Dumas	4 December 2004	Under 1.20
Following the fire at the half-way house, Neil finds his trust in Ray quickly diminishing, much to the point that he approaches Goddard and asks him for a transfer out of the unit. When he interviews the wife of Robins' former landlord, Clive Lawrence (Sean Baker) he discovers that the alibi he provided Robins for the night of the murder was more watertight than previously thought - but for a much more sinister reason. Goddard begins to suspect that Wayne Sullivan (Daniel Cerqueira) could be responsible for the latest fire in an attempt to frame Robins, and when he finds a number of firearms in Sullivan's flat, he realises both Robins and Ray could be in grave danger. Meanwhile, Mark identifies a pattern in Gemma's diaries that signifies when she is next likely to offend, forcing Maurice to offer himself up as bait in an attempt to make Gemma implicate herself.
