= The Passing (2015 film) =

- Yr Ymadawiad
- Directed by: Gareth Bryn
- Written by: Ed Talfan
- Produced by: Kate Crowther, Ed Talfan
- Starring: Mark Lewis Jones
- Distributed by: Miracle Communications
- Release dates: September 2015 (Fantastic Fest); 8 April 2016 (UK)
- Running time: 89 minutes
- Country: United Kingdom
- Languages: Welsh; English (separate versions)
- Budget: c. £540,000

The Passing (Welsh: Yr Ymadawiad) is a 2015 Welsh drama film directed by Gareth Bryn and written by Ed Talfan. It had its UK premiere on 10 March 2016 at the Wales One World (WOW) Film Festival in Aberystwyth, with a general release date of 8 April 2016.

== Synopsis ==
Following a car crash in a remote part of Wales, Iwan and Sara find themselves in a river with Sara unconscious. They are rescued by Stanley, who carries Sara back to his isolated house in a cold, wet landscape above the river. Stanley puts Sara to bed and she slowly recovers.

The couple wonder about their solitary host, who is a man of few words. Stanley carries on with his life, preparing food, fetching water and digging a well on the hillside below the house. As the days pass and the couple recover from their trauma, elements of their past are revealed, suggesting they are running from somewhere or something. They consider the possibility of staying long term. "Everything we need is here," says Sara. "We can stop running."

Stanley shows a voyeuristic fascination towards the couple, particularly Sara while she is recuperating in the house. Sara talks to Stanley and he reveals some of his past. Iwan becomes jealous of this developing relationship with his girlfriend. Iwan eventually confronts Stanley outside the house and, either deliberately pushed or by accident, ends up falling down the well.

Meanwhile Sara, when she attempts to wash herself in the basin, has been having unexplained flashbacks about drowning. In a final twist during the last few minutes of the film, Sara's flashback reveals the true nature of her situation.

== Cast ==
- Dyfan Dwyfor as Iwan
- Annes Elwy as Sara
- Mark Lewis Jones as Stanley

== Production ==
Talfan originally imagined the film to be without dialogue, but later conceded some talking would be required (though the first ten minutes of the film are without dialogue). The film was shot near Tregaron in West Wales. The film crew were based for four weeks in a disused school building without any mobile phone reception, which Bryn says instilled a necessary "siege mentality". With a small budget and no pressure from big financial backers, Bryn says he was able to set about making exactly the film he wanted.

Back to back versions were recorded in Welsh and in English. Much of the film was recorded using hand held cameras and natural lighting.

== Reception ==
The film had its UK premiere on 10 March 2016 at the Wales One World (WOW) Film Festival in Aberystwyth, with a general release date of 8 April 2016. It had its television debut on the Welsh language channel, S4C, on 13 August 2017.

The Hollywood Reporter summarised the film as containing "far too few jolts to appeal to garden variety horror fans. But the highbrow contingent will respond well at fests, and Bryn's quiet confidence earns him a spot on filmmaker-to-watch lists." Jones is described as "good at using minimal cues to suggest a large interior world. It's a performance intriguing enough that one might have been content to watch Stanley spend the length of a feature interacting only with himself and his land, saying nothing aloud, in Welsh or otherwise."

Similarly The Guardian concludes that the "gradual excavation, with its spectral presences, may disappoint those who demand more bang for their buck", but the assured acting and melancholy feel "ensures it lingers longer in the mind than most homegrown genre fare".

Based on a small number of reviews, the Rotten Tomatoes website gave The Passing a 63% approval rating.

== Awards ==
The Passing/Yr Ymadawiad received a silver medal at both the World International Television Festival and New York Film and Television Awards. It won a Single Drama Award at the Celtic Media Festival in Dungarvan, Ireland.

At the 2016 BAFTA Cymru awards, Ed Talfan won Best Author award, Best Production Design award went to Tim Dickel, while Mark Lewis Jones won Best Actor.

== See also ==
- Cinema of Wales
