= House of America =

- Directed by: Marc Evans
- Written by: Ed Thomas
- Produced by: Sheryl Crown; Hans de Weers; David Green; Gina Carter
- Starring: Siân Phillips; Matthew Rhys; Steven Mackintosh; Lisa Palfrey
- Cinematography: Pierre Aim
- Edited by: Michiel Reichwein
- Music by: John Cale
- Production company: Egmond Film & Television
- Distributed by: First Independent Films
- Release date: 10 October 1997 (UK)
- Running time: 95 minutes
- Country: United Kingdom
- Language: English

House of America is a 1997 Welsh film directed by Marc Evans. The film, set in a depressed Welsh mining town, centres on a dysfunctional family unit of brothers Boyo and Sid, their sister Gwenny and their controlling mother. The film tackles issues such as Welsh identity, its need for indigenous heroes and the nation's perceived inferiority complex.

The film was the theatrical debut for director Marc Evans, and the film won him the 'Best Directorial Debut' award at the Stockholm International Film Festival. The film also took four awards at the 1998 BAFTA Cymru awards.

It is a part of the cultural era known as Cool Cymru along with other similar independent films of the time.

== Cast ==
- Siân Phillips as Mam
- Matthew Rhys as Boyo
- Steven Mackintosh as Sid
- Lisa Palfrey as Gwenny
- Steve Speirs as The Head
- Richard Harrington as Cat
