= In My Skin (TV series) =

British television series

- Genre: Coming of age; Dark comedy
- Created by: Kayleigh Llewellyn
- Written by: Kayleigh Llewellyn
- Directed by: Lucy Forbes; Molly Manners
- Starring: Gabrielle Creevy; James Wilbraham; Poppy Lee Friar; Jo Hartley; Aled ap Steffan; Di Botcher; Rhodri Meilir
- Country of origin: United Kingdom
- Original language: English
- No. of series: 2
- No. of episodes: 10

Production
- Executive producer: Nerys Evans
- Producer: Sophie Francis
- Production locations: Cardiff, Wales
- Editors: Kate Daughton; Paul Forde
- Running time: 25–48 minutes
- Production company: Expectation Entertainment

Original release
- Network: BBC Three
- Release: 14 October 2018 – 7 November 2021

In My Skin is a British comedy drama television series written by Kayleigh Llewellyn that premiered on BBC Three on 14 October 2018. The series was initially ordered as a short film for BBC Wales, but this later acted as the pilot episode after BBC ordered In My Skin as a full series.

The series stars Gabrielle Creevy, James Wilbraham, Poppy Lee Friar, Jo Hartley, Aled ap Steffan, Di Botcher, Georgia Furlong and Rhodri Meilir.

In March 2021, In My Skin was renewed for a second and final series, which premiered on 7 November 2021.

The series has received critical acclaim, winning the 2022 BAFTA TV Award for best drama series as well as numerous awards from ceremonies including BAFTA Cymru and the RTS Programme Awards.

== Premise ==
In My Skin focuses on teenager Bethan who is trying to live a double life as she negotiates her mother's mental illness, friendships and her sexuality. Her mother has bipolar disorder, and is sectioned in a psychiatric ward. Bethan dreams of being a writer, but attends a hostile and homophobic school.

== Cast and characters ==
=== Main ===
- Gabrielle Creevy as Bethan, a 16-year-old school student who is hiding her troubled home life from people at school and also deals with embracing her lesbianism
- James Wilbraham as Travis, a gay school student who is best friends with Bethan and Lydia
- Poppy Lee Friar as Lydia, a rule breaking school student who is best friends with Bethan and Travis
- Jo Hartley as Katrina, Bethan's mother who has bipolar disorder
- Aled ap Steffan as Stan Priest, a school student who bullies Bethan
- Di Botcher as Nana Margie, Bethan's grandmother
- Rhodri Meilir as Dilwyn, Bethan's alcoholic father

=== Recurring ===
- Zadeiah Campbell-Davies as Poppy, a popular girl who encourages Bethan to kiss her - then drops her.
- Alexandria Riley as Miss Morgan, a sarcastic English teacher who supports Bethan's creativity
- Suzanne Packer as Nurse Digby, a nurse at the psychiatric hospital
- Laura Checkley as Ms Blocker, a tough lesbian PE teacher who originally dislikes Bethan but later softens to her
- Richard Corgan as Tony Chipper, an employee at the chip shop who takes advantage of Lydia (series 1)
- Georgia Furlong as Lorraine, an unpopular girl who desperately wants to be friends with Poppy
- Jac Yarrow as Jamie, a student who helps Bethan with her campaign posters (series 1)
- Dave Wong as Alfred, a mentally ill patient at the hospital (series 1)
- Lu Corfield as Head Teacher, the headteacher of the school
- Ellen Robertson as Jodie, a nurse on the psychiatric ward (series 1)
- Rebekah Murrell as Cam, a lesbian student who Bethan begins dating (series 2)
- Steffan Rhodri as Perry, a kind man Katrina forms a relationship with behind Dilwyn's back (series 2).
- Olivia Southgate as Ffion, Perry's young daughter, a very sweet girl who has Down Syndrome (series 2).

== Production ==
In My Skin was initially ordered as a short film for BBC Wales, which was filmed across five days. This later acted as the pilot episode when BBC Three ordered In My Skin as a full series. Produced by Expectation Entertainment, it acts as the company's first scripted commission. Creator and writer Kayleigh Llewellyn stated that her draft for the series was "warmly received" by the BBC, and director Lucy Forbes joined the project due to "the power of the subject matter". Llewellyn explained that she and casting director Rachel Sheridan were focused on having local Welsh actors appear in the series, as they could bring the "characters to life". The series is filmed in Cardiff, Wales. The first series was, according to Llewellyn, "written in five weeks, shot in five weeks and shot on a budget of £500." In March 2021, BBC renewed In My Skin for a second and final series. Llewellyn stated that she was excited to "finish telling Bethan's story", and that in the writing process she was "oscillating between laughing uproariously and ugly crying". Molly Manners was chosen to direct the second series, with Llewellyn voicing her excitement at Manners' involvement. Filming for the second series commenced on 29 March 2021 in Cardiff. Filming wrapped on 1 May 2021. The second series premiered on 7 November 2021.

== Episodes ==
Series	Episodes	Originally released	
Series	Episodes	First released	Last released
1	5	18 October 2018	29 March 2020
2	5	7 November 2021	

=== Series 1 (2018–2020) ===
No. overall	No. in series	Title	Directed by	Written by	Original release date
1	1	"Pilot"	Lucy Forbes	Kayleigh Llewellyn	14 October 2018
Bethan spends the evening in the park with friends Travis and Lydia, and when Lydia offers them drugs, she pretends to take one. Bethan's mother Katrina washes the car and plays loud music on the street in the middle of the night, so Bethan takes her to the hospital. Travis and Lydia, ask where she was, and she lies by saying she was seeing a production of Chicago. While climbing up a rope in PE, Bethan begins to bleed from her period, and Stan points it out and embarrasses her. She later visits her mother in hospital, and Katrina has a manic episode and blames Bethan for being sectioned. She calls her grandmother Margie, who promises to visit her and Katrina.
2	2	"Episode 2"	Lucy Forbes	Kayleigh Llewellyn	29 March 2020
Bethan's poem is published in a poetry anthology, and she realises she wants to write a book. Margie asks if she wants to live with her rather than her drunk dad Dilwyn, but she declines. Disruptive classmate Stan slaps Bethan in the face with a tuna sandwich, and the pair get a detention from Mrs Blocker. While in detention, she receives a call saying her mother is dead. She races to the hospital, where she learns that a mentally ill patient found her number and tricked her. After she leaves, she meets classmate Poppy, and rather than telling her about her parents, she says her grandmother is ill. When she returns home, Dilwyn is drunk and has thrown a party, so Bethan leaves. She receives a text from Poppy, who asks when she can see Bethan again.
3	3	"Episode 3"	Lucy Forbes	Kayleigh Llewellyn	29 March 2020
Bethan makes an effort to look nice for school by wearing makeup and straightening her hair, but is pulled in by Mrs Blocker for breaking school rules. While taking the makeup off in the toilets, Poppy sees her and invites Bethan to sit with her in English class, and invites her to revise with her after school. While walking out, Stan makes homophobic remarks about the two, and they insult him and run away. She goes home during a free period, and finds her mum home. She goes missing, and Bethan finds her hovering at a cash machine. When Margie turns up at the house, Bethan gets her to look after Katrina while she goes to Poppy's house. Lydia celebrates her birthday with Travis, and when they ask where Bethan is, she tells them she's in A&E with her dad. Lydia gets drunk, and is taken home by Tony Chippy. After falling asleep with Poppy, she gets up to leave, waking her. Poppy reveals she is dating classmate Jamie. Bethan leaves, and returns home to find Katrina has been tied to a radiator by Dilwyn.
4	4	"Episode 4"	Lucy Forbes	Kayleigh Llewellyn	29 March 2020
Bethan's English teacher, Ms Morgan, turns up at her house and questions why she did not show up for an exam. Bethan tells her that she was ill, and that she wants to resit the exam. At school, Poppy gets Bethan alone, strokes her hand and says she could die happy if she could have this every day. Bethan leans in close and they kiss. Dilwyn takes Katrina to the cliffs and tries to get her to drink lager. She refuses because of her meds. He threatens to drive them both off the cliff but she wrests the steering wheel off him and escapes the car. That night Poppy texts to meet on the park. to see her. She tells Bethan that she is dating Jamie and told him that Bethan kissed her. She does not want Bethan to ruin her chance of being head girl. In retaliation, Bethan applies to be head girl.
5	5	"Episode 5"	Lucy Forbes	Kayleigh Llewellyn	29 March 2020
Bethan enlists Travis and Peter's help to run a campaign for head girl, and Lorraine, former best friend of Poppy, shows her support. Bethan reconciles with Lydia, and alongside Travis, the three confront Tony Chippy and his wife about him sleeping with Lydia. Bethan makes her campaign speech, and to her surprise, is voted head girl. Poppy, who is deputy head girl, pretends to be happy for Bethan, and says that she can now concentrate on her Duke of Edinburgh project. After school, Bethan goes to visit Katrina in the hospital and tells her about winning head girl. She dances with the patients, but stops when she realises Poppy, who is there for her Duke of Edinburgh service volunteering, has arrived with another girl and is watching her.

=== Series 2 (2021) ===
No. overall	No. in series	Title	Directed by	Written by	Original release date
6	1	"Episode 1"	Molly Manners	Kayleigh Llewellyn	8 November 2021
While out drinking with Lydia and Travis, Katrina approaches Bethan in her work uniform from the local bingo hall, embarrassing her. Katrina realises Bethan is embarrassed of her and goes home alone. Bethan meets new student Cam and is happy to learn she is a lesbian from the ever-helpful and super-honest Lorraine. She offers to give Cam a tour of the town which results in the pair kissing in Cam's car. When Bethan leaves Cam's car, she notices her mother in another car, kissing a man; she then realises that Katrina is having an affair.
7	2	"Episode 2"	Molly Manners	Kayleigh Llewellyn	8 November 2021
Bethan goes on a university visit with her year group. Whilst drinking with Travis, Lydia, Poppy and Stan, Lydia questions why Poppy is there. Bethan reveals that the two shared a kiss but that they are friends. Bethan confronts Trina on seeing her kissing a man in a car and Trina affirms that she is having an affair. She asks Bethan to meet him and his daughter, Perry and Ffion. Once they meet, Bethan forms a bond with them. After seeing her father in town, Bethan goes to meet Perry and Ffion and her father follows her.
8	3	"Episode 3"	Molly Manners	Kayleigh Llewellyn	8 November 2021
Bethan and Cam plan to move to Marseille together once they have finished school. She announces her plans to her friendship group, while Travis states that he will attend university. Lydia becomes upset at the thought of her best friends leaving her and they assure her that they will always be friends. Bethan introduces Cam to Katrina and Margie at the bingo hall and they all get on well. Bethan and Katrina smell smoke and find Dilwyn in the garden burning his clothes. He tells them that he is burning evidence due to having murdered Perry and Ffion; he grabs Katrina violently and locks himself inside the house. Bethan runs to Perry's house to find the fire and ambulance service in attendance. But father and daughter are alive. Bethan tells the police that her father is responsible for the arson and they arrest him.
9	4	"Episode 4"	Molly Manners	Kayleigh Llewellyn	8 November 2021
Whilst waiting to make a statement on her father's involvement with the fire, Katrina suffers from an episode. Bethan asks Cam to pick them up to take Katrina to the mental health hospital. The next day at school, Bethan pretends that nothing has happened which Cam does not entertain; she then explains Katrina's history with bipolar and says that she will not be able to accompany her to Marseille due to caring for her mother. Bethan visits Katrina at the hospital to find Dilwyn there manipulating Katrina into being with him. Bethan visits Perry, who tells her that he cannot be with her mother due to needing to protect himself and Ffion from Dilwyn's potential future attacks.
10	5	"Episode 5"	Molly Manners	Kayleigh Llewellyn	8 November 2021
Cam leaves for Marseille without saying a final goodbye to Bethan. Bethan shows up at Travis' door and asks if she can stay with him until school finishes. Whilst at school, Stan confronts Bethan and reveals to the school that her father petrol bombed Perry's house, and when Poppy hears, she tells her classmates about Katrina being in a mental health hospital. Bethan arranges for Katrina to be secretly transported to another city. Bethan has an in-depth conversation with Katrina about her feelings of unhappiness with her life; Katrina advises her to leave her city and make the most of her life. Bethan applies to university and is accepted, and after saying her final goodbyes to Travis, Lydia and her family, she leaves and tells herself that she is finally proud of herself.

== Reception ==
=== Critical reception ===
For the first series, the review aggregator website Rotten Tomatoes reported a 100% approval rating with an average rating of 7.2/10, based on 15 critic reviews. Metacritic, which uses a weighted average, assigned a score of 78 out of 100 based on 8 critics, indicating "generally favorable reviews".

Rhiannon Lucy Cosslett of The Guardian described In My Skin as "an emotional rollercoaster of a TV drama", writing that it is " a series of huge emotional heft, and an extraordinary achievement by writer Kayleigh Llewellyn, who surely has huge things ahead of her". The Sunday Times listed the series as a "critics' choice", writing that it is a "mesmerising drama", adding that Creevy and Hartley's performances were "remarkable". Annie Lord, writing for The Independent, described In My Skin as a "hilariously dark coming-of-age drama [that] cuts deep", and that "Llewellyn's dialogue is caustic and sharp". Time listed it as one of the best five television series of July 2020. Time wrote: "A combination of black humor, raw depictions of trauma and authentic performances mark the series as part of the same wave of British TV that includes auteurs like Phoebe Waller-Bridge and Michaela Coel. Llewellyn may not be the public face of her show, the way those women are, but she too is speaking from the heart—and her message resonates". In November 2021, the second series of this Welsh comedy drama would receive 5 stars in Rebecca Nicholson's Guardian TV review, stating that it is "a poignant must-see which deserves widespread acclaim".

=== Awards and nominations ===
Year	Organisation	Category	Nominee(s)	Result	Ref.
2019	BAFTA Cymru	Actress	Gabrielle Creevy	Won	
2019	BAFTA Cymru	Television Drama	In My Skin	Won	
2020	RTS CYMRU Wales	Industry	Expectation Entertainment	Won	
2020	BAFTA Cymru	Actress	Gabrielle Creevy	Nominated	
2020	BAFTA Cymru	Director: Fiction	Lucy Forbes	Won	
2020	BAFTA Cymru	Television Drama	In My Skin	Nominated	
2020	BAFTA Cymru	Writer	Kayleigh Llewellyn	Won	
2020	RTS Craft & Design Awards	Make Up Design - Entertainment & Non Drama	Kate Roberts and Team	Nominated	
2021	RTS Programme Awards	Drama Series	In My Skin	Won	
2022	RTS Programme Awards	Actor (Female)	Gabrielle Creevy	Won	
2022	RTS Programme Awards	Drama Series	In My Skin	Won	
2022	RTS Craft & Design Awards	Casting Award	Rachel Sheridan	Nominated	
2022	British Academy Television Awards	Best Drama	In My Skin	Won	
2022	British Academy Television Awards	Best Writer: Drama	Kayleigh Llewellyn	Won	
