= Llan-ar-goll-en =

2013 Welsh Children's TV programme

- Genre: Comedy; Mystery
- Created by: Siwan Jobbins
- Written by: Matthew Glyn Jones; Anna-Lisa Jenaer; Andrew Jones; Ciaran Murtagh; Geraint Morgan; Huw Maredudd; Bethan Gwanas; Rhys ap Trefor (series 2)
- Directed by: Rhys D. Williams
- Starring: Rhys ap Trefor; Dyfrig Evans; Siw Hughes; Eiry Thomas; Catrin Mara; Hefin Wyn; Rhodri Sion; Carys John; Gwydion Rhys
- Voices of: Siwan Bowen Davies; Lisa Jên Brown; Emyr Roberts
- Theme music composer: Dyfan Jones
- Opening theme: "Llan-ar-goll-en Main Title" by Rhydian Bowen Phillips
- Ending theme: "Llan-ar-goll-en Main Title" (instrumental)
- Country of origin: United Kingdom (Wales)
- Original language: Welsh
- No. of seasons: 2
- No. of episodes: 51

Production
- Producer: Siwan Jobbins
- Production locations: Portmeirion, Wales
- Running time: 12–14 minutes 26 minutes ("Ceirw Coll Siôn Corn" only)
- Production companies: Twt Productions; Cwmni Da

Original release
- Network: S4C ("Cyw" block)
- Release: 23 December 2013 – 14 March 2016

Llan-ar-goll-en is a Welsh-language live action/animated children's television show created by Siwan Jobbins for S4C, and produced by Twt Productions and Cwmni Da. The show follows the adventures of two detectives; human Prys ar Frys and Ceri the Dog-tective, who manage to solve many mysteries in the titular village. It ran for 2 series with 51 episodes (including a half-hour Christmas special) from 23 December 2013 to 14 March 2016.

The show was filmed in Portmeirion, Wales, and notably features animated animal characters (such as one of the main characters, Ceri) interacting with a live action environment. The animation was done by Cloth Cat Animation using Flash animation. The title of the show is a pun on the Welsh town of Llangollen, and the Welsh term for lost, "ar goll".

== Plot ==
In the small, village of Llan-ar-goll-en, Wales, things are known to go missing all the time. Luckily for its citizens in dire need, two detectives that are very different from each other; Prys ar Frys the human, and his animated dog sidekick, Ceri, are known for solving mysteries and finding lost things. Whenever there's trouble, a siren is alarmed and Prys and Ceri are immediately on the case.

== Characters ==
=== Humans ===
- Prys ar Frys (played by Rhys ap Trefor) is a detective, and Ceri's human friend. He is always in a rush as he tends to jump to conclusions. He loves food, especially chips.
- Radli Migins (played by Dyfrig Evans) is a postman with a magic, flying bike named Elsi. He often crashes his bike. This character was interviewed in the Welsh Cyw series "Helo Shwmae" on 23 April 2021.
- Barti Felyn (played by Rhodri Sion) is a mischievous, unintelligible pirate who lives on a boat. His cat is Ianto.
- Dr. Jim Clem (played by Hefin Wyn) is an old man and an inventor.
- Arwel Achub (played by Gwydion Rhys) is a man with a green hat who performs many jobs in the village.
- Mrs. Tomos Ty Twt (played by Eiry Thomas) is a sweet, old and adventurous grandma.
- Tara Tan Toc (played by Catrin Mara) is a woman with pink hair who runs a beauty salon. She has a crush on Prys, and his feelings towards her have been shown to be mutual.
- Beti Becws (played by Siw Hughes) is a baker.
- AbracaDebra (played by Carys John) is a magician.
- Mia Pia (played by Miriam Isaac) likes animals, but they don't like her.

=== Animals ===
- Ceri the Dog-tective (voiced by Siwan Bowen Davies) is Prys' dog friend. She's more sensible and thinks things through. Her cousin is Caradog.
- Ianto is Barti's yellow pirate-cat who sometimes translates what his unintelligible owner is saying.
- Sugar Lump is Mrs. Tomos' red cat. Unlike Ceri and Ianto, he doesn't talk, but rather makes cat noises.

== Production ==
Llan-ar-goll-en was conceived by Siwan Jobbins and is a co-production between Twt Productions and Cwmni Da, with animation services provided by Cloth Cat Animation using Flash animation. The show utilizes both live action and animation, the latter of which was implemented for animal characters like Ceri the Dog-tective and her cousin Caradog, Ianto, and Sugar Lumps. The show was shot in the coastal village of Portmeirion, Wales.

The main title was composed by Dyfan Jones and performed by Rhydian Bowen Phillips, with the choir performed by the students of Ysgol Gynradd Gymraeg Santes Tudful.

== Episodes ==
All 51 episodes aired on S4C's "Cyw" block in Welsh with English subtitles made available. The first series aired from 23 December 2013 to 17 November 2014 with 26 episodes.

A Christmas special, and the start of the second series, aired on 24 December 2014, and the first half of the series started regularly airing from 2 March to 18 May 2015. Another Christmas special aired on 24 December 2015, and the rest of the series continued from 4 January to 14 March 2016 with 25 episodes.

Series	Episodes	Originally released	
Series	Episodes	First released	Last released
1	26	23 December 2013	17 November 2014
2	25	24 December 2014	14 March 2016

=== Series 1 (2013–14) ===
No.	Title	Directed by	Written by	Original release date
1	"Y Parsel Coll"	Rhys D. Williams	Unknown	23 December 2013
Tara Tan Toc expects a very special parcel but it doesn't arrive.
2	"Olwyn Coll"	Rhys D. Williams	Unknown	30 December 2013
Radli Migins the postman falls off his bike again on a stormy day, and as he goes off to find something to help him mend his bike, his wheel goes missing.
3	"Orennau"	Rhys D. Williams	Unknown	6 January 2014
Prys and Ceri have to solve the mystery of missing oranges.
4	"Y Sioe Lysiau"	Rhys D. Williams	Unknown	13 January 2014
Radli's bike pump is stolen as he prepares to go to the annual vegetable show.
5	"Mwstash"	Rhys D. Williams	Unknown	20 January 2014
Everyone has a go at a moustache growing competition in Llan-ar-goll-en, but something happens to Arwel Achub's moustache as it disappears overnight.
6	"Sanau"	Rhys D. Williams	Unknown	27 January 2014
Socks have gone missing in the village.
7	"Parti Sypreis"	Rhys D. Williams	Unknown	3 February 2014
A birthday present for Tara Tan Toc goes missing before her surprise party.
8	"Pastai"	Rhys D. Williams	Unknown	10 February 2014
Beti's recipe book goes missing.
9	"Wig Tara"	Rhys D. Williams	Unknown	17 February 2014
Radli has a very important parcel to deliver to Tara from Paris. The parcel contains a new wig for Tara, which she wants the whole of Llan-ar-goll-en to see.
10	"Baner Barti"	Rhys D. Williams	Unknown	24 February 2014
When it's very windy in Llan-ar-goll-en, Barti's flag disappears.
11	"Beic Radli"	Rhys D. Williams	Unknown	3 March 2014
Radli Migins's magic bike, Elsi, had disappeared.
12	"Pop"	Rhys D. Williams	Unknown	10 March 2014
Radli has a parcel with no name on it, but neither Arwel nor Beti expect anything in the post. A huge explosion then rocks Llan-ar-goll-en and the parcel explodes.
13	"Môr-ladron"	Rhys D. Williams	Unknown	17 March 2014
A pirate-themed tea party was being prepared, but the cake disappeared.
14	"Caws Ogla Ofnadwy!"	Rhys D. Williams	Unknown	30 June 2014
Beti Becws prepares her world famous "awful smelling" cheese.
15	"Y Darlun Coll"	Rhys D. Williams	Unknown	25 August 2014
Arwel Achub is invited to paint the Mayor's portrait, but before he finishes it, the portrait disappears. Prys suspects a number of the villagers is behind it.
16	"Smonach y Siocled"	Rhys D. Williams	Unknown	1 September 2014
Things in the village are turning into chocolate.
17	"Cist Barti"	Rhys D. Williams	Unknown	8 September 2014
Barti Felyn and Ianto the cat-pirate tell the story of Brave Barti's adventures on the high seas.
18	"Canu La La"	Rhys D. Williams	Unknown	15 September 2014
Tara Tan Toc loses her voice just hours before her magnificent concert in the village hall.
19	"Am Stori!"	Rhys D. Williams	Unknown	29 September 2014
Mrs. Tomos TyTwt writes a book, but just minutes after she finishes telling her friends about it, the story disappears.
20	"Dirgelwch y Llythyr Coll"	Rhys D. Williams	Unknown	6 October 2014
Ceri has a heavy cold and doesn't feel well enough to help Prys with his detective work.
21	"Mwww!"	Rhys D. Williams	Unknown	13 October 2014
AbracaDebra is giving magic lessons to the residents of Llan-ar-goll-en, but things start to go wrong and the magic tricks don't work.
22	"Het Radli"	Rhys D. Williams	Unknown	20 October 2014
After yet another crash with his bike, Radli's hat goes missing.
23	"Cadw'n Heini"	Rhys D. Williams	Unknown	27 October 2014
Everyone is looking forward to Mrs. Tomos T Twt's exercise class, but Enid, Mrs T's unicycle, goes missing.
24	"Bwystfil y Bont"	Rhys D. Williams	Unknown	3 November 2014
A weird howling sound in Llan-ar-goll-en frightens all the villagers, and they suspect that the scary "beast of the bridge" has arrived in the village.
25	"Parti Barti"	Rhys D. Williams	Unknown	10 November 2014
It's Barti Felyn's birthday and when Ianto has a chance to give him his present, it disappears.
26	"Gwallt Dr Jim"	Rhys D. Williams	Unknown	17 November 2014
Prys and Ceri solve the mystery of Dr Jim's missing hair.

=== Series 2 (2014–16) ===
No. overall	No. in season	Title	Directed by	Written by	Original release date
27	1	"Ceirw Coll Siôn Corn"	Rhys D. Williams	Unknown	24 December 2014
A new visitor drops by the village on Christmas Eve, Santa Claus. He needs the help of Prys and Ceri to find his lost reindeer. Note: This episode is a half-hour Christmas special.
28	2	"Dwylo Blewog"	Rhys D. Williams	Unknown	2 March 2015
Radli Migins is waiting for a parcel to help him become a rock star.
29	3	"Hufen Iâ, Na"	Rhys D. Williams	Unknown	9 March 2015
Beti makes a cake for her niece but it disappears.
30	4	"Y Stethosgop Sgleiniog"	Rhys D. Williams	Unknown	16 March 2015
Siwgrlwmp is ill so Mrs Tomos calls Mia Pia, the village vet, for help. But when Mia reaches for her stethoscope, she discovers it has gone.
31	5	"Bysedd y cwn"	Rhys D. Williams	Unknown	23 March 2015
One by one, the Llan-ar-goll-en animals are disappearing, so Prys sets out to solve this mystery without Ceri's help.
32	6	"Y Cameleon"	Rhys D. Williams	Unknown	30 March 2015
A chameleon is on the loose in Llan-ar-goll-en. It appears every now and then, but before anybody has a chance to talk to it, it disappears.
33	7	"Dirgelwch Y Llyfr Coll"	Rhys D. Williams	Unknown	6 April 2015
Dr Jim creates a new device; a book which can speak every language on earth. Unfortunately, as he travels around the village, he loses the book.
34	8	"Steil Gwerth Chweil"	Rhys D. Williams	Unknown	13 April 2015
Tara and Abracadebra challenge each other to create a stunning hairstyle for Mrs. Tomos; Tara using her hairbrush and Abracadebra using her magic wand.
35	9	"Ble Mae Ceri?"	Rhys D. Williams	Unknown	20 April 2015
Prys finds a letter from Ceri telling him she has gone away, and with the help of her cousin, Caradog, Prys is determined to find her.
36	10	"Y Fâs Flodau"	Rhys D. Williams	Unknown	27 April 2015
Llan-ar-goll-en is taking part in the "Tidiest Village in Wales" competition, and Mrs. Tomos is in charge of all the arrangements.
37	11	"Diwrnod Rhyfadd Pyfadd"	Rhys D. Williams	Unknown	4 May 2015
Some odd things happen in Llan-ar-goll-en.
38	12	"Cist O Aer"	Rhys D. Williams	Unknown	11 May 2015
Tara receives a special map from her Aunt Magw. It might possibly be a treasure map that leads to a chest full of gold and jewels.
39	13	"Clychau'n Canu"	Rhys D. Williams	Unknown	18 May 2015
Tara, Radli, Prys, Ceri, and Siwgwrlwmp rehearse a special dance for a show. However, the bells used for the dance have gone missing.
40	14	"Trwyn Coch"	Rhys D. Williams	Unknown	24 December 2015
Carwyn the reindeer's red nose disappears. Note: This episode is another Christmas special.
41	15	"Y Brwsh Gwallt Coll"	Rhys D. Williams	Unknown	4 January 2016
The villagers are rehearsing for the local talent show, but before the show begins, Prys and Ceri are called to solve the mystery of the missing hairbrush.
42	16	"Streipiau Ianto"	Rhys D. Williams	Unknown	11 January 2016
The village animals are preparing for the Annual Animal Show, and Ianto is determined to win. But before the judging can begin, Barti notices that Ianto's tail stripes have disappeared.
43	17	"Diwrnod o wyliau i Radli"	Rhys D. Williams	Unknown	18 January 2016
Somebody has stolen Mia Pia's job.
44	18	"Y Pysgodyn Aur"	Rhys D. Williams	Unknown	25 January 2016
Beti is given a goldfish by her friend Ffernando, but it goes missing.
45	19	"O Na, Mrs Tomos!"	Rhys D. Williams	Unknown	1 February 2016
Mrs. Tomos has decided to leave Llan-ar-goll-en and the villagers are broken-hearted.
46	20	"Mae Ianto ar Goll!"	Rhys D. Williams	Unknown	8 February 2016
Ianto goes missing, and Prys and Ceri wonder whether or not Dr. Jim's new device has something to do with the mystery.
47	21	"Ew am Uwd"	Rhys D. Williams	Unknown	15 February 2016
Beti's porridge has disappeared from the bakery.
48	22	"Lleidr y Lliain Llestri"	Rhys D. Williams	Unknown	22 February 2016
All the tea-towels in Llan-ar-goll-en are stolen, so Prys and Ceri set out to find who is responsible.
49	23	"Y Camera Hunlun Hynod"	Rhys D. Williams	Unknown	29 February 2016
Dr. Jim invents a camera that takes selfies.
50	24	"Lle aeth y Syrcas?"	Rhys D. Williams	Unknown	7 March 2016
Radli Migins has heard that there is a circus in Llan-ar-goll-en, but when he goes to look for it, he cannot find it anywhere.
51	25	"Y Bowlen Grisial"	Rhys D. Williams	Unknown	14 March 2016
The Mayoress is about to unveil a very special crystal bowl in the Village Hall when she notices it has disappeared.

== Accolades ==
In 2015, Llan-ar-goll-en was nominated in the British Academy Cymru Awards for Children's Programme. It was beaten by #Fi (Boom Plant, S4C).

== Merchandise ==
Interactive apps and e-books were created for Llan-ar-goll-en by Cloth Cat's sister company, Thud Media. They were made available on the iTunes Appstore and Google Play.
