= Death Valley (British TV series) =

British television series

- Genre: Cosy mystery; Detective fiction; Comedy drama
- Created by: Paul Doolan
- Directed by: Simon Hynd
- Starring: Timothy Spall; Gwyneth Keyworth
- Music by: Sion Trefor
- Country of origin: United Kingdom
- Original languages: English, Welsh
- No. of series: 2
- No. of episodes: 12

Production
- Executive producers: Madeline Addy; Paul Doolan; Josh Cole; Timothy Spall
- Producer: Nikki Wilson
- Running time: 45 minutes
- Production company: BBC Studios

Original release
- Network: BBC One
- Release: 25 May 2025 – present

Death Valley is a crime mystery television series starring Timothy Spall and Gwyneth Keyworth, which was first broadcast on 25 May 2025 on BBC One. In August 2025, it was renewed for a second series, which began on 17 May 2026.

== Premise ==
Set in Mid Wales (although filmed in the Vale of Glamorgan), the murder mystery series follows the unlikely crime-solving partnership between eccentric national treasure John Chapel, a retired actor and star of hit long-running detective television show Caesar, and socially inept Detective Sergeant Janie Mallowan.

== Cast and characters ==
=== Main ===
- Timothy Spall as John Chapel
- Gwyneth Keyworth as DS/DI Jane "Janie" Mallowan
- Steffan Rhodri as DCI Barry Clarke
- Alexandria Riley as Helen Baxter
- Rithvik Andugula as DC Evan Chaudhry

=== Guest ===
- Jim Howick as Constable Atkins (Series 1) and as Randall St Clair (Series 2)
- Melanie Walters as Yvonne Mallowan
- Patricia Hodge as Helena
- Remy Beasley as Rhiannon Hopkins
- Mike Bubbins as Desk Sergeant Tony (Series 1) renamed as Cliff Rickard for Series 2
- Sian Gibson as Wendy
- Amy Morgan as Sioned
- Steve Speirs as Lloyd
- Eryn Kelleher as Ava
- Nathan Foad as Owen
- Charlotte O'Leary as Izzy Eldwick
- Craig Gallivan as Dean Ward
- Jane Horrocks as Polly Trevor (Series 2)
- Alexandra Roach as Angela Vaughan (Series 2)
- Hammed Animashaun as Warren Medwin (Series 2)
- Roisin Conaty as Karen Hughes (Series 2)
- Mark Lewis Jones as Gareth Merwin (Series 2)
- Camille Coduri as Dawn Apsted (Series 2)
- Leisa Gwenllian as Olivia Whitmore (Series 2)
- Amit Shah as Ashwin Shaw (Series 2)
- Owen Teale as Michael Mallowan (Series 2)
- Rhiannon Clements as Minerva Maddox (Series 2)
- Asim Chaudhry as Omar Sahni (Series 2)
- Tori Allen-Martin as Amanda Sahni (Series 2)
- Liz Carr as Fiona Challoner (Series 2)
- Robert Wilfort as Owen Skinner (Series 2)
- Charles Dale as Terry Daniels (Series 2)

== Production ==
The six-part first series was written and created by Paul Doolan. Timothy Spall and Gwyneth Keyworth were cast in the lead roles in May 2024. Also in the cast are Steffan Rhodri, Alexandria Riley and Melanie Walters. Guest stars include Kiell Smith-Bynoe, Sian Gibson, Patricia Hodge and Jim Howick.

According to Doolan, detective Janie Mallowan takes her name from Agatha Christie's married name, Mallowan, and from Christie's character Jane Marple.

Filming took place in June 2024 in Penarth, particularly Penarth Conservative Club and Penarth Pier, and in Llantwit Major in the Vale of Glamorgan, including St Illtyd's Church there. Filming on the second series took place in Penarth in 2025. Guests stars on the second series include Jane Horrocks, Mark Lewis Jones, Alexandra Roach, Hammed Animashaun, Roisin Conaty, Asim Chaudhry and Mike Bubbins.

== Broadcast ==
The first series premiered on 25 May 2025 on BBC One and BBC iPlayer.

The second series premiered on 17 May 2026 on BBC One and BBC iPlayer.

== Episodes ==
=== Series overview ===
Series	Episodes	Originally released	
Series	Episodes	First released	Last released
1	6	25 May 2025	29 June 2025
2	6	17 May 2026	21 June 2026

=== Series 1 (2025) ===
No.	Episode	Directed by	Written by	Original release date	UK viewers (millions)
1	Episode 1	Simon Hynd	Paul Doolan	25 May 2025	4.51
DS Jane (Janie) Mallowan investigates the apparent suicide of a property developer. She discovers that former TV detective and national treasure John Chapel is one of the dead man's neighbours. Chapel provides insight into the motivations of the dead man and various suspects.
2	Episode 2	Simon Hynd	Paul Doolan	1 June 2025	4.09
A new member of Janie's mother Yvonne's hillwalking group is found dead near a notorious danger spot at a waterfall. John joins the group to learn more about the dead woman and the members of the group.
3	Episode 3	Simon Hynd	Paul Doolan and Nina Metivier	8 June 2025	4.04
The best man is killed the night before a wedding. John looks into the psychology of the wedding party members.
4	Episode 4	Simon Hynd	Paul Doolan	15 June 2025	3.49
When the director of an am-dram production of Hamlet is found murdered, John joins the production to investigate, despite reservations about a return to acting.
5	Episode 5	Simon Hynd	Paul Doolan	22 June 2025	3.58
Actor Anthony Hart, the star of the detective series Phoenix and John's professional rival, is stabbed to death during a murder mystery event hosted at his own country house. Aiding Janie's investigation, John reconnects with the deceased's sister and his former flame, Helena.
6	Episode 6	Simon Hynd	Paul Doolan	29 June 2025	3.28
Janie has lost her promotion because her working relationship with Chapel has been splashed across social media. At his secondary school 15 year reunion, Janie's mechanic is killed. A body in a drain has been identified as that of a long-missing Dutch backpacker. At the Chief Superintendent's insistence, DCI Clarke takes on Chapel as a criminal psychologist consultant to help with both murders. Janie deduces that Chapel has a girlfriend, but is shocked to discover who it is.

=== Series 2 (2026) ===
No.	Episode	Directed by	Written by	Original release date	BBC One broadcast	UK viewers (millions)
7	Episode 1	Simon Hynd	Paul Doolan	17 May 2026	17 May 2026	3.52
Janie, now Detective Inspector, finds it difficult to deal with John being in a relationship with her mother Yvonne. The death of a man performing community service at a castle leads to John being asked to join the group, initially against Janie’s wishes. Together they determine the motivations of the culprit.
8	Episode 2	Simon Hynd	Paul Doolan and Ian Jarvis	17 May 2026	24 May 2026	2.94
Janie investigates the arson of a popular fish-and-chip stall and the death of its hipster proprietor. After being dumped by Yvonne, a heartbroken John visits the seaside town where the murder took place.
9	Episode 3	Claire Winyard	Paul Doolan and Sian Harries	17 May 2026	31 May 2026	N/A
After a runner is found fatally overdosed on the set of a fantasy series, Janie befriends the series' leading actress and John is reacquainted with Randall St Clair, his former co-star on Caesar who played his sidekick Constable Atkins.
10	Episode 4	Claire Winyard	Nina Metivier	17 May 2026	7 June 2026	N/A
When the leader of a self-sufficient commune is found murdered, Janie is reluctantly reunited with her absent father Michael and is bemused when John befriends him.
11	Episode 5	Simon Hynd	Paul Doolan	17 May 2026	14 June 2026	N/A
During a compliance training day presented by Janie at the police station, one of the attendees is found murdered. With the station locked down and the suspects not permitted to leave until further notice, one "old school" officer is considered the prime suspect. Meanwhile, Janie's dad offers her the chance to spend a year in Portugal with him while John considers reviving his acting career but is affronted at having to submit an audition tape.
12	Episode 6	Simon Hynd	Paul Doolan	17 May 2026	21 June 2026	N/A
During Janie's final week before leaving for Portugal, the chairwoman of the local rugby club is found murdered during the funeral of a club staff member. Still waiting to hear back about his audition tape, John decides to investigate the club by hosting a Caesar Q&A evening there.

== Reception ==
Lucy Mangan of The Guardian declared the first series a quality cosy mystery series, calling it "witty and fun". In The Daily Telegraph Benji Wilson gave the opening episode four stars out of five; "Timothy Spall’s witty sleuth proves a rival for Ludwig". On the other hand, Phil Harrison in The Independent wrote: "It would drift away on the faintest breeze. There are undoubtedly less pleasant ways to spend a Sunday evening in front of the television. But this is less cosy crime, more comatose crime."

Harrison, writing in the The Guardian, was more supportive of the second series: "The second series of this cheery Welsh cosy crime is as gentle as a pillow – and if it feels dangerously close to a spoof, that’s all part of the fun ... Its body count challenges that of The Sopranos, but in its soothing episodic rhythms and Welsh valley quaintness, it remains as comfortable and predictable as Christmas".
