= Steffan Rhodri =

Welsh actor

- Born: 1967 (age 58–59); Wales
- Occupation: Actor
- Years active: 1995–present
- Notable work: Gavin & Stacey; Harry Potter and the Deathly Hallows – Part 1 Ni no Kuni: Wrath of the White Witch

Steffan Rhodri (born 1967) is a Welsh film and television actor, best known for portraying bus driver Dave Coaches in the BBC comedy series Gavin & Stacey.

== Early and personal life ==
Steffan Rhodri was born in 1967 and grew up in Morriston, Swansea. He is the cousin of novelist Mark Ellis.

He is well known as a fan of Swansea City F.C., for whom he made a DVD called The Golden Year.

== Career ==
Rhodri has appeared in both English-language and Welsh-language films, television and stage productions. He played Reg Cattermole in Harry Potter and the Deathly Hallows – Part 1 and provided the voice of Drippy in Ni no Kuni: Wrath of the White Witch. He has been called "Wales' most prolific actor".

On stage, he played Banquo alongside Ralph Fiennes in Simon Godwin's production of Macbeth.

Rhodri is best known for portraying bus driver Dave Coaches in the comedy series Gavin & Stacey.

=== Filmography ===
- Twin Town (1997) – Hunky
- Solomon and Gaenor (1999) – Noah Jones
- Ali G Indahouse (2002) – School Teacher
- Cymru Fach (2008)
- The Big I Am (2010) – DS Moseley
- Submarine (2010) – Mr. Davey
- Harry Potter and the Deathly Hallows: Part 1 (2010) – Reg Cattermole
- Ironclad (2011) – Cooper
- Under Milk Wood (2015) – Mog Edwards
- Wonder Woman (2017) – Colonel Darnell
- Last Summer (2018) – Sgt Morgan
- Don't Breathe 2 (2021) – The Surgeon / Dr. Thomas Hanniman
- The Last Kingdom: Seven Kings Must Die (2023) – Hywel Dda
- Mr Burton (2025) – Dic Jenkins

=== Television ===
- Pobol y Cwm (1995–1996, 1998, BBC) – Jon Markham
- A Mind to Kill (1997, S4C/Channel 5) – Young Sir Isaac Gwillym
- Tales from Pleasure Beach (2001, BBC) – Wes
- Con Passionate (2005, S4C) – Andy
- Wire in the Blood (2005, ITV) – Bill Denton
- Heartbeat (2007, ITV) – Frank Jepson
- Belonging (2008) – Ed
- Giles Wemmbley Hogg Goes Off.... to Glastonbury (2007, TV movie)
- Gavin & Stacey (2007–2010, 2024, BBC) – Dave Coaches
- Doctors (2010, BBC) – Gerry Cutler
- Pen Talar (2010, S4C) – Phillip Harrison
- Teulu (2010)
- 4Music (2011–present, Channel 4) – Narrator
- Father Brown (2013, BBC) – Christy Nolan
- Hinterland (2013, S4C/BBC) – Herbert Rees
- Under Milk Wood (2014, BBC) – Mr. Waldo
- A Touch of Cloth (2014, SKY) – Eddie Huffway
- Cara Fi (2014) – Vic Reed
- Cucumber (2015, Channel 4) – Don Baxter
- The Hollow Crown (2016, BBC) – Oxford
- Apple Tree Yard (2017, BBC) – DI Cleveland
- Shorts: The Pines (2017, by Gary Owen) (starring Steffan Rhodri)
- Three Girls (2017, BBC) – Fraser Lavery
- Keeping Faith (2017–2019, BBC) – Judge Gwyn Daniels
- A Very English Scandal (2018, BBC) – DCS Michael Challes
- Manhunt (2019, ITV) – DC Neil Jones
- Temple (2019, SKY) – Jeremy
- Wild Bill (2019, ITV) – DS Alex Blair
- The Last Kingdom (2020, Netflix) – King Hywel
- We Hunt Together (2020, Alibi) – Larry
- In My Skin (2021, BBC) – Perry
- Yr Amgueddfa (2021, S4C) – Alun Howells
- House of the Dragon (2022) – Hobert Hightower (3 episodes)
- Steeltown Murders (2023) – DCI Bach Rees
- Men Up (2023) – Colin White
- Das Boot (2023) – Admiral Kenton
- The Way (2024) – Geoff Driscoll
- Death Valley (2025) – DCI Barry Clarke
- The Guest (2025) - Nick
- Death in Paradise (2026) - George McCann

=== Theatre ===
- Abigail's Party by Mike Leigh – Hampstead Theatre, London, 2002–2003
- The Birthday Party – Clwyd Theatr Cymru, 2006
- The Father – Chichester, 2006
- Great Expectations – Clwyd Theatr Cymru, 2009
- Mary Stuart – Clwyd Theatr Cymru, 2009
- Clybourne Park by Bruce Norris – Royal Court Theatre, London, 2010
- The Kitchen Sink by Tom Wells – Bush Theatre, 2011
- Absent Friends by Alan Ayckborn – West End, 2012
- Posh by Laura Wade – West End, 2012
- It's a Mad World My Masters – Royal Shakespeare Company, 2013
- Candide by Mark Ravenhill – Royal Shakespeare Company, 2013
- I'd Rather Goya Robbed Me of My Sleep Than Some Other Arsehole by Federico Garcia – Gate Theatre, 2014
- The Mentalists by Richard Bean – West End, 2015
- The Hairy Ape by Eugene O'Neill – The Old Vic, 2015
- Walter Harrison in This House by James Graham – Garrick Theatre, 2016–2017
- Killer Joe by Tracy Letts – Trafalgar Studios, 2018
- Banquo in Macbeth by William Shakespeare – 2023-24

=== Video games ===
- Ni no Kuni: Wrath of the White Witch (2013) – Drippy (voice)

=== Audio drama ===
He also guest-starred in a number of Doctor Who spin-off audio plays produced by Big Finish Productions. These include Dreamtime, The Bone of Contention and as the British Prime Minister in UNIT: The Longest Night and UNIT: The Wasting.
