= Melanie Walters =

Welsh actress (born 1962)

- Born: Elizabeth Melanie Walters; 30 January 1962 (age 64); Swansea, Wales
- Occupation: Actress
- Years active: 1986–present
- Children: 1

Elizabeth Melanie Walters (born 30 January 1962) is a Welsh actress, known for portraying the role of Gwen West in the BBC sitcom Gavin & Stacey (2007–2010, 2019, 2024). With a career spanning five decades, her other roles have included Helen Powell in We Are Seven (1989–1991), Bonnie Bevan in Hollyoaks (2007–2009) and Yvonne Mallowan in the BBC crime mystery series Death Valley (2025–2026). She has also appeared in various stage productions and pantomimes, and in 2026 became a contestant on the twenty-fourth series of Strictly Come Dancing.

== Early life ==
Elizabeth Melanie Walters was born on 30 January 1962, the youngest of four children born to David Walters and Margaret (née Warnes), and was raised in the Mumbles, near Swansea. She has an older brother David, and two older sisters Eleri and Julia. Their father died when Walters was young, leaving their mother to raise four children under four years old. In 1973, aged 11, she took over her brother's paper round, covering Mumbles Head every day, an experience she described at length on BBC Radio 4 in January 2012. When she was 14 she qualified as a lifeguard, working on the local beaches.

== Career ==
Walters began her acting career in the late 1980's. Her first credited role was as Milwen Parry in two episodes of the BBC series The District Nurse in 1987. She went on to appear in episodes of Screen Two, Mistress of Suspense and Coronation Street. Between 1989 and 1991, she portrayed Helen Powell in the BBC drama series We Are Seven. Between 2000 and 2001, she appeared in the BBC One Wales series Belonging as Delyth. She has also made various guest appearances in television shows including The Bill, Dangerfield, Casualty and Holby City.

Walters' most known role came in 2007, when she began playing Gwen West, the widowed mother of title character Stacey Shipman (née West) known for her frequent making of omelettes, in the BBC sitcom Gavin & Stacey, a role she held until 2010, before returning for Christmas special episodes in 2019 and 2024 respectively. Between 2007 and 2009, she sporadically portrayed the role of Bonnie Bevan in the Channel 4 soap opera Hollyoaks. Walters was one of eight celebrities chosen to participate in an intense week learning Welsh in an eco-friendly chic campsite in Pembrokeshire in the series cariad@iaith:love4language shown on S4C in July 2011, and emerged winner of the series.

Walters has appeared in various stage productions and pantomimes, including Educating Rita, Blue Remembered Hills, Snow White and the Seven Dwarfs, The Importance of Being Earnest, Sleeping Beauty, Beauty and the Beast and numerous productions of Cinderella.

Since 2025, she has appeared in the BBC crime mystery series Death Valley as Yvonne Mallowan. In 2026, she appeared in an episode of Beyond Paradise. In September 2026, Walters was a contestant on the twenty-fourth series of Strictly Come Dancing and was partnered with professional dancer Aljaž Škorjanec.

== Personal life ==
Walters lives with her son in the Mumbles, Swansea, where she also runs a business teaching Pilates.

== Filmography ==
=== Film ===
| Year | Title | Role |
|---|---|---|
| 1995 | Tan ar y Comin | Mrs. Evans |
| 2010 | Submarine | Judie Bevan |
| 2011 | Resistance | Helen Roberts |
| 2013 | Another Me | Mrs MacPhail |
| 2014 | Ex Libris | Iris |
| 2015 | High Tide | Bethan |
| 2015 | Caring for the Recently Deceased | Alice |
| 2015 | Slim Chance | Meg |
| 2015 | Burn Burn Burn | Shelle |
| 2017 | The Dead Dog | Emily |
| 2017 | Cold Comfort | Martha |
| 2018 | Say My Name | Aurelie Strohfeldt |
| 2021 | Heart of Steel | Helen |
| 2021 | La Cha Cha | Iris |
| 2022 | Save the Cinema | Mrs. Pritchard |
| 2025 | Croydon Cowgirl | Nova |

=== Television ===
| Year | Title | Role | Notes |
|---|---|---|---|
| 1987 | The District Nurse | Milwen Parry | 2 episodes |
| 1988 | Screen Two | Sian | Episode: "Run for the Lifeboat" |
| 1989 | Ballroom | Ann | Television film |
| 1989–1991 | We are Seven | Helen Powell | Series regular |
| 1991 | Coronation Street | Valerie Jennings | 1 episode |
| 1992 | Friday on My Mind | Dr. Carr | 1 episode |
| 1993 | Telltale | Jean Herbert | 3 episodes |
| 1993 | Screen One | Sister Ann Munroe | Episode: "Tender Loving Care" |
| 1994 | Christmas Reunion | Mrs Evans | Television film |
| 1994 | The Healer | Gill Major | Television film |
| 1995 | The Bill | Ellen Reynolds | Episode: "Little Boy Lost" |
| 1995 | Killing Me Softly | Amy | Television film |
| 1996 | Dangerfield | Beverley Groves | Episode: "Still Waters" |
| 1997 | Backup | Sally Vaughan | Episode: "Partners" |
| 1997 | A Mind to Kill | Ruth Barra | Episode: "Inheritance" |
| 1999 | Jack of Hearts | Silvie | 2 episodes |
| 1999 | Casualty | Bev Lewis | Episode: "To Have and To Hold" |
| 2000 | Dirty Work | Megan | Episode: "Naked Ambition" |
| 2000–2001 | Belonging | Delyth | Regular role |
| 2002 | Holby City | Melanie Hooper | Episode: "Choose Life" |
| 2003 | Stopping Distance | Lisa's mother | Television film |
| 2007–2010, 2019, 2024 | Gavin & Stacey | Gwen West | Regular role |
| 2007 | Rob Brydon's Annually Retentive | Herself | Guest appearance |
| 2007–2009 | Hollyoaks | Bonnie Bevan | Recurring role |
| 2011 | Being Human | Emma | 2 episodes |
| 2011 | Cariad@iaith:love4language | Herself | Winner |
| 2013 | Stella | Midwife | 1 episode |
| 2014 | Under Milk Wood | Neighbour | 1 episode |
| 2015 | Doc Martin | Heather Merchant | Episode: "The Shock of the New" |
| 2016 | The Collection | Genevieve | Regular role |
| 2017 | The Watcher in the Woods | Helen Taylor | Television film |
| 2018 | Casualty | Carrie Gillespie | 1 episode |
| 2018 | Morfydd | Joan Riviere | Television film |
| 2019 | Pitching In | Kitty | 4 episodes |
| 2020 | The Snow Spider | Nain Griffiths | 5 episodes |
| 2020 | My Petasaurus | Nanna | Episode: "A Big Surprise" |
| 2021–2022 | Biff & Chip | Gran | Regular role |
| 2023 | Jerk | Beatrice | 1 episode |
| 2024 | Father Brown | Dotty Finglesham | Episode: "The Hermit of Hazelnut Cottage" |
| 2025–2026 | Death Valley | Yvonne Mallowan | Regular role |
| 2026 | Beyond Paradise | Geraldine Desai | 1 episode |
| 2026 | Strictly Come Dancing | Herself | Contestant; series 24 |

=== Stage ===
| Year | Title | Role | Venue | Ref. |
|---|---|---|---|---|
| 1992 | Educating Rita | Rita | Swansea Grand Theatre | |
| 1998 | Blue Remembered Hills | Angela | Theatr Clwyd | |
| 2010–2011 | Snow White and the Seven Dwarfs | Wicked Queen | Swansea Grand Theatre | |
| 2011–2012 | Cinderella | Fairy Godmother | Riverfront Arts Centre, Newport | |
| 2012 | Sleeping Beauty | Good Fairy | Pavilion Theatre, Rhyl | |
| 2014–2015 | Cinderella | Fairy Godmother | Theatre Royal, Bath | |
| 2015 | Jack and the Beanstalk | Forest Fairy | The Anvil, Basingstoke | |
| 2015 | The Iliad | As Cast | National Theatre Wales | |
| 2016 | Cinderella | Fairy Godmother | Pavilion Theatre, Bournemouth | |
| 2016 | Before I Leave | Dyanne | National Theatre Wales | |
| 2017 | Cinderella | Fairy Godmother | Blackpool Grand Theatre | |
| 2017 | The Importance of Being Earnest | Miss Prism | Theatr Clwyd | |
| 2021 | What's New Pussycat? | Mrs Western | Birmingham Repertory Theatre | |
| 2021–2022 | Beauty and the Beast | Fairy Bon Bon | Floral Pavilion Theatre | |
| 2024 | Beauty and the Beast | Fairy Camembert | The Playhouse, Weston-super-Mare | |
| 2025–2026 | Cinderella | Fairy Godmother | Pavilion Theatre, Bournemouth | |
