= The Witch Farm =

British television series

- Genre: Supernatural
- Created by: Danny Robins
- Screenplay by: Danny Robins
- Directed by: Stacey Gregg
- Starring: Gabrielle Creevy; Michael Socha
- Composer: Adam Janota Bzowski
- Country of origin: United Kingdom
- Original language: English
- No. of series: 1
- No. of episodes: 4

Production
- Executive producers: James Gandhi; Damien Timmer; Nawfal Faizullah; Rebecca Ferguson; Stacey Gregg; Danny Robins; Nick Andrews
- Producer: Megan Ott
- Running time: 57 minutes
- Production company: Mammoth Screen

Original release
- Network: BBC One
- Release: 22 November – 30 November 2026

The Witch Farm is a British supernatural television miniseries created by Danny Robins. The series stars Gabrielle Creevy and Michael Socha and is set to premiere on BBC One on 22 November 2026.

== Premise ==
A couple who have left London for a new life in South Wales in 1989 become fearful that their farmhouse is haunted.

== Cast and characters ==
- Gabrielle Creevy as Liz
- Michael Socha as Bill
- Lewin Lloyd as Jonathan
- Jeremy Swift as Eddie Burks
- Sian Gibson as Bethan
- Robert Pugh
- Edward Holcroft as Max Harriman
- Roger Evans

== Production ==
The series is inspired by the Danny Robins podcast of the same name for BBC Radio 4, which revolved around real-life events that took place in the late 1980s and 1990s in the Brecon Beacons. The four-part series was announced as a BBC One commission in April 2026, and is written and created by Robbins. Stacey Gregg serves as the director and Megan Ott as the producer. James Gandhi and Damien Timmer are executive producers for Mammoth Screen, and Nawfal Faizullah and Rebecca Ferguson for the BBC.

The cast is led by Gabrielle Creevy and Michael Socha as the married couple at the heart of the story, with Lewin Lloyd as their son. The cast also includes Sian Gibson, Jeremy Swift, Robert Pugh, Roger Evans and Edward Holcroft. First-look images from filming were released in August 2026. Filming took place in the spring of 2026 in Swansea, with locations used including Swansea Museum as well as Swansea Guildhall and Civic Centre.

== Broadcast ==
The Witch Farm is due to premiere on BBC One on 22 November 2026, with all episodes also releasing on BBC iPlayer.
