= The Pembrokeshire Murders =

British television series

- Genre: Crime drama Thriller
- Based on: The Pembrokeshire Murders: Catching the Bullseye Killer by Steve Wilkins
- Written by: Nick Stevens
- Directed by: Marc Evans
- Starring: Luke Evans; Keith Allen; Caroline Berry; Alexandria Riley
- Theme music composer: Carly Paradis
- Composer: Carly Paradis
- Country of origin: United Kingdom
- Original language: English
- No. of series: 1
- No. of episodes: 3

Production
- Executive producers: Simon Heath; Jonathan Hill; Nick Stevens
- Producer: Ed Talfan
- Production companies: World Productions; ITV Studios

Original release
- Network: ITV
- Release: 11 January – 13 January 2021

The Pembrokeshire Murders is a British three-part television drama based on the Pembrokeshire murders by Welsh serial killer John Cooper. It premiered on ITV on 11 January 2021.

== Synopsis ==
In 2006, newly promoted Detective Superintendent Steve Wilkins decided to reopen two unsolved 1980s murder cases linked with a string of burglaries. New advances in technology for forensic DNA analysis, witness reports and artists impressions of the suspect led to Dyfed-Powys Police reviewing a 1989 episode of Bullseye, which led to the serial killer finally being caught.

== Cast ==
- Luke Evans as Detective Superintendent Steve Wilkins
- Keith Allen as serial killer John Cooper
- Caroline Berry as Pat Cooper, John Cooper's wife
- David Fynn as Jonathan Hill
- Oliver Ryan as Andrew Cooper
- Alexandria Riley as Detective Inspector Ella Richards
- Charles Dale as Detective Sergeant Gareth Rees
- Steven Meo as Detective Inspector Lynne Harries
- Richard Corgan as Detective Sergeant Glyn Johnson
- Kyle Lima as Detective Constable Nigel Rowe
- Steffan Cennydd as Jack Wilkins
- Anastasia Hille as Dr Angela Gallop
- Roger Evans as Detective Chief Inspector Jim Morris
- William Thomas as Detective Chief Inspector George Jones
- Suzanne Packer as Chief Constable Tyler
- Sarah Jane as Police officer
- Owen Teale as Gerard Elias QC
- Ian Saynor as Mr Justice Griffith Williams
- Rhodri Evan as Detective Chief Superintendent Coles
- Simon Nehan as Craig

== Production ==
=== Development and casting ===
In January 2020, production began on The Pembrokeshire Murders. The series stars Luke Evans of The Great Train Robbery as Detective Superintendent Steve Wilkins, and Keith Allen as John Cooper, serial killer. The drama is the thirteenth in a series of ITV series featuring notorious British murder cases of the past two centuries, following on from This Is Personal: The Hunt for the Yorkshire Ripper (2000), Shipman (2002), A Is for Acid (2002), The Brides in the Bath (2003), See No Evil: The Moors Murders (2006), Appropriate Adult (2011), Dark Angel, In Plain Sight (both 2016), Little Boy Blue (2017), Manhunt (2019), White House Farm, and Des (both in 2020).

=== Filming ===
Filming wrapped just before Wales's first lockdown during the COVID-19 pandemic. Most exterior scenes were shot on location in Pembrokeshire.

== Release ==
It was first shown on Belgium's Dutch-speaking broadcaster Eén from 29 January to 12 February 2021. In the US and Canada, the series premiered on BritBox.

== Episodes ==
No.	Title	Directed by	Written by	Original release date	U.K. viewers (millions)
1	"Episode One"	Marc Evans	Nick Stevens	11 January 2021	10.94
DSU Steve Wilkins re-opens one of Wales's most notorious unsolved crimes, known locally as the Coastal Path Murders.
2	"Episode Two"	Marc Evans	Nick Stevens	12 January 2021	10.29
The investigation into the Coastal Path Murders continues, but with no conclusive results from scientific testing, DSU Wilkins and his team must tackle the chief suspect, John Cooper, head-on for three days of interviews.
3	"Episode Three"	Marc Evans	Nick Stevens	13 January 2021	10.64
A long awaited scientific breakthrough gives DSU Steve Wilkins and his team their vital ammunition in the case against John Cooper.

== Critical reception ==
Rebecca Nicholson, reviewing in The Guardian, described the drama as "no glory for violent, rotten crimes" and gave it four stars, while Carol Midgley for The Times described the show as "a case of too much cop and not enough killer" and gave it three stars. Ed Cummings from The Independent criticised the programme for following dramatic clichés and poor script-writing, awarding two stars.
