= Steve Speirs =

Welsh actor and writer

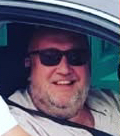
- Speirs in 2020
- Born: Steven Roberts; 22 February 1965 (age 61); Troed-y-rhiw, Glamorgan, Wales
- Occupations: Actor; writer
- Years active: 1989–present

Steve Speirs (born Steven Roberts; 22 February 1965) is a Welsh actor and writer who has appeared in films such as Star Wars: Episode I – The Phantom Menace and Pirates of the Caribbean: Dead Man's Chest.

== Early life ==
He was born as Steven Roberts in Troed-y-rhiw, a village now in the borough of Merthyr Tydfil, Wales, and went to school at Afon Taf High School where he found a taste for drama. He joined the National Youth Theatre of Wales and studied drama at Loughborough University. He says he took his stage name, Speirs, from the surname of a lecturer at college.

== Career ==
Since graduating from university, Speirs has played Sloan in Eragon, Andy Fellows in Making Waves and with Ricky Gervais in Extras, as well as playing Captain Tarpals in Star Wars: Episode I – The Phantom Menace and having a small role in Pirates of the Caribbean: Dead Man's Chest.

He appears in Kröd Mändoon and the Flaming Sword of Fire, a comedy fantasy series in which he plays Loquasto, an oafish servant, "who belongs to a race of pig-like creatures known as Grobble".

He wrote his first film, Caught in the Act, in 2008 and starred in it as the lead character. Based on his memories of growing up in south Wales, it was filmed in the Merthyr Tydfil area.

Speirs also appeared in the Gervais and Stephen Merchant film Cemetery Junction released in 2010, a part which was written particularly for him. Speirs also appeared as the bouncer at Mother McOakley's Tavern in Burke and Hare, a British black comedy directed by John Landis and released (in the United Kingdom) in October 2010. He also starred in a CBBC show called Sadie J where he portrayed Sadie's dad, a mechanic. Other roles which Speirs is known for include his portrayal of Bernard Bresslaw in Cor, Blimey!, Big Alan Williams in Stella and Colour Sergeant Wormwood in Sharpe's Peril. He also appears as a postman on the last episode of Miranda season 3. Speirs played depressed geography teacher and caretaker Mr Gareth Barber in the BBC One sitcom Big School for two series in 2013 and 2014.

In 2013, Spiers played PC McClintock in the Christmas TV film Gangsta Granny, an adaptation of the book written by David Walliams. He played the role of Dad in the 2014 TV film The Boy in the Dress, also written by Walliams.

In 2015, he appeared in the TV spin off The Bad Education Movie playing Don alongside the main cast of Bad Education as well as many other guests in the movie. The same year, he also appeared in the pilot of the radio sitcom Ankle Tag, which went on to air three series in 2017, 2018 and 2020.

In 2016, he appeared in Ben Elton's BBC One comedy series Upstart Crow playing Richard Burbage, the actor and leader of Will's acting company. He has continued in this role for three series (2016, 2017 and 2018) with two Christmas spin-offs in 2017 and 2018 and in the London West End in Elton's stage version of the show titled The Upstart Crow.

He has created, written and starred in The Tuckers for BBC Wales and BBC iPlayer.

In 1998, he appeared in the video for the Super Furry Animals song Ice Hockey Hair.

== Personal life ==
Speirs lived in Brighton, East Sussex, but now resides in Rhiwbina, Cardiff, South Wales. He has two sons, Jack and Lewes, with his first wife. With his second wife Joanna, he has a son and a daughter. His brother is opera singer Jeffrey Lloyd Roberts.

== Filmography ==
=== Film ===
Year	Title	Role
1996	Rough Justice	DC
1997	House of America	The Head
1998	Martha, Meet Frank, Daniel and Laurence	Taxi Driver
1999	Star Wars: Episode I – The Phantom Menace	Captain Tarpals
1999	Topsy-Turvy	Mr. Kent
2000	Rancid Aluminum	BMW Man
2000	Married 2 Malcolm	Sam Tex
2001	The Musketeer	Porthos
2003	Vacuums	Tinker
2004	The Baby Juice Express	Mystery Man
2006	The Last Drop	Gustav Hansfeldt
2006	Pirates of the Caribbean: Dead Man's Chest	Quartermaster – Edinburgh
2006	Eragon	Sloan
2007	The Baker	Bryn
2007	Octane	Social worker
2008	Caught in the Act	Eric Jenkins
2008	Inkheart	Flatnose
2010	Cemetery Junction	Sgt. Wyn Davies
2010	Burke and Hare	McMartin's Doorman
2011	Hunky Dory	Mr. Cafferty
2014	Set Fire to the Stars	Mickey
2015	The Bad Education Movie	Don
2020	Denmark	Harry the Horse

=== Television ===
Year	Title	Role	Notes
1989	We Are Seven	Albert Thomas	7 episodes
1993	Screen One	Porter	Episode: "Tender Loving Care"
1995	Goodnight Sweetheart	Phil	Episode: "Nice Work If You Can Get It"
1996	The Detectives	Bruce	Episode: "Fur Coat, No Knickers"
1996	Dalziel and Pascoe	Arthur Evans	Episode: "A Clubbable Woman"
1996	Murder Most Horrid	DI Hooper	Episode: "A Life or Death Operation"
1996	Cold Lazarus	Blinda's Apartment Guard	
1998	Keeping Mum	Leonard	Episode "The Card Game"
1998	The Wonderful World of Disney	Chief Armorer	Television film: "A Knight in Camelot"
1999	The Bill	Oliver Beauman	Episode: "Pillow Talk"
2000	Cor, Blimey!	Bernard Bresslaw	Television film
2000	The Scarlet Pimpernel	Sergeant Bibot	Episode: "Ennui"
2000	Holby City	Jim Ellison	Episode: "The Real Thing"
2002	NCS: Manhunt	Benny Luck	Episodes: "Out of Time" (Parts 1 & 2)
2003	The Planman	Darren Westcoate	Television film
2003	Absolute Power	Dave Pine	Episode: "Pope Idol"
2004	Jonathan Creek	Herbie Bryant	Episode: "The Chequered Box"
2004	The Last Detective	Caradoc	Episode: "Benefit to Mankind"
2004	Making Waves	CCMEA Andy Fellows	2 episodes
2004	Tunnel of Love	Kimberley's Dad	Television film
2005	The Bill	Barry	Episode: "289a"
2005	Midsomer Murders	Keith Carter	Episode: "Sauce for the Goose"
2005	Doctor Who	Strickland	Episode: "Aliens of London/World War Three"
2005	Icon	Viktor Akopov	Television film
2005	Extras	Dullard	Episode: "Samuel L Jackson"
2006	Doctors	Pete Machin	Episode: "Strictly Bedroom"
2006	Holby City	Richard Price-Thomas	Episode: "Before a Fall"
2007	New Tricks	Dougie Taylor	Episode: "God's Waiting Room"
2008	City of Vice	William Pentlow	5 episodes
2008–09	No Heroics	Norse Dave	6 episodes
2008	Sharpe's Peril	Wormwood	Television film
2009	The Courageous Heart of Irena Sendler	Piotr	Television film
2009	Kröd Mändoon and the Flaming Sword of Fire	Loquasto	6 episodes
2009	A Child's Christmases in Wales	Uncle Huw	Television film
2010	Casualty	Stewart Kerr	Episode: "Russian Endings"
2010	Doctors	Dave Howells	Episode: "Boyo"
2010	Miranda	Ray	Episode: "The Perfect Christmas"
2011–13	Sadie J	Steve Jenkins	26 episodes
2011	Benidorm	Uri	
2012–15	Stella	Alan (Big Alan)	39 episodes
2012	A Young Doctor's Notebook & Other Stories	Syphilitic Mikhail	
2013–14	Big School	Mr. Barber	12 episodes
2013	Gangsta Granny	PC McClintock	Television film
2014	The Boy in the Dress	Peter	Television film
2016	Dickensian	Inspector Thompson	
2016	Cuckoo	Barman	Episode: "The Holiday"
2016	Rovers	Tel	6 episodes
2016–2020	Upstart Crow	Richard Burbage	19 episodes
2017	Not Going Out	Johnny Lucas	Episode: "Charlie"
2017	Decline and Fall	Davis	Episode: "King's Thursday"
2018–2022	The Tuckers	Glyn Tucker	19 episodes
2020	Inside No. 9	Mitch	Episode: "The Referee's a W***er"
2020-2022	After Life	Dog Waste Man	2 episodes
2024	Mrs. Brown's Boys	Slasher Sam Byrne	Episode: "B&B Mammy"
2025	Death Valley	Lloyd	
TBA	Better Later	Clive	Upcoming comedy
