= The Tuckers =

British television series

- Genre: Sitcom
- Created by: Steve Speirs
- Written by: Steve Speirs
- Directed by: Simon Massey; Ian Fitzgibbon
- Starring: Steve Speirs; Lynn Hunter; Joshua McCord; Ben McGregor; Alexandria Riley
- Composer: Andrew J. Jones
- Country of origin: United Kingdom
- Original language: English
- No. of series: 3
- No. of episodes: 19

Production
- Executive producer: Steven Canny
- Producer: Owen Bell
- Editor: Chris Blunden
- Camera setup: Multi-camera
- Production companies: BBC Cymru Wales; BBC Studios

Original release
- Network: BBC One Wales; BBC iPlayer
- Release: 31 October 2018 – 11 November 2022

The Tuckers is a Welsh television comedy series broadcast on BBC One Wales, written by and starring Steve Speirs with Lynn Hunter, Joshua McCord, Ben McGregor and Alexandria Riley also starring.

== Plot ==
Set in a fictional village of Tregarreg in the South Welsh Valleys, the show follows the Tucker family—a close-knit, multigenerational clan of “lovable rogues” who scrape by using their “legitimate” catering business and side hustles that are a bit under the table.

== Production ==
The concept for The Tuckers was developed by Steve Speirs, who also stars as Glyn Tucker, the head of the Tucker family. Speirs drew inspiration from his own South Wales upbringing, aiming to portray a realistic yet comedic snapshot of valley life, with an emphasis on family loyalty, resilience, and community.

A pilot episode aired on BBC One Wales in 2018 and was met with a positive reception. Encouraged by the response, the BBC commissioned a full series, which premiered in early 2020.

Following the success of the first series, the BBC commissioned two further seasons. Series 2 and Series 3 were filmed back-to-back in 2021.

In May 2023, it was officially confirmed that The Tuckers would not return for a fourth series. Steve Speirs announced the decision on social media, and the BBC later confirmed that they had "bid the characters farewell" after three series.

== Cast ==
- Steve Speirs as Glyn Tucker
- Robert Pugh as Murphy
- Lynn Hunter as Peggy Tucker
- Joshua McCord as Billy Tucker
- Ben McGregor as Bobby Tucker
- Alexandria Riley as Natalie Tucker
- Hope Reynolds as Shakira Tucker
- Jams Thomas as Clock
- Francois Pandolfo as Roberto (Series 1)
- John Weldon as Melvyn Munkley
- Kimberley Nixon as Lush

== Episodes ==
Series	Episodes	Originally released
Pilot		31 October 2018
1	6	10 January 2020
2	6	26 January 2022
3	6	7 October 2022
