= The Guest (British TV series) =

British television series

- Genre: Thriller
- Written by: Matthew Barry
- Directed by: Ashley Way
- Starring: Gabrielle Creevy; Eve Myles
- Music by: Blair Mowat
- Country of origin: United Kingdom
- Original language: English
- No. of episodes: 4

Production
- Executive producers: Matthew Barry; Rebecca Ferguson; Nick Andrews; Davina Earl; Nicola Shindler
- Producer: Karen Lewis
- Production companies: Quay Street Productions; BBC Cymru Wales

Original release
- Network: BBC One
- Release: 1 September – 22 September 2025

The Guest is a British thriller television miniseries written by Matthew Barry and directed by Ashley Way. It stars Gabrielle Creevy and Eve Myles. The series premiered on BBC One on 1 September 2025, with all four episodes released simultaneously on BBC iPlayer.

== Synopsis ==
A cleaner becomes captivated by her wealthy employer's charismatic influence. As their intense friendship grows and secrets emerge, their relationship spirals into a dangerous psychological game where nothing is quite what it seems.

== Cast and characters ==
- Gabrielle Creevy as Ria Powell
- Eve Myles as Fran Sharp
- Siôn Daniel Young as Lee Mace
- Bethan Mary-James as Sharla
- Julian Lewis Jones as Simon Sharp
- Clive Russell as Derek Abbott
- Emun Elliott as Richard Abbott
- Joseph Ollman as Mike Rice
- Catherine Ayers as Helen
- Lola Waters as Penny
- Clare Perkins as Annette
- Kimberley Nixon as Eleri Abbott
- Hannah Daniel as Gemma Rice
- Craig Gallivan as Marc
- Steffan Rhodri as Nick
- Remy Beasley as Lowri Evans

== Production ==
The series is written, created and executive produced by Matthew Barry, and is a co-production between BBC Cymru Wales and Quay Street Productions for BBC One. Davina Earl and Nicola Shindler executive produce for Quay Street Productions, with Rebecca Ferguson and Nick Andrews for the BBC. The series is directed by Ashley Way and produced by Karen Lewis.

The show was filmed in September through to November 2024 in Cardiff.

== Broadcast ==
The series premiered on BBC iPlayer and BBC One on 1 September 2025.

The series premiered in America on Showtime and Paramount+ on October 17.

It is also premiered in India on Lionsgate Play on 6 March 2026.

== Reception ==
Reviews of the series were generally positive, with most awarding four or three stars.

Rebecca Nicholson, writing in The Financial Times, called The Guest "a gripping gothic tale of rich and poor", awarding it 4 out of 5 stars.

Anita Singh, writing in The Telegraph, described the series as "surprisingly moreish", comparing it to a Harlan Coben thriller, awarding it 4 out of 5 stars. Carol Midgley of The Times also gave 4 out of 5 stars, praising the writing and pace, which hints at "darkness beneath the glossy surface."

Elle Magazine described the series as "wildly addictive."

Lucy Mangan, writing in The Guardian, gave it 3 out of 5 stars, calling it "a gloriously ridiculous thriller that slips down a treat". Vicky Jessop of The Standard also gave it 3 out of five, praising the acting but calling the plot "really silly". James Hibbs, writing in Radio Times, also awarded three stars, praising the direction and acting, and calling the first three "brilliantly crafted", but finding the resolution wanting, with too many mystery elements. Digital Spy also gave it three stars, saying "Creevy and Myles give exceptional performances that ground some of the more fantastical elements of the story".

The Independent was less complimentary, awarding the series 2 out of 5 and calling it "hogwash... like a deranged game of Jenga".

In September 2026, the series received five nominations at the BAFTA Cymru Awards.
