= Rapsgaliwn =

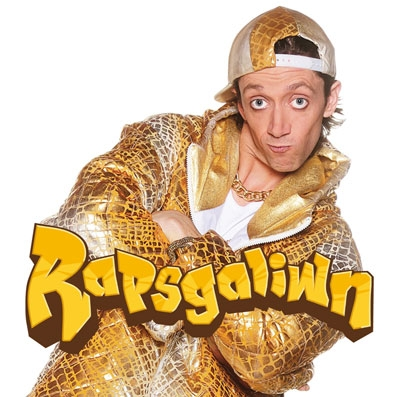
- Created by: Fflic
- Presented by: Rhodri Meilir, Gareth Milton
- Country of origin: United Kingdom
- Original language: Welsh
- No. of series: 1
- No. of episodes: 17

Production
- Production location: Various
- Running time: 15 minutes

Original release
- Network: S4C
- Release: 23 October 2010 – 31 December 2017

Rapsgaliwn is an S4C programme for pre-school children. It is shown on the Welsh-language children's television programming strand, Cyw.

Rapsgaliwn is a rapper, who claims to be 'the best rapper in the world'. He is recognised for wearing gold. He is Dona Direidi's cousin. Each episode revolves around children asking him a question and he produces a rap with the answer after doing a bit of research.

Despite being a Welsh language programme for Welsh speaking children, English subtitles are usually available with the phrases reworded in order to maintain a rhyming pattern after translation.
