= We Are Seven (TV series) =

- Genre: Drama
- Based on: We Are Seven by Una Troy
- Written by: Robert Pugh
- Directed by: Alan Clayton (1989); Ken Horn (1991)
- Starring: Helen Roberts; Christopher Mitchum; Julianne Barron; James Bird; Beth Robert; Jürgen Morche; Gudrun Gabriel; Howell Evans; Dafydd Hywel; Terence Bennett; Beth Morris; Melanie Walters; Huw Ceredig
- Composer: Jochen Eisentraut
- Country of origin: United Kingdom
- Original language: English
- No. of series: 2
- No. of episodes: 13

Production
- Producer: Alan Clayton
- Production locations: Llanddewi Brefi, Ceredigion, Dyfed, Wales, UK
- Running time: 58 minutes
- Production company: HTV Wales

Original release
- Network: ITV
- Release: 11 June 1989 – 17 July 1991

We Are Seven is a British television drama series set in Wales and based on the 1955 book of the same name by Una Troy. It was produced by HTV Wales and shown on ITV. It ran for two series between 11 June 1989 and 17 July 1991.

== History ==
The show's first season routinely received eight million viewers for each episode. At the 1990 edition of the New York International Film and TV Festival, the show season received a gold medal. The children in the cast largely are HTV Wales Junior Drama Workshop participants. The youngest child in the series was played by Gwilym, the 18-month old son of Helen Roberts, who plays the main character Bridget Morgan.

== Cast and characters ==
Actor	Character
Helen Roberts	Bridget Morgan
Christopher Mitchum	Tommy Morgan
Elen Carys Jones	Sissy Morgan
Andrew Powell	Willie Morgan
Julianne Barron	Pansy Morgan
James Bird	Toughy Morgan
Beth Robert	Mary Morgan
Jürgen Morche	Paul Hauptmann
Gudrun Gabriel	Sabina Hauptmann
Howell Evans	William Price
Dafydd Hywel	Jamesy James
Terence Bennett	Peter Morgan
Beth Morris	Rose Price
Melanie Walters	Helen Powell
Huw Ceredig	Jim Powell

== Episodes ==
=== Series 1 (1989) ===
1. "Episode 1" (11 June 1989); director: Alan Clayton
2. "Episode 2" (18 June 1989); director: Alan Clayton
3. "Episode 3" (25 June 1989); director: Alan Clayton
4. "Episode 4" (2 July 1989); director: Alan Clayton
5. "Episode 5" (9 July 1989); director: Alan Clayton
6. "Episode 6" (16 July 1989); director: Alan Clayton

=== Series 2 (1991) ===
1. "Episode 1" (29 May 1991); director: Ken Horn
2. "Episode 2" (5 June 1991); director: Ken Horn
3. "Episode 3" (12 June 1991); director: Ken Horn
4. "Episode 4" (26 June 1991); director: Ken Horn
5. "Episode 5" (3 July 1991); director: Ken Horn
6. "Episode 6" (10 July 1991); director: Ken Horn
7. "Episode 7" (17 July 1991); director: Ken Horn

== Home media ==
Both series were released individually on VHS in the UK by Video Gems in 1991.

== Analysis ==
The television series stars a woman who had seven children by six men. The Daily Post said, "In Sunday night family viewing time it hardly preaches the sort of morality that would get the Mary Whitehouse sort of approval."

== Reception ==
In a negative review, Moira Petty of The Stage and Television Today wrote, "It is quite astonishing that so many clichés could have been packed into one hour of television drama" and "To say that the pace was leisurely would be an understatement. Virtually every scene was strung out to tedious length as if, confronted by the quaint Hovis ad set pieces, the crew was afflicted by a mass breakout of catatonia." Sean Day-Lewis said in Broadcast that the series was "very Welsh and HTV" and "is amusing in an obvious sort of way". The Daily Post's John Williams said the series "fairly bristles with dialogue calculated to make any Welsh expatriot hurry back and joyfully submit to lyrical character assassination."

== See also ==
- List of Welsh television programmes
