= The Baker (2007 film) =

2007 British comedy crime film

- DVD cover art
- Directed by: Gareth Lewis
- Screenplay by: Gareth Lewis
- Produced by: Ariadne Getty; Damian Lewis; Justin Williams; Daniel Shepherd
- Starring: Damian Lewis; Kate Ashfield; Nikolaj Coster-Waldau; Dyfan Dwyfor; Anthony O'Donnell; Steve Speirs; Annette Badland
- Cinematography: Sean Bobbitt
- Edited by: Alan Strachan
- Music by: Alex Wurman
- Production companies: Picture Farm; Grandville Pictures
- Distributed by: 2 Entertain (UK); Screen Media Ventures
- Release dates: June 2007 (Tremblant Film Festival); 21 July 2007
- Running time: 86 minutes
- Country: United Kingdom
- Language: English
- Budget: $2.5 million

The Baker is a 2007 British comedy crime thriller film written and directed by Gareth Lewis and starring Damian Lewis, Kate Ashfield and Nikolaj Coster-Waldau. An ex-assassin retires to a small Welsh village and opens a bakery but is unable to escape his former associates.

The film premiered at the 2007 edition of the short-lived Tremblant Film Festival, where Lewis was awarded Best Director. After a brief theatrical release, the film was released to home video as Assassin in Love.

== Plot ==
Milo is a dissatisfied professional assassin. Cornering his latest target at his home, Milo has a change of heart and offers the man the chance to escape and assume a new identity, only for Bjorn, a rival assassin working for the same organization, to arrive and kill the man anyway. Bjorn makes it clear that he plans to use Milo's lapse in protocol to have his bosses order Milo's termination; they do so, assigning the kill to Bjorn. Milo narrowly escapes Bjorn's first attack, and after a conversation with his fellow assassin and friend Leo heads to Leo's country property in Gwynfyd (actually Grosmont, Monmouthshire), Wales to hide out while Leo works on making things safe for Milo.

When attempting to bury his gun case, Milo is knocked out by the remains of an exploding sheep, detonated by the unseen Eggs, a young conspiracy theorist who steals Milo's weapons while he is unconscious. The unconscious Milo is found and taken home by Rhiannon, local vet and part-time barmaid, who ensures he's healthy before returning him to his car. In the pub Milo meets landlord Bryn Morgan, who mistakes Milo for the village's new baker, as Leo's property is the former bakery. Not wanting to raise suspicion Milo goes along with this, and adopts the alias "Milo Shakespeare", inspired by a bust of William Shakespeare he notices on the bar.

Milo stays in hiding while Bjorn attempts to track his location using a photo of the bakery left behind by Milo. With Leo's efforts taking time, Milo commits to learning to bake to fit with his inadvertent cover identity. However, unbeknownst to him, Eggs has correctly (if illogically) concluded that Milo is really an assassin, but erroneously assumes that the bakery is a front for his assassination business. Before long the rumor has spread throughout most of village, save for Rhiannon and a few others. Believing the rumor, local fish and chip shop owner Rhys Edwards comes to Milo and asks him to "bake a cake" for his domineering wife Martha, Milo completely missing the intended subtext. The next day, Rhys unknowingly leaves a gas burner open and unlit before he leaves for work, and Martha is killed by the ensuing explosion when she goes to use the toaster. Gwynfyd's residents assume Milo was responsible, proving the rumors true in their minds.

Over the next weeks Milo's business picks up considerably, with several people ordering "cakes" for others in town. Eggs has started working for Milo as his assistant, wanting to become an assassin himself. One night Milo prepares for a date with Rhiannon, while Eggs prepares for a "date" with Bob, a local man in dispute with his neighbor Stan over the annual "best garden" award. Eggs arrives at Bob's house as he eats dinner and, nearly losing his nerve, fires a silenced shot into the house blindly. When Bob clutches his stomach in agony Eggs panics and flees. Milo's date with Rhiannon goes well, but is interrupted when Eggs arrives, drunk and distraught over his first murder, though he passes out before he can explain. Milo and Rhiannon take the unconscious Eggs back to the bakery, then have sex. Afterward, Eggs regains consciousness and explains what happened to Milo, who is stunned to realize the pleasant townsfolk who visited his bakery were actually ordering assassinations on each other. Rhiannon overhears the conversation and leaves, angry; Milo later tries to apologize for his past and not telling her sooner, but is rebuffed.

The next day Milo prepares to leave town, only to see Rhys fleeing the chip shop, stripped to his underwear and covered in various condiments; Milo and Eggs follow him to the pub. After a brief interruption at the arrival of Bob, who explains to a stunned Eggs that he merely burned his stomach when something knocked his hot dinner onto it, Rhys tells Milo and the rest of the town that a blond man - Bjorn - tortured him for information on Milo, and has now kidnapped Rhiannon to draw Milo out. Milo explains the truth behind Martha's death and his ignorance of their intent when placing cake orders with him to the now-ashamed townsfolk, then goes on to say that he wanted to get away from his life as an assassin and vows to rescue Rhiannon. He burns the list of "cake" orders in front of the townsfolk, explaining that "everyone deserves a second chance".

Milo confronts Bjorn, who reveals that his hatred of Milo stems from him rejecting Bjorn's desire to run away together with him, which Milo reminds him, not for the first time, "is not possible for so many reasons." Milo challenges Bjorn to fight "properly" rather than just killing Rhiannon; the two duel with foils, which seems to reach a climax until they discover the weapons are safety-tipped and unable to wound. They then switch to staves, which quickly break, then hand-to-hand, where Milo bests Bjorn. As Milo goes to free Rhiannon, Bjorn pulls a gun, but stops when the townsfolk appear and surround him, demanding he release "our baker". After some talking Bjorn finally decides to leave Milo be in the hope that Rhiannon will break his heart, whereupon Eggs knocks him out with a shovel.

Some time later Milo is preparing a cake at the bakery, assisted by Eggs who has developed skills as a pastrycook, eclipsing Milo's own. Leo arrives while Milo is alone in the kitchen; he explains that he used Milo's exile as an opportunity to stage a "hostile takeover" of the company, and as he is now in charge Milo is free to return to work without fear of being killed. To Leo's surprise Milo turns him down, saying he intends to remain a baker and will pay him a fair price for the shop. Leo is confused until he sees Rhiannon enter the shop, and leaves silently when Milo steps away to greet her. The two then go out to greet the entire village, there to enjoy the grand opening of Milo's bakery, "Shakespeare's Cake".

In a credits scene, Bjorn is revealed to have himself settled in Gwynfyd, with Bob.

== Cast ==
- Damian Lewis - Milo 'The Baker' Shakespeare
- Kate Ashfield - Rhiannon
- Nikolaj Coster-Waldau - Bjorn
- Dyfan Dwyfor - Eggs
- Anthony O'Donnell - Rhys Edwards
- Steve Speirs - Bryn
- Brian Hibbard - Bob
- William Thomas - Alun Thomas
- Michael Gambon - Leo

== Reception ==
=== Critical response ===
On the review aggregator website Rotten Tomatoes, 14% of 7 critics' reviews are positive, with an average rating of 3.5/10.
