= Cyw =

Welsh television block for children, broadcast on S4C

- Cyw end card
- Network: S4C
- Launched: 23 June 2008; 18 years ago
- Country of origin: United Kingdom (Wales)
- Format: Children's programming block
- Running time: 6 hours
- Original language: Welsh

Cyw (Welsh for 'chick', Welsh pronunciation: [kɨʊ]) is a Welsh-language children's television block from S4C, which launched on 23 June 2008.

Primarily aimed at children in the 3 to 6 age group, Cyw operates from Monday to Friday from 6am to 12pm, and includes programmes which have been previously broadcast by S4C in the Planed Plant Bach (Small Children's Planet) slot, such as "Bla Bla Blewog (Ha Ha Hairies) Sam Tân (Fireman Sam) Tomos a'i Ffrindiau (Thomas & Friends) and Bob y Bildar (Bob the Builder) as well as shows being transmitted for the first time in Welsh such as Dafydd a Bitw ac Owain a Henri, Heini, Y Brodyr Coala (The Koala Brothers), Y Teulu Mawr (The Large Family), Rapsgaliwn, Dona Direidi, Caio (Caillou) and Ben a Mali a'i byd bach o hud (Ben & Holly's Little Kingdom).

== Programmes ==
=== Current programmes ===
- Ben Dant
- Asra
- (Welsh version of Bing)
- Dwylo'r Enfys
- Hafod Haul
- Jen a Jim a'r Cywiadur
- Patrôl Pawennau (Welsh translation of Paw Patrol)
- Octonots (Welsh translation of Octonauts)
- Shwshaswyn
- Cacamwnci
- Dona Direidi
- Rapsgaliwn
- Llan-ar-goll-en (2013–present)
- Cyw a’i Ffrindiau
- Blociau Rhif (Welsh translation of Numberblocks)
- Cywion Bach
- Abadas (Welsh version of Abadas)
- Sam Tân (Welsh translation of Fireman Sam)
- (Welsh version of Odo)
- Y Brodyr Coala (Welsh translation of The Koala Brothers)
- Anifeiliaid Bach y Byd
- Timpo (Welsh translation of Tinpo)
- Blero'n Mynd i Ocido (Welsh translation of Messy Goes to OKIDO)
- Ahoi!
- Peppa (Peppa Pinc in the first series) (Welsh translation of Peppa Pig)
- Ben a Mali a'u Byd Bach O Hud (Welsh translation of Ben & Holly's Little Kingdom)
- Blociau Lliw (Welsh translation of Colourblocks)

=== Former programmes ===
- Bob y Bildar (Welsh translation of Bob the Builder)
- Dic a Dei a Delyth (Welsh translation of Dig & Dug with Daisy)
- (Welsh translation of Boj)
- Pingu (Welsh translation of Pingu)
- Teletubbies (Welsh translation of Teletubbies)
- Tweenies (Welsh translation of Tweenies)
- Meees
- Mona Y Fampir (Welsh translation of Mona the Vampire )
- Tecwyn y Tractor
- Y Dywysoges Fach (Welsh translation of Little Princess)
- Bach a Mawr (Welsh translation of Big & Small)
- Y Teulu Mawr (Welsh translation of The Large Family)
- Fflic a Fflac
- Bibi Bêl
- Triongl (2004–2011)
- Smot y Ci (Welsh translation of Spot (franchise))
- Un Tro (Welsh translation of Tellytales)
- Pen-blwydd Pwy? (Welsh translation of Pic Me)
- Bobi Jac (Welsh translation of Baby Jake)
- Rhacsyn a'r Goeden Hud
- Dwdlam
- Ribidirês
- Rala Rwdins
- Ari Awyren (Welsh translation of Jay Jay the Jet Plane)
- Nodi (Welsh translation of Noddy (TV series))
- Mr. Men a Miss Fach (Welsh Translation of Mr. Men and Little Miss)
- 123

== Channel presentation ==
=== Idents and graphics ===
The channel logo was built of the word Cyw in the Elementary SF Sans font, the C being in red, the y in yellow and the w in blue. Cyw is a non-commercial block, in a different format from its parent, S4C.

== Mascots ==
The channel features six characters, created as part of the channel's global identity, which are used as short animated bumpers into programmes.

The network mascots are the small titular female chick Cyw ("Chick"), a lion named Llew ("Lion"), an elephant named Plwmp ("Direct/Blunt" or "Plump"), a small fuchsia-coloured bird named Deryn ("Bird"), a giraffe named Jangl, a dog named Bolgi ("Glutton", and a play on the Welsh word for dog), and a three-legged female dachshund named Triog.

On October 4, 2018, Hoho Entertainment signed a co-production deal with S4C to create a localised version of Cyw's segments, titled Chickpea and Friends, with the Cyw character being renamed as the titular Chickpea. This series' VOD rights were later pre-sold to Canadian streaming site Kidoodle.TV in most countries and Tencent Video in China.

Cyw's characters were originally from Planed Plant Bach before it was replaced by Cyw.

== Future ==
In a press release, S4C announced that the plan would be eventually for Cyw to launch as a standalone channel. This was believed likely to occur during the switchover to DVB and DTT in the UK, which took place between 2007 and 2012. However, the launch never took place, and Cyw still remains as a block on S4C to this day.

Stwnsh has since replaced Planed Plant, providing two hours' of programmes every weekday evening.
