= Dyfan Dwyfor =

Welsh actor

- Born: Cricieth, Wales
- Education: Royal Welsh College of Music & Drama
- Occupation: Actor
- Height: 5 ft 10 in (178 cm)

Dyfan Dwyfor is a Welsh actor, originally from Criccieth.

== Early life ==
Dwyfor attended Ysgol Eifionydd, Porthmadog and Coleg Meirion Dwyfor before going on to Ysgol Glanaethwy. He graduated from the Royal Welsh College of Music & Drama in 2007.

== Career ==
Dwyfor began acting in the drama series Rownd a Rownd on S4C. His first appearance in film was in Oed yr Addewid ("Age of Promise"); the drama won three awards at BAFTA Cymru and a Golden FIPA.

He won the Richard Burton Award at the National Eisteddfod in 2004 and was nominated for a BAFTA Cymru award for the Euros Lyn film Y Llyfrgell (The Library Suicides) in 2017.

== Personal life ==
Dwyfor lives in London. He is a Welsh speaker.

== Works ==
=== Television ===
- A Very English Scandal - George Deakin
- Requiem - Ed
- Caerdydd - Jamie
- Rownd a Rownd - Tom
- Pen Tennyn - John Iwan
- A470 - Silver

=== Film ===
- Basket Case (2009) - Jez
- Oed yr Addewid (2002) - Stephen
- The Baker (2007) - Eggs
- I Know You Know (2008) - Paradise waiter
- Pride (2014) - Lee
- Y Llyfrgell (2016) - Dan

=== Theatre ===
- Little Eagles, RSC - Yuri Gagarin
- Romeo & Juliet, RSC - Peter
- Morte d'Arthur, RSC - Percival, Lamarak, Lavaine
- The Drunks, RSC - scene announcer, 1st Ilia
- The Comedy of Errors, RSC, The Swan Theatre, Stratford (2006) - Dromio of Ephesus
- As You Like It, RSC - William Silvius
- Six Characters in Search of an Author, Headlong Theatre - Son
- Hamlet, RSC - Laertes
- Fortune's Fool, The Old Vic (2013)
- Too Clever By Half, Royal Exchange Manchester (2013) - Gloumov
- Titus Andronicus, Globe Theatre (2014) - Lucius
- The Harvest, Ustinov Studio, Bath (2015) - Valerii
- Right Now (À Présent), Ustinov Studio, Bath (2016) - François
- Richard III, Shakespeare's Rose Theatre, York (2018) - Richard III
- Nye, Royal National Theatre & Wales Millennium Centre (2024) - Luke Williams and several other parts
- The Seagull, Lyceum Theatre, Edinburgh, (2025) - Trigorin
- The Prime of Miss Jean Brodie, National Theatre of Scotland, (2026) - Teddy Lloyd
