= The Bench (TV series) =

- Genre: Legal drama
- Created by: Catherine Treganna; Matthew Robinson
- Written by: Catherine Treganna
- Directed by: Matthew Evans; Elwyn Williams; Keith Washington
- Starring: Mark Lewis Jones; Phaldut Sharma; Anthony Selwood; Eiry Thomas; Eluned Jones; Philip McGough; Clive Willbond-Hill; Roger Evans; Brian Hibbard; Lesley Vickerage
- Country of origin: United Kingdom
- Original language: English
- No. of series: 2
- No. of episodes: 20

Production
- Executive producer: Matthew Robinson
- Producer: Karen Lewis
- Production location: Wales
- Editor: Will Oswald
- Running time: 30 minutes
- Production company: BBC Wales

Original release
- Network: BBC One
- Release: 17 October 2001 – 13 June 2002

The Bench is a Welsh television legal drama series, co-created by Matthew Robinson and lead writer Catherine Treganna, that first broadcast on BBC One Wales from 17 October 2001. The English-language series follows the daily lives of a group of the prosecutors and defenders of a busy magistrates court, including long suffering Des Davies (Mark Lewis Jones) and young whippersnapper Ranjit Singh (Phaldut Sharma).

Two series of the programme were broadcast, having been filmed back-to-back during the summer of 2001. The series was initially broadcast at 8:30pm on Fridays on BBC One Wales, before being repeated in their entirety an afternoon slot nationwide on BBC One from 27 May 2002. A late night repeat on BBC Two followed in June 2008. The series won three BAFTA Cymru awards in 2003, with Eiry Thomas winning Best Actress, Bill Broomfield winning Best Director of Photography for a drama series and Will Oswald winning Best Editor.

Neither series has been released on DVD, but in 2020, both were released in their entirety on Amazon Prime Video under a deal with Acorn TV, making them available in the United States for the first time.

== Cast ==
- Mark Lewis Jones as Des Davies
- Phaldut Sharma as Ranjit Singh
- Eiry Thomas as Cheryl Cates
- Eluned Jones as Val Sullivan
- Philip McGough as Peter Mansell
- Clive Willbond-Hill as Colin Francis
- Roger Evans as Hugh Evans
- Brian Hibbard as Ralph Jenkins
- Lesley Vickerage as Katharine Tyrell
- Anita Reynolds as Nita Jones
- Martin Cole as Wayne Hayward
- Rachel Isaac as Ange Collins
- Siwan Morris as Leanne Phillips

== Transmissions ==
| Series | Episodes | Originally released | |
| Series | Episodes | First released | Last released |
|---|---|---|---|
| 1 | 10 | 17 October 2001 | 19 December 2001 |
| 2 | 10 | 12 April 2002 | 13 June 2002 |

== Episodes ==
=== Series 1 (2001) ===
| No. overall | No. in series | Directed by | Written by | Original release date |
|---|---|---|---|---|
| 1 | 1 | Matthew Evans | Catherine Treganna | 17 October 2001 |
A hungover Des expects defending a local publican to be a walkover, but has not reckoned on the skills of new prosecutor Cheryl Cates. And for some young girls, the real drama takes place outside the courtroom.
| 2 | 2 | Emlyn Williams | Catherine Treganna | 24 October 2001 |
Leanne is trying to make a new life for herself, but her previous boyfriend has other plans. Meanwhile, Mrs Dee is determined to bring her son to justice.
| 3 | 3 | Emlyn Williams | Roger Williams | 31 October 2001 |
A family are left devastated after the death of a daughter in a road accident.
| 4 | 4 | Emlyn Williams | Roger Williams | 7 November 2001 |
Farmer Parry is accused of neglecting his animals, while Ange is accused of neglecting her baby.
| 5 | 5 | Emlyn Williams | Jon Treganna | 14 November 2001 |
Ranjit and Des place a bet on the outcome of a case involving a violent feud between two cockle-picking families.
| 6 | 6 | Emlyn Williams | Catherine Treganna | 21 November 2001 |
Matrimonial issues are on the agenda – not just in court, but behind the scenes as well.
| 7 | 7 | Keith Washington | Catherine Treganna | 28 November 2001 |
Simon and Gareth are in court to give evidence against Natalie, but find their relationship under scrutiny.
| 8 | 8 | Keith Washington | Catherine Treganna | 5 December 2001 |
Two teenagers give Des a hard time when he tries to defend them. A young doctor has to decide whether to tell the truth when confronted by the patient who assaulted her.
| 9 | 9 | Keith Washington | Catherine Treganna | 12 December 2001 |
Des and Ranjit fall out when Leanne and Brink re-appear in court on charge of possession. Meanwhile, Katherine is desperate for Hugh to open the box.
| 10 | 10 | Keith Washington | Jon Tregenna | 19 December 2001 |
Leanne's future hangs in the balance, forcing Des and Ranjit to examine their role in events.

=== Series 2 (2002) ===
| No. overall | No. in series | Directed by | Written by | Original release date |
|---|---|---|---|---|
| 11 | 1 | Keith Washington | Jon Tregenna | 12 April 2002 |
A mother and daughter are both on trial and must decide who takes the blame. Des can't resist being mean to a new rival.
| 12 | 2 | Matthew Evans | Catherine Treganna | 19 April 2002 |
When two desperate parents fight to get their children out of the care of social services, the magistrates must make a tough and heartbreaking decision. Katharine faces a crisis in her personal life.
| 13 | 3 | Matthew Evans | Catherine Treganna | 26 April 2002 |
When a defendant arrives drunk and disorderly for his trial, proceedings dissolve into chaos. Meanwhile, a loyal grandmother tries every trick in the book to win her grandson bail.
| 14 | 4 | Matthew Evans | Catherine Treganna | 3 May 2002 |
A married man's one night stand leads to bitterness and recrimination in and out of the courtroom. Cheryl's stressful day brings her closer to one of her colleagues.
| 15 | 5 | Matthew Evans | Catherine Treganna | 10 May 2002 |
Hugh faces a stark choice between his career and his personal loyalty to a defendant. Des has something to celebrate.
| 16 | 6 | Matthew Evans | Catherine Treganna | 17 May 2002 |
A father faces every parent's nightmare when his teenage son appears in court. Des is on a high in his personal life, but could get out of this depth when he decides to take on a hardened criminal as a client.
| 17 | 7 | Matthew Evans | Catherine Treganna | 29 May 2002 |
Ranjit realizes a client has become over-attached, and Des is compromised by his involvement with a criminal family. Work threatens to damage their personal lives.
| 18 | 8 | Matthew Evans | Jason Sutton | 5 June 2002 |
The magistrates are eagerly anticipating the ballot to decide the chair of Penbridge Magistrates' court. The friendship of rival candidates Val and Peter faces its greatest test.
| 19 | 9 | Matthew Evans | Jason Sutton | 12 June 2002 |
The press descend on the court for the sentencing of a teacher who had a relationship with a pupil. Meanwhile Des and Cheryl reach crisis point. Featuring Ruth Jones as Mandy Jenkins
| 20 | 10 | Matthew Evans | Catherine Treganna | 13 June 2002 |
When his client frames an innocent man, Des is not only compromised, but in great danger.

== See also ==
- List of Welsh television series
