= 2021 in Wales =

- Centuries: 19th; 20th; 21st
- Decades: 2000s; 2010s; 2020s
- See also: List of years in Wales; Timeline of Welsh history 2021 in The United Kingdom England Scotland Elsewhere

Events from the year 2021 in Wales.

== Incumbents ==
- First Minister – Mark Drakeford
- Secretary of State for Wales – Simon Hart
- Archbishop of Wales – John Davies, Bishop of Swansea and Brecon
- Archdruid of the National Eisteddfod of Wales – Myrddin ap Dafydd
- National Poet of Wales – Ifor ap Glyn

== Events ==
=== January ===
- 2 January – South Wales Police report that they received 240 reports of COVID-19 breaches on New Year's Eve and fined 43 people. During December as a whole, 430 fixed penalty notices were issued to people in breach of the restrictions.
- 7 January – A mountain rescue team is called out after police become stuck in snow while attending a car accident caused by a vehicle driving through road blocks on Moel Famau, Flintshire.
- 8 January – The Welsh government announces that COVID restrictions will be extended and strengthened, whilst a decision has been made not to reopen Welsh schools before half-term unless there is a significant fall in COVID cases.
- 20 January
  - Storm Christoph leads to severe flooding in North Wales, particularly at Bangor-on-Dee and Ruthin. In Denbighshire, a bridge over the River Clwyd collapses.
  - An investigation is launched into an incident that took place on 8 December 2020, when several Senedd members consumed alcohol on the premises whilst a ban on the sale, supply and consumption of alcohol in licensed premises was in force throughout Wales.
- 23 January – Paul Davies resigns as Leader of the Opposition in the Welsh Parliament, following an incident involving possible breaches of Welsh COVID-19 regulations. He is replaced by Andrew R. T. Davies.

=== February ===
- 6 February – Wales passes England's progress record for COVID-19 vaccinations as 17.7% of the population are reported to have received their first vaccinations.
- 7 February – Transport for Wales Rail begins operations within the Wales & Borders franchise.
- 10 February – Hollywood celebrities Ryan Reynolds and Rob McElhenney complete a takeover of Wrexham F.C., with fans' approval.
- 12 February
  - Wales becomes the first of the home countries to meet the target of offering COVID-19 vaccinations to all residents and staff in adult care homes, frontline health and social care workers, people aged 70 and over, and clinically vulnerable individuals. Mark Drakeford comments: "I'm just anxious to avoid the narrative that it is somehow a competition between UK nations... the contest is between the injection and the infection... We are the first nation in the UK to have reached this milestone, other nations will follow in the next couple of days. We're not in competition with one another. Every part of the UK is working as hard as it can to get to these milestones."
  - Archaeologists announce that they have identified the Waun Mawn stone circle as the possible original location of some of the bluestones now standing at Stonehenge.

=== March ===
- 5 March – A street in Treorchy is cordoned off by police, following a stabbing incident in which one person is killed and two others injured.
- 8 March – A recording is shown on S4C of Wales First Minister Mark Drakeford describing UK prime minister Boris Johnson as "really, really awful" during a meeting in December 2020. Later in the TV programme he says: "The world through Boris Johnson's eyes is so different to the world that people in Wales see. It's difficult sometimes to understand where he's coming from and why he's doing what he's doing."
- 21 March – A riot involving over 100 people takes place on a traveller site at Shirenewton in Cardiff. Several people are stabbed.

=== April ===
- 2 April – For the third time in a week, large crowds gather outside the Senedd building in Cardiff Bay, ignoring COVID-19 restrictions and leaving piles of rubbish in the area.
- 7 April – Glangwili General Hospital in Carmarthen becomes the first place in the UK to administer the Moderna COVID-19 vaccine.
- 25 April – At the 93rd Academy Awards, Sir Anthony Hopkins wins his second Academy Award for Best Actor for his performance in The Father, making him the oldest person to win an award in the category.

=== May ===
- 6 May
  - Elections to the devolved Welsh parliament take place throughout Wales. Despite COVID restrictions, voter turnout is slightly higher than in the previous elections in 2016. The Labour Party gains one seat overall, giving it 50% of total seats. UKIP lose all seven of the seats they previously held, leaving only four parties represented in the Senedd.
  - As part of a series of UK local elections happening on the same day, police and crime commissioners are up for reelection in England and Wales.
- 9 May – Plaid Cymru and Welsh Labour are confirmed as having held the PCC positions in Dyfed-Powys Police and Gwent Police respectively, whilst Labour take the North Wales Police commissioner position from Plaid Cymru.
- 20 May – Violence breaks out in an area of Swansea, involving about 100 people, triggered during a vigil for a local teenager who died suddenly two days earlier.
- 25 May – Rob Roberts, MP for Delyn, has the Conservative whip withdrawn and is suspended from the House of Commons after an independent expert panel endorses claims of sexual harassment against him.
- 30 May – Public Health Wales reveal the results of a study showing that, despite Wales having the lowest COVID infection rate of any of the four countries of the United Kingdom, an increasing number of people are not complying with COVID guidelines.

=== June ===
- 11 June – Welsh people receiving awards in the 2021 Birthday Honours include actor Jonathan Pryce (knighthood), broadcaster Beverley Humphreys (MBE), rugby player Ryan Jones (MBE) and singer Jeremy Huw Williams (BEM).
- 24 June – The Penarth Chamber Music Festival becomes the first live classical music event of the year in Wales.

=== July ===
- 20 July
  - A heatwave results in lower water levels at Llyn Dulyn, revealing the propeller of a US Dakota C-47 that crashed in the area on 11 November 1944. In all, the lake is thought to contain the remains of about eight crashed aircraft from the Second World War.
  - Police are called to Barry Island to deal with anti-social behaviour by an estimated 150 people.
- 21 July – It is announced that all NHS Wales employees will receive a 3% pay rise backdated to April 2021 as a result of a recommendation from the NHS Pay Review Body.
- 24 July – After an anti-lockdown protest in Cardiff city centre, some individuals gather outside the home of Mark Drakeford, prompting condemnation from other political parties and calls for a higher level of security for the First Minister. Former First Minister Carwyn Jones described the incident as "sinister".
- 28 July – The slate landscape of North Wales is inscribed on the list of World Heritage Sites in the United Kingdom.

=== August ===
- 2 August
  - Three people are arrested after the discovery of a child's body in a river in the Bridgend area.
  - A reduced National Eisteddfod of Wales (Eisteddfod Amgen) begins, promoted by the BBC.
- 7 August – COVID-19 restrictions in Wales are scheduled to revert to "level zero".
- 10 August – Stephen Cottrell, the Archbishop of York, whilst stating his approval for the principle of devolution, suggests that Wales and Scotland should sing "God Save The Queen" before sports matches as well as their own anthems.

=== September ===
- 13 September – Ashok Ahir is appointed interim President of the National Library of Wales, replacing Meri Huws, who resigned a month earlier.
- 29 September – A statue of Welsh teacher and activist Betty Campbell, by sculptor Eve Shepherd, is unveiled in Central Square, Cardiff.

=== October ===
- 5 October – The vicar of St Mary's Church, Aberavon, is expelled by the Church in Wales after being convicted of making indecent images of children.
- 8 October – Brains Brewery announces that it is putting 99 of its pubs up for sale. All are pubs already covered by a leasing agreement with Marston's brewery.
- 14 October – Queen Elizabeth II of the United Kingdom, accompanied by her son Charles, Prince of Wales, visits Wales for the first time in five years, to attend the opening of the sixth session of the Senedd. First Minister Mark Drakeford thanked her for her continued support.
- 19 October – Following the 2019 English Channel Piper PA-46 crash in which Cardiff City footballer Emiliano Sala was killed, David Henderson appears in court and pleads guilty to arranging a flight without permission or authorisation, but not guilty to a charge of endangering the safety of an aircraft.
- 24 October – The 30th BAFTA Cymru Awards take place, co-presented by Rakie Ayola, Matthew Rhys and Ant & Dec.
- 29 October – The Severn railway tunnel connecting Monmouthshire and Gloucestershire is closed as a result of flooding.
- 30 October
  - Three people are killed in a paddleboarding accident in the River Cleddau.
  - Severe weather continues to cause flooding in wales. The second landslide of the year affects the Nefyn area, causing road closures.

=== November ===
- 8 November – An injured caver is rescued from Ogof Ffynnon Ddu cave system in the Brecon Beacons, three days after he became trapped. The rescue effort involved 250 volunteers.
- 28 November – Plaid Cymru agrees a deal, containing 46 policies, with Welsh Labour in the Senedd.

=== December ===
- 5 December – Rugby player Ifan Phillips is involved in a motorcycle accident in Swansea, as a result of which he has a leg amputated.
- 6 December – Andy John is elected Archbishop of Wales in succession to John Davies

== Arts and culture ==
=== National Eisteddfod of Wales ===
- Chair: Gwenallt Llwyd Ifan, "Deffro"
- Crown: Dyfan Lewis, "Ar Wahân"
- Prose Medal: Lleucu Roberts, Y Stori Orau
- Drama Medal: Gareth Evans-Jones, Cadi Ffan a Jan
- Gwobr Goffa Daniel Owen: Lleucu Roberts, Hannah-Jane

=== Awards ===
- Wales Book of the Year 2021:
  - English language: Catrin Kean, Salt
  - Welsh language: Megan Angharad Hunter, Tu ôl i'r awyr
- Dylan Thomas Prize: Raven Leilani, Luster

=== New books ===
==== English language ====
- Peter Lord – Looking Out: Welsh Painting, Social Class and International Context
- Glyn Mathias & Daniel G. Williams (editors) – A Last Respect: The Roland Mathias Prize Anthology of Contemporary Welsh Poetry
- D. Ben Rees – Jim, The Life and Work of the Rt. Hon. James Griffiths
- Steve Wilkins - The Pembrokeshire Murders

==== Welsh language ====
- Philip Gross & Cyril Jones - Troeon/Turnings (bilingual)
- Ifor ap Glyn – Rhwng Dau Olau

=== Music ===
==== New albums ====
- Tom Jones - Surrounded by Time
- Bonnie Tyler - The Best Is Yet to Come

=== Film ===
- Gwledd (The Feast), starring Annes Elwy
- The Toll, starring Iwan Rheon and Annes Elwy

=== Broadcasting ===
==== English language ====
- In My Skin (series 2), starring Gabrielle Creevy
- The Pact, starring Aneurin Barnard, Jason Hughes, Eiry Thomas and Heledd Gwynn
- The Pembrokeshire Murders, starring Luke Evans
- Staged (series 2), starring Michael Sheen and filmed partly in Wales, using video-conferencing technology.
- The Story of Welsh Art, introduced by Huw Stephens
- UK/US drama series Becoming Elizabeth is partly filmed at Cardiff Castle.

==== Welsh language television ====
- Yr Amgueddfa, starring Nia Roberts and Steffan Rhodri.
- Fflam, starring Memet Ali Alabora
- Craith, series 3

==== Welsh language radio ====
- Cefn y Rhwyd (radio)
- Pod Rhod on Radio Aber (Welsh and English)

==== Awards ====
- BAFTA Cymru awards:
  - Best actor: Callum Scott Howells
  - Best actress: Morfydd Clark
  - Television drama: The Pembrokeshire Murders

== Sport ==
- 9 January – The Welsh Grand National takes place at Chepstow, rescheduled because of adverse weather from its original date in 2020. The race is won by Secret Reprieve, trained by Evan Williams at Llancarfan and ridden by Adam Wedge.
- 21 February – Jordan Brown wins the 2021 Welsh Open snooker tournament, held at the Celtic Manor Resort in Newport.
- 26 March – Wales emerge winners of the 2021 Six Nations Championship after Scotland defeat France in the final match of the championship.
- 26 July – Lauren Williams becomes the first Welsh athlete to win a medal at the 2020 Summer Olympics in Tokyo, when she wins a silver medal in the Women's Taekwondo.
- 30 July – Welsh rowers Oliver Wynne-Griffith and Josh Bugajski are part of the men's eight that wins gold in the Olympic rowing event.
- 27 December – The 2021 Welsh Grand National takes place behind closed doors at Chepstow Racecourse. The race is won by Iwilldoit, trained by Sam Thomas at Lisvane, the third successive winner of the race trained in Wales.

== Deaths ==
- 2 January – Brian Whitcombe, rugby player, 86
- 6 January – Osian Ellis, harpist, 92
- 19 January – Haydn Morris, rugby player, 92 (death announced on this date)
- 24 January – Aled Lloyd Davies, musician and teacher, 91 (date announced)
- 1 February (in Malaysia) – Merryl Wyn Davies, writer and broadcaster, 71
- 6 February
  - Ezra Moseley, Barbadian cricketer, former Glamorgan player, 63 (road accident in Barbados)
  - Ken Roberts, footballer, 84
- 10 February – Dai Davies, footballer, 72
- 14 February
  - Catherine Belsey, literary critic and Fellow of the Learned Society of Wales, 80
  - Hywel Francis, politician, 74
  - Doug Mountjoy, snooker player, 78
- 16 March – Euryn Ogwen Williams, broadcaster and author, 78
- 29 March – Elaine Hugh-Jones, pianist and composer, 93
- 4 April – Cheryl Gillan, former Secretary of State for Wales, 68
- 11 April – Colin Baker, Wales international footballer, 86
- 16 April
  - John Dawes, Wales international rugby captain, 80
  - Richard Parry-Jones, engineer and car designer, 69
- 23 May – Dennis A'Court, cricketer, 83
- 26 May – Llew Smith, politician, 77
- 7 June – Ben Roberts, actor, 70
- 10 June – Sir David Allan Rees, biochemist and science administrator, 85
- 11 June – Gerald Williams, nephew of Hedd Wyn and custodian of "Yr Ysgwrn", 92
- c.20 June – David R. Edwards, singer, 56
- 7 July – Elystan Morgan, Baron Elystan-Morgan, politician, 88
- 11 July – Jack Windsor Lewis, phonetician, 94
- July – Mike Smith, first non-Welshman to manage the Wales football team (1974-79, 1994-95), 83
- 21 July – Siân James, novelist, 90
- 24 July – Buddug Williams, actress, 88
- 30 July – Roger Boore, publisher and author, 82
- 5 August – Terry Davies, rugby player, 87
- 14 August – Charli Britton, drummer (John ac Alun), 68
- 26 August – Taffy Owen, speedway rider, 85
- 12 September – Owain Williams, rugby international, 56
- 16 September – Alan Fox, footballer, 85
- 19 September – Max Wiltshire, Wales international rugby union player, 83.
- 29 September – Glyn Moses, rugby union and rugby league footballer, 93
- 5 November – Mei Jones, actor and writer, 68
- 24 November – Frank Burrows, Scottish-born football manager, former manager of both Cardiff City and Swansea City, 77
- 30 December – Ron Jones, Olympic athlete, 87
