= List of Welsh films =

This is a chronological list of films produced in Wales. It is divided among those that are in the English language, Welsh language, and no language (silent films).

== Silent films ==
=== 1890s ===
- 1898: Conway Castle
- 1898: Blackburn Rovers v West Bromwich Albion, is the world's oldest extant football film, by Arthur Cheetham.

=== 1900s ===
- 1907: Wales, England: Land of Castles and Waterfalls

=== 1910s ===
- 1913: The Foreman's Treachery, by Charles Brabin.
- 1915: A Welsh Singer was adapted from a novel by Allen Raine and starred Florence Turner.
- 1918: The Life Story of David Lloyd George

== Welsh-language films ==
=== 1930s ===
- 1935: Y Chwarelwr (The Quarryman), was the first Welsh language sound film, directed by Ifan ab Owen Edwards.

=== 1940s ===
- 1949: Yr Etifeddiaeth (The Heritage) is a documentary by John Robert Williams.

=== 1970s ===
- 1975: Gwaed ar y Ser (Blood on the Stars), is a horror film, Directed by Wil Aaron

=== 1980s ===
- 1981: O'r Ddaear Hen was directed by Wil Aaron and scripted by Gwyn Thomas.
- 1986: Milwr Bychan (Boy Soldier), directed by Karl Francis.
- 1986: Rhosyn a Rhith (Coming Up Roses), directed by Stephen Bayly.

=== 1990s ===
- 1991: Un Nos Ola Leuad, directed by Endaf Emlyn.
- 1992: Hedd Wyn was nominated for the Academy Award for Best Foreign Language Film in 1992. It won a BAFTA Award for Best Film in the year of its release. It was directed by Paul Turner.
- 1993: Cwm Hyfryd (My Pretty Valley), also directed by Paul Turner, concerns itself with a critique of Thatcherism, particularly as it relates to the closing of mines in Wales.
- 1993: Gadael Lenin (Leaving Lenin), about a group of Welsh students and teachers who take a trip to Russia, was directed by Endaf Emlyn.
- 1993:Tân ar y Comin, based on the novel by T. Llew Jones, about a young Romani who lives an idyllic life with his grandfather. Also released under the English title "A Christmas Reunion" (1994).
- 1994: Ymadawiad Arthur (Arthur's Departure), was directed by Marc Evans and starred Llyr Ifans.
- 1995: Y Mapiwr, directed by Endaf Emlyn.
- 1997: Tylluan Wen (A White Owl), directed by Alun Ffred Jones.
- 1998: Y Mynydd Grug (The Heather Mountain), directed by Angela Barbara Roberts.
- 1998: Pum Cynnig i Gymro (Bride of War) was directed by Peter Edwards. It was also released in English, German and Polish.
- 1999: Solomon & Gaenor starred Ioan Gruffudd. An English-language version was also filmed at the same time. It was directed by Paul Morrison.

=== 2000s ===
- 2002: Eldra, directed by Timothy Lyn, is about a Romani family living in North Wales
- 2003: Y Mabinogi, also featuring Ioan Gruffudd, is a combined live-action and animated version of Welsh collection of tales known as the Mabinogion, directed by Derek W. Hayes
- 2005: Y Lleill, directed by Emyr Glyn Williams
- 2006: Calon Gaeth (Small Country), directed by Ashley Way
- 2008: Cwcw written and directed by Delyth Jones

=== 2010s ===
- 2010: Patagonia, directed by Marc Evans, filmed in Welsh, English and Spanish.
- 2013: Y Syrcas (The Circus), directed by Kevin Allen, filmed in Welsh.
- 2015: Under Milk Wood, directed by Kevin Allen; another version simultaneously filmed in English.
- 2015: Yr Ymadawiad (The Passing), directed by Gareth Bryn and starring Mark Lewis Jones.
- 2016: Y Llyfrgell (aka The Library Suicides), directed by Euros Lyn and written by Fflur Dafydd; set in The National Library of Wales

=== 2020s ===
- 2021: Gwledd (The Feast), a fantasy horror film set in Wales; directed by Lee Haven Jones
- 2023: Y Sŵn, directed by Lee Haven Jones
- 2024: Dwbwl Trwbwl - a Welsh comedy short film (40 mins) directed by Gruff Huws about a Darts rivalry getting out of hand in the town of Llangefni.
- 2025: Tanau’r Lloer (Fires of the Moon), a Welsh-language opera film directed by Chris Forster, inspired by the novel Un Nos Ola Leuad by Caradog Pritchard
- 2026: Effi o Blaenau, directed by Marc Evans
- 2026: Star Wars: Gobaith Newydd is a Welsh-language dub of the original 1977 Star Wars film..

== English-language films set in Wales ==
=== 1930s ===
- 1932: The Old Dark House, starring Boris Karloff, was directed by James Whale.
- 1935: The Phantom Light, directed by Michael Powell, was filmed at various locations including South Stack, Holyhead, and Ffestiniog Railway.
- 1937: Today We Live is a communist agitprop documentary by Ralph Bond concerning unemployed miners in Pentre, Rhondda.
- 1937: Eastern Valley, by Donald Alexander.
- 1938: The Citadel, set in a Welsh mining town, was directed by King Vidor.

=== 1940s ===
- 1940: The Proud Valley, concerning Welsh coal miners, was directed by Pen Tennyson.
- 1941: How Green Was My Valley was a classic directed by John Ford. It won five Academy Awards, including Best Director and Best Picture. However, the film is often criticised for the actors having Irish accents, as several of them were Irish, and for having a scene with an Irish jig instead of a traditional Welsh dance. Ford's response to these criticisms were simply, "It's a Celtic country, isn't it?"
- 1941: The Wolf Man, featuring Bela Lugosi, was directed by George Waggner.
- 1944: The Halfway House, directed by Basil Dearden.
- 1945: The Corn Is Green, starring Bette Davis, was directed by Irving Rapper.
- 1948: The Three Weird Sisters was filmed near Aberdare, directed by Daniel Birt.
- 1949: The Last Days of Dolwyn was filmed at the Lake Vyrnwy dam. It was Richard Burton's first screen role and was directed by Emlyn Williams.
- 1949: A Run for Your Money, directed by Charles Frend.
- 1949: Blue Scar, by Jill Craigie, is about the nationalization of the coal industry in Wales.

=== 1950s ===
- 1950: The Undefeated, by Paul Dickson.
- 1950: David, by Paul Dickson.
- 1952: Hindle Wakes was filmed at Great Orme, Llandudno. Directed by Arthur Crabtree.
- 1952: Girdle of Gold, a comedy set in Wales about Evans the milk and Griffith the hearse searching for a pair of corsets. Directed by Montgomery Tully.
- 1953: Valley of Song was filmed at Dryslwyn and Llanfynydd, Carmarthenshire, directed by Gilbert Gunn.
- 1954: The Constant Husband was filmed in Newquay and Aberaeron starring Rex Harrison it was directed by Sidney Gilliat.
- 1954: The Happiness of Three Women (aka - wishing well ) is directed by Maurice Levey.
- 1955: The Blue Peter was filmed around Aberdovey and Cadair Idris, Dolgellau. Directed by Wolf Rilla.
- 1958: Law and Disorder was filmed in Newport, Pembrokeshire and Fishguard Harbour, directed by Charles Crichton.
- 1959: Tiger Bay takes place in Tiger Bay, Cardiff, Wales, and was directed by J. Lee Thompson.

=== 1960s ===
- 1962: Dylan Thomas is a short documentary on the poet featuring the narration of the Welsh actor Richard Burton. Directed by Jack Howells, it won the 1963 Academy Award for Best Documentary Short.
- 1962: Only Two Can Play starred Peter Sellers as the Welsh character John Lewis, and was directed by Sidney Gilliat.
- 1963: Bitter Harvest was filmed in Cardiff and Senghenydd, directed by Peter Graham Scott.
- 1967: Jules Verne's Rocket to the Moon, directed by Don Sharp.

=== 1970s ===
- 1972: Under Milk Wood was a film version of Dylan Thomas's "play for voices", starring Pontrhydyfen-born actor Richard Burton, then-wife Elizabeth Taylor and Peter O'Toole. It was directed by Andrew Sinclair.
- 1973: Holiday on the Buses was filmed at Prestatyn in the Pontins holiday camp, directed by Bryan Izzard.
- 1973: Hang Up Your Brightest Colours is a once-banned documentary by Kenneth Griffith on Irish Republican Michael Collins.
- 1976: At the Earth's Core, directed by Kevin Conner, takes place in the Welsh mountains.
- 1976: Above Us the Earth, by Karl Francis.
- 1976: Whispers of Fear A woman inherits an old house in Wales, but is driven to madness and murder by jealous locals. Directed by Harry Bromley Davenport.
- 1977: Curious Journey, a documentary by Kenneth Griffith.
- 1978: Dylan is about Dylan Thomas's final visit to America, concluding with his death in New York on 9 November 1953, and directed by Richard Lewis.
- 1978: Grand Slam is a BBC Wales film about Welsh rugby fans travelling to Paris for the Grand Slam of Wales vs. France.
- 1979: Black As Hell, Thick As Grass is a documentary by Kenneth Griffith.
- 1979: The Corn Is Green was written by Ivan Davis, based on a play by Emlyn Williams. It starred Katharine Hepburn, Bill Fraser, Patricia Hayes, Artro Morris, Dorothea Phillips and Toyah Willcox.

=== 1980s ===
- 1980: The Mouse and the Woman was filmed at Lampeter House, directed by Karl Francis.
- 1982: Giro City, by Karl Francis.
- 1982: Who Dares Wins outdoor training scenes were filmed in Snowdonia, starring Lewis Collins and directed by Ian Sharp.
- 1983: House of the Long Shadows was directed by Pete Walker. It comments on the nationalism of the Welsh, especially the older generation, who hate the English; the American jokes that he should wear a leek to show he's a friend. Vincent Price, who has a Welsh surname, plays a character who describes Wales as his ancestral homeland. His character's family appears to be English, however.
- 1985: Ms Rhymney Valley, by Karl Francis
- 1987: Girls' Night Out is an S4C film by Joanna Quinn.
- 1987: A Child's Christmas in Wales is a TV-movie based on Dylan Thomas's work of the same name, starring Denholm Elliott and directed by Don McBrearty.
- 1987: On the Black Hill is about Welsh identical twins, and was directed by Andrew Grieve.

=== 1990s ===
- 1990: Dylan Thomas: Return Journey is a one-man show featuring Bob Kingdom as Thomas and directed by Anthony Hopkins.
- 1992: Elenya, concerning a woman of Italian descent living in Wales, was directed by Steve Gough.
- 1992: Under Milk Wood is an animated adaptation of the Dylan Thomas play.
- 1992: Rebecca's Daughters; filmed at Hensol Castle and St. Donats Castle, Atlantic College, directed by Karl Francis. About the Rebecca Riots, and based on a screenplay by Dylan Thomas.
- 1994: Second Best, starring William Hurt, Alan Cumming and Chris Cleary Miles, was directed by Chris Menges.
- 1994: Backbeat was filmed at the Point of Ayr Lighthouse on Talacre Beach, directed by Iain Softley.
- 1995: The Englishman Who Went Up a Hill But Came Down a Mountain, starring Hugh Grant, was directed by Christopher Monger.
- 1995: Streetlife, starring Rhys Ifans, was directed by Karl Francis.
- 1996: August, directed by Margam, Wales-born actor/director Anthony Hopkins, is an adaptation of Chekov's Uncle Vanya, set in North Wales.
- 1996: Darklands, concerning Druidic cults, was directed by Julian Richards.
- 1997: Twin Town, starring brothers Rhys Ifans and Llyr Ifans, was directed by Kevin Allen.
- 1997: House of America, starring Siân Phillips and Matthew Rhys, was directed by Marc Evans.
- 1997: Prince Valiant, directed by Anthony Hickox and based on the comic strip series. It was partially filmed in Wales, and is partly set in Wales.
- 1997: The Proposition, directed by Strathford Hamilton.
- 1999: Human Traffic, directed by Justin Kerrigan.
- 1999: Famous Fred, by Joanna Quinn.
- 1999: Solomon & Gaenor starred Cardiff-born actor Ioan Gruffudd. A Welsh-language version was also filmed at the same time. It was directed by Paul Morrison.
- 1999: The Funeral of the Last Gypsy King, a short film directed by Jane Rogoyska.

=== 2000s ===
- 2000: The Testimony of Taliesin Jones (aka Small Miracles), starred John Paul Macleod and Jonathan Pryce, and was directed by Martin Duffy.
- 2000: House!, about Bingo rivalries in South Wales, starred Kelly Macdonald and was directed by Julian Kemp.
- 2001: Very Annie Mary, starring Rachel Griffiths, Holywell-born Jonathan Pryce and Ioan Gruffudd, was directed by Sara Sugarman.
- 2001: Happy Now, starring Ioan Gruffudd, was directed by Philippa Cousins.
- 2001: Endgame was directed by Gary Wicks; much of the film takes place at the main character's Welsh cottage.
- 2002: On All Floors was directed by Geoff Evans and written by Craig Handley.
- 2002: Plots with a View (aka: Undertaking Betty), was directed by Nick Hurran and starred Brenda Blethyn, Alfred Molina, Christopher Walken, and Lee Evans. This brilliant, but commercially unsuccessful, black comedy about competing undertakers in the small fictional Welsh village of Wrottin Powys won the BAFTA Cymru Award in 2003. It is not yet released in the UK.
- 2003: Otherworld, the English-language version of the film Y Mabinogi, is listed above in the Welsh-language section.
- 2003: I'll Be There was written and directed by Scottish comedian Craig Ferguson and featured Welsh singer Charlotte Church.
- 2004: A Way of Life was filmed in Swansea and Cardiff, directed by Amma Asante.
- 2005: The Dark starred Sean Bean and Maria Bello. While taking place in Wales, it reinvisions the Otherworld (from The Mabinogion) as being a place of hellish torment. It was directed by John Fawcett.
- 2005: Evil Aliens takes place on the Welsh island of Scallad, and was directed by Jake West.
- 2005: Ramble On, an animated short directed by Tom Parkinson.
- 2006: Dirty Sanchez: The Movie is the Welsh equivalent of Jackass: The Movie, but arguably raunchier. It was directed by Jim Hickey.
- 2006: Love You, Joseff Hughes, a short directed by Dan Hartley.
- 2006: In the film adaptation of Stormbreaker, Alex Rider receives military training in the Brecon Beacons.
- 2006: The Haunted Airman starred Robert Pattinson as an injured aviator who convalesces in Wales.
- 2007: The Baker, AKA Assassin in Love was directed by Gareth Lewis, about a hitman who retires to a rural Welsh village as a baker.
- 2008: The Edge of Love starred Matthew Rhys as Dylan Thomas, Keira Knightley, Sienna Miller (as Dylan's wife, Caitlin Macnamara) and Cillian Murphy. Directed by John Maybury, this film is about part of Thomas' life in Swansea during World War II.
- 2009: Good Arrows was filmed in Merthyr Tydfil, directed by Helen Grace and Irvine Welsh.
- 2009: Amelia starred Hilary Swank, Richard Gere and Ewan McGregor. As Amelia crosses the Atlantic, she arrives in Wales (thinking it's Ireland), and the locals sing the hymn "Calon Lân".
- 2009: Believe: The Eddie Izzard Story mentions that Eddie tried to learn a bit of the Welsh language before playing a gig in Pwllheli, Wales. He also lived in Skewen, Wales, as a child. The documentary also mentions that Eddie is the favourite comedian of Anthony Hopkins.
- 2009: A Bit of Tom Jones? was filmed around Tredegar; directed by Peter Watkins-Hughes.

=== 2010s ===
- 2010: Big Font. Large Spacing is a feature about two students completing a psychology essay in one night. The film was all shot in Cathays in Cardiff.
- 2010: Devil's Bridge was filmed in Cardiff and Pembrokeshire; directed by Chris Crow.
- 2010: Submarine is set in Swansea; starring Welsh actor Craig Roberts.
- 2010: Risen is a biopic of Welsh champion boxer Howard Winstone.
- 2011: Resistance is a film based in an alternative reality in which Nazi Germany invades the United Kingdom during the Second World War; based on the novel by Owen Sheers.
- 2013: A Field in England, a psychedelic horror film set in 17th century Monmouthshire (a county of contemporary Wales, but which was not clearly labeled as part of Wales at the time).
- 2013: One Chance is a British-American biographical film about opera singer and Britain's Got Talent winner Paul Potts
- 2014: Set Fire to the Stars is a film about Welsh poet Dylan Thomas.
- 2014: Pride was filmed in Banwen, Onllwyn and is based on a true story about the gay activists work to help the miners; directed by Matthew Warchus.
- 2015: Just Jim, the directorial debut of Craig Roberts, is set and filmed in the actor's home village of Maesycwmmer.
- 2015: Dark Horse was based on a true story filmed in Blackwood and Chepstow, directed by Louise Osmond.
- 2016: Miss Peregrine's Home for Peculiar Children (film), set on the fictional island of Cairnholm
- 2018: Say My Name was set on a Welsh island but filmed around Cardiff, directed by Deborah Frances-White.
- 2018: Last Summer, four boys roam free through a neglected rural paradise in Wales, until a tragedy strikes, directed by Jon Jones.
- 2019: Gwen is a folk tale set and filmed in Snowdonia during the industrial revolution. Directed by William McGregor.

=== 2020s ===
- 2020: You Should Have Left, directed by David Koepp and starring Kevin Bacon and Amanda Seyfried; filmed in Llanbister.
- 2020: Let Them All Talk, directed by Steven Soderbergh. Refers to a fictional Welsh author named Blodwyn Pugh; characters visit her grave at a convent near Cardiff (most of the film is not set in Wales). Meryl Streep's character sings The Ash Grove in this scene.
- 2021: The Toll, directed by Ryan Andrew Hooper and set in Pembrokeshire.
- 2021: The Green Knight, written and directed by David Lowery (director), starring Dev Patel; based on the poem Sir Gawain and the Green Knight. An Arthurian tale that also refers to the legend of Saint Winifred. While not clearly stated in the film itself, a promotional video suggests that the entire story is set in what-would-become Wales, with Gawain's journey beginning in Camelot in the south and ending in the north.

== Other Welsh-related films ==
=== Films with Welsh characters (but not set in Wales) ===
- 1952: Cosh Boy is a film in which the main character's mother is Welsh. It was directed by Lewis Gilbert.
- 1956: In The Searchers, directed by John Ford, the character Martin Pawly claims that he is 1/8 Cherokee, and the rest is English and Welsh.
- 1958: Look Back in Anger, starred Welsh actor Richard Burton and featuring the Welsh character, Cliff. It was directed by Tony Richardson.
- 1958: The Vikings has Rhodri Mawr as a character, and his daughter Morgana (played by Janet Leigh).
- 1959: I'm All Right, Jack starred Peter Sellers and featured a Welsh worker named Dai. It was directed by John Boulting.
- 1959: Upstairs and Downstairs features a Welsh female character, and was directed by Ralph Thomas.
- 1962: Eva (1962 film), an Italian-French production about a Welshman in Venice.
- 1964: Zulu, starring Michael Caine, depicts the struggle of a detachment of a Welsh regiment against Zulu warriors. It was directed by Cy Endfield.
- 1968: Candy, features Richard Burton as a Welsh alcoholic poet, MacPhisto.
- 1970: The Molly Maguires, directed by Martin Ritt and starring Sean Connery, tells the story of the Irish labor troubles in the anthracite coal mines of Schuylkill County, Pennsylvania. Several characters, including the police chief Davies (played by Englishman Frank Finlay), and a miner Jenkins (played by Englishman John Alderson), are Welsh.
- 1971: Two English Girls (Les Deux anglaises et le continent) was directed by François Truffaut. Despite the title, the titular "English girls" live in Wales where the first half of the film is set.
- 1971: 10 Rillington Place, directed by Richard Fleischer, stars John Hurt as a Welshman living in London.
- 1977: In A Bridge Too Far, one of the final scenes features a minor character nicknamed Taff.
- 1978: The Hound of the Baskervilles features Dudley Moore portraying a Welsh Doctor Watson, reusing a version of his Welsh accent from the 1967 film Bedazzled.
- 1979: The Life of Brian, a film by Monty Python, features a character named Judith (played by Sue Jones-Davies) who is referred to by Brian's mother as a "Welsh tart." Several other references to Welsh characters can be gleaned from the screenplay.
- 1980: The Falls, directed by Welsh-born filmmaker Peter Greenaway, references the Welsh-born character Tulse Luper.
- 1983: Taking Tiger Mountain, references a Welsh Minister of Prostitution. It was directed by Tom Huckabee, based on a novella by William S. Burroughs.
- 1991: Old Scores, set in New Zealand, is about a former Welsh rugby star. It was directed by Alan Clayton.
- 1994: Au Pair was directed by Angelika Weber. The main character and her boyfriend are Welsh.
- 1997: The Replacements, features Rhys Ifans as a Welsh soccer player who is recruited to play American football. When called a "Mick" by teammates, he asserts that he is Welsh, not Irish. It was directed by Howard Deutch.
- 1999: Notting Hill, features Rhys Ifans as a Welsh character called Spike.
- 2000: The Man Who Cried, about a Jewish girl who leaves the Soviet Union to be raised in England, utilises a Welsh music teacher to help aid in the girl's assimilation to English culture. As he was not allowed to speak Welsh but succeeded professionally after learning English, so will she succeed if she abandons her native tongue.
- 2003 and following: The Tulse Luper Suitcases is a multimedia project by Welsh-born filmmaker Peter Greenaway concerning the Welsh-born character Tulse Luper.
- 2004: Heights, starring Glenn Close, features Andrew Howard as the Welsh character, Ian. It was directed by Chris Terrio.
- 2011: The Rite features Anthony Hopkins as Father Lucas, a Welsh exorcist, living in Rome.
- 2013: Evil Dead (2013 film), directed by Fede Álvarez; a character speaks in Welsh.
- 2017: Finding Your Feet, directed by Richard Loncraine. John Sessions plays a Welsh character.
- 2020: Dolittle (film), directed by Stephen Gaghan; Robert Downey Jr. plays the titular Welsh character.

=== Filmed on location in Wales, but set elsewhere ===
- 1931: The Ghost Train was filmed at Barmouth Viaduct and directed by Walter Forde.
- 1940: The Thief of Bagdad was filmed at Freshwater West, Pembrokeshire.
- 1941: The Ghost Train was filmed at Fairbourne Station and Barmouth Bridge. Directed by Walter Forde.
- 1943: Nine Men was filmed in Margam Burrows, Kenfig. Directed by Harry Watt.
- 1951: Pandora and the Flying Dutchman was filmed on Pendine Sands. Directed by Albert Lewin.
- 1952: The Card was filmed in Llandudno directed by Ronald Neame.
- 1953: The Red Beret was filmed around Trawsfynydd, Gwynedd, directed by Terence Young.
- 1954: Prince Valiant was filmed at Caernarvon Castle, directed by Henry Hathaway .
- 1954: The Black Knight was filmed at Castle Coch starring Alan Ladd. It was directed by Tay Garnett.
- 1956: Moby Dick was filmed in Fishguard Harbour, starring Gregory Peck and directed by John Huston
- 1957: The Good Companions is about a travelling troupe and had its exterior shots filmed in Wales. Directed by J. Lee Thompson.
- 1958: The Inn of the Sixth Happiness, featuring Ingrid Bergman, Curd Jurgens, and Robert Donat, was filmed on location in Wales in Gwynedd and Beddgelert, but is set in China.
- 1961: The Green Helmet was filmed in Portmeirion, directed by Michael Forlong.
- 1961: Fury at Smugglers Bay was filmed in Abereiddi Bay, Pembrokeshire, directed by John Gilling.
- 1962: Lawrence of Arabia was filmed at Merthyr Mawr Sand Dunes, directed by David Lean.
- 1962: The Inspector (Lisa) had its final scenes filmed at Three Cliffs Bay, Tower. Directed by Philip Dunne.
- 1963: From Russia with Love, the second James Bond film, was filmed in Snowdonia starring Sean Connery and Robert Shaw. Directed by Terence Young.
- 1963: Siege of the Saxons was filmed at Castle Coch, directed by Nathan Juran.
- 1966: Arabesque was filmed at the Crumlin Viaduct, Caerphilly and was demolished after filming. It starred Gregory Peck and Sophia Loren, directed by Stanley Donen.
- 1967: Poor Cow was filmed at Blaen-y-glyn waterfall in the Brecon Beacons, directed by Ken Loach.
- 1968: The Lion in Winter, featuring Welsh actors Anthony Hopkins and Timothy Dalton in their first feature films, was filmed on location in Wales but is set in France.
- 1969: Carry on up the Khyber is the sixteenth Carry On film, released in 1968. It stars Carry On regulars Sid James, Kenneth Williams, Charles Hawtrey, Joan Sims, Bernard Bresslaw and Peter Butterworth. The film is, in part, a spoof of "Kiplingesque" movies and television series about life in the British Empire, both contemporary and from earlier, Hollywood, periods. Scenes on the North West Frontier were filmed beneath the summit of Snowdon in North Wales.
- 1969: The Most Dangerous Man in the World (The Chairman) starred Gregory Peck and was filmed in the Ogwen Valley, Snowdonia which doubled for China. Directed by J. Lee Thompson
- 1971: Zeppelin was filmed at Carreg Cennen Castle starred Michael York and was directed by Etienne Perier.
- 1971: Unman, Wittering and Zigo was filmed in Llandudno and Colwyn Bay, directed by John Mackenzie.
- 1971: Macbeth, directed by Roman Polanski, was filmed at Harlech Castle, Snowdonia and Porthmadog.
- 1972: Young Winston was filmed at Craig-y-Nos, and Morlais colliery doubled for South Africa, directed by Richard Attenborough.
- 1973: Sir Gawain and the Green Knight was filmed at Cardiff Castle, Caerphilly Castle and Castle Coch, directed by Stephen Weeks.
- 1975: Monty Python and the Holy Grail had opening scenes filmed at Kidwelly Castle. Directed by Terry Jones and Terry Gilliam.
- 1977: Jabberwocky was filmed at Chepstow Castle and Pembroke Castle, directed by Terry Gilliam.
- 1979: Yanks starring Richard Gere was filmed in Llandudno and directed by John Schlesinger.
- 1981: Time Bandits was filmed at St Govan's Chapel near Pembroke. It was directed by Terry Gilliam.
- 1981: Dragonslayer was filmed in Snowdonia and Dolwyddelan Castle. Directed by Matthew Robbins.
- 1981: An American Werewolf in London's early scenes set in Yorkshire were filmed in the Brecon Beacons.
- 1983: The Keep is set in Romania, but was actually shot in Llanberis and Blaenau Ffestiniog in Gwynedd, North Wales.
- 1984: Sword of the Valiant was filmed at Castle Coch and Cardiff Castle, directed by Stephen Weeks.
- 1983: Scenes from the film Champions based on Bob Champion's life were filmed at Chepstow Racecourse and was directed by John Irvin.
- 1985: The Black Cauldron. While animated, the filmmakers filmed background footage inside the slate caverns in Snowdonia. Directed by Richard Rich, Ted Berman. Also based on Welsh mythology.
- 1987: Hearts of Fire was filmed at Porthcawl and Southerndown starring Bob Dylan and Fiona it was directed by Richard Marquand.
- 1987: Bloody New Year was filmed at Barry Island directed by Norman J. Warren.
- 1988: Willow, filmed in Dinorwic Quarry (the Willow TV series is also filmed in Wales, at Dragon International Film Studios near Llanharan, Tenby, Saundersfoot, and Pendine Sands.
- 1990: Hardware was filmed at Port Talbot Steelworks, directed by Richard Stanley.
- 1991: Robin Hood starring Patrick Bergin and Uma Thurman was filmed at Betws-y-Coed and directed by John Irvin.
- 1991: Under Suspicion was filmed at Portmeirion starring Liam Neeson; directed by Simon Moore.
- 1991: A Kiss Before Dying; opening scenes were filmed at Port Talbot Steelworks; directed by James Dearden.
- 1991: The Little Engine That Could
- 1992: The Princess and the Goblin was the first animated featured produced in Wales. It was jointly a Hungarian animated film.
- 1994: Princess Caraboo was filmed at Barry, directed by Michael Austin.
- 1995: Madagascar Skin was filmed in Pembrokeshire, directed by Chris Newby.
- 1995: Restoration was filmed at Caephilly Castle and Tretower Court; it won 2 Oscars and was directed by Michael Hoffman
- 1995: First Knight starring Sean Connery, Richard Gere and Julia Ormond, was directed by Jerry Zucker. It is the story of King Arthur; filmed in Snowdonia.
- 1996: Intimate Relations was filmed in Abergavenny and directed by Phillip Goodhew.
- 1997: The James Gang was filmed in Cardiff and Swansea; directed by Mick Barker .
- 1997: Part of Mortal Kombat Annihilation was filmed on location at Parys Mountain on the island of Anglesey.
- 1998: Willow was filmed in Dinorwic quarry, Snowdonia and directed by Ron Howard.
- 1998: Hilary and Jackie was filmed in Cilcain and is the story of cellist Jacqueline du Pré, starring Emily Watson and Rachel Griffith it was directed by Anand Tucker.
- 1998: The Theory of Flight was filmed around Merthyr Tydfil, directed by Paul Greengrass.
- 1998: Up 'n' Under was filmed in Stradey Park and Cardiff, directed by John Godber.
- 1999: The World is Not Enough was filmed at the Cwm Dyli Pipeline, Snowdonia. Directed by Michael Apted.
- 2000: Rancid Aluminium was filmed in Cardiff, directed by Edward Thomas.
- 2000: The Miracle Maker, an animated film starring Ralph Fiennes (English version) and Ioan Gruffudd (Welsh version) as Jesus, was filmed in Cardiff, Wales. It was directed by Derek W. Hayes and Stanislav Sokolov.
- 2001: Just Visiting, starring Jean Reno and directed by Jean-Marie Gabbert, was filmed at Raglan Castle.
- 2002: Die Another Day was filmed at Holywell Bay and Penrhyn Beach directed by Lee Tamahori.
- 2006: Half Light, starring Demi Moore and directed by Craig Rosenberg, is set in Scotland but was shot on location in Wales.
- 2003: Lara Croft Tomb Raider: The Cradle of Life, starring Angelina Jolie as Lara Croft, was shot on location in the mountains of Snowdonia but set in China.
- 2003: I Capture the Castle was filmed at Manobier Castle, Tenby directed by Tim Fywell.
- 2003: I'll Sleep When I'm Dead was filmed at fishguard harbour and stumble head lighthouse, directed by Mike Hodges.
- 2004: The I Inside was filmed in Sully Hospital, Cardiff. Directed by Ronald Richter.
- 2004: The Libertine was filmed at Tretower Court starring Johnny Deppit was the story of the Earl of Rochester, directed by Laurence Dunmore.
- 2004: King Arthur was filmed at Llanddeusant near Carmarthen starring Clive Owen and Keira Knightley; directed by Antoine Fuqua.
- 2005: The Truth About Love was filmed at Cardiff train station starring Jennifer love Hewitt and directed by, John Hay.
- 2005: Separate Lies was filmed at Llandudno and directed by Julian Fellowes .
- 2005: Heidi was filmed at Stradey Castle in Pwll, Llanelli directed by Paul Marcus.
- 2005: The Hitchhicker's Guide to the Galaxy was filmed at Trefil Quarries and directed by Gareth Jennings.
- 2006: Big Nothing was filmed in Cardiff and directed by Jean-Baptiste Andrea.
- 2007: 28 Weeks Later was filmed in Cardiff the Millennium Stadium doubling for London directed by Juan Carlos Fresnadillo.
- 2007: Outlaw was filmed in Cardiff directed by Nick Love.
- 2007: Stardust was filmed at Llyn y Fan Fawr in the Brecon Beacons it was directed by Matthew Vaughn.
- 2007: Nightwatching was filmed at Dryslwn and Llandeilo, Towy Valley, directed by Peter Greenaway.
- 2008: Quantum of Solace location shots were filmed in Snowdonia directed by Marc Forster.
- 2008: Stone of Destiny was filmed in Cardiff's Pinewood Studios directed by Charles Martin Smith.
- 2008: Freebird was filmed in the Brecon Beacons directed by John Ivay.
- 2008: Colin was filmed in Cardiff on a budget of £45, directed by Marc Price.
- 2010: Made in Dagenham was filmed at The Hoover Factory, Pentrebach directed by Nigel Cole.
- 2010: Harry Potter and the Deathly Hallows – Part 1 was filmed in Freshwater West directed by David Yates.
- 2010: Mr. Nice was filmed in Haverfordwest and Cardiff is the story of Howard Marks, directed by Bernard Rose.
- 2010: Robin Hood was filmed at Freshwater West, Pembroke and starred Russell crowe and Cate Blanchett it was directed by Ridley Scott.
- 2010: Clash of the Titans was filmed at Dinorwic quarry and Newborough Forest. It was directed by Louis Leterrier.
- 2010: Third Star was filmed at Barafundle Bay in Pembroke, directed by Hattie Dalton.
- 2011: Hunky Dory was filmed in Swansea, directed by Marc Evans.
- 2011: Killer Elite was filmed in the Brecon Beacons and Windsor Place, Cardiff starring Robert De Niro, and Jason Stratham, directed by Gary McKendry.
- 2011: Captain America: The First Avenger was filmed at Caerwent, directed by Joe Johnson.
- 2011: Retreat was filmed at Plas, Llandecwyn and directed by Carl Tibbetts.
- 2011: Ironclad was the first film to be shot at Dragon International Film Studios in Llanilid.
- 2011: Panic Button was filmed in Cardiff Airport, directed by Chris Crow.
- 2011: Night of the Living Dead: Resurrection was filmed in Cardiff, Swansea, and Carmarthen. It was directed by James Plumb.
- 2012: The Dark Knight Rises was filmed at Hendryd Falls, which is the final scene and entrance to the cave directed by Christopher Nolan.
- 2012: The Reverend was filmed in south Wales and directed by Neil Jones.
- 2012: Wrath of the Titans was filmed in Trefil Quarries directed by Johnathan Liebesman.
- 2012: Snow White and the Huntsman was filmed at Marloes Sands and directed by Robert Sanders.
- 2012: Elfie Hopkins was filmed in Ceredigion North of Carmarthen starring Ray winstone and his daughter Jaime it was directed by Ryan Andrews.
- 2012: Nativity 2: Danger in the Manger was filmed at Lake Vyrnwy, Bala and Pistyll Rhaeadr waterfall, directed by Debbie Isitt.
- 2013: World War Z was filmed in Blaenau Ffestiniog and Cardiff starring Brad Pitt, directed by Marc Forster.
- 2013: One Chance was filmed in Port Talbot and Porthcawl starring James Corden it is the story of Paul Potts, directed by David Frankel.
- 2013: How I Live Now was filmed at Cardiff Airport, Llandovery and Carmarthen, directed by Kevin Macdonald.
- 2013: Svengali was filmed in the Cymoedd De Cymru, directed by John Hardwick.
- 2013: Saint Dracula 3D (Dracula, Lord Of The Damned) was filmed at Gwrych Castle, Abergele; directed by Rupesh Paul.
- 2013: The Machine was filmed in Cardiff and directed by Caradog James.
- 2013: The Amityville Asylum was filmed in Cardiff and directed by Andrew Jones.
- 2013: Dead of the Nite was filmed at Craig-y-Nos Castle, Cardiff and Fonmon Castle it was directed by S J Evans.
- 2013: Convenience, comedy directed by Keri Collins starring Ray Panthaki, Adeel Akhtar, Vicky McClure also Anthony Head and Verne Troyer. Convenience store robbers mess up, filmed at a petrol station in Gorseinon, South Wales
- 2014: Mr Turner was filmed near Llangollen and directed by Mike Leigh.
- 2014: Blackwood a traditional ghost story filmed in Wales and directed by Adam Wimpenny.
- 2015: Narcopolis was filmed in Swansea which doubled for New York and directed by Justin Trefgarne.
- 2015: The Man from U.N.C.L.E. (film) was filmed in Ponterwyd, Cambrian Mountains near Aberystwyth; directed by Guy Ritchie.
- 2015: Suffragette was filmed in Ruthin where the old prison doubled for Holloway; directed by Sarah Gavron.
- 2015: Mr Calzaghe is the story of the boxer Joe Calzaghe filmed in Blackwood and Port Talbot, directed by Vaughan Sivell.
- 2015: The Bad Education Movie was filmed in Pembroke Castle which doubled for Cornwall, directed by Elliott Hegarty.
- 2015: Burn Burn Burn was filmed in the Rhonda Valleyand directed by Chanya Button.
- 2015: Up All Night was filmed in Swansea and Marham Park, directed by John Henderson.
- 2016: Their Finest was filmed at Swansea Guildhall, directed by Lone Scherfig.
- 2016: Tarzan was filmed at the Dinorwig Slate Quarry, directed by David Yates.
- 2016: Me Before You was filmed in Pembroke Castle, directed by Thea Sharrock.
- 2016: Criminal was filmed in RAF St Athan, Cardiff. Starring Kevin Costner, it was directed by Ariel Vromen.
- 2016: Prevenge was filmed in Cardiff and Pembrokeshire, directed by Alice Lowe.
- 2016: The Chamber was filmed in Swansea and Pencoed, directed by Ben Parker.
- 2016: Don't Knock Twice was filmed in Cardiff, directed by Caradog James.
- 2017: Journeys End was filmed in Pinewood Studio, Cardiff and directed by Saul Dibb.
- 2017: Transformers The Last Knight was filmed at Ystrad quarry Blaenau Gwent where they filmed some of the battle scenes, directed by Michael Bay.
- 2017: King Arthur: Legend of the Sword was filmed in Snowdonia at Vivian Quarry, Nant Gwynant and Capel Curig, directed by Guy Ritchie.
- 2017: Kingsman: The Golden Circle was filmed in Cardiff. Directed by Matthew Vaughn.
- 2017: Granny of The Dead was filmed in Cardiff and directed by Craig Tudor.
- 2017: By Any Name was filmed in the Brecon Beacons and directed by Euros Jones-Evans.
- 2018: Show Dogs was filmed in Cardiff, directed by Raja Gosnell.
- 2018: Jurassic World: Fallen Kingdom was filmed in the Brecon Beacons and directed by J.A. Bayona.
- 2019: Dream Horse (released 2020) was filmed at Blaenavon and directed by Euros Lyn.
- 2020: The Voyage of Doctor Dolittle was filmed at the Menai Suspension Bridge starring Robert Downey Jr., directed by Stephen Gaghan.
- 2020: The Secret Garden was filmed in Bodnant Garden and directed by Marc Munden.
- 2020: Six Minutes to Midnight was filmed at Knab Rock, Mumbles, Swansea, as well as Llansteffan and Llandudno; starring Judi Dench and directed by Andy Goddard.
- 2020: Wonder Woman 1984, directed by Patty Jenkins, was filmed at Betws-y-Coed by Swallow Falls.
- 2025: Havoc (2025 film), written and directed by Welsh filmmaker Gareth Evans (filmmaker). Despite being set in the U.S., it was filmed entirely in Wales.
- 2026: Werwulf, partially filmed in Wales.

=== Miscellaneous ===
- 1967: In Bedazzled, when Dudley Moore's character wishes for intellectualism, he develops a Welsh accent.
- 1968: In the film Barbarella, a few characters use Llanfairpwllgwyngyllgogerychwyrndrobwllllantysiliogogogoch as a password.
- 1971: In Straw Dogs, directed by Sam Peckinpah, a Cornish vicar uses the Welsh place name Llanfairpwllgwyngyllgogerychwyrndrobwllllantysiliogogogoch as the magic word in a magic trick he performs.
- 1986: In Back to School, directed by Alan Metter, Rodney Dangerfield's character recites "Do not go gentle into that good night" for his oral exam.
- 1986: The mining communities in Castle in the Sky, directed by Hayao Miyazaki, are based on the writer-director's experiences travelling in Wales.
- 1988: In The Adventures of Baron Munchausen, the Vulcan sequence ends with a choir humming Ar Hyd y Nos.
- 1995: In Before Sunrise, directed by Richard Linklater, Ethan Hawke's character mimics Dylan Thomas's voice, reading a fragment from "As I Walked Out One Evening", written by W.H. Auden.
- 2000: The Weight of Water, directed by Kathryn Bigelow, features the Dylan Thomas poem "And death shall have no dominion".
- 2002: The Steven Soderbergh remake of Solaris features the Dylan Thomas poem "And death shall have no dominion"; George Clooney's character reads the first stanza of the poem.
- 2004: Crash features the Welsh-language folk song "Lisa Lân", sung by Carol Ensley.
- 2004: Howl's Moving Castle, dir. Hayao Miyazaki: the film does not provide a clearly defined setting, but the book upon which it is based is partially set in Wales.
- 2013: Inside Llewyn Davis, by the Coen brothers. The main character briefly speaks of the Welsh origins of his name (followed by some commentary on Welsh rarebit by John Goodman's character).
- 2014: Garm Wars: The Last Druid, by Mamoru Oshii. A sci-fi film set on a planet named Annwn; it also as a character called a Druid, and the third act is titled "Sacred Grove."
- 2015: Cinderella (2015 American film): Mentions a Princess Blodwyn of Llanfair PG
- 2019: Saint Maud, written and directed by Rose Glass; the main character speaks Welsh.
- 2022: Autumn in Wales. A Malaysian romantic comedy set in Wales.
- 2025: Sacrifice: Chris Evans's character (mis)quotes Dylan Thomas's Do not go gentle into that good night, to comedic effect.

== See also ==
- Cinema of Wales
- List of Welsh television series

== Scholarly resources ==
- Wales on Screen, edited by Steve Blandford
- Wales and Cinema: The First Hundred Years, by Dave Berry
