= Gwyneth Keyworth =

Welsh actress

- Born: Gwyneth Anjuli Keyworth; 15 September 1990 (age 36); Aberystwyth, Ceredigion, Wales
- Education: Royal Academy of Dramatic Art (BA Hons)
- Occupation: Actress
- Years active: 2008–present

Gwyneth Anjuli Keyworth (born 15 September 1990) is a Welsh actress of stage and screen. She is known for her roles in the TV series The Sarah Jane Adventures, Misfits (2009–2013), The Great Outdoors, and Death Valley (2025).

== Early life and education ==
Gwyneth Anjuli Keyworth was born on 15 September 1990 in Aberystwyth.

She began acting in a local Welsh language youth theatre group and graduated from the Welsh-language, community comprehensive school Ysgol Gyfun Gymunedol Penweddig.

In 2008, she appeared in Sick Room, an ensemble production at the Soho Theatre with the National Youth Theatre. In 2010, Keyworth was recognised as a Screen International Star of Tomorrow.

She graduated from the Royal Academy of Dramatic Art in 2014 with a BA in Acting (Honours).

== Career ==
=== Screen ===
Keyworth is perhaps best known for her roles on British TV programmes, including The Sarah Jane Adventures, Misfits (2009–2013),The Great Outdoors, and Death Valley (2025). She has had film roles, including the 2012 cannibal horror thriller Elfie Hopkins and the 2014 comedy-drama Closer to the Moon.

In 2014, she starred in the Vodka Diaries, in 2015, she played Clea in Season 5 of the HBO series Game of Thrones, and in 2021, appeared in the black comedy The Toll.

=== Stage ===
Keyworth's stage roles include the 2015 Shakespeare's Globe production of Helen Edmundson's The Heresy of Love, and a production of Little Shop of Horrors.

In 2022, she starred in a production of To Kill a Mockingbird at the Gielgud Theatre in London. Her portrayal of Scout led her to winning the Best Supporting Performer in a Play at the 2023 WhatsOnStage Awards.

In 2025, she played Viola in the Royal Shakespeare Company production of Twelfth Night.

She has also appeared in As You Like It at Shakespeare's Globe, The Life and Times of Fanny Hill at the Bristol Old Vic, and Raising Martha at the Park Theatre.

== Personal life ==
Keyworth is neurodivergent having been diagnosed with ADHD around 2024. Due to her undiagnosed ADHD she found school particularly challenging, but discovering that she had ADHD made her feel "so lucky" she found a career in acting. Her diagnosis actually aided her in identifying with the neurodivergent detective Janie Mallowan, the starring role she plays in Death Valley.

== Filmography ==
=== Television ===
Year	Title	Role	Notes
2009	Framed	Marie Huges	TV film
2010	Royal Wedding	Tammy Craddock	TV film
2010	The Great Outdoors	Hazel Stephens	3 episodes
2010	The Sarah Jane Adventures	Emily Morris	2 episodes: "Lost in Time: Parts 1 & 2"
2010–2011	Misfits	Marnie	2 episodes (including internet mini-episode "Vegas Baby!")
2011	Midsomer Murders	Bethan	Episode: "Death in the Slow Lane"
2011	Case Histories	Reggie Teague	2 episodes: "When Will There Be Good News: Parts 1 & 2"
2012	Loserville	Laura	TV film
2014	Vodka Diaries	Periel	One of the comedies in the BBC Comedy Feeds TV series
2014	The Suspicions of Mr Whicher: The Ties That Bind	Emma Finch	TV film
2015	Game of Thrones	Clea	Episode: "High Sparrow"
2016	Doctor Thorne	Lady Augusta Gresham	3 episodes
2016	Plebs	Agatha	Episode: "The Crime Wave"
2016	Power Monkeys	Jackie	TV mini-series. Main role
2016	Wasted	Alison	Main role
2016	Y Gwyll / Hinterland	Beca Jones	Series 3, episode 1
2017	Bang	Ela	4 episodes
2017	Black Mirror	Nicola	Episode: "Hang the DJ"
2018	Craith / Hidden	Megan Ruddock	8 episodes
2018–2019	Defending the Guilty	Danielle	7 episodes
2019	The Crown	Gwen Edwards	Season 3, episode 3 "Aberfan"
2020	The Trouble with Maggie Cole	Becka Cole	6 episodes
2021	Alex Rider	Evelyn Anders	6 episodes
2024	Lost Boys and Fairies	Becky	3 episodes
2025–2026	Death Valley	Janie Mallowan	Lead role

=== Film ===
Year	Title	Role	Notes
2010	Copier	Stacey	Short. Directed by Jessica Levick.
2010	Jerusalem	Angel	Short. Directed by Ryan Andrews.
2011	Little Munchkin	Margaret	Short. Directed by Ryan Andrews.
2012	Elfie Hopkins	Ruby Gammon	Directed by Ryan Andrews.
2014	Closer to the Moon	Lidia	Directed by Nae Caranfil.
2014	7.2	Mar	Short. Directed by Nida Manzoor.
2017	The Master of York	Chana	Short. Directed by Kieron Quirke.
2021	Contraband	Ruby	Short. Directed by Anabel Barnston.
2021	The Toll	The Triplets	Welsh black comedy crime film. Directed by Ryan Andrew Hooper
2022	Safe Word	Girl	Short. Directed by Ellie Heydon.
2024	Satisfaction	Verity	Short. Directed by Tom Bailey.

== Awards and nominations ==
- 2018 BAFTA Cymru Award – Best Actress (Yr Actores Orau): Nomination
- 2023 WhatsOnStage Award – Best Supporting Performer in a Play
- 2025 BAFTA Cymru Award – Best Actress (Yr Actores Orau): Nomination
