= Caryl Lewis =

Welsh novelist

- Born: 7 July 1978 (age 48); Wales
- Known for: novelist

Caryl Lewis (born 7 July 1978) is a Welsh novelist. She won the Wales Book of the Year in 2005 with her novel Martha Jac a Sianco, which was adapted into a film in 2008.

== Biography ==
Lewis was brought up in Aberaeron until she was 12. Then she went to live on the family farm in Dihewyd, 5 mi (8.0 km) away. She got her initial education in Aberaeron Primary School and Aberaeron Comprehensive School. Lewis attended college both at Durham University and Aberystwyth University. She then began work at Tŷ Newydd, the National Writing Centre of Wales, and for the Welsh Academy. Lewis also worked in public relations as a writer.

Lewis published her first novel in 2003 and it won the 2004 Tir na n-Og Award. She became better known when her novel Martha, Jac a Sianco won the Wales Book of the Year award in 2005. Her tenth novel Y Bwthyn won in 2016 and Y Gwreiddyn was shortlisted for Welsh Book of the Year Award 2017. Martha, Jac a Sianco was adapted for film which won the Atlantis Prize at the 2009 Moondance Festival in Colorado. Lewis has also written for television, including Hinterland and Hidden. Lewis now lives on the outskirts of Aberystwyth.

Lewis's first English-language novel, Drift (2022), won the overall Wales Book of the Year 2023 (English language), making Lewis the first author to have won the overall awards in both language categories.

== Bibliography ==
Bili Boncyrs

- Bili Boncyrs a'r Pants Hud, Cyfres y Teulu Boncyrs (Y Lolfa, 2004)
- Bili Boncyrs a'r Cynllun Hedfan, Cyfres y Teulu Boncyrs (Y Lolfa, 2004)
- Bili Boncyrs: Seren y Rodeo, Cyfres y Teulu Boncyrs (Y Lolfa, 2005)
- Bili Boncyrs a'r Gêm Bêl-droed, Cyfres y Teulu Boncyrs (Y Lolfa, 2006)
- Bili Boncyrs a'r Planedau, Cyfres y Teulu Boncyrs (Y Lolfa, 2007)
- Bili Boncyrs ar y Fferm, Cyfres y Teulu Boncyrs (Y Lolfa, 2007)

Others

- Dal Hi! (Y Lolfa, 2003)
- Iawn Boi? ;-), Cyfres Pen Dafad (Y Lolfa, 2003)
- Tric y Pic a Mics, Llyfrau Lloerig (Gwasg Gwynedd, 2004)
- Martha, Jac a Sianco (Y Lolfa, 2004)
- Drws Arall i'r Coed, gyda Gwyneth Glyn Evans, Eurgain Haf Evans, Dyfrig Jones, a Manon Wyn (Sherman Cymru, 2005)
- Drws Arall i'r Coed, gyda Gwyneth Glyn Evans, Eurgain Haf Evans, Dyfrig Jones, a Manon Wyn (Sgript Cymru, 2005)
- Sgwbidŵ Aur, Cyfres Pen Dafad (Y Lolfa, 2005)
- Arkies, Dramâu'r Drain (Y Lolfa, 2006)
- Trosiadau / Translations: Gwaliadir / Walesland, gyda Nigel Wells (Gwasg Gomer, 2006)
- Yr Ysbryd, Dramâu'r Drain (Y Lolfa, 2006)
- Ffit-Ffat yr Hwyaden, Cyfres Gwreichion (Gwasg Gomer, 2006)
- Bôrd, Cyfres Lleisiau (Canolfan Astudiaethau Addysg, 2006)
- Ffêc Tan, Rissole a Tships, Cyfres Whap! (Gwasg Gomer, 2006)
- Bôrd Eto, Cyfres Lleisiau (Y Lolfa, 2007)
- Y Rhwyd, Stori Sydyn (Y Lolfa, 2007)
- Y Gemydd (Y Lolfa, 2007)
- Tinboeth, gyda Eigra Lewis Roberts, Meg Elis, Gwen Lasarus, Bethan Gwanas, Lleucu Roberts, Gwyneth Glyn, Siân Northey a Fflur Dafydd (Gwasg Gwynedd, 2007)
- Martha, Jac & Shanco, addasiad Saesneg o Martha, Jac a Sianco (Y Lolfa, 2007)
- Plu (Y Lolfa, 2008)
- Naw Mis (Y Lolfa, 2009)
- Ar Fferm Sgubor Wen (Gwasg Gwynedd, 2013)
- Straeon Gorau'r Byd (Gwasg Carreg Gwalch, 2014)
- Y Bwthyn (Y Lolfa, 2016)
- Y Gwreiddyn (Y Lolfa, 2017)
- Seed (Henry Holt and Co., 2022)
- Drift (Doubleday, 2022)
