= Annika (2021 TV series) =

Scottish crime drama television series

- Genre: Crime drama; Police procedural
- Created by: Nick Walker
- Based on: Annika Stranded
- Directed by: Philip John; Fiona Walton; Annie Griffin
- Starring: Nicola Walker; Jamie Sives; Katie Leung; Ukweli Roach; Kate Dickie; Silvie Furneaux; Paul McGann; Varada Sethu
- Country of origin: Scotland
- Original language: English
- No. of series: 2
- No. of episodes: 12

Production
- Executive producer: Arabella Page Croft
- Producer: Kieran Parker
- Production company: Black Camel Pictures

Original release
- Network: Alibi; U & Drama; BBC One
- Release: 17 August 2021 – 14 September 2023

Annika is a British black comedy crime drama television series, based on the BBC Radio 4 drama Annika Strandhed. (Note: The title changed to Annika Strandhed on BBC website in November 2024.) Produced by Black Camel Pictures for Alibi and All3Media, the first episode aired on 17 August 2021. It was created by Nick Walker and stars Nicola Walker in the title role.

Season 1 of Annika began airing on BBC One on 20 May 2023. Season 2 began airing on Alibi UK on 9 August 2023, and aired from 15 October 2023 on PBS Masterpiece in the United States. The show was cancelled in August 2025.

== Development ==
The character and concept originated as a BBC Radio 4 series, entitled Annika Strandhed, with same writer and lead. The background and setting differed somewhat, with Strandhed working in the Oslo Police homicide unit. The BBC summed up the tone of the show with the observation that "Her neuroses - and she has a few - are mostly hidden by a boisterous manner and a love of motor boats. And she thinks she's funny - although her colleagues aren't so sure."

== Plot ==
Annika Strandhed is the Detective Inspector heading up the newly-formed, Glasgow-based, Marine Homicide Unit (MHU). The relationship between Annika and Morgan, her teenage daughter, is the basis for a sub-plot across all the episodes. Annika regularly breaks the fourth wall to communicate directly with the audience about aspects of the current case and personal reflections. She is of Norwegian ancestry, and often refers to Norwegian culture and folklore.

In the last episode of series 1, Annika reveals to the audience that Michael McAndrews is Morgan's biological father.

In series 2, when Blair announces her pregnancy and Tyrone reveals he will be leaving, Annika puts off telling Michael. Soon after meeting DC Harper Weston (Varada Sethu), she finally tells Michael.

After Tyrone leaves, Harper becomes a part of the team. As the series progresses, Annika and Michael have to work out how and when they are going to tell Morgan about her father, but after Erin dumps her, they decide to wait. In the series Annika rekindles her relationship with Jake; however, Annika's father arrives and as she begins to build a few bridges with him, Morgan suddenly asks if Michael is her dad.

== Cast and characters ==
- Nicola Walker as DI Annika Strandhed

Strandhed is the lead of the new Marine Homicide Unit (MHU). She is very invested in her job while trying to maintain a good relationship with her daughter Morgan. Her Norwegian ancestry and connections continue to influence her thoughts and emotions, though she is now in Scotland. She and DS McAndrews were in police college at the same time but haven't seen each other for years. Walker's character "breaks the 4th wall" she directly addresses the camera. [[Category:Fictional characters who break the fourth wall]]

- Jamie Sives as DS Michael McAndrews, Annika's second in command

McAndrews is a senior member of the MHU who lost out to Annika as the lead for the unit and harbours the belief that he is still the best to lead the unit. He views Annika as a smart but prickly individual to deal with. He is the team's search diver. It is revealed in series 2 that he is Morgan's biological father.

- Katie Leung as DC Blair Ferguson, Data and technical investigator

Ferguson is the analyst dealing with the data and technical support for the team. As she is the youngest member of the team, Annika often asks her perspective about something involving Morgan. In series 2, Leung's real life pregnancy is brought into the story.

- Ukweli Roach as DS Tyrone Clarke, a former unit member

Clarke has recently been transferred from the Border Command, a police drug investigation unit, to try to reboot his career. He is very goal focused and used to working alone, which clashes with the team environment Annika is trying to foster with the MHU. He leaves in the third episode of series 2.

- Varada Sethu as DS Harper Weston (Series 2), the latest unit member

Harper joins the team after Tyrone leaves; she is slowly being trained up and has a motorbike, which Annika isn't keen on when she has to ride it with her.

- Kate Dickie as DCI Diane Oban, Annika's boss

Diane is the head of the Marine Homicide Unit (MHU). She also sometimes gets involved in the cases. Annika says she can be a bit bossy. In series 2, after Annika's car gets blown up, Diane lets Annika use her car for a time.

- Silvie Furneaux as Morgan, Annika's teenage daughter.

She is regularly in conflict with her mother on various issues, and her mother cannot see the teenager's perspective. The girl has a relationship with Blair's sister Erin, who eventually dumps her. She learns who her father is.

- Paul McGann as Jake Strathearn, a child therapist and Annika's partner.

After Morgan's first therapy session, Annika develops feelings for Jake. They both want to be together, but only if Morgan stops using him as a therapist (which she does). They later have a brief relationship, but eventually they decide to wait until Morgan is ready. In series 2, they rekindle their relationship.

- Sven Henriksen as Magnus Strandhed, Annika's father, with whom she has a strained relationship (series 2).

== Episodes ==
=== Series 1 ===
No.	Title	Directed by	Written by	Alibi	BBC	U.K. viewers (millions)
1	"Captain Ahab's Wife"	Phillip John	Nick Walker	17 August 2021	20 May 2023	1.66 (Alibi) 3.37 (BBC One)
Annika begins leading a new Marine Homicide Unit and her teenage daughter (Morgan) starts at a new school. The Coast Guard finds a body in the Clyde, killed with a harpoon. The murder victim is the owner of a boat which takes tourists on whale hunts. The only suspect is killed in a hit-and-run road accident. Meanwhile, Morgan struggles to fit in and distracts her mother from the case. The episode ends with Annika questioning her parenting skills and, as a single parent, compares herself to Captain Ahab's wife.
2	"Wild Valkyrie Ride"	Phillip John	Nick Walker	24 August 2021	27 May 2023	1.24 (Alibi) 2.99 (BBC)
A murder victim is found surrounded by stones with Norse runes on a drifting boat. Annika narrowly escapes death when the boat is intentionally blown up. Clues lead the MHU to a small island village. The seemingly idyllic village has Annika wondering if it would be a better environment to raise Morgan. But then it is revealed that the murder victim, a local teacher, had been having an affair with one of his pupils who was legally under-age.
3	"Enemy of the People"	Phillip John	Nick Walker	31 August 2021	3 June 2023	1.09 (Alibi) 3.02 (BBC)
Annika sees one of playwright Ibsen's plots play out in a homicide because the body is found floating in a reservoir. The victim's horrible behaviour while alive adds confusion to the case. Annika takes more than a parental interest in Morgan's therapist Jake.
4	"Building Bridges"	Fiona Walton	Lucia Haynes	7 September 2021	10 June 2023	0.92 (Alibi) 2.71 (BBC)
An author who antagonized many people with her books is found murdered and the MHU must work through a list of suspects who all have something to hide. Blair finds a friend for Morgan - her sister Erin, and a relationship starts blossoming quickly. A museum exhibit tour by Annika and Jake is viewed by Morgan as a thin pretext since Jake is no longer her therapist. This causes a romance for Annika and Jake to blossom. Bridges provide an analogy throughout the episode.
5	"Greek Tragedy"	Fiona Walton	Frances Poet	14 September 2021	17 June 2023	0.92 (Alibi) 2.80 (BBC)
A man's body is found thrown overboard from a party boat after having been tortured. Relationships develop for Annika, Jake, Morgan and Erin.
6	"Close To Home"	Fiona Walton	Nick Walker	21 September 2021	17 June 2023	0.98 (Alibi) 2.59 (BBC)
A murdered woman was closely involved with DS Michael McAndrews and his brother Adie, so Annika instructs Michael to step back from the case. Morgan turns 16, and Annika breaks the "fourth wall" to give the audience a clue about the identity of Morgan's father.

=== Series 2 ===
No.	Title	Directed by	Written by	Original release date	UK viewers (millions)
1	"A Song of Scottish Seals"	Philip John	Nick Walker	9 August 2023	N/A
When a phone with a brutal drowning recorded on it is handed in to MHU headquarters, the pressure is on for Annika and the team to track down the murderer. The footage leads them to a businessman who ordered a hit on the drowned person through a taxi driver. The MHU bring him into a money transfer where they attempt to detain the hit man, but the businessman attempts to flee, which fails before he can achieve proper distance. Meanwhile, she struggles to find the opportunity to share a deep secret with Michael that could change his life and their relationship forever, and Blair reveals to her and Tyrone that she is pregnant.
2	"Waverley, or 'Tis Sixty Years Since"	Philip John	Nick Walker	16 August 2023	N/A
When a newly-released prisoner is found dead in a dog cage under the Forth Rail Bridge, the team are sent to Edinburgh to find her killer. Assisted by the astute and witty DC Harper Weston, the team trace the victim's last activities through the city. As the case unfolds, Annika reflects on punishments in the Edinburgh novel Waverley and realises that the victim's conviction may be more central to her death than they initially thought. They learn that the victim had been involved in a hit-and-run, and often got off wrongly with other people in her circle. She had also borrowed money from a friend in the art world, who they learn had accidentally sent her tumbling down some stairs and put in her the cage that she was found in. Annika also shares with Michael a truth she has been hiding for years.
3	"The Strange Case of Dr. Jekyll and Mr. Hyde"	Philip John	Lucia Haynes	23 August 2023	N/A
Michael has taken two weeks off to process the news and the team investigate the death of Scottish millionaire and entrepreneur Fabian Hyde after he's found in his own shark tank, leading Annika to reflect on Jekyll and Hyde. Tyrone makes his goodbyes, preparing to start in his new job. Michael and Annika agree to tell Morgan about him being her father, but when she steals Annika's boat, they have to rescue her and her friends, causing them to postpone telling her. Annika decides to ground Morgan, who also reveals that Erin dumped her.
4	"1984"	Annie Griffin	Frances Poet	30 August 2023	N/A
Annika and Michael are flown to the Hebridean islands and assisted by DC Harper Weston to investigate the death of a man found in a block of ice. Annika uses 1984 to solve the case, deducing how fear in comparison, also played a factor in the man's murder. She leaves Morgan home alone to regain her trust but wants to go to a camp site to do her work experience. Whilst on the investigation she reunites with Jake and the two rekindle their relationship but when they return together Annika and Jake are shocked to see her father.
5	"King Lear"	Annie Griffin	Nick Walker	7 September 2023	N/A
When Morgan starts working at a remote Scottish eco-resort, Annika visits on a mini break to support her daughter to which her father tags along. However, her holiday is interrupted when a local builder employed by the resort turns up dead in a nearby stream. The investigation leads the team to how the builder treated other people, which touched a nerve with the local seaplane pilot, whose father was an RAF pilot, which he felt the builder disrespected. Annika discovers that her father has left her mother, with which she is not impressed, and he is now seeking her advice on how to handle the situation.
6	"The Truth Will Surface"	Annie Griffin	Nick Walker	14 September 2023	N/A
A brutal murder on Glasgow's canals hits close to home when the victim is identified as a former police detective, but when Blair goes into labour Annika, Harper and Michael must go into the investigation alone. Morgan is nervous about a test that will qualify her to start getting her license and discovers that Michael is her father. Jake tells Annika he loves her, and has proposed moving in with her to which she agrees. Annika's father decides to go home to save his marriage but it is later discovered by Annika that he may be involved in the detective's murder.

== Production and filming ==
The original radio series, Annika Stranded, also written by Nick Walker and featuring Nicola Walker, was set in Oslo. The television series relocates the action to Glasgow, while retaining Norwegian themes.

Principal photography for the series began on 14 December 2020 and ended on 2 April 2021. Filming took place primarily in Glasgow, on the River Clyde, as well as in towns in Argyll. Beacon Arts Centre, Greenock, served as the homicide unit's base, and DI Strandhed's home was located on the banks of Loch Lomond.

In August 2022, it was confirmed that a second series had been commissioned. In August 2025, it was reported that "there are no current plans for a third series" at UKTV.

=== Music ===
The theme music ("Bringing Murder to the Land") was written by Anton Newcombe and Dot Allison.

== Reception ==
=== Critical response ===
In The Guardian, the opening episode of the TV series holds a 4-star review. "She's a daffy Norwegian supercop with a dodgy accent. But Walker’s droll dialogue and womansplaining should keep you waterside for the long haul". The Radio Times rated the same episode with 3 stars: "Not everything works in the first episode of the crime drama – but the central case is gripping enough". The Killing Times also rated the first episode with 3 stars: "It's great to have Walker back on our screens and although Annika feels a bit light – Mare of Easttown it is most assuredly not – it's still worth a watch".

The Daily Telegraph describes the TV series as "disappointingly pedestrian", recommending that "The show needs to focus less on the clever conceits and more on the plots".

=== Ratings ===
Annika has broken records to become Alibi's most-watched drama for at least seven years. The first episode of the series attracted 410,000 viewers – 2.5 per cent of the audience share, making it the highest-rated programme since the Broadcasters' Audience Research Board started recording figures in January 2014.
