= Wolf (British TV series) =

British television miniseries

- Genre: Crime thriller
- Created by: Megan Gallagher
- Based on: The Jack Caffery series by Mo Hayder
- Written by: Megan Gallagher
- Directed by: Lee Haven Jones; Kristoffer Nyholm
- Starring: Ukweli Roach; Iwan Rheon; Sacha Dhawan; Juliet Stevenson; Owen Teale
- Composer: Chris Roe
- Country of origin: United Kingdom
- Original language: English
- No. of series: 1
- No. of episodes: 6

Production
- Executive producers: Elaine Cameron; Laurent Boissel; Ben Irving
- Producer: Nikki Wilson
- Cinematography: Rasmus Arrildt; Sam Heasman
- Editors: David Fisher; Joel Skinner
- Production companies: Hartswood Films; APC Studios

Original release
- Network: BBC One
- Release: 31 July – 15 August 2023

Wolf is a six-part British television miniseries, based on the Jack Caffery novels by Mo Hayder. It was made for BBC One and BBC Wales. Wolf began airing on BBC One, BBC Wales and BBC iPlayer on 31 July 2023.

== Synopsis ==
DI Jack Caffery becomes obsessed with the neighbour he believes murdered his 10-year-old brother during the 1990s. Meanwhile, in Monmouthshire a wealthy isolated family find themselves victimised, trapped and terrorised by someone’s cruel games.

== Cast ==
- Ukweli Roach as DI Jack Caffrey
- Iwan Rheon as Molina
- Sacha Dhawan as Honey
- Sian Reese-Williams as DI Maia Lincoln
- Juliet Stevenson as Matilda Anchor-Ferrers
- Owen Teale as Oliver Anchor-Ferrers
- Annes Elwy as Lucia Anchor-Ferrers
- Ciarán Joyce as DI Prody
- Emily Adara as Sophie
- Zadeiah Campbell-Davies as Emily
- Amanda Drew as Supt Harper Driscoll

== Production ==
The series is based on Mo Hayder's Jack Caffery novels. It was written and adapted by Megan Gallagher and produced by Hartswood Films and APC Studios. The production was funded through Creative Wales and BBC Wales. Kristoffer Nyholm directed the first three episodes, with Lee Haven Jones directing the final three. Executive producers were Elaine Cameron for Hartswood Films, Laurent Boissel for APC Studios and Ben Irving for the BBC.

=== Filming ===
Filming began in March 2022 in Monmouthshire and in Cardiff. First look images from the series were released in February 2023. The rave scenes were filmed in Neath Abbey. Other filming locations included Penarth, Pontyclun, and Ewenny Priory in Bridgend.

== Episodes ==
No.	Title	Directed by	Written by	Original release date	U.K. viewers (millions)
1	"Watching"	Kristoffer Nyholm	Megan Gallagher	31 July 2023	4.21
2	"Torture"	Kristoffer Nyholm	Megan Gallagher	1 August 2023	3.18
3	"Scary Man"	Kristoffer Nyholm	Megan Gallagher	7 August 2023	2.83
4	"Night Terror"	Lee Haven Jones	Megan Gallagher	8 August 2023	2.94
5	"Death Roll"	Lee Haven Jones	Megan Gallagher	14 August 2023	2.93
6	"Knock Knock"	Lee Haven Jones	Megan Gallagher	15 August 2023	3.01

== Reception ==
Lucy Mangan of The Guardian awarded the first episode four stars out of five, praising the performances and unpredictable narrative. Sean O'Grady of The Independent also gave it four stars.
