= Eternal Law =

British television series (2012)

- Genre: Fantasy drama
- Created by: Ashley Pharoah; Matthew Graham
- Starring: Samuel West; Orla Brady; Ukweli Roach
- Composer: Ben Bartlett
- Country of origin: United Kingdom
- Original language: English
- No. of series: 1
- No. of episodes: 6 (list of episodes)

Production
- Executive producers: Ashley Pharoah and Matthew Graham (Monastic); Jane Featherstone and Alison Jackson (Kudos)
- Producer: Georgina Lowe
- Production locations: York, England
- Cinematography: Tony Slater-Ling
- Running time: 45–50 mins
- Production companies: Kudos; Monastic

Original release
- Network: ITV
- Release: 5 January – 9 February 2012

Eternal Law is a 2012 ITV fantasy drama series created by Ashley Pharoah and Matthew Graham. The show stars Samuel West, Ukweli Roach, Orla Brady, Tobias Menzies and Hattie Morahan. Set in York, it is centred on two angels sent to Earth to assist in court cases. The first episode premiered on 5 January 2012. The show was cancelled after one series due to low ratings.

== Plot ==
Mr Mountjoy (God, spoken of but never seen) sends two wing-bearing angels to Earth to help humans with their problems. Humans cannot see the angels' wings except in exceptional circumstances, such as being close to death. Zak Gist (Samuel West) is an experienced angel, 14 billion years old (episode six), who has been to Earth before. Tom Greening (Ukweli Roach) is an angel still learning the ways of humans. It is decided that the pair can best help humans as barristers in York, England. In York, they are met by Mrs Sheringham (Orla Brady), an angel who became mortal to marry Billy, a human, but, was widowed; she arranges offices and accommodation with her at The Belfry. She kept her old pair of wings in a trunk before throwing them into a river during the series. In court they cross paths with a fallen angel, Richard Pembroke (Tobias Menzies), who is also a barrister, usually prosecuting. In episode six, Richard's wings are seen: they are black. Zak also meets Hannah English, a woman with whom he is in love from one of his past visits to Earth, but who does not recognise him.

The prime rule for the angels is non-interference in the free will of humanity. The angels are allowed to guide and comfort, but have powers to influence the human mind, which they must resist the temptation to use. Mr Mountjoy, bothered by the number of angels choosing to interfere and the number of angels choosing to become mortal, may decide to remove all angelic guidance and comfort if Zak or Tom stray from the rules. Zak believes this would eventually spell doom for humans.

== Production notes ==
The series was primarily filmed in the York, mainly in and around York Minster, where the angels congregate. The location used to portray York Hospital in the series is York Crown Court, while a former private hospital Purey-Cust Lodge provides the location for Jerusalem Chambers. Mansion House serves as the location of the Crown Court in the series. Other York locations include Low Petergate, Stonegate, St Helen's Square, Gray's Court and St William's College.

Filming was also done in other areas of Yorkshire such as Leeds, Wakefield, Kirklees, Selby and Richmondshire. Dewsbury Town Hall's foyers, corridors and court rooms were also used for filming.

== Cast and characters ==
- Samuel West as angel Zak Gist
- Ukweli Roach as angel Thomas Greening
- Tobias Menzies as fallen angel Richard Pembroke
- Orla Brady as former angel Mrs Sherringham
- Hattie Morahan as Hannah English

== Episode list ==
No.	Title	Directed by	Written by	Original release date	Viewing Figures (millions) Source: BARB; includes ITV1 HD & ITV1 +1
1	"Episode One"	Adrian Shergold	Ashley Pharoah	5 January 2012	5.43 (Note: 4.54 million on ITV1, 427,000 on the ITV1 HD simulcast, and 458,000 on ITV1+1.)
Angels Zak and Tom are plunged into a court case involving an estranged family and a newlywed after a sniper shoots at the wedding party at a market, critically injuring Zak's old flame Hannah. The shooter is captured by Tom and admits to committing the crime. Tom and Zak defend the man despite the confession. The prosecutor is Zak's arch-enemy, fallen angel Richard.
2	"Episode Two"	Adrian Shergold	Ashley Pharoah	12 January 2012	3.86
A six-year-old boy, who recognises Zak and Tom as angels, asks Zak to intervene for his father in a custody battle between his adoptive parents in the hope he can reconcile them. Zak and Tom find themselves facing Hannah and Richard, representing the mother, when the case goes to court. Mrs. Sherringham tells Tom how she fell for Billy and asked Mr. Mountjoy to make her mortal. A mysterious package from Mr. Mountjoy arrives at the Belfry, containing the Kremlin's Doomsday Clock, which once counted down during the Cuban Missile Crisis.
3	"Episode Three"	Jamie Payne	Matthew Graham	19 January 2012	3.78
Pensioner Mack Steen admits to poisoning heartless care home owner Keith Cedric because he is closing the care home. Zak and Tom defend Mack but the past histories of all involved makes it very difficult when fallen angel Richard wants the charge increased from assault to attempted murder.
4	"Episode Four"	Jamie Payne	Matthew Graham	26 January 2012	3.58
Zak and Tom prosecute a woman for the manslaughter of a prowler, who had been stalking her and who she believed had killed her son. Tom has severe doubts about the woman's guilt and, goaded by Richard, has his own doubts about his reason on earth. Tom, wanting to comfort the woman who is grieving over her son, reveals himself as an angel, thus proving the existence of Heaven; this ends up causing her to commit suicide to be with her son. When Zak and Hannah go on an outing ("...it's not a date"), Mr. Mountjoy activates a light on the Doomsday Clock at the Belfry.
5	"Episode Five"	Adrian Shergold	Ashley Pharoah	2 February 2012	2.93 (overnight)
Tom saves a female soldier's life who then is accused of desertion and faces a court martial. Zak asks Hannah to assist in defending the soldier, much to Tom's chagrin. Mrs. Sherringham's memories of her own love of Billy and its consequences tells Zak to arrange a date for Hannah with another man, while Richard is working his evil in the background when Billy's brother Carl turns up.
6	"Episode Six"	Adrian Shergold	Matthew Graham	9 February 2012	3.20
The extent of fallen angel Richard's manipulations are fully revealed. He creates conflict between two brothers when one of them is falsely accused of killing a third brother. He admits to bringing Hannah to York in order to tempt Zak, going so far as to show Zak a life where he and Hannah are happily married with a young daughter. He manipulates the relationship of Mrs. Sherringham and Billy's brother, Carl. When Zak and Hannah kiss, Mr. Mountjoy starts the countdown on the Doomsday Clock, beginning at 666666.

== DVD ==
A region 2 DVD of the first series was released on 12 February 2012.

== See also ==
- List of films about angels
