= Ukweli Roach =

British actor (born 1986)

- Born: September 1986 (age 39); Derby, Derbyshire, England, UK
- Occupations: Actor, dancer, choreographer
- Years active: 2010–present

Ukweli Roach (born September 1986) is a British actor, dancer, and choreographer, best known for playing the role of Jay in StreetDance 3D (2010), FBI psychiatrist Robert Borden, on the American television series Blindspot (2015–2020), and Tyrone Clark on the crime drama series Annika (2021–2022).

== Career ==
Roach's film credits include: Venus & the Sun, StreetDance 3D, Shakespeare's Globe: Romeo and Juliet, StreetDance: The Moves, One Day, Eternal Law. On television, Roach has appeared in Monroe, Starlings, Drifters, Silk, Grantchester, The Royals, Dickensian, Anatole in TV series Humans, Robert Borden, an FBI psychiatrist on Blindspot.

In 2018, Roach starred as Pete in the play Nightfall, which was staged at the Bridge Theatre, London. In 2019, he performed in a London production of Jesus Hopped the 'A' Train, staged at the Young Vic.

In 2021, Roach starred as Tyrone Clark in the Alibi crime drama Annika; On being on the production, Roach shared to Scottish Field: "It was a great chance to play a type of character I had not been asked to portray before. I'd never done a police procedural or been part of a team before, so Annika was a really good challenge for me. It was also a chance to work with an amazing cast. Nick's scripts were wonderful, too. [...] [t]hey're quite hard-hitting, dark and gritty, but at the same time, they are light and warm." From 2023, Roach appears in Wolf.

== Filmography ==
=== Film ===
Year	Title	Role	Notes
2010	StreetDance 3D	Jay	
2010	Shakespeare's Globe: Romeo and Juliet	Tybalt	Video
2010	StreetDance: The Moves	Jay	Video
2011	One Day	Rapper	
2021	Impressions: Ensign 7	—N/a	Writer, director, producer

=== Television ===
Year	Title	Role	Notes
2012	Eternal Law	Tom Greening	6 episodes
2012	Monroe	Jacob Namobu	Episode: #2.6
2012–2013	Starlings	Reuben	12 episodes
2013	Drifters	Rick Henderson	Episode: "Friend Night Stand"
2014	Silk	Jordan Sinclair	Episode: #3.2
2014	Grantchester	Johnny Johnson	Series 1, 2 episodes
2015	The Royals	Marcus	9 episodes
2015	Dickensian	Sergeant George	Episode: #1.3
2015–2020	Blindspot	Robert Borden	Main cast (seasons 1 & 2), 28 episodes recurring (season 3), 2 episodes guest (seasons 4 & 5), 2 episodes
2018	Hard Sun	Will Benedetti	3 episodes
2018	Humans	Anatole	5 episodes
2020	Death in Paradise	Archie Garwood	1 episode
2021–2022	Annika	Tyrone Clarke	9 episodes
2022	The Midwich Cuckoos	Tom Cork	8 episodes
2023	Wolf	Jack Caffery	6 episodes
2024	Big Mood	Jay	5 episodes
2024	Piglets	Mike	Main role

=== Video games ===
Year	Title	Role	Notes
2027	Fable	Hero of Briar Hill (male)	Voice
