= Y Sŵn =

- Directed by: Lee Haven Jones
- Written by: Roger Williams
- Produced by: Roger Williams
- Starring: Rhodri Evan; Mark Lewis Jones; Lily Beau; Eiry Thomas; Siân Reese-Williams
- Cinematography: Bryan Gavigan
- Edited by: Kevin Jones
- Music by: Siôn Trevor
- Production company: Joio
- Distributed by: S4C
- Release date: 10 March 2023
- Running time: 89 minutes
- Country: Wales
- Languages: Welsh and English

Y Sŵn is a Welsh language period film which follows the events of 1979–1980 leading up to the creation of Welsh medium television channel S4C. The film dramatises the fallout of the announcement made by Home Office, led by home secretary Willie Whitelaw, to renege on a Conservative election campaign pledge to establish a Welsh language channel. The film focuses on Plaid Cymru president Gwynfor Evans's campaign to hunger strike in protest at the government's u-turn, alongside the efforts of others to secure the channel, including campaign group Cymdeithas yr Iaith and Plaid Cymru MPs Dafydd Wigley and Dafydd Elis-Thomas.

Siân Reese-Williams appears as Margaret Thatcher, with Mark Lewis Jones as Willie Whitelaw and Rhodri Evan as Gwynfor Evans.

== Synopsis ==
The film is set after Margaret Thatcher became prime minister of the United Kingdom in 1979 with a manifesto that promised to establish a Welsh-language television channel.

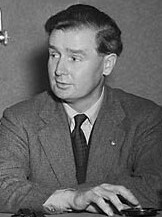
Gwynfor Evans, Welsh politician

Months following the general election, Thatcher made a U-turn on her promise which led to protests in Wales. At a time of civil disobedience in Wales, Gwynfor Evans announces his intention to hunger strike from October 1st, with a commitment to starve to death, until Thatcher reverted to the promise of a Welsh-language television channel.

== Showing ==
Y Sŵn was in cinemas in Wales from the 10–24 March 2023. There were also screenings at the Finsbury Park Picturehouse on 13 March 2023, FACT Liverpool on 20 March 2023, Storyhouse Cinema in Chester on 23 March 2023 and HOME in Manchester on 3 April 2023. The film premiered on S4C on 9 April 2023, and was made available after on S4C Clic and BBC iPlayer.

A post screening discussion was held by Hiraeth podcast including; Roger Williams (screenwriter), Dewi Rhys Williams (who plays G.O. Williams in Y Sŵn), Bethan Sayed (former Plaid Cymru Senedd Member and Chair of the Culture Committee), Matthew Hexter (Hiraeth podcast), Ceri Davies (Hiraeth podcast).

== Significance ==
Screenwriter–producer Roger Williams said, “After the success that Lee and I had with The Feast we are keen to ensure that more Welsh language films are seen on the big screen,"

“We are all, as a nation, aware of Gwynfor’s stance. But I was also interested in what happened in London, and in the Wales Office, because I am not aware that that story had been told at all"

Williams added that the showing of the film was timely: "I was interested in the debate, and the debate that was happening between London and Wales. As some of those conversations and debates continue to be about the way television is funded and the relationship between Wales and London, and the fact that broadcasting has not been devolved and in the front I felt that the best way for us as an audience to discuss that was through drama."

== Review ==
The film has received a positive review from journalist Molly Stubbs of Nation.Cymru.

A Buzz Magazine journalist gave the film a positive review with 4/5 stars.

A Get the Chance journalist also gave the film a positive review with 4/5 stars.

=== Accolades ===
Award	Date of ceremony	Category	Recipient(s)	Result	Ref.
British Academy Cymru Awards	15 October 2023	Best Feature / Television Film	Y Sŵn	Won	
British Academy Cymru Awards	15 October 2023	Best Director: Fiction	Lee Haven Jones	Nominated	
British Academy Cymru Awards	15 October 2023	Best Writer	Roger Williams	Nominated	
British Academy Cymru Awards	15 October 2023	Best Actress	Eiry Thomas	Nominated	
British Academy Cymru Awards	15 October 2023	Best Editing: Fiction	Kevin Jones	Won	
British Academy Cymru Awards	15 October 2023	Best Production Design	Dafydd Shurmer	Nominated	
British Academy Cymru Awards	15 October 2023	Best Photography and Lighting: Fiction	Bryan Gavigan	Nominated	
British Academy Cymru Awards	20 October 2024	Best Make-Up and Hair	James Spinks	Won	

== See also ==
- Cinema of Wales
- List of Welsh films
