= The Subject of Tragedy =

Literary criticism by Catherine Belsey

Routledge 2015 book cover

The Subject of Tragedy: Identity and Difference in Renaissance Drama is a nonfiction book written by Catherine Belsey and published in 1985 by Methuen Publishing. It has since been republished by Routledge on July 14, 2015.

== Synopsis ==
The book is a literary critique and an innovative interpretation of Renaissance drama. Belsey takes into account the patriarchy and the suppressed female voices of that period. Also, Belsey "situates the protagonists between the 'discontinuous' subjects of medieval morality plays, who must await death before arriving at the absorption into God's salvationist plan, and the 'unified' heroes of classic realist drama, who represent the spurious unity affirmed by the triumph of 'liberal humanism.'"

== Chapter titles ==
The book is divided into two parts: Part 1 Man consisting of chapters 2–4, and Part 2 Woman consisting of chapters 5–8. The chapter titles are:

1. Introduction: Reading the Past
2. Unity
3. Knowledge
4. Autonomy
5. Alice Arden's crime
6. Silence and speech
7. Finding a place
8. Conclusion: changing the present

The book also contains a Notes chapter, a Bibliography and an Index.

== See also ==
- English Renaissance theatre
- Mystery plays
