= Annes Elwy =

Welsh actress (born 1992)

- Born: 7 June 1992 (age 33); Penarth, Wales
- Occupation: Actress
- Years active: 2015–present

Annes Elwy (born 7 June 1992) is a Welsh actress, known for her screen roles in both English and Welsh language productions.

== Biography ==
Annes Elwy was brought up in Penarth, went to school in Barry, Vale of Glamorgan and trained at the Royal Welsh College of Music & Drama

She first gained widespread recognition for her role as Beth March in the 2017 BBC adaptation of 'Little Women', a role that introduced her to international audiences and let to her first Best Actress nomination at BAFTA Cymru, as well as being named as one of Variety's "10 to watch".

== Filmography ==
=== Film ===
| Year | Title | Role | Notes |
|---|---|---|---|
| 2015 | The Passing | Sara | |
| 2017 | King Arthur: Excalibur Rising | Ada | |
| 2018 | Apostle | Sinead | Uncredited role |
| 2021 | The Toll | Catrin | |
| 2021 | Gwledd (The Feast) | Cadi | |
| 2021 | Sunlight | Angharad | Short film |
| 2023 | Y Sŵn | Meinir Ffransis | |

=== Television ===
| Year | Title | Role | Notes |
|---|---|---|---|
| 2017 | Electric Dreams | Young Irma | Episode: "Impossible Planet" |
| 2017 | Little Women | Beth March | Mini-series, 3 episodes |
| 2019 | Craith (Hidden) | Mia Owen | 6 episodes |
| 2022 | Y Golau (The Light in the Hall) | Greta | 6 episodes |
| 2023 | Wolf | Lucia | 6 episodes |
| 2024 | Bariau | Elin James | 6 episodes |
