= The Great Outdoors (British TV series) =

- Written by: Kevin Cecil; Andy Riley
- Directed by: Catherine Morshead
- Starring: Ruth Jones; Mark Heap; Steve Edge; Katherine Parkinson; Stephen Wight; Gwyneth Keyworth; Joe Tracini
- Country of origin: United Kingdom
- Original language: English
- No. of series: 1
- No. of episodes: 3

Production
- Producers: David Peet; Paul Schlesinger; Alex Walsh-Taylor
- Camera setup: Single camera
- Running time: 30mins
- Production company: Tidy Productions

Original release
- Network: BBC Four; BBC HD BBC Two 2011
- Release: 28 July – 12 August 2010

The Great Outdoors is a British television sitcom. The series comprised three episodes, first airing on Wednesdays between 28 July and 12 August 2010 on BBC Four.

== Synopsis ==
The show follows a misfit rambling club in Southern England in which patronising group-leader Bob (Mark Heap) becomes embroiled in a battle of wills against new arrival and deputy group-leader Christine (Ruth Jones), who is determined that things should be done her way. She previously lived and rambled in Barnstaple and appears to have obsessive-compulsive personality disorder.

== Characters ==
- Ruth Jones as Christine
- Mark Heap as Bob Stevens
- Steve Edge as Tom
- Katherine Parkinson as Sophie
- Stephen Wight as Joe
- Gwyneth Keyworth as Hazel Stevens
- Joe Tracini as Victor
