= Sian Reese-Williams =

Welsh actress (born 1981)

- Born: 18 November 1981 (age 45); Glanamman, Carmarthenshire, Wales
- Education: Royal Welsh College of Music & Drama
- Occupation: Actress
- Years active: 2004–present
- Television: Emmerdale (2008–2013); Hinterland (2016) The Light in the Hall 2017; Hidden (2018–); Line of Duty (2019–)

Sian Reese-Williams (born 18 November 1981) is a Welsh actress, best known for playing detective Cadi John in three series of Hidden.

== Early life ==
Reese-Williams was born in Glanamman, South Wales. She lived in Swansea until the age of 4, when her family moved to Brecon, Mid Wales, where she attended Brecon High School. She is a native Welsh speaker.

She graduated in drama from the University of Hull and trained at the Royal Welsh College of Music & Drama. She now lives in south London.

== Television ==
In 2008, Reese-Williams was cast to play the role of Gennie Walker in Emmerdale. The character was created by series producer Kathleen Beedles, although by the time Reese-Williams's first episode aired on 1 April 2008, Anita Turner had taken over from Beedles. She was cast in the role and started filming in the week beginning 3 March 2008. In 2013, it was announced that Reese-Williams was to leave the soap. Her character was killed off on 25 July 2013.

In 2016, she featured in series 3 of critically acclaimed Welsh crime drama Hinterland / Y Gwyll, playing DI Tom Matthias's love interest, Manon.

In 2017, she starred in series 3 of the BAFTA Award-winning 35 Diwrnod for S4C.

Reese-Williams played the role of Trudy in the BBC One/Netflix drama Requiem, which aired in early 2018, followed by the lead role of Detective Inspector Cadi John, in a bilingual crime drama that was shown on S4C in January 2018 as Craith, with all dialogue recorded in both English and Welsh, before being broadcast on BBC Wales and BBC Four as Hidden in June 2018. A second series aired in 2019. A third and final series aired in 2022.

In January 2020, she appeared in Silent Witness as Tina Harcourt, a long time beaten wife who took revenge on the husbands & partners of other beaten women by killing some and framing others for their murders.

Reese-Williams commenced work in BBC serial hospital drama Holby City in November 2020, playing Jodie, a tea lady, who has a relationship with consultant Sacha Levy, while he is recovering from the recent death of his fiancée Essie De Lucca. Reese-Williams appeared in Vera on 29 August 2021 in the episode "Witness" in the role of Beth Draper. Reese-Williams currently also stars in the Welsh language TV drama 'Y Golau/ The Light in the Hall 2023-

== Theatre ==
Following her stint in Emmerdale, Reese-Williams returned to theatre and in November 2013 played Marta in Children of Fate at the Bussey Building in Peckham.

In May/June 2014, she played Linda in Alan Bennett's Enjoy at the West Yorkshire Playhouse.

She has worked extensively with new-writing theatre Paines Plough on their Roundabout Theatre season. She starred to wide critical acclaim as W in Duncan Macmillan's Lungs, which was awarded the 2016 Manchester Theatre Award for Best Studio Production.

In 2019 respectively, Sian played the lead character of Gina in Roy Williams Sing Yer Heart Out for the Lads, at Chichester Festival Theatre. Following 5 star reviews, the production was set to transfer to the Royal National Theatre's Dorfman Theatre in 2020. The transfer was cancelled due to the COVID-19 pandemic. She reprised the role at CFT's Minerva Theatre in 2022.

== Filmography ==
Film
Year	Film	Role	Notes
2020	Justine	Leanne	
2021	Cysylltiad (Connection)	Luned	Short film
2023	Y Sŵn	Margaret Thatcher	
2023	Adra Ni Y Môr (Our Home the Sea)	Alys	Short film
2024	The Beautiful Game	Sian	
TBA	Shutter Speed	Fi	Short film; pre-production. Also executive producer

Television
Year	Title	Role	Notes
2007	Cowbois ac Injans	Stella	Series 2; episode 7: "Y Ditectif Da"
2008–2013	Emmerdale	Gennie Walker	Series regular; 722 episodes
2016	Hinterland	Manon	Series 3 regular; 3 episodes
2017	35 Diwrnod	Sara	Main role. Series 3; 8 episodes
2017	Requiem	Trudy Franken	Main role. Mini-series; 6 episodes
2018–2021	Hidden	DI/DCI Cadi John	Main role. Series 1–3; 19 episodes
2019	Line of Duty	PS Jane Cafferty	Series 5; 2 episodes
2019	Pili Pala	Sara Morris	Main role; 4 episodes
2020	Silent Witness	Tina Harcourt	Series 23; 2 episodes: "Seven Times: Parts 1 & 2"
2020–2021	Holby City	Jodie Rodgers	Recurring role; 11 episodes
2021	Vera	Beth Draper	Series 11; episode 2: "Recovery"
2022	The Light in the Hall	Caryl	
2023	Wolf	DI Maia Lincoln	6 episodes
2024	The Chelsea Detective	Sylvie Wix	Series 3; episode 1: "Everybody Loves Chloe"
2026	Waiting for the Out	Laura Holt	2 episodes
2026	Power: The Downfall of Huw Edwards	Carys Davies	Docudrama film

Video games
Year	Title	Role (voice)	Notes
2010	Civilization V	Boudicca	

== Awards and nominations ==
Year	Award	Category	Result	Ref.
2008	Inside Soap Awards	Best Newcomer	Nominated	
2013	The British Soap Awards	Best Actress	Nominated	
2021	International Film Festival of Wales	Best Supporting Actress	Won	
