= Hidden (2018 TV series) =

Welsh television drama series

- Also known as: Craith
- Genre: Crime drama
- Created by: Mark Andrew; Ed Talfan
- Directed by: Gareth Bryn; Eric Styles; Chris Forster
- Starring: Sian Reese-Williams; Siôn Alun Davies; Nia Roberts; Victoria Pugh; Lowri Izzard; Garmon Rhys; Sarah Tempest; Lois Meleri-Jones; Megan Llŷn
- Music by: Victoria Ashfield; Samuel Barnes; John E.R. Hardy; Benjamin Talbott
- Country of origin: United Kingdom (Wales)
- Original languages: Welsh; English
- No. of series: 3
- No. of episodes: 20

Production
- Executive producers: Mark Andrew; Ed Talfan
- Producer: Hannah Thomas
- Cinematography: Stuart Biddlecombe
- Running time: 60 minutes
- Production company: Severn Screen

Original release
- Network: S4C (Welsh-language version); BBC Four (English-language version)
- Release: 7 January 2018 – 14 November 2021

Related
- Hinterland

Hidden (Welsh: Craith) is a Welsh television drama serial, created by Mark Andrew and Ed Talfan. It was initially broadcast in Welsh on the Welsh-language channel S4C under its Welsh name Craith. The bilingual version of the series, under the English name Hidden, was broadcast on BBC One Wales and BBC Four. The Welsh-language versions of the first two series aired on S4C in 2018 and 2019, respectively, with the third and final series beginning on 10 October 2021. The English-language version of the third and final series aired in April 2022.

== Plot ==
A body of a woman is found in the woods who is later identified as Mali Pryce, a troubled girl who went missing in 2011. Detective Inspector Cadi John and Detective Sergeant Owen Vaughan are leading the investigation. Injury marks on the body indicate that Mali had been held shackled by her abductor for all these years. Cadi finds evidence implying that Mali may not have been the only victim held by the abductor. Meanwhile Dylan Harris, a labourer is seen mistreated and beaten by his mother Iona.

== Overview ==
Leading actress Sian Reese-Williams commented that the series was more of a "personal drama" than a crime series, because of the multiple human stories involved, including those of the victims, the families of the victims, and the criminal protagonist. The format concentrates on "why" rather than "who" committed the crime.

== Cast ==
=== Main ===
- Sian Reese-Williams as Detective Inspector (later Detective Chief Inspector) Cadi John, a former soldier
- Siôn Alun Davies as Detective Sergeant Owen Vaughan, a local boy who grew up on a tough housing estate in Caernarfon
- Nia Roberts as Dr Elin Jones, Cadi's older sister, a hospital doctor
- Lois Meleri-Jones as Lowri Driscoll, a district nurse (main, series 1; guest, series 2)
- Rhodri Meilir as Dylan Harris, a labourer (Series 1)
- Gillian Elisa as Iona Harris, Dylan's mother (Series 1)
- Gwyneth Keyworth as Megan Ruddock, a first-year psychology student at Bangor University (Series 1)
- Ian Saynor as Huw John, Cadi's terminally ill father, a retired detective superintendent (Series 1)
- Owen Arwyn as Alun Pryce, father of Mali Pryce (Series 1)
- Greta James as Mali Pryce (Series 1)
- Annes Elwy as Mia Owen, schoolgirl (Series 2)
- Steffan Cennydd as Connor Pritchard, schoolboy (Series 2)
- Lisa Victoria as Catrin Pritchard, Connor's mother (Series 2)
- Siôn Eifion as Lee Williams, a cousin of Mia (Series 2)
- Bryn Fôn as Hefin Mathews, owner of a rural garage and petrol station (Series 2)
- Lois Elenid as Beca Mathews, Hefin's daughter (Series 2)
- Owain Gwynn as Siôn Wells, Hefin's tenant opposite the garage (Series 2)
- Justin Melluish as Glyn Thomas, a pigeon fancier who has Down's syndrome (Series 3)
- Sion Ifan as Siôn Thomas, Glyn's younger brother, a labourer (Series 3)
- Elen Rhys as Hannah Lewis, Glyn's employer and Siôn's ex-girlfriend (Series 3)

=== Recurring ===
- Megan Llŷn as Bethan John, younger sister of Cadi and Elin
- Victoria Pugh as Detective Superintendent Susan Lynn
- Lowri Izzard as Police Constable Mari James (Series 1–2)
- Garmon Rhys as Police Constable Ryan Davies
- Sarah Tempest as Detective Constable Alys Mitchell
- Melangell Dolma as Sam Shepherd, Owen's girlfriend, a solicitor (Series 1–2)
- Lara Catrin as Lea Pryce, younger sister of Mali Pryce (Series 1 and 3)
- Elodie Wilton as Nia Harris, Dylan's ten-year-old daughter (Series 1)
- Rhodri Sion as Ieuan Rhys, a local drug dealer and hard man in Llanberis (Series 1)
- Mark Lewis Jones as Endaf Elwy, imprisoned for the murder of his niece, Anna Williams (Series 1)
- Ioan Hefin as Matthew Heston, neighbour of the Harris family (Series 1)
- Mali Ann Rees as Ffion, Megan's best friend (Series 1)
- Mali Tudno Jones as Dr Rachel West, the local pathologist, who becomes Cadi's girlfriend (Series 2–3)
- Ffion Dafis as Kelly Owen, Mia's mother (Series 2)
- Jac Jones as Liam Pritchard, Connor's younger brother (Series 2)
- Dyfrig Evans as Glyn Jones, Kelly's boyfriend (Series 2)
- Manon Prysor as Rhian Jenkins, estranged daughter of murder victim Geraint Elis (Series 2)
- Gruffydd Owain Wyn Jones as Jason Williams, Lee's older brother (Series 2)
- Mark Flanagan as Karl Lewis, a power station worker who once accused Geraint Elis of child abuse (Series 2)
- Sion Pritchard as James Rhys, a former youth worker (Series 2)
- Llion Williams as Ifan Jenkins, Rhian's controlling husband (Series 2)
- Nia Hâf as Lois Jones, Elin's teenage daughter (Series 2)
- Gwawr Loader as Police Constable Gwawr Daniels (Series 3)
- Rhodri Evan as Father Richard McEwan, the local Catholic parish priest (Series 3)
- Dritan Kastrati as Piotr Korecki, a Polish labourer (Series 3)
- Oliver Jones as Ifan Williams, a murdered farmer (Series 3)
- Rhian Blythe as Siwan Williams, wife of Ifan Williams, a murdered farmer (Series 3)
- Lewsyn Blaidd Watts as Guto Williams, young son of Ifan and Siwan Williams (Series 3)
- Gwen Ellis as Mair Williams, mother of Ifan Williams (Series 3)
- William Thomas as Dafydd O'Connell, former farmhand on the Williams farm (Series 3)

== Filming and release ==
Filming took place in 2017 in Bangor and Snowdonia. The series was the second project on which Andrew and Talfan collaborated, following Hinterland. It was first broadcast as Craith, in Welsh, on S4C on 7 January 2018 and aired weekly. A bi-lingual version of the series aired, mainly in English, on BBC One Wales and BBC Four in June 2018 under the title of Hidden.

Hidden was renewed for a second series in February 2019, set largely in Blaenau Ffestiniog. It broadcast first on S4C on 17 November 2019.

In January 2021, the BBC announced that a third series had been commissioned to air later in the year, with Sian Reese-Williams and Siôn Alun Davies returning in their roles of, respectively, DCI Cadi John and DS Owen Vaughan. The series has six episodes.

== Episodes ==
Airdates listed as per the S4C broadcast. English subtitled repeats were broadcast at 22:30 on Fridays. A bi-lingual version aired six months later on BBC One Wales on Tuesdays, being shown nationally on BBC Four on Saturday evenings.

Series 3 was broadcast on BBC4 and iPlayer from Saturday 19 March 2022.

Series	Episodes	Originally released	
Series	Episodes	First released	Last released
1	8	7 January 2018	25 February 2018
2	6	17 November 2019	22 December 2019
3	6	19 March 2022	23 April 2022

=== Series 1 (2018) ===
No. overall	No. in series	Title	Directed by	Written by	Original release date	BBC Four airdate	S4C viewers (millions)	BBC Four viewers (millions)
1	1	"Episode 1"	Gareth Bryn	Mark Andrew & Caryl Lewis	7 January 2018	9 June 2018	0.69	1.02
A body of a woman is found in the woods who is later identified as Mali Pryce, a troubled girl who went missing in 2011. Detective Inspector Cadi John and Detective Sergeant Owen Vaughan are leading the investigation. Injury marks on the body indicate that Mali had been held shackled by her abductor for all these years. Cadi finds evidence implying that Mali may not have been the only victim held by the abductor. Meanwhile Dylan Harris, a labourer, is seen to be mistreated and beaten by his mother Iona.
2	2	"Episode 2"	Gareth Bryn	James Rourke & Caryl Lewis	14 January 2018	16 June 2018	0.49	0.69
3	3	"Episode 3"	Eric Styles	James Rourke	21 January 2018	23 June 2018	0.51	0.60
4	4	"Episode 4"	Gareth Bryn	Jeff Murphy	28 January 2018	30 June 2018	0.48	0.53
5	5	"Episode 5"	Eric Styles	James Rourke	4 February 2018	7 July 2018	0.54	0.53
6	6	"Episode 6"	Chris Forster	Caryl Lewis	11 February 2018	14 July 2018	0.40	1.15
7	7	"Episode 7"	Gareth Bryn	Jeff Murphy	18 February 2018	14 June 2018	0.44	0.69
8	8	"Episode 8"	Gareth Bryn	Caryl Lewis	25 February 2018	28 June 2018	0.40	0.70

=== Series 2 (2019) ===
No. overall	No. in series	Title	Directed by	Written by	Original release date	BBC Four airdate	S4C viewers (millions)	BBC Four viewers (millions)
9	1	"Episode 1"	Gareth Bryn	Caryl Lewis & James Rourke	17 November 2019	15 February 2020	0.44	0.85
Blaenau Ffestiniog, nine months later. An anonymous phone call leads DCI Cadi John and DS Owen Vaughan to the corpse of an old man who has been decaying for weeks in his bath.
10	2	"Episode 2"	Gareth Bryn	Caryl Lewis	24 November 2019	22 February 2020	0.46	0.51
Cadi and Owen look into the dead man's background and discover there are reasons behind his reclusiveness. Connor confides in Mia about Geraint Ellis, and she convinces him that the old man deserved what happened to him. He still feels isolated after his fight with Lee, until he is reluctantly persuaded to go to a rave at the quarry.
11	3	"Episode 3"	Gareth Bryn	James Rourke	1 December 2019	29 February 2020	0.41	0.53
The community gathers to mourn the passing of Geraint Ellis, and Mia cannot keep away. That night, she and her friends visit an old ruin with a dark history. Mia draws Connor closer to her.
12	4	"Episode 4"	Chris Forster	David Chidlow	8 December 2019	7 March 2020	0.49	0.43
Karl Lewis admits while questioned by Cadi that the accusations he brought against Ellis were false. Cadi turns her attention to Mia, whose false testimony led to Karl's arrest.
13	5	"Episode 5"	Chris Forster	David Chidlow	15 December 2019	14 March 2020	0.32	0.45
Cadi is informed that a body has been found at a remote petrol station outside Blaenau Ffestiniog. Suspecting the worst, she issues a warrant for Mia's arrest, but all efforts to trace her fail.
14	6	"Episode 6"	Chris Forster	Caryl Lewis	22 December 2019	21 March 2020	0.36	0.47
Deep in the mountains, the search continues, before Cadi and Mia finally come face to face – the hunter and the hunted. The sad truth about the murders begins to emerge, with two innocent people killed and three young lives destroyed.

=== Series 3 (2022) ===
No. overall	No. in series	Title	Directed by	Written by	Original release date	BBC Four airdate	S4C viewers (millions)	BBC Four viewers (millions)
15	1	"Episode 1"	Chris Forster	Caryl Lewis	10 October 2021	19 March 2022	N/A	TBA
When the body of local farmer Ifan Williams is discovered in a remote river in the middle of the North Wales countryside, DCI Cadi John and DS Owen Vaughan are called to investigate. Cadi learns of the call whilst attending an interview for the role of DSI in Liverpool.
16	2	"Episode 2"	Chris Forster	Caryl Lewis	17 October 2021	26 March 2022	N/A	TBA
Cadi has to admit the truth to Rachel about her new job. Father McEwan pays a visit to Sion and Glyn, but Sion is suspicious about his motives.
17	3	"Episode 3"	Chris Forster	Caryl Lewis	24 October 2021	2 April 2022	N/A	TBA
DCI John and DS Vaughan make an arrest under cover of darkness, bringing Piotr Korecki in for questioning where he is shown incriminating CCTV footage. The interview concludes in the early hours of the morning and Cadi, still reeling from her argument with Rachel, sleeps alone in the office.
18	4	"Episode 4"	Andy Newbery	Caryl Lewis	31 October 2021	9 April 2022	N/A	TBA
DCI John, along with DS Vaughan pay another visit to the farm. They speak again with Mair who reveals interesting information. After the visit, Cadi tells Vaughan about the job offer in Liverpool. Vaughan is pleased for his friend and colleague – but is Cadi beginning to regret her decision?
19	5	"Episode 5"	Andy Newbery	Liam Foley	7 November 2021	16 April 2022	N/A	TBA
Tragic news spreads through the community. Cadi thinks she knows who is responsible for the murders and sends out a dispatch unit under cover of darkness. But will she be in time?
20	6	"Episode 6"	Andy Newbery	Caryl Lewis	14 November 2021	23 April 2022	N/A	TBA
Cadi is in a race against time as she tries to prevent another tragedy unfolding. The truth about the murders begins to emerge and emotions are high.

== Reception ==
The Guardian compared Hidden favourably to the Swedish Scandi-noir drama The Bridge, describing it as one of the "current powerhouse run of Wales-set dramas", with "scenes in Welsh to provide that sweet Nordic subtitles hit". It went on to say "Hidden is perhaps the most confidently stylish and stylised yet. As well as a gorgeously gothic credits sequence, it features handsomely brooding landscapes, offbeat interior locations that go far beyond the usual bland corridors/offices of cop drama, and an ominous, skin-prickling soundtrack skilfully employed to heighten the sense of dread."

== See also ==
- List of Welsh television series
