= Big Font. Large Spacing =

- DVD cover
- Directed by: Paul Howard Allen
- Written by: Paul Howard Allen
- Produced by: Vivien Müller-Rommel
- Starring: Jamie Kristian; Amy Morgan; Gareth Aldon; Kimberley Wintle
- Cinematography: Nicolas Booth
- Edited by: Matt Freeth
- Production company: 33Story Productions
- Distributed by: 2D Cinema
- Release dates: 17 April 2010 (Atlanta Film Festival); 24 September 2010 (United Kingdom; DVD)
- Running time: 80 minutes
- Country: United Kingdom
- Language: English

Big Font. Large Spacing is a 2010 British comedy film directed by Paul Howard Allen. Set in Cardiff, the film tells the story of a night in the life of two psychology students who find out that the term's major essay is due in the next morning. The film was toured around British universities on a touring cinema over three years during the freshers week period.

== Cast ==
- Jamie Kristian as Tom
- Amy Morgan as Sarah
- Gareth Aldon as Steve
- Kimberley Wintle as Debbie

== Production ==
The film was produced by 33Story Productions and Boomerang, both Cardiff-based television/film production companies. Principal photography took place over three weeks in December 2008.

== Release ==
The film premiered at the Atlanta Film Festival on 17 April 2010. It was then taken around universities during the September/October freshers week period by the film makers themselves over a three-year period. On 24 September 2010, the film was released on DVD in the United Kingdom.
