= The Toll (2021 film) =

2021 Welsh black comedy film

- Film poster
- Directed by: Ryan Andrew Hooper
- Written by: Matt Redd
- Produced by: Mark Hopkins
- Starring: Michael Smiley; Annes Elwy; Iwan Rheon; Paul Kaye
- Cinematography: Adrian Peckitt
- Edited by: John Richards; Ben Unwin
- Music by: Rael Jones
- Production company: Western Edge Pictures
- Distributed by: Signature Entertainment
- Release date: 25 February 2021 (Glasgow Film Festival)
- Running time: 83 minutes
- Country: United Kingdom
- Languages: English; Welsh

The Toll, released in the US with the title Tollbooth, is a 2021 Welsh black comedy crime film directed by Ryan Andrew Hooper and written by Matt Redd. The film stars Michael Smiley, Annes Elwy, Iwan Rheon and Paul Kaye. It premiered at the Official Selection of the 2021 Glasgow Film Festival.

== Plot ==
In Pembrokeshire, a man working solo shifts in the quietest toll booth in Wales hides from a criminal past where nobody would ever look. As his past actions catch up with him and his peace is shattered, he enlists the help of local ne’er-do-wells and oddballs (including a female Elvis impersonator, rampaging triplets and disgruntled sheep farmers) when local police officer Catrin grows increasingly suspicious.

== Cast ==
- Michael Smiley as Toll Booth
- Annes Elwy as Catrin
- Iwan Rheon as Dom
- Paul Kaye as Cliff
- Gary Beadle as Elton
- Steve Oram as Mr Henry
- Evelyn Mok as Dixie
- Darren Evans as Tab
- Gwyneth Keyworth as The Triplets
- Dewi Pws Morris as Pops
- Julian Glover as Magnus
- Sarah Breese as Frankie
- Ioan Hefin as Morgan Farm
- Hefin Rees as Gwyn
- Martyn Stallard as Daffodil
- Dean Rehman as Victor
- Dan Renton Skinner as Desk Sergeant Simon
- Carys Eleri as Betty

== Production ==
On 6 December 2016, it was announced that Ffilm Cymru Wales were developing ten feature film projects in partnership with the BFI, including The Toll and projects by Prano Bailey-Bond and Lee Haven-Jones, three of which would then be green lit for production. On 11 June 2017, The Times newspaper reported that Olivier award-winning actor Simon Russell Beale had appeared in a short film after being "charmed" by director Ryan Andrew Hooper. The short film had been funded by Ffilm Cymru Wales and the BFI, and was used by Hooper as a proof of concept for the feature film. It was announced on 10 December 2018 by Screen Daily that shooting of The Toll had been completed in Wales and that the film would star Michael Smiley, Annes Elwy, Iwan Rheon, Paul Kaye and Steve Oram.

== Release ==
On 9 July 2021, Empire magazine exclusively launched a trailer for The Toll, announcing that the film would be released in UK cinemas on 27 August 2021. Prior to its release in the UK, the film would be released theatrically in Australia and New Zealand on 29 July 2021.

On 11 July 2021, it was announced that Great Point Media had sold rights for the film's release in the UK, US, Australia/New Zealand and France.

On 25 August 2021, while promoting the UK release of the film, Iwan Rheon appeared in a "car crash" interview on ITV's flagship morning show Good Morning Britain where the presenters repeatedly got a number of facts about the actor wrong live on air, including a claim that he had ambitions to enter the Eurovision Song Contest.

On 25 January 2022, Comingsoon.net launched a new US trailer and poster for the film with the title Tollbooth, announcing that the film would be released digitally in the US on 18 March 2022.

== Reception ==
On 20 October 2021, The Hollywood Reporter announced that screenwriter Matt Redd had been long-listed for Best Debut Screenwriter by the British Independent Film Awards for his script. The film was also long-listed for the Discovery award (for independent UK titles with a budget under £500,000) by BIFA.

On review aggregator website Rotten Tomatoes, the film has an 86% approval rating based on 22 reviews.

Writing in The Guardian, critic Cath Clarke awarded the film three stars and described it as "an entertaining black comedy.

Tom Shone of Sunday Times also awarded the film three out of five, saying "it has the right sort of wit and mordancy, along with a core of seriousness."

There was another three star review from Matt Glasby in the Radio Times, who said the film "plays like a stylishly shot sitcom, with good gags about thorny UK relationships and a strong supporting cast including Paul "Dennis Pennis" Kaye."

Owen Richards of The Arts Desk gave the film a four star review, saying "Ryan Andrew Hooper's debut feature is perfect for film aficionados looking for a light bite of entertainment. Eighty-three minutes of swearing, gore and just enough twists to keep you on your toes."
