= On All Floors =

- Directed by: Geoff Evans
- Written by: Craig Handley
- Starring: Jason May; Tom Lewis
- Release date: 2002
- Country: United Kingdom
- Language: English

On All Floors is a 2002 British short film directed by Geoff Evans and written by Craig Handley. It is a dark comedy which tells the story of five people who are trapped in a falling elevator. Believing they have only a few minutes left to live, the lift's occupants start to confess their deepest, darkest secrets.

== Plot and characters ==
Stuart (Jason May) is in his mid-thirties and is the manager of a highly successful sales company. Unknown to his colleagues and indeed his employers, is that Stuart has previous criminal convictions for horse buggery and a penchant for wearing his dead mother's lingerie.

Michael (Rhys Morris) is the self-proclaimed office "whipping boy". Lecherous and unpopular, Michael is very keen to form a meaningless and purely sexual relationship with any woman, but especially Melanie (Catrin Mara), the 22-year-old office receptionist who admits to falsely accusing her family dog of starting a fire.

Glen (Tom Lewis) is twenty-four and a senior broker at a private equity firm, located in the building. Handsome but ultimately shy, Glen has held a homosexual desire for his school friend and now colleague, Matthew (Dean Keohane).

While finishing work, late, on a Friday afternoon, the employees of several prestigious companies in a Cardiff office block, enter the large elevator, which will take them to the ground floor. After descending through several floors, the lift comes to a screeching halt, followed by the sounds of cables snapping and creaking.

Several hours later and with no sign of any help forthcoming, the occupants are resigned to dying. Michael, much to the chagrin of Stuart, makes a smutty, suggestive remark to Melanie. Ever the loyal manager, Stuart is quick to defend the young woman, only to reveal his troubled and disturbing past, involving several incidents of wearing his dead mother's underwear to school and a criminal conviction for horse buggery.

Shocked by this apparently carefree confession, each of the other characters, save for Michael, confess their own dark secrets, which culminates in Glen, declaring his long-held love for Matthew, who, to the delight of Glen; reciprocates.

Suddenly and without warning, the elevator finally breaks free of its cables and hurtles to the ground floor. There is darkness, followed by the flickering of lights as the elevator doors open. Stuart is lying on his back as Michael and Melanie step over him and exit the elevator. Matthew and Glen leave the elevator holding hands.

Stuart is horrified that he and the others have survived, especially when he realises that he has to see the same people every day; all of whom know his dirty little secret.

The film ends with a fantastic expression of horror on Stuart's face and the final punch-line of Matthew returning to the elevator and making a horse noise to Stuart.

== Impact of the film ==
Made as part of the 2002 Screen Gems initiative, the film enjoyed wide theatrical distribution throughout the United Kingdom, where it was usually shown before many of the major cinema releases of the time, such as Die Another Day.

Despite the film having a very minor homosexual theme, On All Floors has enjoyed considerable success on the international gay and lesbian film festival circuit, where it has gained very positive reviews.

== See also ==
- List of lesbian, gay, bisexual, or transgender-related films by storyline
