= Catherine Belsey =

British literary critic and academic (1940–2021)

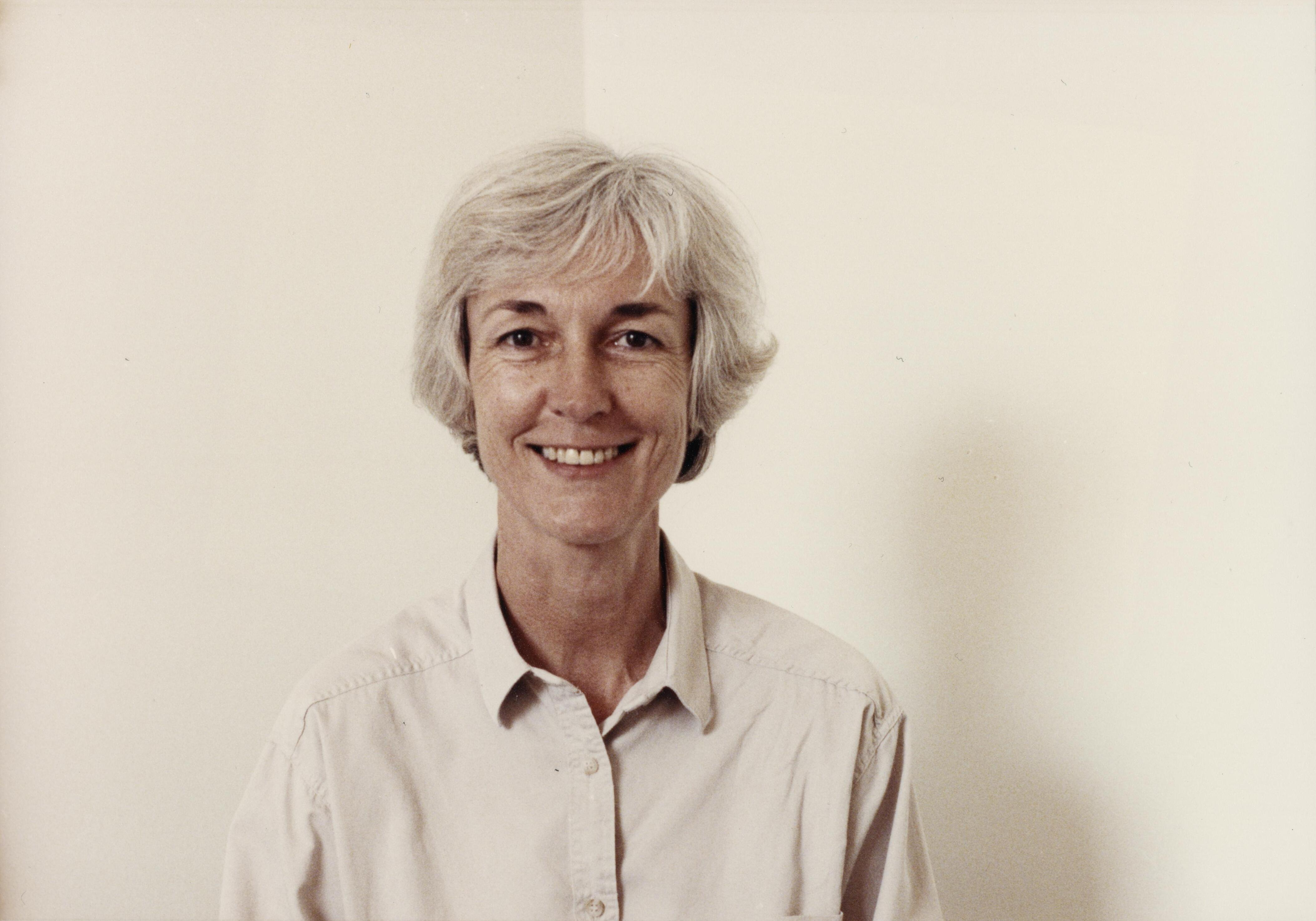
Belsey in 1990

Catherine Belsey (13 December 1940 – 14 February 2021) was a British literary critic and academic.

== Early life ==
Belsey was born in Salisbury and attended Godolphin and Latymer School in London. She studied at Somerville College, Oxford, and subsequently as a postgraduate at the University of Warwick.

== Career ==
Belsey was briefly a Fellow at New Hall, Cambridge. She chaired the Centre for Critical and Cultural Theory at Cardiff University (1988–2003) before moving to Swansea University (2006–2014). Her book Critical Practice (1980) was an influential post-structuralist text in suggesting new directions for literary studies. She was later Visiting Professor of English at the University of Derby and Fellow of the English Association and Fellow of the Learned Society of Wales. She has consistently aligned herself with international innovations in the theory and practice of criticism. Besides her profuse scholarly writing, Belsey often expressed her beliefs in the values of socialism and the importance of the humanities.

Belsey has written about the effect of romance novels on modern society.

== Works ==
- Critical Practice (1980, 2002)
- The Subject of Tragedy: Identity and Difference in Renaissance Drama (1985, 2015)
- John Milton: Language, Gender, Power (1988)
- Desire: Love Stories in Western Culture (1994)
- Shakespeare and the Loss of Eden (1999)
- Poststructuralism: A Very Short Introduction (2002)
- Culture and the Real (2005)
- Why Shakespeare? (2007)
- Shakespeare in Theory and Practice (2008)
- A Future for Criticism (2011)
- Romeo and Juliet: Language and Writing (2014)
- Criticism (2016)
- Tales of the Troubled Dead: Ghost Stories in Cultural History (2019)
