= Lisa Victoria =

Welsh actress

'Lisa Victoria Edwards' (born 1973), known professionally as Lisa Victoria, is a Welsh television actor best known for playing the character of Sheryl Hughes in the long-running Welsh soap Pobol y Cwm on S4C.

Edwards was born in Treherbert. Her previous career includes stage and television performances for BBC Wales, HTV and S4C, as well as the leading role of the character Kelly in the BBC Radio Wales soap Station Road.
