= Roger Boore =

Welsh publisher and author (1938–2021)

- Born: 28 September 1938; Cardiff, Wales
- Died: 30 July 2021 (aged 82)
- Education: Warwick School; Jesus College, Oxford (1961); University of Wales Swansea, Ph.D. (2005)

Roger Boore (28 September 1938 – 30 July 2021) was a Welsh-language publisher and author who founded the Welsh publishing house Dref Wen.

== Life and work ==
Roger Boore was born in Cardiff, Wales, in 1938, and was brought up in Leamington Spa, Warwickshire, England, where he attended Warwick School. He was awarded a degree in classics (“Literae Humaniores”) at Jesus College, Oxford, in 1961 and a PhD in history at University of Wales Swansea in 2005. He was qualified as a Chartered Accountant. He was a life-long enthusiast of the Welsh language, which he began learning in his teens.

In 1969-70 Boore and his wife Anne founded the Cardiff publishing house Dref Wen, which was the first press to focus mainly on full-colour Welsh language books for children, thus transforming this aspect of the Welsh book market and of Welsh culture.

Under Boore's management Dref Wen also produced bilingual and educational books for children (as it continues to do). Its many publications in that period included Llyfr Hwiangerddi y Dref Wen (the standard Welsh nursery rhyme collection), Y Geiriadur Lliwgar (Welsh children's dictionary), the “Welsh History Stories” series and the prize-winning “From Start to Finish” series on religions (each collection being issued in both Welsh and English).

Boore translated many children's books into Welsh, from a variety of languages, for publication by Dref Wen.

He retired in 1999.

In 1997 Boore received the Mary Vaughan Jones Award for his “notable contribution to the field of children’s books in Wales over a period of years” and in 2016 was elected to the Gorsedd of Bards of the National Eisteddfod of Wales for his “special contribution to Wales and the Welsh language”.

Boore won the short story competition at the 1971 National Eisteddfod of Wales and the Prose Medal at the 1972 Pantyfedwen Eisteddfod. He published one collection of short stories, one children's novel, and, after his retirement from publishing, a ground-breaking series of five travel books.

== Bibliography ==
=== Children's books ===
- Hoff Hwiangerddi (“Favourite Welsh nursery rhymes”) with Rhian Nest James (2001). Cardiff, Dref Wen. ISBN 1-85596-471-6
- Y Bachgen Gwyllt (“The Wild Boy”) novel (1995). Cardiff, Dref Wen. ISBN 1-85596-186-5

=== Travel books ===
- Taith i Rufain (“Journey to Rome”) (2017). Cardiff, Dref Wen. ISBN 978-1-78423-079-1
- Taith trwy Dde Sbaen (“Journey through southern Spain”) (2012). Cardiff, Dref Wen. ISBN 978-1-85596-952-0
- Glas y Sierra: Taith trwy ddwyrain Sbaen (“Sierra blue: Journey through eastern Spain”) (2010). Cardiff, Dref Wen. ISBN 978-1-85596-895-0
- Marchogion Crwydrol: Taith trwy berfeddwlad Sbaen (“Knights errant: Journey through the heartland of Spain”) (2010). Cardiff, Dref Wen. ISBN 978-1-85596-857-8
- Taith i Awstralia (“Journey to Australia”) (2008). Cardiff, Dref Wen. ISBN 978-1-85596-816-5

=== Other books ===
- Llyfrau Plant mewn Ieithoedd Lleiafrifol (“Children’s Books in Minority Languages”) (1978). Cardiff, Dref Wen
- Ymerodraeth y Cymry (“Empire of the Welsh”) short stories (1973). Cardiff, Dref Wen

== Awards and honours ==
- Elected to Gorsedd of Bards, National Eisteddfod of Wales, 2016
- Mary Vaughan Jones Award, 1997
- Prose Medal, Pantyfedwen Eisteddfod 1972
- Winner short story competition, National Eisteddfod of Wales, 1971
