= Dennis A'Court =

Welsh cricketer (1937–2021)

Personal information
- Full name: Dennis George A'Court
- Born: 27 July 1937; Markham, Caerphilly County Borough, Wales
- Died: 23 May 2021 (aged 83)
- Batting: Right-handed
- Bowling: Right-arm fast medium

Domestic team information
- Years: Team
- 1960–1963: Gloucestershire

Career statistics
Competition	First-class
Matches	49
Runs scored	420
Batting average	11.35
100s/50s	0/0
Top score	47*
Balls bowled	9585
Wickets	145
Bowling average	26.82
5 wickets in innings	5
10 wickets in match	0
Best bowling	6/25
Catches/stumpings	10/-
- Source: CricketArchive

Dennis George A'Court (27 July 1937 – 23 May 2021) was a Welsh-born cricketer who played for Gloucestershire. A right-arm medium-fast bowler and a right-handed tail-end batsman, he played first-class cricket for Gloucestershire between 1960 and 1963. He was born in Markham in Monmouthshire, a former mining village.

He took 145 first-class wickets, with a best of 6 for 25 against the South African tourists in 1960: Wisden noted that he "shocked the South Africans with his accuracy, liveliness, and disconcerting swing and movement of the ball." He took five wickets in an innings on five occasions.
