= John ac Alun =

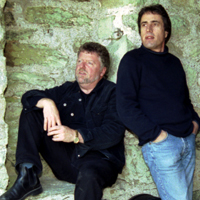

Background information
- Origin: Tudweiliog, Wales
- Genres: Country music
- Years active: 1990–present
- Labels: Sain
- Members: John Jones; Alun Roberts

John ac Alun (John and Alun) are a Welsh country music duo. They are sometimes accompanied by backing musicians, the best known of whom are Tudur Morgan (bass guitar), Charli Britton (formerly of the Welsh rock band Edward H. Dafis; d. 2021) and Simon Barton (drummers).

Both John Jones and Alun Roberts come from the village of Tudweiliog and they went to school together. Jones is a former blacksmith and JCB driver, whilst Roberts works for Cyngor Gwynedd.

Most of their songs are written by themselves, but some have been written by Welsh poets and novelists such as the late Eirug Wyn.

They visited Nashville, Tennessee, United States, in 1999, sang and recorded at Sun Studio in Memphis, Tennessee.

The duo have released eight albums in Welsh and one in English. They released their first album Yr Wylan Wen/Chwarelwr (The Seagull/Quarryman) in 1991, and received a gold disc by their label Sain in 1992 after selling 12,000 copies. John and Alun also have a radio show on Radio Cymru, and have starred in four series of their own television show, John ac Alun for the Welsh-language channel S4C.

Their most recent album, Cyrraedd Y Cychwyn was released in October 2019 on the Aran label.
