= The Feast =

- Film poster
- Welsh: Gwleðð
- Directed by: Lee Haven Jones
- Written by: Roger Williams
- Produced by: Roger Williams
- Starring: Annes Elwy; Nia Roberts; Julian Lewis Jones
- Cinematography: Bjørn Ståle Bratberg
- Edited by: Kevin Jones
- Music by: Samuel Sim
- Production companies: Sgrech; S4C; BFI; Fields Park; Melville Media; Ffilm Cymru Wales; Bankside Films
- Distributed by: Picturehouse Entertainment
- Release date: 17 March 2021 (South by Southwest)
- Running time: 93 minutes
- Country: United Kingdom
- Language: Welsh
- Box office: $8,316

The Feast (Welsh: Gwledd) is a 2021 Welsh folk horror film directed by Lee Haven Jones from a screenplay by producer Roger Williams. Filmed in the Welsh language, the film stars Annes Elwy, Nia Roberts and Julian Lewis Jones. It premiered at the Official Selection of the 2021 South by Southwest and the same year was screened at the Fantasia International Film Festival.

== Plot ==
Whilst drilling for oil on a field, a worker stumbles away from his equipment and collapses on the ground, blood pouring from his ears.

A wealthy family — politician Gwyn, his wife Glenda, and their two adult sons, Guto and Gweirydd — host a dinner party at Glenda's inherited estate in the Welsh mountains. Their guests are to be Mair, a neighbouring farmer who grew up with Glenda, and Euros, a businessman who has been drilling for minerals on the family's land.

To help cater the party, Glenda has hired a girl named Cadi from the nearby village. Cadi arrives on foot at their remote estate, her hair is wet, and she rarely speaks. Cadi observes the family in silence as she helps Glenda prepare. One son, Guto, has a drug addiction. Early in the film, he accidentally drops an axe and cuts his foot. The other son, Gweirydd, is training for a triathlon and has an obsessive diet and regimen.

Elements of the family's lifestyle appear to upset Cadi. She becomes upset when Gwyn shoots a pair of rabbits and arrives with the dead rabbits to prepare them for supper. Cadi's emotional distress has physical consequences, for example a muddy stain appears on a clean tablecloth when she hears the gunshots. Gwyn experiences sudden pain and noise whenever he confronts Cadi. A bottle of wine explodes in Euros's hand when he arrives and accuses her of slacking off on the job. Afterwards, Cadi picks up a piece of broken glass and appears to insert it into her vagina.

When Guto asks Cadi if she has any drugs to help him get through the party, she takes him into the forest and helps him pick psychoactive mushrooms. He eats some of them before coming to dinner.

Mair arrives, signalling the start of the party. She explains that her husband, Iori, has been delayed by an emergency: an unknown person drove into a nearby lake, and he is helping to retrieve the car.

The atmosphere at the party is awkward. Mair is polite but put off by Glenda's behaviour. Gweirydd casts doubt on his father's recent health scare, embarrassing him in front of the guests. Guto expresses disgust at Gweirydd's raw-meat diet and his parents order him to leave the table. He goes back to his room, mixes and injects the remaining mushrooms.

Cadi, no longer needed, walks back into the forest and lays down in the grass, smiling as vines and flowers come alive and encircle her body, suggesting that her connection with nature is a magical one.

The party's true purpose is revealed. Gwyn, Glenda and Euros all hope to convince Mair to allow exploratory drilling and mining on her land. The most promising spot is "the Rise," but Mair points out this is the reputed resting place of a goddess in local folklore. Children are warned to avoid it; even adults refuse to disturb it for fear of waking her. Mair is horrified by the suggestion of mining the Rise and turns them down. Glenda accuses her of believing in superstition.

Meanwhile, Guto's entire leg has become necrotic and infested with maggots. Cadi seduces Gweirydd and leads him outside to the Rise, where Guto lies helplessly on the ground. Delirious with pain and addled by the drugs, Guto shares the real reason Gweirydd no longer works at the hospital: he raped a number of comatose female patients. Cadi pressures Gweirydd into cutting off his brother's leg with an axe. Cadi and Gweirydd then have sex against a tree, and Gweirydd screams in pain due to the sharp piece of glass still hidden in Cadi's vagina.

Back at the house, Mair receives a call from her husband and learns the car found in the pond was Cadi's. She and Glenda realize the woman who has been in Glenda's house all day is not the real Cadi — it is the goddess of the Rise possessing Cadi's drowned corpse. Mair flees, leaving Glenda to her fate.

The goddess returns to the house and kills Gwyn by inserting a skewer into his ear.

A badly injured Gweriydd arrives back at the house, carrying the now dead Guto on his shoulders, and soon collapses and dies from blood loss. Soon after, in an apparent trance, Glenda butchers Guto's body and serves the maggot-infested leg to the similarly entranced Euros, who is eating leftovers from the feast like a pig. Glenda puts the barrel of a shotgun in his mouth and asks him: "After you've taken everything, what will be left?" Glenda pulls the trigger and then slits her own throat.

The goddess returns home to the Rise and burns all the bodies.

== Cast ==
- Annes Elwy as Cadi
- Nia Roberts as Glenda
- Julian Lewis Jones as Gwyn
- Steffan Cennydd as Guto
- Sion Alun Davies as Gweirydd
- Caroline Berry as Delyth
- Rhodri Meilir as Euros
- Lisa Palfrey as Mair Bowen
- Chris Gordon as Worker

== Release ==
On 30 October 2019, Great Point Media joined American Film Market to sell world rights for The Feast. The UK distribution for theatrical release was acquired by Picturehouse Entertainment on 1 October 2020. On 29 April 2021, it was announced by IFC Midnight, a division of IFC Films, that it had acquired the rights to release The Feast in North America.

The film had its world premiere in the US at the South by Southwest film festival in March 2021. It was shown in the UK at the London Film Festival and opened the Abertoir Horror Festival in Aberystwyth, Wales, in the first week of November 2021. It went on general release in the US in November 2021, then in the UK in June 2022.

== Reception ==
On review aggregator website Rotten Tomatoes, the film has an 81% approval rating based on 69 reviews, with an average ranking of 6.9/10. The site's consensus reads: "Traditional horror may not be on the menu, but for fans of the gruesomely disquieting, The Feast more than lives up to its name". On Metacritic, the film has a weighted average score of 68 out of 100, based on 11 critics, indicating "generally favorable reviews".

David Rooney of The Hollywood Reporter had praised the film's visuals, calling them "elegantly creepy". He also praised the acting, which he called "solid", in addition to which, he added that "splashes of gore and the novelty of Welsh-language horror should hold the attention of genre lovers".

Jessica Kiang of Variety had enjoyed "the chilly control of Jones' filmmaking", which, according to her, was "enhanced by the pristine, deadened soundscape". She also found "Samuel Sim's atmospheric score, keeps our attention squirming on the hook.

Abby Olcese of RogerEbert.com cautioned that "Not everyone may have the patience for The Feast, but those who do will be rewarded with intelligence and grand guignol in equal measure".

According to Trace Thurman of Bloody Disgusting, "[the film] spends a bit too much time dawdling before the big climax (and it is a big climax), but it's well worth your time".

Matthew Monagle was of the same opinion, he wrote: "For as enjoyable as it is to watch the walls close in around Glenda and her family, it is the payoff itself that falls flat for The Feast".

Rue Morgue's Deirdre Crimmins suggested that "Whatever you do, decline all invitations to dinner parties. The Feast might not be original in arguing that last one, but it is confident and brutal enough to earn its own place at that table". Chad Collins of Dread Central wrote "While rough in parts, The Feast is a delightful, sumptuous dish from start to finish".
