= List of Gavin & Stacey episodes =

Gavin & Stacey is a British romantic situation comedy that follows the long-distance relationship of Gavin (Mathew Horne) from Billericay in Essex, England, and Stacey (Joanna Page) from Barry in the Vale of Glamorgan, Wales. The writers of the show, actors James Corden and Ruth Jones, also co-star as Gavin and Stacey's friends Smithy and Nessa, respectively. Other prominent cast members include Alison Steadman and Larry Lamb, who play Gavin's parents, Pam and Mick, and Melanie Walters and Rob Brydon, who portray Stacey's mother, Gwen, and her uncle, Bryn.

The show was produced by Baby Cow Productions for BBC Wales. It ran for a total of 22 episodes, broadcast from 13 May 2007 to 25 December 2024, comprising three series and three Christmas specials. Initially, the series was shown on BBC Three, but a growing following meant that it was subsequently moved to BBC One. The final two episodes of series three formed a significant part of the prime time BBC seasonal programming, and were broadcast on Christmas Day 2009 and New Year's Day 2010. A Christmas special was broadcast on Christmas Day 2019, and another special was shown on Christmas Day 2024, which concluded the show.

== Series overview ==
| Series | Episodes | Originally released | | Average UK viewers (millions) |
| Series | Episodes | First released | Last released | Average UK viewers (millions) |
|---|---|---|---|---|
| 1 | 6 | 13 May 2007 | 10 June 2007 | 0.96 |
| 2 | 7 | 16 March 2008 | 20 April 2008 | 1.62 |
| Special | | 24 December 2008 | | 7.19 |
| 3 | 6 | 26 November 2009 | 1 January 2010 | 7.65 |
| Special | | 25 December 2019 | | 18.49 |
| Special | | 25 December 2024 | | 20.90 |

== Episodes ==
=== Series 1 (2007) ===
| No. overall | No. in series | Title | Directed by | Written by | Original release date | UK viewers (millions) |
|---|---|---|---|---|---|---|
| 1 | 1 | "Episode 1" | Christine Gernon | James Corden & Ruth Jones | 13 May 2007 | 0.58 |
Gavin Shipman (Mathew Horne) and Stacey West (Joanna Page) decide to meet for the first time in Leicester Square in London after talking on the phone for some time, bringing along their best friends, Neil "Smithy" Smith (James Corden) and Nessa Jenkins (Ruth Jones) for support, and the two pairs end up in a hotel together for the night. Afterwards Gavin drives to Stacey's home in Barry and confesses his love to Stacey.
| 2 | 2 | "Episode 2" | Christine Gernon | James Corden & Ruth Jones | 13 May 2007 | 0.55 |
Gavin and Stacey are happy and in love, until a misunderstanding over the phone turns their lives upside down. With Stacey refusing to talk to him, Gavin travels to Barry for a second time to make up with her. However, when he arrives, Stacey's uncle Bryn West (Rob Brydon) is convinced he is a Jehovah's Witness. Stacey goes to stay at Gavin's for a couple of nights and he proposes to her at London Paddington station just as she is about to return to Wales.
| 3 | 3 | "Episode 3" | Christine Gernon | James Corden & Ruth Jones | 20 May 2007 | 0.55 |
Gavin and Stacey prepare to tell their friends and families about their surprise engagement. Gavin's parents, Mick (Larry Lamb) and Pam (Alison Steadman), are over the moon, while Stacey's family have some very big concerns over the announcement, and Smithy refuses to even talk to Gavin.
| 4 | 4 | "Episode 4" | Christine Gernon | James Corden & Ruth Jones | 27 May 2007 | 0.54 |
The Shipmans travel to Barry for a wedding fair. At the wedding fair, Smithy is completely mesmerised by Jammy the stag organiser (Matt Lucas), Bryn is completely sold on a magician for the wedding, and Gavin has to decide whether to go with the horse and carriage Stacey wants for the wedding or the Bentley he wants instead. Meanwhile, Nessa fears she may be pregnant.
| 5 | 5 | "Episode 5" | Christine Gernon | James Corden & Ruth Jones | 3 June 2007 | 1.74 |
It's Gavin and Stacey's stag and hen nights. Stacey is delighted when her brother Jason (Robert Wilfort) returns home, but there is bad history between him and Bryn. Meanwhile, Gavin finds out that Stacey has been engaged five times before, and Nessa is in two minds about whether to tell Smithy she may be pregnant.
| 6 | 6 | "Episode 6" | Christine Gernon | James Corden & Ruth Jones | 10 June 2007 | 1.83 |
The wedding day has finally arrived, with Gavin having forgiven Stacey's revelation. Nessa is unable to reveal her pregnancy to Smithy, who makes a fool of himself whilst performing the best man speech.

=== Series 2 (2008) ===
| No. overall | No. in series | Title | Directed by | Written by | Original release date | UK viewers (millions) |
|---|---|---|---|---|---|---|
| 7 | 1 | "Episode 1" | Christine Gernon | James Corden & Ruth Jones | 16 March 2008 | 1.89 |
Newlyweds Gavin and Stacey return from their honeymoon to a big welcome from both families. However, when Smithy joins them for a celebratory meal out, he seems none too happy with his best friend. As Nessa makes a shocking confession, a tearful Stacey realises she is about to leave home, and Mick and Pam's friends Dawn (Julia Davis) and Pete Sutcliffe (Adrian Scarborough) are distraught over their threeway situation, the entire evening slowly relocates to the restaurant toilets.
| 8 | 2 | "Episode 2" | Christine Gernon | James Corden & Ruth Jones | 16 March 2008 | 1.86 |
Smithy goes AWOL after hearing that he is going to be a father, so Gavin, Mick and Bryn attempt to track him down and persuade him to do the right thing. Meanwhile, Stacey is not pleased to hear of her mother Gwen's (Melanie Walters) new living arrangements, and begins feeling homesick before her life at the Shipmans has even begun.
| 9 | 3 | "Episode 3" | Christine Gernon | James Corden & Ruth Jones | 23 March 2008 | 1.49 |
Stacey is still adjusting to life as an Essex wife but perks up when it is time to go home to Barry, as Nessa and Smithy see their unborn baby for the first time. Meanwhile, Gwen's next-door neighbour, Doris O'Neill (Margaret John), makes a surprising proposition to Gavin.
| 10 | 4 | "Episode 4" | Christine Gernon | James Corden & Ruth Jones | 30 March 2008 | 1.79 |
Gavin and Stacey start house-hunting while Mick becomes a minor celebrity for the night after he was interviewed for a BBC News report after he found a dead body on his way to work. Nessa visits Stacey, and the pair of them, along with Gavin and Smithy, go bowling, where tension between the newlyweds starts to bubble over.
| 11 | 5 | "Episode 5" | Christine Gernon | James Corden & Ruth Jones | 6 April 2008 | 1.60 |
Bryn has arranged a special treat for Gwen's birthday, but he cannot handle the pressure and Gwen starts to get suspicious. Stacey tells Gavin a decision that will change their lives forever: she's moving back to Barry. Elsewhere, Nessa seems to have rekindled her romance with Dave Coaches (Steffan Rhodri)
| 12 | 6 | "Episode 6" | Christine Gernon | James Corden & Ruth Jones | 13 April 2008 | 1.40 |
While Stacey stays in Barry, Gavin goes home alone to Essex. Smithy takes Gavin for a boys' night out while Stacey goes to the bingo, but their mutual feelings become evident. Meanwhile, Bryn fears his fishing trip secret will be revealed as Dave, who he confided in whilst drunk, continues to charm Nessa, and the situation is made worse by Jason's presence in the house.
| 13 | 7 | "Episode 7" | Christine Gernon | James Corden & Ruth Jones | 20 April 2008 | 1.35 |
Stacey returns to Essex to sort things out with Gavin, but things are not looking good. In Barry, Nessa goes into labour a month early, leaving Gavin to find Smithy and get him to Barry in time for the birth.

=== Special (2008) ===
| No. overall | Title | Directed by | Written by | Original release date | UK viewers (millions) |
|---|---|---|---|---|---|
| 14 | "Christmas Special" | Christine Gernon | James Corden & Ruth Jones | 24 December 2008 | 7.19 |
It's Christmas and the Welsh contingent have been invited to celebrate the festive season with the Shipmans. With the help of Dave and his coach, Nessa and the Wests head east. Meanwhile, Gavin has secretly been in Wales to interview for a promotion based in Cardiff. After being offered the job, he agrees with Nessa that he and Stacey will move into Gwen's house. In Essex, Mick's preoccupied with the new love of his life – a handsome Norfolk turkey – and Smithy cannot wait to spend his first Christmas with baby Neil, but begins to feel side-lined by Dave's presence. Gavin announces his move and the ensuing argument culminates in Pete punching Dave after he makes a comment about Dawn. In the middle of the night, Bryn and Jason are about to reveal the details of the fateful fishing trip to Dave but are interrupted when Gavin walks in. Over Christmas dinner, Pam realises that everyone apart from Gwen knows she is not really a vegetarian. Dave proposes to Nessa, which she accepts, but Smithy privately tells her he thinks it would be a mistake. Mick plays "Have Yourself a Merry Little Christmas" on his new keyboard as they all sing together on Christmas night.

=== Series 3 (2009–10) ===
| No. overall | No. in series | Title | Directed by | Written by | Original release date | UK viewers (millions) |
|---|---|---|---|---|---|---|
| 15 | 1 | "Episode 1" | Christine Gernon | James Corden & Ruth Jones | 26 November 2009 | 6.41 |
Gavin starts his new job in Cardiff and Stacey is thrilled to be at home again. Smithy and Pam grieve for Gavin, while Nessa is adjusting to life in Dave's caravan down in Sully. The weekend brings with it a big reunion, as everyone meets up for the christening of baby Neil, where Gavin and Stacey decide to try for a baby themselves. Nessa's father, Neil Jenkins (Ifan Huw Dafydd), makes his first appearance, at the christening.
| 16 | 2 | "Episode 2" | Christine Gernon | James Corden & Ruth Jones | 3 December 2009 | 6.04 |
Following her and Gavin's decision to try for a baby, Stacey attempts to get a new job to earn extra money and is given a tough mock interview by Bryn. Meanwhile, Nessa takes baby Neil to see Smithy in Essex, which angers Dave who is left at home with Nessa's father. After a drunken night of beer and curry at Mick and Pam's, Smithy and Nessa wake up in bed together.
| 17 | 3 | "Episode 3" | Christine Gernon | James Corden & Ruth Jones | 10 December 2009 | 6.53 |
Smithy and his friends travel to Wales for a weekend of fun with Gavin, leaving Bryn's house overcrowded. Meanwhile, Stacey fears she may not be able to have children.
| 18 | 4 | "Episode 4" | Christine Gernon | James Corden & Ruth Jones | 17 December 2009 | 6.68 |
Gavin and Stacey visit the doctor where they learn that Gavin has a low sperm count. Pete and Dawn renew their vows with Smithy giving Dawn away, and Smithy offers to have sex with Stacey in order to be a sperm donor. Smithy and Dave have a confrontation at the reception, and Smithy tells Dave that he slept with Nessa.
| 19 | 5 | "Episode 5" | Christine Gernon | James Corden & Ruth Jones | 25 December 2009 | 10.00 |
When Pam and Mick arrive in Wales, everyone heads to Barry Island. Smithy makes an unexpected appearance and declares a truce with Dave regarding Nessa. Gavin and Stacey decide that they will keep trying for a baby until the New Year, and if they are unsuccessful they will look into other options.
| 20 | 6 | "Episode 6" | Christine Gernon | James Corden & Ruth Jones | 1 January 2010 | 10.25 |
Nessa and Dave's wedding day arrives. Stacey has some exciting news for Gavin – she's pregnant at last. Smithy walks in on the wedding and tells Nessa that she should not marry Dave because he knows the only reason she wants to marry Dave is so baby Neil has a father, which he already has in Smithy. Dave admits that he knows Nessa never loved him. The two of them shake hands, and Dave leaves the church.

=== Special (2019) ===
| No. overall | Title | Directed by | Written by | Original release date | UK viewers (millions) |
|---|---|---|---|---|---|
| 21 | "Christmas Special" | Christine Gernon | James Corden & Ruth Jones | 25 December 2019 | 18.49 |
Ten years on, the families prepare to celebrate Christmas together in Barry. Gavin and Stacey are now parents to three young children, son Harri and daughters Caitlin and Megan, and live next door to Gwen following Doris's death. Stacey worries that the excitement has gone from her marriage, and Nessa warns her to keep the flame alive. Smithy has a routine of visits to Wales to see his son Neil; these used to include casual sex with Nessa, but for the previous year he has been in a new relationship with Sonia (Laura Aikman). Gavin has been in Essex for a work event, and before the Shipmans leave for Barry, Smithy informs him of his plan to propose to Sonia, whom the families will meet for the first time over Christmas. Bryn has taken on the task of cooking Christmas dinner, which encompasses the three kitchens of his, Gwen's, and Gavin and Stacey's houses. Pam and Mick resolve Pete and Dawn's latest marital crisis which arose when Dawn found a cannabis joint belonging to Pete. The four then smoke the cannabis joint together, which leads Pam to forget to bring the Christmas puddings to Wales, after which the replacement puddings are left at the pub on Christmas Eve. Stacey reminds Gavin of the history of their relationship. Nessa and Smithy wake up together on Christmas morning, and Nessa confirms to Stacey that they had sex. Bryn and Jason narrowly avoid revealing all about the events of the fishing trip. When Sonia arrives, Smithy has a complete change of personality and starts speaking in an excessively formal way, complete with hypercorrections. Sonia makes offhanded negative comments about his weight, and fails to understand the dynamics of the two families. Ultimately, she insists on leaving early, but Smithy remains to be with Neil. Nessa tells Smithy he does not have to change for anyone, before shocking him by declaring her love for him and proposing.

=== Special (2024) ===
On 3 May 2024, Corden announced via his social media channels that he and Jones had completed writing the final episode of the show, which aired on Christmas Day 2024 on BBC One.

| No. overall | Title | Directed by | Written by | Original release date | UK viewers (millions) |
|---|---|---|---|---|---|
| 22 | "The Finale" | Christine Gernon | James Corden & Ruth Jones | 25 December 2024 | 20.90 |
Five years have passed and, after being interrupted by Gavin, Nessa and Smithy have never spoken about her proposal. Smithy went through with his proposal to Sonia, and the families unite for their wedding in Essex. However, the families privately express their concerns and Sonia makes no effort to integrate with them. Gavin and Stacey want to bring excitement back to their marriage through roleplay, but Gavin prefers the real Stacey. Neil prepares to begin an apprenticeship with Smithy, and Nessa plans to work on a cargo ship for six months having grown tired of the slow-paced life in Barry. The night before Smithy's stag night, the families drink excessively and miss most of the stag events the following morning. Both respective parties fall flat; the stag party fails to live up to the nostalgia of yesteryear, and the group does not gel well with Sonia's friends at the hen party. Pete and Dawn have divorced, but drunkenly reunite; Pete is subsequently unhappy with their agreement to resume their relationship. Gwen is acting secretively and eventually reveals that she has been in a six-month relationship with Dave Coaches, much to Bryn's disapproval. In a noisy confrontation with Bryn, Dave almost reveals the truth about the notorious fishing trip. At the wedding ceremony, Gavin voices his concerns about the wedding; after all of his guests concur, Smithy calls off the wedding and realises he wants to marry Nessa. The entire group races to Southampton Docks, from where Nessa is due to depart, on Dave's coach. Nessa accepts Smithy's proposal. The two marry in Barry with Gavin and Stacey's families in attendance.

== Ratings ==
Gavin & Stacey : UK viewers per episode (millions)

| Series | Episode number | | | | | | |
| Series | 1 | 2 | 3 | 4 | 5 | 6 | 7 |
|---|---|---|---|---|---|---|---|
| 1 | 0.58 | 0.55 | 0.55 | 0.54 | 1.74 | 1.83 | – |
| 2 | 1.89 | 1.86 | 1.49 | 1.79 | 1.60 | 1.40 | 1.35 |
| Special (2008) | 7.19 | – | | | | | |
| 3 | 6.41 | 6.04 | 6.53 | 6.68 | 10.00 | 10.25 | – |
| Special (2019) | 18.49 | – | | | | | |
| Special (2024) | 20.90 | – | | | | | |

Audience measurement performed by Broadcasters' Audience Research Board

== Other media ==
=== Outtakes special ===
| Title | Directed by | Written by | Original release date |
|---|---|---|---|
| "The Outtakes" | David Lambert | James Corden & Ruth Jones | 1 January 2010 |
Stars and writers Ruth Jones and James Corden look through the best outtakes from all three series and the 2008 Christmas Special.
