= List of most watched television broadcasts in the United Kingdom =

In the United Kingdom, viewing figures – the number of viewers or households watching a television programme – have been recorded by the Broadcasters' Audience Research Board (BARB) since 1981. Prior to the board's formation, figures were conducted by different means, such as the BBC financing its own audience research, while the ITV companies sub-contracted theirs.

== Most watched special events ==
The majority of special events attracting large audiences are often carried on more than one channel. The most watched special event programme of all time on a single channel in the UK is the 1973 wedding ceremony of Princess Anne, shown only on BBC One.

- Pre-1981 figures supplied by the British Film Institute (BFI)
- Post-1981 figures verified by the Broadcasters' Audience Research Board (BARB)

Rank	Event	Average audience (millions)	Date(s)	Network(s)
1	1966 FIFA World Cup final: England v West Germany	32.30	30 July 1966	BBC/ITV
2	Funeral of Diana, Princess of Wales	32.10	6 September 1997	BBC/ITV
3	Royal Family (documentary) Parts 1 & 2	30.69	21 June 1969 (Part 1) & 28 June 1969 (Part 2)	BBC/ITV
4	UEFA Euro 2020 final: Italy v England	29.85	11 July 2021	BBC/ITV
5	Apollo 13 Splashdown	28.60	17 April 1970	BBC/ITV
6	1970 FA Cup final replay: Chelsea v Leeds United	28.49	29 April 1970	BBC/ITV
7	Wedding of Prince Charles and Lady Diana Spencer	28.40	29 July 1981	BBC One/ITV
8	Wedding of Princess Anne and Mark Phillips	27.60	14 November 1973	BBC One
9	Prime Minister Boris Johnson's statement announcing a national lockdown due to the COVID-19 pandemic	27.10	23 March 2020	BBC/ITV/Channel 4/Channel 5/Sky News/S4C
10	State funeral of Queen Elizabeth II	26.20	19 September 2022	BBC/ITV/S4C/Sky News/Talk TV/GB News
11	Elizabeth II's COVID-19 address	24.50	5 April 2020	BBC/ITV/Channel 4/Channel 5/Sky News/S4C
12	2012 Summer Olympics closing ceremony	23.20	12 August 2012	BBC One/BBC Two

Notes:

- The Coronation of Elizabeth II (2 June 1953) was reportedly watched by more than 20 million households, with some figures cited as high as 27 million households, though this figure is before modern ratings were introduced.
- At least two Muhammad Ali boxing matches were reported to have been watched by at least 26 million viewers in the United Kingdom: the Fight of the Century (Ali vs. Frazier) was reported to have been watched by 27.5 million British viewers in 1971, and The Rumble in the Jungle (Ali vs. Foreman) was reported to have been watched by 26 million viewers on BBC in 1974.
- The wedding of Prince William and Catherine Middleton (29 April 2011) received a total average audience of 26 million viewers. This is a combined figure aggregated from the ten different channels that broadcast the ceremony. The highest figures of these were 13.59 million on BBC, with an extra 4.02 million watching on ITV.
- Boris Johnson's address on 23 March 2020 was simulcast to 14.61 million viewers on BBC, 5.80 million on ITV, and more than 6 million on other channels.
- The state funeral of Queen Elizabeth II (19 September 2022) was watched by an average audience of 18.5 million viewers on BBC channels.

== Most watched programmes ==
The following is a list of most watched programmes, excluding sporting events and news coverage. The mid-1980s introduction of in-week repeat showings accounts for six of the top ten programmes. On this measure, the 1996 Christmas edition of Only Fools and Horses is, not including figures for repeats, the most-watched non-documentary programme of all time so far in the United Kingdom. It is the third most-watched single-showing programme of all time so far on a single channel, behind the 2012 Summer Olympics closing ceremony and the wedding of Princess Anne and Mark Phillips in 1973 (see below).

- Post-1981 figures verified by the Broadcasters' Audience Research Board (BARB)
- Pre-1981 figures supplied by the British Film Institute

Key

† Numbers with this background and symbol are italicised to denote aggregated figure with repeat showing.

Rank	Programme	Synopsis	Viewers (millions)	Date	Network	Ref.
1	EastEnders	Den Watts serves his wife Angie with divorce papers.	30.15 †	25 December 1986	BBC1	
2	EastEnders	The aftermath of Den Watts serving his wife Angie with divorce papers.	28.00 †	1 January 1987	BBC1	
3	Coronation Street	Hilda Ogden leaves Weatherfield.	26.65 †	25 December 1987	ITV (Granada)	
4	Live Aid	16-hour concert in Wembley Stadium and John F. Kennedy Stadium for Band Aid.	24.50	13 July 1985	BBC2 then BBC1	
5	Only Fools and Horses	"Time on Our Hands"	24.35	29 December 1996	BBC1	
6	EastEnders	Arthur and Pauline Fowler urge their son Mark to tell his sister Michelle that he has HIV.	24.30 †	2 January 1992	BBC1	
7	Royal Variety Performance 1965	Featuring Dame Shirley Bassey, Peter Cook, Dudley Moore, and more.	24.20	14 November 1965	ITV (ATV)	
8	EastEnders	Angie Watts suffers a renal shutdown.	24.15 †	7 January 1988	BBC1	
9	To the Manor Born	Finale of the first series.	23.95	11 November 1979	BBC1	
10	Miss World 1967	Madeline Hartog-Bel (Miss Peru) wins.	23.76	19 November 1967	BBC1	
11	EastEnders	The aftermath of Den Watts serving his wife Angie with divorce papers.	23.55 †	26 December 1986	BBC1	
12	EastEnders	It is revealed that Lisa Shaw shot Phil Mitchell.	23.18 †	5 April 2001	BBC1	
13	Panorama	Diana, Princess of Wales interview	22.78	20 November 1995	BBC1	
14	Royal Variety Performance 1975	Performers include Bruce Forsyth, Dad's Army and Vera Lynn.	22.66	16 November 1975	ITV (ATV)	
15	This Is Your Life	Lord Mountbatten	22.22	27 April 1977	ITV (Thames)	
16	Sunday Night at the London Palladium	Presented by Jimmy Tarbuck.	21.89	3 December 1967	ITV (ATV)	
17	The Benny Hill Show	"Cinema: The Vintage Years"	21.67	24 March 1971	ITV (Thames)	
18	Dallas	"Who Done It" – Kristin Shepard is revealed to have shot J.R. Ewing.	21.60	22 November 1980	BBC1	
18	Coronation Street	Ken and Deirdre Barlow finalise their divorce.	21.60	8 January 1992	ITV (Granada)	
20	Eurovision Song Contest 1973	Staged in Luxembourg City – the UK was represented by Cliff Richard, and the contest was won by Anne-Marie David.	21.56	7 April 1973	BBC1	

=== Most watched films ===
These are the most watched films by total number of viewers (dates are when the films were broadcast, not necessarily when they were produced). The only film on this list not to be a premiere screening is Diamonds are Forever, which had been first shown on Christmas Day 1978.

Rank	Title	Viewers (millions)	Date	Network
1	Live and Let Die	23.50	20 January 1980	ITV (LWT)
2	Jaws	23.25	8 October 1981	ITV (Thames)
3	The Spy Who Loved Me	22.90	28 March 1982	ITV (LWT)
4	Diamonds Are Forever	22.15	15 March 1981	ITV (LWT)
5	Crocodile Dundee	21.75	25 December 1989	BBC1

== Most watched broadcasts by year ==
The viewing figures for this table come from the British Film Institute (BFI) until 1980 and Barb Audiences from 1981. Average audience is used, and all data is based on single channel viewership except where noted.

Year	Programme	Date	Viewers (millions)	Network
1959	Wagon Train	30 November 1959	13.63	ITV
1960	Data unavailable			
1961	Data unavailable			
1962	Data unavailable			
1963	News - Assassination of John F. Kennedy	22 November 1963	24.15 (Note: BFI lists a combined audience of 24.15 million on the BBC and ITV, but not the channels' separate ratings figures.)	
1964	Steptoe and Son: "The Lodger"	18 February 1964	21.54	BBC TV
1965	Royal Variety Performance 1965	14 November 1965	24.20	ITV (ATV)
1966	1966 FIFA World Cup final: England v West Germany	30 July 1966	32.30 (Note: BFI lists a combined audience of 32.30 million on BBC One and ITV, but not the channels' separate ratings figures.)	
1967	Miss World 1967	19 November 1967	23.76	BBC1
1968	Apollo 8 Splashdown	27 December 1968	22.55 (Note: BFI lists a combined audience of 22.55 million on BBC One and ITV, but not the channels' separate ratings figures.)	
1969	Royal Family (documentary)	21 June 1969 and 28 June 1969	30.69 (Note: BFI lists a combined audience of 30.69 million on BBC One and ITV, but not the channels' separate ratings figures.)	
1970	Apollo 13 Splashdown	17 April 1970	28.60 (Note: BFI lists a combined audience of 28.60 million on BBC One and ITV, but not the channels' separate ratings figures.)	
1971	Muhammad Ali vs. Joe Frazier: Fight of the Century	8 March 1971	21.12	BBC1 (Note: Unverified sources state that this figure was higher, and that an audience of 26 million watched the Ali vs Foreman fight of 30 October 1974. However these figures are not corroborated by the BFI.)
1972	Eurovision Song Contest 1972	25 March 1972	N/A (Note: Although there are no official figures for 1972, it is widely regarded that the year's edition of the Eurovision Song Contest was the most watched programme that year.)	BBC1
1973	Wedding of Princess Anne and Mark Phillips	14 November 1973	27.60	BBC1
1974	Love Thy Neighbour: "Eddie's Birthday"	7 April 1974	21.01	ITV (Thames)
1975	Royal Variety Performance 1975	16 November 1975	22.66	ITV (ATV)
1976	The Sweeney: "Sweet Smell of Succession"	8 November 1976	20.68	ITV (Thames)
1977	This Is Your Life: "Lord Mountbatten"	27 April 1977	22.22	ITV (Thames)
1978	Sale of the Century	24 December 1978	21.15	ITV (Anglia)
1979	To the Manor Born: "A Touch of Class"	11 November 1979	23.95	BBC1
1980	Film: Live and Let Die	20 January 1980	23.50	ITV (LWT)
1981	Film: Jaws	8 October 1981	23.30	ITV (Thames)
1982	Film: The Spy Who Loved Me	28 March 1982	22.90	ITV (LWT)
1983	Coronation Street	23 February 1983	18.45	ITV (Granada)
1984	Royal Variety Performance 1984	25 November 1984	20.55	BBC1
1985	Live Aid	13 July 1985	24.50	BBC1
1986	EastEnders	25 December 1986	30.15	BBC1
1987	EastEnders	1 January 1987	28.00	BBC1
1988	EastEnders	7 January 1988	24.15	BBC1
1989	Film: Crocodile Dundee	25 December 1989	21.77	BBC1
1990	Neighbours	26 February 1990	21.16	BBC1
1991	Coronation Street	25 November 1991	20.45	ITV (Granada)
1992	Coronation Street	22 January 1992	20.45	ITV (Granada)
1993	Coronation Street	22 March 1993	20.73	ITV (Granada)
1994	Torvill and Dean – Olympic Ice Dance Championship	21 February 1994	23.95	BBC1
1995	Panorama: "An Interview with HRH The Princess of Wales"	20 November 1995	22.78	BBC1
1996	Only Fools and Horses: "Time On Our Hands"	29 December 1996	24.35	BBC1
1997	Funeral of Diana, Princess of Wales	6 September 1997	19.29	BBC1
1998	1998 FIFA World Cup: England v Argentina	30 June 1998	23.78	ITV (Carlton)
1999	Coronation Street	7 March 1999	19.82	ITV (Granada)
2000	Coronation Street	3 January 2000	18.96	ITV (Granada)
2001	EastEnders	5 April 2001	23.18	BBC One
2002	Only Fools and Horses: "Strangers on the Shore"	25 December 2002	17.40	BBC One
2003	Coronation Street	24 February 2003	19.43	ITV1 Granada
2004	UEFA Euro 2004: England v Portugal	24 June 2004	20.66	BBC One
2005	Coronation Street	21 February 2005	14.36	ITV1
2006	2006 FIFA World Cup: England v Sweden	20 June 2006	18.46	ITV1
2007	EastEnders	25 December 2007	14.38	BBC One
2008	Film: A Matter of Loaf and Death	25 December 2008	16.15	BBC One
2009	Britain's Got Talent: "Final"	30 May 2009	18.29	ITV1
2010	The X Factor: "Final"	12 December 2010	16.55	ITV1 (Note: The X Factor final 2010 (12 December 2010) had an additional 1.156 million viewers on its sister high definition channel ITV HD, in addition to the 16.553 million views on the main standard definition channel ITV, giving the programme an aggregate audience of 17.71 million viewers.)
2011	Wedding of Prince William and Catherine Middleton	29 April 2011	13.59	BBC One (Note: The Royal Wedding of Prince William and Catherine Middleton (29 April 2011) "attracted a consolidated average audience of 26.0 [million] viewers across the ceremony from 11:00 am to 12:10 pm. This is an aggregated audience across 10 BARB reported channels that followed the events live." The highest figures for individual channels of these were 13.59 million on BBC One, followed by 4.02 million watching on ITV.)
2012	2012 Summer Olympics closing ceremony	12 August 2012	24.46	BBC One
2013	New Year's Eve Fireworks	31 December 2013	13.53 (Note: New Year's Eve Fireworks, 2013/2014 was aired on BBC One at 23:55 on December 31, 2013, making it a programme that spanned two years.)	BBC One
2014	2014 FIFA World Cup final: Germany v Argentina	13 July 2014	14.92	BBC One (Note: The 2014 FIFA World Cup final was broadcast by both BBC One and ITV. The highest figures were 14.96 million on BBC One, followed by 2.34 million on ITV.)
2015	The Great British Bake Off: "Final"	7 October 2015	15.05	BBC One
2016	The Great British Bake Off: "Royal Picnic"	26 October 2016	15.90	BBC One
2017	Blue Planet II: "One Ocean"	29 October 2017	14.01	BBC One
2018	2018 FIFA World Cup: Croatia v England	11 July 2018	20.73	ITV
2019	Gavin & Stacey: "2019 Christmas Special"	25 December 2019	17.92	BBC One
2020	Prime ministerial statement on COVID-19	10 May 2020	18.99	BBC One
2021	UEFA Euro 2020: England v Denmark	7 July 2021	18.40	ITV (Note: The Euro 2020 final between England and Italy was watched by an estimated 31 million across both BBC and ITV.)
2022	2022 FIFA World Cup: England v France	10 December 2022	16.08	ITV1
2023	Coronation of Charles III and Camilla	6 May 2023	12.04 (Note: New Year's Eve Fireworks, 2023/2024 recorded an average audience of 12.23 million. However, the programme was aired on BBC One at midnight on January 1, 2024, it should be classified as a 2024 programme.)	BBC One (Note: A combined total of 18.96 million people watched the 2023 coronation across multiple channels, including BBC, ITV, and Sky News.)
2024	Gavin & Stacey: "The Finale"	25 December 2024	19.11	BBC One
2025	The Celebrity Traitors: "Finale"	6 November 2025	14.94	BBC One
2026	The Celebrity Traitors: "Finale"	30 October 2026	15.92	BBC One
