= Get Me to the Church on Time =

Song
- Released: 1956 in My Fair Lady
- Genre: Musical theatre
- Composer: Frederick Loewe
- Lyricist: Alan Jay Lerner

"Get Me to the Church on Time" is a song composed by Frederick Loewe, with lyrics written by Alan Jay Lerner for the 1956 musical My Fair Lady, where it was introduced by Stanley Holloway.

It is sung by the cockney character Alfred P. Doolittle, the father of one of the show's two main characters, Eliza Doolittle. He has received a surprise bequest of four thousand pounds a year from an American millionaire, raising him to middle class respectability. Consequently, he feels he must marry Eliza's stepmother, the woman with whom he has been living for many years. Doolittle and his friends have one last spree before the wedding and the song is a plea to his friends not to let his drunken merriment forget his good intentions and make sure he gets to his wedding.

== Covers and parodies ==
- On the children's show Sesame Street, Oscar the Grouch and his girlfriend Grundgetta get engaged by accident, but they agree to get married anyway to have a huge trashy party. Amid the chaos of all the wedding preparations, Oscar sings "I'm Getting Married in the Trash Can", a spoof of "Get Me to the Church on Time". Also, the Elmo the Musical sketch "Airplane Pilot" has a penguin bride character who also sings a parody of the song called "Get Me to the Old South Pole".
- In 1975, in a season 9 episode of The Carol Burnett Show, the song is performed by Burnett (as an inebriated bride-to-be) with The Pointer Sisters.
- In the 2007 series 1 finale of Gavin & Stacey, Uncle Bryn is singing this song as he carries in the flowers for Gavin and Stacey's wedding, with Gwen, Nessa, and Stacey happily joining in.
- David Bowie's 1983 single "Modern Love" interpolates the song, with Bowie singing "Modern love gets me to the church on time".
- In the 2022 series finale of The Time Traveler's Wife, the attendees at the church wedding of title characters Clare and Henry join in when maid of honour Charisse and four other attendees surprise the group with a raucous rendition of the song at the end of the marriage ceremony.
- The Half Man Half Biscuit song "I'm Getting Buried in the Morning", from their 2022 album The Voltarol Years, is a murder ballad that ends with an execution, not a wedding. The lyrics of the chorus are: "I'm getting buried in the morning / So get me to the chair on time."

== Notable recordings ==
- André Previn and Shelly Manne - My Fair Lady (1956)
- Bing Crosby recorded the song in 1956 for use on his radio show and it was subsequently included in the box set The Bing Crosby CBS Radio Recordings (1954-56) issued by Mosaic Records (catalog MD7-245) in 2009.
- Julius La Rosa also released a recording of the song in 1956. It was the only version to reach the Billboard chart, reaching number 89 on the Top 100.
