= Margaret John =

Welsh actress (1926–2011)

- Margaret John as Bronwen Morgan in How Green Was My Valley (1960)
- Born: 14 December 1926; Swansea, Wales
- Died: 2 February 2011 (aged 84); Swansea, Wales
- Education: London Academy of Music and Dramatic Art
- Occupation: Actress
- Years active: 1956–2011
- Notable work: A Bit of Tom Jones?
- Television: Crossroads; The Boy Merlin; The District Nurse; Eyes Down; High Hopes; Gavin & Stacey; Game of Thrones
- Spouse: Ben Thomas (m. 1974; died 1978)

Margaret John (14 December 1926 – 2 February 2011) was a BAFTA award-winning Welsh actress. She is often remembered for her later roles in TV comedies such as Doris O'Neill in Gavin & Stacey and Elsie "Mam" Hepplewhite in High Hopes.

== Early life ==
Born in Swansea, as a child she wanted to be a nurse or vet, but she could not stand the sight of blood. She occasionally acted at school with her sister Mair. Spotted while acting in a chapel pageant competition, after an audition John trained at the London Academy of Music and Dramatic Art, graduating in 1950.

== Career ==
Margaret John's first public appearances were at Swansea's Grand Theatre, where she had small parts in weekly repertoire. Not being a fluent Welsh speaker, she found Welsh language productions challenging. After appearances on radio and in the theatre, she made her television debut in 1956 in a Welsh-language drama.

Her television roles included appearances on episodes of The First Lady, The Troubleshooters, Softly, Softly, The Mike Yarwood Show, Doomwatch, Blake's 7, Secret Army, Lovejoy, My Family, High Hopes, The District Nurse, Casualty and Doctors. On Radio 4, she appeared on Linda Smith's A Brief History of Timewasting and played Mrs Stone, the school secretary, in the original ten series of King Street Junior from 1985 to 1998.

In a career of over 50 years, she appeared in television programmes such as: Coronation Street, Dixon of Dock Green, Z-Cars, Doctor Who, Little Britain, Emmerdale, Last of the Summer Wine, Crossroads, Gavin & Stacey and The Mighty Boosh. In the early 1980s, she enjoyed a long run on ITV's daily soap opera Crossroads as doctors' receptionist Marian Owen. Between 2007 and 2010, she portrayed Doris in Gavin & Stacey.

At the 18th BAFTA Cymru Film, Television and Interactive Media Awards in 2009, John was presented with the Lifetime Achievement Award.

In September 2009, John appeared in the graphic short film Cow by director Peter Watkins Hughes warning of the dangers of texting while driving.

Also in 2009, John appeared in The Vagina Monologues; prior to that, she had not been on stage since the 1980s, when she appeared in Medea at London's Young Vic Theatre, with Dame Eileen Atkins. John subsequently appeared on stage in Calendar Girls at the Wales Millennium Centre from 27 July to 7 August 2010 and at Venue Cymru, Llandudno, from 9 to 14 August 2010, alongside fellow Welsh actress Ruth Madoc. She also starred in the 2009 film A Bit of Tom Jones?.

In March 2010, she appeared in the BBC One Wales programme Margaret John – National Treasure, which featured clips from the last 50 years of television and special guest interviews with, among others, Ruth Jones, Eve Myles and Joanna Page. The programme was broadcast again, in tribute to John, on 5 February 2011. She also featured in a short BBC video in which she cooked Welsh cakes for St. David's Day.

Her last appearance on screen, broadcast after her death, was in Game of Thrones as Old Nan.

== Personal life ==
Aged 48, she married Ben Thomas, a viola player with the London Symphony Orchestra who had performed with Frank Sinatra. He died aged 39, three years after they married, and she did not remarry. They had no children.

John regularly worked for charities, including Sport Relief, Children in Need, Comic Relief, the PDSA and the George Thomas Hospice. She was the face of the National Lottery AdvantAGE campaign, created to provide opportunities for older people.

== Death ==
John died at a hospital in Swansea on 2 February 2011 from liver cancer. Just before her death, Swansea University awarded her an Honorary Fellowship, in recognition of her long career.

== Selected film and television appearances ==
Year	Title	Role	Notes
1960	How Green Was My Valley	Bronwen	BBC adaptation
1967	Z-Cars	Betty Nutall	Episode: "When Did You Last See Your Father?"
1968	Doctor Who	Megan Jones	Serial: "Fury from the Deep"
1973	Seven of One	Mrs Owen	Episode: "I'll Fly You for a Quid"
1977	Last of the Summer Wine	Foggy's ladyfriend	Episode #26: "Who Made a Bit of a Splash in Wales Then?"
1977–1978	Pobol y Cwm	Clare Leyshon	Regular Role
1978–1984	Crossroads	Marian Owen	
1978	Blake's 7	Arbiter	Episode: "The Way Back"
1999–2008	High Hopes	Mrs Elsie Hepplewhite	
2005	The Mighty Boosh	Nanatoo	Episode: "Nanageddon"
2006	Doctor Who	Granny Connolly	Episode: "The Idiot's Lantern"
2007–2010	Gavin & Stacey	Doris O'Neill	
2007	Run Fatboy Run	Libby's Grandmother	
2009	A Bit of Tom Jones?		
2009	Cow	Joyce Richards	
2010	Skins	Eunice	Series 4, Episode 6: JJ
2010	Being Human	Old Lady	Episode: "Cure and Contagion"
2011	Game of Thrones	Old Nan	Posthumous release
