= Hard Labour (Play for Today) =

- Play for Today episode
- Episode no.: Series 3 Episode 20
- Directed by: Mike Leigh
- Written by: Mike Leigh
- Original air date: 12 March 1973

Episode chronology
| ← Previous "Access To The Children" | Next → "Man Above Men" |

"Hard Labour" is the 20th episode of third season of the British BBC anthology TV series Play for Today. The episode was a television play that was originally broadcast on 12 March 1973. "Hard Labour" was written and directed by Mike Leigh, produced by Tony Garnett, and starred Liz Smith in her first major role.

The episode is the most clearly drawn in all Leigh's work from the background in Higher and Lower Broughton where he grew up. "Though elements of autobiography are buried in all Leigh's films and plays, only Hard Labour is set in Salford, – the scenes in the Stones' house were shot in a house just two doors along from where the Leighs had lived in Cavendish Road."

== Cast ==
- Liz Smith as Mrs Thornley
- Clifford Kershaw as Mr Jim Thornley
- Polly Hemingway as Ann Thornley
- Bernard Hill as Edward Thornley
- Alison Steadman as Veronica Thornley
- Vanessa Harris as Mrs Lily Stone
- Cyril Varley as Mr Sid Stone
- Linda Beckett as Julie
- Ben Kingsley as Naseem
- Alan Erasmus as Barry
- Rowena Parr as June
- June Whittaker as Mrs Rigby
- Paula Tilbrook as Mrs Thornley's friend
- Keith Washington as Mr Shaw
- Louis Raynes as Tallyman
- Diana Flacks as Mrs Betty Rubens

== Theme ==
"The polarity between the worlds of Mrs Stone and the lady who cleans her house (the central figure, Mrs Thornley, the Catholic house-cleaner) is icily delineated. In the middle is the new housing estate, where Mrs Thornley's son, Edward, (played by Bernard Hill in his professional début), a car mechanic, lives with his wife Veronica (Alison Steadman)."
