= Let Them Eat Cake (TV series) =

British sitcom television series

- Let Them Eat Cake DVD cover
- Created by: Peter Learmouth
- Written by: Peter Learmouth
- Directed by: Christine Gernon
- Starring: Dawn French; Jennifer Saunders; Adrian Scarborough
- Composer: Nick Bicât
- Country of origin: United Kingdom
- Original language: English
- No. of series: 1
- No. of episodes: 6

Production
- Executive producers: Peter Bennett-Jones; Jon Plowman
- Producer: Christopher Skala
- Running time: 29 minutes
- Production company: Tiger Aspect Productions

Original release
- Network: BBC One
- Release: 9 September – 14 October 1999

Let Them Eat Cake is a British sitcom that aired on BBC One in 1999. Starring Dawn French and Jennifer Saunders, it is one of the few programmes in which French and Saunders have both appeared that they did not create themselves.

== Plot ==
It is 1782, seven years before the French Revolution. The most reviled woman in France is the ambitious and immoral Comtesse de Vache, who stalks the halls of the Palace of Versailles, spreading terror into the hearts of her fellow aristocrats by gathering their darkest and most intimate secrets. The Comtesse's servants are her maid, former sex worker Lisette, and her flamboyantly gay couturier, Bouffant. Her constant rival is Madame de Plonge, who is accompanied by her naïve yet sharp-witted daughter, Eveline.

== Cast ==
- Jennifer Saunders as Colombine, Comtesse de Vache
- Dawn French as Lisette
- Adrian Scarborough as Monsieur Bouffant
- Alison Steadman as Madame de Plonge (episodes 1, 2, 4, 6)
- Lucy Punch as Eveline de Plonge (episodes 1, 2, 4, 6)
- Elizabeth Berrington as Marie Antoinette (episodes 1, 4, 6)
- Julian Rhind-Tutt as Marie Antoinette's Advisor (episodes 1, 4, 6)
- Linda Spurrier as 1st Aristocratic Woman (episodes 2, 3, 6)
- Maggie Whiting as 2nd Aristocratic Woman (episodes 2, 3, 6)

Steadman was credited as a "special guest star" despite appearing in four of the six episodes.

=== Guest stars ===
- James Greene as the Comte de Vache (episodes 1 & 4)
- Adam James as the Marquis de Bonvie (episode 1)
- Philip Voss as Physician (episode 1)
- Richard E. Grant as Monsieur Vigée-Lebrun (episode 3)
- Maggie Steed as Madame Vigée-Lebrun (episode 3)
- Kathy Burke as Cecile (episode 5)
- Louisa Lytton as Little Girl (episode 5)

== Episodes ==
No.	Title	Directed by	Written by	Original release date
1	"The Pox"	Christine Gernon	Peter Learmouth	9 September 1999
Madame de Plonge tries to humiliate the Comtesse de Vache by convincing her to seduce one of her lovers. Meanwhile, the Comte de Vache has contracted the pox and wishes to end his life pressed against Colombine's bosom.
2	"Murder"	Christine Gernon	Peter Learmouth	16 September 1999
Colombine loses a bet against the Marquise de Fufu and is arrested after the Marquise is found brutally murdered in her apartment.
3	"The Portrait"	Christine Gernon	Peter Learmouth	23 September 1999
The Marquis de Sade has escaped from the Bastille and it seems that Colombine has become a favoured victim of his depravities. Meanwhile, a famous artist wants to paint Colombine. Guest starring Richard E. Grant and Maggie Steed.
4	"Making Voopee"	Christine Gernon	Peter Learmouth	30 September 1999
Colombine believes herself to be pregnant and thinks the King to be the father. She then conspires to do away with the King's legitimate son so that her own will become heir to the throne of France.
5	"A Marriage of Convenience"	Christine Gernon	Peter Learmouth	7 October 1999
A Duke is offering a vast sum to anyone who can provide him with a "show wife," which he needs to appear to be one of the lads. Colombine tries to enlist her estranged sister, Cecille (played by Kathy Burke), for the job.
6	"The Royal Command Performance"	Christine Gernon	Peter Learmouth	14 October 1999
The King and Queen have decided to hold a Royal Command Performance, consisting basically of them copulating, and Colombine does her best to outshine her nemesis, Madame de Plonge.

== DVD releases ==
Let Them Eat Cake was released in Region 2 (UK) and Region 4 (Australia) on 5 March 2007.
