= Alison Steadman =

British actress (born 1946)

Alison Steadman OBE
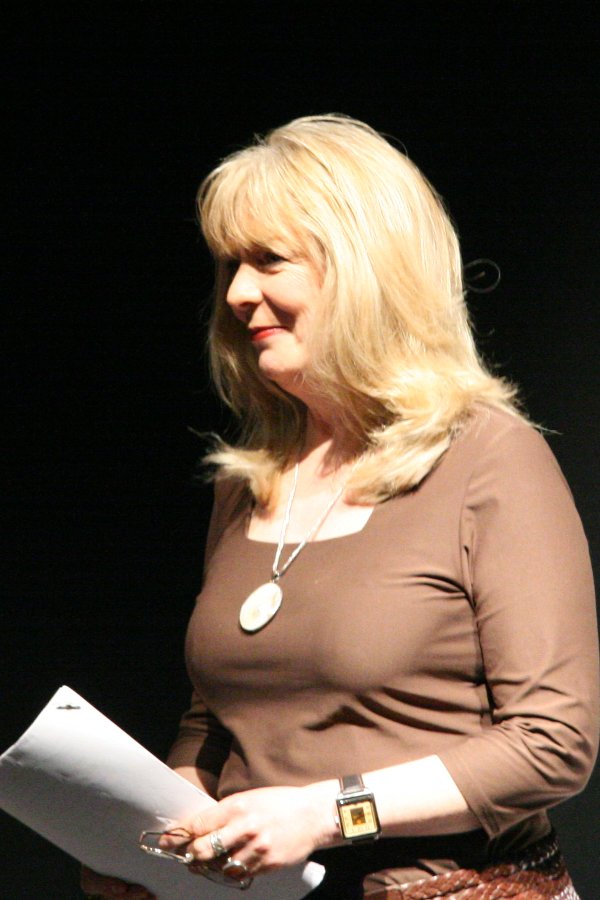
- Steadman during a recording of You'll Have Had Your Tea for BBC Radio 4 in 2006
- Born: 26 August 1946 (age 80); Liverpool, England
- Education: East 15 Acting School
- Occupation: Actress
- Years active: 1968–present
- Spouse: Mike Leigh (m. 1973; div. 2001)
- Partner: Michael Elwyn
- Children: 2
- Steadman's voice recorded 2012, as part of an audio description of the pelicans in St James's Park for VocalEyes

Alison Steadman (born 26 August 1946) is an English actress. She received the 1977 Evening Standard Theatre Award for Best Actress for Abigail's Party, the 1991 National Society of Film Critics Award for Best Actress for the Mike Leigh film Life Is Sweet and the 1993 Laurence Olivier Award for Best Actress for her role as Mari in the original production of The Rise and Fall of Little Voice. In a 2007 Channel 4 poll, the '50 Greatest Actors' voted for by other actors, she was ranked 42.

Steadman made her professional stage debut in 1968 and went on to establish her career in Mike Leigh's 1970s TV plays Nuts in May (1976) and Abigail's Party (1977). She received BAFTA TV Award nominations for the 1986 BBC serial The Singing Detective and in 2001 for the ITV drama series Fat Friends (2000–2005). Other television roles include Pride and Prejudice (1995), Gavin & Stacey (2007–2010, 2019, 2024) and Here We Go (2022–present). Her other film appearances include Clockwise (1986), Blame It on the Bellboy (1992), Confetti (2006), Burn Burn Burn (2015) and Better Man (2024).

== Early life and education ==
Steadman was born in Liverpool, the youngest of three sisters born to Marjorie (née Evans) (1912–1996) and George Percival Steadman (1912–1991), who worked as a production controller for Plessey, an electronics firm.

Steadman was educated at Childwall Valley High School for Girls, a state grammar school in the Liverpool suburb of Childwall, followed by East 15 Acting School, at which she secured a place in the autumn of 1966 and where she met Mike Leigh during her second year.

== Career ==
=== Stage work ===
Having left the East 15 Acting School in Loughton, Essex, Steadman worked in various regional repertory theatres, starting at Lincoln in 1968, where her first role was the schoolgirl Sandy in The Prime of Miss Jean Brodie. She created the role of the monstrous Beverly in Mike Leigh's Abigail's Party, which she reprised with the original cast on television. She won an Olivier Award for The Rise and Fall of Little Voice and also appeared in Cat on a Hot Tin Roof, Entertaining Mr Sloane, Hotel Paradiso, and others in locations as diverse as the Royal Court, the Theatre Royal, the Old Vic, the Hampstead Theatre, the Nottingham Playhouse, the Everyman Liverpool and the National Theatre. She starred as Elmire in the 1983 RSC production of Molière's Tartuffe, which was adapted for BBC television. 2002 saw her play the role of Hillary in Debbie Isitt's The Woman Who Cooked Her Husband at the West End's Ambassadors Theatre to widely positive reviews. In 2010 Steadman played Madame Arcati in a revival of Noël Coward's Blithe Spirit. In 2014 Steadman appeared as Madame Raquin in Helen Edmundson's adaptation of Emile Zola's Thérèse Raquin.

=== Film ===
Steadman has appeared in many films, including P'tang, Yang, Kipperbang (1982), Champions (1983), A Private Function (1984), Number One (1984), Clockwise (1986), Stormy Monday (1988), The Adventures of Baron Munchausen (1988), Shirley Valentine (1989), Wilt (1989), Life Is Sweet (1990), Blame It on the Bellboy (1992), Topsy-Turvy (1999), The Life and Death of Peter Sellers (2004), Confetti (2006), Burn Burn Burn (2015), Dads Army (2016) and 23 Walks (2020).

=== Television ===
Steadman is credited with sharing the first lesbian kiss on British television with Myra Frances. Broadcast on 25 February 1974, Girl is the story of the love affair of two WRAC soldiers. "When I was first offered the part I felt quite nervous," she said and was relieved that her "mum said it was great and was very moved by it."

An early television appearance came in 1976 which saw Steadman cast as Cheryl Baker in the Granada Television daytime series Crown Court. Her character was the secretary of a confidence trickster found guilty of fraud.

Television productions directed by Leigh in which she has appeared in the 1970s include Nuts in May, Hard Labour and Abigail's Party. She also appeared in the BBC comedy The Worst Week of My Life. In 2007 she featured in the BBC Wales programme Coming Home about her Welsh family history, with roots in Trefarclawdd and Ruabon.

Other television work includes Fat Friends as Betty, Grumpy Old Women, Stressed Eric, Let Them Eat Cake, The Singing Detective, No Bananas, The Caucasian Chalk Circle, Adrian Mole: The Cappuccino Years as Pauline Mole, opposite James Bolam in the television film The Missing Postman, and Pride and Prejudice as Mrs. Bennet. In 1991, she also appeared as Edda Göring in Selling Hitler and as Lauren Patterson in Gone to the Dogs, which was then followed up by Gone to Seed.

In October 2007 Steadman appeared in Fanny Hill on BBC Four.

From May 2007 to January 2010 Steadman starred in the BBC comedy Gavin & Stacey as Pam Shipman. She returned to the role for the Christmas specials in 2019 and 2024 respectively. She appeared in Lewis as the Reverend Martha Steadman in "Intelligent Design" in 2013.

In 2014 Steadman starred as Joyce in the first series of the BBC comedy Boomers, followed by a Christmas special in 2015 and a second series in 2016. In 2016 she presented the three-part series Little British Islands with Alison Steadman on Channel 4. The series visited Gigha, Jura, Colonsay and Oronsay in episode 1, Jersey, Alderney and Sark in episode 2 and the Isles of Scilly in episode 3. In 2016 she appeared as Abigail in the Midsomer Murders episode "The incident at Cooper Hill".

In 2018 Steadman made a return to BBC One with John Cleese in Hold the Sunset. On 9 December 2018 Steadman appeared in the BBC One drama Care in the role of Mary. Also in 2018 she featured in ITV1 mini-series Butterfly, where she played Maxine Duffy’s grandmother.

=== Radio ===
On radio, Steadman's talent for mimicry and character voices was given full rein in the 1970s, mainly at BBC Manchester, in comedy sketch shows including Week Ending, Castle's on the Air and The Worst Show on the Wireless. In the second and third of these she played the over-protective mother to Eli Woods's long-suffering Bunty/Precious. From 1982 to 1984, also at BBC Manchester, she joined Eli Woods and Eddie Braben (Morecambe and Wise's scriptwriter) in 13 episodes of the radio comedy The Show with No Name, written by Braben. In the early to mid 1980s Steadman also had a spell in Roy Hudd's long-running comedy sketch series The News Huddlines. From 2002 she co-starred as Mrs Naughtie in the situation comedy series Hamish and Dougal. In December 2009 she starred in Mike Stott's My Mad Grandad on BBC Radio 4. From 2012 she played Ginny Fox, a parody of Virginia Woolf, in the sitcom Gloomsbury. In 2018 she made a guest appearance in Radio 4's The Archers as Olwen, a friend of Jill Archer.

== Personal life ==
Blue plaque to Mike Leigh and Alison Steadman

In 1972 director Mike Leigh drove to Liverpool to see Ted Whitehead's play The Foursome, which featured Steadman. He asked her to be in his film Hard Labour, during which, both said, they "got together". They married in 1973 and had two sons. The couple lived with their sons in Wood Green, London. They separated in 1995 and divorced in 2001.

Steadman's partner is actor Michael Elwyn. The couple live in Highgate, London.

She is a birdwatcher and in November 2016 became an ambassador for London Wildlife Trust. Steadman's memoir, Out of Character, was published in 2024.

== Filmography ==
=== Film ===
Year	Title	Role	Notes
1976	Nuts in May	Candice Marie	TV film
1977	Abigail's Party	Beverly	TV film
1980	Moving Pictures	Mrs Arnolfini	TV film
1982	P'tang, Yang, Kipperbang	Miss Land	TV film
1983	Tartuffe, or the Impostor	Elmire	TV film
1984	Champions	Mary Hussey	
1984	A Private Function	Mrs Allardyce	
1984	Number One	Doreen	TV film
1985	The Caucasian Chalk Circle	Kato / Natella / Aniko	TV film
1985	Coming Through	Kate	TV film
1986	Clockwise	Gwenda Stimpson	
1987	The Finding	Mum	TV film
1987	The Short & Curlies	Betty	TV short film
1988	Coming Through	Kate	TV film
1988	Stormy Monday	Mayor	
1988	The Adventures of Baron Munchausen	Daisy	
1989	Shirley Valentine	Jane	
1989	Wilt	Eva Wilt	
1990	Life Is Sweet	Wendy	
1992	Blame It on the Bellboy	Rosemary Horton	
1994	Degas and Pissaro Fall Out	Emma Dumay	Short film
1996	Secrets & Lies	Dog Owner	
1996	The Snow Queen's Revenge	Pearl	Voice role
1997	The Missing Postman	Christine Peacock	TV film
1997	The Ugly Duckling	The Hen	Voice role
1998	Queen's Park Story	The Squirrel	TV short film. Voice role
1999	Topsy-Turvy	Madame Leon	
1999	Santa's Last Christmas	The Sorceress	TV film. Voice role
2001	Chunky Monkey	Beryl	
2001	Happy Now?	Bronwyn Race	
2001	Bob the Builder: A Christmas to Remember	Bunty Ferguson (The Mayoress)	Video. Voice role (UK dub)
2001	Ivor the Invisible	Auntie Barbara	TV film. Voice role
2002	D.I.Y. Hard	Woman	Short film
2003	Philip Larkin: Love and Death in Hull	Narrator	Voice role
2003	Hans Christian Andersen: My Life as a Fairytale	Mrs. Meisling	TV film
2004	Bosom Pals	Joan	TV film. Voice role
2004	The Life and Death of Peter Sellers	Casting Agent	
2005	Bob the Builder: Bob's Big Plan	Bunty Ferguson (The Mayoress)	TV film. Voice role (UK dub)
2005	The Housewife	Narration / The Housewife	Short film
2006	Confetti	Sam's Mum	
2006	Dead Rich	Maggie	Short film
2006	Loony in the Woods	Crazy Butcher	
2007	The Dinner Party	Juliet	TV film
2007	Who Gets the Dog?	Jenny Evans	TV film
2009	Second Chance	Billie Shackleton	Short film
2010	Come Rain Come Shine	Dora Mitchell	TV film
2012	A Civil Arrangement	Isobel	TV film
2012	The Day My Nan Died	Jean	Short film
2012	Notes	Allison	Short film
2014	Peterman	Auntie Jean	
2015	Burn Burn Burn	Diana	
2016	Dad's Army	Mrs Fox	
2017	French Exchange	Mrs Phillips	Short film
2017	We Can Be Heroes	Granny Evans	
2017	Yours Faithfully Edna Welthorpe (Mrs)	Edna Welthorpe	Short film
2018	Bertie	Ann	Short film
2018	Ghosted	Alison	Short film
2018	Care	Mary	TV film
2018	Three Sacks Full of Hats	Mum	Short film
2019	Off Grid	Grace Tanner	Short film
2020	23 Walks	Fern	
2020	Roald & Beatrix: The Tail of the Curious Mouse	Dora	TV film
2021	The King's Man	Rita	
2024	Better Man	Betty	
2024	Picky	Julie	Short film
2025	Stitch Head	Nan	Voice role

=== Television ===
Year	Title	Role	Notes
1971	Bel Ami	Fencer	Episode: "Madeleine"
1973	Z-Cars	WPC Bayliss	2 episodes: "Suspicion" and "Nuisance"
1973–1974	Frost's Weekly	Various roles	7 episodes
1973–1981	Play for Today	Various roles	9 episodes
1974	Crown Court	Mary Chatham	3 episodes: "Good and Faithful Friends: Parts 1–3"
1974	Second City Firsts	Jackie	Episode: "Girl"
1975	Second City Firsts	Helen	Episode: "Early to Bed"
1975	Tarbuck and All That!	Various roles	Series regular
1975	Oil Strike North	Paula Webber	Episode: "First Lion"
1975	The Wackers	Bernadette Clarkson	7 episodes
1976	Crown Court	Cheryl Baker	3 episodes: "Scard: Parts 1–3"
1976	Red Letter Day	Margaret Hudson	Episode: "Bag of Yeast"
1977	Esther Waters	Sarah	3 episodes
1978	ITV Playhouse	Norma Hardy	Episode: "Ten Days That Shook the Branch"
1979	Two's Company	Pamela	Episode: "The Silence"
1985–1987	Nature in Focus	Helen	12 episodes
1986	The Singing Detective	Mrs. Lili Marlow	Mini-series, 5 episodes
1986	In Sickness and in Health	Mother	Episode: "Christmas Special"
1989	Screen Two	Brenda Ogdon	Episode: "Virtuoso"
1989	The Jim Henson Hour	Perriwinkle	Episode: "Monster Maker"
1989	Screenplay	Marjorie	Episode: "A Small Mourning"
1990	Screen One	Jackie Johns	Episode: "News Hounds"
1991	Selling Hitler	Edda Goering	Mini-series, 1 episode
1991	Gone to the Dogs	Lauren Patterson	Mini-series, 6 episodes
1992	Gone to Seed	Hilda	Series regular, 6 episodes
1994	The Wimbledon Poisoner	Elinor Farr	Mini-series, 2 episodes
1995	Kavanagh QC	Evelyn Marie Kendall	Episode: "Nothing But the Truth"
1995	Pride and Prejudice	Mrs. Bennet	Mini-series, 6 episodes
1995	Coogan's Run	Annette	Episode: "The Curator"
1995–1998	Crapston Villas	Marge Stenson	Series regular, 20 episodes
1996	Karaoke	Mrs. Haynes	Mini-series, 2 episodes
1996	Cold Lazarus	Mrs. Haynes	Mini-series, 1 episode
1996	No Bananas	Evelyn Hamilton	Series regular, 10 episodes
1998–2000	Stressed Eric	Mrs. Perfect	Series regular, voice role, 13 episodes
1999	Let Them Eat Cake	Madame de Plonge	4 episodes
2000–2005	Fat Friends	Betty Simpson	Series regular, 23 episodes
2001	Adrian Mole: The Cappuccino Years	Pauline Mole	Series regular, 6 episodes
2002	Celeb	Grandma	Episode: "The Love Child"
2003	Lenny Henry in Pieces	Various roles	4 episodes
2003	Comic Relief	Professor Minerva McGonagall	Sketch: "Harry Potter and the Chamberpot of Azerbaijan"
2004	Dalziel and Pascoe	Marion Mattis	Episode: "Soft Touch"
2004–2005	The Lenny Henry Show	Mrs. Twelvetrees	2 episodes
2004–2006	The Worst Week of My Life	Angela Cook	Series regular, 17 episodes
2005	Twisted Tales	Margery Faversham	Episode: "Fruitcake of the Living Dead"
2005	Bob the Builder	Bunty Ferguson (The Mayoress)	Voice role (UK dub). Episode: "Bob's Big Plan"
2007	The Last Detective	Karen Horner	Episode: "The Man from Montevideo"
2007	Agatha Christie's Marple	Kirsten Lindstrom	Episode: "Ordeal by Innocence"
2007	Fanny Hill	Mrs. Brown / Madam	2 episodes: "#1.1" and "#1.2"
2007	The Omid Djalili Show	Mrs. Dashett	Episode: "#1.2"
2007–2010, 2019, 2024	Gavin & Stacey	Pam Shipman	Main role; 22 episodes
2012	Playhouse Presents	Tina	Episode: "King of the Teds"
2012	Inspector George Gently	Esther Dunwoody	Episode: "The Lost Child"
2012	Little Crackers	Alison's Mum; Mrs. O'Grady	Episode: "Alison Steadmans Little Cracker: The Autograph"; Episode: "Paul O'Grady's Little Cracker: Boo! A Ghost Story"
2013	Lewis	Rev. Martha Seager	2 episodes: "Intelligent Design: Parts 1 & 2"
2013	The Syndicate	Rose Wilson	Series regular, 6 episodes
2013	Love and Marriage	Pauline Paradise	Series regular, 6 episodes
2014	Comedy Blaps	Mum	Episode: "A Liam Williams 'Blap': Episode 3 – Home"
2014	The Great War: The People's Story	Hallie Miles	Mini-series, 3 episodes
2014	The Secrets	Angela	Episode: "The Dilemma"
2014–2016	Boomers	Joyce	Series regular, 13 episodes
2015	Inside No. 9	'Madam Talbot' / Anne	Episode: "Séance Time"
2015–2016	Orphan Black	Kendall Malone	5 episodes
2016	Midsomer Murders	Abigail Tonev	Episode: "The Incident at Cooper Hill"
2016	Yonderland	Barbara Maddox	Episode: "It's the Thought That Counts"
2016	Comedy Playhouse	Brenda	Episode: "Broken Biscuits"
2017	Comedy Playhouse	Cath	Episode: "Static"
2017	We Have Been Watching	Narrator	Series regular
2018	Butterfly	Barbara	Mini-series, 3 episodes
2018	The Reluctant Landlord	Debbie	Episode: "Mama's Boy"
2018	The Crystal Maze	Fairy God Mumsie	Episode: "Celebrity Christmas Special"
2018–2019	Hold the Sunset	Edith	Series regular, 13 episodes
2019	Moominvalley	Emma the Stage Rat	Voice role, 2 episodes: "Little My Moves In" and "Moominsummer Madness"
2020	Unprecedented	Liz's Mum	Episode: "#1.3"
2020	Housebound	Jane	Episode: "#1.12"
2020	Life	Gail Reynolds	Mini-series, 6 episodes
2020	Pandemonium	Sue Jessop	BBC One comedy (pilot episode of Here We Go)
2022	Rules of the Game	Anita Jenkins	Mini-series, 4 episodes
2022–present	Here We Go	Sue Jessop	8 episodes (including pilot and 2023 Christmas Special)
2024	Quentin Blake's Box of Treasures	Mrs. Armitage	Voice role, Episode: "Mrs. Armitage on Wheels"
2026	The Baddies	Witch	Upcoming voice role

== Awards and nominations ==
- 2000: Invested as Officer of the Order of the British Empire

Year	Work	Awards	Category	Result
1987	The Singing Detective	BAFTA TV Awards	Best Actress	Nominated
1991	Life Is Sweet	Taormina International Film Festival Awards	Golden Mask	Won
1992	Life Is Sweet	National Society of Film Critics Awards	Best Actress	Won
1993	The Rise and Fall of Little Voice	Olivier Awards	Best Actress	Won
1996	Pride and Prejudice	CableACE Awards	Best Supporting Actress in a Movie or Miniseries	Nominated
1998	The Memory of Water	Olivier Awards	Best Actress	Nominated
2001	Fat Friends	BAFTA TV Awards	Best Actress	Nominated
2016	N/A	British Independent Film Awards	Richard Harris Award	Won
2025	Better Man	AACTA International Awards	Best Supporting Actress	Nominated
