= List of Gavin & Stacey characters =

Main characters (left to right) Bryn (Rob Brydon), Gwen (Melanie Walters), Nessa (Ruth Jones), Stacey (Joanna Page), Gavin (Mathew Horne), Smithy (James Corden), Pam (Alison Steadman) and Mick (Larry Lamb)

Gavin & Stacey is a British television comedy series, following the lives of the title characters Gavin (Mathew Horne) and Stacey (Joanna Page). Stacey lives in Barry, South Wales. Her best friend is Nessa Jenkins (Ruth Jones). Gavin lives in Billericay, Essex. His best friend is Neil "Smithy" Smith (James Corden). During the first two series Gavin lives with his parents Mick (Larry Lamb) and Pam (Alison Steadman). In the third series, he has moved in with Stacey and Stacey's mother, Gwen (Melanie Walters). Uncle Bryn (Rob Brydon) lives directly opposite.

== Characters ==
= Main cast (credited)
= Recurring cast
= Guest cast

Character	Portrayed by	Series				
Character	Portrayed by	Series 1 (2007)	Series 2 (2008)	Series 3 (2009–10)	Special (2019)	Special (2024)
Main
Gavin Shipman	Mathew Horne	Main	Main	Main	Main	Main
Stacey Shipman (née West)	Joanna Page	Main	Main	Main	Main	Main
Neil "Smithy" Smith	James Corden	Main	Main	Main	Main	Main
Vanessa "Nessa" Jenkins	Ruth Jones	Main	Main	Main	Main	Main
Michael "Mick" Shipman	Larry Lamb	Main	Main	Main	Main	Main
Pamela "Pam" Shipman	Alison Steadman	Main	Main	Main	Main	Main
Brynfor "Bryn" West	Rob Brydon	Main	Main	Main	Main	Main
Gwen West	Melanie Walters	Main	Main	Main	Main	Main
Recurring
Dawn Sutcliffe	Julia Davis	Recurring	Recurring	Recurring	Featured	Featured
Peter "Pete" Sutcliffe	Adrian Scarborough	Recurring	Recurring	Recurring	Featured	Featured
Jason West	Robert Wilfort	Recurring	Recurring	Recurring	Featured	Featured
Doris "Dor" O'Neill	Margaret John	Recurring	Recurring	Recurring		
Dirtbox	Andrew Knott	Recurring	Guest	Guest		Featured
Budgie	Russell Tovey	Recurring	Guest	Guest		Featured
Fingers	Samuel Anderson	Recurring		Guest		Featured
Dave Coaches	Steffan Rhodri	Guest	Recurring	Recurring		Featured
Chinese Alan	Dominic Gaskell	Guest	Guest	Guest		Featured
Gary	Jason Gregg	Uncredited	Uncredited	Guest		Featured
Simon	Daniel Jeffrey	Uncredited	Uncredited			Featured
Ruth "Rudi" Smith	Sheridan Smith		Recurring	Recurring		Featured
Deano	Mathew Baynton		Recurring	Recurring		
Neil Noel Edmond "the baby" Smith	Scarlett Humphreys		Uncredited			
Neil Noel Edmond "the baby" Smith	Lewis Merchant		Guest			
Neil Noel Edmond "the baby" Smith	Cari Kiernan		Guest			
Neil Noel Edmond "the baby" Smith	Ewan Kennedy			Recurring		
Neil Noel Edmond "the baby" Smith	Oscar Hartland			Recurring	Featured	Featured
Neil Noel Edmond "the baby" Smith	Rocco Romanello			Guest		
Catherina "Cath" Smith	Pam Ferris			Recurring		Featured
Neil "the father" Jenkins	Ifan Huw Dafydd			Recurring		
Sonia	Laura Aikman				Featured	Featured

=== Main characters ===
- Gavin Shipman (Mathew Horne) – Gavin is an only child, and still lives with his loving father and doting mother in Billericay, Essex. He works for a company called ICB and spends his spare time with his best friend Smithy along with his other friends Gary & Simon, Dirtbox, Fingers, Budgie, Swede, Chinese Alan and Jesus. He is a big fan of Tottenham Hotspur (as is Horne) and is often seen wearing his Spurs shirt. In the course of his job, he had to deal with a company called Bedmores, based in Barry. The Bedmores representative he had to correspond with was a woman called Stacey West, who was asked to order Thermal Fins for the company computers, as described in the show's supplementary book. The pair found they got on very well and after months of talking and flirting, they decided to meet in London. They agreed that Gavin would bring his best friend Smithy, and Stacey would bring her best friend Nessa. They met up, went clubbing and had sex. When Stacey and Nessa boarded the coach back to Wales, Gavin took a taxi home, jumped in his car and drove to Barry from Essex, meeting Stacey when her coach arrived in Barry. The two quickly told each other that they were in love and, within nine weeks, they were engaged and married. Gavin, along with his father Mick, often play the "straight men" in the series, baffled and frustrated by the antics of their family and friends. Gavin's main personality flaw is that he is slightly spoiled, possibly due to being an only child, and gets irritated when he does not get his way. He is not always sensitive; when Stacey, who is very attached to her hometown, gets depressed and homesick upon moving to Billericay, Gavin is more dismissive and confused than he is concerned. Gavin is also less willing to discuss his private life than his wife. He finds it odd that Stacey is so eager and ready to spill intimate details to Nessa, Bryn, her mother and her brother. Despite these differences, Gavin loves Stacey enormously, demonstrating this by finding a job in Wales so he can move to Barry, despite previously expressing a dislike for it. In Series 3, he agrees with Stacey to try to have a baby, only to discover she had not been on the pill for a year. Although he is very angry about Stacey not telling him the truth, he becomes much more depressed when he learns that he has fertility problems. They decide to carry on trying to conceive for a few months, and they should start looking at alternatives afterwards. In the final episode, Stacey discovers she is pregnant, and Gavin is just as thrilled as she is. In the 2019 Christmas special, Gavin is now a father of three children, son Harri and daughters Caitlin and Megan, living in Barry with Stacey.
- Stacey Shipman (née West) (Joanna Page) – Stacey is 26 and is from Barry, near Cardiff. Her father, Trevor, died three years ago, and she lived at home with her mother in Barry until her marriage. Her gay brother, Jason, lives in Spain. She had been engaged five times before meeting Gavin Shipman, something she preferred to forget and kept from him. She is very bubbly, excitable and full of conversation but also slightly fragile and prone to overreacting. An example is her misreading Gavin's sudden businesslike tone during a call from work when his boss appears over him, immediately thinking he is trying to break up. Gavin then has to drive all the way to Barry to patch things up. She confides frequently in her best friend, Nessa. Stacey has never been away from Barry before she visits Gavin, and becomes very homesick when she marries him and moves to Essex. After a few months of finding no work, she tells Gavin she can no longer live in Essex and will be moving back home. During the course of their separation, Stacey decides their selfishness about where they live means they are not meant to be together and is on the verge of giving her wedding ring back when Nessa goes into labour. After Nessa gives birth, they make up and resolve to find a way for both of them to be happy. A few months later, Gavin decides to get a job in Cardiff so he can move to Barry Island to keep Stacey happy. Stacey discovers she is pregnant in the final episode of Series 3, after desperately taking a large number of pregnancy tests. In the 2019 Christmas special, Stacey is now a mother of three children, son Harri and daughters Caitlin and Megan, living in Barry with Gavin.
- Neil Noel Edmunds "Smithy" Smith (James Corden) – Smithy is 28 and Gavin's best friend, and they've known each other since primary school. He is a self-employed builder and decorator. He is very protective of Gavin – he is disappointed when Gavin gets engaged to Stacey and when Gavin and Stacey go on honeymoon, he calls Gavin every day for the 3 weeks they are there, and gets angry at Gavin for leaving his phone off. He loves Gavin's parents more than his own, and has an unseen girlfriend called Lucy, who, according to Smithy, is seventeen and three quarter years old. He loves unusual beer, paintball and West Ham United. When Nessa gives birth to their son they name him Neil after Smithy himself and Nessa's father. In the series finale, Smithy stops Nessa's wedding but far from declaring his feelings for her he says that if she needs a father for Neil he's there and thus she doesn't need to marry unless she loves Dave, thus causing Nessa and Dave not to get married. He is shown to have obvious similarities to Nessa, such as: refusing to share food, being very upfront, protective of their best friends, and they like most of the same food and drink, such as KFC, corn on the cob, and Irn-Bru. Smithy wears his heart on his sleeve and is given to intense public displays of emotion, and will cry or sulk with little provocation. Smithy eats, drinks and smokes to excess and is overweight. At the time of the 2019 Christmas special he has a girlfriend Sonia though this relationship disintegrates over the course of the episode. At the end, Nessa proposes to him. In the 2024 special, it is revealed that Smithy went through with proposing to Sonia and left Nessa hanging. However, five years later, Smithy realises how much he loves Nessa instead and proposes to her after running out on his own wedding. Nessa accepts and the two are married.
- Vanessa Shanessa "Nessa" Smith (née Jenkins) (Ruth Jones) – Nessa is Stacey's best friend, also from Barry. She discovers she is pregnant in the fourth episode of Series 1 and it is later revealed that Smithy is the father following the second time they were intimate at Pam and Mick's house. She speaks fluent Italian and Welsh, has several tattoos, most notably a large red dragon on her right upper arm. She is a chain smoker (except during her pregnancy) and was one of the original members of All Saints (but didn't get along with Shaznay). She works at the Barry Island Amusement Arcades or "The Slots". Nessa regularly recalls strange and often lewd experiences with celebrities. She gives birth to baby Neil in the finale of Series 2 and becomes engaged to Dave Coaches in the 2008 Christmas special. In the series finale, Smithy declares his feelings for Nessa at her wedding, and Dave accepts that Nessa never really loved him, always replying "I Know" when he told her he loved her, and that he was the father figure that Smithy will now be. Nessa's age is unknown throughout the show until the 2019 Christmas Special when it is implied that she is 55 years old. Her catchphrases include "Ohhhh", "Tidy", "Genuine", "Truth be told", "Immense", "I'm not gonna to lie to you", "What's occurring?" and on occasion "What's Appertaining?" In the third series, it was discovered that she is an Aston Villa fan. She has jet black bob-style hair and wears Gothic style make up. She is serious, outgoing, and surprisingly intelligent at times. She has had a number of interesting occupations including being a BBC radio producer, a roadie for "The Who", and driving trucks for Eddie Stobart (who gave her two trucks to keep when she left,) and a running feature of the programme is her wide range of impressive occupations, abilities (apart from speaking fluent Italian she is an excellent ten pin bowler) and acquaintance or relationships with various famous people. In the 2019 Christmas Special it appears Nessa's life has continued in much the same way throughout the 2010s as it did during the original series' while bringing up her son. She proposes to Smithy at the end of the episode. However, it is revealed in the 2024 special that Nessa was left hanging and Smithy proposed to his girlfriend Sonia. Five years after the proposal, Nessa decides to leave Barry Island as she can't deal with Smithy getting married. However, Smithy calls off his wedding to Sonia after realising he loves Nessa and she is approached by him and their friends as she is about to leave. Smithy proposes to Nessa who accepts and they are married.
- Michael "Mick" Shipman (Larry Lamb) – Mick is Gavin's father; a down-to-earth bloke, like his son. He's happy with his life – running his own company, playing golf and going to the pub quiz every Tuesday. He genuinely loves his wife, Pam, his stability and cool head contrasting her often frantic and scatter-brained approach to life. That said, he's not above finding some wry enjoyment in Pam's self-made disasters unfolding in front of them both.
- Pamela Andrea "Pam" Shipman (née Gryglaszewska) (Alison Steadman) – Pam is Gavin's proud and doting mother. She is in her fifties, though her exact age is unknown as, according to her husband, she has claimed to be 51 on her past five birthdays. She is a stereotypical Essex wife and is very house-proud. She is also very caring of Smithy, Gavin's best friend, and treats him as if he were her own son. Pam adores Queen Camilla (who was Duchess of Cornwall at the time) and she refers Diana, Princess of Wales as a "hussy". She acts out sexual fantasies of Charles and Camilla with her husband, Mick. She dotes on Gavin, who she calls her "Little Prince". She is very welcoming of Stacey into the family – the first time Stacey meets her, she helps her with a pimple on her face, in a motherly fashion, which allows the two to bond. She is horrified when Gavin and Stacey announce they're moving back to Barry and she accuses Stacey of 'stealing' her son. She apologises the next morning for overreacting. Pam is prone to using eggcorns, such as saying "ours is not to question while" (instead of "why") or "Barry's Island" instead of "Barry Island". She is often nervous and excitable and this leads her into awkward social situations, such as forcing Mick to go food shopping in response to an attack of paranoia about her guests' dietary requirements, and then falsely claiming to be newly vegetarian (a pretence she is forced to maintain, much to her frustration because she craves meat) to explain why he has arrived with several bags of vegetarian food. Her catchphrases include "Oh My Christ", "I panicked (name)" and "Mick! Michael!"
- Brynfor "Bryn" West (Rob Brydon) – Bryn is Stacey and Jason's uncle. He is the brother of Stacey's deceased father, Trevor and is a single man in his late forties. He lives across the road from Stacey and his sister-in-law, Gwen and is very protective of them. In Series 1 and 2, he had a strained relationship with his nephew Jason due to an unspecified but clearly disturbing incident on a fishing trip. He leads a very simple life and often gets excited about trivial things such as his Sat Nav or the Internet. He also enjoys typically female-orientated TV shows such as Desperate Housewives and Sex and the City. He is a keen singer and sings with Stacey's best friend, Nessa. In Series 2, he puts a home gym in his house that is "the talk of the street". Bryn also displays latent homosexual tendencies but is seemingly too innocent and childlike to address them. For instance, Bryn converted one of the bedrooms in his home into a gym and invites Smithy over where they strip shirtless and have a close workout followed by a "warm down" that involves rubbing each other. Smithy does not see this as a sexual thing at all, even though it makes Gavin uncomfortable. It has been implied a number of times that Bryn was abused by his brother Trevor as a child, such as Trevor leaving him terrified on a ghost train or hanging him by his ankles and swinging him against rocks, resulting in two broken arms. He claims he "rather enjoyed the experience" as it was only "tomfoolery" but it shocks everyone and horrifies Pam.
- Gwen West (Melanie Walters) – Gwen is Stacey and Jason's mother. She is a widow in her late forties and has two children, Jason and Stacey. She is a housewife and regularly offers to cook omelettes. She's a caring, kind woman who lets herself be taken advantage of by Stacey's best friend, Nessa. She's very close to Stacey as they spent many years living together. In Series 3, Stacey and her husband Gavin move back in with Gwen. On the day of Nessa's wedding, Nessa told Gwen that she was like a mother to her before kissing her on the lips, which gobsmacks Gwen but does not affect Nessa. In the 2024 special, it is revealed that she has begun a relationship with Dave.

=== Other characters ===
- David "Dave Coaches" Lloyd Gooch (Steffan Rhodri) – Coach driver in Barry and Nessa's fiancé, after they got engaged in the Christmas special. Aspersions are cast regarding his sexual health in Series 1, although it is revealed in Series 2 that he has been to "the clinic". He is the only person, other than Bryn and Jason, who knows what happened on the fishing trip, after Bryn told him to get the matter off his chest. His relationship with Nessa results in both Bryn and Jason being incredibly nervous about him telling their friends what happened, although he makes it very clear to Bryn he wouldn't tell anyone about it. He also has his own company named Dave's Coaches. He often shows jealousy towards Smithy for being the father of Nessa's child. Smithy gets jealous of him for always spending time with his son and treating him like his own. In the final episode he leaves Nessa at the altar as he doesn't believe she loves him. Nessa's father mentions him having "blood on his hands", but says he was joking, knowing that "nothing was proven". Dave often has a strained relationship with the other characters, and has publicly had angry exchanges with Bryn, Smithy and Pete, who punched Dave in the face after he made an uncharitable remark about his wife, Dawn. In the 2024 special, it is revealed that he has begun a relationship with Gwen.
- Jason West (Robert Wilfort) – Stacey's elder brother, son of Gwen and her late husband, Trevor. He is gay and lives in Spain with his boyfriend. He and Bryn share a rather awkward relationship due to some mysterious goings-on on the fateful fishing trip. Although the events of the fishing trip are never explicitly revealed, it is strongly implied that there was a close and intimate encounter between Jason and Bryn. When they attempt to explain to Dave the reason for what they did that night, Bryn says "It was freezing cold...and when you're that cold you-" before being cut off by Gavin entering the room. He is disappointed in the first series when Gavin and Stacey get married and he is not chosen to take Stacey down the aisle. He and Bryn eventually become friends again, something they are both glad about.
- Peter "Pete" Sutcliffe (Adrian Scarborough) and Dawn Sutcliffe (Julia Davis) – Friends of Pam and Mick's. They have a very strained marriage and regularly insult each other in public. They have two children, Fiona and Alex. Also part of the ongoing joke that characters share their surnames with serial killers – in this case Peter Sutcliffe, the Yorkshire Ripper. He punches Dave in the Christmas special. He also attempts a threesome at the beginning of Series 2 with his wife Dawn and a man named Seth. It didn't work out as Seth said the photo they sent him was not representative of them as a couple. The couple renewed their vows in Series 3, but got into a fight over Pete's choice of ring before the end of the ceremony. By the final episode they have divorced, but reunite after a drunken party at Pam and Mick's. Pete wishes for this to be a one-off, but is coerced by Dawn into resuming their relationship.
- Catherina "Cath" Smith (Pam Ferris) – Smithy and Rudi's mother who first appears in the first episode of Series 3. She is rumoured to have had a lesbian relationship with the headteacher of Gavin and Smithy's primary school. She claims to suffer from narcolepsy, though Pam attributes this to her excessive drinking. She attends single mother support groups and has been known to perform lewd acts on webcam, having once accidentally exposed herself to Nessa thinking she was a man named John.
- Doris "Dor" O'Neill (Margaret John) – Gwen's elderly next door neighbour. She looks like a stereotypical "little old lady", in sharp contrast to her behaviour and blunt, profanity-littered conversational style. Doris regularly dates younger men, even offering herself up to Gavin for "discreet" extramarital relations, and is described by Bryn as "a player". She has a daughter named Moira, whom she loathes and would like to "smother" if she saw her again. Gwen even goes so far as to say "she was a nasty piece of work". Doris is a Catholic as mentioned in S1 Ep 2, and her surname suggests that she is of Irish descent. It is Doris who mentions the unfortunate coincidence of Gavin and Stacey sharing the West and Shipman surnames with serial murderers Fred and Rose West and Harold Shipman. In the Christmas Special, it is mentioned that Doris has since died, in which the group toast to her memory while gathered at the pub.
- Ruth "Rudi" Smith (Sheridan Smith) – Smithy's sister, also likes to be called "Smithy" in an attempt to imitate and irritate her brother, with whom she often fights.
- Neil Noel Edmund Smith aka Neil, the Baby (Lewis Merchant (Christmas Special 2008), Ewan Kennedy (Series 3), Oscar Hartland (Series 3 – Christmas Special 2024) – The son of Smithy and Nessa, named after both Smithy himself and Nessa's father. His middle names come from Smithy's uncle Edmund and Nessa's friend Noel from Hear'Say. In the 2019 Christmas special, he is an eleven-year-old schoolboy.
- Neil Jenkins (Ifan Huw Dafydd) – Nessa's father; appears at the Christening but is obviously uncomfortable at being back in Barry due to unknown previous events. He is a part-time actor who has appeared as an extra in Lark Rise to Candleford and as a man in a coma in Holby City.
- Dick Powell (Gwynfor Roberts) The only exclusively Welsh-speaking inhabitant of Barry. Sells items on the black market such as satellite navigation systems and meat that his brother steals from the slaughterhouse where he works. He enjoys chicken and Glamorgan sausage sandwiches.
- Owain Hughes (Steven Meo) – one of Gavin's co-workers at his new job in Cardiff in Series 3. Constantly the subject of an unclear joke that seems to be understood only by the Welsh: "My name is Owain Hughes and before you ask, no I don't!".
- Sonia (Laura Aikman) – Smithy's girlfriend who first appears in the 2019 Christmas Special. In the 2024 Christmas special, Smithy is about to marry her before realising, in the ceremony, that he loves Nessa instead.
- Harri, Caitlin and Megan Shipman (Gabriel Mitell, Martha Tregonning, Maddison Belle Platt) – Gavin and Stacey's three children who first appear in the 2019 Christmas Special. They share names with Prince Harry, Duke of Sussex, Catherine, Duchess of Cambridge and Meghan, Duchess of Sussex.

==== Gavin and Smithy's Friends ====
- Deano (Mathew Baynton) – Works with Smithy and is known for being gormless and somewhat naïve. He learnt Welsh prior to coming over to Wales with the "Essex Lads". He wasn't at Gavin's stag, but got a T-shirt made afterwards when they went to the foam party. Among his idiosyncrasies is a fondness for drinking a mixture of equal parts tea and coffee, which he calls a "toffee" or a "cea" (pronounced "key").
- Karl "Budgie" Barratt (Russell Tovey) – He is nicknamed as such because he has big ears; his full name is revealed on the table plan at Gavin and Stacey's wedding at the end of Series 1. He has a brother called Magpie, who works as a DJ. In the 2019 Christmas special, Smithy states that Budgie is now a grandfather.
- Chinese Alan (Dominic Gaskell) – His catchphrase is "Someone order a Chinese?"
- Craig "Fingers" (Samuel Anderson) – Named because of his womanizing attitude. He has an on-off relationship with Stacey's friend, Louise.
- Dominic "Dirtbox" (Andrew Knott) – Is somewhat short tempered and snappy. In the 2019 Christmas special Smithy states that Dirtbox is recently divorced.
- Jesus (Daniel Curtis) – Only appears in the stag episode; most likely because no one in the group really seems to like him.
- Swede – (John Grisley) – He rarely says anything.
- Gary (Jason Gregg) – He has been friends with them since primary school. He is never seen without his best friend Simon – Gavin even answering a phone call using both names – except for in Series 3, where it appears they have had an argument.
- Simon (Daniel Jeffrey) – He has been friends with them since primary school. He is never seen without his best friend Gary; but he does not appear in Series 3, as it appears he has had an argument with Gary.
- Luggy (Uncredited) – He has glasses and is quite tall. He is relatively quiet when compared to the rest of Gavin's friends as he is often seen in the background of the conversation and has no dialogue. He is not seen in Series 3 for unknown reasons.

=== Minor characters ===
- Seth – Swinger who responded to Dawn and Pete's request for a threesome partner, he later backed out because the picture of Dawn and Pete was 15 years old.
- Gruffydd (Griff) Lloyd (Alan David) – friend of Bryn and Doris. He attended Gavin and Stacey's wedding with Doris in Series 1.
- Father Chris (William Thomas) – A vicar in Barry who conducts Gavin and Stacey's wedding, and Neil The Baby's christening. He is rather short-tempered.
- José Pavarez (Matt Johnson) – Jason's boyfriend, who attends Gavin and Stacey's wedding.
- Jammy (Matt Lucas) – stag party organiser who Smithy meets at a wedding fair in episode four of series one. Jammy convinces Smithy to arrange a stag weekend in Prague that he will also attend, which Gavin vetoes.
- Edna Sutcliffe (Edna Doré) – Pete's mother, only seen once in the Christmas Special, where Pete forgot her and she stayed behind the bar overnight. She is mentioned as having died by the 2019 Christmas special.
- Celebrant (Anna Maxwell Martin) – at Smithy and Sonia's abandoned wedding.
- Celebrant (Rakie Ayola) – at Smithy and Nessa's wedding.
- Betty (Hazel Douglas) – A neighbour of Pam and Mick. She is only seen talking to Pam about Mick's short stint on a news broadcast.
- Scott – One of Doris' much younger boyfriends, whom she casually describes as "a bit of a pothead".
- Natalie Lewis – Sales assistant whose brother and father once had a fight with Nessa
