= Barb Audiences =

Television ratings in the United Kingdom

Broadcasters' Audience Research Board
- Founded: 1981; 45 years ago
- Type: Television ratings, audience measurement
- Location: United Kingdom
- Website: barb.co.uk

Barb Audiences Ltd (formerly Broadcasters Audience Research Board) is a British organisation that compiles audience measurement and television ratings in the United Kingdom. It was created in 1981 to replace two previous systems whereby ITV ratings were compiled by JICTAR (Joint Industry Committee for Television Audience Research), whilst the BBC did its own audience research.

BARB is jointly owned by the BBC, ITV, Channel 4, Channel 5, Sky and the Institute of Practitioners in Advertising. It is a Joint Industry Currency.

In February 2023, Barb changed its company name to Barb Audiences Ltd (formerly Broadcasters' Audience Research Board).

== Methodology ==
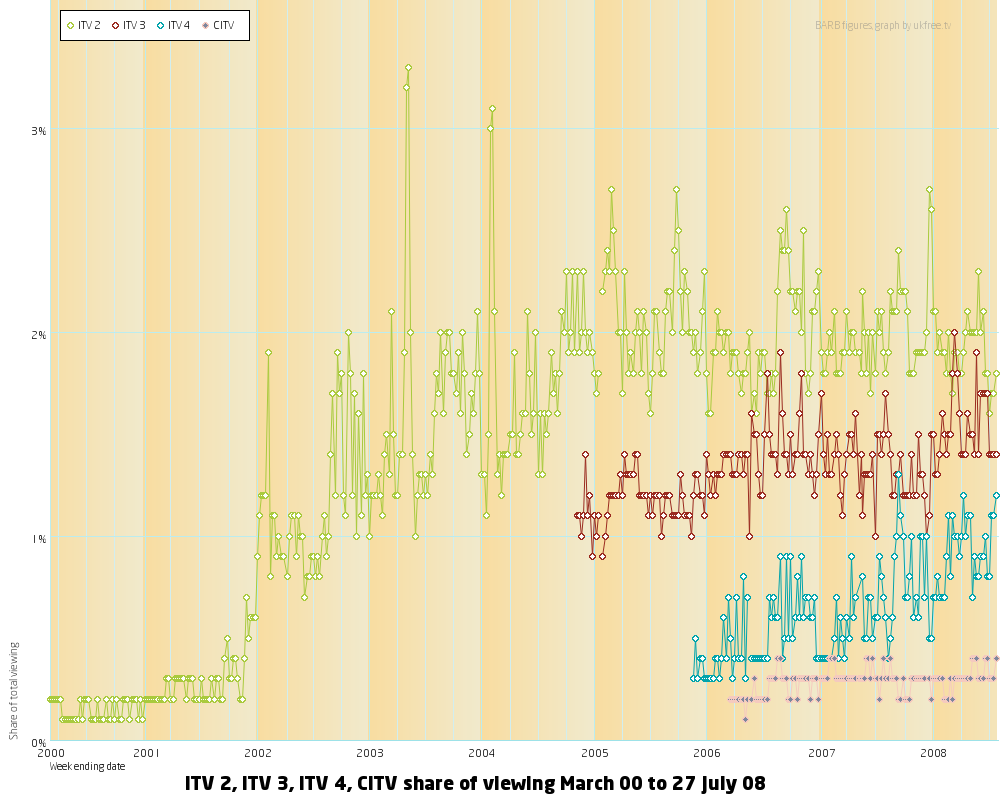
ITV digital channels' viewing share 2000–2008

Barb has two sources of data: people-based panel data and device-based census data for online TV viewing.

The Barb panel is a sample of households, selected by geography, demographics and TV platforms, to mirror the UK. In July 2024, Barb completed its panel expansion to 7000 UK homes, comprising approximately 16,000 people. This means that with a total UK population of 67,026,292, according to the 2021 census, each viewer on the Barb panel represents approximately 4189 people. The Barb panel provides information on who is in front of the screen and the type of people they are.

A meter is attached to each TV set in Barb panel homes. People in these homes use a special remote control with dedicated buttons for each household member (and guests) to confirm who's watching. They press the buttons when they leave or come back into the room. To determine what is being watched, the TV-set meters take audio samples of the sounds on panellists' TV sets and convert these to digital fingerprints. Every night, Barb retrieves the fingerprints and matches them to a reference library of TV content.

There is also a meter attached to the WiFi router in panel homes to track viewing of subscription video-on-demand (SVOD) and video-sharing services by any member of the household on any device.

Barb also captures device-based big data whenever anyone in the UK watches a broadcaster's video-on-demand (BVOD) service on a connected device.

Barb combines panel data and device-based data in a process called Dovetail Fusion.

The data is collected overnight and published as overnight ratings at around 9.30 the following morning for use by TV stations and the advertising industry. Barb also reports catch-up viewing that happens up to seven days after the original broadcast, referred to as the consolidated ratings. From 2013, Barb has reported viewing that takes place up to four weeks after the original broadcast.

In November 2021, Barb began to report audiences for subscription video-on-demand services such as Amazon Prime Video, Disney+ and Netflix and video-sharing platforms such as TikTok, Twitch and YouTube.

In July 2025, Barb began reporting TV-set viewing to YouTube channels.

Barb publishes weekly top 50 shows and a monthly viewing summary on its website.

== Data gathering ==
In 2021, Barb awarded new research contracts to start in January 2024 and run until the end of 2029.

Barb appointed Kantar to install new metering technology into the Barb panel of homes. Barb also re-appointed Kantar to collect device-based census data. ABC was re-commissioned to independently audit the implementation of tagging software that generates this big-data set.

Barb appointed RSMB to deliver services that ensure its audience measurement is based on high-quality survey design and methodology.

At the same time, Barb extended Ipsos's contract for conducting Barb's Establishment Survey.

Barb's services are supported by two other contracts: Dovetail Fusion data integration (conducted by Kantar) and provision of a content identification system (MetaBroadcast).

In January 2023, Barb awarded three contracts for its audience measurement service: metadata and interim overnight programme logs to MetaBroadcast and interim overnight commercial spot logs to Clearcast.

In January 2025, Barb commissioned two prototypes and two new data sources for Barb Panel Plus.

In February 2025, Barb appointed MediaSense and Snowflake for the new Barb Data Hub.

In March 2025, Barb appointed RSMB to build a single interface for Advanced Campaign Hub and CFlight.

== See also ==
- List of most watched television broadcasts in the United Kingdom
- Audience measurement
- Nielsen ratings
- RAJAR
