= Adrian Scarborough =

British actor

- Born: Adrian Philip Scarborough; Melton Mowbray, Leicestershire, England
- Years active: 1993–present
- Spouse: Rose Blackshaw
- Children: 2

Adrian Philip Scarborough is a British actor. He has appeared in films including The Madness of King George (1994), Gosford Park (2001), Vera Drake (2004), The History Boys (2006), The King's Speech (2010), Les Misérables (2012) and 1917 (2019). He is also known for his roles in television such as Cranford (2007–2009), Gavin & Stacey (2007–2024), Upstairs Downstairs (2010–2012), The Paradise (2013), Crashing (2016), A Very English Scandal (2018), Killing Eve (2019), and The Chelsea Detective (2022–present).

Scarborough is also a theatre actor and has twice won the Laurence Olivier Award for Best Actor in a Supporting Role; he won in 2011 for his role in the Terence Rattigan's play After the Dance and in 2020 for his performance in Tom Stoppard's play Leopoldstadt.

== Early life ==
Scarborough was born and grew up in Melton Mowbray, Leicestershire. He attended Brooksby Melton College and trained at the Bristol Old Vic Theatre School, winning the Chesterton Award for Best Actor for school graduates.

== Career ==
Scarborough made his big-screen debut in 1994 in The Madness of King George. His other movie appearances have included Sweet Revenge, Gosford Park, Vera Drake, Notes on a Scandal, The History Boys, Elizabeth: The Golden Age, The King's Speech, and Les Misérables.

One of Scarborough's early television roles was J.G. Quiggin in the 1997 adaptation of A Dance to the Music of Time. He was also seen in the BBC series Let Them Eat Cake with Dawn French and Jennifer Saunders. He played "Bouffant", the gay couturier/servant/confidante to Saunder's character, the "Comtesse de Vache". His other appearances on television have included productions such as Cranford, the television film Into the Storm, Psychoville and as Charlie in the BBC comedy series Miranda. He has appeared in three episodes of Midsomer Murders, playing separate characters in series 5, series 10, and series 18. He is also the voice of Abney in the BBC Children's Television programme Abney & Teal. He voiced Benjamin Bunny in The World of Peter Rabbit and Friends.

In 2007, he played the character Harry Hepple in an episode of BBC New Tricks series 4.4 Nine Lives.

Scarborough appeared with Julia Davis in the BBC sitcom Gavin & Stacey as warring married couple Pete and Dawn Sutcliffe, who are friends and neighbours of Gavin Shipman's (Mathew Horne) parents in Essex. He was the butler Mr. Pritchard in the BBC series Upstairs, Downstairs.

In 2012 he appeared in the ITV series Mrs Biggs with fellow Gavin & Stacey star Sheridan Smith, playing the eponymous character's father Bernard (the real-life father of Charmian Brent, ex-wife of Ronnie Biggs). He played an alien known as Kahler-Jex in an episode of Doctor Who entitled "A Town Called Mercy", which aired on 15 September 2012.

On stage, Scarborough has made frequent appearances at the Donmar, the Almeida, and in the West End and he has appeared in twenty productions for the Royal National Theatre. In 2011, he played Inspector Wormold in Betty Blue Eyes and on 19 June 2011, he took part in The Barn Theatre presents... with Elliot Brown at the Barn Theatre, Welwyn Garden City In 2012 he appeared in Hedda Gabler at the Old Vic, again with Sheridan Smith. In 2013, he played a role in Darkside, Tom Stoppard's radio drama based on Pink Floyd's album The Dark Side of the Moon. In 2014 he appeared in the ITV sitcom Edge of Heaven as Bald Gary.

In 2015, he appeared as Clive Trueman in the BBC TV series Father Brown episode 3.15 "The Owl of Minerva". Scarborough also appeared in the Starz sitcom Blunt Talk as Harry, valet to Walter Blunt, a role which he reprised in the second season a year later.

In 2016, he appeared as Colin in the Channel 4 sitcom Crashing and as Tony Pitt in the ITV series Midsomer Murders episode 18.4 "A Dying Art".

In 2017, he appeared in the film adaptation of Ian McEwan's On Chesil Beach as Lionel Mayhew, as well as alongside David Tennant in Don Juan in Soho as his Chauffeur, for its run in the West End at Wyndham's Theatre.

From 2 to 24 November 2018, he portrayed Dr Willis in the Nottingham Playhouse production of the Alan Bennett play The Madness of George III, with Mark Gatiss as the king, which follows his role as Fortnum in the 1994 film version of the play. The same year, he was Hal Gallsworthy in the film Christopher Robin. In 2019, Scarborough was Villanelle's handler "Raymond" in the 2nd season of the TV show Killing Eve.

Since 2022, Scarborough has played the lead role of Detective Inspector Max Arnold in The Chelsea Detective.

== Personal life ==
Scarborough lives in Berkhamsted, Hertfordshire. He and his wife, Rose, have two children.

== Filmography ==
=== Film ===
Year	Title	Role	Notes
1994	The Madness of King George	Fortnum	
1995	In the Bleak Midwinter	Young Actor	
1998	The Revengers' Comedies	Percy Cutting	
1998	Love Is the Devil: Study for a Portrait of Francis Bacon	Daniel Farson	
1998	St. Ives	Le Bon	
2000	Last Resort	Council Official	
2001	Gosford Park	Barnes	
2002	Dirty Pretty Things	The Doctor	
2003	To Kill a King	Sergeant Joyce	
2003	Bright Young Things	Customs Officer	
2004	Vera Drake	Frank	
2006	The History Boys	Wilkes	
2006	Notes on a Scandal	Martin	
2007	Elizabeth: The Golden Age	Calley	
2010	The Kings Speech	BBC Radio Announcer	
2012	Les Misérables	Toothman	
2013	Delicious	Victor	
2014	A Little Chaos	Daniel Le Vielle	
2017	On Chesil Beach	Lionel Mayhew	
2018	Patrick	Mr. Peters	
2018	Christopher Robin	Hal Gallsworthy	
2019	The Last Vermeer	Dirk Hannema	
2019	1917	Major Hepburn	
2020	Artemis Fowl	The Goblin Chief	

=== Television ===
Year	Title	Role	Notes
1991–2008	The Bill	Tim Lock/Harvey/Tommy	3 episodes
1993–1995	The World of Peter Rabbit and Friends	Mr. Benjamin Bunny (voice)	2 episodes
1995	The Governor	Walter Brinkley	6 Episodes
1995	An Independent Man	Robin Swallow	Episode: And So to Bed
1995	Coogan's Run	Councillor Len Crabbe	2 episodes
1996	The Willows in Winter	Nephew Mole (voice)	Television Movie
1997	Cows	Vicar	Television Movie
1997	A Dance to the Music of Time	JG Quiggin	3 episodes
1999	Let Them Eat Cake	Bouffant	6 episodes
1999	The Passion	Martin	Television series
2000	Heartbeat	Martin Padmore	Episode: Smile for the Camera
2002	TLC	The Phlebotomist	Episode: Angry Nurse
2002–2016	Midsomer Murders	Peter Fogden/Eddie Carfax/Tony Pitt	Episode: Ring Out Your Dead, Episode: Picture of Innocence, Episode: A Dying Art
2003	Promoted to Glory	Arnold	Television Movie
2006	Saxondale	Chairman	Episode: Episode 1.2
2007	The Trial of Tony Blair	Simon	Television Movie
2007	New Tricks	Harry Hepple	Episode: Nine Lives
2007	Maxwell	Bob Cole	Television Movie
2007	The History of Mr Polly	Rusper	Television Movie
2007	The Commander: The Fraudster	Clive Seway	Television Movie
2007–2010, 2019, 2024	Gavin & Stacey	Pete Sutcliffe	Supporting role, 8 episodes
2008	10 Days to War	Steve	Episode: Blowblack
2008	Poppy Shakespeare	Middle Class Michael	Television Movie
2008	Caillou	Mr. Hinkle	Episode: Star Light, Star Bright
2009	Minder	Harvey Stevensen	Episode: Thank Your Lucky Stars
2009	Kingdom	Jeff	Episode: Episode #3.4
2009	Into the Film	Sawyers	Television Movie
2009	Psychoville	Mr. Jolly/Surgeon	6 episodes
2010–2012	Upstairs Downstairs	Mr. Warwick Pritchard	9 episodes
2011	National Theatre Live: The Habit of Art	Donald / Humphrey Carpenter	Theatre broadcast
2011	The Adventures of Abney & Teal	Narrator / Abney (voice)	Television Series
2012	Watson & Oliver	Performer	4 Episodes
2012	Doctor Who	Kahler-Jex	2 episodes
2012	Mrs. Biggs	Bernard Powell	4 episodes
2012	Restless	Morris Devereux	2 episodes
2013	The Paradise	Fenton	4 episodes
2013–2014	Plebs	Claudius	6 episodes
2013–2015	Up the Women	Frank	7 episodes
2014	Death in Paradise	Leo Pascal	Episode: An Artistic Murderer
2014	Edge of Heaven	Bald Gary	6 episodes
2014	The Great War: The People's Story	Winston Churchill	Documentary Series
2014	National Theatre Live: King Lear	The Fool	Theatre broadcast
2014	The Incredible Adventures of Professor Branestawn	The Vicar	Television Movie
2015	Professor Branestawn Returns	The Vicar	Television Movie
2015	Miranda	Charlie	5 episodes
2015	Father Brown	Clive Trueman	Episode: The Owl of Minerva
2015	Call the Midwife	Barrington Swann	Christmas Special
2015–2016	Blunt Talk	Harry Chandler	20 episodes
2016	Crashing	Colin	6 episodes
2016	Stella	Horst	Christmas Special
2016	Maigret in Montmartre	Dr. Bloch	Television Movie
2017	Urban Myths	Chief Inspector Danders	Episode: Agatha Christie
2017	Little Women	Mr. Davis	Episode: #1.2
2018	The Darkwater Bride	Unknown	Video
2018	Urban Myths	Inspector Danders	Episode: "Agatha Christie"
2018	A Very English Scandal	George Carman, Q.C	Episode: "Episode #1.3"
2018	National Theatre Live: The Madness of George III	Dr. Willis	Theatre broadcast
2019	Killing Eve	Raymond	3 episodes
2019	The Accident	Philip Walters	4 episodes
2019–2022	Sanditon	Dr. Fuchs	7 episodes
2020	The Windsors	Ian Drabble	Episode: "Episode #3.4"
2021	Murder, They Hope	Jacob	Episode: "The Bunny Trap"
2021–2022	Bloods	Gary	16 episodes
2022–present	The Chelsea Detective	DI Max Arnold	8 episodes
2024	Inside No. 9	Larry	Episode: "Mulberry Close"
