= Gavin & Stacey =

British television sitcom (2007–2024)

- Genre: Sitcom
- Created by: James Corden; Ruth Jones
- Written by: James Corden; Ruth Jones
- Directed by: Christine Gernon
- Starring: Mathew Horne; Joanna Page; James Corden; Ruth Jones; Rob Brydon; Alison Steadman; Larry Lamb; Melanie Walters
- Theme music composer: Stephen Fretwell
- Opening theme: "Run" by Stephen Fretwell
- Country of origin: United Kingdom
- Original language: English
- No. of series: 3
- No. of episodes: 22 (list of episodes)

Production
- Executive producers: Henry Normal; Lindsay Hughes; Ruth Jones; James Corden; David Peet; Leo Pearlman; Ben Winston
- Producer: Ted Dowd
- Camera setup: Single-camera
- Running time: 28–94 minutes
- Production companies: Baby Cow Productions; Fulwell 73 (Christmas special); Tidy Productions (Christmas special)

Original release
- Network: BBC Three (2007–2010); BBC One (2008–2024)
- Release: 13 May 2007 – 25 December 2024

Gavin & Stacey is a British sitcom created, written by and starring James Corden and Ruth Jones about two families: one from Billericay in Essex, and the other from Barry in the Vale of Glamorgan. Mathew Horne and Joanna Page play the eponymous characters Gavin and Stacey, while Corden and Jones star as their respective friends Smithy and Nessa. Alison Steadman and Larry Lamb co-star as Gavin's parents Pam and Mick, Melanie Walters plays Stacey's mother Gwen, and Rob Brydon plays Stacey's uncle Bryn.

Baby Cow Productions produced the sitcom for BBC Cymru Wales. The first series, consisting of six episodes, premiered on BBC Three in May 2007 to positive reviews and strong ratings. It returned for a second series of seven episodes in March 2008, before being transferred to BBC One for a Christmas Eve special, due to the show's growing mainstream popularity. The third and final series aired from 26 November 2009 to 1 January 2010, forming a significant part of the prime-time BBC Christmas programming for 2009.

Gavin & Stacey was directed by Christine Gernon, who had previously directed other BBC sitcoms such as One Foot in the Grave. Acclaimed as both a hit and a breakthrough show for the BBC, it was the most nominated show in the 2007 British Comedy Awards. It won several awards, including the British Academy Television Awards (BAFTA) Audience Award, and the British Comedy Awards Best TV Comedy Award, both in 2008. In 2019, Gavin & Stacey was named the 17th-greatest British sitcom in a poll by Radio Times.

Corden and Jones wrote another Christmas special, which aired on 25 December 2019. With 18.49 million total viewers (11.6 million overnight), the broadcast in the United Kingdom was the most-viewed non-sporting event in a decade and the most-watched comedy in 17 years. The final episode of Gavin & Stacey aired on 25 December 2024, 17 years after the show was first broadcast. The finale was the most-watched scripted show in over two decades.

== Synopsis ==
The story revolves around Gavin, from Billericay in Essex, England, and Stacey, from Barry, Vale of Glamorgan, in South Wales. Gavin lives with his parents, Pam and Mick, and spends most of his time with his best friend, Smithy. Stacey lives with her widowed mother, Gwen, and is frequently visited by her uncle, Bryn, who lives across the road, and by her best friend Nessa. The show follows the key moments in their relationship: their first meeting, meeting each other's families, getting engaged, marrying, looking for a flat, briefly splitting up, looking for new jobs and trying for children.

The characters of Gavin and Stacey provide the emotional core of the story, focusing on the situations that arise when their relationship brings their two different families together. As a result, episodes often focus on the key events in life that bring wider families and close friends together such as weddings, christenings, birthday parties and Christmases. However, the show also presents the families interacting in deliberately non-dramatic situations, such as a visit to the beach and nights out. In these scenes, the subtle dialogue between the characters often contains underlying jokes or comedic value.

The series also follows the contrasting relationship between Smithy and Nessa. Despite their dislike for each other, they have several one-night stands, leading to Nessa becoming pregnant and having their baby. Whilst Gavin and Stacey are the clear main characters, towards the end of the show's run, the dramatic emphasis switches slightly from them, as they resolve their distance issues, to Smithy and Nessa, as Nessa becomes engaged to another man.

Other storylines in the three series include Pam's fake vegetarianism, Bryn and his nephew Jason's struggle to keep the events of their fishing trip a secret, and the rocky marriage of Pam and Mick's friends Pete and Dawn.

== Cast ==
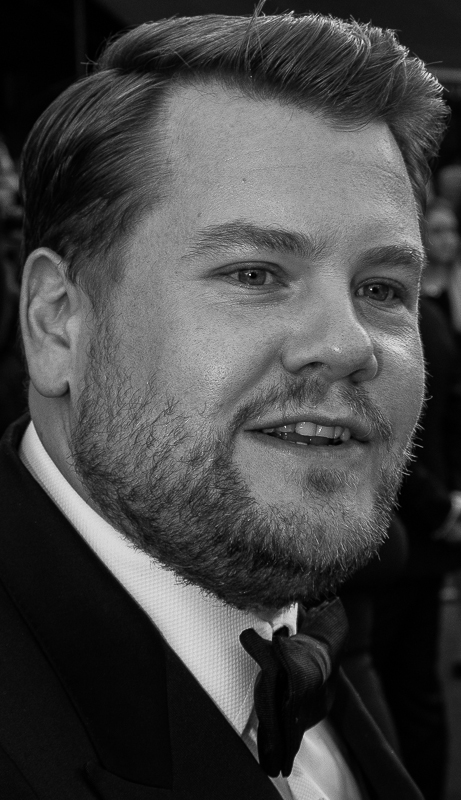
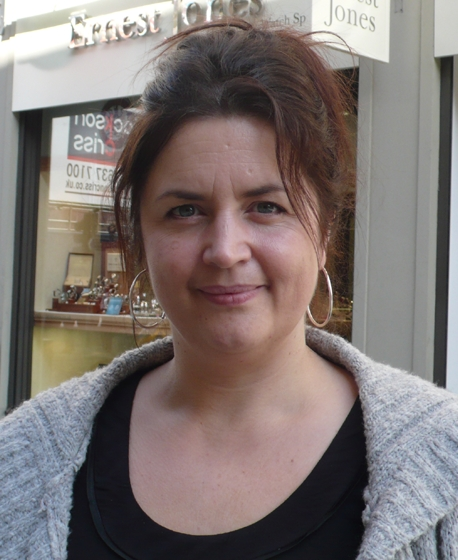
James Corden and Ruth Jones, co-writers and stars

The surnames of well-known English serial killers were used for most of the main characters – Harold Shipman, Fred West and Peter Sutcliffe. Ruth Jones commented in 2009: "I suppose we were hoping that people wouldn't realise and then when it does come to light, it's even more delicious..."

=== Main ===
- Joanna Page as Stacey Shipman (née West), the charming, lively protagonist from Barry who takes Gavin as her husband.
- Mathew Horne as Gavin Shipman, the enthusiastic level-headed protagonist and Stacey's husband from Billericay in Essex
- James Corden as Neil "Smithy" Smith, Gavin's oldest and closest friend, who lives in Billericay. He has a complicated relationship with Nessa.
- Ruth Jones as Vanessa Shanessa "Nessa" Jenkins, Stacey's oldest and closest friend, who lives in Barry. Nessa has several celebrity connections, such as MP John Prescott and Noel Sullivan and later begins a relationship with Dave "Coaches".
- Larry Lamb as Michael "Mick" Shipman, Gavin's down-to-earth father.
- Alison Steadman as Pamela Andrea "Pam" Shipman (née Gryglaszewska), Gavin's house-proud and over-protective mother.
- Rob Brydon as Brynfor "Bryn" West, known as "Uncle Bryn"; Stacey's protective, naïve and eccentric uncle, and Gwen's brother-in-law. Bryn's brother and Stacey's father, Trevor, died prior to the time depicted in the series, and Bryn helped the family cope. He has a difficult relationship with his nephew, Jason, due to a seemingly disturbing incident on their fishing trip. Much of his behaviour throughout the series indicates he is a closeted gay man, but the character's sexuality has only been explicitly mentioned outside of the show.
- Melanie Walters as Gwen West, Stacey's caring, kind, widowed mother.

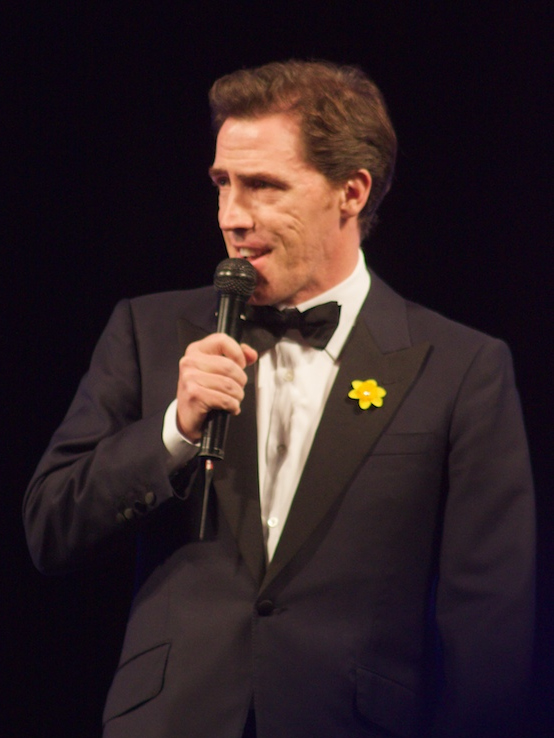
Rob Brydon plays Bryn

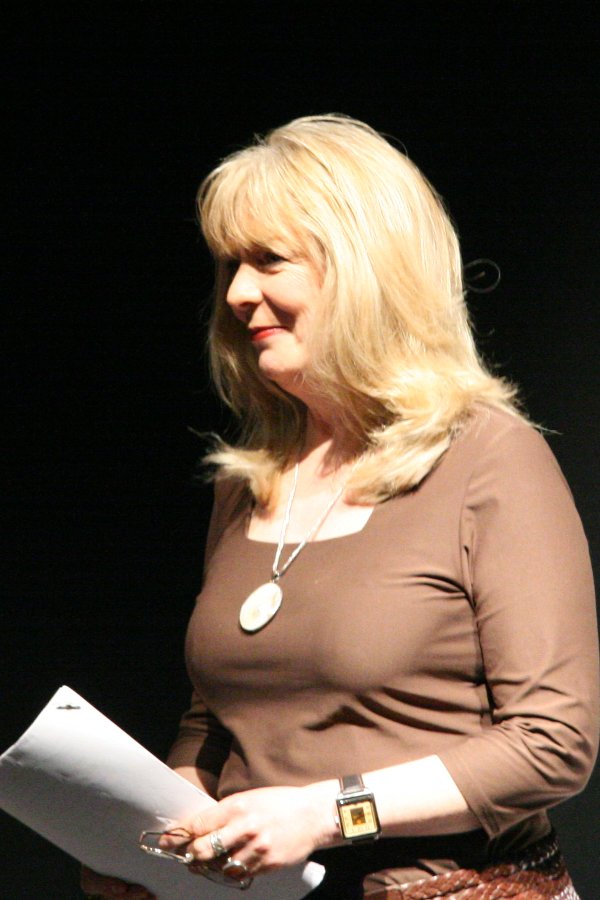
Alison Steadman plays Pam

=== Supporting ===
- David Lloyd Gooch, known as "Dave Coaches" (Steffan Rhodri, series 1–3, 2024 special) – Barry's local coach driver, later Nessa's fiancé. He appears in the first episode when Stacey travels to London to meet Gavin. He also announces his relationship with Gwen in the finale aired on Christmas Day 2024.
- Dawn Sutcliffe (Julia Davis) – a close friend of Pam and Mick, who frequently has public arguments with husband Pete.
- Peter "Pete" Sutcliffe (Adrian Scarborough) – a close friend of Pam and Mick, husband to Dawn, with whom he frequently has public arguments.
- Doris O'Neill (Margaret John, series 1–3) – Gwen's next-door-neighbour and close friend. The 2019 Christmas special refers to Doris as having died aged 84 and left her house to Gavin and Stacey. (Note: Margaret John died in 2011) Nessa is contesting the legacy through the courts.
- Jason West (Robert Wilfort) – Stacey's gay older brother, who lives in Spain.
- Dominic "Dirtbox" (Andrew Knott, series 1–3, 2024 special) – a friend of Gavin and Smithy.
- Karl "Budgie" Barratt (Russell Tovey, series 1–3, 2024 special) – a friend of Gavin and Smithy.
- Chinese Alan (Dominic Gaskell, series 1–3, 2024 special) – a friend of Gavin and Smithy, he enters a room with his infamous catchphrase "Did someone order a Chinese?"
- Craig "Fingers" (Samuel Anderson, series 1, 3, 2024 special) – a friend of Gavin and Smithy, who has an on/off relationship with Stacey's friend Louise, after they meet at the wedding and have sex in a back room.
- Jesus (Daniel Curtis, series 1) – a friend of Gavin and Smithy, whom Smithy insults on Gavin's stag night, claiming he had to get his T-shirt made at the last minute.
- Gary Finch (Jason Gregg, series 1–3, 2024 special) and Simon (Daniel Jeffrey, series 1–2, 2024 special) – friends of Gavin and Smithy, who are never just Gary or Simon, though in series 3 an undisclosed event means Gary comes up to Barry alone.
- Louise Evans (Ffion Williams, series 1, 3) – a friend of Stacey and Nessa, who has an on/off relationship with Gavin and Smithy's friend Fingers, after they meet at the wedding and have sex in a back room.
- Dick Powell (Gwynfor Roberts, series 1, 3) – the only fully Welsh-speaking inhabitant of Barry (aside from the Welsh nationalists in the caravan park), he sells meat on the black market and rarely appears in person.
- Ruth "Rudi" Smith (Sheridan Smith, series 2–3, 2024 special) – Smithy's immature, but loving, younger sister who also likes to be called "Smithy". She works at a KFC in Billericay.
- Dean “Deano” (Mathew Baynton, series 2–3) – a friend of Gavin and Smithy, who works with Smithy as a builder and appears to be very dim-witted.
- Catherina "Cath" Smith (Pam Ferris, series 3, 2024 special) – Smithy and Rudi's single mother, who suffers from "a mild form of narcolepsy" (which Pam thinks is a cover for a drinking problem).
- Neil Jenkins (Huw Dafydd, series 3) – Nessa's father and bit part actor (he was an extra in Lark Rise to Candleford), rarely seen in Barry although it is never disclosed why he does not "show his face in Barry".
- Owain Hughes (Steve Meo, series 3) – Website Manager in Gavin's new job in Cardiff. He has the obscure catchphrase: "Owain Hughes, and before you ask, no I don't."
- Angie (Beth Granville, series 3) – a friend of Stacey and Nessa.
- Swede (John Grisley, series 3) – a friend of Gavin and Smithy.
- Neil "the Baby" Smith (Scarlett Humphreys; uncredited series 2, Lewis Merchant and Cari Kiernan; 2008 special, Ewan Kennedy; series 3, Oscar Hartland; series 3–2024 special, Rocco Romanello) – Smithy and Nessa's son. He is named after Nessa's father and Smithy (who are both called Neil), Nessa's friend from Hear'Say (Noel Sullivan), and Smithy's grandfather Edmond. In the episode of the christening, Gavin jokes that Neil is named after Noel Edmonds, which annoys Smithy.
- Sonia (Laura Aikman, 2019 and 2024 specials) – Smithy's new girlfriend and subsequent fiancée.
- Harri Shipman (Gabriel Mitell, 2019 and 2024 specials) – Gavin and Stacey's eldest child, who was born shortly after the third series in 2010.
- Caitlin Shipman (Martha-Eve Tregonning, 2019 and 2024 specials) – Gavin and Stacey's elder daughter.
- Megan Shipman (Maddison Belle Platt, 2019 and 2024 specials) – Gavin and Stacey's younger daughter.

=== Guests ===
Matt Lucas makes a guest appearance in the fourth episode of the first series; his name helped the series to secure the filming locations in Barry. Noel Sullivan and John Prescott made cameo appearances in the final episode of series 3.

== Episodes ==
Series	Episodes	Originally released		Average UK viewers (millions)
Series	Episodes	First released	Last released	Average UK viewers (millions)
1	6	13 May 2007	10 June 2007	0.96
2	7	16 March 2008	20 April 2008	1.62
Special		24 December 2008		7.19
3	6	26 November 2009	1 January 2010	7.65
Special		25 December 2019		18.49
Special		25 December 2024		20.90

=== Series 1 (2007) ===
The initial series begins with the lives of the title characters, Gavin Shipman (Mathew Horne) and Stacey West (Joanna Page). Gavin is 28 and lives at home in Billericay, Essex, with his parents, Mick (Larry Lamb) and Pam (Alison Steadman). Stacey is 26, and she also lives at home in Barry Island, Wales, with her widowed mother, Gwen (Melanie Walters), with her uncle, Bryn (Rob Brydon) living over the road. The two, along with their respective best friends Neil "Smithy" Smith (James Corden) and Nessa Jenkins (Ruth Jones), meet for the first time in Leicester Square in London. The night ends with Gavin and Stacey returning to a hotel room and sleeping together, as do Smithy and Nessa. Gavin and Stacey become infatuated with each other, but Smithy and Nessa are happy to forget their drunken one-night stand and make little contact with one another afterwards. In the rest of the series, Gavin and Stacey continue their long-distance relationship before becoming engaged and getting married on 6 April 2007. The series ends with Nessa going to inform Smithy that she is pregnant with his child but she changes her mind at the last minute.

=== Series 2 (2008) ===
The second series begins with the newlyweds arriving back from their honeymoon in Greece. The in-laws meet again at the Shipmans' house in Essex, where Nessa has some shocking revelations – especially for Smithy, who is the last to learn that she is pregnant with his baby, and although he makes it clear that he thoroughly dislikes the woman, he is generally civil and supportive towards her about their child. Meanwhile, Gavin and Stacey, living at Pam and Mick's house, run into trouble when Stacey struggles to find a job and becomes homesick for Barry Island and her family. The couple try to overcome their problem by looking for an apartment or house in Essex, but Stacey is still dissatisfied and is considering moving back to South Wales to be with her family. In the final episode of the series, Stacey removes her wedding ring, much to the upset of Gavin, but this is interrupted by the news of Nessa unexpectedly going into labour a month early. Pam, Mick and Stacey hurry across to Wales, whilst Gavin rushes to find Smithy with Smithy's sister, Rudi (Sheridan Smith), eventually finding him in the pub watching football. They arrive to find that Nessa has given birth to a boy, Neil, named after Nessa's father and Smithy since they share a first name. Gavin and Stacey decide to put their differences aside and are together once again.

=== Christmas special (2008) ===
An extended Christmas special involves Stacey's family, along with Nessa and her partner, Dave Coaches (Steffan Rhodri), spending Christmas with Gavin's parents. Gavin reveals that he has found a job in Cardiff, which at first causes upset for Pam and Smithy, but they both learn to accept it. Gavin later admits to Smithy that he is moving to Barry Island with Stacey in order to save his marriage. Smithy also gets upset when he feels that Dave, who lives with the baby, Neil, is replacing him as a father. Smithy is furthermore unhappy after Dave proposes to Nessa, with the ring enclosed in a cigarette packet, and she accepts.

=== Series 3 (2009–2010) ===
Gavin begins his new job in Wales and his parents and Smithy travel to Wales for Neil's christening. In the next episode Gavin, Stacey, Nessa and her child Neil, spend the weekend at Pam and Mick's, and after a drunken night, it is believed that Nessa and Smithy may have once again had sex after waking up in bed together the next morning. Gavin and Stacey begin trying for a baby and Stacey is upset and disappointed when she learns that they may not be able to have children. Gavin becomes depressed and preoccupied with this issue, and in an attempt to cheer him up, Pam, Mick and Smithy arrange a surprise trip to Barry beach on a sunny bank holiday. Nessa and Dave also run into trouble after Dave learns about her alleged sexual intercourse with Smithy, but the two decide to go ahead with the wedding. In the final episode, Stacey discovers she is pregnant after all, and the couple are overjoyed. Smithy shows up at Nessa and Dave's wedding ceremony with Neil, pleading for her not to marry him, whilst accusing her of not loving Dave. Dave, much to everyone's surprise, agrees with Smithy that Nessa does not love him, and the ceremony is called off. The series ends showing the four (Gavin, Stacey, Nessa and Smithy) six months later on Barry beachfront, with a visibly pregnant Stacey.

=== Christmas special (2019) ===
Eleven years have passed since Gavin and Stacey went to Billericay to spend Christmas with the older Shipmans and the Wests. This year, since everyone is in Wales for the festivities, Bryn is cooking dinner for over 13 people. Pam would secretly prefer to spend Christmas in Essex, as she finds Gwen's house a bit lacking. The deal has always been that they alternate every year, and this time it's the turn of the Wests to host Christmas. Gavin and Stacey are now parents of three children: Harri, Caitlin and Megan; but Stacey is worried that their relationship has lost the excitement of the early days. Smithy, too, continues to commit to his fatherly role, making the journey to Barry Island on at least alternate weekends to see a now 11-year-old Neil.

At the end, Nessa confesses to Smithy that she is in love with him, getting down on one knee to propose, ending the programme on a cliffhanger.

The episode is dedicated to the memory of Margaret John, who played Doris, who died in February 2011.

=== The Finale (2024) ===
This episode follows on five years from the events which occurred in the 2019 special. Smithy is preparing for his wedding. It emerges he did not respond to Nessa's proposal and proceeded to get engaged to Sonia. The episode centres on the respective stag and hen parties, both of which fall flat. The episode ends with Smithy leaving Sonia at the altar, after which, Smithy and Nessa get married.

=== Documentaries ===
Behind-the-scenes documentaries were aired after the 2019 and 2024 Christmas specials, titled 12 Days of Christmas and Gavin & Stacey: A Fond Farewell, respectively.

== Production ==
The idea for the show occurred to actor James Corden during a wedding reception, and he then developed the idea with co-writer Ruth Jones, whom he had met during the filming of ITV drama Fat Friends. Corden claims to have been inspired by the story of his own real life best friend Gavin, who met his wife over the phone at work, and arranged to meet. They presented it to the BBC as a one-off play entitled It's My Day, but the BBC instead asked for a full series.

The roles of Gavin and Stacey were cast through an auditioning process, but were almost immediately given to Mathew Horne and Joanna Page on the strength of their chemistry together. The roles of Nessa and Smithy were written by Corden and Jones for themselves. Some roles were written with certain actors in mind: Uncle Bryn was written specifically for Rob Brydon, who had attended school with Jones; whilst Pam was written specifically for Alison Steadman, who had also worked on Fat Friends. Jones had worked with Julia Davis in her sitcom Nighty Night, and the role of Dawn was written with her in mind. Additionally, Corden had appeared with Adrian Scarborough in the Alan Bennett-penned play and film, The History Boys, which led to him being cast in the role of Pete. An audition process was used to cast the roles of Mick and Gwen, whilst the roles of Gavin's friends were given to Corden's co-stars in The History Boys.

The three series were shot largely in Cardiff (which acted as parts of Billericay) and in Barry and the surrounding area, including Dinas Powys, Sully and Penarth. The show's popularity has been credited with boosting the tourist trade to Barry and its popular seafront of Barry Island, through visitors wishing to visit the various filming locations. Gavin's house (address "23 Limetree Avenue") was set in Billericay but was actually filmed on location in Laburnum Way, Dinas Powys in Wales. The opening episode features location shooting in Leicester Square in London, which was filmed in 2006.

After the debut of the show on BBC Three, a second series was soon commissioned. Speaking about the second series, Corden said, "It's the show that we wanted to make. If people like it, they like it; if they don't, they don't. That's a nice feeling, that's quite freeing... There's more of a journey and more of a story. We hope the viewers will feel like they've been taken on a little trip by it." Jones said, "Series one had a very specific storyline to it, boy meets girl and it ends in a wedding. We don't have the same type of storyline in the second series. It's now girl lives with boy's parents in Essex and the joys that might entail."

There was initial uncertainty over whether a third series would be produced. In an April 2008 interview, Jones said, "We never intended to write a second series, let alone a third. We don't want it to become predictable. We will see how the Christmas special goes and take it from there." Corden added: "We will write one if we can make it better. We have to be true to ourselves." Corden and Jones completed the final draft of the Christmas Special by September 2008, although they ruled out writing the third series at the time due to pressures of other work, and repeating the wish not to produce a sub-standard script.

Corden and Jones eventually announced there would be a third series produced, on 21 December 2008 just before the 2008 Christmas special aired, as Jones performed her final BBC Radio Wales Sunday Brunch radio show to a live audience on Barry Island.

In May 2019, a second Christmas special was announced by Corden which aired on Christmas Day 2019.

In February 2024, a third Christmas special was rumoured for Christmas 2024; however, co-creator Jones dismissed the claim, stating that it was "sadly a rumour". However, shortly afterwards Jones said that there were no plans "set in stone", causing confusion as to whether or not there was another special planned.

On 3 May 2024, Corden announced via his social media channels that he and Jones had completed writing the final episode of the show, to air on Christmas Day 2024 on BBC One. Jones later criticised the fact that news of the show had been leaked, saying, "James and I wanted to give everybody a nice surprise and I think it was really mean that they leaked it." Filming of the final episode began on 2 September 2024 and wrapped on 8 October. Aikman's involvement in the special was concealed from the public prior to broadcast.

== Awards ==
The show was nominated for, and won, several awards throughout its run, with two notable wins being the British Academy Television Awards Audience Award, and the British Comedy Awards Best TV Comedy Award, both in 2008.

In the 2007 British Comedy Awards, the show won Best New British TV Comedy, losing in the Best New TV Comedy category to Peep Show. James Corden and Ruth Jones won Best Male and Female Comedy Newcomer respectively, with fellow cast members Mathew Horne and Joanna Page having also been nominated in the same categories. The show was also named Best New British TV Sitcom in the 2007 The Comedy.co.uk Awards.

In April 2008 the show won two awards in the BAFTAs, the Audience Award, and Best Comedy Performance for James Corden. In December 2008 the show won Best TV Comedy in the 2008 British Comedy Awards. In the 2009 BAFTAs Rob Brydon was nominated for Best Comedy Performance as Bryn.

In the National Television Awards in January 2010, Gavin and Stacey won the award for Best Comedy.

In January 2020, the series won the "Impact Award" at the 25th National Television Awards. It also won the 2020 British Academy Television Award for Virgin TV's Must-See Moment ("Nessa proposes to Smithy").

=== Critical reaction ===
Immediately after the end of series 2, in April 2008 The Guardian described the show as "BBC Three's biggest breakout comedy hit since Little Britain", while Deborah Orr wrote that the show was "amiable, unpretentious, well-scripted, nicely acted and archly amusing. It's a good series, taking its place in a well-worn comedic progression, stretching back to The Liver Birds."

Just before the third series aired, The Independent described how the show had developed from a respectable début on BBC Three to an award-winning show with mainstream popularity after the BBC One Christmas special, although it noted a perception from some that the show shouldn't "get above itself". With its mainstream acceptance, however, it was of the opinion that the show had all the ingredients to become an "audience-pleasing family sitcom in the tradition of Only Fools and Horses and The Royle Family – churning out series after series and Christmas special after Christmas special", although by then, the writers had already ruled out future full series. In 2019, Gavin & Stacey was named the 17th-greatest British sitcom of all time in a poll by Radio Times.

== Other appearances ==
Characters from the show have appeared outside the series' episodes in aid of various charitable causes.

=== Barry Islands in the Stream ===
In the fifth episode of the second series (6 April 2008), for Gwen's birthday barn dance, Bryn and Nessa perform a duet of "Islands in the Stream". On 21 February 2009, this was adapted into "Barry Islands In The Stream", a musical mini-sketch aired for Comic Relief. In a storyline that sees Bryn and Nessa invited to compete in the World Karaoke Championships in Las Vegas, Nessa bumps into her old friend Tom Jones, who joins them on stage, and the sketch also features Bee Gee Robin Gibb. Also released as a charity single, it debuted in the number one spot on the UK Singles Chart on 15 March 2009.

For Red Nose Day 2009 on 13–14 March, the main telethon event for Comic Relief, a second sketch was aired where James Corden, in character as Smithy, has a chance encounter with the England national football team and proceeds to give them some advice on tactics and teamwork. "Barry Islands In The Stream" was also performed live for the Top of the Pops 2009 Red Nose Day special.

=== Smithy ===
There have been two charity episodes depicted as a "spin-off" of Gavin & Stacey called Smithy, starring James Corden as the title character.

For Sport Relief 2010 on 19 March 2010, Corden appeared again as Smithy in a long sketch about coaching, where he meets England footballers such as David Beckham, John Terry and Rio Ferdinand. Corden had previously recorded a live 9-minute segment during the December 2009 BBC Sports Personality of the Year awards ceremony. It sees Smithy being presented with the Coach of the Year Award for his unsung coaching influence on several British sports stars. As he jokes with the audience, he declares he can't accept the award and goes on to rant at the assembled sporting stars for having 'lost their way' and focusing on celebrity, ending on a rousing appeal to get back to basics, leaving hosts Sue Barker and Gary Lineker in mock tears. As a backstory, sketches are shown of how Smithy coached Tom Daley, Andrew Flintoff, Andy Murray, Jenson Button, David Beckham and the Manchester United team.

On 19 December 2010, Corden appeared as Smithy in the live ceremony for the 2010 BBC Sports Personality of the Year Awards, announcing that Sport Relief had raised over £44 million, expressing his doubts that England manager Fabio Capello would win the coach of the year award, and giving the 15 times Darts World Champion Phil Taylor his backing as a candidate for the main award, praising his dedication to training by going down the pub every night sinking pints.

There was another episode of Smithy for the 2011 Comic Relief appeal guest starring Lenny Henry, Richard Curtis, George Michael, Dermot O'Leary, JLS, Davina McCall, Rupert Grint, Tom Felton, Sebastian Coe, Gordon Brown, Robert Winston, Roger Lloyd-Pack, Rio Ferdinand, Keira Knightley, Richard Madeley, Clare Balding, Tom Daley, Justin Bieber, Paul McCartney and Ringo Starr.

Corden appeared as Smithy again on Michael McIntyre's Christmas Roadshow on BBC One on 25 December 2011. The sketch showed Smithy in a dating-show style spoof with Miranda Hart as her TV alter ego.

He again appeared at Comic Relief, this time in 2013, in the live studio itself. He went on to rant about all the world's issues and his opinions on them.

Corden appeared as the character again for 2016's Sport Relief, where Smithy campaigns to be elected as Sepp Blatter's replacement as the president of FIFA.

=== Nessa ===
Ruth Jones read BBC Radio's Shipping Forecast in the voice of Nessa, to mark the forecast's centenary, on 1 January 2025.

=== Channel 4 Comedy Gala ===
On 30 March 2010, Corden and Jones appeared in character as Smithy and Nessa as part of Channel 4's Comedy Gala, held at the O2 Arena in London in aid of Great Ormond Street Children's Hospital, broadcast on Channel 4 on 5 April 2010. Following on from the events of the final episode, they arrive in London on a day trip from Barry Island, with Neil the baby in tow.

== Home media ==
The decision was made by BBC Worldwide to release the full DVD box set of series three on 7 December 2009, in time for the Christmas rush, despite not all of the series having aired in the UK. There was some criticism, with Liberal Democrat media spokesperson Don Foster saying it devalued the licence fee. Despite this release, subsequent episodes still saw some of the show's highest viewing figures.

=== DVD and Blu ray releases ===
Series	Title	No. of episodes	Release dates		
Series	Title	No. of episodes	Region 1	Region 2	Region 4
1	Series One	6	5 May 2009	29 October 2007	2 April 2009
2	Series Two	7	27 September 2011	10 November 2008	1 April 2010
1–2	Series One & Two	13	—N/a	10 November 2008	—N/a
Special (2008)	Christmas Special	1	—N/a	6 April 2009	29 June 2010
3	Series Three	6 (Note: The 2008 special is included in the Region 1 edition, bringing its episode total to 7.)	27 September 2011	7 December 2009	29 June 2010
1–3 (Note: Includes the 2008 special.)	The Complete Collection	20	27 September 2011	7 December 2009	4 November 2010
Special (2019)	A Special Christmas	1	—N/a	6 January 2020	—N/a
1–3 (Note: Includes the 2008 and 2019 specials.)	The Definitive Collection	21	—N/a	26 October 2020	—N/a
Special (2024)	The Finale	1	—N/a	3 February 2025	—N/a
1–3 (Note: Includes the 2008, 2019 and 2024 specials.)	The Complete Collection	22	—N/a	3 February 2025	—N/a

== International broadcasts ==
Gavin & Stacey has aired on BBC Entertainment, BritBox, BBC America and BBC Canada channels. Also screened in Australia (Seven Network, 7TWO, ABC2 and UK-TV), Belgium/Flanders (Acht), Israel (HOT V.O.D and Yes Stars Comedy), Ireland (RTÉ Two), in The Netherlands (RTL 8), Iceland (Stöð 2), New Zealand (TV ONE), Portugal (RTP2), Sweden (SVT) and Spain/Catalonia (3XL).

== Adaptations ==
Various adaptations have been attempted but have not matched the success of the original.

=== NBC (2008) ===
In March 2008, it was reported the American network NBC had bought the rights to produce an American remake from Baby Cow Productions. Initial ideas according to Corden were to have Gavin coming from New Jersey and Stacey from South Carolina, meeting up in New York City. In December 2008 however, Jones stated "There was a script written for NBC. They optioned it, but then that went away. I read the script and it wasn't great to be honest with you. But now ABC are looking into writing a pilot and hopefully that will work out". At the time, both Corden and Jones were reportedly acting as executive producers of the ABC version, while interviewing other people for the job of writing the adaptation.

=== ABC pilot (2009–10) ===
In September 2009 it was reported that ABC had ordered a pilot for an American remake, to be written by Stacy Traub and Hayes Jackson, and produced by BBC Worldwide. The series was not picked up.

=== Fox (2013–14, unaired), Crackle (2018): Us & Them ===
On 8 May 2013, Fox announced that an American remake, Us & Them, would be broadcast in the network's 2013–14 schedule. Thirteen episodes were ordered. On 11 October 2013, it was revealed that only six episodes would air after production went into early hiatus, before being halted altogether. In June 2014, Fox announced that the six episodes would not air on the network.

== See also ==
- British sitcom
