= Joanna Page =

Welsh actress and presenter (born 1977)

- Born: Joanna Louise Page; 23 March 1977 (age 49); Treboeth, Swansea, Wales
- Education: Royal Academy of Dramatic Art
- Occupations: Actress; presenter
- Years active: 1999–present
- Known for: Gavin & Stacey; Love Actually; David Copperfield
- Spouse: James Thornton (m. 2003)
- Children: 4

Joanna Louise Page (born 23 March 1977) is a Welsh actress and presenter, best known for portraying the role of Stacey Shipman in the BBC sitcom Gavin & Stacey. She played Dora Spenlow in the 1999 adaptation of David Copperfield, and featured as Just Judy in the 2003 romantic comedy Love Actually.

Page has since ventured into presenting. In 2021, she began co-presenting the BBC One consumer series Shop Well for Less. Between 2023 and 2024, she also appeared on Loose Women as a regular panellist. Since 2026, she has fronted the BBC programme Shift the Thrift. She has also appeared as a contestant on The Masked Dancer (2022), Cooking with the Stars (2023) and I'm a Celebrity...Get Me Out of Here! (2026).

== Early life ==
Page was born in Treboeth, Swansea, Wales. She attended Mynyddbach Comprehensive School, where she was head girl.

Page attended the Royal Academy of Dramatic Art (RADA) in London, where she was constantly told she could not act. On her graduation in 1998, a director's assistant told her that he realised that she was not a poor actress, but that the problem was "that you're Welsh". Page later admitted that the comments led her to walk out of the school "and I have never, ever been back since".

== Career ==
Page spent ten years in stage-based roles, for the Royal National Theatre and Royal Shakespeare Company. This led to appearances in film productions, including From Hell, Mine All Mine, Love Actually and Miss Julie.

Page came to wider public attention after taking a leading role in the BBC comedy Gavin & Stacey, playing the main part of Stacey Shipman. She appeared in the show's three series between 2007 and 2010, before returning for a Christmas special in 2019. In May 2024 it was announced that a final episode of the show, broadcast on Christmas Day 2024, had been written.

Page had a leading role in the 2001 BBC drama production The Cazalets, about a disparate, well-to-do English family during the Second World War. In 2009, Page provided the voice-overs for a series of Kingsmill bread TV and radio advertisements and the Christmas TV advertising campaign for the Carphone Warehouse. In December 2009, she was the cover star of FHM.

In 2010, she hosted Sky 1 show My Pet Shame. In October of the same year, she became the new face of Superdrug.

From May 2011, Page provided the voice of the lead character in the first season of Nick Jr. Channel UK's pre-school animation Poppy Cat. In 2012, Page played Leanne Powell in the BBC One drama series The Syndicate, Helen Pearson in the Sky Living comedy Gates, and Mrs Peterson in Nativity 2: Danger in the Manger. In November 2013, Page starred as Queen Elizabeth I in "The Day of the Doctor", the 50th Anniversary episode of Doctor Who.

In 2021, Page began presenting BBC One's consumer series Shop Well for Less. At the end of 2021 she began co-hosting the show The Pet Show on ITV with Dermot O'Leary. In 2022, she appeared on the second series of The Masked Dancer as Pig. In 2023 she filmed the BBC television feature Men Up, about the first clinical trials for the drug Viagra that took place in Swansea in 1994. She also appeared as a contestant on the ITV series Cooking with the Stars.

Between 2023 and 2024, Page began appearing as a regular panellist on the ITV talk show Loose Women.

In 2026, Page won the twenty-first series of the comedy panel show Taskmaster. She also joined Magic Radio as a cover presenter for Mel Giedroyc. The same year, Page appeared as a contestant on the twenty-sixth series of I'm a Celebrity...Get Me Out of Here!.

== Personal life ==
Page is married to English actor James Thornton. They both appeared in the 1999 TV serial David Copperfield (Page as Dora Spenlow and Thornton as Ham Peggotty). Page and Thornton have four children.

== Filmography ==
=== Film ===
Year	Title	Role
1999	Miss Julie	Servant
1999	David Copperfield	Dora Spenlow
2001	Very Annie Mary	Bethan Bevan
2001	From Hell	Ann Crook
2001	The Lost World	Gladys
2003	Love Actually	Just Judy
2003	Ready When You Are, Mr. McGill	Babs Carter
2012	Nativity 2: Danger in the Manger	Mrs. Peterson
2020	Dolittle	Bethan Stubbins
2020	Dream Horse	Angela Davies

=== Television ===
Year	Title	Role	Notes
2001	The Cazalets	Zoe	
2004	Mine All Mine	Candy Vivaldi	
2004	Making Waves	OM Rosie Bowen	
2005	To the Ends of the Earth	Marion Chumley	TV miniseries
2005	Gideon's Daughter	Diane	
2007–2010, 2019, 2024	Gavin & Stacey	Stacey Shipman	Lead role, 22 episodes
2008	Love Soup	Heather	Series 2, episode 10
2009	Jack Osbourne: Celebrity Adrenaline Junkie	Herself	Series 5, episode 3
2009	Mist: Sheepdog Tales	Fly	Series 3, 6 episodes, Voice only
2010	Would I Lie to You?	Herself	
2010	Agatha Christie's Marple	Hester	"The Blue Geranium"
2010	My Pet Shame	Host	
2011	Bedlam	Maria	
2011	White Van Man	Kat	Series 1, episode 2
2011	Poppy Cat	Poppy Cat	Series 1, Voice only
2012	The Syndicate	Leanne Powell	
2012	Gates	Helen Pearson	
2013	Doctor Who	Queen Elizabeth I	Episode: "The Day of the Doctor"
2013	Breathless	Lily Enderbury	
2013–present	Q Pootle 5	Oopsy	Voice only
2016	Home from Home	Fiona Hackett	Pilot episode only
2017	Spring Break with Granddad	Voice Over	Voice only
2019	Britain's Parking Hell: Ticket Wars	Narrator	Voice only
2019	Midsomer Murders	Holly Ackroyd	Episode: "The Miniature Murders"
2019	Dial M for Middlesbrough	Susan	
2021–present	Shop Well For Less	Presenter	
2021–present	The Pet Show	Co Presenter	
2022	The Masked Dancer	Pig	
2022	Dog Squad	Tinks	Three episodes (voice)
2023	Cooking With The Stars	Herself/contestant	
2023	Men Up	Moira Davies	Television film
2023–2024	Loose Women	Regular panellist	
2025	Joanna Page's Wild Life	Presenter	15 episodes
2025	Wynne & Joanna: All at Sea	Herself	6-part series with Wynne Evans
2026	Taskmaster	Herself/contestant	Series 21, 10 episodes
2026–present	Shift the Thrift	Host	Second series commissioned
2026	I'm a Celebrity...Get Me Out of Here!	Herself/contestant	Series 26

=== Theatre ===
Year	Title	Role
2008	Fat Pig	Jeannie
2009	Cinderella	Cinderella
2010	Dick Whittington	Alice Fritzwarren
2011	Private Lives	Sibyl

== Recognition ==
Page was nominated for 'Best Female Comedy Newcomer' at the 2007 British Comedy Awards.
