= Cassandra at the Wedding =

American rite of passage novel

Cassandra at the Wedding was the last novel published by American writer Dorothy Baker. It follows the relationship between a set of identical twins, Judith and Cassandra Edwards, who are set to reunite after an extended separation from each other. During this absence, Judith has gotten engaged to an East Coast medical student that her sister has yet to meet. Cassandra returns to their childhood home in the Sierra Foothills to attend Judith's wedding at her sister's request, where most of the events of the novel unfold over just a few days.

The novel was originally published in 1962 by Houghton Mifflin in the U.S. and Victor Gollancz in the U.K. It was re-released first in 2004, then again in 2012 after being acquired by the New York Review of Books. Its republishing was allegedly brokered by Edwin Frank, one of the founders of the NYRB. The 2012 edition included an afterword written by Deborah Eisenberg, a highly accoladed short story writer. Her husband, Howard Baker, has stated Dorothy based the novel off of their own daughters, Ellen Baker and Joan Fry, though the two were not twins.

Cassandra, who describes herself as being "constituted" differently, with a repulsion to and fear of men, has been identified by many readers as a lesbian protagonist, though it is never stated so overtly in the book. This was not Baker's first novel to deal with lesbian themes. Her second novel, Trio, features a controversial lesbian relationship between its main characters —an older professor and her younger, impressionable student — and Baker's attempt to adapt it into a play with her husband's assistance was met with protests and censorship. Baker's first and most immediately popular novel, Young Man With A Horn, also featured a female character whose relationships with other women made her the subject of much lesbian speculation.

The book is split into three sections: "Cassandra Speaks," "Judith Speaks," and "Cassandra Speaks" again, with the sisters taking turns being the primary narrator.

== Plot ==
The novel opens with Cassandra, at the close of the semester at UC Berkeley, where she is working on a thesis about the French novel. She wants to be a writer, but resists following the same path as her mother, who was the writer of several well-known screenplays, novels and plays. It's implied that Cassandra has been involved in some lesbian relationships while at Berkeley, and she's dodging calls from at least one woman.

Her sister Judith is a talented musician, who had left the apartment they were sharing in Berkeley for New York nine months prior to the start of the novel, having enrolled in Juilliard. Since Judith's desertion, Cassandra has been having a prolonged nervous breakdown which has led her to seek the care of an analyst, a Dr. Vera Mercer. Dr. Mercer has prescribed her a variety of pills, including uppers, downers, and sleeping pills.

Having driven from Berkeley to home to attend her sister's wedding at Judith's request, Cassandra arrives at the ranch where they grew up, which is described as being located outside of the fictional town of Putnam, about sixty miles from Visalia. Still at home are their grandmother and their father, a retired philosophy professor, who is a reclusive alcoholic. Their grandmother, Mrs. Rowena Abbot, is delighted about the prospect of the wedding and is trying to convince Judith to have a bigger ceremony at a church, which would include many members of the community, though the twins never had many friends except for each other. Mrs. Abbot's daughter was the twin's mother, Jane, who has passed away of cancer three years before the book's start. Also living on the property are a housekeeper, Conchita, and her husband Tómas, though they appear rarely in the book.

When Judith and Cassandra are reunited at their childhood home, they are forced to confront the level of co-dependency between them and how the intertwining of their identities as twins has prevented them from living as individuals. Judith's fiancée, Jack Finch, is out of town, having gone to interview for a job at a University Hospital in Los Angeles. This leaves the twins alone for the night, during which Cassandra tries to talk Judith out of getting married. Disturbed by the upcoming wedding, Cassandra begins drinking heavily and searches the house frantically for her purse containing her pills from Dr. Mercer.

The next day, Judith and Cassandra get into an argument and Judith leaves to go pick up Jack at the Bakersfield airport without saying goodbye. After recounting the events of the previous day to Jack, he and Judith impulsively decide to get married at the courthouse. Returning home anxious to tell the family what they'd done, they discover Cassandra unconscious, having intentionally overdosed on sleeping pills. A frenzied resuscitation attempt is carried out over the course of the night, with the help of Jack, a town doctor, and Dr. Mercer, who charters a private plane from Berkeley and arrives on the ranch to see Cassandra.

The rest of the book follows the reconciliation between the twins, the wedding reception planned for Judith and Jack, and Cassandra's eventual return to Berkeley.

== Critical reception ==
In October 2021, the novel became the subject of episode No. 148 of the Backlisted podcast, which prides itself on "giving new life to old books." In the episode, publisher Alexandra Pringle and editor Simon Thomas discuss the book along with hosts Andy Miller and John Mitchinson.

In 2022, The Strategist published an article titled "Why Is Everyone Suddenly Reading Cassandra at the Wedding? (A forensic investigation.)" The article tracks the process of the novel being recommended to a web of people, originating with Cornelia Channing, an editorial assistant at the New York Times' Sunday Review, writer Sadie Stein, Taylor Ward, a wine and service director, writer Maggie Rose who was working at Disney and tried to get it made into a film, and members of The New Yorker staff including Clare Sestanovich and David Schurman Wallace.

In 2024, The Guardian included it in a list of five of the best books about siblings, alongside James Baldwin's Just Above My Head, Siblings by Briggitte Reimann, Mayhem by Sigrid Rausing, and Home Fire by Kamila Shamsie. In the list, Sophie Ratcliffe describes Baker's novel as a "cult 60s coming-of-age tale" which "unfurls like a bacchanalian comedy of errors."

Cassandra at the Wedding was recommended in 2024 as part of actress Natalie Portman's bookclub.

== Adaptations ==
In 2010, a movie adaptation of the novel was in the works with British director Dominic Murphy attached, and Bruno Heller writing the script. Murphy was later replaced as director by Marc Evans. The film was never released.

Writer Peter Flannery adapted Baker's novel as a radio drama, which was broadcast on BBC Radio 4 and starred Nancy Crane as Dr. Mercer, Hayley Atwell as Cassandra, Cassie Layton as Judith, Walles Hamonde as Jack, Tom Clarke-Hill as the twins' father and Buffy Davis as their grandmother. It was directed by Melanie Harris, executive-produced by Jo Meek, and featured Eloise Whitmore on sound design. The program aired in 2016.

John Early is credited to having brought the book to the attention of the film distribution and production company Neon, which is currently in possession of the rights to adapt the book. After reading the novel, Early proposed the project to playwright Sarah DeLappe, and he and DeLappe pitched the project to the surviving relatives running Dorothy Baker's estate. The estate approved the project with Seaview and Neon as co-producers. Seaview was a primarily Broadway-focused production company that is expanding into film and TV. Neon officially bought the rights to the project in 2022, and so far it is listed as still being in production.
