= Young Man with a Horn =

Young Man with a Horn may refer to:

- Young Man with a Horn (novel), a novel by Dorothy Baker, loosely based on the life of Bix Beiderbecke
- Young Man with a Horn (film), a film adaptation of the novel
- Young Man with a Horn (soundtrack), an album featuring Doris Day and Harry James performing songs from the film's soundtrack
- Young Man With A Horn (Miles Davis album), a 10" jazz album on Blue Note by the Miles Davis Sextet
- "Young Man with a Horn" (CSI episode), a ninth-season episode of CSI: Crime Scene Investigation
