= Marc Evans =

Welsh film director

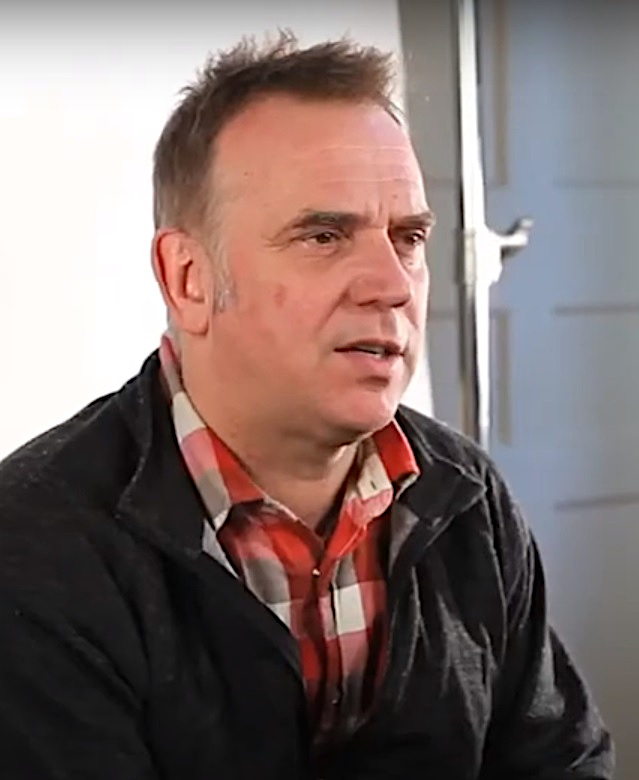
- Evans at JDIFF 2012
- Born: 1960 (age 65–66); Cardiff, Wales
- Occupations: Film and television director, producer, screenwriter
- Years active: 1987–present
- Spouse: Nia Roberts
- Children: 2

Marc Evans (born 1960) is a Welsh director of film and television, whose credits include the films House of America, Resurrection Man and My Little Eye.

== Biography ==
Evans was born in 1960 in Cardiff, Wales. He studied for a history of art degree at the University of Cambridge, and then took a year out before taking a one-year course in film at the University of Bristol, where one of his contemporaries was Michael Winterbottom.

=== Career ===
Evans worked as a runner for a commercials company in London, before beginning directing on TV dramas, starting out with Welsh-medium productions for S4C, and worked on episodes of The Ruth Rendell Mysteries.

He then switched to film, with House of America (1997) about a young immigrant coming from Wales to the United States, who falls foul of the American dream. In 1998 controversy started over his Resurrection Man, an extreme horror period drama set amid sectarian violence in Northern Ireland.

The later films of Marc Evans show a shift from an exploration of the relationships between national identity and myth, to an innovative reworking of the horror genre in the critically acclaimed My Little Eye, which tapped into the Zeitgeist via its embedded critique of the extremities of reality television and the internet. His first box office hit was the Big Brother-inspired horror film My Little Eye. In 2004 he directed Trauma starring Colin Firth, Mena Suvari and Brenda Fricker; script written by Richard Smith, which reprised the darker elements of My Little Eye via a chilling psychological study of amnesia and despair.

In 2006, he directed the Canadian feature film Snow Cake, starring Sigourney Weaver and Alan Rickman. His documentary In Prison My Whole Life, about death row inmate Mumia Abu-Jamal, premiered at the 2007 London Film Festival and was selected for the Sundance Film Festival in 2008.

Evans, in an interview at Cineworld Cinema in Cardiff, declared that he was working on a musical set in Swansea of the year 1976, with Catherine Zeta-Jones attached, which then changed to become Minnie Driver. The film, Hunky Dory, premiered at the 55th BFI London Film Festival and was released on 2 March 2012, in the UK and Ireland. The film also starred Kimberley Nixon and Aneurin Barnard, the West End Actor of Spring Awakening .

He appeared in A Life in the Death of Joe Meek, an independent documentary about the British record producer Joe Meek, which he was initially slated to direct.

Also in 2012, Marc Evans directed the ITV produced Doors Open, a television adaptation of a book by the crime novelist Ian Rankin. The film told the story of a self-made millionaire, an art professor and a banker, who came together to undertake an audacious art heist. The TV movie starred Douglas Henshall and Stephen Fry.

Evans also directed the documentary feature titled Jack to a King – The Swansea Story, about the rise of Swansea City Football Club to the Premier League over a decade. It was produced by YJB Films and was released on 12 September 2014. During the documentary production, Evans admitted that, The thing that appealed to me the most was that it was something totally outside my experience and a story I’d not heard before. It was a film without any adult supervision – it was there for the taking as no one said how it had to be made. We were free to make the kind of film we felt we could make.

Evans directed Cassy and Jude, a romantic comedy film based on the novel Cassandra at the Wedding by Dorothy Baker. The film was produced by Sam Taylor and Mike Downey of Film & Music Entertainment Ltd, and was executive produced by Stephen Daldry.

Also in 2012, it was rumoured that Marc Evans would direct another musical film, entitled Once Upon a Time in Wigan, about the northern soul scene in Wigan Casino set in the 1970s. However, he actually directed the Israeli-Palestinian comedy Birthright, produced by New York-based BoomGen Studios. The film told the story of a shy Jewish-American boy, who followed the girl of his dreams on a trip to Israel, only to wind up lost in Palestine. The script for this movie was written by Ari Issler and Ben Snyder, after they had been on a trip to Israel.

Evans was a visiting professor at the University of Glamorgan's creative arts school ATRiuM.

In 2024, Marc Evans directed Mr Burton, a film about the life struggles of the actor Richard Burton.

In 2026 the film that he had directed, Effi o Blaenau, based on the play Iphigenia in Splott (inspired by the ancient Greek play Iphigenia in Aulis) was first shown at the Glasgow Film Festival and then on general release in cinemas. It was a Welsh-language film with English subtitles.

=== Personal life ===
Marc Evans is married to actress Nia Roberts; the couple live in Cardiff, and have a daughter, Edith.

== Filmography ==
=== Films ===
Director

Year	Title	Notes
1994	Arthur's Departure	
1997	House of America	BAFTA Cymru Award for Best Director
1998	Resurrection Man	
2002	My Little Eye	
2004	Trauma	
2006	Snow Cake	
2010	Patagonia	Also writer
2011	Hunky Dory	
2015	Cassy and Jude	
2025	Mr Burton	
2026	Effi o Blaenau	

Executive producer

- Cymru Fach (2008)

=== Television ===
TV movies

- Le jeu du roi (1991)
- Thicker than Water (1994)
- Bliss (1995)
- Doors Open (2012)

TV series

- East of the Moon (1988)
- Letters from Patagonia (1988)
- The Gift (1990, mini-series, co-director)
- Friday on My Mind (1992)
- The Ruth Rendell Mysteries: "Master of the Moor" Parts 1, 2 and 3 (1994)
- Collision (2009, mini-series)
- Playhouse Presents: "Gifted" (2013)
- Hinterland: "Devil's Bridge" (2013)
- Safe House (2017)
- Manhunt (2019 - 2021)
- The Pembrokeshire Murders (2021)
- Steeltown Murders (2023)

=== Documentary films ===
Year	Title	Director	Writer
1994	Silent Village	Yes	No
2000	Beautiful Mistake	Yes	Yes
2003	Dal: Yma/Nawr	Yes	No
2007	In Prison My Whole Life	Yes	Yes
2014	Jack to a King – The Swansea Story	Yes	No
2019	The Prince and The Bomber	Yes	No
