= Cassy and Jude =

- Directed by: Marc Evans
- Screenplay by: Bruno Heller; Ali Cook; Michelle Lipton
- Based on: Cassandra at the Wedding by Dorothy Baker
- Produced by: Sam Taylor; Mike Downey; Jonathan Finn; Ed Rigg; Ali Cook
- Production company: Film and Music Entertainment
- Country: United Kingdom
- Language: English

Cassy and Jude is an unreleased British romantic comedy film directed by Marc Evans, based on the novel Cassandra at the Wedding by Dorothy Baker.

== Plot ==
A young woman's life is sent into a tailspin when she finds out her twin sister is marrying someone she just recently met.

== Production ==
Cassy and Jude is adapted from the novel Cassandra at the Wedding by Dorothy Baker, with a screenplay by Bruno Heller. In December 2010, British director, Dominic Murphy signed on to direct the project. In 2013, it was announced that Marc Evans had replaced Murphy as director for the project with its international sales handled by Germany's BetaCinema and funded by Film Agency Wales. Photography was completed in 2015.
