= Doors Open (film) =

- ITV promotional poster
- Based on: Doors Open by Ian Rankin
- Written by: James Mavor; Mike Walden; Sandi Toksvig
- Directed by: Marc Evans
- Starring: Douglas Henshall; Stephen Fry; Lenora Crichlow; Brian McCardie; Kenneth Collard
- Theme music composer: Jeremy Holland-Smith
- Country of origin: United Kingdom
- Original language: English

Production
- Cinematography: George Steel
- Editor: Mali Evans
- Running time: 120 minutes
- Production company: Sprout Pictures

Original release
- Network: ITV
- Release: 26 December 2012

Doors Open is a 2012 Scottish thriller heist film directed by Marc Evans, starring Douglas Henshall, Stephen Fry, Lenora Crichlow and Kenneth Collard. It is based on the 2008 novel of the same name by Ian Rankin, about a self-made millionaire, an art professor and a banker, who come together to undertake an audacious art heist. The film was commissioned by ITV and produced by Stephen Fry's Sprout Pictures production company. It premiered on ITV on 26 December 2012 in the United Kingdom.

== Plot ==
After an evening of drinking with Professor Gissing (Fry), an art expert, and banker Allan Cruickshank (Collard), self-made millionaire Mike McKenzie (Henshall) and his friends devise a plan to rob one of the country's most high-profile targets – Edinburgh's private art collection owned by a national bank.

== Cast ==
- Douglas Henshall as Mike McKenzie
- Stephen Fry as Professor Gissing
- Lenora Crichlow as Laura Stanton
- Kenneth Collard as Allan Cruickshank
- Brian McCardie as Charlie Calloway
- Elliot Cowan as Bruce Cameron
- Philip Whitchurch as The Geordie
- Paul McCole as Glenn
- Rab Affleck as Hate
- Sarah McCardie as Carol
- Bobby Rainsbury as HR Woman
- Ellie O'Brien as Theresa

== Production ==
Principal photography began on 23 April 2012 in Edinburgh. Additional filming took place along the coast of the Scottish Borders and in Garvald, East Lothian, while saleroom scenes were filmed at the Edinburgh auction house Lyon & Turnbull.
