= Robert Woof =

Robert Woof may refer to:

- Robert Woof (politician) (1911–1997), British Labour Party politician, MP 1956–1979
- Robert Woof (heritage administrator) (1931–2005), English academic
