= Laurence Coriat =

French screenwriter and short film director

- Born: France
- Occupations: Screenwriter, film director

Laurence Coriat is a French screenwriter and short film director, best known for her work with Michael Winterbottom.

== Biography ==
Coriat was born in France and moved to England in her twenties. In 1999, she teamed with British filmmaker Michael Winterbottom on Wonderland which was selected in competition at Cannes in 1999 and won the best British Independent Film award that year. She would work with Winterbottom again on A Summer in Genoa. Other features include Me Without You, Hunky Dory and Patagonia.

In 2018, she wrote for the British crime drama television series McMafia, inspired by the book McMafia: A Journey Through the Global Criminal Underworld (2008) by journalist Misha Glenny.

== Filmography ==
Production	Notes	Distributor
Wonderland	Directed by Michael Winterbottom	USA Films
Me Without You	Directed by Sandra Goldbacher	Momentum Pictures
Genova	Directed by Michael Winterbottom	Metrodome
Patagonia	Directed by Marc Evans	Verve Pictures
Hunky Dory	Directed by Marc Evans	Entertainment One
Everyday	Directed by Michael Winterbottom	Channel 4
Ladygrey	Directed by Alain Choquart	Rézo Films
McMafia	Episode 1.5 (2018); Episode 1.6 (2018)	BBC One
