= This Year's Love =

This Year's Love may refer to:

- This Year's Love (film), a 1999 British film
- This Year's Love (song), a 1999 single by David Gray
