= Alice Oswald =

British poet (born 1966)

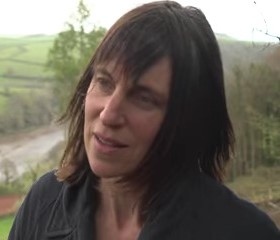
- Oswald in 2012
- Born: Alice Priscilla Lyle Keen; 31 August 1966 (age 60)
- Education: New College, Oxford
- Occupation: Poet
- Spouse: Peter Oswald
- Children: 3
- Relatives: Edward Curzon, 6th Earl Howe (grandfather); Will Keen (brother); Laura Beatty (sister); Dafne Keen (niece)
- Writing career
- Notable works: Dart; Falling Awake
- Notable awards: T. S. Eliot Prize (2002); Griffin Poetry Prize (2017)

Alice Priscilla Lyle Oswald (née Keen; born 31 August 1966) is a British poet from Reading, Berkshire. Her work won the T. S. Eliot Prize in 2002 and the Griffin Poetry Prize in 2017. In September 2017, she was named as BBC Radio 4's second Poet-in-Residence, succeeding Daljit Nagra. From 1 October 2019 until 30 September 2023, she was the Oxford Professor of Poetry.

== Biography ==
Oswald is the daughter of Charles William Lyle Keen and Lady Priscilla Mary Rose Curzon, daughter of Edward Curzon, 6th Earl Howe. Oswald read Classics at New College, Oxford. She then trained as a gardener and worked at such sites as Chelsea Physic Garden, Wisley and Clovelly Court Gardens. As of 2016, she was living near Totnes, Devon, with her husband, the playwright Peter Oswald, and her three children. Alice Oswald is the sister of actor Will Keen and writer Laura Beatty and the aunt of Keen's daughter Dafne.

== Works ==
In 1994, she was the recipient of an Eric Gregory Award. Her first collection of poetry, The Thing in the Gap-Stone Stile (1996), was shortlisted for a Forward Poetry Prize (Best First Collection) in 1996, as well as the T. S. Eliot Prize in 1997.

Her second collection, Dart (2002), combined verse and prose, and tells the story of the River Dart in Devon from a variety of perspectives. Jeanette Winterson called it a " … moving, changing poem, as fast-flowing as the river and as deep … a celebration of difference … ". Dart won the T. S. Eliot Prize in 2002.

In 2004, Oswald was named as one of the Poetry Book Society's Next Generation poets. Her collection Woods etc., published in 2005, was shortlisted for the Forward Poetry Prize (Best Collection).

In 2009, she published both A sleepwalk on the Severn and Weeds and Wildflowers, which won the inaugural Ted Hughes Award for New Work in Poetry, and was shortlisted for the T. S. Eliot Prize.

In October 2011, Oswald published her 6th collection, Memorial. Subtitled "An Excavation of the Iliad", Memorial is based on the Iliad attributed to Homer but departs from the narrative form of the Iliad to focus on, and so commemorate, the individual named characters whose deaths are mentioned in that poem. Later in October 2011, Memorial was shortlisted for the T. S. Eliot Prize, but in December 2011, Oswald withdrew the book from the short list, citing concerns about the ethics of the prize's sponsors. In 2013, Memorial won the Poetry Society’s Corneliu M. Popescu Prize for poetry in translation.

Oswald was a judge for the Griffin Poetry Prize in 2016. In 2017, she won the Griffin Poetry Prize for her seventh collection of poems, Falling Awake. A 2019 review of Nobody in the Guardian noted that "Oswald's element is water."

On 9 August 2025, Oswald, under Section 12 of the Terrorism Act, was among 532 people arrested in London at a protest where signs and placards in support of the proscribed group Palestine Action were displayed.

== Bibliography ==
=== Poetry ===
Collections

- 1996: The Thing in the Gap-Stone Stile, Oxford University Press, ISBN 0-19-282513-5
- 2002: Dart, Faber and Faber, ISBN 0-571-21410-X
- 2005: Woods etc. Faber and Faber, ISBN 0-571-21852-0
- 2009: Weeds and Wild Flowers, Faber and Faber, ISBN 978-0-571-23749-4
- 2009: A sleepwalk on the Severn, Faber and Faber, ISBN 978-0-571-24756-1
- 2011: Memorial, Faber and Faber, ISBN 978-0-571-27416-1
- 2016: Falling Awake, Jonathan Cape
- 2019: Nobody, Jonathan Cape
- 2020: A Short Story of Falling - Metal Engravings by Maribel Mas. Published by Andrew J Moorhouse, Fine Press Poetry

Anthologies (edited)

- 2002: Earth Has Not Any Thing to Shew More Fair: A Bicentennial Celebration of Wordsworth's Sonnet Composed upon Westminster Bridge (co-edited with Peter Oswald and Robert Woof), Shakespeare's Globe & The Wordsworth Trust, ISBN 1-870787-84-6
- 2005: The Thunder Mutters: 101 Poems for the Planet (editor), Faber and Faber, ISBN 0-571-21854-7
- 2024: Fate the Hunter: Early Arabic Hunting Poems (foreword), New York University Press, ISBN 9781479834259

List of poems

Title	Year	First published	Reprinted/collected
Evening poem	2016	Oswald, Alice (25 July 2016). "Evening poem". The New Yorker. 92 (22): 38.	

== Awards and recognition ==
- 1994: Eric Gregory Award
- 1996: Arts Foundation Award for Poetry
- 1996: winner of the Forward Poetry Prize (Best First Collection), The Thing in the Gap-Stone Stile
- 1997: shortlisted for T. S. Eliot Prize, for The Thing in the Gap-Stone Stile
- 2002: T. S. Eliot Prize for Dart
- 2005: shortlisted for Forward Poetry Prize (Best Poetry Collection of the Year), for Woods etc.
- 2005: shortlisted for T. S. Eliot Prize for Woods etc.
- 2007: Forward Poetry Prize (Best Single Poem) for 'Dunt'
- 2009: Ted Hughes Award for New Work in Poetry for Weeds and Wild Flowers
- 2011: short-listed for T. S. Eliot Prize, for Memorial, subsequently withdrawn due to Oswald's ethical concerns
- 2013: Warwick Prize for Writing, winner for Memorial
- 2013: Corneliu M. Popescu Prize for European Poetry, winner for Memorial
- 2016: Costa Award for Poetry for Falling Awake
- 2017: Griffin Poetry Prize for Falling Awake
