= Dart (poetry collection) =

2002 poetry collection by Alice Oswald

- Author: Alice Oswald
- Subject: River Dart
- Genre: Poetry
- Publication date: 2002
- Award: T. S. Eliot Prize

Dart is a book of poetry written by British poet Alice Oswald. It was published in 2002 and won the T. S. Eliot Prize for poetry.

== Content ==
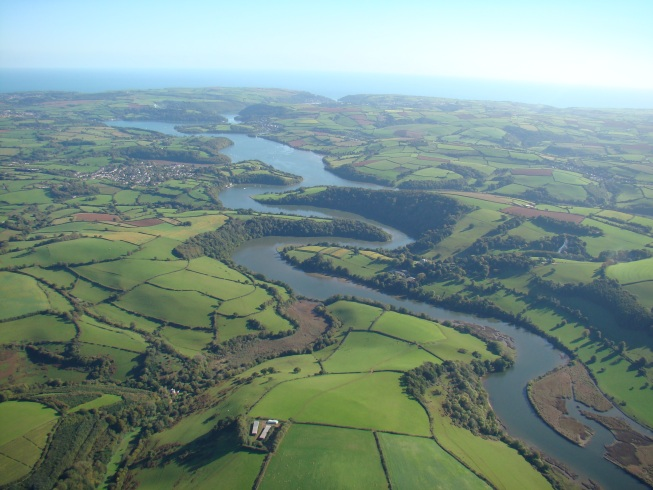
Aerial view of the River Dart, the book's subject

Dart consists of one long poem about the River Dart in Devon, England. It combines prose and poetry. Oswald is a gardener at Dartington Hall, an estate in South Devon. She spent three years recording her conversations with people who live and work on the river; the poem is her homage to them and to the river. The river, she said, has a "frightening female presence...she seemed female from the people I talked to".

Like the river, the poem starts on Dartmoor, and ends at Dartmouth, in the sea. People introduced along the way include "at least one mythical figure ("Jan Coo: his name means So-and-So of the Woods"), a naturalist, a fisherman and bailiff, dead tin miners, a forester, a water nymph, a canoeist, town boys, a swimmer, a water extractor, a dairy worker, a sewage worker, a stonewaller, a boat builder, a poacher, an oyster gatherer, a ferryman, a naval cadet, a river pilot and finally a seal watcher".

== Reception ==
Jeanette Winterson praised the poem on her website, saying "This moving, changing poem, as fast-flowing as the river and as deep, is a celebration of difference – the great variety of the natural world, and the escapes of the human spirit". David Wheatley said it was a "heartening book", and that "Oswald shows that poetry need not choose between Hughesian deep myth and Larkinesque social realism". He praised the poem as ambitious and said that Oswald "shows, post-New Generation, that wry ironies and streetwise demotic do not exhaust the available range of tonal and thematic possibilities".

The poem has been studied by ecocritics; Rowan Middleton, who published a lengthy article on the poem in Green Letters, a journal of ecocriticism, saw aspects of Claude Lévi-Strauss's bricolage in the poem. In response to critics of environmentalist works of art who object that works of art "that focus on physical connection with a local environment" fall short, because they lack a globalized interconnectedness, he argues that "Oswald’s poem transcends the physical through its engagement with the river’s spiritual and mythological aspects".
