= Sandra Goldbacher =

British film director, TV director, and screenwriter (born 1960)

- Born: Sandra A. Goldbacher; 1960 (age 65–66); Hampstead Garden Suburb, London, England, UK
- Citizenship: British
- Education: Sussex University; Middlesex University
- Occupations: Film screenwriter Film director TV director
- Known for: The Governess; Me Without You
- Spouse: Peter Salmi
- Children: 1

Sandra A. Goldbacher (born 1960) is a British film director, TV director, and screenwriter.

== Early life and education ==
Goldbacher grew up in Hampstead Garden Suburb in the London Borough of Barnet, the daughter of an Italian Sephardic Jewish father, a fruit importer, and a Protestant mother, who was a native of the Isle of Skye in Scotland. Her mother converted to Judaism when Goldbacher was a year old. Goldbacher's father was a Holocaust survivor. Goldbacher grew up as a Reform Jew. She said she encountered some anti-semitism growing up.

Goldbacher graduated from Sussex University as a French Literature major, and then did a year-long course at Middlesex University, studying film and video.

== Career ==
Goldbacher got her start directing commercials for The Observer Philips, Evian, Wella, Johnny Walker and Baileys. She also directed documentaries for the BBC series Building Sights, and two documentaries on boxing for Channel 4.

In 1994, Goldbacher made two shorts: Seventeen, which starred Rachel Weisz, and Piccadilly Circus By Night. She had made films while in college.

Goldbacher's first feature film, The Governess, starring Minnie Driver, which Goldbacher wrote based on a fictional diary that she wrote, was nominated for a BAFTA award in 1999 for best newcomer.

In 2001, she released her second film, Me Without You, which starred Anna Friel and Michelle Williams and was written by Goldbacher and Laurence Coriat. The movie had been in development before The Governess, but funding came earlier for the other film. Me Without You explores the "over-intense" relationship between two teenage girls. The film was loosely based upon a childhood friendship she had when she was younger. Both films featured Jewish characters and themes.

In 2007, Goldbacher directed the television film adaptation of Noel Streatfeild's book Ballet Shoes for BBC One, which starred Emma Watson.

In 2011, she wrote the book Matilda's Secret for the British doll company A Girl for All Time, which follows their character from Tudor times. She wrote two more books in this series, Amelia's Inheritance (2012) set during the Victorian period, and Clementine's Winter (2015) set during World War II.

In 2012, she directed two episodes of the second season of The Hour, starring Dominic West.

In 2016, Goldbacher directed an episode of the TV series Endeavour, set in 1967. Also in 2016, she directed two episodes of the British TV series Victoria. In 2017, she directed an episode of the TV series Anne with an E.

In 2018, Goldbacher directed the first series of the Amazon TV series Ordeal by Innocence, starring Bill Nighy and Alice Eve. It was an adaptation of the 1958 book by Agatha Christie.

In 2019, Goldbacher directed the four-episode Channel 4 mini-series, The Accident, which was created by and written by Jack Thorne, and is about a small Welsh community and how it copes with a devastating explosion.

== Personal life ==
In 1999, Goldbacher married writer/producer Peter Salmi. They have one child.

== Awards and honours ==
Award	Year	Category	Nominated work	Result	Ref(s)
Chicago International Film Festival	1994	Silver Plaque	Seventeen	Won	
Dinard Festival of British Cinema	1999	Golden Hitchcock	The Governess	Nominated	
Dinard Festival of British Cinema	2001	Golden Hitchcock	Me Without You	Nominated	
BAFTA	1999	Carl Foreman Award for the Most Promising Newcomer in British Film	The Governess	Nominated	
BAFTA	2002	Alexander Korda Award for the Outstanding British Film of the Year (with Finola Dwyer)	Me Without You	Nominated	
Karlovy Vary International Film Festival	1999	Crystal Globe	The Governess	Nominated	
Karlovy Vary International Film Festival	1999	Audience Award	The Governess	Won	
Karlovy Vary International Film Festival	1999	Special Prize (or an author debut)	The Governess	Won	
Karlovy Vary International Film Festival	1999	Kodak Vision Award	The Governess	Won	

== Filmography ==
- 1983: Barbie Dolls and War Toys short film – photography
- 1983: Polka Dots and Moonbeams short film – co-director
- 1984: Night of a Thousand Eyes short film – co-director, editor
- 1990: Brendan's Boys TV – director
- 1993: Born to Be Wild TV – director
- 1993: Josie Lawrence TV – director
- 1993: Conceptions and Misconceptions TV – director
- 1994: Seventeen short film – director, script
- 1994: Building Sights TV show – director (episodes: "Grand Central Terminal", "John Hancock Center")
- 1995: Piccadilly Circus by Night short film – director, written by
- 1998: The Governess – director, written by
- 1999: The Devil's Chimney – director
- 2001: Me Without You – director, screenplay
- 2007: Ballet Shoes – director
- 2012: The Hour – director (episodes: Episode #2.1, Episode #2.2)
- 2016: Endeavour TV series – director (episode: "Ride")
- 2016: Victoria TV series – director (series 1 - episode 3: "The Clockwork Prince", episode 4: "An Ordinary Woman")
- 2017: Anne with an E TV series – director (episode: "But What Is So Headstrong as Youth?")
- 2018: Ordeal by Innocence TV series – director (all 3 episodes)
- 2019: The Accident TV series – director (episodes: Episode #1.1, Episode #1.2, Episode #1.3, Episode #1.4)
- 2023: The Reckoning TV series – director

== Works or publications ==
- Goldbacher, Sandra (22 November 2001). "Sandra Goldbacher on her new film". The Guardian.
- Goldbacher, Sandra (2011). Matilda's Secret – A girl for all time book. London: Daughters of History Ltd. ISBN 9780956720009. OCLC 801568399.
- Goldbacher, Sandra; Robinson, Louise (Illustrated by); Salmi, Peter (illustrated by) (2012). Amelia's Inheritance – A girl for all time book. London: Daughters of History Ltd. ISBN 9780956720023. OCLC 843341997.
- Goldbacher, Sandra (2015). Clementine's Winter – A girl for all time book. London: Daughters of History Ltd. ISBN 9780956720047. OCLC 975427347.
