= Falling Awake (poetry collection) =

2016 poetry collection by Alice Oswald

- First edition (p/b)
- Author: Alice Oswald
- Language: English
- Genre: Poetry
- Publisher: Jonathan Cape
- Publication date: 7 July 2016
- Publication place: United Kingdom
- Pages: 81
- Awards: 2016 Costa Poetry Award; 2017 Griffin Poetry Prize
- ISBN: 9781910702437

Falling Awake is a 2016 poetry collection by English poet Alice Oswald, published by Jonathan Cape. Her seventh book of poetry, it won the 2016 Costa Book Award for Poetry and the 2017 Griffin Poetry Prize.

== Content ==
The book is Oswald's seventh poetry collection. It was met with critical acclaim upon release.

The poems explore themes relating to nature, mutability, and cycles of rebirth, as well as mythology. The final poem in the collection, Tithonus (46 Minutes in the Life of the Dawn), is meant to be experienced over the course of 46 minutes as when Oswald performs it live. The span of corresponds to the amount of time between pitch-darkness and dawn on a typical midsummer morning in her native Devon.

== Critical reception ==
Upon its release, Falling Awake was met with widespread critical acclaim in a variety of publications, including The Guardian, The New Yorker, and The London Magazine.

Writing in The Guardian, Kate Kellaway described it as "an astonishing book of beauty, intensity and poise – a revelation."

Jeremy Noel-Tod wrote that "Falling Awake "glittering in the gaps between things" confirms [Oswald] as one of the most gifted English poets of the past 20 years" in The Sunday Times.

== Awards ==
Year	Award	Category	Result	Ref.
2016	Costa Book Awards	Poetry	Won	
2016	Forward Prizes for Poetry	Collection	Shortlisted	
2016	T. S. Eliot Prize	—	Shortlisted	
2017	Griffin Poetry Prize	—	Won	
