= Hunky Dory (film) =

- Promotional poster
- Directed by: Marc Evans
- Written by: Laurence Coriat
- Produced by: Jonathan Finn; Dan Lupovitz
- Starring: Minnie Driver; Haydn Gwynne; Bob Pugh; Owen Teale; Steve Speirs; Aneurin Barnard
- Cinematography: Charlotte Bruus Christensen
- Music by: Joby Talbot
- Production companies: Aegis Film Fund; Mulligan and Nesbitt Productions; Prescience
- Distributed by: Entertainment One
- Release dates: 25 October 2011 (London Film Festival); 2 March 2012 (United Kingdom)
- Running time: 110 minutes
- Country: United Kingdom
- Language: English
- Box office: $20,296

Hunky Dory is a 2011 British independent musical film about the trials of an idealistic drama teacher as she tries to put on the end-of-year show. It was written by Laurence Coriat and directed by Welsh director Marc Evans and stars Minnie Driver, Aneurin Barnard, Kimberley Nixon and Robert Pugh. It premièred at the 55th BFI London Film Festival on 25 October 2011, and was officially released on 2 March 2012 in the UK.

== Plot ==
Set in a Welsh comprehensive school during the summer of 1976, keen drama teacher Vivienne fights general teenage apathy to put on a glam rock musical version of Shakespeare's The Tempest of which David Bowie (whose album provides the name of the film) might be proud.

To engage her students and encourage them to explore and express their emotions, Vivienne uses popular songs performed by a cast led by Davey. She intends for her teaching approach to help them discover areas of interest, reduce inhibitions, and participate in creative activities, while also studying Shakespeare.

Vivienne's aspirations appear thwarted by her troublesome students who, raging with hormones, get up to various antics that seem destined to sabotage the musical. She also faces opposition from traditionally-minded, old-fashioned teaching staff, making getting the show to opening night a constant challenge.

When a frustrated student sets fire to the school auditorium destroying the stage and the sets, the show is cancelled by the headmaster, who was to play Prospero. A side plot involves conflict between Vivienne's liberalism and the attitudes of her long-standing opponents on the staff, centering on discovering which "delinquent" student was responsible for the arson.

Deflated, but ultimately unwilling to chart this mishap or her role as "music teacher" as yet another thing she's failed at, Vivienne persuades the headmaster to allow the production to move to an outdoor setting. Her production is a triumph, much enjoyed by both the students and the audience.

The film ending features a photo-montage of what became of each student after leaving school. Vivienne had remained as music teacher, directing a school play every year until retirement.

== Cast ==
- Minnie Driver as Vivienne
- Aneurin Barnard as Davey
- Owen Teale as Davey's Dad
- Danielle Branch as Stella
- Robert Pugh as Headmaster
- Haydn Gwynne as Mrs Valentine
- Steve Speirs as Mr Cafferty
- Aled Pugh as Tim
- Julia Perez as Sylvie
- Kimberley Nixon as Vicki Munro
- Tom Rhys Harries as Evan
- Kristian Gwilliam as Hoople/ Andy Dixon
- Kayleigh Bennett as Dena Davies
- Jodie Davis as Mandy
- George MacKay as Jake Zeppi
- Adam Byard as Lewis Munro
- David Garner as Mac
- Gemma Perry as Art Girl

== See also ==
- Musical film
