= Howard Baker (poet) =

American writer (1905–1990)

- Born: April 5, 1905; Philadelphia, Pennsylvania
- Died: July 25, 1990 (aged 85); Porterville, California
- Occupations: Poet; dramatist; literary critic

Howard Wilson Baker Jr (April 5, 1905 – July 25, 1990) was an American poet, dramatist, and literary critic.

== Background ==
Baker was born in Philadelphia. While pursuing graduate studies in English at Stanford University, he befriended Yvor Winters, and was co-editor of the literary magazine The Gyroscope. After earning his master's degree, he moved to Paris to study at the Sorbonne. While there, he married the novelist Dorothy Baker, and met and was influenced by Ernest Hemingway and Ford Madox Ford, who helped him to publish his first work, the autobiographical novel Orange Valley (1931).

After returning to the United States in 1931, he took a position teaching English at Berkeley. From 1937 to 1943, he then taught English at Harvard.

In addition to collaborating with his wife, Baker produced poetry collections of his own, including Letter from the Country (1941) and Ode to the Sea (1954), as well as a collection of essays on ancient Greek culture, Persephone's Cave: Cultural Accumulations of the Early Greeks (1979).

Baker died from cancer in Porterville, California on Wednesday, July 25, 1990.

== Research resources ==
- The Dorothy and Howard Baker papers, 1906-1990 (30 linear ft.) are housed in the Department of Special Collections and University Archives at Stanford University Libraries
