= Jack to a King =

- Theatrical release poster
- Directed by: Marc Evans
- Written by: Mal Pope
- Produced by: Gwenllian Hughes; James Marsh (associate producer); Mal Pope (executive producer); Edward Thomas (associate producer); David Canelo
- Cinematography: Catherine Derry
- Edited by: John Richards
- Music by: Mal Pope
- Production companies: YJB Films; Sapex Scripts
- Release date: 12 September 2014 (United Kingdom)
- Running time: 98 minutes
- Country: United Kingdom
- Language: English
- Box office: $114,061

Jack to a King: The Swansea Story is a 2014 British documentary film (directed by Marc Evans) about the Swansea City Football Club's history from July 2001 to May 2011. It focuses on the club's rise from almost going out of business at the bottom of the Football League to the glamour of the Premier League. The documentary was released on 12 September 2014.

== Production ==
Director Marc Evans stated that

"Jack to a King is essentially a cinematic celebration of a story that a lot of us are familiar with but don't know the detail of."

Executive producer Mal Pope added that

"This is a truly remarkable story of how a rag tag band of builders, housewives, teachers and travel agents came together to save their football club and ended up turning their city into a worldwide brand. A story of how sometimes even the wildest dreams can come true!"

Associate producer James Marsh agreed

"The rebirth of a neglected, provincial football club into genuine Premier League contenders is both a romantic modern day fairytale and a gripping thriller of a story. It's a remarkable and surprising tale which will make for an irresistible, highly emotional film that will appeal to anyone who's ever rooted for the underdog."

Photographs, video clips and footage taken by fans during matches participated by the football club are included into this documentary.

== Release ==
On 15 August 2014, the first teaser trailer was released on YouTube by the film's official site. On 22 August, a full-length trailer was released by YJB Films.

At the time of the film's release, Swansea were in joint top position of the Premier League.

The film was broadcast in two parts on the American television network (and broadcast home of the Premier League in the United States) NBC and NBCSN on 15 and 22 August 2015.

=== Box Office ===
Jack to a King made $114,061 in the United Kingdom.

=== Home media ===
Jack to a King was released on DVD on 26 December 2014.
