= Peter Oswald =

English playwright (born 1965)

Peter Charles Patrick Oswald (born 1965) is an English playwright specialising in verse drama. He was a resident at Shakespeare's Globe theatre in London from 1998 to 2009.

== Early life ==
Oswald was born the second of four children (eldest of three sons) of farmer and stockbroker Peter David Hamilton Oswald and Juliet (née McLaughlin), of Fliskmillan, Fife, Scotland. His uncle was Sir Julian Oswald, First Sea Lord from 1989 to 1993.

The Oswalds were landed gentry of Cavens, Dumfries, and Auchincruive (now named "Oswald Hall"), South Ayrshire, Scotland, descending from merchant George Oswald, Rector of the University of Glasgow from 1797 to 1799.

== Career ==
Oswald was the first playwright-in-residence at Shakespeare's Globe theatre, for which he wrote three plays, from 1998 to 2009. He was later playwright-in-residence at London's Finborough Theatre in West Brompton. Oswald established his own company, Heart's Tongue, to produce some of his plays.

In March 2022, Oswald was interviewed about his verse-drama plays on the podcast Hamlet to Hamilton: Exploring Verse Drama, hosted by Emily C. A. Snyder and Colin Kovarik.

== Personal life ==
Oswald is married to the poet Alice Oswald, with whom he has three children.

In March 2025, he embarked on a 150-mile walk from Bristol to London, planned to last 13 days, while fasting to observe Ramadan, in order to raise money for children in Gaza. He finished his journey on 31 March with an event at the Marylebone Theatre, hosted by comedian Jen Brister. Describing the trip, Oswald said, "This pilgrimage was an act of empathy and resistance. It was a public declaration that we will not look away".

== Books ==
- Peter Oswald; Mary Stuart. Samuel French, London (2006).
- Peter Oswald; The Golden Ass or the Curious Man. Comedy in three parts after the novel Metamorphoses by Lucius Apuleius. Oberon Books: London, GB (2002). ISBN 1-84002-285-X.
- Peter Oswald; Earth Has Not Any Thing to Shew More Fair: A Bicentennial Celebration of Wordsworth's Sonnet Composed upon Westminster Bridge (co-editor with Alice Oswald and Robert Woof). Shakespeare's Globe and The Wordsworth Trust (2002). ISBN 1-870787-84-6.
- Peter Oswald; Fair Ladies at a Game of Poem Cards. A drama in verses after an 18th-century Japanese puppet play by the kabuki playwright Chikamatsu Monzaemon. Methuen Drama, London, GB (1996) (U.S.: Heinemann, Portsmouth, New Hampshire). ISBN 0-413-71510-8.
