= Emily Woof =

English actor and author

- Born: 1969 or 1970 (age 55–56); Newcastle upon Tyne, Northumberland, England
- Education: Oxford University; École Philippe Gaulier Lancaster University
- Occupations: Actress and author
- Spouse: Hamish McColl
- Children: 2
- Parent: Dr Robert Woof

Emily Woof (born 1969 or 1970) is an English author, playwright, actor, and performer. Her work spans fiction, theatre, film, television, radio, short film and solo performance. She is the author of the novels The Whole Wide Beauty and The Lightning Tree both published by Faber & Faber. her third novel Ecstatic was acquired by Wilton Square Books and is due to be published in August 2026. She is also known for film and TV roles including Nancy in Alan Bleasedale's ITV adaptation of Oliver Twist with Andy Serkis as Bill Sykes, The Full Monty, The Woodlanders, Velvet Goldmine directed by Todd Haynes, Wondrous Oblivion, Silent Cry and The League of Gentlemen's Apocalypse.

== Early life ==
Woof was brought up in Newcastle upon Tyne and attended Heaton Comprehensive School. She went on to study English at Oxford University. Her father was the first director of the Wordsworth Trust, Robert Woof. Woof interrupted her degree to train in physical theatre and clown under Philippe Gaulier and Monika Pagneux at École Philippe Gaulier in Paris. She went on to train in trapeze at FoolTime in Bristol, and London's Circus Space.

Woof received a full scholarship to study at Lancaster University where she completed a PhD in Contemporary Arts in 2025. […]

== Author ==
Her first novel, The Whole Wide Beauty, was published in May 2010 by Faber & Faber. Her second novel The Lightning Tree was also published by Faber, in March 2015. Her third novel Ecstatic was acquired by Wilton Square Books and is due to be published in August 2026.

For BBC radio, she wrote Pianoman, Baby Love, and Home to The Black Sea. She has written and directed two short films, Between The Wars, and Meeting Helen.

== Theatre and Performance ==
Woof began writing and performing her own work while at university. Her early stage work included a trilogy of shows about gender Sex, Sex II, Sex III,^{[…]}. Sex III won a Fringe First and Perrier Pick of the Fringe, and was performed at The Royal Court Theatre. Her stage work combines music, dance and storytelling.

She wrote and performed Blizzard, produced by Soho Theatre in association with Shared Experience. The production ran in May 2024 and later at 59E59 Theaters in New York.^{[…]} Blizzard received the 2025 Offie for Creation. She re-wrote and performed and earlier work Revolver in 2025 and performed for seven nights at The Pleasance, Edinburgh. She will perform Revolver at Soho Theatre November 24th-December 5th 2026.

== Personal life ==
Woof is married to fellow actor/writer Hamish McColl. The couple have two children and live in North London.

== Filmography ==
Film

Year	Film	Role	Notes
1997	The Full Monty	Mandy	
1997	Photographing Fairies	Linda	
1997	The Woodlanders	Grace Melbury	
1998	Velvet Goldmine	Shannon	
1999	This Year's Love	Alice	
1999	Passion	Karen Holten	
2000	Pandaemonium	Dorothy Wordsworth	
2003	Wondrous Oblivion	Ruth Wiseman	
2005	The League of Gentlemen's Apocalypse	Lindsay	
2021	Mothering Sunday	Mrs. Sheringham	

Television

Year	Film	Role	Notes
1998	Killer Net	Suzie	Miniseries – 4 episodes
1999–2000	Oliver Twist	Nancy	Miniseries – 3 episodes
1999–2000	Daylight Robbery	Paula Sullivan	2 Miniseries – 8 episodes
2005	Nova	Lise Meitner	Season 33, Episode 3 "Einstein's Big Idea"
2005	Ian Fleming: Bondmaker	Ann Fleming	BBC docudrama
2014	The Smoke	Nina	2 episodes

Short films

- Going Going... as Anna (2000 short film – actor and writer)
- Between the Wars (2002 short film – director)
- Meeting Helen ... as Helen (2007 short film – actor, writer and director)

== Awards and nominations ==
- Screen Actors Guild Award for Outstanding Performance by a Cast in a Motion Picture (won) – The Full Monty (shared with cast)
- American Film Institute Award for Best Performance by an Actress in a Supporting Role (nomination) – Passion
- London Film Critics' Circle Award for British Supporting Actress of the Year (nomination) – Wondrous Oblivion
- 2025 Offie for Creation - Blizzard.
