= A Girl for All Time =

Doll line

- Type: Doll
- Invented by: Frances Cain
- Company: Daughters of History Ltd.
- Country: United Kingdom
- Availability: 2011–2025

A Girl for All Time was a British range of historical and modern dolls, doll accessories, and books founded by Frances Cain.

A Girl for All Time initially launched with a historical line of dolls, accessories and books which follows a fictional English family through 500 years of British history. In 2016, the company expanded to include contemporary dolls that featured friends who all live in modern day London.

Founder Frances Cain launched the brand at the London Toy Fair in 2012. The company has won a number of toy industry awards for design and craftsmanship, including 9 Oppenheim Toyportfolio awards.

The brand quietly ceased operating in 2025 due to tariffs in the second Trump administration with the closure of their US warehouse, which led to the brand’s closure.

== Dolls and accessories ==
A Girl for All Time produced two ranges: Your Historical Girl and Your Modern Girl. Both ranges featured 16" dolls, doll costumes, and other accessories. The dolls were all vinyl, with a vinyl torso and had articulated elbows and knees.

Your Historical Girl had seven characters. This line followed the adventures of the first-born girls of the fictional Marchmont family through 500 years from Tudor England to the present day. Matilda, Your Tudor Girl, was the first character in the range and lives during the reign of Henry VIII of England. Matilda keeps a secret diary and hides it away in her trunk which is then passed down to each first-born girl in each generation of Marchmont women.

The rest of the historical line included the following characters: Elinor, Your Elizabethan Girl, whose story is set in London at the end of Elizabeth I of England's reign. Then there was Lydia, Your Georgian Girl, whose story is set in Boston, Massachusetts, prior to the American Revolutionary War. Helena, Your Regency Girl, who is living in higher class Regency England. Amelia, Your Victorian Girl's story is set in 1880s London. Clementine, Your 1940s Girl, is set during the Blitz in London and Sam, Your 1960s Girl, lives in Paris in the mid-1960s.

Each doll came in a historically inspired costume, referencing the period each character lives in. Additional costumes and accessories were also available and three of the characters had novels that tell their stories. Some characters were re-released with slightly lower quality outfits, featuring velcro closures instead of the previous snap closures, and vinyl shoes rather than previous higher quality fabrics.

The brand's second range, Your Modern Girl, was a contemporary doll line featuring modern day friends who all live in England. There were four dolls in this line.

Maya, Your Modern Girl, was released in 2016 having been successfully funded by a Kickstarter campaign. She is a descendant of Matilda Marchomont. Nisha, Your Modern Girl, also released in 2016, is Maya's best friend and is mixed heritage Eastern Indian and British. Bex, Your Modern Girl, released in 2018, is Afro Caribbean. Max, Your Modern Boy, is the only boy from this brand.

Other accessories include the characters' stuffed pets, tea sets, costumes, and hairbrushes.

== Books ==
The company also offered a series of young adult novels featuring the Matilda, Amelia, and Clementine dolls, authored by Sandra Goldbacher.

- Matilda's Secret, Daughters of History Ltd, 2011, ISBN 978-0956720009. Matilda Marchmont travels from the countryside in Norfolk, England, to the Tudor court where she has been sent as lady-in-waiting to the Queen and where she befriends her own cousin, Katherine Howard, who becomes the fifth wife of Henry VIII but eventually dies at the Tower of London.
- Matilda's Keepsakes & Secrets, Daughters of History Ltd, 2011, is an activity book and scrapbook with Tudor era recipes, trivia, fashions and hair ideas.
- Amelia's Inheritance, Daughters of History Ltd, 2012, ISBN 978-0956720023. Victorian schoolgirl Amelia Elliot at thirteen finds herself recently orphaned and sent to live with her uncle. There she develops unlikely friendships and travels through London to reclaim her inheritance, a secret trunk left to her from her Tudor ancestor, Matilda.
- Clementine's Winter, Daughters of History Ltd, 2015, ISBN 978-0956720047. As war breaks out Clementine Harper and her two brothers migrate to the country to escape nightly air raids in London in There, whilst living with an eccentric widow in Devon, Clementine befriends Giesele, a German-Jewish girl escaping the Nazis. Mystery and adventure ensue as the pair join the local Girl Guides and seek to find Giesele's sister and parents.

== Recognition ==
"A Girl for All Time" dolls have received the following awards

- Dolls Magazine — Winner Playdoll of the Year 2014 and 2015
- Primary Teacher — Silver Award 2014
- Oppenheim Toy Portfolio Platinum 2012, 2013, 2014, 2015
- Dolls Magazine — Award of Excellence 2013
- Toy Talk’s Best Doll 2011, 2012, 2013
- Creative Child — Preferred Choice, Gold Seal 2012
- The School Run — 100 Best Educational Toys 2011
- Creative Choice Magazine (US) — Preferred Choice: Dolls, Seal of Excellence: Books 2011

== See also ==
- American Girl
