= The Governess =

1998 film

- Original poster
- Directed by: Sandra Goldbacher
- Written by: Sandra Goldbacher
- Produced by: Sarah Curtis; Sally Hibbin
- Starring: Minnie Driver; Tom Wilkinson; Harriet Walter; Florence Hoath; Bruce Myers; Jonathan Rhys Meyers
- Cinematography: Ashley Rowe
- Edited by: Isabelle Lorente
- Music by: Edward Shearmur
- Production companies: Pandora Cinema; BBC Films; Parallax Pictures
- Distributed by: Momentum Pictures; Alliance Films
- Release dates: 31 July 1998 (US); 23 October 1998 (UK); 3 December 1998 (Australia); 4 February 1999 (New Zealand)
- Running time: 114 minutes
- Country: United Kingdom
- Language: English
- Box office: $3.8 million (US)

The Governess is a 1998 British period drama film written and directed by Sandra Goldbacher. The screenplay focuses on a young Jewish woman of Sephardic background, who reinvents herself as a gentile governess when she is forced to find work to support her family.

== Plot ==
Set in the 1830s, the story centres on Rosina da Silva, the sophisticated eldest daughter of a wealthy Jewish family living in a small enclave of Sephardic London Jews. When her father is murdered on the street and leaves behind numerous debts, she refuses an arranged marriage to an older suitor, declaring that she will work to support her family, even if she has to take to the stage like her aunt, who is a renowned singer. She decides to use her classical education and advertise her services as a governess, transforming herself into Mary Blackchurch - a Protestant of partial Italian descent - in order to conceal her heritage. She quickly accepts a position as governess for a Scottish landed gentry family living on the Isle of Skye in the Hebrides. Patriarch Charles Cavendish is a man of science intent on solving the problem of retaining a photographic image on paper, while his pretentious wife flounders in a sea of ennui. Their young daughter Clementina initially resists Mary's discipline, but eventually finds in her a friend and companion.

Mary, well-educated and unusually curious in an era when a woman's primary focus is meant to be keeping house and attending to the needs of her family, surprises Charles with the depth of her interest and ability and becomes his assistant. He is delighted to find a kindred spirit in his isolation, and the admiration she feels soon turns to passion that he reciprocates. While secretly observing Passover in her room, she spills salt water onto one of Charles' prints, accidentally discovering a technique that preserves the image. The next morning she rushes to the laboratory to tell Charles, and their excitement spills over into making love for the first time. But he becomes increasingly consumed with the race to publish their new process, while she is captivated by the beauty of the photographs they create.

Complications ensue when the Cavendishs' son Henry returns home after being expelled from the University of Oxford for smoking opium and being caught with a prostitute, and he becomes obsessed with Mary. While searching through her belongings, he uncovers evidence of her true background, and although he confesses to her that he knows about her past, he promises to keep it secret. But eventually Henry tells Charles that he is in love with Mary, and Charles ridicules his affection and disparagingly remarks that Mary is "practically a demimondaine", refusing his consent and further alienating his son.

One day she leaves a gift for Charles, a nude photograph that she took of him asleep in the laboratory after lovemaking, and he begins to shun her. When a fellow scientist visits, Charles claims sole credit for the technique she discovered. Angered by his rebuff and betrayal, Mary at first takes it out on Henry, but then decides to leave the island and return to London. On her way out, conspicuously dressed as a Jew once more, she presents to Mrs Cavendish at their dinner table the picture of her naked husband.

Back in London, she embraces her true identity and becomes a portrait photographer noted for her distinct images of the Jewish people. Her sister announces her next sitter and when Charles appears, she quietly proceeds to take his portrait. When she has finished he asks her if they are done, and she says yes, "quite done," dismissing him. She muses to the audience in closing, "I hardly think of those days at all. No, I don't think of those days at all." But his portrait remains foremost among the scattering of prints in her personal studio.

== Cast ==
- Minnie Driver as Rosina da Silva / Mary Blackchurch
- Tom Wilkinson as Charles Cavendish
- Harriet Walter as Mrs. Cavendish
- Jonathan Rhys Meyers as Henry Cavendish
- Florence Hoath as Clementina Cavendish

== Production ==
The film was shot on location at Brodick Castle in North Ayrshire, Wrotham Park in Hertfordshire, and London. Interiors were filmed at the Pinewood Studios in Buckinghamshire.

For the soundtrack, composer Edward Shearmur relied on the piano, harp, stringed instruments, ethnic flutes, santour, violin, and Eastern percussion instruments to imitate Sephardi melodies of the era. Songs were performed in Ladino by Ofra Haza. The soundtrack also includes Ständchen, a song from the collection Schwanengesang by Franz Schubert.

== Reception ==
=== Critical response ===
The film debuted at the Seattle International Film Festival before going into limited release in the US. On its opening weekend it grossed $57,799 in six theaters. Its total box office in the US was $3,719,509. The film received positive reception from critics, especially for Driver's performance as Rosina da Silva.

In his review in The New York Times, Stephen Holden called the film "ravishingly handsome" and added, "The Governess is a wonderful showcase for Ms. Driver . . . If [her] performance is strong, it is less than great, because her face lacks the transparency of expression that would transport us inside her character's mind . . . The movie takes some missteps. Rosina's ability to support her family in luxurious style from her earnings as a governess is implausible. The screenplay includes some glaring lapses into contemporary slang. And dramatically, the movie peters out in its disappointingly perfunctory final scenes. But [it] still leaves a lasting after-image."

In Variety, Ken Eisner called the film "beautifully crafted" and said it "gets high marks for originality and style," then added, "Although first-time helmer Sandra Goldbacher, working from her own script, has come up with a fascinating premise, her follow-through is too scattered in concept and monotonous in execution to be truly rewarding . . . [It] has much to offer the senses . . . but the images are often art-directed to death, with more attention paid to fabrics, textures and colors than to narrative coherence. A little trimming could remove some of the distractions and repetition, but it won't be easy to hide the movie's lack of a solid point or payoff."

In Entertainment Weekly, Owen Gleiberman graded the film a C and called it "a have-your-kugel-and-eat-it-too princess fantasy. Writer-director Sandra Goldbacher glorifies her heroine at every turn, but she also fills the movie with arid pauses, turning it into a claustrophobic study in repression."

Barbara Shulgasser of the San Francisco Examiner observed, "Sandra Goldbacher, writing and directing her first feature, is a sure-handed filmmaker. The movie is a tableau of sensuality. The tactile attractiveness of the photographic images meld with the fire that devours the lovers . . . I found the end of the movie a bit of an anticlimax and sense that Goldbacher just ran out of steam. But it seems a sure bet that she has many more movies ahead of her, all of which I look forward to seeing."

Ruthe Stein of the San Francisco Chronicle said, "As Rosina's extraordinary fate unfolds in The Governess, the real wonder becomes how British filmmaker Sandra Goldbacher was able to write and direct such an accomplished, touching and original movie her first time out . . . Rosina is a wonderfully rich role, and Driver gives it everything she has. It's her best work yet."

On the review aggregator website Rotten Tomatoes, 65% of 34 critics' reviews are positive. Metacritic, which uses a weighted average, assigned the film a score of 60 out of 100, based on 25 critics, indicating "mixed or average" reviews. Audiences polled by CinemaScore gave it a grade of B.

=== Accolades ===
Ashley Rowe won the Evening Standard British Film Award for Best Technical/Artistic Achievement for his cinematography. Sandra Goldbacher was nominated for the Crystal Globe and won both the Audience Award and Special Prize at the Karlovy Vary International Film Festival.
