= Me Without You (film) =

2001 British film

- Film poster
- Directed by: Sandra Goldbacher
- Written by: Sandra Goldbacher; Laurence Coriat
- Produced by: Finola Dwyer
- Starring: Anna Friel; Michelle Williams; Kyle MacLachlan; Oliver Milburn
- Cinematography: Denis Crossan
- Edited by: Michael Ellis
- Music by: Adrian Johnston
- Production company: Capitol Films
- Distributed by: Momentum Pictures
- Release date: 23 November 2001
- Running time: 107 minutes
- Country: United Kingdom
- Language: English
- Box office: £155,000 (United Kingdom)

Me Without You is a 2001 British film starring Anna Friel, Michelle Williams, and Oliver Milburn, and written and directed by Sandra Goldbacher.

The film follows the troubled relationship between two girls as they grow up. Stephen Holden of The New York Times called it "psychologically savvy ... story of a toxic friendship, established in early childhood, whose poisons continue to circulate and infect both well into their adult lives."

== Plot ==
Next-door neighbours and best friends Holly and Marina are growing up together on the Isle of Wight in 1973. Holly is the child of supportive if stuffy Jewish parents, while Marina's mother is fixated on her looks and sexuality and her father is almost never around. Holly develops a crush on Marina's older brother, Nat.

In their teens in 1978, Marina convinces Holly to crash a party thrown by Nat's girlfriend, Carolyn, hoping to meet The Clash there. The party turns out to be sparsely attended by older kids abusing heroin. Marina eagerly tries it, while Holly declines. Carolyn leaves, and while Marina is shooting up, Holly and Nat kiss, and the two end up sleeping together, with Holly losing her virginity. At the same time, the boy who gave Marina the heroin coerces her into sex which leaves her upset afterward, worsened when she sees Holly and Nat together.

Marina lashes out at Holly, saying Nat only had sex with her because he was high and probably did not even recognize her. Nat wakes Marina the next morning before leaving for a trip with Carolyn and asks her to give Holly a note from him. Still reeling from the rape, Marina reads the note for Holly, in which Nat calls their night together beautiful and expresses hope of developing a relationship in the future, and bitterly rips it up. When Holly asks Marina if Nat said anything about the night before, Marina lies that he did not, but reassures Holly that they will always have each other.

By 1982, Holly and Marina are attending university together, where Holly becomes attracted to their tutor, Daniel. Noticing Holly's interest, and the way Daniel is drawn to her for their shared intellectual interests and religious background, Marina attempts to seduce him. Daniel carries on two-timing both of them, although his bond with Holly begins to grow stronger than his mainly sexual relationship with Marina. Nat comes to visit, and he and Holly's feelings for each other are rekindled. Holly goes to Daniel's place to break things off with him and be with Nat, but sees Daniel with Marina. Devastated by the betrayal, she pushes Nat away. She then confronts Marina, and the two fight. Marina vindictively ruins things between Holly and Nat by telling them both that the other one left without saying anything.

Marina and Nat's mother overdoses and they rush home to see her. Holly's parents invite Marina to stay at their house rather than be alone. She cries while reading Holly's diary about their childhood days and Holly's father comes to comfort her, but is repulsed when she tries to return a goodnight kiss on the head with one which is inappropriately sexual. The neighbors are reunited at a New Year's Eve gathering, at which Nat announces his intention to marry his French girlfriend Isabel.

In 1989, Holly has become a writer and Marina works in the entertainment industry. Each is dating a man the other set her up with. Nat comes over to Holly's apartment and they confess to always having had feelings for each other, despite Nat's marriage to Isabel. They are interrupted first by phone calls from Marina and then by Holly's boyfriend, Karl, returning, and Holly tells Nat to leave. On a visit home, Holly is blindsided by the news that Nat and Isabel are planning to try to conceive, while Marina intends to marry her boyfriend and convert to Judaism. Overwhelmed and disgusted by Marina's codependent behavior, Holly decides to accept a job in New York City, but Marina tries to stop her by telling her she is pregnant.

While reunited at a New Year's Eve party some time later and playing "Guess Who?", Nat begins to describe someone in a very intimate way. Holly guesses Isabel, but Isabel angrily says she knows he means Holly. Jealous, Marina proposes playing sardines. Holly and Nat find each other in the dark, and Holly reaffirms her feelings for him. They are about to kiss when Marina is shoved out of a closet by Karl, who has angrily refused her sexual advances on him. Holly runs outside after Marina and ends their friendship as Marina cries "there's no me without you!" After Holly asserts Marina is wrong and walks away, Nat catches up to her and asks if he can come with her. The two board a bus together.

In the final scene in 2001, Nat and Holly have a daughter, and Marina has a daughter and a son. Marina and Holly do not seem as close as they once were, although each accepts the other's presence for the sake of their daughters, who appear to be best friends and play together in the yard as their mothers used to do.

== Cast ==
- Anna Friel as Marina
  - Anna Popplewell as Young Marina
- Michelle Williams as Holly Rossman
  - Ella Jones as Young Holly Rossman
- Kyle MacLachlan as Daniel
- Oliver Milburn as Nat
  - Cameron Powrie as Young Nat
- Trudie Styler as Linda
- Marianne Denicourt as Isabel
- Adrian Lukis as Leo
- Steve John Shepherd as Carl
- Allan Corduner as Max
- Nicky Henson as Ray

== Reception ==
On Rotten Tomatoes the film has an approval rating of 66% based on 65 reviews. On Metacritic the film has a score of 67% based on reviews from 25 critics, indicating "generally favorable reviews".

Roger Ebert of the Chicago Sun-Times gave the film 3 and a half stars and said the film "has a bracing truth that's refreshing after the phoniness of female-bonding pictures like Divine Secrets of the Ya-Ya Sisterhood." He said that the film's treatment of character of Daniel was "rare" for a film of this sort in that had a "depth" "instead of simply being used as a plot ploy." He called Williams' performance a "surprise" for having a "perfectly convincing British accent, and is cuddly and smart both at once." Stephen Holden of The New York Times wrote: "Under its drab contemporary trappings, the movie, is really a Jane Austen–like moral parable in which goodness is rewarded and selfishness punished." Lou Carlozo of the Chicago Tribune praised the on screen chemistry between Friel and Williams.

Critic Richard Nilsen, said "Although the film deserves some points for trying to describe the intensity of best-friendship between girls, it fails to make them interesting people."

== Notable Filming Location ==
Queen's Pier, Ramsey
