= Jean Spangler =

American actress (1923–49?)

- Born: Jean Elizabeth Spangler; September 2, 1923; Seattle, Washington, U.S.
- Disappeared: October 7, 1949 (aged 26); Los Angeles, California, U.S.
- Status: Missing for 77 years, 1 month and 8 days
- Spouse: Dexter Benner (m. 1942; div. 1946)
- Children: 1

Jean Elizabeth Spangler (September 2, 1923 – disappeared October 7, 1949) was an American actress who appeared in bit parts in several Hollywood films in the late 1940s. She garnered public attention for her mysterious disappearance in late 1949.

Born in Seattle, Washington, Spangler attended high school in Los Angeles, California, before beginning a career in film in 1948, appearing as a dancer in several uncredited roles, including in Walter Lang's When My Baby Smiles at Me (1948), the comedy Chicken Every Sunday (1949), and the musical drama Young Man with a Horn (1950).

On the evening of October 7, 1949, Spangler left her home in Los Angeles, telling her sister-in-law that she was going to meet with her ex-husband before going to work as an extra on a film set. She was last seen alive at a grocery store several blocks from her home at approximately 6:00 p.m. Two days later, Spangler's tattered purse was discovered in a remote area of Griffith Park, approximately 5.5 miles (8.9 km) from her home; inside was a letter addressed to a "Kirk", which mentioned seeing a doctor. Given Spangler's recent work on the film Young Man with a Horn starring Kirk Douglas, he called police to clear his name, telling them he was in Palm Springs at the time, which police accepted.

Spangler's disappearance generated various theories, which ranged from her alleged death in a botched abortion to her fleeing with Los Angeles gangsters with whom she was acquainted. To date, no additional evidence has been uncovered in Spangler's case, and her whereabouts remain unknown.

== Early life ==
Jean Elizabeth Spangler was born on September 2, 1923, in Seattle, Washington, as the youngest of the four children of Cecil Martin Spangler and Florence Matilda Morris. She had two brothers, Richard Martin and Edward Franklin Spangler, and an older sister, Betsy Anne Shreckengaust. She attended Franklin High School in Los Angeles, California, and graduated in 1941. As a teen, Spangler had danced with the Earl Carroll Theatre and Florentine Gardens.

In 1942, Spangler married manufacturer Dexter Benner. They had a daughter, Christine, and divorced in 1946. Spangler and Benner engaged in a long custody battle over their daughter, until Spangler was eventually awarded custody in 1948. At the time of her disappearance, she lived with her mother Florence, five-year-old daughter Christine, brother Edward, and sister-in-law Sophie, on Colgate Avenue in the Park La Brea residential complex near Wilshire Boulevard.

== Disappearance ==
On Friday, October 7, 1949, Spangler left her home in Los Angeles around 5:00 p.m. She left her daughter with Sophie and said that she was meeting Benner to discuss a late child support payment; after that, she was going to work on a night shoot for a film. Two hours after leaving, Spangler called home and spoke with Sophie as well as her daughter; she told Sophie she would "have to work the full eight hours" and would probably not return home that evening. At the time, Spangler's mother Florence was out of town visiting family in Louisville, Kentucky. The following morning, October 8, Sophie went to the police and filed a missing person report after Spangler failed to return home.

Though Spangler had told her sister-in-law that she was going to work on a film set after she met with Benner, police checked with studios and the Screen Extras Guild and found no records indicating she had worked that night. A saleswoman at the Farmers Market, only a few blocks from Spangler's home, recalled seeing her browsing around 6 p.m., and noted that she "appeared to be waiting for someone." This was the last known sighting of Spangler. Police questioned Benner about her statement to Sophie that she was going to meet him about his child support payments. He claimed that he had not seen his former wife for several weeks. His new wife, Lynn Lasky Benner (1924–2019), to whom he had been married only one month, corroborated his story.

== Handbag and note discovery ==
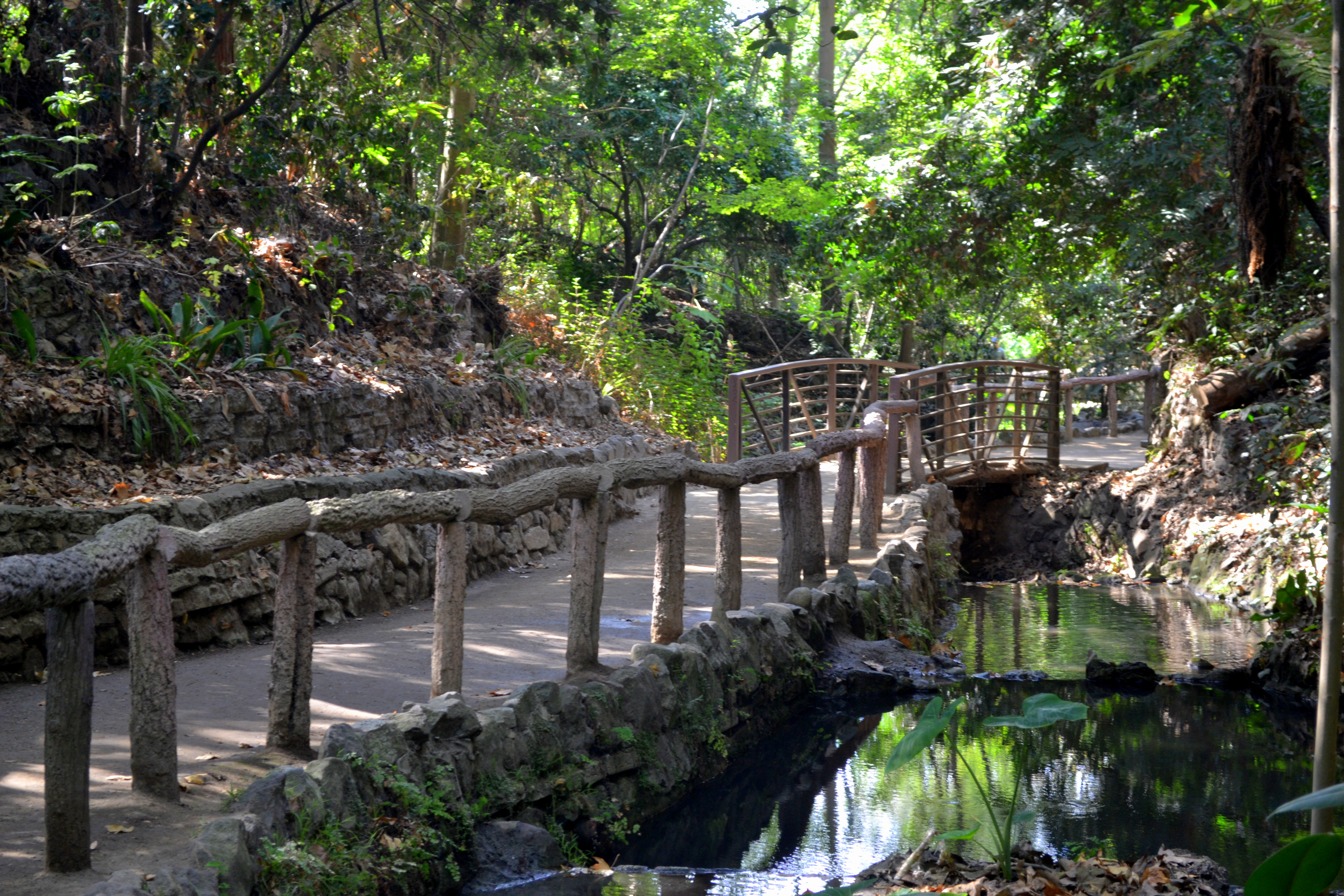
Fern Dell section of Griffith Park, where Spangler's purse was discovered

Kirk: Can't wait any longer, Going to see Dr. Scott. It will work best this way while mother is away,

— Handwritten note found in Spangler's purse in Griffith Park

On October 9, 1949, Spangler's purse was found near the Fern Dell entrance of Griffith Park in Los Angeles, approximately 5.5 miles (8.9 km) from her home. Both of the straps on one side of the purse were torn loose as if it had been ripped from her arm. Sixty police officers and over one hundred volunteers searched the 4,107-acre (16.62 km^{2}) natural terrain park, but no other clues were found. There was no money in the purse (Sophie said that Spangler had no money when she left the house the evening of her disappearance) so the police ruled out robbery as a motive. There was a note in the purse addressed to a "Kirk", which read: "Kirk: Can't wait any longer, Going to see Dr. Scott. It will work best this way while mother is away,". The note ended in a comma.

Neither "Kirk" nor "Dr. Scott" could be located, and neither Spangler's family nor her friends knew anyone by those names. When Spangler's mother, Florence, returned to Los Angeles, she told police that someone named "Kirk" had picked up Jean at her house twice but stayed in his car and did not come in. Police questioned every doctor with the last name Scott in Los Angeles, but none of them had a patient with the last name Spangler or Benner, her married name. Spangler had once been involved with an abusive man she called "Scotty", but her lawyer said she had not seen him since 1945. Griffith Park was searched over the following week by over 200 volunteers and law enforcement. During the search, one volunteer's dog dug up a denim Los Angeles County Jail uniform in a shallow hole, but no other belongings of Spangler were found.

== Theories and alleged sightings ==
At the time she disappeared, Spangler had recently completed filming a bit part in the film Young Man with a Horn starring Kirk Douglas; this led to public speculation that he was the Kirk mentioned in the note found in her purse. Upon reading about the discovery of the note, Douglas himself called the police and denied that he knew Spangler. Later, when interviewed via telephone by the head of the investigating team, Douglas admitted that he had "talked and kidded with her a bit" on set, but that he had never spent time with her outside of the film production. On October 12, Douglas gave a formal press statement in which he said: "I told Detective Chief Thad Brown that I didn't remember the girl or the name until a friend recalled it was she who worked as an extra in a scene with me in my picture Young Man with a Horn ... then I recalled that she was a tall girl in a green dress. I talked and kidded with her a bit on the set ... But I never saw her before or after that and have never been out with her."

Spangler's friends told police that she was three months pregnant when she disappeared and that she had talked about having an abortion, which at the time was illegal. Witnesses who frequented the same nightclubs and bars as Spangler told police they had heard of a former medical student known as "Doc", who performed abortions for money, but police could not locate him, nor prove that he existed. The theory that Spangler disappeared under circumstances related to a botched abortion attempt was investigated by the Los Angeles Police Department (LAPD). Spangler had also told her friend actor Robert Cummings that she was having a casual affair at the time, but did not mention the identity of the man. When Cummings asked her if it was serious, she responded: "No. But I'm having the time of my life."

At the time, some newspapers reported that Spangler was feared to be one of several female victims in a series of killings in Los Angeles potentially linked to the Black Dahlia murder in 1947, given her hair colouring and resemblance to victim Elizabeth Short. Another theory investigated by police was that Spangler's disappearance was related to Los Angeles gangsters with whom she purportedly was associated. According to historian Jon Lewis in his book Hard-Boiled Hollywood: Crime and Punishment in Postwar Los Angeles, Spangler had worked for a time as a dancer at Florentine Gardens, a nightclub owned by Mark Hansen and Nils Thor Granlund. Lewis claims that her acquaintance with Hansen and Granlund "put her in the orbits" of various mob affiliates, including Anthony Cornero and Mickey Cohen. Spangler had allegedly been seen with Davy Ogul, an associate of Cohen's, in Palm Springs, as well as in Las Vegas, Nevada, with Ogul and Frank Niccoli, another associate of Cohen's. Ogul disappeared on October 9, 1949, two days after Spangler. This led police to investigate the possibility that Spangler and Ogul, who was under indictment for conspiracy, had fled to avoid prosecution. Police interrogated Thomas Ellery Evans, a gangster and acquaintance of Ogul, during their investigation. In April 1950, Spangler's sister Betsy testified that neither she nor her sister were ever acquainted with Ogul, Cohen, or any of his associates. When the men's bodies were later found – probably the victims of a mob hit – it was Jean's mother, Florence, who insisted that her daughter was not the kind of girl to get mixed up with gangsters.

In 1950, a customs agent in El Paso, Texas, reported seeing Ogul and a woman who looked like Spangler in a local hotel. The hotel clerk identified Spangler from a photograph, but neither Ogul nor Spangler's names appeared on the hotel register.

== Aftermath ==
Shortly after Spangler disappeared, custody of her and Benner's daughter, Christine, was temporarily awarded to Benner on October 27, 1949. The following year, a custody battle ensued between Benner and Florence, to whom he denied visitation with Christine. Benner defied a court order that he permit Spangler's mother to visit the child. When Benner was ordered to serve fifteen days in jail for being in contempt of court, he fled California with his daughter, and later settled in Florida. Benner died on May 7, 2007, in Jacksonville, Florida.

The LAPD continued the search and circulated Spangler's picture for several years, in an unsuccessful attempt to find her or any reliable leads. Columnist Louella Parsons offered a $1,000 reward for information concerning Spangler's disappearance or location. Despite a nationwide search, no further clues have surfaced. Possible sightings over the next two years included northern and southern California, Phoenix, Arizona, and Mexico City, but none of those sightings could be validated. She is still listed as a missing person, and the LAPD still considered the case "open" as of 2017.

== Filmography ==
Year	Title	Role	Notes	Ref.
1948	The Miracle of the Bells	Extra in Church		
1948	When My Baby Smiles at Me	Chorus Girl		
1949	Chicken Every Sunday	Dancer		
1950	Young Man with a Horn	Hula Dancer		
1950	Wabash Avenue	Showgirl		
1950	Champagne for Caesar	TV Studio Audience Member		
1950	The Petty Girl	Nightclub Patron		

== In popular culture ==
Spangler's disappearance was fictionalized by Megan Abbott in her novel The Song Is You (New York: Simon and Schuster, 2006), ISBN 978-0743291712.

== See also ==
- List of people who disappeared mysteriously: 1910–1990

== Works cited ==
- Lewis, Jon (2017). Hard-Boiled Hollywood: Crime and Punishment in Postwar Los Angeles. Los Angeles: University of California Press. ISBN 978-0-520-95991-0.
- Mayo, Mike (2008). American Murder: Criminals, Crimes, and the Media. Canton, Michigan: Visible Ink Press. ISBN 978-1-578-59256-2.
