= Silent Cry (film) =

- Genre: Crime • Thriller
- Written by: Simon Lubert
- Directed by: Julian Richards
- Starring: Emily Woof; Douglas Henshall; Frank Finlay; Clive Russell; Kevin Whately; Craig Kelly
- Composer: David A. Hughes
- Country of origin: United Kingdom
- Original language: English

Production
- Executive producers: Robert Bevan; Amanda Coombes; Keith Hayley; Harry Hicks
- Producers: Tim Dennison; Peter La Terriere
- Cinematography: Tony Imi
- Editor: Les Healey
- Running time: 85 minutes
- Production companies: First Foot Films; Little Wing Films

Original release
- Network: Channel 5
- Release: 2003

Silent Cry is a British television crime thriller film, first broadcast on Channel 5 in 2003, that follows the story of a young girl named Rachel (Emily Woof), who is told that her new-born baby has died shortly after birth. Rachel, however, later begins to suspect that the baby may have in fact been abducted and sets about discovering the truth. The film was directed by Julian Richards and stars Woof, Douglas Henshall, Frank Finlay, Clive Russell, Kevin Whately and Craig Kelly. It was released on Region 1 DVD in the United States on 20 August 2013.

Internationally, the film was broadcast in Germany by ZDF under the title Albtraum ohne Ende, and in Eastern Europe and Latin America by HBO. The film was also released on DVD in Australia, Germany and Sweden; with the German adaptation re-titled Schrei in der Dunkelheit and the Swedish adaptation re-titled Allt Har Ett Pris. The film won the Gold Remi Award at the WorldFest-Houston International Film Festival in 2004, and Woof was also awarded the accolade of Best Actress at both the Love is Folly film festival in Bulgaria and the Bruxelles film festival in Belgium.

== Synopsis ==
Rachel Stewart (Emily Woof) is devastated to learn her newborn has died shortly after birth, but a short while later, she begins to suspect the baby has been abducted. Certain that there's only one way to find out the truth, Rachel returns to the hospital. Here she encounters the menacing Dennis Betts (Clive Russell), and in an attempt to flee from him, she ís forced to hide in a car belonging to Daniel Stone (Douglas Henshall), a hospital porter. Initially reluctant to help, Daniel's conscience eventually gets the better of him. Rachel's world is further rocked by the death of her best friend Annie (Stephanie Buttle), and the discovery that Dennis Betts is actually a policeman, with his own very personal reasons for pursuing Rachel. As Rachel and Daniel race through London's nightscape, desperate to stay one step ahead of Betts, every discovery unleashes further hell, extending way beyond the disappearance of Rachel's baby. Their only solid lead seems to be Joanne (Sarah Cattle), a young prostitute, whose own baby provides a link. But with Betts systematically eliminating anyone in his way, a further web of conspiracy unfolds and Rachel and Daniel are led to her old family doctor, Robert Barrum (Frank Finlay).

== Cast ==
- Emily Woof – Rachel Stewart
- Douglas Henshall – Daniel Stone
- Clive Russell – DS Dennis Betts
- Kevin Whately – Dr. Richard Herd
- Frank Finlay – Dr. Robert Barrum
- Craig Kelly – DC Robert Mosley
- Stephanie Buttle – Annie Cox
- Steve Sweeney – Jimmy Tibbs
- Roger Nott – Pat Towne
- Richard Lumsden – Tim Cox
- Tilly Vosburgh – Sarah Betts
- Sarah Cattle – Joanne Dreyer
- Tameka Empson – Hairdresser
