= Robert Woof (heritage administrator) =

English academic (1931–2005)

Dr Robert Woof OBE
- Born: Robert Samuel Woof; 20 April 1931; Lancaster, England
- Died: 7 November 2005 (aged 74); Newcastle upon Tyne, England
- Children: Emily Woof

Robert Samuel Woof CBE FRSL (20 April 1931 – 7 November 2005) was an English scholar, most famous for having been the first Director of the Wordsworth Trust, which looks after Dove Cottage and runs the tourist attraction now known as Wordsworth Grasmere in Grasmere, the Lake District, Cumbria. Dove Cottage is known as the centre for British Romanticism movement, having been the home of William Wordsworth from 1799 to 1808.

The actress Emily Woof is his daughter.

== Biography ==
He was born in Lancaster, England, the youngest of three children of William Woof, a farm manager, and his wife Annie Mason; his father was bailiff of Home Farm, part of the Royal Albert Institution, Lancaster. He attended Scotforth School and Lancaster Royal Grammar School and first visited Dove Cottage on a cycling tour in 1949. He attended Pembroke College, Oxford on a scholarship, graduating in 1953, and gained a doctorate (1958–61) with a Goldsmith Travelling Fellowship as a lecturer at University of Toronto; his PhD thesis was on "The Literary Relations of Wordsworth and Coleridge 1795–1803".

Woof was a Lord Adams of Ennerdale Fellow (1961–62), and Lecturer (1962–71) and Reader (1971–92) in English Literature at University of Newcastle upon Tyne, holding a Leverhulme Fellowship in 1983–84. He started working at Dove Cottage in 1974, where he was Honorary Keeper of collections of books, manuscripts and paintings (1974–89) and Honorary Secretary and Treasurer (1978–95). He was Director of the Wordsworth Trust and Wordsworth museum in 1989–2005. He was Vice-Chairman of the Drama Panel of the Arts Council (1982–88), including Acting chairman (1985–86); Vice-Chairman (1983–84) and Chairman (1984–88) of the Literature Panel; and Chairman of the English Touring Theatre (1993–2000).

Woof was made Commander of the Order of the British Empire in 1998 and Fellow of the Royal Society of Literature in 2000.

== Personal life ==
In 1958 he married Pamela Moore; they had two sons and two daughters. He died in Newcastle upon Tyne, England, in 2005.

== Books ==
- William Wordsworth: Critical Heritage (Critical Heritage S.), Routledge, an imprint of Taylor & Francis Books Ltd – 22 November 2001, ISBN 978-0-415-03441-8, Hardcover
- With Michael Broughton; William Clarke; John Murdoch; Joanna Selbourne; Greg Smith; The Spooner Collection of British Watercolours, Wordsworth Trust, Grasmere, 31 January 2006, ISBN 978-1-905256-03-7
- With Jean-Paul Martinon; Hamish Robinson; Daniel Sturgis; Rebecca O'Connor; Daniel Buren: At the Wordsworth Trust, Wordsworth Trust, Grasmere, September 2005, ISBN 978-1-905256-01-3
- Treasures of the Wordsworth Trust: Published to Celebrate the Opening of the Jerwood Centre at the Wordsworth Trust by Seamus Heaney, 2 June 2005, Wordsworth Trust, Grasmere, June 2005, ISBN 978-1-905256-00-6 (hardcover: ISBN 978-1-905256-04-4)
- With Daniel Sturgis; Matthew Collings; Kathy Kubickif; Abstract Logic, Wordsworth Trust, Grasmere, May 2005, ISBN 978-1-870787-99-4
- With Conrad Atkinson; Richard Cork; Henry Shukman; Common Sights, Wordsworth Trust, Grasmere, January 2005, ISBN 978-1-870787-89-5
- With Keith Coventry; Des Lawrence; Matthew Hollis; Joan Key; Kay Rosen; Lily van der Stokker; Daniel Sturgis; Between Letters and Abstraction, Wordsworth Trust, Grasmere, January 2005, ISBN 978-1-870787-97-0
- With Jack Mapanje; Simon Morley; An Elegy Wrote in an English Churchyard, Wordsworth Trust, Grasmere, January 2005, ISBN 978-1-870787-86-4
- With Christopher Bucklow; Marina Warner; Roger Malbert; Adam Phillips; If This Be Not I, Wordsworth Trust, Grasmere, June 2003, ISBN 978-1-870787-95-6
- Co-editor with Alice Oswald and Peter Oswald; Earth Has Not Any Thing to Shew More Fair: A Bicentennial Celebration of Wordsworth's Sonnet Composed upon Westminster Bridge, Shakespeare's Globe & The Wordsworth Trust, 2002, ISBN 978-1-870787-84-0
- English Poetry 850–1850: The first thousand years: with some romantic perspectives, Wordsworth Trust, Grasmere, 2000, ISBN 978-1-870787-70-3
- Romantic icons: The National Portrait Gallery at Dove Cottage, Grasmere, Wordsworth Trust, Grasmere, 1999, ISBN 978-1-870787-60-4
- With Stephen Hebron; Towards Tintern Abbey: Bicentenary of "Lyrical Ballads", 1798, The Wordsworth Trust, Grasmere, July 1998, ISBN 978-1-870787-55-0
- With Fay Godwin; A Perfect Republic of Shepherds, Wordsworth Trust, Grasmere, June 1997, ISBN 978-1-870787-30-7
- With Stephen Hebron; John Keats, Wordsworth Trust, Grasmere, 1995, ISBN 978-1-870787-15-4
- Shelley: An Ineffectual Angel?, Wordsworth Trust, Grasmere, December 1992, ISBN 978-1-870787-00-0
- Tennyson, 1809–1892: A Centenary Celebration, Tennyson Society, July 1992, ISBN 978-0-901958-30-3
- Artist as Evacuee: Royal College of Art in the Lake District 1940–1945, Wordsworth Trust, Grasmere, December 1987, ISBN 978-0-9510616-3-3
- With Jonathan Wordsworth; Michael C. Jaye; William Wordsworth and the Age of English Romanticism, Piscataway, New Jersey, US: Rutgers University Press, 1987, ISBN 978-0-8135-1274-7
- With John Murdoch; The Discovery of the Lake District: A Northern Arcadia and Its Uses, Faber & Faber, October 1986, ISBN 978-0-905209-96-8
- With David Thomason; Derwentwater – The Vale of Elysiums: An Eighteenth Century Story, Wordsworth Trust, Grasmere, December 1986, ISBN 978-0-9510616-2-6
- Thomas de Quincey: An English Opium Eater 1785–1859, Wordsworth Trust, Grasmere, December 1985, ISBN 978-0-9510616-0-2
- Wordsworth Circle: Studies of Twelve Members of Wordsworth's Circle of Friends, Trustees of Dove Cottage, Grasmere, July 1979, ISBN 978-0-9501238-4-4
