= Young Man with a Horn (film) =

1950 film by Michael Curtiz

- Theatrical release poster
- Directed by: Michael Curtiz
- Screenplay by: Carl Foreman; Edmund H. North
- Based on: Young Man with a Horn; 1938 novel by Dorothy Baker
- Produced by: Jerry Wald
- Starring: Kirk Douglas; Lauren Bacall; Doris Day; Hoagy Carmichael; Juano Hernández
- Cinematography: Ted D. McCord
- Edited by: Alan Crosland Jr.
- Music by: Ray Heindorf
- Distributed by: Warner Bros. Pictures
- Release date: March 1, 1950
- Running time: 112 minutes
- Country: United States
- Language: English
- Box office: $1.5 million

Young Man with a Horn is a 1950 American musical drama film starring Kirk Douglas, Lauren Bacall, Doris Day, Hoagy Carmichael, and Juano Hernandez. It was based on the 1938 novel of the same name by Dorothy Baker, inspired by the life of jazz cornetist Bix Beiderbecke. The film was directed by Michael Curtiz, produced by Jerry Wald, and its screenplay written by Carl Foreman and Edmund H. North.

== Plot ==
Rick Martin is a young Midwestern orphan cared for by an indifferent elder sister, living in his own isolated world. He is first drawn to an inner-city mission for alcoholics and its piano-accompanied hymns. Seeking a more portable instrument, his eye catches a trumpet in the window of a pawn shop. He works as a pin setter in a bowling alley to save up enough money to buy it.

Tutored by Black jazzman Art Hazzard, Rick grows into an outstanding, intuitive jazz musician. He lands a job playing for a large dance band, getting to know piano player Willy "Smoke" Willoughby and beautiful vocalist Jo Jordan. In spite of being ordered to stick to the song arrangements, Rick prefers to improvise. One night during a band break, he leads an impromptu jam session which gets him fired.

Rick and Smoke leave together, but go their separate ways. Some time later, Jo and Rick discover one another in New York City. Jo falls for Rick again, and finds him a job in New York with a dance orchestra. One night, her friend Amy North accompanies her to hear Rick play. A wealthy dilettante studying to be a psychiatrist, Amy is a complicated young woman still disturbed by her mother's suicide, which she blames on her father. Though Amy claims to be incapable of feeling love and warns Rick away, he persists in questing for her and begins to neglect his old friends. Jo, always concerned with Rick's welfare, tries to open his eyes to Amy and the harm she will do, only to be stunned when Rick tells her he and Amy are married.

Amy does not enjoy Rick's music and is not interested in his career, focusing on her own psychiatry studies. Rarely together because of their opposite schedules, they begin to quarrel; occasionally, Amy fails to return home at night. Badly rattled, Rick begins drinking. Art finds him in a bar and tries gently to offer advice and help. Overwrought with his problems, Rick takes his frustrations out on his visibly failing, soon to be unemployed, friend. In a fog after Rick's treatment, Art wanders out of the bar and straight into the path of a car. By the time Rick finds out and rushes to the hospital, Art is dead.

Returning home, Rick finds Amy torturing a piano concerto after failing her final exams for medical school. They immediately quarrel. The idea of trying school again is clearly less attractive to her than going to Paris with a new girlfriend to dabble at becoming a painter. She admits to Rick that she only married him because she hoped some of his grounding in his own talent would rub off on her. Amy once again acts like a cold fish towards Rick and rejects his attempts at comfort. The next night, Rick goes to Art's funeral instead of attending a cocktail party Amy throws. He arrives home just as guests are leaving; Amy is drunk and angry at him for embarrassing her by not showing up. They argue viciously, then she introduces him to her new girlfriend. Rick tells Amy she is sick and should see a doctor, and leaves her.

Unable to keep his fury pent up, and disgust at allowing himself to be stultified playing in a dance band, Rick immediately gets fired, then neglects even his own music. Broken, he descends deeper into the bottle. At a recording session with Smoke and Jo, he plays erratically and loses control of his instrument trying to reach a magic note he has dreamed of. He destroys his horn and drops out of sight, wandering around as a common rummy. One night he collapses in the street and a cab driver takes him to a sanitarium. He is diagnosed with pneumonia and is near death. When Smoke has him transferred to a hospital, Jo hurries to his side and Rick magically recovers his health, rediscovers his music, and falls in love with her.

== Cast ==
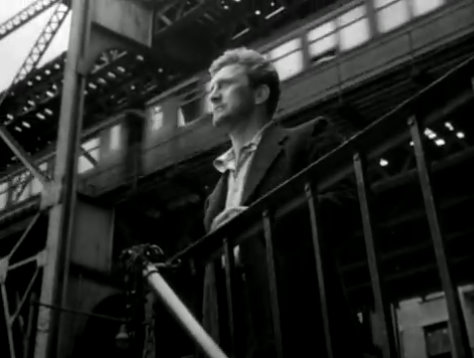
Kirk Douglas in Young Man With a Horn, New York City's Third Avenue El in the background

- Kirk Douglas as Rick Martin
- Lauren Bacall as Amy North
- Doris Day as Jo Jordan
- Hoagy Carmichael as Willie 'Smoke' Willoughby
- Juano Hernández as Art Hazzard
- Jerome Cowan as Phil Morrison
- Mary Beth Hughes as Marge Martin
- Nestor Paiva as Louis Galba
- Walter Reed as Jack Chandler

== Production ==
Composer-pianist Hoagy Carmichael, a friend of the real Bix Beiderbecke, added realism to the film as Rick's sidekick and gave Kirk Douglas an insight into playing the role. Famed Big Band trumpeter Harry James dubbed Douglas' playing in a Swing Era soloist's style.

In her authorized biography Doris Day described her work on the picture as “one of the few utterly joyless experiences I had in films. I was made to feel like an outsider, an intruder. Kirk and Betty Bacall had once gone together, and this picture brought them back together again, so I guess that had something to do with it. Kirk was civil to me and that’s about all. But then Kirk never makes much of an effort toward anyone else. He’s pretty much wrapped up in himself.

In the Baker novel, Amy is described as having lesbian tendencies; the film employs period Hollywood connotations and hints to circumvent the Motion Picture Production Code and strongly imply her bisexuality. For example, regarding Jo, Amy says: "It must be wonderful to wake up in the morning and know just which door you're going to walk through. She's so terribly normal." Later, Amy, who has already come to refusing Rick's physical advances, dismisses their future together by telling him she may leave for France with a new girlfriend to study art, whom she later shares an affectionate goodnight with in front of her already fuming husband.

Jean Spangler, an uncredited extra seen briefly as a hula dancer, disappeared shortly after her work in the film was completed, but well before it was released. The publicity surrounding her still-unsolved disappearance, the massive police search for any clues, and a brief note addressed to "Kirk" found in Spangler's purse, were all huge news at the time. Douglas denied any involvement with Spangler, beyond a brief interaction during her time on the film set, and was able to show police that on the night of Spangler's disappearance in Los Angeles (October 7, 1949), he was over 100 miles away in Palm Springs.

The tacked-on happy ending of the film was found neither in the novel nor in the life of Bix Beiderbecke, who died of alcoholism at 28.

== Reception ==
According to the contemporary The New York Times, "banalities of the script are quite effectively glossed over in the slick pictorial smoothness of Michael Curtiz's direction and the exciting quality of the score. The result is that there is considerable good entertainment in Young Man With a Horn despite the production's lack of balance."

In spite of the screenplay, the Times praised the performances of Douglas, Day, and Carmichael, but noted "the unseen star of the picture is Harry James, the old maestro himself, who supplies the tingling music, which flows wildly, searchingly, and forlornly from Rick Martin's beloved horn. This is an instance where the soundtrack is more than a complementary force. It is the very soul of the picture because if it were less provocative and compelling, the staleness of the drama could be stultifying."

== Radio adaptation ==
Young Man with a Horn was presented on Lux Radio Theatre March 3, 1952. Kirk Douglas recreated his role from the film. The one-hour adaptation also starred Jo Stafford and Patrice Wymore.

== Legacy ==
A 1956 episode of The Honeymooners was named after this film.

== See also ==
- List of American films of 1950
