= Douglas Henshall =

Scottish actor (born 1965)

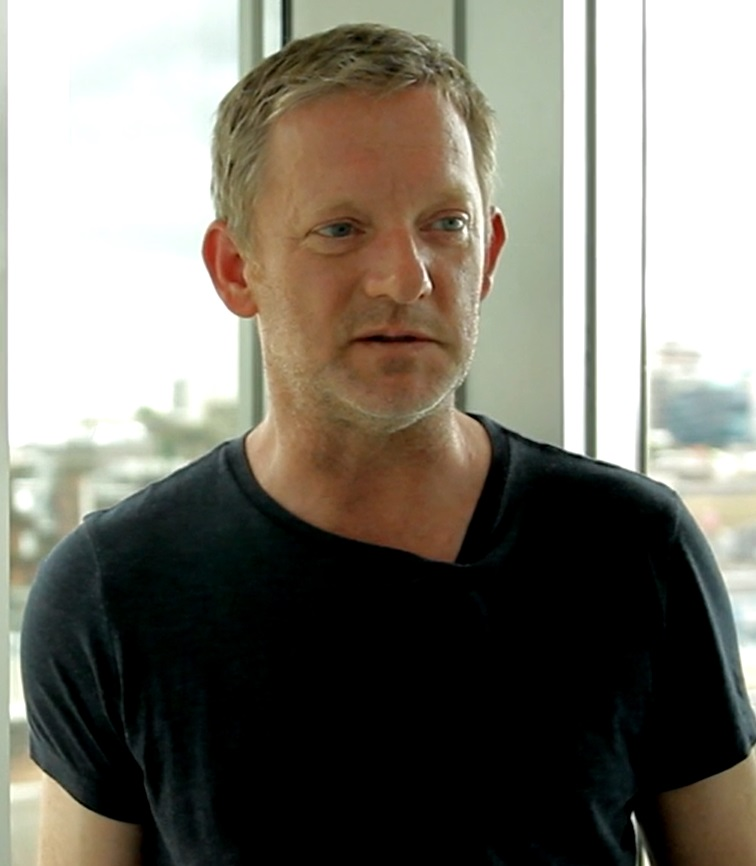
- Henshall in 2015
- Born: Douglas James Henshall; 19 November 1965 (age 60); Glasgow, Scotland
- Other names: Dougie Henshall; Doug Henshall
- Occupation: Actor
- Years active: 1989–present
- Height: 1.79m (5 ft 10 in)
- Spouse: Tena Štivičić (m. 2010)
- Children: 1

Douglas James Henshall (born 19 November 1965) is a Scottish actor. He is best known for his roles as Professor Nick Cutter in the science fiction series Primeval (2007–2011) and Detective Inspector Jimmy Pérez in the crime drama Shetland (2013–2025).

== Background ==
Henshall's mother was a nurse and his father a salesman. He attended Barrhead High School. While studying there, he joined the Scottish Youth Theatre. After graduation, he moved to London and trained at Mountview Academy of Theatre Arts. Henshall joined the 7:84 theatre company in Glasgow, and later returned to London where he received critical acclaim for his theatre work, notably Life of Stuff at the Donmar Warehouse (1993) and American Buffalo at the Young Vic (1997). He married his partner, Croatian writer Tena Štivičić, in Las Vegas in February 2010.

== Career ==
=== 1990s ===
In 1993, Henshall appeared in Dennis Potter's television adaptation of Lipstick on Your Collar. He also portrayed T. E. Lawrence in a recurring role in George Lucas's American television series Young Indiana Jones (1992–1996). In 1993 he appeared in series 10 of The Bill. One of his first successful film roles was as Edgar in Angels and Insects (1995) before going on to star in Sharpe's Justice (1997), Orphans (1998), The Man with Rain in His Shoes (1998). He has also starred in many television series and is known for his roles in Psychos (1999) This Year's Love (1999) and Kid in the Corner (1999) (for which he won a gold nymph as best actor in a mini-series at the Monte Carlo TV festival in 2000).

=== 2000s ===
Henshall appeared in the films Lawless Heart (2001) Gentlemen’s Relish (2001) and Silent Cry (2002). Roles on television include Konstantin Levin in Anna Karenina (2000), and Dan in Loving You (2003). He has also performed in plays for BBC Radio, including the role of Romeo in Romeo and Juliet (1999) and David in The Long Farewell (2002). In the summer of 2002, Henshall returned to the London stage where he performed the role of Michael Bakunin in Tom Stoppard's new trilogy of plays, The Coast of Utopia, at the National Theatre.

Henshall played Marcus in the post-production British comedy film French Film, alongside Hugh Bonneville and Anne-Marie Duff. He took the starring role as scientist Professor Nick Cutter in the first three series of the science fiction series Primeval from 2007 to 2009 and starred in Dorian Gray (2009) as the doctor Alan Campbell.

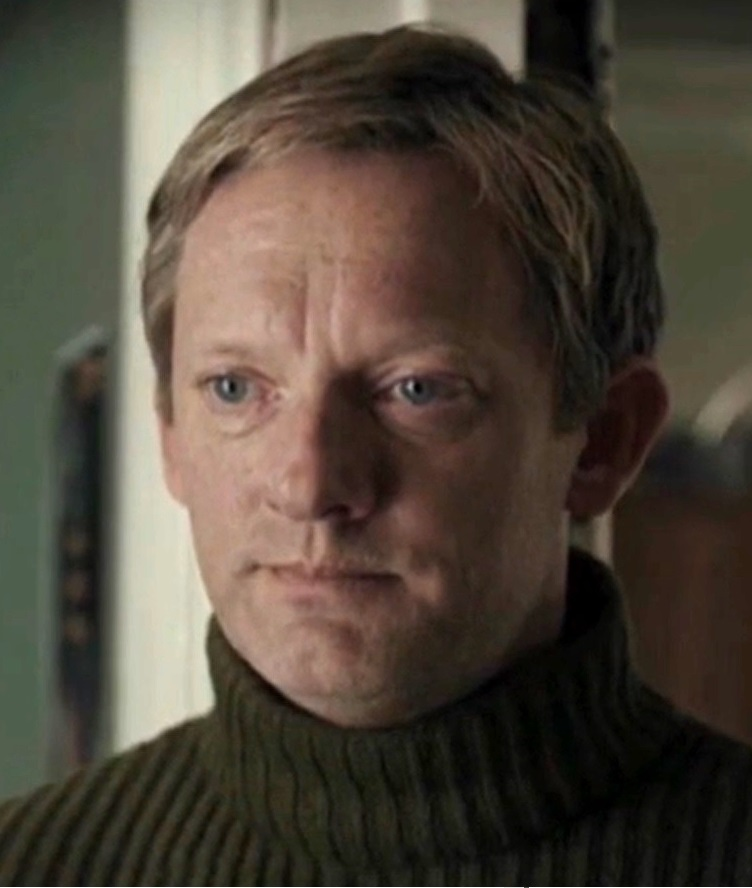
Henshall in Series 1 of Shetland in 2013

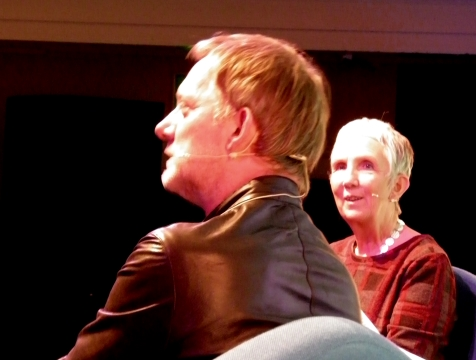
Douglas Henshall and author Ann Cleeves at the Bloody Scotland International Crime Writing Festival, 2017

=== 2010s ===
He went on to appear in another ITV1 show, Collision, in which he played the investigating officer of a multi-vehicle car crash. In 2010, Douglas starred in a BBC1 drama called The Silence. He appeared in series 5 of Lewis in the episode "The Mind Has Mountains" and as Cradoc in The Eagle (2011).

In summer 2011, Henshall starred in Harold Pinter's Betrayal at the Comedy Theatre in London's West End playing the lover of Emma, played by Kristin Scott Thomas. Her husband was played by Ben Miles and the revival was brought to life by director Ian Rickson. In autumn 2012, he appeared as Oliver Cromwell in the premiere of the new play 55 Days.

In 2012, he starred as Augustus Cribben in The Secret of Crickley Hall, and in the ITV television film of Ian Rankin's novel Doors Open.

In 2013, Henshall starred as Detective Inspector Jimmy Pérez in the BBC drama Shetland filmed in Lerwick and Glasgow. The story was based on Ann Cleeves' Shetland crime novel Red Bones. A second series of six episodes consisted of three two-part stories based on Cleeve's Raven Black, Dead Water and Blue Lightning. It screened in the UK in March and April 2014. A further series was filmed in 2015, screening on BBC1 in the UK during January and February 2016. Henshall won the Bafta Scotland best television actor award in 2016 for his work in the series and the show won the best television drama.

In 2015, Henshall starred as Taran MacQuarrie in the TV series Outlander.

In 2016, he starred in the Scottish three-part television drama series In Plain Sight as detective William Muncie, who pursued serial murderer Peter Manuel to his conviction and ultimate execution by hanging.

Henshall starred in the film Iona, written and directed by Scott Graham, which opened in March 2016. It is the story of a mother who burns her car and takes her teenage son on a ferry to the island she was named after. In 2019 he appeared as antiquarian book dealer Adam Snow in Susan Hill's ghost story The Small Hand (Channel 5 TV).

=== 2020s ===
Henshall left the series Shetland in June 2022 and acted in the series Who Is Erin Carter? shown on Netflix, in the series Murder is Easy on BBC, and in the series The Darkness.

== Filmography ==
Year	Film	Role	Notes
1989	The Bill	Manager	TV series (1 episode: "Grace of God")
1990	Taggart	Motor Cyclist	TV series (1 episode: "Love Knot")
1990	The Big Man	Davie Dawson	
1990	Silent Scream	News Reporter – 1963, Brixton, Soho	
1991	4 Play	Eric Shaw	TV series (1 episode: "Ball on the Slates")
1991	Jute City	Sammy Kerr	TV series (2 episodes)
1991	Boon	Johnny	TV series (1 episode: "The Night Before Christmas")
1992	Van der Valk	Joep Huizinga	TV series (1 episode: "The Ties that Bind")
1992	Underbelly	Haig	TV series (1 episode: "Episode #1.4")
1992	Firm Friends	Stephen	TV series (1 episode: "Episode #1.1")
1993	Lipstick on Your Collar	Corporal Berry	TV series (6 episodes)
1993	The Young Indiana Jones Chronicles	T. E. Lawrence	TV series (2 episodes)
1993	Screen One	Louie Gibbons	TV series (1 episode: "Down Among the Big Boys")
1994	The Bill	Stewart French	TV series (1 episode: "Darkness Before Dawn")
1994	Common as Muck	Brian Forget	TV series (3 episodes)
1994	Rab C. Nesbitt	Donny	TV series (1 episode: "More")
1994	Rose Red	Man	Short
1995	Ghosts	Billy	TV series (1 episode: "Three Miles Up")
1995	Angels & Insects	Edgar Alabaster	
1996	Screen Two	Clive Colville	TV series (1 episode: "Crossing the Floor")
1996	Thief Takers	Paul Valera	TV series (1 episode: "Nasty Boys")
1997	Sharpe's Justice	George Wickham	TV movie
1997	Kull the Conqueror	Ducalon	
1998	The Man With the Rain in His Shoes	Victor Bukowski	AKA Twice Upon a Yesterday
1998	Orphans	Michael	
1999	This Year's Love	Danny	
1999	Fast Food	Benny	
1999	Jack of Hearts	Stan Denby	TV series (6 episodes)
1999	Psychos	Dr. Daniel Nash	TV series (6 episodes)
1999	Kid in the Corner	Alex Letts	TV series
2000	Anna Karenina	Levin	TV series (4 episodes)
2001	Gentlemen's Relish	Cromwell Marsh	TV movie
2001	Lawless Heart	Tim	
2002	Silent Cry	Daniel Stone	
2003	It's All About Love	Michael	
2003	Loving You	Dan	TV movie
2003	Unscrew	Sam	Short
2004	Frances Tuesday	Lucas Pilgrim	TV movie
2005	Dalziel and Pascoe	Tony Watson (including a cameo as Fagin singing in Oliver!)	TV series (2 episodes) "Dust Thou Art"
2005	The Strange Case of Sherlock Holmes and Arthur Conan Doyle	Sir Arthur Conan Doyle	TV movie
2005	Ripley Under Ground	Derwatt	
2006	Free Jimmy	Eddie	Voice
2006	Dead Long Enough	Styx	
2007	Flying Lessons	Aarto	
2007	Sea of Souls	Robert Dunbar	TV series (2 episodes)
2007–2009	Primeval	Nick Cutter	(16 episodes: 2007–2009)
2008	French Film	Marcus	
2009	Primeval Evolved	Nick Cutter	Video Game
2009	Dorian Gray	Alan Campbell	
2009	Collision	DI John Tolin	TV series (5 episodes)
2010	The Silence	DCI Jim Edwards	TV mini-series (4 episodes)
2011	The Eagle	Cradoc	
2011	South Riding	Joe Astell	TV mini-series (3 episodes)
2011	Lewis	Alex Gansa	TV series (1 episode: "The Mind Has Mountains")
2011	How I Was Stolen by the Germans	Werner Kraus	
2012	The Kidnap Diaries	Sean Langan	TV movie
2012	Playhouse Presents	Harker	TV series (1 episode: "The Sniper")
2012	The Secret of Crickley Hall	Augustus Cribben	TV series (3 episodes)
2012	Doors Open	Mike Mackenzie	TV movie
2013–2022	Shetland	DI Jimmy Pérez	TV series, lead role (38 episodes)
2014	The Salvation	Sheriff Mallick	
2015	Outlander	Taran MacQuarrie	TV series (4 episodes)
2015	Iona	Daniel	
2015	Black Work	DCS Hepburn	TV series (3 episodes)
2016	In Plain Sight	Sergeant William Muncie	TV mini-series, lead role
2023	Murder is Easy	Major Horton	Two-part drama
2023	Who Is Erin Carter?	Daniel Lang	TV series
2025	The Revenge Club	Steve Williams	Main cast
2026	Angh	Missionary	
2026	Forever Home	Robert	Lead role
