= This Year's Love (film) =

- DVD Cover
- Directed by: David Kane
- Written by: David Kane
- Produced by: Michele Camarda; Simon Scotland
- Starring: Dougray Scott; Jennifer Ehle; Ian Hart; Sophie Okonedo; Douglas Henshall; Emily Woof; Catherine McCormack; Kathy Burke
- Cinematography: Robert Alazraki
- Edited by: Sean Barton
- Music by: Simon Boswell
- Distributed by: Entertainment Film Distributors
- Release date: 19 February 1999
- Running time: 108 minutes
- Country: United Kingdom
- Language: English
- Budget: $4 million-$5 million
- Box office: £3.6 million ($5.9 million) (UK)

This Year's Love is a 1999 film written and directed by David Kane and set in and around Camden Town in London.

== Cast ==
- Dougray Scott as Cameron
- Jennifer Ehle as Sophie
- Ian Hart as Liam
- Sophie Okonedo as Denise
- Douglas Henshall as Danny
- Emily Woof as Alice
- Catherine McCormack as Hannah
- Kathy Burke as Marey
- Jamie Foreman as Billy
- Bronagh Gallagher as Carol
- Eddie Marsan as Eddie
- Alastair Galbraith as Willie
- Reece Shearsmith as Tourist
- Richard Armitage as Smug Man at Party
- David Gray as Pub Singer
- Billy Mc Elhaney as Deaksie

== Production ==
The film was financed by Entertainment Film Distributors and the Scottish Arts Council.
