= Dorothy Baker (writer) =

American novelist (1907–1968)

- Born: Dorothy Alice Dodds; April 21, 1907; Missoula, Montana, US
- Died: June 17, 1968 (aged 61); Terra Bella, California, US
- Occupation: Writer
- Spouse: Howard Baker (m. 1930)
- Children: 2
- Writing career
- Notable works: Young Man with a Horn (1938); Trio (1943); Cassandra at the Wedding (1962)

Dorothy Baker (April 21, 1907 – June 17, 1968) was an American novelist who wrote the successful novels Young Man With a Horn and Cassandra at the Wedding. She also authored the controversial lesbian-themed novel Trio (1943) and its subsequent stage adaptation. During her long marriage to poet Howard Baker, she and her husband collaborated on several plays and screenplays.

== Early life and education ==
Baker was born Dorothy Alice Dodds on April 21, 1907, in Missoula, Montana to Raymond Branson Dodds and Alice Sowers Grady. Dorothy was raised in California, where her father worked in the oil business. As a child, she played the violin, but when her hand became physically disabled due to polio, she resigned herself to writing about music instead of playing it.

She studied at UCLA, transferred to Whittier College, then returned to UCLA, where she graduated in 1929 with a B.A. in French. She was a member of the sorority Gamma Phi Beta. Upon graduation, she traveled to France with her future husband, the poet Howard Baker, whom she had met at Whittier College. They married on August 22, 1930. The couple moved back to California, where Dorothy earned a B.E. degree at Occidental College and completed an M.A. in French from UCLA in 1933.

== Career ==
She and her husband moved to Berkeley when he obtained a teaching position at the University of California. She began teaching Latin at a private high school. After she sold her first short story, about a Latin teacher in California, and then followed it soon with a second published story, she decided to quit teaching and devote herself full-time to pursuing a writing career.

Baker's early short stories often incorporated one of her favorite topics, jazz. She once said, "Jazz music was one of the very few things I knew much about, and the only thing, except writing, that I had a consistent, long-term interest in". Jazz inspired her debut novel, Young Man with a Horn (1938), loosely based on the life of cornet player Bix Beiderbecke. Both the subject and title of the novel came from a 1936 New Republic essay by her friend and writing mentor Otis Ferguson. She was able to finish Young Man with a Horn with the aid of a $1,000 Houghton Mifflin Literary Fellowship that she was awarded in 1937 after submitting the initial hundred pages of the novel.

The character Amy North in Young Man with a Horn was Baker's first female character to be depicted with an ambiguous interest in women. It is unclear what Baker's opinions on lesbianism were. She did admit in a 1962 interview that she would have been "happier as a boy". Around the time that Young Man with a Horn was published, she revealed her lesbian inclinations in letters to her close friends, but she remained married to her husband, and it seems those inclinations were mostly set aside, except in her writing. In a 2013 retrospective on Baker, Emily Cooke observed that Baker's debut novel established a pattern in her fiction in which romantic relationships, especially when lesbian characters are involved, are doomed to fail. Young Man with a Horn was made into a 1950 film with Kirk Douglas, Lauren Bacall, Doris Day, and Hoagy Carmichael.

Baker's next novel, Trio, was published in 1943. During its composition, she was helped financially by winning a Guggenheim Fellowship for fiction in 1942. The story deals with "the rivalry between a sophisticated female French professor and an unsuspecting young man for the attention of a female graduate student." Although Trio was appreciated by some—for instance, the Commonwealth Club of California awarded it a gold medal for general literature, and The New York Times gave it a mostly laudatory review—the novel's lesbian relationship between Pauline Maury and Janet Logan drew condemnation for immorality. At the time, the dust cover of the novel stated, "TRIO has been highly praised by leading critics as a daring and forceful novel, and attacked with equal intensity for its frankness." She and Howard Baker adapted Trio into a play. It opened on Broadway in late 1944, but was quickly shut down on the grounds of obscenity.

After the suppression of the play, Baker went back to novel-writing with a poorly received work, Our Gifted Son (1948). In the next decade, she and her husband collaborated on various projects. In 1949, their comedic play Sparrow and the Characters was staged in Porterville, California. In 1956 they co-wrote a teleplay, The Ninth Day, which aired on the TV series Playhouse 90 in January 1957; it was a story about the regeneration of the human race after an H-bomb explosion.

In 1962, Baker once again enjoyed critical success with her novel Cassandra at the Wedding. While it also contained lesbian overtones, the subject was handled in a less judgmental way than she had done previously. According to Kelly Cannon of Muhlenberg College: "Where Trio presents lesbianism as overtly destructive—the lesbian 'villain' is disgraced and then commits suicide—in the later novel same-sex relations are simply part of the psychological puzzle from which the protagonist emerges as a stronger, more independent woman. In a redemptive image at the end of the novel, Cassandra walks across the Golden Gate Bridge with thoughts, not of suicide, but of life and art." Howard Baker claimed that the novel's twin sister characters, Cassandra and Judith, were based on Dorothy herself and the couple's daughters, Ellen and Joan. Cassandra at the Wedding garnered widespread praise, including the admiration of Carson McCullers and Alfred Kazin.

Later in life, Baker recalled that when she first began writing, she "was seriously hampered by an abject admiration for Ernest Hemingway, and I found that the only way to get over it was simply to quit writing any direct discourse. I didn't allow myself any quotation marks until I felt confident that I could write, for good or ill, my own stuff."

== Personal life and death ==
In the early 1940s, Baker relocated with her family from Cambridge, Massachusetts to a ranch in Terra Bella, California. In her remaining years, between writing projects, she contributed plays to local playhouses, raised her children, and ran a theater and a citrus farm.

On June 17, 1968, Dorothy Baker died of cancer at the age of 61 in Terra Bella.

== Bibliography ==
- Young Man with a Horn (1938)
- Trio (1943)
- Our Gifted Son (1948)
- The Ninth Day (1957) – co-written with Howard Baker
- Cassandra at the Wedding (1962)
