= Young Man with a Horn (novel) =

1938 novel by Dorothy Baker

- First edition cover
- Author: Dorothy Baker
- Language: English
- Subject: Jazz, Bix Beiderbecke
- Genre: Musical fiction
- Published: 1938 (Houghton Mifflin Company)
- Media type: Print (hardcover, paperback)
- Pages: 243
- OCLC: 1072104

Young Man with a Horn is a 1938 novel by Dorothy Baker. It is loosely based on the life of jazz cornet player Bix Beiderbecke. The story takes place during the formative years of jazz music. The extraordinarily gifted and obsessively driven trumpeter Rick Martin quickly rises to stardom, but his self-destructive tendencies result in his early demise. Young Man with a Horn was adapted into a successful 1950 film of the same title.

== Plot ==
The Prologue serves as a framing device that outlines the entire arc of the story. It is written as if the fictional Rick Martin was a real-life jazz performer: "Rick did what he could do so well that I, for one, won't be likely to ever hear his name without feeling my hair rise."

Book One opens with Rick as a child. He has a hardscrabble existence in a racially mixed, working-class neighborhood in Los Angeles. Although officially he lives with his aunt and uncle, as a practical matter he has almost no adult guidance and frequently skips school. Rick is white, and his closest boyhood friend, Smoke Jordan, is black.

In his mid-teens, Rick obtains a job setting up pins in a bowling alley. He has a passion for music and teaches himself piano, while also saving money to buy a "horn". Smoke works part-time as a janitor, and is an aspiring drummer. The two friends idolize a local Negro dance band, Jeff Williams and his Four Mutts. The piano-playing Williams mentors Rick and convinces him the trumpet is his true instrument. Williams arranges for his own trumpeter, Art Hazard, to give Rick lessons. Rick goes night after night to the Cotton Club in Vernon, listening to the various bands and memorizing their songs. He finally has a big break when white bandleader Lee Valentine is in L.A. on a cross-country tour. He is in need of a trumpeter. Williams recommends Rick, and Valentine is dazzled when he hears the young man play.

Rick joins Valentine's band and travels back with them to New York City. It is a time of speakeasies and big bands during the 1920s Jazz Age. Rick eventually signs with Phil Morrison's famous orchestra, playing "hot trumpet". Rick makes records, earns lots of money, but is also drinking to excess. He meets Amy North, a beautiful, sophisticated woman who encourages his worst impulses. She is portrayed as a sexually ambiguous character, although the novel only hints at her erotic tie to a female nightclub singer. After marrying Rick, Amy re-enrolls in medical school to train for psychiatry. When she grows bored with Rick and withdraws her affections, it contributes to his downfall.

Rick cannot enjoy the success he has achieved. He rebels against Morrison's notion of playing jazz in a conventional way, strictly as a means to material wealth. Rick quits the orchestra and is fired at the same moment. His frustrated drive for musical perfectibility, which fuels his drinking, ultimately destroys him. He dies, like Beiderbecke, at a young age.

== Background ==
Both the title and subject of the novel came from a 1936 New Republic essay about Bix Beiderbecke by Dorothy Baker's friend and writing mentor Otis Ferguson.

Young Man with a Horn was Baker's debut novel; she had previously sold short stories to magazines. She was able to finish writing the novel with the aid of a $1,000 Houghton Mifflin Literary Fellowship that she won in June 1937 after submitting the first 100 pages of her manuscript. In addition to the award money, she was promised publication of the novel upon its completion. At the time, she described her work-in-progress as a story about "the difficulty of retaining integrity in a world of swift acclaim and swift disgrace".

Baker once said, "Jazz music was one of the very few things I knew much about, and the only thing, except writing, that I had a consistent, long-term interest in". On the novel's dedication page, she noted: "The inspiration for the writing of this book has been the music, but not the life, of a great musician, Leon (Bix) Beiderbecke, who died in the year 1931."

== Reception ==
In The New York Times Book Review, Harold Strauss praised Baker's approach to telling the story: "Despite its subject matter, it is not the fragment of fevered impressionism that the jazz age used to produce; despite the irrationalism of swing, the book itself is a clear-minded, informed, coldly rational study of a swing addict." He added, however, that he "did not believe any of the episodes in which Amy [North] played a part. The book, still an unusual and striking piece of work, would have been much better without her." In the Detroit Free Press, Helen Bower wrote: "On practically all counts, Young Man with a Horn is a different book—very touching, very tender and understanding toward its thoroughly appealing and dedicated young hero."

Over the decades, Baker's novel came to be regarded as foundational to the genre of fiction about jazz. In a 1958 journal article, Professor Hugh L. Smith, Jr. said that Baker "opened the world of the jazz musician for the novelist. Its romantic theme—the struggle of the jazz musician to produce his art creatively in an alien, commercial world—was to become the norm."

In a 2005 retrospective, Jesse Kornbluth commended Baker for not condescending or sugar-coating the story, and for taking readers inside the music. He singled out the author's perceptive depiction of black-white relations in the early jazz years, and how Rick, despite his growing fame, has an inferiority complex in which he feels that black artists play the music "just a bit better than he ever will". This contributes to his chronic dissatisfaction, sleeplessness, and alcohol abuse. Kornbluth sees a clear echo here to Bix Beiderbecke's relation to Louis Armstrong.

== Editions ==
Young Man with a Horn has been reprinted many times in hardcover and paperback editions, as well as in German, French, Spanish, Italian, and Dutch translations.

== Adaptations ==
Michael Curtiz directed the 1950 film adaptation, with a screenplay by Carl Foreman and Edmund H. North. It starred Kirk Douglas as Rick Martin, and also featured Doris Day, Lauren Bacall, Juano Hernández, Jerome Cowan, and Beiderbecke's former friend and collaborator Hoagy Carmichael. The film has been released on DVD and Blu-ray.
