= Otis Ferguson =

American writer (1907–1943)

Otis Ferguson (August 14, 1907 – September 14, 1943) was an American writer best remembered for his music and film reviews in The New Republic in the 1930s.

Although he can be seen as a predecessor to film critics James Agee, Manny Farber, Pauline Kael, and Andrew Sarris, he has been characterized by Robert Christgau as "the first rock critic" due to his appreciation of jazz and its impact on popular culture. Ferguson died in action during World War II.

His film criticism is praised and discussed by critics Richard Schickel and Wesley Morris in the documentary film For the Love of Movies: The Story of American Film Criticism (2009).

On the release of The Wizard of Oz (1939) Ferguson wrote a notoriously negative review. In the review, he made the remark, "It has dwarfs, Technicolor, freak characters, and Judy Garland. It can't be expected to have a sense of humor as well."

After the attack on Pearl Harbor, Ferguson joined the Merchant Marine. He died in 1943, aged 36, when his ship was bombed while anchored in the Gulf of Salerno.

== Bibliography ==
- The Film Criticism of Otis Ferguson, edited by Robert Wilson, with a foreword by Andrew Sarris (Temple University Press, 1971) ISBN 0-87722-033-6
- In the Spirit of Jazz: The Otis Ferguson Reader, edited by Dorothy Chamberlain and Robert Wilson (December Press, 1982; Da Capo, 1997)
