= Doors Open =

2008 novel by crime writer Ian Rankin

- First edition
- Author: Ian Rankin
- Language: English
- Genre: Crime fiction
- Publisher: Orion Press
- Publication date: 2008
- Publication place: Scotland
- Pages: 272 pp
- ISBN: 0-7528-9070-0
- OCLC: 232712930

Doors Open is a 2008 novel by crime writer Ian Rankin. It was his first stand-alone thriller in over 10 years. The story was originally published as a serial in The New York Times Magazine.

== Plot outline ==
Mike Mackenzie is a software entrepreneur who has sold his company for a substantial amount of money, but is now bored and looking for a new thrill. His new-found wealth has funded a genuine interest in art so when his friend Professor Robert Gissing presents him with a plan for the perfect crime. With a vast collection but limited wall space, the National Gallery has many more valuable works of art in storage than it could ever display. The plan is to stage a heist at the Granton storage depot on "Doors Open Day" during which a selected group of paintings will be "stolen". The gang will then give the appearance of having panicked and fled without the works of art, but will have switched the real paintings with high quality forgeries good enough to convince anyone investigating the matter that no theft has been committed.

Intrigued, Mike willingly helps set that plan in motion. As they begin to it out, it becomes clear that they need some "professional assistance" and a chance encounter with Chib Calloway, a local gangster who Mike went to school with, fulfils that need.

== Reception ==
The novel was positively reviewed by Andrew Marr in The Guardian, praising its "light touch" and streamlined plot, saying: "What Rankin has done is to free himself from the detail and murk that a Rebus devotee would expect, and to plunge into pure, fast storytelling." Both The Guardian and The Times compared it to the work of John Buchan, and the Evening Standard described it as: "an amusing, bloody tale of middle-class amateurs mixing it with the big boys to pull off an audacious art heist." Kirkus Reviews declared it "not up to Rankin's best...but certainly entertaining" while Publishers Weekly praised the intricate plotting and the novel's "claustrophobic edge."

== TV adaptation ==
A television film of the book has been produced, starring Douglas Henshall as Mike Mackenzie, Ken Collard as Allan Cruickshank and Stephen Fry as Robert Gissing. Filming started in Edinburgh in April 2012, and the programme was aired on Boxing Day on ITV. The adaptation switches the location of the heist from the National Gallery to a Scottish bank.

== Related works ==
Rankin's 2002 short story collection Beggars Banquet includes a story "Herbert in Motion" (originally published 1996–1997). Its plot is also concerned with the theft of undisplayed works of art from the storage facilities of a major gallery by a curator, and their replacement with high quality forgeries to mask the crime.
