= List of Pobol y Cwm characters =

Characters of Pobol y Cwm

This is a list of characters/actors featured in the S4C/BBC soap opera Pobol y Cwm.

== Present characters ==
This includes characters who have been in the habit of returning after a long absence.

Character	Actor	Duration	Information
Megan Harries (née Owen)	Lisabeth Miles	1974–1996, 2002–2003, 2011–	The village's oldest (and longest-serving) character, Megan lives on her own after the deaths of her two husbands, Cliff and Reg, and is the proud owner of charity shop Apêl Maenan. Mother of Rhian and adoptive mother of Gareth. Once a regular, she is now a recurring character.
David 'Dai' Ashurst	Emyr Wyn	1978–1984, 2001–2020, 2022–	Former owner of APD; now retired. Husband of Diane, brother of Dic "Deryn" Ashurst and father of DJ. Formerly married to Sabrina Harries and Alice.
Ieuan Griffiths	Iestyn Jones	1988–1992, 1995–1997, 2000–2011, 2019–	Local councillor, and owner of Pwll Bach; the nearby landfill site. Former owner of Cwm FM, Cwmderi’s radio station. Father of Melanie and Lauren. Grandfather to Indeg. Ex-husband of Hazel. Previously had an affair with Lisa Morgan and Diane Ashurst. Formerly married to Anita until her death from dementia and works in APD.
Eileen Probert	Sera Cracroft	1989–1996, 1998, 2007–	Widow of Jon Markham and Jim Probert. Ex-wife to the late Denzil Rees. Runs Penrhewl farm and the organic food company Cae Glas. Mother of Sioned and Huwi-John and the late John and Angela, grandmother of Lili and Jac and the late Courtney.
Hywel Llywelyn	Andrew Teilo	1990–	Ex-husband of Stacey, Ffion, Gaynor and Sheryl. Father of Rhys, and the late Meilyr. Adoptive father of Esther; local councillor and DJ on village radio station Cwm FM.
Cassie Morris (née Nicholas)	Sue Roderick	1991–2004, 2018–	One of Cwmderi’s most colourful characters. Ex-wife of the late Teg and mother of Em and the late Steffan (who she was forced to kill in self-defence after he killed Teg). Co-landlady of the Deri with Kath.
Sioned Rees	Emily Adkins / Elan Evans / Emily Tucker (Present)	1993–1996, 2007–	Daughter to Eileen Markham and Denzil Rees. Half-sister of Angela and Huwi-John, and twin sister of the late John Rees. Mother of twins Lili and Jac. Great niece of Marian and distant cousin of Cadno. Married to Ed Charles from 2016–2017. Sentenced to six months imprisonment for spousal abuse in 2018. Was engaged to DJ but he jilted her and ran off with his ex-girlfriend Non. Runs the cafe/deli Tamed.
Kathleen 'Kath' Pearl Jones	Siw Hughes	1993–2007, 2014, 2017–	Jones family matriarch, mother of Mark and Stacey. Married to Brynmor. Co-landlady of the Deri with Cassie.
Mark Jones	Arwyn Davies	1993–	Cwmderi's postman and taxi driver. Son of Kath and Dyff and father of Debbie's son, Ricky.
Rhys Llywelyn	Aled Davies / Jack Quick (Present)	1997–2001, 2006–2015, 2018–	Son of Hywel and the late Nia Matthews and adoptive brother of Esther. Has a daughter called Gwen with Lois Evans whom he fathered when he was 14 and was given up for adoption. Previously owned the local gym, Chwys Rhys, and previously an estate agent with Tomos ac Ellis, now runs his own pub Y Ceffyl Du (The Black Horse).
Diane Ashurst (née Hopkins)	Victoria Plucknett (Present) / Eluned Jones	1998–2020, 2022–	Wife of Dai, local council mother of Jason and adopted mother to her niece Emma. Ex-wife of Reg Harries and Graham Francis. Former barmaid and co-owner of APD before retiring, now serves on the council.
Indeg Griffiths	Nia Brown / Shauna Rae Pick / Jemima Nicholas (Present)	2000–2001, 2010–2011, 2025–	Granddaughter of Ieuan Griffiths, daughter of Melanie Griffiths. Beautician. Friend of Siwsi and Lleucu, girlfriend of Ows.
Britt Evans (née Monk)	Donna Edwards	2002–	Sister of the late Brandon and half-sister to Garry Monk. Former partner of Teg, divorced from Siôn White. Mother of Chester, Catrin and Aaron. Previously ran the chippy and owned Y Deri with Garry, now in charge of the fried chicken shop MFC. Now married to Colin. Suffers from Bipolar Disorder.
Iolo Davies-White	Carwyn Rhys Hall / Llyr Thomas / Dyfan Rees (Present)	2002–2005, 2007, 2009–	Son of Sion and Gwen, brother to Macs and Huw, widow of Tyler. Adoptive father of Greta. Suffers from OCD. Local plumber. Separated from Tyler after discovering he had an affair with one of his pupils, Aled Richards.
Siôn White	Jeremi Cockram	2002–	Father of Iolo, Macs and Huw, ex-husband of Britt and Dr Gwen White (who died of cancer in 2003). Lives in Y Felin and works as a Welsh translator. Previously in a relationship with Anita.
Kelly Evans	Lauren Phillips	2003–2005, 2007, 2009, 2015–	Plain-speaking Kelly comes from the Gurnos estate in the South Wales Valleys. Niece of Anita Pierce, previously owned Caffe Meic and was a journalist for the Western Post. Had an eating disorder. Widow of Ed Charles. Mother to Paul, who was put up for adoption shortly after being born. Married to Jason and then divorced.
Huw "Jinx" Jenkins	Mark Flanagan	2005–2015, 2021–	Formerly DJ at Cwm FM, owner of the local pizza place. Previously engaged to Ffion Roberts and also dated Izzy Evans, Kelly Evans and Dani Thomas. Currently runs the village pizza place.
Dani Thomas	Elin Harries	2007–	Beautician, previous owner of Y Deri and Dan Y Seren. Ex-wife of Mark Jones, half-sister of Gethin Thomas and to Tyler and Liv Davies, aunt to Daniel and Greta, previously married to Garry Monk (now divorced), mother of the late Seren (initially Carol) and Gabriel. Works as a cleaner.
Colin Evans	Jonathan Nefydd	2008–	Often a comedy figure as a result of his unwise decisions and disappointing love life, ex-husband of Gaynor, father of Izzy and Lois, and brother of Yvonne. Now married to Britt. Manager of local shop.
Lleucu Rossiter	Alaw Grug Davies / Efa Grug (Present)	2008–2009, 2022, 2024–	Daughter of Cai Rossiter and Nesta Roberts, niece of Ffion Llywelyn.
Gwern Jones	Elis Lloyd Hughes / Keogh Kiernan (Present)	2010–	Son of Gwyneth Jones and Garry Monk. Currently living with Dani Thomas.
Esther Llywelyn	Eira Adoh / Rosie Ekenna (Present)	2016–	Adoptive daughter of Hywel and the late Sheryl.
Mathew Price	Mark Stuart Roberts	2016–	Second cousin of Eifion. Formerly shared a flat with Rhys. Currently in a relationship with Sioned. Dated Tesni and Izzy previously. Subject to an acid attack in early 2020. Current owner of APD.
Huwi-John Probert	Wil Owen / Evan Salter (Present)	2018–	Toddler son of Eileen and the late Jim, half-brother of Sioned and uncle to Lili and Jac.
Howard Owen	Endaf Eynon Davies	2018–2019, 2021–	Farmhand at Deri Fawr. Recently released from jail after organising illegal dog fights. Works at APD.

== Past characters ==
Character	Actor	Character duration
Richard "Dic" Ashurst	Ifan Huw Dafydd	1982–1993, 1995, 1999
Richard 'DJ' Ashurst	Carwyn Glyn	2014–2026
Mansel Bennett	Brinley Jenkins	1991, 1993
Doreen Bevan	Marion Fenner	1982–1996, 1999–2003
Stan Bevan	Phylip Hughes	1984–1994
Sylvia Bevan	Sharon Morgan	1984–1987
John Wyndham-Bowen	Dafydd Aeron	1985–1988
Tristan Bowen	Griff Williams	1990–1991
Cyrnol Buckley	Meredith Edwards	1978
Sharon Burgess	Sian Naiomi	1993–1996
Nerys Cadwaladr	Gaynor Morgan Rees	1974–1976, 1979–1980, 1982–1986, 1988–1991
Andrew Charles	Huw Davies	2011–2012, 2014
Ed Charles	Geraint Todd	2011–2019
Gemma Charles	Catrin-Mai Huw	2011–2016
Debbie Collins	Maria Pride	2005–2006, 2008–2020
Dolores "Dol" Collins	Lynn Hunter	2015–2017, 2019
Liam Collins	Sion Ifan Williams	2005–2008, 2014, 2016–2017, 2019
Vicky Collins	Seren Jones / Mali Ann Rees / Carli De'La Hughes	2005–2006, 2011, 2015–2019, 2021
Maya Cooper	Sophie Mensah	2023–2026
Ken Coslett	Phyl Harries	1988–1991
Linda Coslett	Delyth Wyn	1988–1991
Metron Coslett	Anwen Williams	1980–1982
Sandra Coslett	Buddug Morgan	1989–1990
Elen Cullen	Nia Medi	1990, 1993–1994
Jac Daniels	Dafydd Hywel	1976–1984, 1999, 2004
Robert Daniels	Dafydd Rees / Gruffudd Ifan	1983–1984, 1999, 2001–2003, 2007
Angie Davies	Catherine Ayers	1999–2001
Bella Davies	Rachel Thomas	1974–1992
Bethan Davies	Catrin Brooks	1999–2002
Iori Davies	Hugh Thomas	1991, 1993, 1995, 1997–1999, 2002, 2018–2021, 2025
Liv Davies	Catherine Burns	2009, 2017–2018, 2025–2026
Siwsi Davies	Lily Beau	2025–2026
Tyler Davies	Aled Llyr Thomas	2009, 2016–2023
Dylan Ellis	Gareth Jewell	2019–2023
Jacob Ellis	Dillwyn Owen	1974–1993
Lois Evans	Mirain Jones / Ceri Lloyd	2008–2014, 2021–2022, 2026
Meira Ellis	Sara McGaughey	1988–1994
Eleri Evans	Hazel Wyn Williams	1989–1991
Esyllt 'Izzy' Evans	Caryl Morgan	2008–2010, 2012, 2019–2021
Menna Evans	Sara Harries Davies	1995–1996, 2001
Sam Evans	Paul Gwyn Morris	2016–2017
Yvonne Evans	Tonya Smith	2009–2012, 2024
Delyth Fielding	Carys Eleri	2010–2012, 2021–2024
Nuala Flynn	Bethan Jones	1980, 1982
Pat Flynn	Iestyn Garlick	1980
Sean Flynn	Glyn Pensarn	1980–1981
Emma Francis	Catrin Arwel	1998–2005
Hannah Francis	Abi Smith / Megan Huws / Ella Peel	2000–2006, 2008, 2017–2018
Ifan Francis	Ioan Arnold	2017–2025
Jason Francis	Rhys ap Hywel	1998–2007, 2015–2026
Chris Frost	Llew Davies	2005–2007
Nansi Furlong	Marged Esli	1977, 1980–1989, 2010–2012, 2014–2016
Gwyneth Gregory	Nicola Beddoe	1988
Anita Griffiths	Nia Caron	1999–2026
Beti Griffiths	Margaret Williams	1981–1986
Cathryn Griffiths	Mari Emlyn	1981–1982
Colin Griffiths	David Lyn	1975–1976, 1981–1982
Annest Griffiths	Dilys Price	1975–1976
Hazel Griffiths	Jennifer Lewis	1996–2002, 2007–2008
Iolo Griffiths	Terry Dyddgen-Jones	1975–1976
Lauren Griffiths	Elan Isaac	1996–1997, 2000–2002
Melanie Griffiths	Heledd Owen / Elese Ward / Elin Jones / Rebecca May / Sioned Saunders	1990, 1992, 1995–1996, 1999–2001, 2010, 2026
Dan Gruffudd	Daniel Broderick	2015–2019
Carol Gwyther	Rhian Morgan	1984–1992
Herbert Gwyther	Alwyn Jones	1977–1988
Sandra Gwyther	Sian Meredydd	1982–1984, 1988, 1992
Beti Harries	Buddyg Williams	1974–1975
Dil Harries	Haydn Edwards	1974–1991
Gareth Harries	Jonathan Morgan / Ioan Gruffudd / Rhodri Wyn Miles	1975–1993, 1995–1997, 2000, 2002–2003
Reg Harries	Huw Ceredig	1974–2003
Rhian Harries	Rhian Samuel / Gemma Rachel Jones / Catherine Jones / Debbie Jones	1979–1995, 1997–2004, 2007
Sabrina Harries	Gillian Elisa	1974–1984, 1987–1988, 1999–2010, 2024
Wayne Harries	Dewi "Pws" Morris	1974–1987
Jordan Hill	Robert Marrable	1999–2000
Paul Hill	Ali Yassine	1999–2000
Terry Hopkins	Huw Emlyn	1991, 1993–1994, 1998–2000
Darren Howarth	Huw Euron	1998–2009, 2013–2015, 2018, 2024, 2026
Katie Howarth	Elin Llwyd	2006–2009, 2014
Julie Hughes	Grug Maria / Ruth Lloyd	2002–2007, 2015–2016, 2018
Luned Hughes	Rhianna Loren	2019–2021
Sheryl Hughes	Lisa Victoria	2001–2018, 2024, 2026
Huw Humphries	Dyfan Roberts	1999–2000
Steffan Humphries	Huw Garmon	1997–2004
Tom Humphries	Rhys ap Trefor	2024–2025
Cliff James	Clive Roberts	1974–1979
Glyn James	Ieuan Rhys	1983–1996
Gwenllian James	Megan Soffia Evans	1989–1994
Andrea Jenkins	Siwan Morris	2021–2022
Delme Jenkins	Geraint Eckley / Gwyn Vaughan	1993–1994, 1996, 2001–2002
Dora Jenkins	Olive Michael	1984–1997
Gareth Jenkins	Iwan Tudor	2000–2001, 2003
Lowri Jenkins	Meleri Bryn	1996, 1999–2002
Rita Jenkins	Olwen Medi / Rhoswen Deiniol	1975–1976, 1985–1993
Tal Jenkins	Ernest Evans	1975–1997
Derek Jones	Hywel Emrys	1987–2006, 2009, 2012, 2026
Dyff Jones	Dewi Rhys	1993–2000, 2024
Gwyneth Jones	Llinor ap Gwynedd	2003–2020, 2022–2023
Llio Jones	Miriam Isaac	2020–2021
Ricky Jones	Evan Rhys Coxley / Tomos West	2005–2019, 2022
Sian Jones	Sharon Morgan	1978
Stacey Jones	Shelley Rees	1993–2007, 2014, 2016–2017, 2024
Gladys Lake	Iona Banks	1976–1989, 1991
Idwal Lake	Stan Hughes	1986, 1989
Jinnie Lake	Catrin Dafydd	1986
Jane Leonard	Nia Caron	1990–1991
Colin Lewis	Dyfed Thomas	1989–1990
Eddie Lewis	Alun Elidyr / Meic Povey	1987, 1991–1994, 1996–1997, 2000
Gwyn Lewis	Emyr Bell	2002, 2006–2007
Hywel Lewis	Glyn Nicholas	1977
Laura Lewis	Beryl Williams	1977
Scott Lewis	Alex Harries	2009–2012
Beth Leyshon	Eirlys Britton	1977–1994
Clare Leyshon	Margaret John	1977–1978
Gwyn Leyshon	Gareth Bebb	1977–1978
Viv Leyshon	Geraint David	1977–1978
Gaynor Llywelyn	Sharon Roberts	2007–2026
Cilla Lloyd	Karen Elli	1997–1998, 2000–2001
Jon Markham	Steffan Rhodri	1995–1996, 1998
Bleddyn Matthews	Dewi Rhys Williams	1996–1997, 2000–2004, 2026
Llew Matthews	Rhys Parry Jones	1988–2001
Nia Matthews	Meleri Evans	1993, 1996–1999
Charles McGurk	Mei Jones	1997
Jean McGurk	Iola Gregory	1987–1997, 1999, 2002
Kirstie McGurk	Catherine Tregenna	1988–1990, 1993, 1996–1997
Sean McGurk	Gwyn Derfel	1991–1993, 1996
Bethan "Non" Mererid	Gwawr Loader	2017–2018, 2021
Fiona Metcalfe	Lydia Lloyd Parry	1992–1999
Jamie Metcalfe	Rhys Bleddyn	1994
Laura Metcalfe	Christine Pritchard	1994, 1996, 1999
Oliver Metcalfe	Geoffrey Morgan	1994–1995
Aaron Monk	Osian Morgan	2006–2022, 2024
Brandon Monk	Nic McGaughey	2002–2011
Chester Monk	Iestyn Cai Evans / James Wilbraham	2002–2019, 2024
Catrin Monk	Emily John	2003–2019, 2024
Seren Monk	Florence Seaman	2017–2024
Gill Morgan	Mair Rowlands	1996–1998
Lisa Morgan	Beth Robert	1990–1991, 1996–2000, 2019–2021
Owen Morgan	Ioan Evans	2004–2006
Tony Morgan	Danny Grehan	1994–1996
Morgan Morgans	Rhys Devlin	1978–1979
Alun Morris	Dorien Thomas	1982–1984
Cadi Morris	Betsan Jones	1974–1976
Daniel Morris	Luke Humphrey/Sion Emyr	1994–1997, 1999, 2002, 2024
Em Morris	Jessica Matthews / Lydia Unsworth / Mirain Evans	1999–2004, 2020
Glan Morris	Cadfan Roberts	1989–1996
Teg Morris	Yoland Williams	1991–2004
Tegwen Morris	Mabli Gwynne	2022, 2024
Beryl Nicholas	Iris Jones	1997–2004
Alison Owen	Manon Prysor	2000–2002
Elin Owen	Alexandra Roach	2001–2002, 2004–2005
Ceinwen Owen	Nesta Harris	1977–1978, 1981–1982, 1984–1989
Rob Owen	Rolant Prys	2000–2002
Brenda Parri	Sharon Morgan	2018–2021
Gerwyn Parri	Aled Pugh	2018–2022
Guto Parri	Owain Huw	2018–2022
Harri Parri	Charles Williams	1974–1989
Jaclyn Parri	Mali Harries	2018–2022
Tesni Parri	Lois Meleri-Jones	2018–2023
Alex Parry	Ian Saynor	1994, 1997, 2000
Karen Parry	Rhian Jones	1992–2003
Olwen Parry	Toni Carroll	1991–1997, 2000
Wiliam Parry	Aled Bidder	2014–2016
Rod Phillips	Geraint Owen	1991–1996, 1998–1999
Meic Pierce	Gareth Lewis	1975–1994, 1999–2015, 2024, 2026
John Powell	Dennis Birch	1987–1989
Kevin Powell	Iwan "Iwcs" Roberts	1988, 2007–2016, 2018
Meinir Powell	Ruth Lloyd	1997–1998
Alan Price	Meredudd Jones	2000–2001
Rachel Price	Judith Humphreys	1995–1998
Ray Price	Richard Elfyn	2021
Tom Price	Eric Wyn	1996–1997
Arwel Pritchard	Gwyn Parry	1989, 1996
Elgan Pritchard	Bryn Fôn	2017–2018
Nellie Pritchard	Beti Jones	1980
Adrian Probert	Roy Noble	2017, 2020
Angela Probert	Tara Bethan	2011–2016, 2018–2019
Courtney Probert	Katie Duffin	2011–2016
Jim Probert	Alun ap Brinley	2011–2020
Barry-John Probert	Aled Rhydian Lloyd / Geraint Morgan	1982–1993
Kevin Probert	Wyn Bowen Harries	1982–1986
Gwyn Prosser	Eryl Huw Phillips	1989–1991
Ted Prosser	Stewart Jones	1990–1991
Gareth Protheroe	Edward Thomas	1986–1990
Denzil Rees	Gwyn Elfyn	1984–2012
Marian Rees	Buddyg Williams	1999–2016
Ann Rhys	Nia Ceidiog	1983–1984
Aled Richards	Jacob Oakley	2019–2023
Cadno Richards	Catrin Powell	2007–2018
Dwayne Richards	Daryl Shute / Paul Morgans	2000, 2004–2009
Mandy Roberts	Eiry Thomas	1996–1997
Norman Roberts	Glyn Pritchard	1991–1992, 2011–2012
Nesta Roberts	Catrin Mara	2005–2010, 2012
Dewi Roderick	William Thomas	1975–1977, 1980–1984
Cai Rossiter	Rhys ap William	1996–1997, 2002–2005, 2007–2012, 2021–2026
Eifion Rowlands	Arwel Davies	2007–2022
Rhydian Samuel	Aneirin Hughes	1991–1993
Ivor Seymore	Elwyn Williams	1983–1988
Josh Smith	John Ogwen	2017–2019
Agnes Spotelli	Sian Owen	1978–1982
Ron Steadman	Wayne Cater	1996–1997, 2006
Geraint Stephens	Phil Reid	1997–1998, 2000–2002
Edgar Sutton	Gari Williams	1979–1985
Cheryl Thomas	Rebecca Trehearn	2023–2024
Gethin Thomas	Simon Watts	2010–2018
Daniel Thomas	Luke Alexander	2015–2017
Sara Thomas	Helen Rosser Davies	1998, 2000–2008, 2015–2021, 2024
David Tushingham	Islwyn Morris	1974–1996, 1999–2002
Maggie Tushingham	Harriet Lewis	1974–1996
Billy Unsworth	John Biggins	1990, 1996
Marlene Unsworth	Ella Hood	1990
Ron Unsworth	Bernard Latham	1989–1994, 1996, 1999, 2001
Gina Walters	Catrin Fychan	1991–1998
Maureen Walters	Rebecca Harries	1996–1999, 2012
Neville Walters	Aled Rhys Jones	1986–1988
Clem Watkins	Glan Davies	1988–1997
Arwen White	Nel Hannah	2012–2026
David White	Ian Staples	2003–2005, 2024
Gwen White	Betsan Llwyd	2002–2003
Huw White	Rhys Hartley	2002–2014
Leighton White	Alan H. Lloyd	2006–2009, 2011
Macs White	Iwan Rheon / Rhys Bidder	2002–2004, 2008–2013, 2017
Brian Wilcox	Ioan Hefin	1996–1997
Delyth Wilcox	Nia Samuel	1996–1997
Kylie Williams	Yasmin Winkley	2024–2025
Rhiannon Williams	Heledd Owen	2002–2003, 2007
Owain "Ows" Wilson	Dominic Francis	2004, 2026
Gwen Llywelyn	Tomos Parsons	2011, 2022
