= Gwaith/Cartref =

- Genre: Drama
- Directed by: Daf Palfrey; Andy Newbery; Hefin Rees
- Country of origin: United Kingdom
- Original language: Welsh
- No. of seasons: 9
- No. of episodes: 90

Production
- Producers: Sophie Fante; Nora Ostler
- Editors: Mike Hopkins; Rhys Ap Rhobert
- Running time: 60x 60mins (inc. adverts); 30x 24mins (inc. adverts)
- Production company: Fiction Factory

Original release
- Network: S4C
- Release: 18 September 2011 – 12 April 2018

Gwaith/Cartref (English: Home/Work) is a Welsh language television series that in set in the comprehensive school of Bro Taf, broadcast on S4C. The show was set in the Welsh valley Rhondda Cynon Taf from series one until the end of series five, and Rhymney Valley from the beginning of series six until the end of the show in series nine. The first episode was broadcast on S4C on 18 September 2011 and the final episode on 12 April 2018. Gwaith/Cartref ran for 90 episodes and almost 7 years. In 2019, the first three series were made available on S4C Clic.

It was the third new drama series to appear on S4C for 2011, next to Alys and Porthpenwaig. It follows the professional and personal lives of a group of teachers working at a Welsh language comprehensive school, dealing with a number of issues during and after the school day. The first half of each episode centres on the work-side, the second half on the home-side of the storyline. Actress Rhian Blythe won a BAFTA Cymru Best Actress award for her role in the 2014 series of the show. Siw Hughes was nominated for the same award.

Series 6, featuring mostly all new characters at a new school, started broadcast on 20 January 2016, with Series 7, directly continuing the story, starting on 7 September 2016. Series 8 was broadcast from 11 January 2017 to March 2017. Series 9 is broadcast from February to April 2018, returning to the show's original runtime of hour-long episodes after several series of half-hour episodes.

== Cast ==
=== Teachers ===
- Grug Matthews - Maths teacher (played by Rhian Blythe) (series 1-5)
- Beca Matthews - PE teacher (played by Hannah Daniel) (series 1-5)
- Wyn Rowlands - Welsh and Media Studies (played by Richard Elis) (series 1-5)
- Rhydian Elis – Headmaster (played by Rhodri Evan) (series 1-2)
- Gemma Haddon – School Secretary (played by Siw Hughes) (series 1-5)
- Gwen Lloyd – Geography teacher, later Head of Religious Education (played by Rhian Morgan) (series 1-5)
- Sara Harries - Art teacher (played Lauren Phillips) (series 1-3)
- Dan James - Geography teacher (played by Huw Rhys) (series 1-3)
- Simon Watkins - Geography teacher (played by Rhys ap Trefor) (series 1-3, guest series 6)
- Nerys Edwards - Drama/Media Studies (played by Catrin Fychan) (series 1-2)
- Aneurin Rees - Student maths teacher (played by Arwyn Jones) (series 1)
- Emyr Tomos - Welsh teacher (played by Lee Haven Jones) (series 1)
- Steffan Young - Head of Geography (played by Geraint Todd) (series 2)
- Brynmor Davies - Temporary, later permanent, Maths teacher (played by Bryn Fon) (series 2-5)
- Sian Bowen-Harries - Deputy Head at Ysgol Bro Tâf, Headmistress at Ysgol Llwyn Dafydd (played by Janet Aethwy) (regular series 2-5, guest series 6)
- Llinos Preece - Science teacher (played by Elin Phillips) (series 3)
- Aled Jenkins - Welsh teacher (played by Gareth Jewell) (series 3-9)
- Heuls - Owner of 'Crwban' and sister to Aled Jenkins (played by Elin Llwyd) (series 3-5)
- Miss Perkins - School Secretary (played by Andrea Edwards) (series 3-5)
- Lisa Morris - French teacher and Head of Pastoral Care at Ysgol Llwyn Dafydd (played by Ffion Williams) (series 3-5)
- Zara Dudek - Dinner lady at Ysgol Llwyn Dafydd (played by Carys Eleri) (series 3-5)
- Mr Hassan - Mosque manager (played by Ike Khan) (series 3)
- Dewi Pritchard - History teacher (played by Aled Pugh) (series 4-5)
- Dr Stephanie Murphy - Headteacher (played by Siwan Morris) (series 6-9)
- Eurig Bell - Deputy Head (played by Ieuan Rhys) (series 6-9)
- Llywela Harding - Welsh teacher (played by Sue Roderick) (series 6-9)
- Math Roberts - Maths teacher, later also Head of Sixth Form (series 6-9)
- Annest Haf - Drama teacher (played by Lowri Palfrey) (series 6-9)
- Ceri Gravelle - Biology teacher (played by Lisa Jen Brown) (series 6-9)
- Mei Huws - School caretaker (played by Bradley Freegard) (series 6-9)
- Donna Isaacs - School secretary (played by Shelley Rees) (series 6-9)
- Colin Isaacs - Chemistry teacher (played by Jâms Thomas) (series 6-9)
- Cadi Griffiths - Supply teacher (played by Lucy Hannah) (series 7)
- Gwenno Bell - School councillor (played by Mair Rowlands) (series 7-8)
- Gwyn Wilde - Drama and Welsh teacher (played by Morgan Hopkins) (series 9)
- Beth Wilde - Head of Biology (played by Rhian Jones) (series 9)

=== Students ===
- Nadine Smith - Bro Tâf Pupil. Year 9 (played by Manon Grocott) (series 1)
- Afan Rheeds - Bro Tâf Pupil. Year 6 (played by Stuart Happee Thompson) (series 1)
- Jac Lewis - Bro Tâf Pupil. Year 10 (played by Sam Davies) (series 1)
- Ben Dover - Bro Tâf Pupil. Year 7 (played by William Ragget) (series 2)
- Dylan Isaacs - Porth y Glo student (played by Jacob Oakley) (series 6-9)
- Gwydion Prydderch - Porth y Glo student (played by Ieuan Bradley) (series 6-9)
- Macsen Isaacs - (previously known as Phoebe Issacs) Porth y Glo student (played by Mabli Jen Eustace) (series 6-9)
- Nicky McLeod - Porth y Glo student (played by Saran Morgan) (series 7-9)
- Bleddyn Wilde - Porth y Glo student (played by Bedwyr Hedd Bowen) (series 9)
- Jack Dowling - Sloth (played by a nameless sloth)

== Broadcast ==
Gwaith/Cartref is broadcast on Welsh-language channel S4C with English subtitles. It began airing on 18 September 2011 in the new Sunday night drama timeslot of 9.00pm, like previous new series Alys and Porthpenwaig. The show was also broadcast on freeview-only HD channel S4C Clirlun (clear picture). Episodes can also be followed on S4C online service "Clic" and are available for up to 35 days before expiration.

== Ratings ==
| Episode | Airdates | | Total Viewers | Rank |
| Episode | First run | Repeats | Total Viewers | Rank |
|---|---|---|---|---|
| 1.1 | 18 September 2011 | 20 September 2011 | 52,000 | 6 |
| 1.2 | 25 September 2011 | 27 September 2011 | 55,000 | 7 |
| 1.3 | 2 October 2011 | 4 October 2011 | 51,000 | 6 |
| 1.4 | 9 October 2011 | 11 October 2011 | 57,000 | 6 |
| 1.5 | 16 October 2011 | 18 October 2011 | 57,000 | 6 |
| 1.6 | 23 October 2011 | 25 October 2011 | 47,000 | 9 |
| 1.7 | 30 October 2011 | 1 November 2011 | 50,000 | 6 |
| 1.8 | 6 November 2011 | 8 November 2011 | 69,000 | 7 |
| 1.9 | 13 November 2011 | 15 November 2011 | 55,000 | 8 |
| 1.10 | 20 November 2011 | 22 November 2011 | 57,000 | 9 |
| 2.1 | 18 March 2012 | none | 47,000 | 9 |
| 2.2 | 25 March 2012 | none | 41,000 | 9 |
| 2.3 | 1 April 2012 | none | 51,000 | 9 |
| 2.4 | 8 April 2012 | none | 56,000 | 9 |
| 2.5 | 15 April 2012 | none | 45,000 | 9 |
| 2.6 | 22 April 2012 | none | 49,000 | 9 |
| 2.7 | 29 April 2012 | none | 48,000 | n/a |
| 2.8 | 6 May 2012 | none | 39,000 | n/a |
| 3.1 | 17 March 2013 | 20 March 2013 | 45,000 | n/a |
| 3.2 | 24 March 2013 | 27 March 2013 | 64,000 | n/a |
| 3.3 | 31 March 2013 | 3 April 2013 | 35,000 | n/a |
| 3.4 | 7 April 2013 | 10 April 2013 | 50,000 | n/a |
| 3.5 | 14 April 2013 | 17 April 2013 | 38,000 | n/a |
| 3.6 | 21 April 2013 | 24 April 2013 | 33,000 | n/a |
| 3.7 | 28 April 2013 | 1 May 2013 | 34,000 | n/a |
| 3.8 | 5 May 2013 | 8 May 2013 | N/A | N/A |

== See also ==
- List of Welsh television series
