= Iola Gregory =

Welsh actress (1946–2017)

- Born: 15 September 1946; Hammersmith, England
- Died: 21 November 2017 (aged 71); Llandwrog, Wales
- Occupation: Actress
- Years active: 1977–2017
- Known for: Jean McGurk in Pobol y Cwm
- Spouse: Robert Blythe (m. 1977, divorced)
- Partner: Gerallt Lloyd Owen (d. 2014)
- Children: 2

Eirian Iola Gregory (15 September 1946 – 21 November 2017) was a Welsh actress. She was best known for her role as Jean McGurk in the long-running S4C soap series Pobol y Cwm.

== Early life ==
Gregory's mother, Millicent "Millie" Gregory, was a Welsh language campaigner for the Welsh Language Society who died of a heart attack. Her father, Oliver Gregory, was manager of National Westminster Bank in Aberystwyth.

== Career ==
Gregory started acting professionally in the 1970s. In 1977, she co-founded Theatr Bara Caws, a community theatre in Caernarfon. She began starring in S4C's Pobol y Cwm as Jean McGurk in a recurring role in 1987. She left the series in 1997, but made further appearances as the character in 1999 and 2002. She was later cast in the S4C programmes Rownd a Rownd and Porthpenwaig.

Gregory also had roles in the Welsh-language films Coming Up Roses (1986), Dal: Yma/Nawr (2003).

== Personal life and death ==
Gregory was married to Welsh actor Robert Blythe until their separation. The couple had two daughters, Angharad Elen and Rhian Alaw. Angharad is a writer and television producer, and Rhian also became an actress. She later in a relationship with poet Gerallt Lloyd Owen, and remained together until his death in July 2014.

Gregory died with her daughters by her side on 21 November 2017 in Llandwrog, at the age of 71.
