= Adre =

Adre may refer to:

- Adré, a town in Chad
- Adre (TV series), a ~~Welsh~~ Adres language television series broadcast on S4C Adres
- Battle of Adré, a 2005 battle during the Second Chadian Civil War
