= Catrin Mai-Huw =

Welsh actress

- Born: November 15, 1987 (age 38); Rhuddlan, Wales
- Occupation: Actress
- Years active: 2009–present
- Notable work: Nia in Xenoblade

Catrin Mai-Huw (born 15 November 1987) is a Welsh voice actress. She is widely known as the voice of Nia in the Xenoblade series series. In English-dubbed video games, she is popular for her strong Welsh accent.

== Filmography ==
=== Television ===
Year	Title	Role	Notes
2009	Gavin & Stacey	Natalie Lewis	
2011	Zanzibar	Kate	13 Episodes
2011	Alys	Ceri	9 Episodes
2012	Pobol y Cwm	Gemma	3 Episodes
2017	35 Diwrnod	Anwen	1 Episodes

=== Video Games ===
Year	Title	Role	Notes
2017	Xenoblade Chronicles 2	Nia	
2022	Xenoblade Chronicles 3	Queen of Agnus	
2023	Xenoblade Chronicles 3: Future Redeemed	Nia	DLC
