= Bang (TV series) =

- Title card
- Genre: Crime drama; police procedural
- Created by: Roger Williams
- Directed by: Philip John; Ashley Way
- Starring: Jacob Ifan; Catrin Stewart; Jack Parry Jones; Suzanne Packer; Nia Roberts
- Theme music composer: Greg Fleming
- Country of origin: United Kingdom (Wales)
- Original languages: Welsh; English
- No. of series: 2
- No. of episodes: 14

Production
- Executive producers: Roger Williams; Patrick Irwin; Gub Neal
- Producer: Catrin Lewis Defis
- Production location: Port Talbot
- Cinematography: Mark Milsome
- Running time: 60 minutes (inc. adverts)
- Production companies: Artists Studio; Joio TV

Original release
- Network: S4C
- Release: 10 September 2017 – 29 March 2020

Bang is a Welsh (Note: Demonym) bilingual television crime drama series, created by Roger Williams, featuring both the English and Welsh which was first broadcast on S4C on 10 September 2017. The show, set in Port Talbot, Wales, stars Jacob Ifan as Sam Jenkins, a loner who becomes entangled in a web of lies after coming into possession of a gun, and Catrin Stewart as his sister Gina, who is a police detective. The second series was broadcast on S4C in February–March 2020.

Initial broadcasts carried entirely English subtitles (although these need to be accessed by the viewer, and do not appear on screen), while repeat airings carried encoded English subtitles for scenes spoken in Welsh. The series was concurrently available on the BBC iPlayer as part of the BBC's ongoing relationship with S4C.

== Cast ==
- Jacob Ifan as Sam Jenkins, a loner who works for a local distribution firm
- Catrin Stewart as PC Gina Jenkins, Sam's sister
- Nia Roberts as Linda Murray, Sam and Gina's mother
- Jack Parry Jones as PC Luke Lloyd, Gina's long-term work partner
- Suzanne Packer as Chief Inspector Layla Davies, head of police
- Rebecca Hayes as Mel
- Rhydian Jones as Russell
- Gareth Jewell as DI Carl Roberts (series 1)
- Sara Lloyd as Patricia Rose, wife of murder victim Stevie Rose (series 1)
- Chris Reilly as Ray Murray, Sam's stepfather who owns a local builder's yard (series 1)
- Kate Jarman as Marie (series 1)
- Matthew Aubrey as Rhys (series 1)
- Lily Enticknap as Ruby (series 1)
- Gwyneth Keyworth as Ela (series 1)
- Jake Burgum as Neil (series 1)
- Ceri Murphy as Aled (series 1)
- Gillian Elisa as Liz (series 1)
- Claire Cage as Leanne (series 1)
- Owain Gwynne as Cai (series 1)
- Alexandria Riley as Tracy (series 1)
- Neal McWilliams as Paul (series 1)
- Dyfan Dwyfor as DI Morgan Riley (series 2)
- David Hayman as Jeff Campbell, a local crime boss (series 2)
- Hedydd Dylan as Caryn (series 2)
- Tim Preston as Harri (series 2)
- Chris Gordon as Richie (series 2)
- Alexander Vlahos as Dai (series 2)
- Rachel Issac as Eve (series 2)
- Sophie Melville as Marissa (series 2)
- Berwyn Pearce as Duncan (series 2)
- Lloyd Everitt as Mark (series 2)
- Lisa Nicol as Jan (series 2)
- Luke Jones as Extra (series 1)

== Production ==
Series	Episodes	Originally released	
Series	Episodes	First released	Last released
1	8	10 September 2017	29 October 2017
2	6	23 February 2020	29 March 2020

=== Series 1 (2017) ===
No. overall	No. in series	Title	Directed by	Written by	Original release date	Wales viewers (millions)
1	1	"Episode 1"	Philip John	Roger Williams	10 September 2017	0.049
Whilst investigating the theft of a fruit machine from a local pool hall, PCs Gina Jenkins and Luke Lloyd discover the body of local businessman Stevie Rose floating in the local marina. When a murder investigation is launched, Gina sees it as an opportunity to work her way up into CID. But despite bedding DI Carl Roberts, Gina finds her progress being impeded by Chief Inspector Layla Davies. Meanwhile, Gina's brother Sam is finding life difficult working all hours god sends and trying to look after his Nan, whose health is rapidly failing. Returning from work one afternoon, Sam is confronted by a new neighbour, Rhys, who then steals his bike. When Sam tries to retrieve it, he receives an unexpected proposal from Rhys' girlfriend Mel.
2	2	"Episode 2"	Philip John	Roger Williams	17 September 2017	0.045
Carl begins to interrogate Stevie's family and friends in a bid to shed some light on his murder. Gina follows up on the reports of gunshots on Sam's estate and begins to suspect Rhys and Mel's involvement, unaware that Sam is struggling under the pressure of keeping his secret to himself. A loanshark with connections to Stevie is badly beaten by a gang of thugs. Layla is surprised when Patricia unexpectedly offers a reward for information relating to her husband's murder. Sam is devastated when his Nan's failing health finally gets the better of her.
3	3	"Episode 3"	Ashley Way	Roger Williams	24 September 2017	0.046
Gina finally makes to make her way onto the investigation team, but the discovery of a second body poses the team more questions than answers. When Sam's employers get wind that someone has been stealing from the warehouse, a thorough search is conducted, and Sam fears he is to be found out – but when co-worker Cai is found to have a stolen child's toy in his locker, he is assumed to be the thief and is fired on the spot. Cai pressures Sam into compensating him for losing his job, and the pair decide to rob one of the company's vans full of expensive electrical equipment.
4	4	"Episode 4"	Ashley Way	Roger Williams	1 October 2017	0.039
Tired of Ray's constant niggling, Sam decides to get revenge by staging a second robbery, this time on his builder's yard. However, Sam's plans go disastrously wrong when Cai pulls the gun on a security guard who catches them in the act. Realising that the police are closing in, Cai decides to leave town, but not before trying to reclaim his half of the money from the van robbery. Gina is angry when she is sent home from work by Layla, and is surprised to be approached by Patricia, who tries to offer her money in return for undisclosed information on the case.
5	5	"Episode 5"	Philip John	Roger Williams	8 October 2017	0.036
Gina comes across information that casts fresh light on her father's death and the discovery leads to an honest conversation with Linda about the past. Sam panics when the police interview him about Cai. Sam meets a woman called Ela who turns his life upside down. Following a wild night out, Sam plays with fire.
6	6	"Episode 6"	Philip John	Roger Williams	15 October 2017	0.033
Gina and Luke attempt to find the thieves who targeted the bar and Sam and Ela decide to disappear. While staying at a hotel Sam and Ela take advantage of another guest with heartbreaking consequences for Sam. Gina searches for more information about her father's death and she chooses to lie to Patricia.
7	7	"Episode 7"	Philip John	Roger Williams	22 October 2017	0.036
Gina starts to suspect Sam and the truth comes out about the gun. Gina is forced to make a difficult decision and a meeting with Douglas Rose floors her. Two faces from the past come looking for Sam and he fears for his life.
8	8	"Episode 8"	Philip John	Roger Williams	29 October 2017	0.040
Rhys and Mel threaten Ela in an attempt to find Sam and the gun and Gina has some hard questions for Linda about her exact role in Gwyn's crimes. Gina is horrified to learn Sam is in danger and she agrees to give Rhys the gun. An unexpected arrival turns up at Gina and Rhys's meeting and the truth about Stevie Rose's murder is revealed. Gina discovers something in Ray and Linda's house that leads Sam to remember what exactly happened to his father.

=== Series 2 (2020) ===
No. overall	No. in series	Title	Directed by	Written by	Original release date	S4C viewers (millions)
9	1	"Episode 1"	Philip John	Roger Williams	23 February 2020	0.025
A murder investigation is launched when a body is discovered hanging upside down in an abandoned horse box on Aberavon beach. Detective Sergeant Gina Jenkins sets out to find the killer, but the case coincides with her brother's long anticipated release from prison.
10	2	"Episode 2"	Philip John	Roger Williams	1 March 2020	0.027
The discovery of a second body leads police to believe they are searching for a serial killer. Connections are made between the murder victims and a historic rape investigation. Sam starts to find his feet but struggles when his mother reaches out to him.
11	3	"Episode 3"	Philip John	Roger Williams	8 March 2020	0.018
The killer targets his third victim and the killing has a seismic impact on Sam and Gina's world. The police step up their efforts to protect the accused men and start to monitor their mobile phones. The killer's identity is revealed.
12	4	"Episode 4"	Philip John	Roger Williams	15 March 2020	N/A (<0.024)
Wynn Edwards is located and new evidence brings a surprising revelation. Following a fourth death, the police act to protect Richie and Duncan, but Duncan takes a risk that has a deadly conclusion. Sam finds work and starts to realise all is not well in Caryn's world.
13	5	"Episode 5"	Philip John	Roger Williams	22 March 2020	N/A (<0.024)
The police mount an unusual operation in an attempt to catch the killer but the operation fails when Harri interferes. Richie is attacked at the police station and the identity of the killer is revealed. Sam attempts to help Caryn and is required to stand up to Morgan once and for all.
14	6	"Episode 6"	Philip John	Roger Williams	29 March 2020	0.025
As the police race to find the killer, Morgan disappears. While Gina and Luke search for Harri, Sam and Linda do their best to protect Caryn. The strands of the stories come together in an explosive conclusion and the truths are revealed once and for all.

== Production ==
Series creator Roger Williams said of the bilingual nature of the script; "It was very much about story; a strong story that would get people tuning in every week to see what would happen. Then the conversation about language started to happen. Port Talbot isn't the strongest place for the Welsh language. There are quite a small percentage of speakers compared with Carmarthenshire, Ceredigion, Gwynedd. From that stumbling block I started to think: ‘Why don’t we reflect the linguistic diversity of a place like Port Talbot?’ For all of us who are bilingual, the reality is that we live our lives through two languages."
