= Kate Jarman =

Welsh actress

- Born: 1980 (age 45–46); Cardiff, Wales
- Occupation: Actress
- Years active: 2000–present
- Website: http://www.katejarman.co.uk

Kate Jarman (born 1980 in Cardiff, Wales) is a Welsh actress. She is most well known for playing lead characters in Hearts of Gold, Nice Girl and Pobol Y Cwm

== Education ==
Jarman graduated from the Welsh College of Music and Drama, Cardiff with a Bachelor of Arts degree in acting, followed by a Masters in Musical Theatre.

== Career ==
In 1999, whilst still in her first year at college, Jarman was cast in BBC2's Nice Girl, directed by Dominic Savage. She played character Mel opposite Steve Meo. Whilst continuing her studies at the Welsh College Jarman continued to work on numerous television productions, including appearing in HTV series Nuts and Bolts, Series 3 and 4, Score working alongside Eve Myles Sue Johnston Robert Pugh and television film Mindblowing directed by Euros Lyn.

In 2003 Jarman was cast in her first leading role, as Bethan Powell in BBC1 network two-part drama Hearts of Gold alongside Jeremy Sheffield, Geraldine James, David Troughton, Judy Parfitt and David Warner.

In addition to her roles in television and film, Jarman has recorded a number of BBC audiobooks.

Kate Jarman also appeared in the episode The Convent of the BBC's Murphy's Law and Dose, a short film written by Irvine Welsh. She then went on to play Erin Medi in the Welsh television soap opera Pobol Y Cwm.

She has most recently appeared in the Welsh television drama series Alys series 1 & 2.

She lives near Llantrisant.

== Filmography ==
- 2000: Nice Girl - 'Mel' (television film)
- 2000: Iechyd Da - Mel
- 2000: Diwrnod Hollol Mindblowing Heddiw - 'Alis'
- 2001: Score - 'Sandra' (television film)
- 2002: A Mind to Kill - 'Tessa Kemp' (1 episode: "Blood and Water")
- 2003: Dose - 'Rhiannon' (television film)
- 2003: Hearts of Gold - 'Nurse Bethan Powell' (television film)
- 2004: Murphy's Law - 'Sr. Josephine' (1 episode: Convent)
- 2004: Bang Bang I Love You - 'Kate' (short)
- 2005: Pobol Y Cwm - 'Erin Medi'
- 2006: Pobol Y Cwm - 'Erin Medi'
- 2007: Pobol Y Cwm - 'Erin Medi'
- 2010: Pen Talar - Fion
- 2010: Alys - 'Angie' (Season 1, 8 episodes)
- 2011: Alys - 'Angie' (Season 2, 8 episodes)

== Radio & Audio ==
- 2000, Radio, Karen, STATION ROAD, BBC Radio Wales
- 2002, Radio, WOULDN'T IT BE BETTER IF HE DIED IN THE END, BBC Radio 4, Alison Hindell
- 2003, Audio, THE HOMECOMING, BBC Audio Books, Catrin Collier
- 2004, Audio, BEGGARS & CHOOSERS, BBC Audio Books, Catrin Collier
- 2004, Audio, NO CHILD OF MINE, BBC Audio Books, Gwen Maddoc
- 2004, Audio, THE OTHER WOMAN, BBC Audio Books, Iris Gower
- 2005, Audio, WINNERS & LOSERS, BBC Audio Books, Catrin Collier
- 2006, Audio, FINDERS & KEEPERS, BBC Audio Books, Catrin Collier
- 2006, Audio, SINNERS & SHADOWS, BBC Audio Books, Catrin Collier
- 2007, Audio, TIGER BAY BLUES, BBC Audio Books, Catrin Collier
- 2007, Audio, TIGER RAGTIME, BBC Audio Books, Catrin Collier
- 2008, Audio, Autobiography, TIME TO SAY HELLO, BBC Audio Books, kathryn Jenkins
- 2008, Audio, ONE LAST SUMMER, BBC Audio Books, Catrin Collier
- 2008, Audio, MAGDA'S DAUGHTER, BBC Audio Books, Catrin Collier
- 2010, Audio, Reader, EMLYN'S MOON, BBC, Laura Northedge
