= Lauren Phillips (Welsh actress) =

Welsh actress

Lauren Phillips (born 1981) is a Welsh television actress from Bridgend, Wales.

Lauren is from the village of Penyfai and was educated at Ysgol Llanhari. She was later offered a place to study at the Liverpool Institute for Performing Arts.

She is best known for playing the no-nonsense character, Kelly Evans, in the Welsh TV soap Pobol y Cwm. She originally played the character between 2003 and 2007, reprising the role in 2015, covering social issues such as bulimia in the early years. She has also played the role of art teacher Sara Harries in the S4C dramas Caerdydd and Gwaith/Cartref. She also starred in Series 2 of Torchwood, Dead Man Walking.

Lauren lives in Pontcanna in Cardiff. She was visited by Nia Parry in 2021 to film an episode of the S4C series, Adre, about her home and her life.
