= Adam Lewis =

Adam Lewis may refer to:

- Adam Lewis (composer)
- Adam Lewis (footballer)
