= Sara Gregory =

Welsh actress

- Born: Sara Lloyd-Gregory; 19 August 1986 (age 40); Ammanford, Wales, United Kingdom
- Occupation: Actress
- Years active: 2003–present
- Notable work: Alys (2011–2012)
- Spouse: Carwyn Jones
- Children: 1
- Awards: BAFTA Cymru Award for Best Actress (2013) – Alys

Sara Lloyd-Gregory (born 19 August 1986), also billed as Sara Gregory, is a British actress from Ammanford, Wales. She is known for her leading role in the S4C drama series Alys and appearing in the Sky1 series Thorne: Sleepyhead.

== Early life ==
Sara Gregory was born in Ammanford in 1986 to Yvonne (née Lloyd) and Adrian Gregory. She attended Maes yr Yrfa School in Cross Hands and had studied ballet from the age of three. She was intent on becoming a dancer until the age of 16, when she developed an interest in acting. Following her high school graduation, she went on to study at Gorseinon College in Swansea for a brief time, although her ambition to perform would prevail. She enrolled at the Royal Welsh College of Music & Drama, a conservatoire in Cardiff, from which she never graduated. She opted instead to pursue a career on screen, a decision which proved successful due to her affiliation with the Mark Jermin Stage School and his agency.

== Career ==
Her debut came in 2003 in Stopping Distance, a film about gang rape in which she appeared as a teenage girl called Melanie. In 2004, she made her second stage appearance, this time as teenager Julie Osman—the daughter of a Turkish Muslim man who was the victim of a racially motivated murder in South Wales—in A Way of Life.

In 2006, she completed a hat-trick of appearances in controversial films by portraying the role of a girl called Serena in Little White Lies. The film was a comedy which featured racism and was, like A Way of Life, filmed in South Wales. Later that year, she starred in the Torchwood episode "Day One" as a young woman called Carys Fletcher who is possessed by an alien that feeds off orgasmic energy. In 2007, she became one of the regular cast of the BBC Wales drama Belonging, as Nadine Weaver.

In 2008, she played the female lead in Romeo and Juliet at the New Theatre, Cardiff.

In 2011, she starred in the lead role of the new S4C Welsh television series Alys. She returned for the second season of Alys which was broadcast in late 2012. In 2013, Sara won the BAFTA Cymru Award for Best Actress, following her role as Alys.

In 2018 and 2019, she played Amy in two series of the BBC Wales mockumentary Tourist Trap.

== Personal life ==
Gregory's partner is actor Carwyn Jones; they have a son, Idris.

== Film and television appearances ==
Film
Year	Title	Role	Directed by
2004	A Way of Life	Julie Osman	Amma Asante
2006	Little White Lies	Serena	Caradog W. James
2008	Affinity	Madeleine	Tim Fywell
2010	S.N.U.B!	Anna	Jonathan Glendening
2010	Patagonia	Chica del Valle	Marc Evans
2013	Another Me	Woman with baby	Isabel Coixet
2014	Get Up and Go	Ella	Brendan Grant
2015	Under Milk Wood	Gossamer Beynon	Kevin Allen

Television
Year	Title	Role	Notes
2003	Stopping Distance	Melanie	TV movie
2006	Torchwood	Carys Fletcher	Series 1 (guest; #1.2)
2007	Y Pris	Llio Edwards	Series 1 (recurring; 4 episodes)
2008	Belonging	Nadine	Series 9 (main; 7 episodes)
2008	Tess of the d'Urbervilles	Nancy Darch	Miniseries (episode 1)
2009	Doctors	Carmel Coates	Series 11 (guest; #11.15)
2009	Blodau	Cat	S4C drama series
2009	Sleep with Me	Young Lelia	TV movie
2010	Being Human	Amy McBride	Series 2 (guest; #2.8)
2010	Thorne: Sleepyhead	Alison Willetts	Series 1 (supporting; 3 episodes)
2011	Bloody Norah	Amy	TV movie
2011–2012	Alys	Alys	Series 1 & 2 (main; 16 episodes)
2013	Doctors	Olwyn Prytherch	Series 15 (guest; #15.20)
2013–2016	Hinterland	Catrin John	Series 1 & 3 (guest; 2 episodes)
2014	The Devil’s Vice	Suzanne	TV movie
2014	Cara Fi	Manon	Series 1 (guest; #1.3)
2016–2017	Byw Celwydd	Lowri Ogwen Jones	Series 1 & 2 (main; 16 episodes)
2017	Doctors	Rachael Lambert	Series 18 (guest; #18.183/#18.184)
2018	Casualty	Carly McLeod	Series 32 (guest; #32.30)
2018–2019	Tourist Trap	Amy	Series 1 & 2 (main; 12 episodes)
2021	The Pembrokeshire Murders	Leanne Dauncey	Miniseries (episode 3)
2021	Bregus	Lucy	Series 1 (guest; #1.1/#1.2)
2021	Manhunt	Alice Turner	Series 2 (guest; #2.1)
2021	On the Edge	Hayley	Series 3 (guest; #3.2)
2022	Casualty	Hannah Evans	Series 36 (guest; #36.44)
2023	Yr Amgueddfa	Annette	Series 2 (4 episodes)
2023	Anfamol	Nia	Series 1 (5 episodes)
2024	Creisis	Janette	Series 1
2024–present	Pobol y Cwm	Eleri Beynon	Series regular
