= List of Alys episodes =

Alys is a Welsh language television series which began airing in early 2011 on S4C. The first series commenced on 23 January 2011 and consisted of eight episodes. The series rated well for S4C and a second series was produced in early 2012 and began airing on 11 November 2012. Series two consisted of a further eight episodes. As of 2016, the programme has not been renewed for a third series. During the course of the programme, 16 episodes of Alys aired over two series, concluding on 30 December 2012.

Note: The text highlighted in bold are subsidiary titles given for each episode.

== Series overview ==
Series	Episodes	Originally released	
Series	Episodes	First released	Last released
1	8	23 January 2011	13 March 2011
2	8	11 November 2012	30 December 2012

== Series 1 (2011) ==
No. overall	No. in series	Title	Directed by	Written by	Original release date	UK viewers (millions)
1	1	"Pennod (Welsh for 'Episode') 1"	Gareth Byrn	Siwan Jones	23 January 2011	0.61
**Goroesiad y cymhwysaf** (Welsh for 'Survival of the fittest') Alys and her son Daniel move to a small West Wales town to make a fresh start and to escape their past from Cardiff.
2	2	"Pennod 2"	Gareth Byrn	Siwan Jones	30 January 2011	0.53
**Mae cachu nhw'n drewi fel pawb arall** (Welsh for 'Their shit stinks like everyone else's') Alys steals from the clothes shop below her flat, Daniel gets into a fight on his first day of school. Alys begins to have nightmares about her past in Cardiff.
3	3	"Pennod 3"	Lee Haven-Jones	Siwan Jones	6 February 2011	0.71
**'Na beth sy ar goll yn ein cymdeithas ni heddi... pobal sy'n fadlon stico'u penne lan dros y parapet!** (Welsh for 'That's what's missing from today's society... people willing to poke their heads up above the parapet!') Alys steals books from the library and is spotted by Willam's nephew, Iestyn. Kevin and Shane find the Chinese empty and a decapitated body in the room upstairs. Debbie becomes suspicious of Alys and Toms. Alys and Ceri go out for the night while Kevin is supposed to be watching Daniel, and Ceri begins to act strangely when she recognises their taxi driver. Ceri self harms.
4	4	"Pennod 4"	Lee Haven-Jones	Siwan Jones	13 February 2011	0.65
**Pwy ma'n meddwl yw hi?** (Welsh for 'Who does she think she is?') Alys realises that Ceri knew all along about Kevin and Vicky and their child. Angie and Chris discuss Alys' private life, and Chris confronts Alys about being on the game. Alys finds the taxi driver looking around outside the flats. Ceri attacks Kevin. Alys is caught stealing from a hotel.
5	5	"Pennod 5"	Lee Haven-Jones	Siwan Jones	20 February 2011	0.49
**Pwy sy'n twyllo pwy** (Welsh for 'Who's deceiving who?') Ron offers Alys a job as a cleaner at his house, and Debbie warns Alys to stay away for her own good. To avoid his and Ron's secret being discovered, Toms tells Kevin and Shane to break into Ron's house and steal his laptop. Debbie and Ron return to find that their home has been broken into and Debbie finds her dog, Toots, dead. She tells Ron not to report it as she knows what's on the laptop. Alys begins to search for the taxi driver, as it turns out that he raped Ceri. The taxi driver later turns up at the flats and attacks Alys.
6	6	"Pennod 6"	Rhys Powys	Siwan Jones	27 February 2011	0.42
**Ma' 'na shwd beth â thrais cyfiawn** (Welsh for 'There is such a thing as jusifiable violence') Alys, Wiliam and Ceri find the taxi driver and take revenge. The search is on for the stolen laptop, while Debbie tells Ron that she knows there are pictures of young girls on it, Toms searches the flats and threatens Kevin who wants money for returning the laptop to him. Heulwen visits her sister who she hasn't seen in twenty years, her sister turns out to be Alys' mum, but Heulwen doesn't know that it's the same Alys who lives close to her. William is told that he is invited to his daughters wedding. Shane is arrested in connection with the body found at the Chinese. Alys lends the laptop from Kevin's flat and she and Wiliam discover what's on it, Toms shows up at Alys' flat.
7	7	"Pennod 7"	Rhys Powys	Siwan Jones	6 March 2011	0.49
**Ma'n rhan o'r natur ddynol... edrych ar ôl dy hunan gyntaf** (Welsh for 'It's part of human nature... look at yourself first') The laptop is still missing, Alys is demanding money from Debbie and Ron for the laptop or she'll go to the police, Kevin is demanding Toms give him the money but wants Alys to stay out of it, but Alys needs the money because she thinks it's time she and Daniel moved to America, Bessie then threatens Alys to stay away. Wiliam goes to his daughter, Catrin's wedding reception where she and her new husband are happy to see him, but he gets drunk and leaves early. Rons pays two men to go the flats to shut Alys up, but when they find she isn't there, the attack Wiliam, Alys turns up and tries to save him.
8	8	"Pennod 8"	Rhys Powys	Siwan Jones	13 March 2011	0.42
**...Ti sy'n gyfrif am bopeth ti'n neud...** (Welsh for '...You're responsible for everything you do...') Alys goes to see Wiliam in hospital after the attack, there she reveals to him that she killed her boyfriend, Mike, by causing the car crash. She returns to the hospital later to discover he is gone and goes to his flat where Iestyn tells her she has nothing to do with him. Debbie plans to give Alys the money in exchange for the laptop, but Ron has a heart attack while trying to talk her out of it. Alys can't find the laptop as the council have taken everything from the yard, and tells Debbie. Alys discovers that Heulwen is her aunt. Ceri decides to go to the funeral of the 17-year-old girl that the taxi driver has raped and murdered, but when she goes to the house of the girls family, she find it empty with only the taxi driver inside, will she survive? Toms tells Shane to set fire to the garage, but Kevin tries to stop him. Daniel tells Alys that he has the laptop hidden, and while in Wiliam's empty flat they hear an explosion, they look to see from a distance that the garage in on fire. Note: Final appearance of Catrin-Mai Huw as Ceri.

== Series 2 (2012) ==
No. overall	No. in series	Title	Directed by	Written by	Original release date	UK viewers (millions)
9	1	"Pennod 1"	Unknown	Siwan Jones	11 November 2012	0.44
**...Ma' Duw wedi Marw!** (Welsh for '...God is dead!') Picking up where the previous series left off, Alys hands the laptop over to Debbie in exchange for £10,000, Shane demands payment for setting fire to the garage, so that Toms could collect on the insurance, and a body in dumped in a nearby stream. Twelve months later, Alys is determined to find out who killed Ceri and is certain Phil, the taxi driver, is behind it. Toms has been committed to a mental hospital, and Heulwen is living in a caravan in her back garden as she is no longer able to make payments on her home, while Alys makes regular visits, as it has recently been revealed that Heulwen is her aunt. Meanwhile, a new couple, Dylan and Llio, decided to buy Heulwen and Toms' property, and Dylan is not exactly pleased about Heulwen's living arrangements. Alys and Daniel have moved into a new house opposite Bessie, Kevin and Shane, and they are unaware of her deceit of receiving money for the laptop. Wiliam returns, and the police arrive with bad news about the investigation into Ceri's murder. Note: Catrin-Mai Huw is credited for this episode, although she is only seen as part of the recap of the final episode of series 1 Final appearance of Aneirin Hugues as Toms; First appearances of Richard Harrington as Simon, Paul Morgans as Dylan and Carys Eleri as Llio
10	2	"Pennod 2"	Rhys Powys	Siwan Jones	18 November 2012	0.39
**Ti erio'd wedi camu mas o dy gorff a dishgwl miwn ar dy 'unan?** (Welsh for 'Have you ever stepped outside your own body and looked in on yourself?') Note: First appearance of Gareth Jewell as Phil
11	3	"Pennod 3"	Rhys Powys	Siwan Jones	25 November 2012	0.39
**...Ar yr hewl i uffern!** (Welsh for '...On the road to hell!')
12	4	"Pennod 4"	Rhys Powys	Siwan Jones	2 December 2012	0.37
**Yr unig beth alla'i neud yw neud beth wy'n credu sy'n iawn** (Welsh for 'The only thing I can do is do what I think is right')
13	5	"Pennod 5"	Dylan Richards	Siwan Jones	9 December 2012	0.35
**...Ma'r bwystfil rheibus nôl yn dre!** (Welsh for '...The voracious monster is back in town!')
14	6	"Pennod 6"	Paul Jones	Siwan Jones	16 December 2012	0.27
**...Ma' rhaid i'r ad-bryniad ddod o'r tu mewn** (Welsh for '...Redemption has to come from within')
15	7	"Pennod 7"	Paul Jones	Siwan Jones	23 December 2012	0.33
**...Wy'n sori ...wy mor sori!** (Welsh for '...I'm sorry ...I'm so sorry!')
16	8	"Pennod 8"	Paul Jones	Siwan Jones	30 December 2012	0.37
**...Beth ti mynd i weud 'thon nhw?** (Welsh for '...What are you going to tell them?') There could be terrible consequences for Phil when he bashes Martin over the head and leaves him for dead, but can Bessie persuade Alys to provide and alibi for him? Following the rape, Angie begins to have flashbacks of what Simon did to her, the night before in the office. Alys goes to meet Ron in his car but a nasty surprise awaits her when Alys is trapped inside with Ron and Terry in the back ready to film Alys and Ron; Wiliam shows up to rescue Alys. Wiliam reveals that he is dying of cancer. Debbie and Heulwen have Ron's laptop handed into the police, fooling him into believing that it had been stolen again when he find his home trashed. Simon is involved in a horrific car accident. Dylan reveals his secret to Llio that he does not have a degree when he returns home in a panic to find Llio in labour but before they make it out of the house, Sara's final act plays out when she locks the door, trapping Llio and Dylan in the bedroom. Llio eventually gives birth. The police arrive at Alys's house to ask about the whereabouts of Phil the night he attacked Martin. What will she decide? This is the final episode of Alys, despite finishing with an unresolved cliffhanger.

== Ratings ==
Alys : UK viewers per episode (thousands)

Season	Episode number								Average
Season	1	2	3	4	5	6	7	8	Average
1	61	53	71	65	49	42	49	42	54
2	44	39	39	37	35	27	33	37	36

Audience measurement performed by Broadcasters' Audience Research Board
