= Betsan Powys =

Welsh journalist

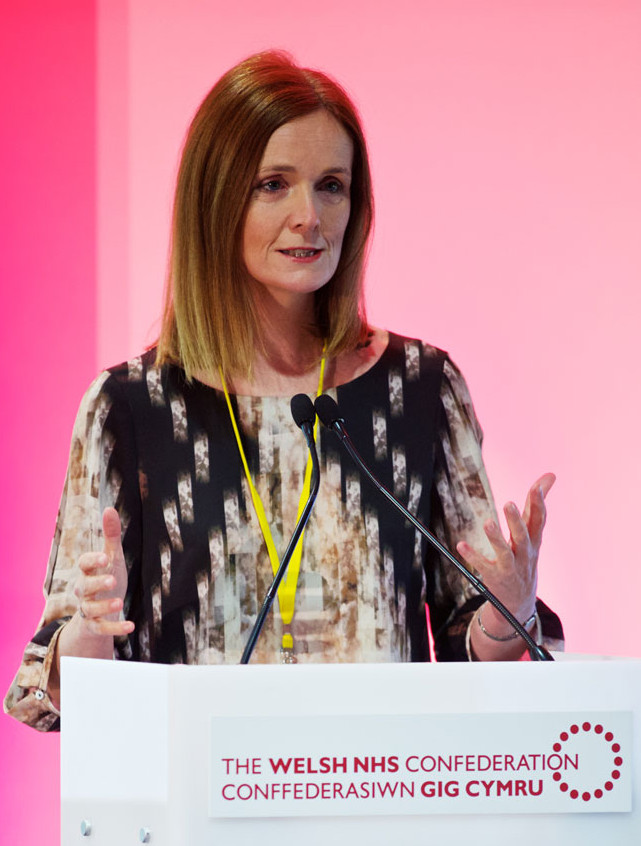
- Powys in December 2012
- Born: 1965 (age 60–61); Cardiff, Wales, United Kingdom
- Occupations: Journalist, television and radio broadcaster
- Title: Betsi Treganna (Bardic name)
- Partner: Dylan Howard

Betsan Powys (born 1965), is a Welsh journalist and former Editor of Programmes for BBC Radio Cymru.

== Biography ==
Powys was born in Cardiff. A native Welsh speaker after being educated at Ysgol Gyfun Llanhari, Powys joined BBC Wales as a News Trainee in 1989, before joining the newsroom in Cardiff as a bilingual, bi-media reporter. Moving to Current Affairs in 1994 she reported undercover, where one investigation required her to pose as one half of a swinging couple in the "Garden of Eden", a West Wales brothel.

Powys then presented the Welsh language news programme Newyddion, was chief reporter on the European current affairs series Ewropa, and joined Huw Edwards to front United Kingdom national election specials.

Powys was lent for a period to BBC One's flagship current affairs programme Panorama, during which time she returned to Wales to give birth to her daughter. Her first report for Panorama was an investigation into the way Jehovah's Witnesses deal with allegations of child abuse, while her first worldwide exclusive occurred when she persuaded the commanding officer of 30 Royal Welch Fusiliers held hostage in Goražde, Bosnia, to allow her to interview colleagues and friends, agreeing to his condition that the programme would be broadcast only "in the Gaelic tongue."

After working for a period at ITV Wales, she returned to BBC Wales as Culture and Media Correspondent, and as a result of presenting Week In Week Out she won the BT Welsh Journalist of the Year. Powys also presented the Welsh-language version of Mastermind on S4C.

From 11 September 2006, Powys replaced the retiring David Williams, and took editorial charge of all BBC Wales' daily political output ahead of the Welsh Assembly elections in 2007. She resigned from this role in June 2013.

Powys is a frequent contributor to Radio Cymru's popular Post Prynhawn and is regarded as a stalwart of the programme, adding much to its 'flagship' status as the BBC's most prestigious Bangor-produced daily news broadcasts. She was appointed Editor of Programmes (in effect, director) of BBC Radio Cymru in May 2013, taking up her post from July 2013. In June 2018, Powys announced that she would leave the role, with effect from Autumn 2018.

Since leaving the BBC, Powys has returned to broadcasting for both television and radio. In December 2019 she joined Dewi Llwyd and Vaughan Roderick as co-presenter for S4C and BBC Radio Cymru's coverage of the 2019 General Election (Etholiad 2019). During the Election campaign Powys also fronted The Leaders Lounge for BBC Radio Wales. In July 2020, she replaced Llwyd as presenter of Pawb a'i Farn (Welsh for 'Everyone's Opinion', a Welsh-language equivalent to Question Time).

== Personal life ==
Powys lives with Dylan Hammond, a former artist. She lists her hobbies as choral singing, harp music and competing in choral recitation competitions at local and chapel eisteddfodau. She is a member of the Gorsedd of the Bards and has adopted the bardic name Betsi Treganna.
