= Jacob Ifan =

Welsh actor (born 1993)

- Born: Jacob Ifan Prytherch; 28 April 1993 (age 32); Cardiff, Wales
- Education: Royal Welsh College of Music and Drama (BA)
- Occupation: Actor
- Years active: 2015–present

Jacob Ifan Prytherch (born 28 April 1993) is a Welsh actor. He is best known for his role as Jake Vickers in the BBC police drama series Cuffs (2015). He has also appeared in the series Bang (2017–2020), SAS: Rogue Heroes (2022–2025), and A Discovery of Witches (2021–2022).

Ifan graduated from the Royal Welsh College of Music and Drama in 2015, having already started shooting Cuffs.

== Filmography ==
=== Television ===
Year	Title	Role	Notes
2015	Cuffs	PC Jake Vickers	lead role
2016	Hinterland	Trystan Meilir	Series 3, Episode 1
2017–2020	Bang	Sam	S4C - lead role
2021–2022	A Discovery of Witches	Benjamin Fuchs	Season 2 and 3
2022	SAS: Rogue Heroes	Pat Riley	
2022	The Pact	Gethin	Season 2
2025	The Buccaneers	Hector Robinson	Season 2

=== Film ===
Year	Title	Role
2019	Music, War and Love	David Rosenwald
