= Baker Boys (2011 TV series) =

2011 British drama TV series

- Created by: Helen Raynor; Gary Owen
- Starring: Eve Myles; Gareth Jewell; Boyd Clack; Mark Lewis Jones; Matthew Gravelle; Cara Readle; Steve Meo
- Composer: Adam Lewis
- Country of origin: United Kingdom

Production
- Executive producer: Bethan Jones
- Producers: Nick Goding; Juliet Charlesworth
- Running time: Approx. 60 minutes

Original release
- Network: BBC One Wales
- Release: 23 January – 8 December 2011

Baker Boys is a television drama series produced by BBC Wales and broadcast on BBC One Wales. The series was written by Helen Raynor and Gary Owen. Torchwood creator Russell T Davies also had a role as creative consultant, which he fulfilled from Los Angeles. The first episode of the series was broadcast on 23 January 2011.

The programme follows the workers of Valley Bara bakery which is the economic centre of Trefynydd, a small fictional village in South Wales. Generations of people had earned a living and formed a life at the bakery but this is thrown into jeopardy when recession bites and the bakery workers find themselves unemployed overnight. Writer Helen Raynor describes it as "a blue collar drama", explaining "we wanted to tell the story of a community, with a workplace at the centre of it, who suddenly fall on hard times". The show is filmed and set in Trethomas (a village in Caerphilly), Bedwas (a village in Caerphilly) and Caerphilly.

== Cast ==
Actor	Character
Eve Myles	Sarah
Gareth Jewell	Owen
Boyd Clack	Gwynfor
Mark Lewis Jones	Pete
Matthew Gravelle	Rob
Cara Readle	Elen
Steve Meo	Rich
Amy Morgan	Shelly
Richard Corgan	Dave
Mali Harries	Lucy
Eiry Hughes	Karen
Joshua Jenkins	Nathan

== Episodes ==
=== Series one ===
Title	Airdate	Overview
"Episode one"	23 January 2011	The employees of Valley Bara Bakery find themselves unemployed overnight when the bakery's parent company goes bust. With their lives in turmoil, and facing a future on the dole, it looks like the beginning of the end for this close-knit community, before an outrageous idea from local joker and wide boy Owen opens up a world of possibilities.
"Episode two"	30 January 2011	Owen goes on a charm offensive, even recruiting Sarah onto the workers co-operative. This leaves Rob feeling left out in the cold, and ever more desperate to get Sarah away from Trefynydd.
"Episode three"	6 February 2011	Valley Bara is open for business. Co-managers Rob and Owen are working hard to make it a successful operation but a big order means pushing the workforce right to the limits. Sarah's wedding date is fast approaching and she has a big decision to make.

=== Series two ===
Title	Airdate	Overview
"Episode one"	24 November 2011	The Valley Bara Bakery is in limbo following Rob's disappearing act. It has been six weeks since Rob threatened to bring the co-operative down and he has not been in contact. At Rich's birthday bash tensions come to a head as the workforce let Owen know, loud and clear, that they hold him to blame for the situation.
"Episode two"	1 December 2011	The loss of the Capaldi contract hits Valley Bara hard. This results in tough decisions need to be made, as the workers are forced to go part-time. Rich and Shelley's budget stag and hen nights help them forget their troubles for a while, but everyone is feeling the pressure.
"Episode three"	8 December 2011	Owen, Sarah and Pete confront Rob regarding his plans to cut back on bakery staff. People are desperate, and a vote will tear the town apart. Is Shelley and Rich's homespun wedding the last time the community will come together?

== Reception ==
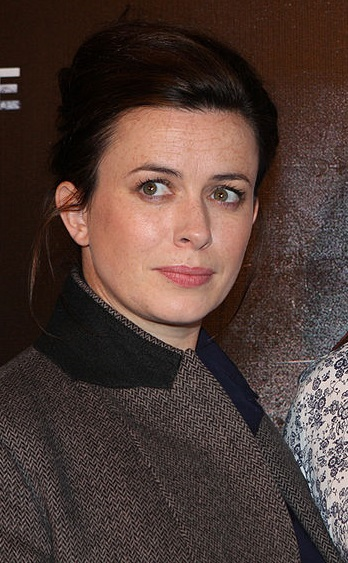
For portraying the character of Sarah, Eve Myles (pictured) earned a BAFTA Cymru nomination for Best Actress

Welsh newspaper The Western Mail responded positively to the series, with journalist Karen Price describing it as "a poignant drama, which will strike a chord with so many people, particularly in these times of recession". Scott Matthewman, writing for The Stage also praised the use of economic and social themes and expressed a desire to see a UK-wide broadcast of the series, concluding that "the whole country deserves to see the fabulous Baker Boys". To coincide with the shows second run of episodes on BBC Wales The Radio Times published an article by Gareth McClean also arguing in favour of a nationwide broadcast. McLean states:

While it’s by no means perfect, Baker Boys has heart and warmth and wit and, in these austere times, a real resonance. It’s also that increasingly unusual thing in TV – a blue-collar drama that feels authentic and honest.

The first series achieved strong viewing figures, being the second most-watched original broadcast on BBC Wales with an average of 294,000 viewers during the 2010/2011season. In 2012 the series received five nominations at the 21st annual Bafta Cymru award ceremony. Eve Myles and Mark Lewis Jones were nominated respectively for the Best Actress and Actor awards, whilst Helen Raynor and Gary Owen received a joint nomination for Best Writing and Mark Waters received a nomination for Photography and Lighting. The series received one award; with Adam Lewis winning an award for Best Original Music.

== See also ==
- List of Welsh television series
