= Ieuan Rhys =

Welsh actor

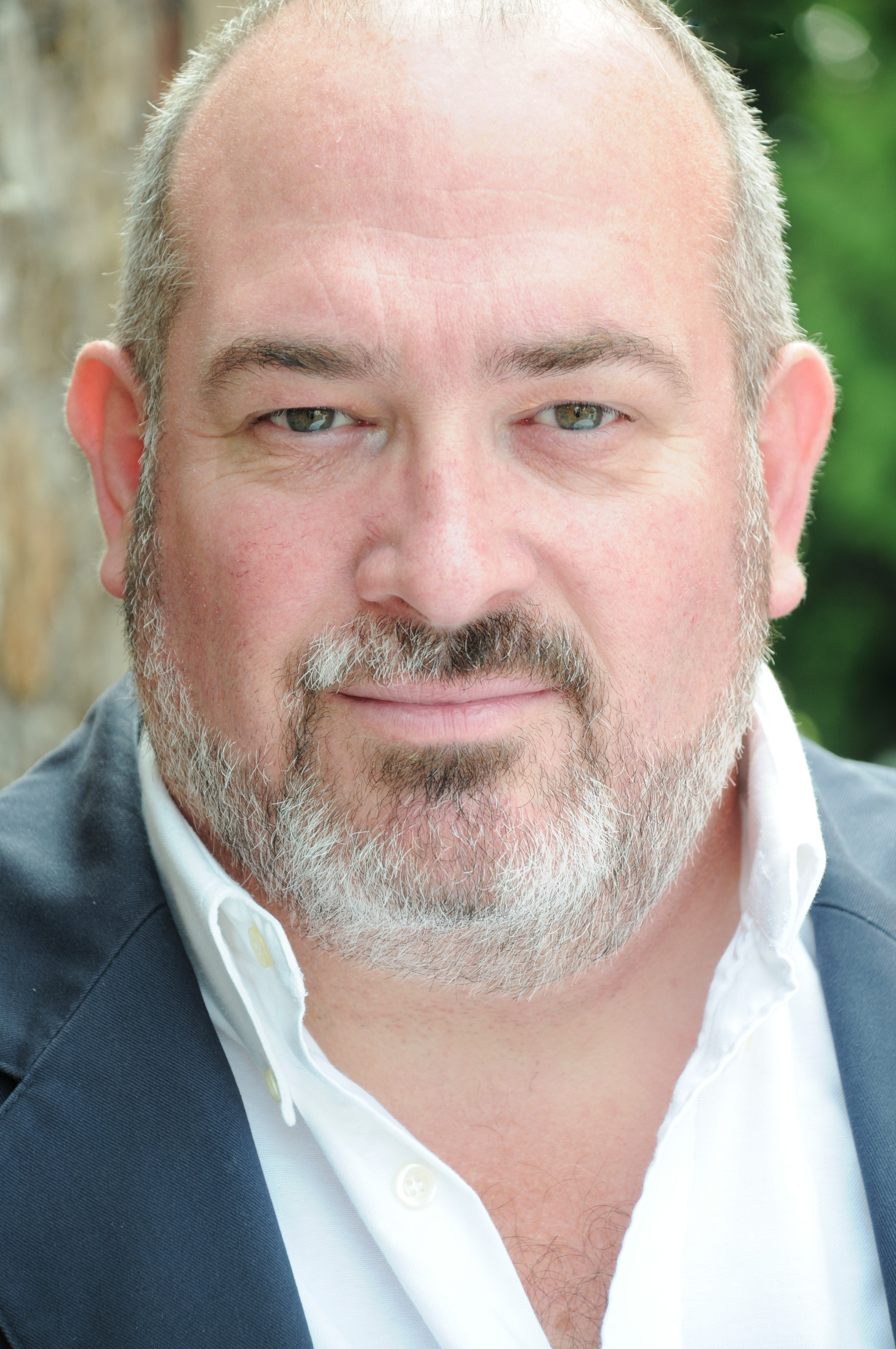
- Rhys in 2009
- Born: Ieuan Rhys Evans; 24 December 1961 (age 64); Trecynon, South Wales, UK
- Education: Royal Welsh College of Music & Drama
- Occupation: Actor
- Children: 2
- Website: www.ieuanrhys.com

Ieuan Rhys (born 24 December 1961) is a Welsh actor. His television work has included thirteen years in the BBC Cymru soap opera Pobol y Cwm, Sergeant Tom Swann in the last series of A Mind to Kill (for Fiction Factory/Channel 5) and six series of the Welsh-language version of Mr and Mrs – Sion a Sian for HTV. For the last four series he portrayed Eurig Bell, the "not to be messed with" deputy headmaster in S4C's Gwaith/Cartref.

== Biography ==
=== Early life ===
Ieuan Rhys was born Ieuan Rhys Evans in the village of Trecynon, near Aberdare, South Wales on 24 December 1961. He attended Ysgol Gynradd Gymraeg Aberdar primary school, and Ysgol Gyfun Rhydfelen secondary school near Pontypridd, both Welsh language schools. His father, Gethin Evans, was a music teacher at the nearby comprehensive school.

=== Theatre ===
Rhys trained as an actor at the Royal Welsh College of Music & Drama in Cardiff. His theatre work has included working for the National Theatre in London, playing the part of Bruce in People by Alan Bennett. He toured major theatres in England (July – November 2013), playing Dobchinsky in the UK tour of The Government Inspector for Communicado Theatre Company. He appeared in A Provincial Life National Theatre Wales, an adaptation by Peter Gill of a short story by Chekhov; Elwyn (Elling), directed by Michael Bogdanov; and Whose Coat Is That Jacket?, touring Wales alongside Hollyoaks star Terri Dwyer.

Other theatre credits include a UK tour as The Spruiker in The Thorn Birds – A Musical, Montague in Michael Bogdanov's production of Romeo and Juliet, Alfred Doolittle in My Fair Lady at Aberystwyth Arts Centre (2008), Burberry for Sherman Cymru, Cocks & Tales for Cwmni 3D, Pennington in The Hired Man (at The Torch Theatre, Milford Haven), The Servant of Two Masters, Contender, A Christmas Carol with Ron Moody as Scrooge, A Child's Christmas in Wales, Fiddler on the Roof at Aberystwyth Arts Centre (2006), Hamlet, Amazing Grace – The Musical, Cymbeline, The Merchant of Venice, Twelfth Night (for Wales Theatre Company), The Merry Wives of Windsor, The Winter's Tale, (at The Ludlow Festival, 2002–04), the award-winning production of Amdani (Sgript Cymru), Cwm Glo (Theatr Gwynedd), Seithenyn A'r Twrw Tanllyd Tanddwr (Canol Y Ffordd), and Oliver! at Aberystwyth Arts Centre. In September 2011, he appeared in Bred in Heaven for Frapetsus Theatre Company, written by Jack Llewellen and directed by Michael Bogdanov. The play, a follow-up to the popular 1978 BBC Wales comedy drama Grand Slam, is described as "a two-hour romp filled with laughs, double meanings and camp humour."

The summer of 2023 saw Rhys back on stage in Aberystwyth for his fourth summer season at Aberystwyth Arts Centre, playing Brian in the stage adaptation of the popular film Brassed Off.

He has also appeared in many pantomimes, including Snow White at The Coliseum, Aberdare and tours with Stan Stennett in Cinderella and Owen Money in three productions of Aladdin, Jack and the Beanstalk and Cinderella (directed by Michael Bogdanov). He has played Dame twice for the Welsh-language panto's Hansel & Gretel and Aladdin with Martyn Geraint. At Christmas 2012, Rhys appeared in Sleeping Beauty at the New Marlowe Theatre in Canterbury with Gareth Gates and Toyah Willcox. For the 2013 season he appeared alongside Stephen Mulhern in Cinderella at The Hawth Theatre Crawley. In 2014–15, he played King Dafydd at The Octagon Theatre, in Yeovill's Jack & The Beanstalk. In 2015–16, he appeared alongside Coronation Street's Chris Gascoyne in Aladdin at The Lyceum Theatre in Sheffield. In the 2017–18 pantomime season, he appeared in Sleeping Beauty at the Grove Theatre, Dunstable, as King Cuthbert, alongside Sally Lindsay and John Partridge. 2018–19 saw Rhys with CBeebies' Katrina Bryan and Sam Rabone in Dick Whittington at the Garrick Theatre, Lichfield. For the 2019–20 season he played dame for the first time in England at Northwich Memorial Court in Peter Pan alongside John Altman from EastEnders and Katie McGlynn from Coronation Street.

=== Television ===
Rhys's television work has included thirteen years in the role of Sergeant Glyn James in the BBC Cymru soap opera Pobol y Cwm, Sergeant Tom Swann in the last series of A Mind to Kill (for Fiction Factory/Channel 5) and six series of the Welsh-language version of Mr & Mrs – Sion a Sian for HTV.

Other TV work includes Councilman De'Rossi in DaVinci's Demons (Season 3), Crabtree in Doctor Who (The Idiot's Lantern) BBC Wales, High Hopes BBC Wales, Rocket Man (Coastal/BBC), Diamond Geezer with David Jason (Yorkshire TV), Bomber (Zenith TV), Rhinoceros (Granada Television), Jara (HTV), Tracey Beaker – The Movie, Of Me (BBC), Mortimer's Law (BBC) Nice Girl (BBC – Screen 2), The Welsh In, Shakespeare (BBC), Y Delyn, Cameo (Opus TV), Dihirod Dyfed, Llafur Cariad (Taliseyn), Rough Justice (BBC), Crimewatch: Wanted (BBC), Aladdin (BBC) and the first episode of Bowen A'i Bartner (BBC). Cowbois Ac Injans (Opus TV), Y Pris (Fiction Factory), Ar Y Tracs with Ruth Jones (Tidy Productions), and as Arthur in Stella (Sky 1). He played Enzo in the daytime drama series Pitching In alongside Larry Lamb and Hayley Mills (BBC/LA Productions) and Dorien in S4C's popular 'whodunnit' drama series 35 Awr (Boom Cymru). Recently he joined the madcap children's TV series for S4C's Chwarter Call.

=== Film ===
His film work includes Masterpiece (Burn Hand Films), Goldfish in a Blender and What? (Screengems), Ringfinger (Fiction Factory), Darklands (Lluniau Lliw) and the Hugh Grant film The Englishman Who Went Up a Hill But Came Down a Mountain.

=== Other work ===
As well as his autobiography, Allet Ti Beswch!, he has written four children's books published by Y Lolfa: Hwyl a Joio, Joio Mas Draw, Jyst Joio and Hwyl a Hafoc.

He has also recorded two albums on the Flach label: Ni Allwn Droi Yn Ol (There's No Turning Back) and Y Diddanwr(The Entertainer). He also wrote and performed on the Pobol y Cwm charity single "Ar Y Bla'n", also on the Fflach label.

He can also be seen as Master of Ceremonies at Cardiff Castle's Welsh Banquets as well as hosting "The Taste Of Wales" evenings for Loving Welsh Food. He has also presented many radio shows including the Welsh language radio show Showbusnesan for BBC Radio Cymru.

He has filmed an eight part Internet comedy series for Pitcairn Films called Bernard & Knives where he plays title character Bernard. The whole series can be viewed on YouTube.

Rhys plays PC Crabtree in the popular BBC Three cartoon comedy series The Golden Cobra. The new series of The Golden Cobra can be seen on BBC Three and BBC Wales late September 2026.

== Personal life ==
Rhys lives in Cardiff and has two sons, Cai and Llew.

== Bibliography ==
- Rhys, Ieuan (2013). Allet ti beswch!. Talybont: Y Lolfa. ISBN 9781847717160.
