= Ysgol Llanhari =

Location
- Llanharri (nr Pontyclun), Rhondda Cynon Taf, CF72 9XE; Wales; 51.511°N 3.439°W

Information
- Type: State school
- Motto: Gorau gwaith gwasanaeth ('[Your] best work is to serve') and for 90’s to 00’s Pupils - ‘I’r Gad’
- Established: 1974
- Local authority: Rhondda Cynon Taf
- Chair: Ceri Morgan
- Head: Meinir Thomas
- Gender: Both
- Age: 3 to 18
- Enrolment: 632 (2017)
- Houses: 3
- Colours: Green, Red, Yellow
- Publication: Llanhari
- VLE: edysgu.llanhari.com
- Website: http://www.llanhari.com/

Ysgol Llanhari is a Welsh-medium school for 3-19 year olds situated in the village of Llanharry, Rhondda Cynon Taf, Wales.

== History ==
Llanhari is one of the Welsh medium secondary schools in the area, having opened in 1974. It followed Ysgol Gyfun Rhydfelen in leading the way in Welsh medium education in South Wales. In 1974, the school was located in the county of Mid Glamorgan and had a huge catchment area from Tonteg and Cardiff in the east, all the way to Porthcawl and Maesteg in the west. It became popular very quickly and grew in numbers, becoming oversubscribed. Within a few years, it was decided that South Glamorgan pupils would be educated in their own county and in 1978, Ysgol Gyfun Gymraeg Glantaf opened in Cardiff. On 6 June 2011, it was publicly announced that from 2012 the school would incorporate a primary unit and become a 3-18 school. On 3 September 2012, the Primary Unit was opened and the school was formally designated a 3-18 school with the new name of Ysgol Llanhari.

== Feeder schools ==
Llantrisant, Tonyrefail, Dolau and the primary section of Ysgol Llanhari are the current feeder schools to the secondary department at Llanhari. Before the opening of Ysgol Gyfun Gymraeg Llangynwyd in 2008, the following schools also fed Llanhari with pupils from the county of Bridgend: Ysgol Y Ferch o'r Sger, Ysgol Bro Ogwr, Ysgol Cynwyd Sant and Ysgol Gymraeg Cwm Garw. These pupils are now educated at Llangynwyd, within their own county.

== Headteacher ==
To date, Ysgol Llanhari has been led by six heads. Meinir Thomas was appointed headteacher in September 2022. Until August 2022, Rhian Phillips was the headteacher at the school. She succeeded Meirion Stephens, who was head of Llanhari from January 2008. He was preceded by Anne Morris, who took over in 2003. Prior to this, Peter Griffiths was head from 1989. The original head when the school opened in 1974 was Merfyn Griffiths.

== Exam results ==
In 2012, 75% of pupils attained grades A*-C in all A-Level subjects sat, and 97% were awarded grades A-E in all subjects. At GCSE, 74.2% of all grades awarded were A*-C and 74.6% of students attained the 5 A*-C benchmark.

== Notable former or current pupils ==
- Mererid Hopwood, poet and academic - first woman ever to win the chair at the National Eisteddfod of Wales
- Manon Antoniazzi, Chief Executive and Clerk of the Senedd
- Garnon Davies, actor (Hollyoaks)
- Bethan Ellis Owen, actress (Pobol y Cwm)
- Shelley Rees, actress (Pobol y Cwm)
- Gareth Wyatt, Welsh international rugby player
- Scott Gibbs, Welsh international rugby player
- Guto Harri, former BBC Chief Political Correspondent, Communications Director for the Mayor of London's administration.
- Betsan Powys, journalist, and former head of BBC Radio Cymru
- Rhys Williams, professional athlete, specialising in the 400 m hurdles
- Aled Siôn Davies, Paralympian
- Gemma Hallett, rugby player
- Paul Amos, actor
- Aneurin Barnard, actor
