= Dal: Yma/Nawr =

- Directed by: Marc Evans
- Produced by: Maurice Hunter; Fizzy Oppe; Ed Thomas; Ynyr Williams
- Starring: John Cale; Ioan Gruffudd; Daniel Evans; Rhys Ifans; Matthew Rhys; Siân Phillips; Iola Gregory
- Cinematography: Jimmy Dibling
- Edited by: Mike Hopkins
- Music by: Bedwyr Humphreys; Owen Powell
- Production company: Fiction Factory
- Distributed by: S4C
- Release date: November 2003
- Running time: 74 minutes
- Country: Wales
- Language: Welsh

Dal: Yma/Nawr (English: Still: Here/Now; Welsh pronunciation: [ˈdal ˌəma ˈnau̯r]) is a 2003 Welsh documentary film directed by Marc Evans starring John Cale, Ioan Gruffudd and Rhys Ifans.

== Premise ==
The documentary focuses on the poetic soul of Wales. It explores poetic responses, historical and contemporary, to the issues of social and cultural survival and it celebrates the 2,000-year odyssey through Europe's oldest surviving bardic tradition.

== Cast ==
- John Cale
- Ioan Gruffudd
- Rhys Ifans
- Siân Phillips
- Daniel Evans
- Guto Harri
- Nia Roberts
- Cerys Matthews
- Iola Gregory
- Betsan Llwyd
- Maureen Rhys
