= Bethan Ellis Owen =

Welsh actress

Bethan Ellis Owen (born October 1976 in Bangor, Gwynedd) is a Welsh actress best known for playing the character of Ffion in the long-running Welsh-language soap Pobol y Cwm. She has also starred in the play Anfamol, about a woman deciding to have a child as a single parent, and its 2023 television adaptation for S4C.

== Personal life ==
Ellis Owen is the eldest of two daughters of Welsh writer and actor Wynford Ellis Owen. Bethan and her sister Ruth were pupils at Ysgol Gyfun Llanhari after the family moved to South Wales when they were children.

Her former husband Gareth was an ordained minister, with whom she had two daughters: Begw Non and Efa Grug.

In 2022 she and her partner, actor Jack Quick, had a daughter, Jesi Iris, who was conceived using an egg donation.
