= Harriet Lewis =

Welsh actor and teacher

- Born: April 24, 1911; Trebanos, Neath Port Talbot
- Died: November 24, 1999; Trebanos, Neath Port Talbot
- Occupations: actor, teacher

Harriet Lewis (24 April 1911 – 24 November 1999) was a teacher and actress from Wales, best known for playing Magi 'Post' Mathias on the long-running Welsh-language series Pobol y Cwm.

== Early life ==
Harriet Mary Lewis was born in Trebanos, Pontardawe near Swansea to John Lewis, a steelworker, and Annie, a housewife. In 1939, she was working as a "BBC Artiste" living in Trebanos, Pontardawe with her family.

== Career ==
=== Broadcasting ===
Harriet Lewis was a TV and radio presenter and actor appearing in many Welsh-language programmes, including 'Aur y Plant' (also known as 'The Children's Hour'), 'Y Fatl Fawr', and 'Aelwyd Yr Hendre'. In the series 'Pobol y Cwm', she played the role of Magi 'Post' Mathias, who ran the village Post Office.

She also appeared in English-language programmes, including the original broadcast of 'Under Milk Wood' and 'Hawkmoor'.

=== Education ===
Alongside her career in TV and radio, Harriet Lewis worked as a teacher in the Neath and Pontardawe area. She was appointed headteacher at Cwmnedd Primary School in Glynneath in 1959 and then at the Pontardawe Primary School in 1964, both Welsh-medium schools.

== Personal life ==
Harriet Lewis died at her home in Trebanos aged 88. Her funeral was held privately at her home on 2 December 1999, followed by a public service at Swansea Crematorium at 2pm.
