= Andy Price =

British television and film composer

Andy Price is a British television and film composer. He has scored more than 50 films for television and more than 25 productions for theatres around the country, including the Bristol Old Vic, National Youth Theatre and the RSC.

Price has composed the score for three series of BBC's Robin Hood, Law & Order: UK with Adam Lewis and as of 2020 is scoring Silent Witness.

In 2002, Price became the recipient of the Christopher Whelen Award in recognition of his recent work scoring to picture. He is also a visiting lecturer at the Royal College of Music.

== Selected credits ==
- Law & Order: UK
- Robin Hood
- The Inspector Lynley Mysteries
- David Starkey's Elizabeth
- Hetty Feather
- Belonging

== Awards and nominations ==
- 2000 - BAFTA (Original Television Music)
- 2002 - Christopher Whelan Award - Won
