= Gareth Jewell =

Welsh actor (born 1983)

- Born: 7 June 1983 (age 43); Ammanford, Wales
- Occupation: Actor
- Children: 3

Gareth Jewell (born 7 June 1983) is a Welsh actor.

== Early life and career ==
Gareth Jewell was born on 7 June 1983 in Ammanford, Wales. Before concentrating on his acting career, Jewell held a number of different jobs after getting rejected from RADA as a teenager. In 2009 Jewell portrayed the character of Rob Williams in the BBC Wales drama Crash. This followed with a cameo appearance as a car thief in Welsh language film Patagonia, and a role in the 2010 BBC One drama The Indian Doctor. In 2011 he was cast as Owen, the lead male character in the BBC Wales drama Baker Boys, after attending an audition with co-stars Eve Myles and Matthew Gravelle.

As of 2013, Jewell has been part of the main cast on S4C's school drama Gwaith/Cartref. His storylines have been based on his controversial relationship with Sian Bowen-Harries (Janet Aethwy) and the history of his father's domestic violence.

In 2011 The Western Mail listed him as the 24th sexiest man in Wales.

== Filmography ==
| Year(s) | Title | Role | Notes |
|---|---|---|---|
| 1997–2002 | Pam fi Duw? | Cwcw | Main Role |
| 2009 | Crash | Rob Williams | |
| 2010 | The Indian Doctor | Rhys Stephens | |
| 2010 | Patagonia | Chicos del Valle | |
| 2011 | Merlin | Servant to Helios | Episode: The Hunters Heart |
| 2011 | Doctors | Bobbie Greene | Regular role |
| 2011 | Baker Boys | Owen Price | 2 series |
| 2012 | Alys | Phil | Series 2 |
| 2013–2018 | Gwaith/Cartref | Aled Jenkins | Series 3–9 |
| 2014 | The Devil's Vice | Actor | Main role |
| 2015 | Father Brown | Henry Gibbs | Episode: The Truth in the Wine |
| 2017 | Bang | DCI Carl Roberts | Main role |
| 2017 | Keeping Faith | Gavin John | Also starred in the Welsh version Un Bore Mercher. |
| 2019–present | Pobol y Cwm | Dylan Ellis | Regular role |
