= Cuffs (TV series) =

2015 British TV series

- Genre: Police procedural
- Created by: Julie Gearey
- Starring: Ashley Walters; Jacob Ifan; Peter Sullivan; Amanda Abbington; Shaun Dooley; Paul Ready; Eleanor Matsuura; Alex Carter
- Composer: Walter Mair
- Country of origin: United Kingdom
- Original language: English
- No. of series: 1
- No. of episodes: 8

Production
- Executive producers: Will Gould; Julie Gearey
- Producer: Trevor Hopkins
- Production locations: Brighton, Shoreham-by-Sea and Worthing, England
- Running time: 60 minutes
- Production company: Tiger Aspect Productions

Original release
- Network: BBC One
- Release: 28 October – 16 December 2015

Cuffs is a crime drama series depicting the lives of front-line police officers within Brighton and the surrounding area of Sussex serving within the fictional South Sussex Police service. The series aired on BBC One, with episode one first transmitted on 28 October 2015.

On 17 December 2015, the day after the final episode, the BBC confirmed that the show had been cancelled after one series in order to "create space for new shows". The announcement was criticised by many of the actors and a petition was created in an attempt to encourage the BBC to create another series. Attempts, however, were unsuccessful.

== Synopsis ==
The series focuses on the personal lives of the characters, against a backdrop of typical incidents faced by modern front-line police officers and more comedic ones such as hooligans harassing naturists on a nudist beach and reports of 'dog-napping' in a middle-class neighbourhood. The eight-part series was the first police-based drama to be broadcast by the channel since the Holby City spin-off HolbyBlue was aired in 2007, and it shared the same eight o'clock slot.

== Principal cast ==
=== Main characters ===
- Ashley Walters as PC Ryan Draper – Jake's partner and Tutor Constable. He is a widower and father of a son and daughter.
- Jacob Ifan as PC Jake Vickers – the son of Chief Superintendent Robert Vickers. He is gay and is struggling as a new recruit.
- Amanda Abbington as DS Jo Moffat – an investigator who is having an affair with Robert. She is divorced and lives alone with her ageing German Shepherd.
- Peter Sullivan as Chief Superintendent Robert Vickers – Jake's father. His wife is suffering from cancer.
- Shaun Dooley as DC Carl Hawkins – a junior investigator originally from Yorkshire. He is married with children and trying for another with his wife.
- Paul Ready as DI Felix Kane – a mysterious and stoic senior investigator with a troubled personal life.
- Alex Carter as PC Lino Moretti – an out-of-shape cop who is proud of his Italian heritage. He is Donna's partner.
- Eleanor Matsuura as PC Donna Prager – Lino's partner, and an authorised Taser officer.

=== Supporting characters ===
- Karen Bryson as Custody Sgt Melanie Pyke
- Bhavna Limbachia as PC Misha Baig – a Muslim police officer stationed at Brighton Central police station.
- Robbie Gee as Inspector Graham Webb, the duty inspector at Brighton Central police station.
- Andrew Hawley as Simon Reddington – a lawyer and the duty solicitor at Brighton Central police station who has an attraction to Jake.
- Clare Burt as Debbie Vickers – Robert's wife and Jake's mother who is fighting cancer.
- Pippa Nixon as Alice Gove – Donna's wife, an artist.

== Episodes ==
No.	Title	Directed by	Written by	Original release date	US viewers (millions)
1	"Luck of the Draw"	Anthony Philipson	Julie Gearey	28 October 2015	5.50
On his first day working with Ryan, rookie cop Jake faces a challenging shift on the Brighton streets. But, being the boss's son, Jake's biggest challenge is earning the respect of his new colleagues.
2	"A Shock to the System"	Anthony Philipson	Julie Gearey	4 November 2015	4.67
Jake is humiliated when he makes a spectacular rookie error on Brighton Pier. Meanwhile, an eccentric drug dealer is finally in Jo's sights and Carl tries his best to be home early for his family tonight.
3	"Boys Will Be Boys"	Kieron Hawkes	Julie Gearey	11 November 2015	4.45
Carl and Felix investigate a spate of muggings on public schoolboys. Meanwhile, Jo investigates a distressing case that brings Jake and Ryan to blows.
4	"Shakedowns and Stakeouts"	Kieron Hawkes	Joe Barton	18 November 2015	4.49
CID investigate a drugs death, which leads to Ryan and Jake becoming involved in a stakeout for Carl and Felix. Meanwhile, Vickers spends the night with Jo.
5	"Another Dysfunctional Family"	Nick Rowland	Julie Gearey	25 November 2015	Under 4.01
Felix investigates a kidnapping case of a disabled wife of a bank manager. Jo isn't coping well with Robert's rejection and turns to Carl. Jake struggles to forgive his father.
6	"Cupid's Arrow"	Nick Rowland	Nancy Harris	2 December 2015	Under 3.98
Following revelations about his son, Ryan loses his temper. Carl's personal life threatens a high-stakes case, and a runaway iguana plays cupid for Lino.
7	"Drastic Action"	Bill Eagles	Julie Gearey	9 December 2015	Under 3.89
When she's held at gunpoint, Donna's quick thinking saves the day but has personal ramifications. And as Felix and Carl investigate the disappearance of a teenager, Carl gets a disturbing insight into his boss's life.
8	"Bringing a Knife to a Gunfight"	Bill Eagles	Julie Gearey	16 December 2015	Under 3.96
An ex-squaddie suffering from PTSD loses his grip on reality and endangers the team. As Jake realises he can't trust his lawyer boyfriend, Robert is forced to confront the consequences of his marital betrayal.

== Broadcast ==
Internationally, the series premiered in New Zealand on TV One in January 2016. ABC in Australia later began airing the show in February 2016.

In 2025, Netflix released the series on its platform, gaining significant popularity and calls for the show to be given another season.
