= Arwyn Davies =

Welsh actor

Arwyn Davies (born 8 April 1967) is a Welsh actor, best known for playing the character of Mark Jones since 1993 on the long-running Welsh-language soap Pobol y Cwm. Arwyn Davies's father was the Welsh comedian, actor, musician, singer, and composer Ryan Davies, who died when Arwyn was nine years old.

Davies was nominated for a BAFTA Cymru 'Best Actor' award in 1996.

In an episode of the 2019 S4C series, Adre, Nia Parry was shown around Davies' Cardiff home and recording studio.
