= Siw Hughes =

Welsh actress and television presenter

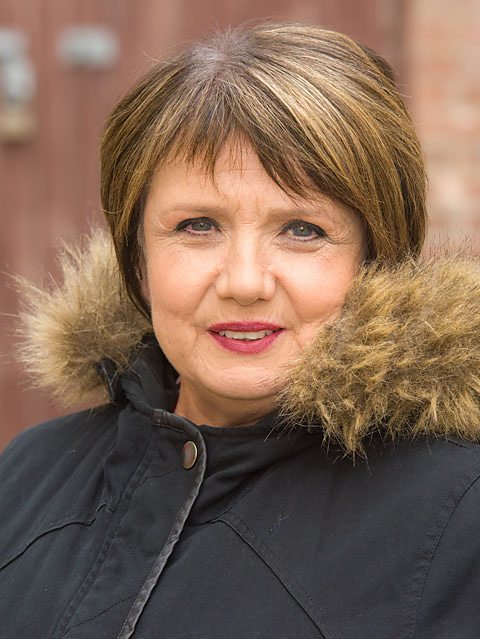
- Hughes in character as Kath Jones from the Welsh soap opera Pobol y Cwm
- Born: 16 January 1958 (age 68); Bangor, Gwynedd, Wales
- Education: Ysgol Gyfun Llangefni
- Occupations: Actress; television presenter
- Years active: 1982–present
- Employer: BBC
- Television: Pobol y Cwm; Gwaith Cartref

Siw Hughes (born 16 January 1958) is a Welsh actress. She is best known for her role as Kath Jones in the long-running S4C soap opera, Pobol y Cwm, from 1993 to 2007, 2014 and 2017 onwards.

== Early life ==
Hughes was born in Bangor, Gwynedd. She has appeared in Welsh-language theatre productions, and in 2014 won a BAFTA Cymru award for Best Actress in a Television Drama, for her role in the S4C series Gwaith/Cartref.

== Career ==
Welsh comedian Iwan John has a running joke in which he spoofs the Kath Jones character, using such overemphasised catch-phrases as "Blincin fflip!" a "Iyffach gols!".
