= Alys (TV series) =

Welsh television series

- Title card for series two
- Genre: Drama
- Created by: Siwan Jones
- Written by: Siwan Jones
- Directed by: Gareth Bryn; Lee Haven-Jones; Rhys Powys; Dylan Richards
- Starring: Sara Lloyd-Gregory; Zachary Mutyambizi; William Thomas; Aneirin Hughes; Gillian Elisa; Ifan Huw Dafydd; Shelley Rees; Kate Jarman; Aled Pugh; Rhys ap William; Carwyn Glyn; Catrin Mai Huw; Delyth Wyn; Gareth Nash; Richard Harrington; Paul Morgans; Carys Eleri; Gareth Jewell
- Composer: Strange Village
- Country of origin: United Kingdom (Wales)
- Original languages: Welsh (main language); English (partly spoken)
- No. of series: 2
- No. of episodes: 16 (list of episodes)

Production
- Executive producer: Jon Williams
- Producer: Paul Jones
- Production location: Barry, Vale of Glamorgan • Brecon • Cardiff
- Editor: Dafydd Hunt
- Camera setup: HD video (film look); Single-camera setup
- Running time: 50–55 minutes
- Production company: Apollo

Original release
- Network: S4C
- Release: 23 January 2011 – 30 December 2012

Alys is a Welsh-language television drama series, created by BAFTA Award-winning scriptwriter Siwan Jones and produced by Apollo and Boom Cymru. It was broadcast on Welsh-language television channel S4C from 23 January 2011 to 30 December 2012, lasting two series. The leading protagonist of the series is portrayed by Sara Lloyd-Gregory, in a role which was specially written for her. Supporting cast include William Thomas, Aneirin Hughes, Gillian Elisa, Shelley Rees, and Kate Jarman. The story revolves around a young woman who flees Cardiff, with her 10-year-old son, trying to escape her troubled past, while her dark secrets eventually begin to surface.

The programme was well received by audiences and attracted high viewing figures for S4C, notably during the first series. It has since been nominated for numerous awards; in 2012 and 2014 it was nominated for Best Drama Series at the Celtic Media Festival, while in 2013, it received a total of eight nominations at the BAFTA Cymru Awards, winning three, including Sara-Lloyd Gregory receiving the award for Best Actress.

== Premise ==
The story of the series is centred around the character Alys as she moves to a small town in West Wales with her 10-year-old son Daniel after fleeing her troubled life in Cardiff; she plans to start a new life and does anything she can to make ends meet and that Daniel is looked after. This includes criminal activity, such as stealing and prostitution. Her son has a dream of one day moving to America and becoming an astronaut and Alys will see that his dream is fulfilled. In her new surroundings, she is met with hostility from several of the middle-class locals, as she is judged for her background. However, she manages to make friends and is accepted by certain people within the area.

== Production ==
=== Development ===
Alys was created and written by Siwan Jones, whose work as a writer earned her a BAFTA Cymru Award and a Rose d'Or for her critically acclaimed television series Tair Chwaer and Con Passionate.

The idea for Alys came to Jones while she was shopping in a small West Wales town. She watched as a group of people carried some furniture as she walked from the car park towards the town. Behind them was a dark tunnel which led into the heart of a building; while they were walking, some children followed along and as she watched on, this triggered the image for the series with became Alys. Jones' idea which started there was to create two worlds; one of working-class people such as the shop owners in a small town; and the others who were unemployed and struggled to make ends meet, such as Sara Lloyd-Gregory's character, 'Alys'. She aimed to show how different these two worlds are and yet how similar they also are.

"I didn’t know at first it had been created for me but it was my first lead role and it was such an honour to have this role created for me by Siwan."

— Sara Lloyd-Gregory interview for South Wales Guardian.

=== Casting ===
The role of the main protagonist, Alys was written especially for actress Sara Lloyd-Gregory, providing her the opportunity to play in her first leading role. She had met Jones in 2009 and had collaborated with her in the third and final series of Con Passionate, and was initially in mind to play the leading role in Jones' then-upcoming new drama series, Alys. Gregory admitted that, to her knowledge, she did not know that the leading role was written for her, which was a good thing, as she still had to audition and would have probably felt more pressure. This was also Gregory's first bilingual role. William Thomas, was chosen to play the part of Wiliam, the alcoholic ex-minister, and Aneirin Hughes received the role of Toms, both of whom Gregory had appeared alongside on Con Passionate. 23-year-old Rhuddlan-born actress Catrin Mai Hue was chosen for the role of Ceri, an 18-year-old woman with a bleak outlook on life. Hue admitted that she was a "huge fan of [Jones]" and she was thrilled to have been given the chance to work on a drama written by Jones. Hue was currently residing in Cardiff when filming the first series. Ifan Huw Dafydd, who also appeared in Jones' Con Passionate, was cast as in the series as Ron, an overweight, financial consultant who hides a disturbing, dark secret. Huw Dafydd was required to wear a fat suit to play the part.

New additions for the second series included Cardiff-based actor Paul Morgans of, who appeared as Dylan, while Carys Eleri was cast as Llio, Dylan's wife. Richard Harrington and Gareth Jewell were also cast in the leading roles of Simon and Phil respectively.

=== Crew ===
Alys was created and entirely written by Siwan Jones. Paul Jones was the producer for the entire run, while Jon Williams served an executive producer. For the first series, Gareth Bryn directed the pilot episode and episode two; with Lee Haven-Jones and Rhys Powys directing subsequent episodes, respectively. Most of series two was directed by Powys. Dylan Richard served a director for one episode, while the remaining episodes were directed by Paul Jones.

=== Filming ===
The first series of Alys commenced production in the summer of 2010, while the second series went into production in March 2012 for Apollo TV. The programme was filmed on location primarily in Cardiff, Brecon, a small town within Powys, and Barry, a seaside town in the Vale of Glamorgan.

Road2Reel, a company which provides vehicles for film, television and advertising purposes, supplied the series for its entirety for stunt work, action and background vehicles. In addition, they provided on-set mechanics, vehicle modification and logistical vehicle movement services.

== Cast and characters ==
=== Main characters ===
Sara Lloyd-Gregory as Alys

- Sara Lloyd-Gregory portrays Alys (Series 1–2). Alys is a strong and independent person. Alys is from West Wales, but moved to Cardiff for university where she became pregnant. She is a young mother who has moved to a small town with her son, Daniel to escape her past in Cardiff, she fled Cardiff following the death of her brother and her boyfriend. With no job and no money, she is given a dirty rundown flat, where she makes some very good friends with her neighbours across the hall, Ceri, Kevin, Shane and Wiliam. She will do just about anything to make sure Daniel eats and has nice things which include stealing and prostitution. Her first "customer" is her landlord, Eirwyn Toms. Alys's plan is to make enough money so that she and Daniel can move to America so that Daniel can one day fulfil his dream of becoming an astronaut. Alys is almost always getting herself into trouble with the rich snobs in the town including clothes shop owner, Debbie, and Daniel's friend Alex's mum, Angie whom Alys seems to be falling for her husband, Chris. Alys is very helpful to her neighbours Ceri and William who have become like her family, she also hates drugs, and it also looks as if her past will sometime come back to haunt her.
- Zachary Mutyambizi portrays Daniel (Series 1–2). Daniel is Alys's young son, he often suffers from the things his mum gets up to, by the things that people say about her, but being young he doesn't really understand. He has a dream of one day becoming an astronaut. He is friends with Alex, Angie and Chris's son.
- William Thomas portrays Wiliam (Series 1–2). Wiliam was once a Minister but is now the town drunk, but he is a good friend to Alys and Ceri. His family don't want anything to do with him because of his drinking which is an embarrassment to them, his ex-wife, Lizabeth, and daughter, Catrin never want to see him, but Catrin really misses him. His nephew, Iestyn often comes to visit him at the flat, but with William's behaviour, he doesn't know why he even bothers.
- Aneirin Hughes portrays Eirwyn Toms (Series 1–2). Known as "Toms", he owns a garage and is the landlord of the flats. He is in serious debt and things in his and his wife, Heulwen's home are often repossessed, but he somehow manages to keep things afloat with the help of town mayor, Ron. Toms has gone to Alys for sex in order to pay for it and afterwards regrets it. The people of the town have been on to their secret affair. With the police often on his back, he once tried to commit suicide by drowning himself. After the death of their daughter, Toms and Heulwen seem to have grown apart, but he seems to be falling in love with Ron's wife Debbie, who is also having problems with her husband.
- Gillian Elisa portrays Heulwen Toms (Series 1–2). Heulwen (real name, Mary) is Toms' wife, who is mostly always seen in a depressed mood, after the death of their daughter Sarah and the fact that Toms is in a lot of debt. She is known as "Mrs T" by the town's people. She visits her sister whom she hasn't seen in twenty years as she is embarrassed by her working-class family. Her sister is Alys's mother, but having not seen Alys since she was a child, she is unaware that it's the same Alys who lives in her town.
- Ifan Huw Dafydd portrays Ron (Series 1–2). Ron is the town mayor, he is married to clothes shop owner, Debbie. He and Debbie often hold dinner party's at their home for Toms, Heulwen, Angie and Chris. Ron and Debbie were having little problems in their marriage for a while, but recently Debbie has discovers that Ron has pictures of young girls on his laptop, which has been stolen which Toms is in on.
- Shelley Rees portrays Debbie (Series 1–2). Debbie is the nosy clothes shop owner who is married to the town mayor, Ron. She is often bullied by her husband and is unable to stand up to him. She has a little dog called Toots who is like a child to her. She has spotted Toms entering and leaving the flats while visiting Alys on various occasions but has kept it from Heulwen. The discovery of the pictures on Ron's laptop has put a strain on their marriage and finds herself turning to Toms for comfort. With the theft of Ron's laptop and the murder of Toots, she begins to feel the pressure.
- Kate Jarman portrays Angie (Series 1–2) Angie owns a restaurant in town, in which she and her husband, Chris try to get up and running. Her son, Alex is Daniel's friend from school, which Angie has treated badly at times for Alys's behaviours. Angie has told Alys that it isn't fair on Daniel by the things she gets up to. Angie and Chris have talked about Alys in the past about her being a prostitute. Angie is now beginning to suspect that something is going on between Chris and Alys.
- Rhys ap William portrays Chris (Series 1–2). Chris is Angie's husband, he often doesn't agree with or like the thing his wife comes out with, especially towards Alys. He and Angie have discussed Alys being on the game and Chris has confronted Alys because of this, he has also been worried about Daniel because of the way Alys behaves, like the time he found Daniel home alone while Kevin was supposed to be watching him. Recently he has been falling for Alys, and Daniel has spotted him and his mum kissing, and they have also slept together.
- Aled Pugh portrays Kevin (Series 1–2). Kevin is Ceri's boyfriend, the brother of Shane and the son of Bessie. He has cheated on Ceri with Vicky and has a child with her, but he is still in love with Ceri. He and Shane discovered a headless body at the local Chinese and has become involved in crime-related businesses. He and Shane recently stole a laptop from Ron and is demanding a ransom for giving the laptop to Toms.
- Carwyn Glyn portrays Shane (Series 1–2). Shane is Kevin's younger brother and son of Bessie. He works with his brother, and after the discovery of the body in the Chinese he sent the message to Toms and was later arrested. He likes Ceri, so he hated the fact that Kevin cheated on her with Vicky.
- Catrin Mai-Huw portrays Ceri Richards (Series 1). Ceri is a depressed young woman, she lives across the hall from Alys, who has become her best friend. She is living with her boyfriend Kevin who has been cheating on her with another woman, Vicky whom he has a child with, but Ceri already knows this and hasn't said anything, until one night she snaps and smashes a chair over Kevin. On a night out with Alys, Ceri recognises that their taxi driver is the same man who had raped her in the past and as a result gave birth to a baby boy, so she slits her wrist. Alys helps Ceri get revenge by finding the man and making him pay for what he has done, but he attacks Alys, so she, Ceri and William find him and William smashes his car windows.

Sara Lloyd-Gregory with Carwyn Glyn (Shane, left), Aled Pugh (Kevin, centre) and Catrin Mai Huw (Ceri, right) (series 1)

- Delyth Wyn portrays Bessie (Series 1–2). Bessie is the mother of Kevin and Shane. Her family is always involved in criminal activity, one of her other sons is in prison and when Shane is arrested she is worried the same thing will happen to him. She likes Ceri, and hates that her son, Kevin has cheated on her with Vicky, who has moved across the street from her.
- Richard Harrington portrayed Simon Evans (Series 2). An old school friend of Angie's, who suddenly arrives and takes a sudden, unwelcome interest in Angie.
- Paul Morgans portrays Dylan Hughes (Series 2). Dylan, a teacher moves into Heulwen and Toms house with his wife, Llio, which Heulwen is renting out to them. Dylan tries what he can to get rid of Heulwen as she becomes a bother to him by entering the house and having him believe that her deceased daughter, Sara is living in the house.
- Carys Eleri portrays Llio Hughes (Series 2). Llio, the wife of Dylan is a soon-to-be mother and moves into Heulwen and Toms house. Llio is a good-natured woman who does not agree with Dylan treatment of Heulwen and welcomes her into the house.
- Gareth Jewell portrays Phil (Series 2). Phil is the son of Bessie and the brother of Kevin and Shane, Having recently been released from prison, Phil served time for the murder of his girlfriend. Martin, the brother of his girlfriend is on Phil's back and will do what he can to make him pay. Phil becomes a love interest of Alys.

=== Recurring characters ===
- Gareth Nash portrays Iestyn (Series 1–2). Iestyn is William's nephew, he works in the local library. He often goes to visit William but hates the way William behaves, he has warned Alys to stay away from his uncle because he doesn't want someone like her near him.
- Menna Trussler portrays Moira (Series 1–2). Moira is the local busybody who had worked in Toms service station and currently is the assistant chef to Chris in the restaurant.
- Ri Richards portrays Lorraine (Series 1–2). Alys' mother, who has not seen her daughter in several months as they do not get along. It was recently discovered that Heulwen is her sister.
- Simon Fisher portrays Terry Lewis (Series 1–2). Terry is the local taxi driver, whom Alys and her friends set out to destroy as Terry had previously raped Ceri and got her pregnant.
- Siwan Bowen Davis portrays Dora (Series 1–2). Dora is Ken's girlfriend. She knows that Terry and Ken are not good but is afraid to leave.
- Caradog Rhys portrays Alex (Series 1–2). Alex is the son of Angie and Chris and a friend to Daniel.
- Huw Euron portrays Ken (Series 2). Ken is Terry's brother and Dora's boyfriend.
- Gareth Milton portrays Martin (Series 2). Martin is the brother of Phil's girlfriend, whom Phil had murdered and Martin sets out to get revenge on Phil.

== Episodes ==
Series	Episodes	Originally released	
Series	Episodes	First released	Last released
1	8	23 January 2011	13 March 2011
2	8	11 November 2012	30 December 2012

=== Series One ===
Alys, a young mother arrives at a small town in West Wales, having escaped her troubled past in Cardiff, involving the death of her brother from a drug overdose and her boyfriend who died in a car accident. She is determined to see that her ten-year-old son, Daniel is well provided for. Daniel has a dream of one day moving to America to become an astronaut and Alys will stop at nothing to see that his dream comes true. Upon her arrival, she moves into a flat rented from Eirwyn Toms, owner of a local garage. Alys will do all that she can to make ends meet; including robbery, blackmail and prostitution, with Toms becoming a regular client. Within the building where Alys lives, she makes several new friends with her neighbours; brothers Kevin and Shane and Kevin's girlfriend, Ceri, a troubled young woman who was raped and got pregnant by her attacker. Alys forms a close friendship with Wiliam, an ex-minister and alcoholic who lives upstairs, while their friendship is frowned upon by Wiliam's nephew, Iestyn. Several people in the area do not exactly take a liking to Alys, this includes Toms' wife, Heuwen who refers to Alys a "trailer trash" and especially Angie, the wife of local chef, Chris, whom Alys begins an illicit affair with. Angie becomes aware of the affair and informs Alys that it is not the first time he has played away. Debbie, the owner of the lingerie shop below the flats discovers that Alys has stolen several items from her shop. When Debbie's husband, the town mayor, Ron offers Alys and Ceri a job cleaning his home, Debbie warns Alys to stay away. Debbie soon makes a shocking discovery when she uncovers Ron's secret – his laptop contains pictures of young girls and that Toms and Ron are both in on it. Alys comes to realise that she has more to worry about than what the town thinks of her; she and Wiliam track down the taxi driver, Terry, who raped Ceri and they are determined to make him suffer. However, Alys is unprepared for him when he later attacks her. Not only does she have problems with Terry, it is later revealed that Heulwen is her aunt, her mother's sister, and when Ron's house is robbed, Alys becomes in possession of his laptop and discovers the pictures. She holds onto the laptop and demands a ransom. She is viciously assaulted by Toms and later, two thugs whom Ron has sent to take care of her and retrieve the laptop which is now missing. When the thugs arrive to find that Alys is not there, they attack Wiliam leaving him for dead. While Wiliam is in hospital she reveals that she caused her boyfriend's car accident and later without her knowledge, Wiliam is discharged from hospital and is threatened by Iestyn to stay away from him. Ceri plans to attend the funeral of a teenage girl who was recently raped and murdered and when she arrives at the girl's home she finds it empty with only Terry inside. Meanwhile, Toms has a deceitful plan to burn down the garage to collect the insurance and enlists the help of Shane to do the deed. While Alys and Daniel lay on the floor of Wiliam's empty flat, Daniel reveals that he had the missing laptop all along and had it hidden for safe-keeping, much to her relief. Soon they hear an explosion in the distance and see that Toms' garage is on fire.

=== Series Two ===
The second series features more of a supernatural subplot. Alys, now having discovered that the laptop was hidden by Daniel, confronts Debbie and blackmails her into giving her cash in exchange for the laptop. Following the explosion at the garage, Shane demands money from Toms for committing his deed. Ceri's body is dumped in a nearby stream. Twelve months pass; the whereabouts of Wiliam are still unknown until he suddenly arrives and moves in with Alys. Alys has moved into a house opposite Bessie, Kevin and Shane and they are unaware of her deceit in concealing that she returned the laptop for a large sum of money and is worried that she may be discovered once Debbie and Ron return from a holiday in Spain. Alys is determined to uncover the truth behind Ceri's murder and is aware that Terry, the taxi driver is behind it and is going to make him pay. Meanwhile, Heulwen, unable to pay the mortgage on her home, following Toms' bankruptcy and his breakdown, is forced to live in a caravan in her back garden, while receiving frequent visits from Alys, whom she has revealed to be her aunt. A young couple, Dylan and his pregnant wife, Llio decide to rent the unoccupied home, while Dylan is not pleased that Heulwen is living in the garden. Llio believes that a supernatural entity is within the house when unexplainable things begin to happen. Dylan is not convinced of this. However, Heulwen reveals that it may be the ghost of her deceased daughter, Sara. Chris becomes jealous when Simon, an old school friend of Angie's moves to the area, and becomes convinced that Simon is obsessed with her. Bessie's son, Phil arrives, having been recently released from prison for murdering his girlfriend; he begins to fall for Alys, and while the feeling is mutual, she suddenly begins to have doubts when Martin, the brother of Phil's deceased girlfriend appears and begins to torment him, forcing Alys to make a difficult decision as to whether she can trust Phil.

== Broadcast history ==
Alys premiered on Welsh-language channel S4C on 23 January 2011, available with English subtitles. It aired on Sundays at 9.00pm with the episodes repeated Thursdays at 10.00pm. Series 1 consisted of eight episodes and concluded on 13 March 2011. However, television drama fans were given the chance to preview the first episode days before it was aired on TV. The previews took place in Llandeilo's Civic Hall on Monday 17 January at 7.30pm, Bangor University's JP Hall on Tuesday 18 January, and Theatr Brycheiniog in Brecon on Friday 21 January. Following the screening, the audience discussed the show and asked questions to the panel connected with the series, including Siwan Jones, Sara Lloyd-Gregory and producer Paul Jones.

The second series of Alys premiered on S4C on Sunday 11 November 2012 at 9.00pm, with repeated episodes airing from Wednesday 14 November 2012 at 10.00pm. This series included eight episodes, concluding on Sunday 30 December 2012.

The show was broadcast in high-definition on Welsh freeview channel S4C Clirlun, which was available only in Wales. However, this operation ceased and the final five episodes of series 2 could only be screened in standard-definition on the original channel as S4C Clirlun closed on 1 December 2012.

As of 2019, the series has not been repeated on S4C, nor is it available on home media.

Both series were made available to watch online in the UK after the television broadcast, on VOD service S4C Clic, for 35 days only. on 29 April 2019, series 1 was made available for streaming on the Clic service (UK only) - for the first time since the original screening. It expired on 26 September 2019. On 16 October 2019, series 2 became available to stream on Clic.

== Future ==
A third series of Alys has not been commissioned. Although it may not have officially been cancelled, it is currently unknown if the series will return, despite the fact that viewers were left with an unresolved cliffhanger. In a 2013 interview with the Wales Arts Review, Sara Lloyd-Gregory commented: "At the moment, there isn’t talk of another series of Alys. We had the best time with both series and the BAFTA is definitely the icing on the cake for me, to finish with such a high level of recognition is more than enough. Never say never, though. It would be nice to release the Alys part of me again, who knows!".

== Reception ==
=== Ratings ===
Series 1
No.	Title	Air date	Ratings (Wales only)		Additional ratings		Total viewers (UK)	Ref(s)
No.	Title	Air date	Viewers	Rank	Viewers	Rank	Total viewers (UK)	Ref(s)
1	Pennod 1	23 January 2011	61,000	7	22,000	3	83,000	
2	Pennod 2	30 January 2011	53,000	9	15,000	1	68,000	
3	Pennod 3	6 February 2011	71,000	6	19,000	2	90,000	
4	Pennod 4	13 February 2011	65,000	6	26,000	2	91,000	
5	Pennod 5	20 February 2011	49,000	11	42,000	2	92,000	
6	Pennod 6	27 February 2011	42,000	14	19,000	5	61,000	
7	Pennod 7	6 March 2011	49,000	10	12,000	6	61,000	
8	Pennod 8	13 March 2011	42,000	10	27,000	2	69,000	

Series 2
No.	Title	Air date	Ratings (Wales only)		Additional ratings		Total viewers (UK)	Ref(s)
No.	Title	Air date	Viewers	Rank	Viewers	Rank	Total viewers (UK)	Ref(s)
1	Pennod 1	11 November 2012	44,000	8	6,000	5	50,000	
2	Pennod 2	18 November 2012	39,000	12	21,000	5	60,000	
3	Pennod 3	25 November 2012	39,000	10	4,000	5	43,000	
4	Pennod 4	2 December 2012	37,000	15	3,000	10	40,000	
5	Pennod 5	9 December 2012	35,000	10	Not available		35,000	
6	Pennod 6	16 December 2012	27,000	20	19,000	5	46,000	
7	Pennod 7	23 December 2012	33,000	17	Not available		33,000	
8	Pennod 8	30 December 2012	37,000	13	7,000	5	44,000	

=== Accolades ===
Year	Association	Category	Recipient(s)	Result	Ref(s)
2012	BAFTA Cymru	Production Design	Gerwyn Lloyd (episode 1)	Won	
2012	BAFTA Cymru	Photography & Lighting	Rich Wyn (episode 1)	Nominated	
2012	BAFTA Cymru	Original Music	Strange Village (episode 2)	Nominated	
2012	BAFTA Cymru	Writer	Siwan Jones (episode 8)	Nominated	
2012	BAFTA Cymru	Director: Fiction	Gareth Bryn (episode 2)	Nominated	
2012	Celtic Media Festival	Bronze Torc Award for Best Drama Series	Alys (series 1)	Nominated	
2013	BAFTA Cymru	Photography & Lighting	Rich Wyn (series 2)	Won	
2013	BAFTA Cymru	Writer	Siwan Jones (series 2)	Nominated	
2013	BAFTA Cymru	Actress	Sara Lloyd-Gregory (series 2)	Won	
2014	Celtic Media Festival	Bronze Torc Award for Best Drama Series	Alys (series 2)	Nominated	

== Opening titles ==
Series one title card

The opening title used for the first series of Alys was basically a simple title and music played of about five seconds, as there were no traditional opening titles that included cast names. The theme tune for the series was used over the opening. Although it could be heard in full over the end credits. In the first episode, the title appeared before the opening scene. All subsequent episodes included a recap at the beginning of each episode just before the title.

For the second series, a more contemporary version of the opening title was used and again of just five seconds with the theme much played. The title font was changed and below it saying "gan Siwan Jones" (from Siwan Jones). For the first episode of series two, an extended recap of events from series one was shown just before the opening title. Following the title, the events from the final episode of series one were seen in a flashback mixed with the opening scene. Following this episode, the opening title was now shown before the recap. The recap sequence for series two was screened in a 2.35:1 ratio and the theme music was also changed slightly.

== See also ==
- List of Welsh television series
