= A Mind to Kill =

- Also known as: Yr Heliwr
- Genre: Crime drama
- Created by: Sion Eirian; Lyn Ebenezer
- Written by: David Joss Buckley; Jeff Dodds
- Directed by: Peter Edwards; Philip John
- Starring: Philip Madoc; Ffion Wilkins; Sharon Morgan; Bryn Fôn; Ieuan Rhys; Huw Llyr; Elen Bowman; Geraint Lewis; Gillian Elisa
- Theme music composer: Mark Thomas [Series 1, Series 2, special] / John E. R. Hardy [Series 3, Series 4 - final 7 eps]
- Opening theme: Mark Thomas [Series 1, Series 2] / John E. R. Hardy [Series 3, Series 4 - final 7 eps]
- Ending theme: Mark Thomas [Series 1, Series 2] / John E. R. Hardy [Series 3, Series 4 - final 7 eps]
- Composer: Mark Thomas [Series 1, Series 2] / John E. R. Hardy [Series 3, Series 4 - final 7 eps]
- Country of origin: United Kingdom
- Original languages: Welsh; English
- No. of series: 4 + Christmas special
- No. of episodes: 22

Production
- Executive producers: Brian Harris; Dafydd Huw Williams
- Producers: Mike Parker; Peter Edwards
- Production locations: Aberystwyth; Ceredigion
- Cinematography: Peter Thornton
- Editor: John Gillanders
- Running time: 120 minutes
- Production companies: Lluniau Lliw; 4L Productions

Original release
- Network: S4C; ITV/HTV (pilot); Channel 5 (series)
- Release: 14 December 1991 – 6 September 2002

A Mind to Kill is a Welsh television police detective series, that developed from a feature-length film first broadcast in 1991. The series stars Philip Madoc as protagonist DCI Noel Bain. Four series were broadcast between 1994 and 2002, though the Christmas special is sometimes counted as a separate series, bringing the total to five. The show first aired as Yr Heliwr on S4C, before being broadcast on Channel 5 in the UK.

The series was filmed in both English and in Welsh, with each scene being shot first in one language and then in the other. The series has since been dubbed into more than a dozen languages and shown all over the world. The series is set in South Wales, and features a variety of post-industrial, rural, urban and seaside landscapes. The pilot episode was filmed in the Aberystwyth area. All twenty-two episodes are available on DVD.

== Synopsis ==
Philip Madoc plays Detective Chief Inspector Noel Bain, a man who looks back fondly to the days when policing involved chasing villains, playing rugby and drinking beer. However, he has come to realise that contemporary policing imposes dilemmas that no training manual could ever anticipate. He is a man out of time and seeks to protect the old way of life, and what he believes are important traditional values. Bain is a widower who has a tempestuous relationship with his daughter, Hannah.

Despite resenting the lack of time her father spent with the family because of police work, Hannah becomes a WPC on the same police force. Bain often sees his position as not just a job; but his raison d'être; meaning that his journey is often an emotional and painful one as the personal and professional universes collide. Bain has a close friendship with police pathologist Professor Margaret Edwards (Sharon Morgan), but his true feelings for her remain ambiguous.

Other regular actors included Gillian Elisa, Meic Povey and Geraint Lewis. Joining the regulars in the last series were Bryn Fôn, Ieuan Rhys, Huw Llyr and Elen Bowman. The series featured many guest spots from well known actors such as Margaret John, Ioan Gruffudd, Sue Jones-Davies, David Warner, Mark Lewis Jones, John Rhys-Davies, David Lyn, Archie Panjabi and Siân Phillips.

== Reception ==
The Windsor Public Library stated that the series drew upon "Intricate plots, strongly drawn characters, and gritty authenticity", making it a "riveting Welsh drama series". Eclipse Magazine said of the series; "A Mind To Kill is a dark and twisty show... CSI's ancestor. Murder is the most extreme human action and stories sometimes play out against the most extraordinary of circumstances, e.g. a Miners' Strike, when the traditional way of life of the community is already under threat."

They continued by stating that; "There is a strong psychological element, and as the series proceeds, the stories begin to dig deeper into Bain’s subconscious. The unresolved death of his wife causes great mental anguish and torment, and his dealings with the people he meets and the crimes he investigates are not always as straightforward as they should be."

== Episodes ==
=== Series overview ===
Series	Episodes	Originally released	
Series	Episodes	First released	Last released
Film	1	14 December 1991	
1	6	13 November 1994	29 January 1995
2	7	30 August 1997	22 November 1997
Special	1	29 December 1998	
3	3	24 March 2001	26 May 2001
4	4	16 August 2002	6 September 2002

=== TV Film (1991) Lluniau Lliw Cyf/Yorkshire International Films for S4C ===
No.	Title	Directed by	Written by	British air date
1	"A Mind to Kill"	Peter Edwards	Lyn Ebenezer & Sion Eirian	14 December 1991
A young girl is found brutally murdered in a small seaside town. The police are baffled; the town's inhabitants are panic-stricken. A serial killer is on the loose, and as yet more horrific murders take place, the search for clues becomes a desperate race against time.

=== Series 1 (1994—1995) Produced in 1994 S4C presents a Lluniau Lliw Cyf Production ===
No.	Title	Directed by	Written by	British air date
1	"Black Silence"	Peter Edwards	David Joss Buckley	13 November 1994
During a strike at the local coal mine, Bain investigates the murder of a 17-year-old prostitute. He suspects that the powerful, intimidating strike leader Roderick Tate is involved, but the evidence points to another man.
2	"White Rocks"	Edward Thomas	David Joss Buckley	27 November 1994
A young mother is beaten to death at a run-down holiday camp, and her 7-year-old son - who may have witnessed the crime - disappears. Racing against time to find the boy before the murderer does, Bain uncovers secrets worth killing for.
3	"Gameboys"	Peter Edwards	David Joss Buckley	11 December 1994
When the charred body of a young man is found in a peaceful farming community, Bain's investigation leads to a series of shocking discoveries: drugs, rent boys, and a town elder who's not as respectable as he seems.
4	"Rest Not Secure"	Edward Thomas	David Joss Buckley	1 January 1995
A gang war is brewing, but Bain is preoccupied with troubles at home: his teenage daughter, Hannah, has moved out, resentful of his job as a policeman. When Bain retreats to a remote cabin for some privacy, he is taken hostage by an escaped prisoner bent on revenge.
5	"Son of His Works"	Hugh Thomas	Wil Roberts	15 January 1995
A gruesome killing in the woods links a secretive religious cult to a troubled urban neighbourhood and a heroin dealer to a prominent married judge and his lover. Bain must untangle a web of clues to learn the truth behind the murder and expose a fraud.
6	"Rachel Hardcastle"	Peter Edwards	David Joss Buckley	29 January 1995
Bain is flattered by the romantic attentions of Rachel Hardcastle, a successful concert pianist and sophisticated, attractive woman. Then her husband turns up dead, and Bain becomes the prime suspect in his murder.

=== Series 2 (1997) Produced in 1995-1996 S4C presents a Lluniau Lliw Cyf Production ===
No.	Title	Directed by	Written by	British air date
1	"Bloodline"	Peter Edwards	David Joss Buckley	30 August 1997
What looks like a suicide pact between brothers gets complicated when another body is found. Bain uncovers a family saga of blackmail, abuse, and revenge and also copes with disturbing news from his daughter, Hannah.
2	"Death Watch"	Gwennan Sage	Peter Lloyd	18 October 1997
When the charred remains of a body are found inside a burned-out car, Bain travels to a town where vigilante justice prevails. Despite the locals' disrespect, he attempts to unravel an unsettling chain of events that led to murder.
3	"Game Plan"	Ceri Sherlock	Tony Holland and John Maynard	25 October 1997
Bain goes undercover at a seedy seaside resort to investigate a young woman's murder. Then Hannah shows up for her own holiday, much to her father's chagrin.
4	"Inheritance"	Edward Thomas	Meic Povey	1 November 1997
A wooded sanctuary in a small rural village has become a battleground between big business and local environmentalists. Investigating a string of violent killings, Bain is caught between two militant and potentially dangerous groups.
5	"Head of the Valleys"	Peter Edwards	David Joss Buckley	8 November 1997
Called in to investigate a five-year-old corpse found beneath a parking lot, Bain suspects a local crime dynasty and their ruthless matriarch. While tracking down leads, he confronts his own attitudes towards wealth and power.
6	"Strange Territory"	Peter Edwards	David Joss Buckley	15 November 1997
When a teenager turns up dead in a Celtic burial ground, the top suspects are her scorned boyfriend and the local psychic who discovered her. Inconsolable with grief, the victim's family decides to take justice into their own hands.
7	"Green Wounds"	Peter Edwards	David Joss Buckley	22 November 1997
Plagued with nightmares about the death of his wife—killed 12 years earlier by a drunk driver—Bain takes a leave of absence to seek revenge against the man who ruined his life.

=== Christmas Special (1998) Lluniau Lliw for HTV and Channel 5 in association with Pearson Television International ===
No.	Title	Directed by	Written by	British air date
1	"Shadow Falls"	Endaf Emlyn	David Joss Buckley	29 December 1998
Investigating a suspicious suicide in a tightly knit community, Bain wants to close the case and go home. Prompted by his daughter, Hannah, he digs deeper, unearthing a dark secret that binds three couples together.

=== Series 3 (2001) Produced in 1999-2000 Fiction Factory in association with Barcud Derwen for HTV and 5 ===
No.	Title	Directed by	Written by	British air date
1	"Colour Blind"	Philip John	D.T. Caballo	24 March 2001
The death of a young Pakistani man looks like a hate crime, but is it? Racial tension is the last thing the community needs, and it's up to Bain and his team to keep the situation from escalating into full-scale violence.
2	"Box"	Philip John	David Joss Buckley	19 May 2001
Bain tracks a sexually disturbed killer who holds his victims captive. At the same time, he copes with a new constable at the station: his daughter, Hannah, whose courage and inexperience soon put her in danger.
3	"The Inner Life of Strangers"	Edward Thomas	David Joss Buckley	26 May 2001
When a successful pop singer suddenly retires and comes home to Wales, not everyone applauds her decision. Then two of her closest business associates are murdered, and unless Bain can stop the killer, she may be next.

=== Series 4 (2002) Produced 2000-2001 Fiction Factory in association with Barcud Derwen for S4C and 5 ===
No.	Title	Directed by	Written by	British air date
1	"Blood and Water"	Edward Thomas	David Joss Buckley	16 August 2002
A young pregnant woman is killed by her jealous foster brother. A witness to the crime won't come forward, and the killer's brother is a policeman who covers for him. With this kind of stonewalling, will Bain get his man?
2	"Soundbites"	Tim Lyn	Jeff Dodds	23 August 2002
Abandoned by his ambitious father and left to care for his mentally ill mother, the son of a local politician vows revenge. Bain follows a trail of fire to learn the truth about the family's past.
3	"Engineer"	Dai Evans	Jeff Dodds	30 August 2002
A couple commits a desperate act when their only daughter falls into a coma after a routine surgery. All they want is a public admission of guilt from the surgeon; all Bain wants is to prevent another tragedy.
4	"The Little House in the Forest"	Euros Lyn	David Joss Buckley	6 September 2002
When a 15-year-old girl is found murdered, a pedophile living alone in the forest is easy to blame. But Bain knows that simple answers aren't always the right ones, and he steps in to help a young colleague solve the case.
