= Adam Lewis (composer) =

British composer

Adam Lewis (also known as Mr Ronz) is a self-taught BAFTA winning composer, songwriter and producer, originally from Tonyrefail, South Wales.

As well as scoring TV shows, films and theatre productions Lewis wrote the main theme to Noel Clarke's controversial brit-flick Kidulthood. In 2008 he appeared in Kneehigh Theatre's critically acclaimed version of Brief Encounter in London's West End. Lewis collaborated with Andy Price on all 8 seasons of Law & Order: UK for ITV. He continued his film work on features 4.3.2.1. and The Knot.

In 2010 Lewis was announced as the composer on the 1st series of the BBC Wales production Baker Boys starring Eve Myles, beginning work on series two in 2011. On 30 September 2012 Adam won the BAFTA Cymru award for the music for series one.

He has gone on to write for a wide variety of productions, from E4's The Aliens to three series (21-23) of Silent Witness for the BBC alongside composer Andy Price. He also co-wrote the main theme for hit video game Overcooked!

After releasing an instrumental EP in 2007, he continues working as a songwriter and music producer. As one half of duo Days Are Done (with singer/songwriter Emmy Kay) he's appeared live on BBC Radio 2, Glastonbury Festival and WSM in Nashville.
