= Mark Flanagan (actor) =

Welsh actor

Mark Flanagan is a Welsh television actor best known for playing the character of Jinx in the Welsh soap Pobol y Cwm.
