= Adre (TV series) =

- Genre: Factual entertainment
- Presented by: Nia Parry
- Country of origin: Wales
- Original language: Welsh
- No. of series: 5
- No. of episodes: 41

Production
- Executive producer: Beca Evans
- Producer: Ffion Jones
- Production location: Various
- Running time: 30 minutes (inc. adverts)
- Production company: Boom Cymru

Original release
- Network: S4C; BBC iPlayer
- Release: 16 August 2017 – present

Related
- Through the Keyhole

Adre (English: Home) is a Welsh language television programme, presented by Nia Parry and broadcast on S4C since August 2017.

== Premise ==
In each programme Parry is invited into the home of a well-known Welsh personality, discovering what it tells us about the person's character, background and career. Parry then interviews the personality about their life and history. During production the crew spend two days filming at each house.

== Transmissions ==
Series	Start date	End date	Episodes
1	16 August 2017	28 January 2018	7
2	6 June 2018	22 August 2018	10
Special	24 December 2018		1
3	2 January 2019	13 February 2019	7
4	2 December 2019	20 January 2020	7
Special	23 December 2019		1
5	2 November 2020	28 December 2020	8

== Episodes ==
=== Series 1 (2017−18) ===
Episode	Celebrity homeowner	Original air date
1	Dafydd Iwan	16 August 2017
2	Roy Noble	23 August 2017
3	Angharad Llwyd	30 August 2017
4	Nia Roberts	7 January 2018
5	Sian James	14 January 2018
6	Cefyn Burgess	21 January 2018
7	Llwyd Owen	28 January 2018

=== Series 2 (2018) ===
Episode	Celebrity homeowner	Original air date
1	Bethan Gwanas	6 June 2018
2	Aeron Pughe	13 June 2018
3	Angharad Mair	20 June 2018
4	Aneirin Karadog	27 June 2018
5	Tara Bethan	4 July 2018
6	Morgan Jones	11 July 2018
7	Lowri Evans	18 July 2018
8	Caryl Parry Jones	1 August 2018
9	Tony ac Aloma	15 August 2018
10	Rhys Mwyn	22 August 2018

=== Christmas Special (2018) ===
A Christmas special, Adre Nadolig, was broadcast on 24 December 2018 and visited a number of celebrities to see how they celebrated the festive season.

Episode	Celebrity homeowners	Original air date
1	Cefin Roberts; Dewi 'Pws' Morris; Betty Ann; Keith Jones	24 December 2018

=== Series 3 (2019) ===
Episode	Celebrity homeowner	Original air date
1	Dai Jones	2 January 2019
2	Elliw Gwawr	9 January 2019
3	Aled Hall	16 January 2019
4	Sharon Morgan	23 January 2019
5	Dafydd Wigley and Elinor Bennett	30 January 2019
6	Arwyn Davies	6 February 2019
7	Brynmor Williams	13 February 2019

=== Series 4 (2019−20) ===
Episode	Celebrity homeowner	Original air date
1	Gareth Wyn Jones	2 December 2019
2	Heledd Cynwal	9 December 2019
3	Myrddin ap Dafydd	16 December 2019
4	Mandy Watkins	30 December 2019
5	Iwan Griffiths	6 January 2020
6	Elin Manahan Thomas	13 January 2020
7	Owen Powell	20 January 2020

=== Christmas Special (2019) ===
A Christmas special, Adre Nadolig, was broadcast on 23 December 2019 and visited three people decorating their extravagant houses for the festive period.

Episode	Homeowners	Original air date
1		23 December 2019

=== Series 5 (2020) ===
Episode	Celebrity homeowner	Original air date
1	Carwyn Jones	2 November 2020
2	Anni Llŷn	9 November 2020
3	Robat Arwyn	16 November 2020
4	Lisa Angharad	23 November 2020
5	Manon Steffan Ros	30 November 2020
6	Iwan Gwyn Parry	7 December 2020
7	Barry Morgan	14 December 2020
8	Angharad Mair	28 December 2020
