= Pobol y Cwm =

Welsh-language television soap opera (since 1974)

- Genre: Soap opera
- Created by: Gwenlyn Parry; John Hefin
- Starring: Present cast
- Theme music composer: Endaf Emlyn
- Country of origin: United Kingdom
- Original language: Welsh
- No. of episodes: 8,000

Production
- Executive producer: Branwen Williams
- Producers: Elin Blake; Rhydian Gwyn Lewis
- Production locations: Broadcasting House, Llandaff (1974–2011); Roath Lock, Cardiff (2011–present)
- Running time: 20 minutes (excluding advertisements)
- Production company: BBC Studios Continuing Drama Productions

Original release
- Network: BBC Cymru (1974–1982); S4C (1982–present); BBC iPlayer (2014–present)
- Release: 16 October 1974 – present

Related
- Rownd a Rownd

Pobol y Cwm (People of the Valley; Welsh pronunciation: [ˈpɔbɔl ə ˈkʊm]) is a Welsh-language soap opera produced by the BBC since October 1974. The longest-running television soap opera produced by the BBC, Pobol y Cwm was originally transmitted on BBC Cymru (now BBC One Wales) and later transferred to the Welsh-language station S4C when it opened in November 1982.

The programme typically centres around the residents of Cwmderi – a fictional, Welsh speaking, agricultural community. Its original working title was Pentrefelin.

Apart from rugby and football specials, Pobol y Cwm is consistently one of the most watched programmes of the week on S4C. On 25 September 2019, the soap hit a significant broadcasting landmark when it aired its 8,000th episode. On 16 October 2024, the show celebrated its 50th anniversary with an extended-length episode. In addition, the set was opened to the public with tours available around the studios and the main high street.

== Setting ==
The setting for the show is the fictional village of Cwmderi, located in Gwendraeth Valley, which is between Carmarthen and Llanelli in south-west Wales. Whilst much of the show's early activity took place at a nursing home, storylines are currently centred on the village pub, Y Deri, and its adjacent small businesses and houses. Other frequent settings for storylines include the comprehensive school, Tamed, and a local farm, Penrhewl among many other houses. There are two other fictional villages close to Cwmderi, named Llanarthur and Cwrtmynach.

Originally filmed at Broadcasting House, Cardiff, since 2011 the programme has been filmed at the BBC's drama studios at Roath Lock in Cardiff Bay, other than a few on-location shoots around Cardiff. The exterior outdoor high street of Cwmderi was recreated from scratch, while many interiors are shot inside the Roath Lock Studios. The old set, on the BBC site in Llandaff, was eventually dismantled in 2017.

== Broadcast ==
Three episodes are produced each week, broadcast on S4C at 8pm on Tuesdays, Wednesday and Thursdays and uploaded to BBC iPlayer at 6am the same day. In addition, a weekly omnibus with in-vision English subtitles airs on Sunday evenings.

The show previously aired five episodes a week, which was reduced to four in 2019. On 18 March 2020 it was announced that filming would be suspended in the light of the spread of COVID-19 until further notice. The number of episodes being broadcast would be also be reduced to two per week "so that we can ensure the audience can continue to enjoy Pobol y Cwm in their homes for as long as possible." The episodes were shown on Tuesdays and Thursdays in the usual time slot. In June 2020, it was announced that Pobol y Cwm would go on a transmission break following the broadcast on 16 June 2020. A behind-the-scenes show, Pobol y Cwm: Y Cymeriadau, aired in the show's place during the transmission break. Every episode featured an exclusive interview with the show's cast, with 12 episodes being shown. The soap also aired a repeat of "iconic" episodes from the past.

Five months later, it was confirmed that there were plans for a return to production. When production recommenced, social distancing measures were utilised and the cast were required to do their own hair and make-up, which is normally done by a make-up artist. Filming recommenced on 10 August 2020, with new episodes airing twice a week from 8 September 2020. The show confirmed a new, permanent schedule of three weekly episodes from November 2021 onwards.

=== Outside Wales ===
For a brief period in 1992, the series was broadcast at a 7pm slot on Nederland 3, under the title De vallei (The Valley). The British producers commissioned a promotional tape featuring facets of Welsh culture, preceding the first episode broadcast by the channel on 11 August 1992.

In 1994, it was briefly shown across the rest of the United Kingdom on BBC Two with English subtitles. This networked run started on 10 January 1994, in a daily afternoon slot four times a week from Monday to Thursday for about three months on an "experimental basis". The episodes were nine months behind the Welsh broadcast. The run was preceded by an introductory programme about the series which was aired on 6 January. The final episode to air on BBC Two was broadcast on 15 April.

This had not been the first time it was shown outside of Wales as the programme was shown on BBC1 in England until 1982, ending a few months before the launch of S4C.

== Present characters ==
=== Regular characters ===
| Character | Actor | Years |
|---|---|---|
| Megan Harries (née Owen) | Lisabeth Miles | 1974–1996, 2002–2003, 2011– |
| David 'Dai' Ashurst | Emyr Wyn | 1978–1984, 2001–2020, 2022– |
| Ieuan Griffiths | Iestyn Jones | 1988–1992, 1995–1997, 2000–2011, 2019– |
| Eileen Probert (née Walters) | Sera Cracroft | 1989–1996, 1998, 2007– |
| Hywel Llywelyn | Andrew Teilo | 1990– |
| Cassie Morris (née Nicholas) | Sue Roderick | 1991–2004, 2018– |
| Sioned Rees | Emily Tucker | 1993–1996, 2007– |
| Mark Jones | Arwyn Davies | 1993– |
| Kathleen 'Kath' Jones | Siw Hughes | 1993–2007, 2014, 2017– |
| Rhys Llywelyn | Jack Quick | 1997–2001, 2006–2015, 2018– |
| Diane Ashurst (née Hopkins) | Victoria Plucknett | 1998–2020, 2022– |
| Indeg Griffiths | Jemima Nicholas | 2000–2001, 2010–2011, 2025– |
| Garry Monk | Richard Lynch | 2002– |
| Britt Evans (née Monk) | Donna Edwards | 2002– |
| Iolo White | Dyfan Rees | 2002–2005, 2007, 2009– |
| Siôn White | Jeremi Cockram | 2002– |
| Kelly Evans | Lauren Phillips | 2003–2005, 2007, 2009, 2015– |
| Ffion Llywelyn | Bethan Ellis Owen | 2004– |
| Huw "Jinx" Jenkins | Mark Flanagan | 2005–2015, 2021– |
| Dani Thomas | Elin Harries | 2007– |
| Colin Evans | Jonathan Nefydd | 2008– |
| Lleucu Rossiter | Efa Grug | 2008–2009, 2022, 2024– |
| Gwern Monk | Keogh Kiernan | 2010– |
| Mathew Price | Mark Stuart Roberts | 2016– |
| Howard Owen | Endaf Eynon Davies | 2018–2019, 2021– |
| Brynmor Richards | William Thomas | 2019, 2021– |
| Eleri Beynon | Sara Gregory | 2024– |

=== Recurring and guest characters ===
| Character | Actor(s) | Duration |
|---|---|---|
| Esther Llywelyn | Rosie Ekenna | 2016– |
| Greta Davies-White | Elyssa Stevens | 2017– |
| Huwi-John Probert | Evan Salter | 2018– |
| Gabriel Thomas | Rory Crouch | 2021– |
| Lily Ashurst | Uncredited | 2024– |
| Jac Ashurst | Uncredited | 2024– |
| Morgan Hughes | Tom Blumberg | 2026– |

== See also ==
- List of Welsh television series
