= Matthew Gravelle =

Welsh actor

- Born: Matthew Ian Gravelle; 2 April 1976 (age 50); Porthcawl, Wales
- Occupation: Actor
- Years active: 1999–present
- Spouse: Mali Harries (m. 1999)
- Children: 2

Matthew Ian Gravelle (born 2 April 1976) is a Welsh screen actor.

== Career ==
Gravelle was born in Porthcawl. In 2003, Gravelle appeared in the BBC One drama series Holby City and was a regular in the acclaimed BBC Wales show Belonging for two series. His other TV appearances include Casualty, Caerdydd and Judge John Deed. He appeared in "End of Days", the first series finale of Torchwood, as a medical doctor dealing with cases of the Black Death. He later provided voice acting for the Torchwood Radio Play "The Dead Line" which broadcast on BBC Radio Four in July 2009.

From 2007, he played the lead character of gangster Lyn Edwards in the Welsh-language television series Y Pris, dubbed "'The Sopranos' by the sea". The role earned him a BAFTA Cymru nomination for best actor in 2010.

Gravelle starred in the 2010 film Patagonia and then in the BBC Wales series Baker Boys as Rob, the co-manager of Valley Bara and the fiancée of Sarah (Eve Myles). In 2013, he was cast in the hit ITV crime drama Broadchurch as Joe Miller, husband of Olivia Colman's character. Later that year, he guest-starred in the Welsh detective drama Y Gwyll, in which his real-life wife Mali Harries stars. He also starred with Harries in Keeping Faith/Un Bore Mercher (2017), where they played a married couple. In 2021, Gravelle Played the role of DI Nathan Eason in Manhunt season 2.

== Personal life ==
Gravelle is married to fellow Welsh performer Mali Harries. The couple have played each other's on-screen significant other in several TV shows.

In 2009, The Western Mail listed him as the 24th sexiest man in Wales.

== Filmography ==
=== Film ===
Year	Work	Role	Notes
2007	The Mark of Cain	Chaplain	
2010	Patagonia	Rhys	
2014	Son of God	Thomas	
2025	Mr Burton	Sir Cyril Cooke	

=== Television ===
Year	Show	Role	Notes
1999–2002	Nuts and Bolts	Will	
2000	The Scarlet Pimpernel	Joseph Mallard William Turner	1 episode
2001	Hearts and Bones	Meridith	1 episode
2001–2002	The Bench	Gareth	
2003	Holby City	Dean Shepherd	1 episode
2003–2004	Belonging	Andy Owen	Series 4 & 5
2005–2008	Con Passionate	Eurof	
2005	Love Soup	Paul Gilpin	1 episode
2006	Caerdydd	Gareth Pritchard	2 episodes
2006	Casualty	Phil Radcliffe	1 episode
2007	Torchwood	Doctor	1 episode, "End of Days"
2007	Judge John Deed	Corporal Dewi Jones	2 episodes, "War Crimes" Parts 1 & 2
2007–2009	Y Pris	Lyn Edwards	Nominated – BAFTA Cymru Best Actor
2008	High Hopes	Adam Mosley	1 episode
2009	Collision	DS Anthony Braydon	1 episode
2010	All Shook Up!	Simon Fuller	
2010	Pen Talar	Steffan Watkins	5 episodes
2011	Baker Boys	Rob	5 episodes
2011	The Bible	Thomas	3 episodes
2011–2013	Teulu	Huw Rees	S4C drama
2013	Reit Tu Ôl i Ti	Dewi	S4C drama
2013	Hinterland	Wyn Bratton	Also starred in the Welsh version Y Gwyll
2013–2017	Broadchurch	Joe Miller	18 episodes
2014	35 Diwrnod	Patrica	Series 1 main role
2014	Rosemary's Baby	Howard	1 episode
2016–2018	Byw Celwydd	Harri James	3 series
2016	New Blood	Gwynn Hughes	1 episode
2016	Ordinary Lies	Aaron	1 episode, series 2
2016	Aberfan: The Green Hollow	Narrator	Documentary
2017	Keeping Faith	Terry Price	Main role; Also starred in the Welsh version Un Bore Mercher
2017	The Harbour	Narrator	4 episodes
2018	Doctor Who	Voice of Kerblam	1 episode, "Kerblam!"
2018	Morfydd	Ernest Jones	Main role
2018	Pluen Eira	Clive	TV movie
2019	Code Blue: Murder	Narrator	
2019	The Widow	Joshua Peake	Main role
2019	Carnival Row	Unseelie Jack	Episode: "Some Dark God Wakes"
2019	The Accident	Ben Christie	
2020	The Snow Spider	Ivor Griffiths	Main role
2021	Manhunt	DI Nathan Eason	4 episodes, series 2
2022	Silent Witness	Tom Faulkner	"History" Parts 1 and 2
2022	The Pact	DS Pritchard	
2023	Steeltown Murders	Seb	
2024	Mudtown	Alun Lewis Jones	6 episodes

=== Radio ===
Year	Work	Role	Notes
2009	Torchwood: Asylum	Security guard	BBC Radio 4
2010	The LL Files		BBC Radio Wales
2011	Wedding of the Year		BBC Radio Wales
2012	The Diary of Samuel Pepys	Mr Jervas	BBC Radio 4
2013	Deep Country	Narrator	BBC Radio 4
2015	Ring	Mitchell Hooper	BBC Radio 4
2025	The Archers	Bill Gordon	BBC Radio 4

=== Video games ===
Year	Work	Role	Notes
2013	Ni No Kuni: Wrath of the White Witch	Surly	
2014	Dragon Age: Inquisition	Abelas	
2015	Jaws of Hakkon	Ameridan	
2015	Company of Heroes 2: The British Forces	Sapper	
2015	The Witcher 3: Hearts of Stone	Ewald Borsodi	
2016	Hitman	Various characters	
2018	Dragon Quest XI	Jasper	
2020	Assassin’s Creed Valhalla	Ynyr ap Cadfarch	
2021	Bravely Default II	Gwilym	
2024	Elden Ring	Count Ymir	
2025	007 First Light	Various Characters	
