= Gareth Pierce =

Welsh actor and musician

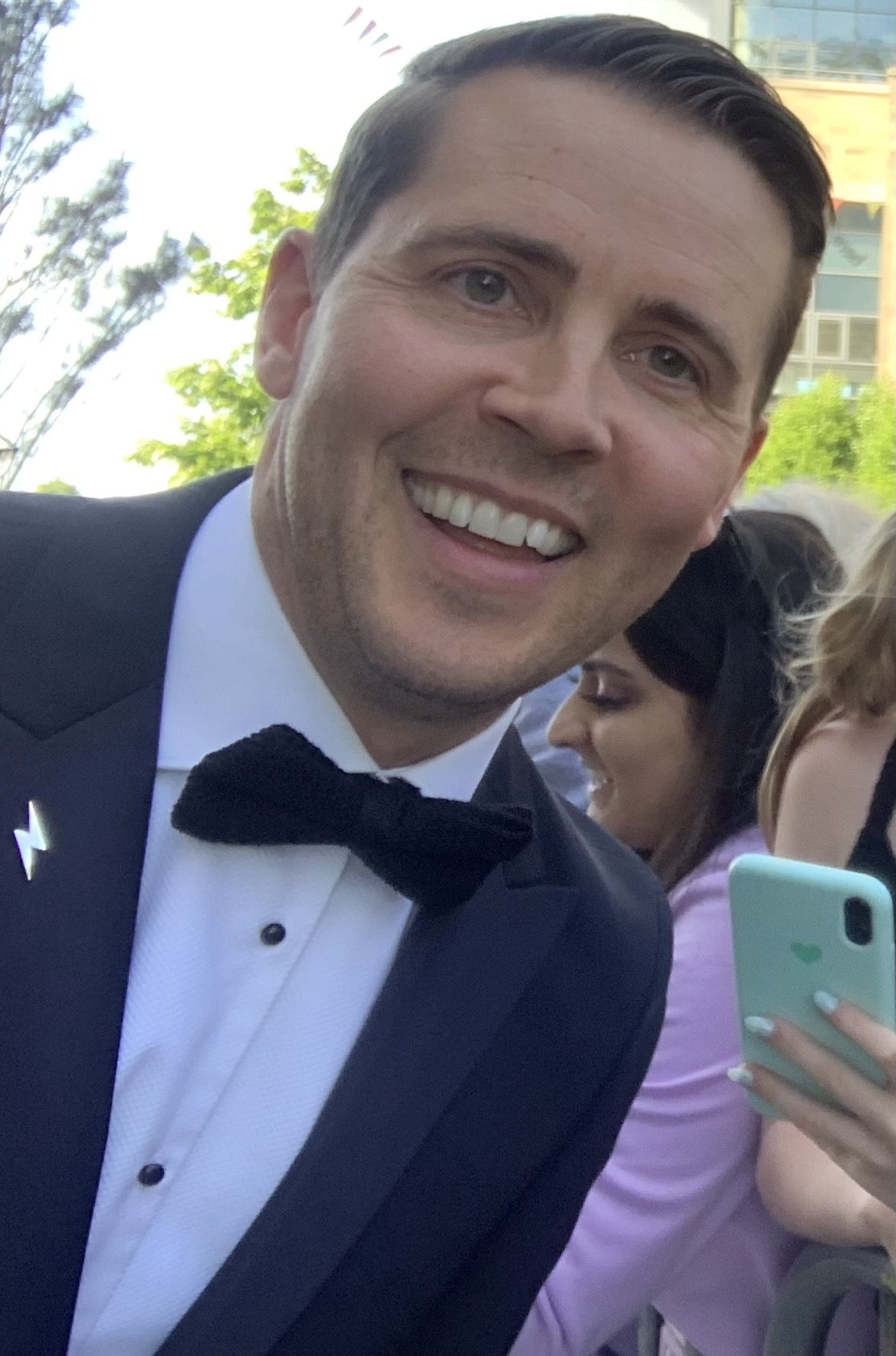
- Pierce in 2023
- Born: 19 February 1981 (age 45)
- Occupations: Actor; musician
- Years active: 2004–present
- Musical career
- Genres: Pop; rock
- Instrument: Drums
- Labels: Recordiau Cartref; Sain

Gareth Pierce (born 19 February 1981) is a Welsh actor and musician who has appeared in various television series. In 2020, he began portraying Gavin Moss in BBC Radio 4's The Archers and became the second actor to play Todd Grimshaw in the ITV soap Coronation Street. In 2006, Pierce was named in the Top 50 most eligible bachelors list by Company Magazine.

== Career ==
In 2008, Pierce and Matthew Wall founded the band Hafaliadau = Equations. Owain Taylor-Shaw joined in April 2008, followed by Mark Flanagan. Their debut album was released in November 2008.

Pierce is known for his roles as Osian James in the S4C TV-series Caerdydd (five series, 2006–2010) and Lenny Mack in Sky 1's Stella (two series, 2013–2014). He appeared in such S4C series as Y Gwyll, Cara Fi, Alys, Pen Talar, Cowbois ac Injans and soap Pobol y Cwm. He appeared in the second series of Y Pris in 2009 as skinhead Nicky. Further English-speaking appearances include Hinterland, Mr Selfridge, and Hollyoaks.

In 2013, Pierce narrated all 11 episodes of Doctor Who: The Doctors Revisited, a documentary series in which each episode focused on an individual lead actor of Doctor Who in the run-up to the programme’s 50th anniversary in November of that year. He also played George of Clarence in The Globe's production of Henry VI. In March 2016, it was announced Pierce would be joining the regular cast of BBC1's Ordinary Lies for its second series.

In 2020, Pierce played Gavin Moss, son of Philip Moss, in the BBC Radio 4 series The Archers. In August 2020, it was announced that Pierce has replaced Bruno Langley in the role of Todd Grimshaw in the ITV soap Coronation Street, Langley having been convicted for sexual assault in 2017.

== Filmography ==
Year	Title	Role	Notes
2004	Chosen	Shaun Kennedy	TV series
2004	Bang Bang I Love You	Joe	Short film
2006–2010	Caerdydd	Osian James	Regular role
2008	Cymru Fach	Unnamed	Film
2009	Y Pris	Nicky	Series 2
2010	Pen Talar	Robert Evans	Episode #1.9
2012	Alys	Gareth	4 episodes
2013–2014	Stella	Lenny Mack	Series 2–3
2014	Cara Fi	Brian Phelps	All 8 episodes
2015	Hinterland	Alun Price	Episode #2.0
2015	35 Diwrnod	Reg	5 episodes
2016	Ordinary Lies	Karl Sheldon	Series 2
2017	Living a Lie	Robin Orme-Evans	2 episodes
2018	Apostle	Man #1	Film
2020	The Archers	Gavin Moss	
2020–present	Coronation Street	Todd Grimshaw	Series regular
