= Ed Thomas =

Welsh playwright, producer and director (born 1961)

Ed Thomas (born 1961, Abercraf, Powys, Wales) is a Welsh playwright, director, and producer.

== Biography ==
Ed Thomas studied English at Cardiff University, before venturing into London's theatre scene. He later returned to Wales and became a founding member and artistic director of Y Cwmni Cyf Theatre in Cardiff. In 1993, he received the prestigious BBC Writer of the Year Award. His plays, which challenge traditional notions of Welshness, are characterised by themes of longing and frustration. Notable works including House of America, Flowers of the Dead Red Sea, and East From the Gantry have been published by Seren Drama (1994).

As a playwright, director, and producer, Thomas's work has reached audiences in more than 100 countries and translated into more than 10 languages. His play House of America (1988) won the Time Out award for the best new play in London and was adapted into a feature film in 1996, earning multiple accolades (5x BAFTA Cymru Nominations, 4x Wins) (2x Stockholm Film Festival Nominations, 2x Wins).

Thomas's work has been showcased at The Royal Court London, Donmar Warehouse, Tramway Glasgow, Lyceum Edinburgh, Sherman Theater, as well as Chapter Art Center Cardiff. His work has also been used internationally, with productions in Barcelona, Bremen, Berlin, Copenhagen, Greece and Montreal.

Thomas is the founding member and Creative Director of the Cardiff-based film and TV independent production company Fiction Factory. Since 1995, he has written, directed and produced more than 200 hours programmes across various genres that garnered more than 80 nominations and awards including BAFTA, New York Film and TV Festival and the Golden Nymph Monte Carlo. His work can be seen on BBC, ITV and S4C. His credits include Satellite City, Fallen Sons, Silent Village, China, Cwmgiedd/Colombia, and the detective series Mind to Kill.

Thomas has made contributions to television and film, including the documentary A Silent Village: Pentre Mud and the film Fallen Sons, both of which received Celtic Film Festival Awards in 1994. The comedy series Satellite City and the film Rancid Aluminium, based on James Hawes' novel, was also directed by Thomas.

Thomas was a co-creator on the Welsh noir detective series Hinterland/Y Gwyll, a critically acclaimed show. The series has been broadcast in Denmark and Norway.

=== Tree on a Hill/Pren ar y Bryn ===
Thomas's new show, Tree on a Hill/Pren ar y Bryn, is a mischievous dark comedy drama that explores the theme of change in the wilds of a Penwyllt. The series follows the story of Margaret and Clive, a decent, ordinary couple who find themselves at the centre of a mystery and on the wrong side of the law, while watching the town they once loved disappear before their eyes. Shot back to back in English and Welsh, the series is a Fiction Factory co-production with S4C, BBC Wales, and All3Media International, with support from Tinopolis and the Welsh Government via Creative Wales.

== Works ==
=== Plays ===
- On Bear Ridge (2019)
- Stone City Blue (2005)
- Gas Station Angel (1998)
- A Song From a Forgotten City (1995)
- Envy (1993)
- Strangers in Conversation (1993)
- East From the Gantry (1992)
- Flowers of the Dead Red Sea (1991)
- The Myth of Michael Roderick (1990)
- Adar Heb Adenydd (1989)
- House of America (1988)

=== Literature ===
- A Greater Britain (2017)
- Fight and be Right (2015)
- The Dirt Road Sport: Growing Up in Old Florida's Cow Country (2015)

=== TV and film - Producer ===
- Tree on a Hill / Pren ar y Bryn (2023 / 2024)
- Bregus (2021)
- Gwaith/Cartref (2011–2018)
- Hinterland (2013–2016)
- Gadael Yr Ugeinfed Ganrif (2014)
- Pen Talar (2010)
- 'The Cornet Player (2009)
- TMi (2006)
- Dal: Yma/Nawr (2003)
- A Mind To Kill (2001–2002)
- Satellite City (1996–1999)

=== TV and film - Director ===
- Tree on a Hill/Pren ar y Bryn (2023/2024)
- Bregus (2021)
- Gwaith/Cartref (2011–2018)
- Hinterland (2013–2016)
- Pen Talar' (2010)
- Caerdydd (2006)
- Satellite City (1996)
- Silent Village (1994)

=== TV and film - Writer ===
- Tree on a Hill/Pren ar y Bryn (2023/2024)
- Bregus (2021)
- Hinterland (2013–2016)
- Pen Talar (2010)

== Honours ==
- Arts Foundation Fellow
- Honorary Fellow at The Royal Welsh College of Music and Drama
- Visiting Professor and Honorary Fellow at the University of Aberystwyth
