= Fiction Factory (company) =

Welsh television production company

Fiction Factory Ltd
- Type: Private
- Industry: Television production
- Founded: 2001
- Founder: Ed Thomas
- Headquarters: Cardiff, Wales
- Key people: Ed Thomas (creative director); Ffion Williams (producer)
- Parent: Tinopolis
- Website: www.FictionFactoryFilms.com

Fiction Factory Ltd is a television production company based in Cardiff, Wales.

Since 2005 it has produced over 140 hours of drama for BBC, ITV, Channel 5 and S4C, and has earned over 70 nominations and awards, from BAFTA and Celtic Film Festival to the Rose d’Or Prix Europa, with distribution to over 80 countries.

The company achieved a notable success with Hinterland/ Y Gwyll. Filmed in two language versions, Welsh and English, it was seen in 150 countries. On the showing of its first season it was reviewed favourably.

== History ==
Fiction Factory Films was founded in 2001 by Ed Thomas who became the creative director.

== Productions ==
| Title | Television channel | Broadcast | Notes | Awards |
|---|---|---|---|---|
| Satellite City | BBC Wales | 1996–1999 | Preceded by a radio version. | |
| A Mind to Kill | S4C, HTV, Channel 5 | 1999 | Took over the production of the third series. | |
| Dal: Yma/Nawr | S4C | 2003 | Starring Ioan Gruffudd, Rhys Ifans and Cerys Matthews | Winner of 2004 Celtic Film Festival |
| Caerdydd | S4C | 2006–2011 | | BAFTA Cymru 2011, Best Writer, Best Costume |
| Y Pris | S4C | 2007–2009 | | 2009 Celtic Film Festival, Winner, Best Drama Series |
| Pen Talar | S4C | 2010–2011 | | |
| Gwaith/Cartref | S4C | 2011–present | | |
| Y Gwyll/Hinterland | S4C, BBC Wales, BBC Four | 2013–present | | |
