= Richard Harrington (actor) =

British actor

- Born: March 12, 1975 (age 51); Gurnos, Merthyr Tydfil, Wales
- Occupation: Actor
- Years active: 1987–present
- Children: 4

Richard Harrington is a Welsh stage and TV actor. He has had starring roles in the shows Hinterland, Bleak House, Gunpowder, Treason & Plot, and the film The All Together. He won a BAFTA Cymru Award for his role in the film Dafydd and another for his role in Hinterland.

== Early life and education ==
Richard Harrington was born in Gurnos, Merthyr Tydfil, Wales, and grew up in Dowlais.

He studied at a Welsh Medium school in Merthyr and as a result, speaks Welsh as a second language.

== Career ==
Harrington has had starring roles in the Welsh show Hinterland (known as Y Gwyll in Welsh), Bleak House, Jimmy McGovern's Gunpowder, Treason & Plot, and Gavin Claxton's comedy feature film The All Together. He has also had roles in Coronation Street, Spooks, Casualty, Holby City, Hustle, Dalziel and Pascoe, Silent Witness, Lark Rise to Candleford, and Poldark. He won a BAFTA Cymru Award for his portrayal of a young gay hustler in the BBC film Dafydd, part of the Wales Playhouse programme.

On stage, Harrington has toured with Fiction Factory/Y Cwmni's productions of Ed Thomas's plays House of America, Gas Station Angel and Stone City Blue. He also appeared in the 1997 film version of House of America.

In 2015, Harrington won another BAFTA Cymru Award for his role as DCI Tom Matthias in Y Gwyll / Hinterland.

In April 2017, Harrington presented the BBC Two Wales programme Richard Harrington: My Grandfather's War, in which he followed the journey his grandfather had made through Spain in 1937 in order to fight against fascism in the Spanish Civil War.

In 2018 he appeared at the National Theatre in London in Home I'm Darling, a co-production with Theatr Clwyd.

In February 2021, speaking of the first year of the COVID-19 pandemic, Harrington revealed that he had worked as a Deliveroo driver to supplement his income during lockdown, due to the lack of work.

In 2026 he was cast as the voice of Grand Moff Tarkin in the Welsh dub of Star Wars: Episode IV – A New Hope.

== Personal life ==
Harrington has two children with a former girlfriend and two with his current girlfriend, Hannah Daniel, with whom he lives in Crystal Palace, London.

In 2012 and 2013, he took part in the Snowdonia Marathon alongside his friend and fellow actor Mark Lewis Jones. They both ran Marathon des Sables in 2014.

== Filmography ==
Film

Year	Title	Role	Notes
1993	Gadael Lenin (Leaving Lenin)	Charlie	
1996	The Proposition	Evan	
1996	Pobol y Cym	Ossie	
1997	House of America	Cat	
1997	Breeders	Jack	
1997	Motor Driving Made Easy	Reflex Action	Short
1998	A Light in the Valley	Cast member	
1999	Oh Little Town of Bethlehem	Martin	Short
2000	Care (2000 TV film)	Tony Collins	TV film
2001	Score	Neil	TV film
2001	A Day Out	Girl's Father	Short
2002	High Speed	Spike	
2002	Mule	Ray	Short
2003	Rehab	Powell	TV film
2003	The Ride	Spike	
2004	Secret Passage	Joseph	
2004	Mathilde (film)	Babyface	
2005	Fatigue		
2006	Daddy's Girl	Stephen	
2007	The All Together	Jerry Davies	
2007	The Contractor	Terry Winchell	
2008	Strap-on Owl Beak	Actor	Short
2008	Hope Eternal	Evan	
2011	Little Munchkin	Mr. Jones	Short
2011	Burton: Y Gyfrinach	Richard Burton	TV film
2011	My Times		Short
2012	Elfie Hopkins	Timothy Jenkins	
2014	Under Milk Wood	Neighbour	TV film
2015	Just Jim	Headmaster	
2016	Royal Wives at War	Narrator	TV film
2016	My Grandfather's War	Himself	BBC TV documentary about the International Brigades during the Spanish Civil War
2018	Hatchback	John	Short
2018	Gwen	Edward Morris	
2018	Last Summer	Dai Hop	
2019	Bitter Sky	Roy	Short
2021	The Most Reluctant Convert	Albert Lewis	The story of C.S. Lewis' early life and conversion to Christianity
2022	Fisherman's Friends: One and All	Morgan Jenkins	
2023	Consent	Headmaster	Channel Four
2025	Havoc	Jake	
2026	Star Wars: Gobaith Newydd	Grand Moff Tarkin	Welsh dub of Star Wars: Episode IV – A New Hope

Television

Year	Title	Role	Notes
1987	The District Nurse	Donald Turner	Episode: "A Blind Eye"
1989	Screen One		Series 1: episode 2: "Nineteen 96"
1992	Civvies	Taffy's neighbour	1 episode
1993, 1995	Wales Playhouse	Sion / Dafydd	2 episodes: "Broken Glass" & "Dafydd"; BAFTA Cymru Award - Best Actor (Yr Actor Gorau)
1995	Oliver's Travels	Student	Mini-series
1995-1997	A Mind to Kill	Paul Tam	3 episodes
1997	Tiger Bay	Warwick	3 episodes
1999	Coronation Street	Owen Williams	4 episodes
2002	The Hidden City	Barney	
2003	Holby City	Lee Walmsley	1 episode: "By Any Other Name"
2004	Hustle	Sam Richards	1 episode: "Cops and Robbers"
2004	Silent Witness	Stephen Barnes	2 episodes: "Nowhere Fast: Parts 1 & 2"
2004	Spooks	Will North	6 episodes
2005	Dalziel and Pascoe	Gary Mileham	Series 9: episode 33: "Heads You Lose: Parts 1 & 2"
2005	Bleak House	Allan Woodcourt	7 episodes
2006	Ancient Rome: The Rise and Fall of an Empire	Yohanon	1 episode: "Rebellion"
2006	Casualty	Jerry Goater	1 episode: "Last Orders"
2007	Five Days	Daf Parry	3 episodes
2007	Y Pris	Stuart	1 episode: "Parch (Respect)"
2007	Sold	Paul Bamforth	1 episode
2007–2008	HolbyBlue	DS Luke French	20 episodes
2008	New Tricks	Ash	1 episode: "Communal Living"
2009	Missing	Ryan Long	1 episode: "Deeper Problems"
2009	Land Girls	Adam Blackfield	2 episodes: "Trekkers" & "Destinies"
2009	Collision	James Taylor / Ben Hickman	3 episodes
2010	M.I. High	Tommy Blumenheck	1 episode: "Don't Cook Now"
2010	Midsomer Murders	Leo Fincher	1 episode: "Blood on the Saddle"
2010	Pen Talar	Defi Lewis	7 episodes
2011	Lark Rise to Candleford	Gabriel Cochrane	Series 4: 6 episodes
2012	Casualty	Chris Johnson	2 episodes: "Duty of Care" & "Death and Doughnuts"
2012	Alys	Simon	8 episodes
2013–2016	Y Gwyll / Hinterland	DCI Tom Mathias	Lead role
2014	Wolfblood	Gerwyn	4 episodes
2015–2016	Poldark	Captain Andrew Blamey	5 episodes
2016	Stella	Ian Meyer	
2017	Inspector George Gently	Michael Clements	1 episode: "Gently and the New Age"
2018	Requiem	Aron Morgan	6 episodes
2018	Father Brown	Benedict Northam	1 episode: "The Face of the Enemy"
2018	Death in Paradise	Bryn Williams	1 episode: "Meditated in Murder"
2019	The Crown	Fred Phillips	Season 3: episode 3: "Aberfan"
2020	Gangs of London	Mal	4 episodes
2020	Endeavour	Dr. Dai Ferman	2 episodes: "Oracle" & "Zenana"
2021	Fflam	Bedwyr Neale	S4C series; 6 episodes
2022	The Chelsea Detective	Rory Fisk	1 episode
2022	Dalgliesh	Dr David Rollinson	2 episodes
2023	Steeltown Murders	Colin Dark	4 episodes
2023	Tree On A Hill	Glyn	5 episodes
2024	McDonald & Dodds	Lenny	1 episode
2025	The One That Got Away	DS Rick Sheldon	

Theatre

- House of America – Fiction Factory
- Gas Station Angel – Royal Court
- Stone City Blue – Theatre Clwyd
- Art and Guff – Soho Theatre
- Other Hands – Soho Theatre
- Look Back in Anger –

Theatre Royal, Bath

- Coriolanus – NTW
- Home I'm Darling – National Theatre
- The Promise - Chichester Festival
- The Unseen - Riverside Studios
- House Of Games - Hampstead Theatre
