= Hannah Daniel =

Welsh actress

- Born: 20 January 1986 (age 40); Cardiff, Wales, United Kingdom
- Occupation: Actress
- Years active: 2004–present
- Children: 2

Hannah Daniel (born 20 January 1986) is a British actress from Cardiff, Wales, best known for her roles on TV series Hinterland, Keeping Faith and Holby City.

== Early life ==
Hannah Daniel was born in Cardiff. She attended Ysgol Gyfun Gymraeg Glantaf and later read English literature at University College London, By age 24, she was a S4C presenter.

Georgia Lee and Daniel wrote and directed (You Have Reached Your) DESTINATION, about a 29 year old Uber driver's pregnancy.

== Personal life ==
Daniel lives in London, with her partner, the actor Richard Harrington. Daniel and Harrington worked together for all three series of the dual-language crime drama Hinterland/Y Gwyll (aired 2013–2016), where every scene was shot first in Welsh and then in English. Each of the two productions was then compiled and aired as a separate three-series programme. Harrington appeared as the lead actor, DCI Tom Mathias, and Daniel played one of his subordinates, DS Siân Owens. They have two sons together, Moris born in 2019 and Jaco born in 2021.

== Filmography ==
=== Television ===
Year	Title	Role	Notes
2004	Two Dragons		Short
2005	Dad	Millie James	
2005	Casualty	Dee Naseby	Episode: Baby Love
2007	Olas de Verano	Cerys Jones	
2008	Y Garej	Co-presenter	S4C programme
2010	Pen Talar	Gail	
2011–2015	Gwaith Cartref	Beca Matthews	Series 1–5
2013	Beat	Drunk woman	Short
2013–2016	Y Gwyll / Hinterland	DS Siân Owen	Main role
2015	Doctors	Christina Evenden	Episode: Trust Me I’m a Doctor
2017–2020	Keeping Faith	Cerys Jones	Main role; also starred in the Welsh version Un Bore Mercher.
2017	Canaries	Agnes D	Short
2017	Destination	Beca	Short
2017	50! Pen-blwydd Hapus Merched y Wawr	Presenter	1 episode
2018	Holby City	Leah Faulkner	Recurring role
2018	Tourist Tap	Andi	
2018	Morfydd	Beti Bwt	S4C drama
2019–2020	EastEnders	DCI Morgan	Recurring role
2020	The Crash Detectives	Narrator	Documentary
2020	Cyswllt (Mewn COVID)	Ffion	S4C drama
2020	Beacons: Short Films from Wales	Ani / Greta / Siân Llywelyn	1 episode; also writer, director and executive producer
2021	Bregus	Ellie Bateman	Main role
2022	The Light in the Hall	Izzy	
2025	The One That Got Away	Lisa Redwood	
2025	The Guest	Gemma	

=== Film ===
Year	Title	Role	Notes
2014	Benny & Jolene	Strictly Sherry	
2015	Black Mountain Poets	Alys Wilding	
