= Bradley Freegard =

Welsh actor (born 1976)

Bradley Freegard is a Welsh actor.

== Early life ==
Freegard was born 13 December, 1976 in Pontypridd, Wales. He studied at the Royal Welsh College of Music and Drama.

== Career ==
Freegard plays the regular role of Steffan Jones in the S4C series Teulu, a character who has been described by the Western Mail as the resident heartthrob. In 2012 he appeared in EastEnders as the character Gethin Williams, making him the first actor to play a Welsh character in the soap opera since Richard Elis in 1996. The character played a role in the departure storyline of regular character Jane Beale.

His other television credits include Casualty, Doctors, Caerdydd, Gwaith/Cartref, Holby City, Y Gwyll/Hinterland, and Pobol y Cwm. In 2017, Freegard was chosen to play the role of Evan Howells in Un Bore Mercher/Keeping Faith opposite his wife who played the titular Faith.

In 2022, Freegard portrayed King Canute in the Netflix series Vikings: Valhalla.

== Personal life ==
Freegard met actress Eve Myles at the National Youth Theatre in 1994; they have three daughters and were married in Italy on 18 May 2013.
