= Keeping Faith (TV series) =

Welsh television series

- Also known as: Un Bore Mercher (One Wednesday Morning)
- Genre: Thriller
- Created by: Matthew Hall
- Directed by: Pip Broughton; Andy Newbery
- Starring: Eve Myles; Hannah Daniel; Matthew Gravelle; Bradley Freegard; Mark Lewis Jones; Aneirin Hughes; Mali Harries
- Composers: Laurence Love Greed; Amy Wadge
- Country of origin: United Kingdom (Wales)
- Original languages: Welsh; English (Note: The series is filmed concurrently in both languages.)
- No. of series: 3
- No. of episodes: 20

Production
- Executive producers: Adrian Bate; Maggie Russell; Shane Murphy
- Producers: Pip Broughton; Nora Ostler
- Production locations: Carmarthen; Laugharne; Carmarthenshire; Swansea; Vale of Glamorgan
- Cinematography: Steve Lawes; Rory Taylor; Bjorn Bratberg
- Running time: 60 minutes
- Production companies: Vox Pictures; Nevision; Cinematic Productions; Soundworks; About Premium Content

Original release
- Network: S4C (Welsh); BBC One Wales (English)
- Release: 5 November 2017 – 6 December 2020

Keeping Faith (Welsh: Un Bore Mercher, "One Wednesday Morning") is a British thriller television series, filmed and set in Wales, and first broadcast in Welsh on S4C on 5 November 2017.

Created by Matthew Hall and produced by Vox Pictures. The series stars Eve Myles as Faith Howells, a solicitor at a family-run law firm whose husband, Evan, disappears whilst she is on maternity leave following the birth of their third child.

Renamed Keeping Faith, the English version premiered on BBC One Wales on 13 February 2018. The first series co-stars Hannah Daniel, Matthew Gravelle, Bradley Freegard, Mark Lewis Jones, Mali Harries and Aneirin Hughes. The show was extremely popular in Wales, with an average of 300,000 viewers per episode, making it the most popular show on BBC Wales for more than 25 years and, with more than 8.5 million downloads by May 2018, the most downloaded non-network show on BBC iPlayer.

Filmed concurrently in both languages, this series is the second in a season of bilingual dramas set to premiere back-to-back on S4C. The initial Welsh language broadcast on S4C carried entirely English subtitles, while repeat airings carried encoded English subtitles. The series has been available on the BBC iPlayer as part of the BBC's ongoing relationship with S4C.

On 15 June 2018 the BBC announced that Keeping Faith would be shown across the UK on BBC One, beginning on 10 July 2018. The Head of Commissioning for BBC Wales, Nick Andrews, said that the series had been "a real gem from start to finish", and a testament to the strength of drama coming out of Wales.

With series one ending with a cliff-hanger, Huw Thomas, the BBC Wales arts and media correspondent, wrote on 6 May 2018 that a second series was in development and later that year the second series was commissioned. Production began in September 2018 and broadcast in Wales, first in Welsh (with English subtitles) on S4C, from 12 May 2019; nationally shown on BBC One in English during July–August 2019.

The third and final series premiered on S4C (as Un Bore Mercher) in 2020 during November and December, and the English language broadcast began on BBC One on 27 March 2021. This series was made available on the BBC iPlayer on 27 March 2021. By May 2021 the series had had more than 50 million views on BBC iPlayer.

== Cast ==
- Eve Myles as Faith Howells; solicitor and mother of three. Evan Howells' wife
- Bradley Freegard as Evan Howells; struck-off solicitor. Faith's husband
- Demi Letherby as Alys Howells; elder daughter of Faith and Evan
- Lacey Jones as Megan Howells; younger daughter of Faith and Evan
- Oscar & Harry Unsworth as Rhodri Howells; son of Faith and Evan
- Aneirin Hughes as Tom Howells; Evan's father and solicitor
- Hannah Daniel as Cerys Jones; solicitor at Howells
- Betsan Llwyd (Un Bore Mercher) / Suzanne Packer (Keeping Faith) as Delyth Lloyd; Howells' office administrator
- Eiry Thomas as DI (Series 1), PC (Series 2), DS (Series 3) Susan Williams; Abercorran police
- Steffan Rhodri as Judge Gwyn Daniels
- Matthew Gravelle as PC Terry Price; Abercorran police and Evan’s brother-in-law (Series 1)
- Mali Harries as Bethan Price; Terry's wife and Evan's sister (Series 1)
- Rhian Morgan as Marion Howells; Evan's mother
- Mark Lewis Jones as Steve Baldini; client
- Martha Bright as Angie Baldini; Steve's daughter
- Alex Harries as Arthur Davies; client
- Catherine Ayers as Lisa Connors; Faith's best friend
- Angeline Ball (Series 1) / Anastasia Hille (Series 2) as Gael Reardon; widow of Paddy Reardon
- Richard Elfyn as DCI Huw Parry of Swansea police (Series 1)
- Lowri Palfrey as Erin Glynn; client (Series 1)
- Aimee-Ffion Edwards as Madlen Vaughan; client (Series 2)
- Brochan Evans as Dyfan Vaughan; Madlen's son (Series 2)
- Rhashan Stone as DI Laurence Breeze; Met CID detective (Series 2 and 3)
- Rhian Blythe as Anya Flye; Howells' bank manager (Series 2)
- Richard Lynch as Hayden Swancott QC (Series 2)
- Francesca Dimech as Mrs Kripinski (Series 2)
- Siân Phillips as Judge Alwen Owens (Series 3)
- Celia Imrie as Rose Fairchild; Faith's mother (Series 3)
- Matthew Aubrey as Mike Taylor, father of Osian Taylor (Series 3)
- Keogh Kiernan as Osian Taylor (Series 3)
- Sion Daniel Young as Gareth; Osian's nurse (Series 3)
- Marc Antolin as Professor Rhys (Series 3)
- Rachel Cheung as the gym manager (Series 3)

== Episodes ==
Series	Episodes	Originally released		
Series	Episodes	First released	Last released	Network
1	8	5 November 2017	24 December 2017	S4C
2	6	12 May 2019	16 June 2019	S4C
3	6	1 November 2020	6 December 2020	S4C

=== Series 1 (2017) ===
No. overall	No. in series	Title	Directed by	Written by	Original release date	BBC One English airdate	Wales (S4C) viewers (millions)	BBC One viewers
1	1	"Episode 1"	Pip Broughton	Matthew Hall	5 November 2017	10 July 2018	0.46	4.78
2	2	"Episode 2"	Pip Broughton	Matthew Hall & Sian Naiomi	12 November 2017	17 July 2018	0.37	4.08
3	3	"Episode 3"	Pip Broughton	Matthew Hall	19 November 2017	24 July 2018	<0.20	4.24
4	4	"Episode 4"	Pip Broughton	Matthew Hall & Anwen Huws	26 November 2017	31 July 2018	0.36	4.38
5	5	"Episode 5"	Andy Newbery	Matthew Hall	3 December 2017	7 August 2018	0.32	3.99
6	6	"Episode 6"	Andy Newbery	Matthew Hall	10 December 2017	14 August 2018	<0.24	4.01
7	7	"Episode 7"	Pip Broughton	Matthew Hall	17 December 2017	21 August 2018	0.22	4.13
8	8	"Episode 8"	Pip Broughton	Matthew Hall	24 December 2017	28 August 2018	0.23	4.33

=== Series 2 (2019) ===
No. overall	No. in series	Title	Directed by	Written by	Original release date	BBC One English airdate	Wales viewers (millions)	BBC One viewers
9	1	"Episode 1"	Pip Broughton	Matthew Hall	12 May 2019	23 July 2019	0.64	5.38
10	2	"Episode 2"	Judith Dine	Matthew Hall	19 May 2019	30 July 2019	0.50	3.92
11	3	"Episode 3"	Judith Dine	Pip Broughton	26 May 2019	6 August 2019	0.38	N/A (<3.84) (Note: Not reported in the weekly top 15 programmes for four-screen viewer ratings.)
12	4	"Episode 4"	Pip Broughton	Pip Broughton	2 June 2019	13 August 2019	0.35	N/A (<3.71)
13	5	"Episode 5"	Pip Broughton	Matthew Hall	9 June 2019	20 August 2019	0.40	N/A (<3.50)
14	6	"Episode 6"	Pip Broughton	Matthew Hall	16 June 2019	27 August 2019	0.45	N/A (<3.74)

=== Series 3 (2021) ===
No. overall	No. in series	Title	Directed by	Written by	Original release date
15	1	"Episode 1"	Pip Broughton	Matthew Hall	27 March 2021
16	2	"Episode 2"	Pip Broughton	Matthew Hall, Pip Broughton	3 April 2021
17	3	"Episode 3"	Judith Dine	Matthew Hall	10 April 2021
18	4	"Episode 4"	Pip Broughton	Pip Broughton	17 April 2021
19	5	"Episode 5"	Judith Dine	Matthew Hall	24 April 2021
20	6	"Episode 6"	Judith Dine	Matthew Hall	1 May 2021

== Production ==
Set in the fictional town of Abercorran, filming started in the summer of 2017 in Carmarthenshire, with exterior views of Faith's home situated high up overlooking the estuary and the castle of Laugharne. Many scenes were shot in Laugharne, also in Carmarthen; the main square and the historic courtroom in Carmarthen Guildhall was used for scenes. Other courtroom scenes feature the former courthouse at Swansea. Studio scenes were filmed at Sony UK Technology Centre's Ffilm Factory 35 in Pencoed. The Vale of Glamorgan, Pontardawe and Swansea were other filming locations.

Vox pictures produced the drama with the aid of Nevision, Cinematic Productions, Soundworks and About Premium Content. The production of the programme was funded through the Welsh Government's Media Investment Budget, which is advised by Pinewood Pictures, S4C and BBC Wales. Location assistance was provided by Wales Screen, part of the Welsh Government's creative industries team, helping to maximise the economic benefits for Wales.

Gwawr Martha Lloyd, S4C Drama Content Commissioner, said of the series; "We're very excited about this new and original series that will be premiering on S4C this autumn. With a stellar cast and a completely compelling story, plot and setting, we're hoping the audience will grow to love the world and the characters of Un Bore Mercher as much as we in S4C have as we worked to develop the series. The series intends to take the viewer on a thrilling, emotional and warm journey, which will pull at their heart-strings but will also make them smile along the way."

== Critical reception ==
The series has generally received favourable responses and was described in The Guardian as, "a bit like Big Little Lies relocated to rural Wales". As Un Bore Mercher, the Welsh version of the series gained strong reviews. Gary Raymond, in Wales Arts Review, wrote: "...particularly interesting to see a genuine diamond emerge from the coalface in the form of Keeping Faith" and "Social media opinion has been a little more approving" [than the limited publicity surrounding the series].

Lydia Morris at the UK Daily Post wrote that the programme "...has already proved a hit with TV audiences". A review (under 'Show and Tell' by Paul Flynn) in Grazia magazine was titled "Like Broadchurch when it was good, Welsh production Keeping Faith is a TV trailblazer" and was generous with its praise. Writing in The Times, Nicole Wynne described it as "...the dual-language drama that has got box-set Britain gripped". On 2 May 2018, Stuart Heritage of the i warned, "Watch this game-changing thriller while you still can". Jon Coates in the Daily Express wrote, "Keeping Faith's unprecedented success ... has led to a primetime run on BBC One starting on Thursday ... with a second series due to begin filming this autumn." The Guardian review in July 2018, "... already a huge iPlayer hit, this Carmarthen-set drama about a vanished husband is realistic and beautifully shot ... it looks real and brilliant and Welsh". 'crimefictionlover' wrote: "The BBC has a secret... it's worth seeking out".

The first series won three Welsh BAFTAs in 2018: Best Actress (Eve Myles), Best Writer (Matthew Hall) and Original Music (Amy Wadge and Laurence Love Greed).

== Music ==
Six original songs were composed by the singer-songwriter Amy Wadge. The English and Welsh soundtracks were released as EPs on iTunes on Friday 9 March 2018. The English versions are sung by Amy Wadge and the Welsh versions by Ela Hughes. The score music was written by Laurence Love Greed.

== Adaptations ==
A French remake of the series starring Cécile Bois, called Gloria, was released by TF1 in March 2021. A South Korean adaptation titled Hide, starring Lee Bo-young, will air on JTBC and Coupang Play beginning March 2024. A Turkish adaptation titled Başka Bir Gün, starring Ezgi Mola, was released by ATV in January 2025.

== See also ==
- List of Welsh television series
