= List of Welsh television programmes =

This is a list of Welsh television programmes including those produced or commissioned in Wales. This page also separately lists programmes filmed in Wales.

== Welsh language only ==
=== Drama ===
- Alys
- Caerdydd
- Yr Amgueddfa
- Y Goleudy
- Gwaith/Cartref
- 35 Diwrnod
- Cowbois ac Injans
- Con Passionate
- Pen Talar
- Y Pris

=== Comedy ===
- C'mon Midffîld!
- Cara Fi

=== Soap ===
- Pobol y Cwm
- Rownd a Rownd

=== Talk show ===
- Heno
- Wedi 7
- Y Byd ar Bedwar

=== Sport ===
- Clwb Rygbi
- Sgorio

== Produced in both Welsh and English languages ==
The list shows the original title of the series in Welsh followed by the English language title.

=== Drama ===
- Y Gwyll / Hinterland
- Un Bore Mercher / Keeping Faith
- Dal y Mellt / Rough Cut
- Y Golau / The Light in the Hall
- Craith / Hidden
- Bang
- Yr Heliwr / A Mind to Kill

=== Comedy ===
- Ryan a Ronnie / Ryan and Ronnie

=== For children ===
- Sam Tân / Fireman Sam
- SuperTed
- Testament: Y Beibl Wedi'i Animeiddio / Testament: The Bible in Animation

== English language only ==
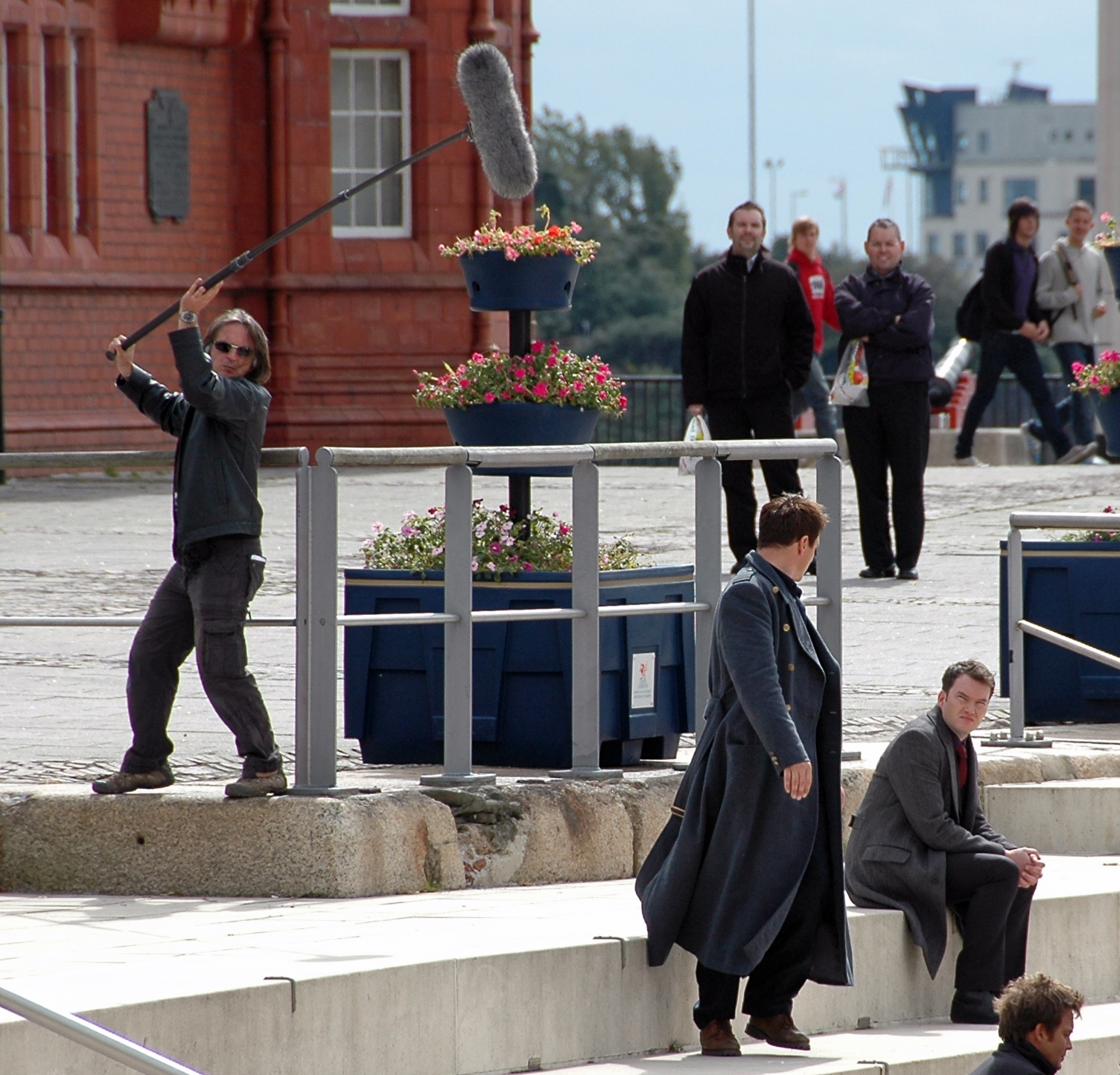
Filming Torchwood in Cardiff bay

=== Drama ===
- Steeltown Murders
- A Discovery of Witches
- Torchwood
- Baker Boys
- First Degree
- Crash
- Drovers' Gold
- The Bench
- Belonging
- We Are Seven
- The District Nurse
- Off to Philadelphia in the Morning
- Telltale
- Mortimer's Law
- Nuts and Bolts
- Doctor Who (produced by BBC Wales since 2005)
- In My Skin (TV series)
- Casualty (produced by BBC Wales from 2012)
- Jack of Hearts
- Ennal's Point
- Death Valley (British TV series)
- The Guest (British TV series)
- The Rapture (TV series)

=== Comedy ===
- Stella
- Barry Welsh Is Coming
- High Hopes
- Satellite City
- The Tuckers
- Mammoth (TV series)

=== Soap ===
- Taff Acre

=== For Children ===
- The Sarah Jane Adventures

=== Non-fiction ===
- The Dragon Has Two Tongues
- Scrum V
- Wales at Six
- Wales This Week
- Wild Wales
- Coal House
- BBC Wales Today

== Notable series filmed in Wales ==
=== Drama ===
- Willow
- Sex Education
- Sherlock
- Merlin
- The Magnificent Evans
- Requiem
- Da Vinci's Demons
- Mine All Mine
- Will
- Born to Kill
- The Indian Doctor
- The Bastard Executioner
- Britannia
- Decline and Fall
- The Accident
- The Pembrokeshire Murders

=== Comedy ===
- Gavin & Stacey

=== Factual ===
- Welcome to Wrexham

== See also ==
- Television in Wales
- List of Welsh films
- Cinema of Wales
- List of Welsh-language programmes
