= Mali Harries =

Welsh actress

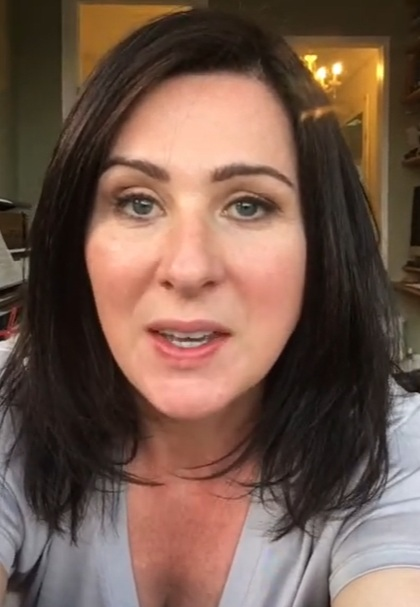
- Harries in 2018
- Born: Mali Rhys Harries; 6 July 1976 (age 50); Cardiff, Wales
- Occupation: Actress
- Years active: 1989–present
- Spouse: Matthew Gravelle (m. 1999)

Mali Rhys Harries (born 6 July 1976) is a Welsh television actress and presenter who has been in the television industry since 1989. She has appeared in several well-established TV series in Welsh and English, including Hinterland, The Indian Doctor and Pobol y Cwm.

== Career ==
Born in Cardiff, Harries attended Ysgol Gyfun Gymraeg Glantaf and graduated from the Bristol Old Vic Theatre School.

She is married to actor Matthew Gravelle. She appeared alongside Gravelle in Baker Boys; each is married to another character in the series. They appear as husband and wife in the S4C drama Un Bore Mercher in 2017, which aired on BBC One in 2018 in an English-language version as Keeping Faith.

In 2010, she was nominated for a BAFTA Cymru award for Best Actress in the Welsh language TV drama, Caerdydd.

Between 2013 and 2016, Harries won critical acclaim as a star in the detective series Y Gwyll (titled Hinterland in English), the first bilingual Welsh-English series to air on the BBC.

In 2014, Harries was voted into the top 10 of the Wales Online "Sexiest Woman in Wales" poll.

Harries has become known for her work with S4C, including the first series of Keeping Faith, her own crime documentary series Y Ditectif and long-running soap Pobol y Cwm.

== Personal life ==
Mali Harries is married to fellow Welsh performer Matthew Gravelle. The couple have played each other's on-screen significant other in several TV shows.

== Filmography ==
=== Film ===
Year	Film	Role	Notes
2002	Dirgelwch Yr Ogof	Lucille	Welsh film
2003	Y Mabinogi	Cigfa	Voice only
2006	Sixty Six	Mrs Shivers	
2008	Heavenly Father	Sheley	
2010	Leap Year	Aer Lingus Rep 1	
2010	Rhwyd	Eirlys	Welsh film

=== Television ===
Year	Title	Role	Notes
1989	Dyddiadur Dyn Dwad	School girl	
1996	The Levels	Alex	
1999	Dalziel and Pascoe	Young Cissy Kohler	Episode: "Recalled to Life"
2000	P.O.V.	Gloria	
2000	Midsomer Murders	Nurse O'Casey	Episode: "Blue Herrings"
2000	Dirty Work	Molly	
2001	The Bill	Wendy Pike	Episode: "Crush"
2002–2003, 2007	Foyle's War	Jane Milner	Series 1–2, 4
2003	The Inspector Lynley Mysteries	Nancy	Episode: "A Suitable Vengeance"
2003	Final Demand	Corinne	Television film
2003	Byron	Anna Rood/Fletcher	
2003	Holby City	Karen Edwards	Episode: "Accidents will Happen"
2004	May 33rd	Sarah Sorensson	
2004–2006	Winx Club	Blodwyn	Welsh version
2004–2007	Pentre Bach	Jini	Main cast
2005	The Bill	Mandy Phelps	
2005	Doctor Who	Cathy	Episode: "Boom Town"
2006–2010	Caerdydd	Kate Marshall	5 series
2006	Brief Encounters	Julie Owen	
2006	Doctors	Judy Pearson	Episode: "Cat and Mouse"
2006	Coming Up	Shelley	Episode: "Heavenly Father"
2009	Murderland	WPC Hart	2 episodes
2010–2013	The Indian Doctor	Megan Evans	Main Role; 3 series
2010	Pen Talar	Siân Lewis	
2009	Ar y Tracs	Sophie Thomas	S4C film
2011	Casualty	Elaine Armstrong	
2011	Doctors	Sally Caine	Episode: "Smoke and Mirrors"
2011	Baker Boys	Lucy	2 series
2011	Ar y Tracs – Y Trên i’r Gêm	Sophie Thomas	S4C film
2012	The Best of Men	Shirley Bowen	Television film
2012	The Richard Burton Diaries	Narrator	
2012	Doctors	Sonya Marsh	Episode: "The Pain and the Itch"
2012	Being Human	Lisa Monkton	
2013–2016	Great Welsh Writers	Narrator	
2013–2016	Hinterland / Y Gwyll	DI Mared Rhys	Main role
2015	Critical	Nerys Merrick	Main role
2015	Lewis	Sarah Alderwood	Episode: "What Lies Tangled"
2016	New Blood	Gwynn Hughes MP	
2016–2018	Y Ditectif	Presenter	Crime documentary on S4C; 3 series
2017	Keeping Faith	Bethan Price	Series 1; also starred in the Welsh version Un Bore Mercher.
2018–2022	Pobol y Cwm	Jaclyn Parri	Series regular
2022	Brassic	Babs	1 episode - Guest appearance
2023	Firebombers	Narrator	2 episodes
2023	The Doll Factory	Moll	2 episodes
2024	The Way	Dee Driscoll	Main role

=== Radio ===
Year	Title	Role	Notes
2018–present	The Archers	Natasha Archer	Series Regular

=== Video games ===
Year	Title	Role	Notes
2022	Elden Ring	Rennala, Queen of the Full Moon; Dominula Dancers	Voice
