= James Hawes (disambiguation) =

James Hawes is a British television director.

James Hawes may also refer to:

- James Hawes (author) (born 1960), British novelist and screenwriter
- James Hawes (mayor), Lord Mayor of London in 1574
- James Morrison Hawes (1824–1889), American soldier
