= Project Raphael (radio serial) =

- Genre: Drama
- Running time: 30 minutes
- Country of origin: United Kingdom
- Language: English
- Home station: BBC Radio 4 Extra; BBC Radio 7
- Starring: Deborah McAndrew, Dan Hagley, Emily Chennery
- Written by: Jenny Stephens
- Directed by: Peter Leslie Wilde
- Original release: 2008
- No. of episodes: 3
- Audio format: Stereophonic sound

Project Raphael is a radio serial broadcast by the BBC. It mixes science fiction, supernatural and espionage themes in a story about a government agency that attempts to use "revenants", or ghosts of recently dead people, as agents in a conflict with an organization known as "The Nablovsky Colony", which apparently already has the ability to penetrate secret installations with their own ghosts. It was written by Jenny Stephens, and consists of three 30 minute episodes.

== Plot summary ==
Agent Finch works for an organization known as MI-7, apparently a branch of British Intelligence, that is trying to create and capture revenants for use in spying. As the first episode begins, her colleague Raphael is trying to summon the courage to kill himself to become a revenant. Once it becomes apparent he cannot, Finch shoots him.

Finding only a weak revenant from Raphael, Finch and her new boss, Agent Evans, try to recruit a local psychic, Malcolm Holmes, who lives in a small Yorkshire town near the MI-7 installation. MI-7 has been monitoring Malcolm since he was a child, after he showed signs of ability at his school. Malcolm lives with his mother, who runs a vegetarian food shop. He thinks he is being followed, and has lost his job at the local library after assaulting one of the people he believes is following him. The person he attacked is actually an MI-7 agent.

Finch and Evans test Malcolm at a local inn whose cellar is said to be haunted. It is really a front for the agency, and the cellar has much equipment in it that can detect psychic activity. The response is alarming. The ghost, a young girl, appears more strongly than they have ever seen it. Malcolm actually seems to amplify revenant activity. However Malcolm is accompanied by a local journalist, Polly Williams, and is falling in love with her. Before they can use Malcolm to recover Raphael, the agents have to separate them and make sure her story about the incident is not published.

Malcolm is taken to the MI-7 installation and told to find Raphael. He is able to communicate with Raphael, but in doing so reveals that Finch killed him. Finch had told her superiors that Raphael killed himself. Raphael is still too weak to be any use, however.

Polly tries to get inside the facility, triggering an alarm. Finch realizes that they can create a powerful revenant by first terrifying her, then killing her, using Malcolm to amplify the results. They release the guard dogs and prepare to shoot her. However Malcolm is psychically linked to Polly, and communicates his fears to Raphael, who becomes angry and powerful, disabling all the electrical systems. Malcolm and Polly escape to the inn, where they are cornered by Finch and Evans. The ghost tells Malcolm that Finch was her best friend when they both were young, but left her behind to die after a pile of barrels collapsed on her in the cellar. Finch gets ready to shoot Polly, but is herself shot by Evans. Finch is left behind in the cellar as a revenant herself, trapped with the friend she once abandoned.

== Cast ==
- Agent Finch - Deborah McAndrew
- Agent Evans - Aneirin Hughes
- Agent Raphael - John Flitcroft
- Malcolm Holmes - Dan Hagley
- Polly Williams - Emily Chennery
- Moira, Malcolm's mother - Sunny Ormonde
- P.C. Ahmet, a local police officer - Sikat Ahmed
- Emily Cross, the cellar ghost - Sophie Semuda

== Sequel ==
Project Raphael is followed by the sequel Project Archangel, in which Polly and Malcolm are kidnapped by the Nablovsky agents and meet the enemy revenant, who is Malcolm's father.
