= The Elizabethan Madrigal Singers =

Welsh choir

- Origin: Aberystwyth, Ceredigion, Wales
- Genre: Classical
- Years active: 1950–present
- Past members: William Mathias; Aneirin Hughes; Sophie Dobedoe; Fiona Deane; Frances Lovell; Tamsin Ratcliff; Emily Waide; Ray Evans; Lizzie Cunningham; Lisa Haufler; Baylee Schutte; Leah Plank; Owen Watts; Sam Davenport; Fraser Brown; Morgan Lang; Jacob Hunt; Angharad Nicol
- Website: https://www.abermads.co.uk

The Elizabethan Madrigal Singers is a choir that was founded by Walter Ryan in 1950 at Aberystwyth University.

== History ==
The history of 'The Mads' (as the choir is often known) has been chronicled recently in a book by Dale Webb, and an online archive has been created paying homage to the past 60 years. This brings together pictures, newspaper articles and sound files that have been found in both private collections and at the National Library of Wales. While the Mads have appeared in local newspapers, and continue to do so. They have also appeared on BBC programmes (Songs for the Asking) and on radio.

The choir has a rich history of concerts in and around the Aberystwyth area. The Elizabethan Madrigal Singers also continue to tour regularly. Having in the past visited Russia, Iceland, the US, the Seychelles and most of Europe. In November 2010 the choir had the privilege of singing on the pitch in Cardiff's Millennium Stadium at the start of the Wales vs South Africa rugby game.

== Notable past members and associates ==
- William Mathias – Member and wrote "Gloria in Excelsis Deo" for Mads in 1954.
- Jayne Davies – Vice-president of the Llangollen International Eisteddfod.
- Mervyn Williams – former head of music at BBC Wales
- Haydn James – former musical director of The London Welsh Male Voice Choir, current musical director for the Welsh Rugby Union and the British and Irish Lions rugby union team.
- Aneirin Hughes – Actor, singer and conductor.

== Recent performances ==
Haydn James has been musical director at the Welsh Rugby Union and asked the Mads and ex-members to perform at the Millennium Stadium for the Wales v. South Africa Rugby Union match on 13 November 2010. The Elizabethan Madrigal Singers regularly take their music overseas, recently travelling to Kraków, Poland, in June 2015. Previous tours include Martin, Slovakia in 2014, Burgos, Spain in 2013, Friedrichshafen, Germany, in 2012 and Ireland in 2011. In addition to annual tours, in 2012 'The Mads' were invited to perform at Aberystwyth University's graduation ceremonies every year, continuing a tradition that was established in the choir's infancy. Their most recent tour took them to Prague, Czech Republic 2016 and they are currently planning a tour to Germany 2018.
