= Project Archangel (radio serial) =

- Genre: Drama
- Running time: 30 minutes
- Country of origin: United Kingdom
- Language: English
- Home station: BBC Radio 4 Extra; BBC Radio 7
- Starring: Dan Hagley, Emily Chennery, Sunny Ormonde
- Written by: Jenny Stephens
- Original release: 2010
- No. of episodes: 4
- Audio format: Stereophonic sound

Project Archangel is a radio serial broadcast by the BBC. It is a sequel to Project Raphael. It mixes science fiction, supernatural and espionage themes in a story about a government agency that attempts to use "revenants", or ghosts of recently dead people, as agents in a conflict with an organization known as "The Nablovsky Colony", which apparently already has the ability to penetrate secret installations with their own ghosts. It was written by Jenny Stephens, and consists of four 30 minute episodes.

== Plot summary ==
The main characters of Project Raphael appear in this story, as they are caught up in the machinations of Nablovsky agents' attempts to manipulate world financial and commodity markets. Several attempts are made to kidnap Malcolm Holmes, a young man living in a small Yorkshire town. Malcolm has psychic abilities, which brought him to the attention of British Intelligence agency MI7, who needed him to successfully reach out to their own ghost agent Raphael.

Malcolm and Polly Williams, a local journalist, are eventually tricked into boarding a plane that takes them to Moscow, where they are brought by Nablovsky team member Victor to a hideout in the sewer system. There they meet the Nablovsky ghost agent, who turns out to be Malcolm's long-absent father Michael. He has amassed a huge fortune from financial manipulation, which is protected by a DNA-based lock that he can no longer access, since he was killed. Being Michael's biological son, Malcolm can open the account, which will allow the conspirators to drain the account, and Polly is kept hostage to force Malcolm to comply.

Malcolm's mother, Moira, arrives in Moscow along with an MI7 agent named Winston and with an unexpected package: a case that contains the ghost agent Raphael. A further twist happens when Malcolm successfully accesses the account, because the funds don't go to into the hands of the Nablovsky agents as expected. Instead they are scattered into millions of different accounts around the world as planned by Michael. Larger sums are directed to several charities, and forty-four thousand pounds to his surviving family.

== Cast ==
- Malcolm Holmes - Dan Hagley
- Polly Williams - Emily Chennery
- Moira, Malcolm's mother - Sunny Ormonde
- Agent Raphael - John Flitcroft
