= William Mathias =

Welsh composer (1934–1992)

William Mathias CBE
- Born: William James Mathias; 1 November 1934; Whitland, Carmarthenshire, Wales
- Died: 29 July 1992 (aged 57); Menai Bridge, Gwynedd, Wales
- Occupation: Composer
- Organizations: North Wales International Music Festival

William James Mathias CBE (1 November 1934 – 29 July 1992) was a Welsh composer noted for choral works.

== Biography ==
William Mathias was born in Whitland, Carmarthenshire. A child prodigy, he started playing the piano at the age of three and began composing at the age of five. At Aberystwyth University Mathias was a member of the Elizabethan Madrigal Singers and wrote 'Gloria in Excelsis Deo' for them in 1954. He studied at the Royal Academy of Music under Lennox Berkeley, where he was elected a Fellow in 1965. In 1968, he was awarded the Bax Society Prize of the Harriet Cohen International Music Award. He was professor of music and head of department in the University of Wales, Bangor, from 1970 until 1988.

His compositions include large scale works, including an opera, The Servants (1980), three symphonies and three piano concertos. Much of his music was written for the Anglican choral tradition, most famously the anthem Let the people praise Thee, O God written for the July 1981 royal wedding of the Prince and Princess of Wales, which had a television audience of an estimated 1 billion people worldwide.

Mathias wrote his Sinfonietta – initially called Dance Suite – for the Leicestershire Schools Symphony Orchestra (LSSO) in late 1966, and it received its first performance at Leicester De Montfort Hall during the 1967 Schools Festival. It was also included in the orchestra's tour programme for Denmark and Germany later in the year. The LSSO made the first commercial recording of Sinfonietta for the Pye Golden Guinea label in July 1967 under the direction of the composer (see external links below).

He founded the North Wales International Music Festival in St Asaph in 1972 and directed it until his death, aged 57, in 1992.

He died at Menai Bridge, Gwynedd and is buried at St Asaph Cathedral, St Asaph, Denbighshire, North Wales.

== List of works ==
=== Opera ===
- The Servants, Op. 81 (1980) libretto by Iris Murdoch

=== Orchestral ===
- Symphonies
  - Symphony No. 1, Op. 31 (1966)
  - Symphony No. 2 "Summer Music", Op. 90 (1983)
  - Symphony No. 3 (1991)
- Divertimento for String Orchestra, Op. 7 (1958)
- Music for Strings, Op. 14 (1961)
- Dance Overture, Op. 16 (1961)
- Invocation and Dance, Op. 17 (1961)
- Serenade for Small Orchestra, Op. 18 (1961)
- Prelude, Aria and Finale, for String Orchestra, Op. 25 (1964)
- Sinfonietta, Op. 34 (1967)
- Litanies, Op. 37 (1967)
- Festival Overture, Op. 42 (1969)
- Intrada, Op. 54 (1971)
- Holiday Overture, Op. 57 (1971)
- Celtic Dances, Op. 60 (1972)
- Laudi, Op. 62 (1973)
- Vistas, Op. 69 (1975)
- Dance Variations, Op. 72 (1976)
- Melos, Op. 73 (1976)
- Vivat Regina, Suite for Brass Band, Op. 75 (1977)
- Helios, Op. 76 (1977)
- Requiescat, Op. 79 (1977)
- Reflections on a Theme of Tomkins, Op. 86 (1981)
- Anniversary Dances, Op. 95 (1985)
- Threnos, for String Orchestra (1990)
- In Arcadia (1992)

=== Concertante ===
- Piano Concerto No. 1, Op. 2 (1955; rev. 1992)
- Piano Concerto No. 2, Op. 13 (1960)
- Concerto for Orchestra, Op. 27 (1964)
- Piano Concerto No. 3, Op. 40 (1968)
- Harp Concerto, Op. 50 (1970)
- Harpsichord Concerto, Op. 56 (1971)
- Clarinet Concerto, Op. 68 (1975)
- Organ Concerto, Op. 91 (1984)
- Horn Concerto, Op. 93 (1984)
- Oboe Concerto (1989)
- Violin Concerto (1992)
- Flute Concerto (1992)

=== Chamber ===
- Divertimento for violin and Viola, Op. 1
- Sonatina for clarinet and piano, Op. 3
- Violin Sonata No. 1, Op. 15
- Wind Quintet, Op. 22 (1963)
- Divertimento, Op. 24 for flute, oboe and piano
- Piano Trio, Op. 30
- String Quartet No.1, Op. 38
- Concertino for flute, oboe, bassoon and harpsichord, Op. 65
- Zodiac Trio for flute, viola and harp, Op. 70 (1976)
- String Quartet No. 2, Op. 84
- Violin Sonata No. 2, Op. 94
- Sonatina for Flute and Piano, Op. 98 (1953, revised 1986)
- String Quartet No. 3 (1987)
- Soundings for brass quintet
- Summer Dances for brass quintet

=== Instrumental ===
- Suite for Trumpet and Piano, Op. 4 (1956)
- Improvisations for Harp Op. 10 (1960)
- Piano Sonata No.1, Op. 23 (1963)
- Piano Sonata No.2, Op. 46 (1969)
- Sonata for Harp, Op. 66
- Santa Fe Suite for harp (1988)
- Sonatina for Flute, Op. 98 (1953)
- Toccata alla Danza for piano (1961)

=== Organ ===
- Prelude, Elegy and Toccata (1954)
- Partita, Op. 19 (1962)
- Variations on a Hymn Tune, Op. 20 (1962)
- Postlude (1962)
- Processional (1964)
- Chorale (Easter 1966)
- Invocations, Op. 35 (1967) commissioned by the Dean and Chapter of Liverpool Cathedral and dedicated to Dr Noel Rawsthorne for the inauguration of the organ at Liverpool Metropolitan Cathedral in 1967.
- Toccata Giocosa, Op. 36, No. 2 (1967) dedicated to Sir David Willcocks on the occasion of his inauguration of the new organ at the Royal College of Organists, 7 October 1967
- Jubilate, Op. 67, No. 2 (1974) dedicated to Michael Smythe
- Fantasy, Op. 78 (1978)
- Canzonetta, Op. 78, No. 2 (1978)
- Antiphonies, Op. 88, No. 2 (1982)
- Berceuse, Op. 95, No. 3 (1985)
- Recessional, Op. 96, No. 4 (1986) dedicated to Christopher Morris, musician, publisher, friend
- Fanfare (1987)
- Carillon (1989)
- Fenestra (1989)

=== Choral ===
- Alleluia! Christ is Risen! (1986)
- All Thy Works Shall Praise Thee for choir and organ, Op. 17b
- Saint Teilo, cantata for narrator, contralto and tenor solo, boys' and girls' choirs, mixed chorus, organ and chamber orchestra, Op. 21 (Commissioned by and premiered at the 1963 Llandaff Cathedral Festival)
- Make a joyful noise, Op. 26, No. 2
- Festival Te Deum for choir and organ, Op. 28 (1964)
- O Sing Unto the Lord for choir and organ, Op. 29
- Three Medieval Lyrics for choir and instrumental ensemble, Op. 33
- An Admonition to Rulers, Op. 43
- Psalm 150 for choir and orchestra, Op. 44
- Lift Up Your Heads, O Ye Gates, Op. 44, No. 2 (1969)
- Ave Rex, Op. 45
- Sir Christèmas (Part of Ave Rex, Op. 45)
- O Salutaris Hostia for male voices, Op. 48
- Bless the Lord for choir and organ, Op. 51
- Gloria for male voices and organ, Op. 52
- Jesus College Service, Op. 53 (1970)
- A Babe is Born, Op. 55 (1971)
- Alleluya Psallat for choir and organ, Op. 58
- Elegy for a Prince for voice and orchestra, Op. 59
- A Vision of Time and Eternity for contralto and piano, Op. 61
- Ceremony After a Fire Raid for choir, piano and percussion, Op. 63
- Missa Brevis for choir and organ, Op. 64 (1973)
- This Worlde's Joie, Op. 67 (1974)
- The Fields of Praise for tenor and piano, Op. 74
- A Royal Garland for choir, Op. 77
- Nativity Carol, Op. 77, No. 3 (part of A Royal Garland)
- A May Magnificat for choir and bells, Op. 79, No. 2
- Shakespeare Songs for choir and piano, Op. 80
- Songs of William Blake for voice, harp, piano, celesta and string orchestra, Op. 82
- Rex Gloriae for choir, Op. 83 (1980)
- Te Deum for soprano, mezzo-soprano, tenor soli, choir and orchestra, Op. 85
- Let the People Praise Thee O God for choir and organ/ orchestra, Op. 87
- Lux Aeterna, Op. 88 (No. 1)
- All Wisdom is from the Lord for choir and organ Op. 88, No. 3 (1982)
- Salvator Mundi for SSA, piano duet, percussion and strings Op. 89
- O Be Joyful in the Lord for choir and organ, Op. 90, No. 2 (1983)
- Let Us Now Praise Famous Men for choir and organ/ orchestra, Op. 91, No.2
- Missa Aedis Christi (in Memory of William Walton) for choir and organ, Op. 92
- The Echoing Green for SSAA, Op. 95, No.2
- Veni Sancte Spiritus for choir, organ, 2 trumpets and percussion, Op. 96
- Let All the World in Every Corner Sing, Op. 96, No. 2
- Rejoice the Lamb for choir and organ, Op. 99, No. 1
- Cantate Domino for choir and organ (1987)
- Riddles (1987)
- As Truly as God is our Father for choir and organ (1987)
- Sweet was the Song for choir and organ (1988)
- Jonah: A Musical Morality for baritone and tenor soli, semi chorus, choir, and orchestra (1988)
- O Aula Nobilis for SSAA, trumpets, percussion, and piano duet (1989)
- World's Fire for soprano and baritone soli, choir and orchestra (1989)
- Let the People Praise Thee, O God, for the wedding of Prince Charles and Lady Diana Spencer, Op. 87 (1981)
- Learsongs (1989)
- Bell Carol for choir, brass, percussion and organ (1989)
- The Doctrine of Wisdom for choir and organ (1990)
- Ave verum corpus for choir and organ (1992)
