= Y Pris =

- Genre: Crime drama
- Created by: Tim Price
- Written by: Heledd Hardy; Sharon Morgan
- Directed by: Gareth Bryn; Ed Talfan
- Starring: Matthew Gravelle; Aled Pugh; Jâms Thomas; James Thomas; Philip Madoc; Dyfrig Morris; Rhodri Meilir; Mark Lewis Jones; Nia Roberts; Gillian Elisa
- Opening theme: "Y Pris" – Rob Love of Alabama 3
- Composers: Hugh Fowler; John E.R. Hardy
- Country of origin: United Kingdom (Wales)
- Original language: Welsh
- No. of series: 2
- No. of episodes: 21

Production
- Executive producers: Ed Thomas; Angharad Jones
- Producer: Fizzy Oppè
- Cinematography: Peter Thornton; Huw Walters; Steve Lawes
- Editors: Wendi Rowlands; Jane Murrell
- Running time: 45 minutes
- Production company: Fiction Factory

Original release
- Network: S4C
- Release: 31 October 2007 – 21 May 2009

Y Pris (English: The Price) is a Welsh television crime drama, produced by Fiction Factory for Welsh public service television station S4C. The series, described in its tagline as "The Sopranos by the seaside", is set in Carmarthenshire and follows the "tangled lives of a group of gangsters who hide their illicit dealings". The series was written and created by Tim Price.

The first series comprises thirteen episodes. It was filmed in March and April 2007. The second series, comprising eight episodes, was commissioned by S4C in 2008 and filmed later the same year for broadcast in 2009. The series is, together with Caerdydd, Cowbois ac Injans, and Con Passionate, part of S4C's drama editor Angharad Jones' drive to reach a younger audience for the station. The series' theme was written and recorded by Alabama 3 lead singer Rob Love. All twenty-one episodes are available to stream on S4C's website. All episodes are fully subtitled in both Welsh and English. Episodes from the second series also carry audio description.

== Reception ==
In 2008, Y Pris was nominated for the Prix Europa in the "Best Drama Series" category. Y Pris has received five nominations for the 2008 Bafta Cymru awards: Best Screenwriter for Tim Price, Best Actor for Matthew Gravelle, Best Drama Director for Gareth Bryn, Best Sound for Gareth Meiron, Simon H. Jones, and Darren Jones, and Best Original Music Soundtrack for John Hardy and Rob Love. Y Pris won the Best Original Music Soundtrack award for John Hardy and Rob Love. At the 2009 Celtic Media Festival Awards, the series won the award for "Best Drama Series". At the 2009 Bafta Cymru awards, Y Pris was nominated for four awards, including Gareth Bryn for Best Drama Director, Peter Thornton for Best Director of Drama Photography, Nel Bat for Best Make-Up, and Haydn Pearce for Best Design.

== Cast ==
- Matthew Gravelle as Lyn Edwards
- Aled Pugh as Bryn Pritchard
- Jâms Thomas as Ieuan Morris
- James Thomas as Twrch
- Philip Madoc as Y "The President" Llywydd
- Dyfrig Morris as Billy the Pimp
- Rhodri Meilir as Steve John
- Mark Lewis Jones as Chief Constable Bryan Jones
- Nia Roberts as Kirsti O'Shea
- Gillian Elisa as Anne
- Phylip Harries as Alan Philips
- Gareth John Bale as Keith
- Huw Ceredig as Rhidian Edwards
- Menna Trussler as Mam Edwards
- Dafydd Hywel as Clive Owen
- Sara Lloyd-Gregory as Llio Edwards
- Vincent Walsh as Fionn
- Gareth Pierce as Nicky (Series 2)

=== Supporting ===
- Mari Ann Bull as Chloe
- Catrin Arwel as Ruth
- Gareth Milton as Ian Blake
- William Thomas as Davey Eddy
- Iwan John as PC Ray Richards
- Rhodri Miles as PC Rory Brown
- Gerry O'Brien as Mr. O'Shea
- Alun ap Brinley as Prins William
- Iola Hughes as Julia
- Rhys Parry Jones as Big Phil
- Maria Pride as Tara
- Sara Harris-Davies as Mrs. Blake
- Gordon Warnecke as Agent Macintosh
- Gareth Potter as Oscar
- Heledd Baskerville as Caitlin Hughes
- Fran Brennan as Peter Perry
- Owen Garmon as Preacher Gruffudd Hughes
- Bethan Morgan as Carla
- Hannah Morley as Hannah
- Mair Rowlands as Siwan
- Michael Smiley as Captain
- Gareth Blake as Keith Bradbury
- Emily Tucker as "Mouse" Llygoden

== Episodes ==
=== Series 1 (2007–2008) ===
No.	Title	Directed by	Written by	Original release date	Welsh viewers (million)
1	"Episode 1"	Unknown	Unknown	31 October 2007	N/A
2	"Episode 2"	Unknown	Unknown	7 November 2007	N/A
3	"Episode 3"	Unknown	Unknown	14 November 2007	N/A
4	"Episode 4"	Unknown	Unknown	21 November 2007	N/A
5	"Episode 5"	Unknown	Unknown	28 November 2007	N/A
6	"Episode 6"	Unknown	Unknown	5 December 2007	N/A
7	"Episode 7"	Unknown	Unknown	12 December 2007	N/A
8	"Episode 8"	Unknown	Unknown	19 December 2007	N/A
9	"Episode 9"	Unknown	Unknown	26 December 2007	N/A
10	"Episode 10"	Unknown	Unknown	2 January 2008	N/A
11	"Episode 11"	Unknown	Unknown	9 January 2008	N/A
12	"Episode 12"	Unknown	Unknown	16 January 2008	N/A
13	"Episode 13"	Unknown	Unknown	23 January 2008	N/A

=== Series 2 (2009) ===
No.	Title	Directed by	Written by	Original release date	Welsh viewers (million)
1	"Episode 1"	Dave Evans	Unknown	2 April 2009	N/A
2	"Episode 2"	Dave Evans	Unknown	9 April 2009	N/A
3	"Episode 3"	Dave Evans	Unknown	16 April 2009	N/A
4	"Episode 4"	Dave Evans	Unknown	23 April 2009	N/A
5	"Episode 5"	Unknown	Unknown	30 April 2009	N/A
6	"Episode 6"	Unknown	Unknown	7 May 2009	N/A
7	"Episode 7"	Unknown	Unknown	14 May 2009	N/A
8	"Episode 8"	Unknown	Unknown	21 May 2009	N/A
