= Gillian Elisa =

Welsh actress, singer, and comedian

- Born: Gillian Elizabeth Thomas; 10 August 1953 (age 73); Carmarthen, Wales
- Education: Royal Welsh College of Music & Drama
- Occupation: Actress
- Years active: 1978-present

Gillian Elizabeth Thomas (born 10 August 1953) is a Welsh actress, singer, and comedian. Early in her career she was known as Gillian Elisa Thomas.

== Early life and education ==
Elisa was born in Carmarthen, Wales, and brought up in Lampeter; she began acting before she started school. As a sixth-former at Ysgol Gyfun Llanbedr-Pont Steffan in Lampeter, she co-wrote a Welsh-language musical, Yr Enfys (The Rainbow). After leaving school, she studied at the Welsh College of Music and Drama in Cardiff.

== Career ==
In 1975, she was chosen by producer Endaf Emlyn to play the lead in a Welsh-language rock opera. Since that time, she has been a well-known figure on Welsh-language television.

On S4C television, she played (1974–2010) the part of Sabrina Daniels in the long-running soap Pobol y Cwm and the comic character "Mrs O.T.T." in the variety entertainment programme Noson Lawen. She appeared in the gangster drama series Y Pris. She has performed one-woman comedy shows at the Edinburgh Festival. As a singer, she has completed three albums of new and traditional Welsh songs – Rhywbeth yn y Glas, Haul ar Nos Hir, and Lawr Y Lein, as well as appearing on a number of other recordings.

She is best known to English-speaking audiences for her leading role in the 2018 drama series Hidden, which was filmed in both Welsh and English, Elisa travelled around Wales with fellow actress Ruth Jones as part of the Welsh language show Iaith ar Daith, which shows celebrities learning Welsh and putting it to practice.

== Filmography ==
=== Film ===
Year	Title	Role	Notes
1986	Coming Up Roses	Sian	
1991	Body Beautiful	Sonia / Shopkeeper / Beryl's Mom	
1997	Twin Town	Pat	
1999	The Last Seduction II	Barbara	
2012	Rain: An Original Musical	Mrs. Coots	
2014	Billy Elliot the Musical Live	Alternate Grandma / Ensemble	
2019	2nd Date Sex	Val	
2022	Save the Cinema	Town clerk	

=== Television ===
Year	Title	Role	Notes
1978	Hawkmoor	Elinor	Episode #1.2
1978	Dylan	Lady in Swansea pub	Television film
1979	Heyday in the Blood	Beti	Television film
1979	Border Country	Beti	Television film
1980, 2004	Pobol y Cwm	Sabrina Daniels	2 episodes
1981	The Life and Times of David Lloyd George	Anita	4 episodes
1981	Taff Acre	Yvonne Jenkins	10 episodes
1984	The Magnificent Evans	Dorinda	Episode #1.2
1988	The Snow Spider	Mrs. Davies	2 episodes
1990	Screen One	Phoebe	Episode: "Sticky Wickets"
1991	A Mind to Kill	WPS Alison	Television film
1992	Forever Green	Mary Powell	Episode #2.9
1992	The Winter Stallion	Mrs. Howard	Television film
1994–1997	A Mind to Kill	WPS Alison	13 episodes
1995, 1996	Gogs	Voice	2 episodes
1998	Mortimer's Law	Jane Harris	2 episodes
2007	High Hopes	Chlamydia	Episode: "Dead Man Walking"
2007	Y Pris	Anne	5 episodes
2007, 2009	Gavin & Stacey	Welsh Nationalist / Lingerie Lady	2 episodes
2009	Ar y Tracs	Eluned Hughes	Television film
2010	Sherlock	Surgery Receptionist	Episode: "The Blind Banker"
2011	Ar y Tracs: Y Tren i'r Gem	Eluned Hughes	Television film
2011	Zanzibar	Eiriona	Episode #1.6
2011–2012	Alys	Heulwen	16 episodes
2015–2017	Stella	Nana Pat / Mrs. Evans	6 episodes
2017	Bang	Liz	2 episodes
2018	Hidden	Iona Harris	7 episodes
2019	35 Awr	Val	8 episodes
2020	Holby City	Grace Allan	Episode #22.14
2021	The Pact	Gwen	3 episodes
2021	Jam	Mags	4 episodes
