= Rancid Aluminium =

- Theatrical release poster
- Directed by: Ed Thomas
- Written by: James Hawes
- Produced by: Mark Thomas; Mike Parker
- Starring: Joseph Fiennes; Rhys Ifans; Tara FitzGerald; Sadie Frost; Nick Moran
- Cinematography: Tony Imi
- Edited by: Chris Lawrence
- Production company: Ballpark Productions
- Distributed by: Entertainment Film Distributors (UK and Ireland); Good Machine International (International)
- Release date: 20 January 2000
- Running time: 91 minutes
- Country: United Kingdom
- Language: English
- Budget: $12,000,000
- Box office: $4,300,000

Rancid Aluminium is a film based on the 1998 novel of the same name by James Hawes. It was released on 21 January 2000.

== Cast ==
- Rhys Ifans
- Joseph Fiennes
- Tara FitzGerald
- Sadie Frost
- Steven Berkoff
- Olegar Fedoro
- Keith Allen
- Dani Behr
- Andrew Howard
- Nick Moran
- Brian Hibbard
- Steve Speirs

== Critical reception ==
Reviews of Rancid Aluminium were strongly negative. Peter Bradshaw of The Guardian said: "This film succeeds in getting its cast - some of the brightest and best of British character actors, young and old - to give the worst performances imaginable... The plot is all over the place, eventually incomprehensible, and very, very boring." Cosmo Landesman, writing in The Sunday Times also gave the film a negative review, describing the film as "a stupid, unfunny and self-satisfied film that should be avoided at all costs". Anne Billson of The Sunday Telegraph found the film confusing and derivative: "I couldn't even work out where the film is supposed to be set. Isn't that Portobello Road? Why is Tara Fitzgerald talking about Exeter? And how in hell did we get to this cricket pavilion? Director Ed Thomas appears to have been aiming for the Lock, Stock and Two Smoking Barrels crowd, but misses by several billion miles." Some years later, Hawes himself described his own adaptation as "a terrible screenplay".

Discussing Rancid Aluminium in an article on British cinema, Jacques Peretti gave an equally harsh assessment: "In many ways, Rancid Aluminium is beyond criticism because it is very hard, even after several viewings, to work out what the hell is going on" and that it was "incomprehensible and deeply lacklustre in all departments." Noting the film's negative reception, Peretti went on to argue: "By universal consent, it is the worst film ever made in the UK."
