= Aneirin Hughes =

Welsh actor and singer

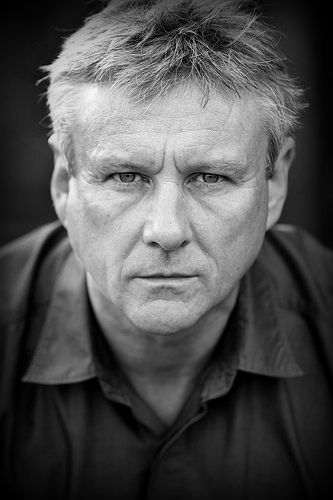
- Hughes in 2013
- Born: Aneurin Hughes; 8 May 1958 (age 68); Aberystwyth, Wales
- Education: Royal Conservatoire of Scotland
- Occupations: Actor, singer
- Years active: 1994–present

Aneirin Hughes (born Aneurin Hughes, 8 May 1958) is a Welsh actor and singer known for playing Chief Superintendent Brian Prosser in the BBC4 Welsh police drama Hinterland. He won a Best Actor BAFTA Cymru (or BAFTA Wales) for his appearance as Delme in Cameleon (1997), a Welsh language film.

== Education ==
Hughes was born in Aberystwyth, where he studied music at the University College of Wales under Professor Ian Parrott and sang with the soprano Hazel Holt. While a music student he conducted the university chamber choir, the Aberystwyth Elizabethan Madrigal Singers, for several years. Hughes went on to study at the Royal Scottish Academy of Music and Drama winning the Baritone Prize and both the Hugh S. Robertson Prize for Conducting and Vocal Ensemble. He was also a founder member of the Academy Strings and a recipient of the Leach Foundation Prize.

== Acting career ==
Hughes began his acting career in 1994 in the BBC Wales soap opera Pobol y Cwm. He went on to appear in Blood on the Dole, Casualty, Family Affairs as DI Patrick Grenham, Spooks, Take Me with Robson Green and EastEnders in January and April 2009 as Andy Jones, the adoptive father of Danielle Jones. He reprised the role in June 2016.

Hughes won a Best Actor BAFTA Cymru (or BAFTA Wales) for his appearance as Delme in Cameleon (1997), a Welsh language film. He appeared regularly in Judge John Deed as Neil Haughton and in Young Dracula as Graham Branagh. He played Harper in the TV movie Harper and Isles with Hywel Bennett and appeared in the 1998 film The Theory of Flight with Kenneth Branagh. More recently, he appeared in the S4C drama Pen Talar and in Holby City as Sir Fraser Anderson, and has also returned to the BBC Wales soap opera Pobol y Cwm as a new character, Morgan 'Moc' Thomas, whom he played from 2012 to 2013. He reprised the role in 2017. In 2012, he portrayed the politician and Welsh-language campaigner Gwynfor Evans in an S4C docu-drama, titled Gwynfor Evans: Y Penderfyniad? (The Decision?).

In 2013, Hughes appeared in the S4C film Y Syrcas (The Circus). He held a major role throughout the bilingually-filmed detective programme Y Gwyll (Hinterland), appearing as Detective Superintendent Brian Prosser in all three series from 2013 to 2016. In May 2014 he appeared as Organ Morgan with Tom Jones and Katherine Jenkins in Kevin Allen's BBC centenary production of Under Milk Wood by Dylan Thomas. Hughes has also appeared as Tom Howells in the Welsh thriller television series Keeping Faith (2017) and as builder Bill Thornhill – an old rival of local villain Pat Phelan (Connor McIntyre) — in Coronation Street (2018).

In 2022 Hughes appeared in the video game Elden Ring as the giant blacksmith Iji.

== Personal life ==
Hughes has run several marathons for charity, including for Bloodwise.

He is a founding member of the Monmouth Male Voice Choir.
