= Eve Myles =

Welsh actress (born 1978)

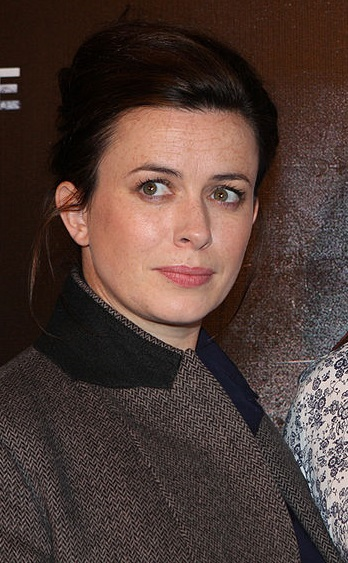
- Myles at the Sydney premiere of Man of Steel, 2013
- Born: 26 July 1978 (age 48); Ystradgynlais, Powys, Wales
- Education: Royal Welsh College of Music & Drama
- Occupation: Actress
- Years active: 1999–present
- Known for: Torchwood; Doctor Who; Broadchurch
- Spouse: Bradley Freegard (m. 2013)
- Children: 3

Eve Myles (born 26 July 1978) is a Welsh actress. Her television roles include Ceri Lewis in the long-running BBC Wales drama series Belonging (2000–2009), Gwen Cooper in the BBC science-fiction series Torchwood (2006–2011), and Faith Howells in the bilingually produced BBC/S4C drama series Keeping Faith/Un Bore Mercher (2017–2020).

Myles graduated from the Royal Welsh College of Music & Drama in 2000. Later that year, she began playing Ceri Lewis in the BBC Wales-produced drama series Belonging, a role she was to continue with until the end of the series in 2009. Her early UK-wide television credits included the 2001 miniseries Tales from Pleasure Beach and the 2003 television drama Colditz. In 2005, she auditioned for a part in the revived series of Doctor Who, and landed the role of servant girl Gwyneth, in the series 1 episode "The Unquiet Dead", alongside Billie Piper and Christopher Eccleston. Her appearance in Doctor Who led to her winning a lead role in the science-fiction drama's spin-off series Torchwood, in which she portrayed the character Gwen Cooper for four series between 2006 and 2011. Her role in Torchwood earned her a BAFTA Cymru award for Best Actress in 2007.

Myles' subsequent television credits include the 2008 miniseries Little Dorrit, the 2008 premiere episode of the fantasy drama Merlin and the title role in the 2013 drama series Frankie. In 2013, for the TV channel GOLD, she appeared alongside Anthony Head in the comedy-drama You, Me & Them, in a role she reprised in 2015 for the second series. In 2014, she was cast in the second series of the crime drama series Broadchurch, portraying Claire Ripley. In 2011, she voiced one of the main characters in the video game Dragon Age II. In 2016, she once again played a Victorian servant, this time Mrs. Jenkins in the ITV period drama series Victoria; she did not reprise the role for series 2.

Myles is also a theatre actress, winning an Ian Charleson Award in 2004 for her performances in Royal Shakespeare Company productions of the plays Titus Andronicus and The Taming of the Shrew. Further theatre credits include both Henry IV, Part 1 and Henry IV, Part 2 at the National Theatre in 2004, and the role of Emma in the first UK run of Zach Braff's play All New People in 2012.

== Early life ==
Myles was born on 26 July 1978 in Ystradgynlais, Wales. Her father is Scottish. She attended Ysgol Maesydderwen, where she learned only basic Welsh phrases. In 2000, Myles gained a Bachelor of Arts in acting at the Royal Welsh College of Music & Drama in Cardiff. She then moved to London.

== Career ==
In 2000, Myles took on the central role of Ceri Owen (née Lewis) in the BBC Wales drama Belonging. Her longest role to date, Myles played Ceri from the series' first episode through to its final series in 2008, returning for a one-off special in 2009. In 2001, Myles undertook a role in the television film Score and the TV miniseries Tales from Pleasure Beach. From 2003, Myles based herself in Stratford-upon-Avon, playing Lavinia in the Royal Shakespeare Company production of Titus Andronicus and Bianca in The Taming of The Shrew, for both of which she received the Sunday Times Ian Charleson award in 2004. In 2005, appeared opposite Michael Gambon in Henry IV, Part I and II at the National Theatre. She took the part of Gwenfar in the BBC Radio Four series of plays "Arthur" by Sebastian Baczkiewicz and Steve May in November 2004. Myles appeared in the ITV drama Colditz in 2005.

She took a supporting role in the Doctor Who episode "The Unquiet Dead", playing servant girl Gwyneth. This brought her to the attention of lead writer Russell T Davies, who went on to create and produce Torchwood. Considering her to be "one of Wales' best-kept secrets", Davies wrote the role of Gwen Cooper in Torchwood specifically for Myles. Speaking on her casting, Myles stated that having the part written for her was like having her "own personal Oscar." Gwen, an audience surrogate character, is characterised by Myles as Torchwood's "social worker", who "can run and fight and stand in her own corner and win." Her role in Torchwood also led to Myles making a second appearance in Doctor Who, for its Fourth series' finale, alongside Torchwood co-stars John Barrowman and Gareth David-Lloyd. Myles appeared in every episode of Torchwood.

Myles also appeared in the first episode of Merlin, "The Dragon's Call", where she played Lady Helen of Mora and Mary Collins, a witch who impersonated her. Her performance in this role was described positively by Anthony Head, who said that "she did it dead straight and very scarily. There was one moment she was delivering a speech to me in full prosthetic make-up... The French background artists didn't speak English but burst into applause at the end because they were moved by the emotion of it."

She portrayed the character of Maggy Plornish in Andrew Davies' 2008 adaptation of Little Dorrit, which later went on to win seven Emmy awards. Early 2008 also saw the actress host a radio show centred around Welsh boxer Joe Calzaghe and narrate a short story, Sorry for the Loss by Bridget Keehan, both airing on BBC Radio Wales.

2009 saw her star in the independent Welsh film A Bit of Tom Jones, as well as the one-off drama Framed for BBC Wales, alongside Trevor Eve. In July 2010, Myles announced she would appear in an original BBC Cymru Wales TV series, Baker Boys, co-written by Helen Raynor and Gary Owen and airing in early 2011. 2011 also saw Myles provide the voice of the Dalish elf Merrill in the Bioware video game Dragon Age II. In July 2011, to coincide with Torchwood's fourth series Myles presented part of a BBC Wales Documentary entitled Wales and Hollywood, which featured the actress travelling to the Hollywood Walk of Fame to find the Welsh talent honoured there.

In 2012 Myles returned to the stage in Zach Braff's play All New People, which ran for ten consecutive weeks at the West End's Duke of York's Theatre following runs at the Manchester Opera House (8–11 February 2012) and the King's Theatre in Glasgow (14–18 February). In 2013 she took the title role in the BBC1 drama Frankie, filmed in Bristol, which follows the life of a district nurse who cares more about her patients than her own life.

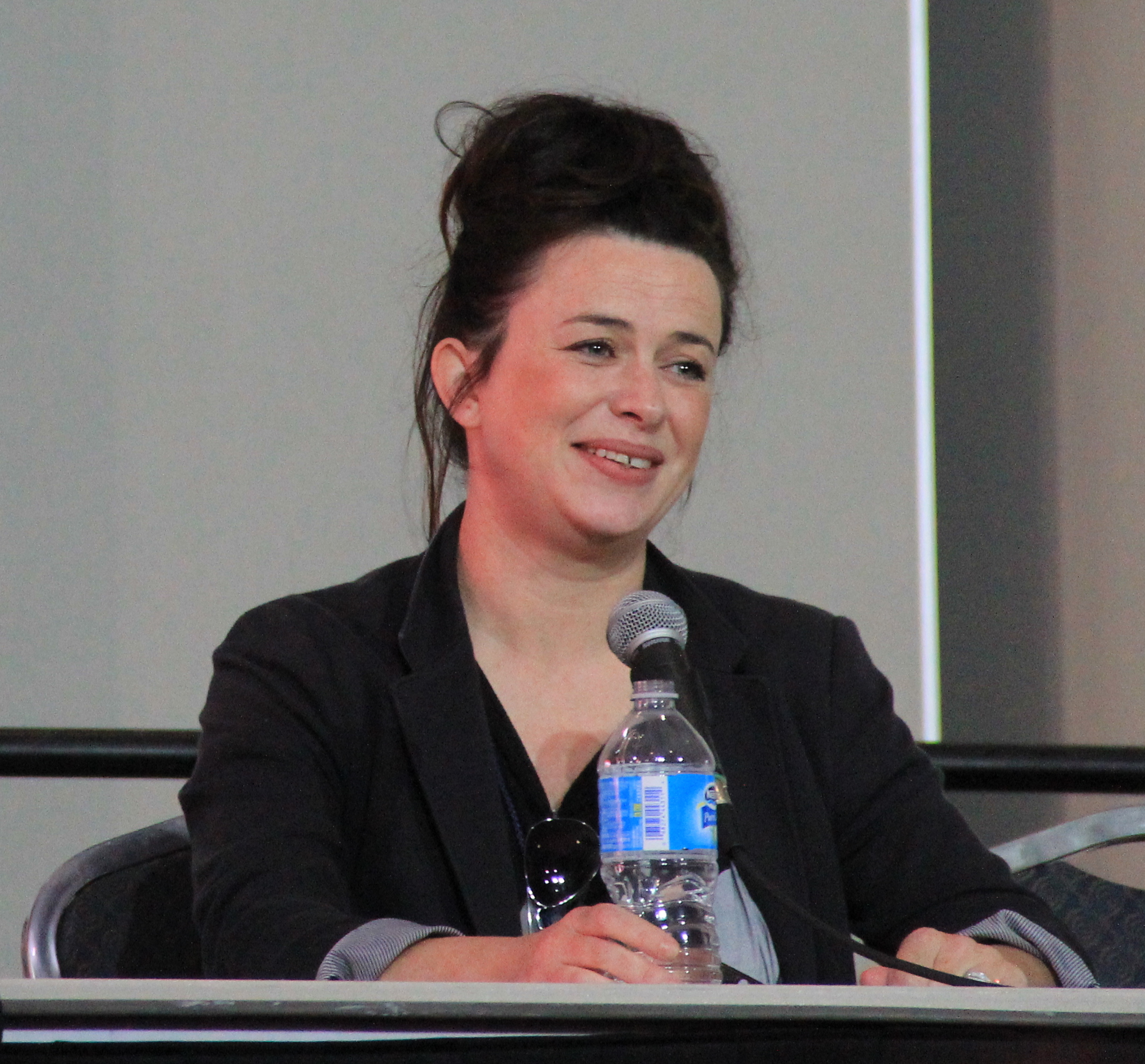
Eve Myles in 2016

In August 2016, Myles appeared alongside Jenna Coleman, Tom Hughes and Rufus Sewell in the ITV drama Victoria, which follows the early life of Queen Victoria from her ascension to the throne at the age of 18, through to her courtship and marriage to Prince Albert of Saxe-Coburg and Gotha. She portrayed Mrs Jenkins, the Queen's personal dresser.

In 2017, Myles starred alongside her real life husband Bradley Freegard in the Welsh drama Un Bore Mercher for S4C. She learnt to speak Welsh for the role. Un Bore Mercher was also filmed in English and aired the following year on BBC One as Keeping Faith. Myles played Faith Howells, a solicitor whose husband Evan, with whom she works at their family-run law firm, disappears whilst she is on maternity leave following the birth of their third child. The show was a runaway success for the BBC and the second series was broadcast 2019 on S4C in May–June and on BBC One in July–August.

In 2018, Myles played the role of Norman Scott's lover Gwen Parry-Jones in the BBC drama A Very English Scandal. The drama relates the real-life story of politician Jeremy Thorpe's affair with Scott and subsequent trial for attempted murder, based on the novel of the same name by John Preston.

== Awards and recognition ==
Myles was among many others nominated for Wales online Dafftas' best actress and won for her role as Frankie with almost 45% of the votes. Myles was nominated for and won Wales' sexiest woman in 2013.

Myles has been nominated for a total of six BAFTA Cymru awards, winning one. In 2002, 2003, and 2009, Myles was nominated for Best Actress in the BAFTA Cymru Awards for her role as Ceri on the BBC Wales drama Belonging.

In 2007, Myles won the BAFTA Cymru Best Actress award for her portrayal of Gwen Cooper in Torchwood's first series, a role she also received Best Actress BAFTA Cymru nominations for in 2008 and 2010. In 2010, Myles won the Best Actress award in the SFX Reader's awards poll, and was crowned best actress in the 11th annual Airlock Alpha Portal Awards. For her role as Gwen Cooper in Torchwood: Miracle Day, Myles was nominated for a Satellite Awards in the Best Television Actress category. and reached the shortlist for the 2012 UK National Television Awards.

In 2006, Wales on Sunday named Myles as its "Bachelorette of the Year". Myles also regularly ranks highly in the Western Mail's annual list of the 50 sexiest women in Wales. In 2005, the Western Mail ranked Myles seventh whilst she ranked fifth in 2008, 7th in 2009, 8th in 2010 and 10th in 2011.

In June 2010, Myles was honoured with a fellowship from the Royal Welsh College of Music & Drama.

== Personal life ==
Myles met Bradley Freegard at the National Youth Theatre in 1994, and they married in Italy on 18 May 2013. Myles and Freegard, who is also an actor, have three daughters. After learning Welsh for Keeping Faith with the assistance of her husband, she now speaks conversational Welsh with her daughters.

Filming Torchwood's fourth series in 2011 saw Myles move with her family to America's Hollywood Hills, living "literally underneath the Hollywood sign".

== Filmography ==
=== Film ===
Year	Title	Role	Notes
2005	Say It with Flowers	Leila Moon	Short film
2006	These Foolish Things	Dolly Nightingale	
2009	A Bit of Tom Jones?	Sally Fielding	
2017	Eat Locals	Vanessa	
2019	Creepy Pasta Salad	Voice role	Short film

=== Television ===
Year	Title	Role	Notes	Ref.
1999	Hang the DJ	Tracy		
2000	Nuts and Bolts	Carys Williams	Episode: #1.1	
2000–2009	Belonging	Ceri Owen (née Lewis)	85 episodes	
2001	Tales from Pleasure Beach	Angie	2 episodes	
2001	Score	Paula	TV film	
2003	EastEnders: Dot's Story	Young Gwen	TV special	
2005	Doctor Who	Gwyneth	Episode: "The Unquiet Dead"	
2005	Colditz	Jill	2 episodes	
2006	Soundproof	DC Sarah McGowan	TV film	
2006–2011	Torchwood	Gwen Cooper	Main role; 41 episodes	
2006–2008	Torchwood Declassified	Herself	18 episodes	
2008	Merlin	Lady Helen / Mary Collins	Episode: "The Dragon's Call"	
2008	Little Dorrit	Maggy Plornish	8 episodes	
2008	Doctor Who	Gwen Cooper	2 episodes: "The Stolen Earth" / "Journey's End"	
2009	Framed	Angharad Stannard	TV film	
2011	Wales and Hollywood	Presenter	Documentary	
2011	Baker Boys	Sarah	Main role; 6 episodes	
2013	Frankie	Frankie Maddox	Main role; 6 episodes	
2013–2015	You, Me & Them	Lauren Grey	Main role; 12 episodes	
2014	Under Milk Wood	Lilly Smalls	TV film	
2015	Broadchurch	Claire Ripley	8 episodes	
2016	Moving On	Helen	Episode: "Passengers"	
2016	Victoria	Mrs Jenkins	8 episodes	
2017–2020	Keeping Faith / Un Bore Mercher	Faith Howells	Main role; 20 episodes	
2018	A Very English Scandal	Gwen Parry-Jones	Episode: #1.2	
2018	To Provide All People	Domestic Assistant	TV film	
2019	Cold Feet	Caitlin Henderson	2 episodes	
2020–2022	We Hunt Together	DS Lola Franks	Main role; 12 episodes	
2023	Hijack	Alice Sinclair	Main role	
2025–present	The Crow Girl	Jeanette Kilburn	Main role	
2025	The Guest	Fran	Main role	
2025	Coldwater	Rebecca	6 episodes	
2025	The Hack	Jacqui Hames	Episodes: #1.2, #1.4, #1.6, #1.7	
2026	Gone	Detective Annie Cassidy	Main role; 6 episodes	

=== Radio and audio dramas ===
Year	Title	Role	Production
2004	Arthur	Gwenfar	BBC Radio 4
2005	The Sanctuary Seeker	Nesta	BBC Radio 4
2007	The Sixth Column Has Better Legs	Gloria	BBC Radio 4
2008	Calzaghe Fight Night	Presenter	BBC Radio Wales
2008	Sorry for the Loss	Narrator	BBC Radio 4
2008	"Lost Souls"	Gwen Cooper	BBC Radio 4
2009	"Asylum"	Gwen Cooper	BBC Radio 4
2009	"Golden Age"	Gwen Cooper	BBC Radio 4
2009	"The Dead Line"	Gwen Cooper	BBC Radio 4
2011	Torchwood: The Lost Files	Gwen Cooper	BBC Radio 4
2013	Terry Jones's Fairy Tales	Narrator	BBC Radio Wales
2015–2020, 2023	Torchwood	Gwen Cooper	Big Finish Productions
2015	Foursome	Lisa	BBC Radio 4
2015	Stupid Men	Kerry	BBC Radio 4
2015	Frank and the Bear	Amy	BBC Radio 4
2015	Fright Night: Ring	Toni	BBC Radio 4
2018	Blind Terror: The Gods of Frost	Kathryn Ellis	Big Finish Productions
2018	19 Weeks	Emily	BBC Radio 4

=== Stage ===
Year	Title	Role	Venue
2003	The Taming of the Shrew	Bianca	Royal Shakespeare Company
2003	Titus Andronicus	Lavinia	Royal Shakespeare Company
2004	The Stonewatcher	Marika / Vizike	National Theatre
2005	Henry IV, Part 1	Lady Mortimer	National Theatre
2005	Henry IV, Part 2	Doll Tearsheet	National Theatre
2012	All New People	Emma	Duke of York's Theatre

=== Audiobook narrator ===
Year	Title	Author	Notes
2007	Border Princes	Dan Abnett	Torchwood audiobooks
2009	In the Shadows	Joseph Lidster	Torchwood audiobooks

=== Video games ===
Year	Title	Role	Notes	Ref.
2011	Dragon Age II	Merrill	Voice only	
