= North Wales International Music Festival =

Welsh classical music festival

- Genre: Classical
- Years active: 1972-Present
- Founders: William Mathias
- Website: www.nwimf.com

The North Wales International Music Festival is a classical music festival held annually in St Asaph Cathedral in North Wales. It was founded by William Mathias in 1972 and takes place every September. William Mathias was artistic director of the Festival for twenty years until his death in 1992. He was followed by Geraint Lewis and Ann Atkinson, who was also in post for twenty years before stepping down in 2023. Paul Mealor was announced as the festival's new artistic director on 2 October 2023.
