= Geraint Todd =

Welsh actor and photographer

- Born: Geraint Wyn Todd; 8 August 1979 (age 47); Pontypridd, Wales
- Occupations: Actor, photographer, director
- Notable work: David Manning in Cowbois ac Injans; Ed Charles in Pobol y Cwm

Geraint Wyn Todd (born 8 August 1979) is a Welsh actor and director, originally from Pontypridd in the South Wales Valleys. He has played several major roles in Welsh dramas and comedies, most notably in Cowbois ac Injans (2006-2007), Gwaith/Cartref (2011-2012) and Pobol y Cwm (2011-2019).

== Career ==
Todd started his acting career when in school, with parts on television programmes such as Halen yn y Gwaed (Salt in the Blood), Pam Fi, Duw? (Why Me, God?) and a small part in Pobol y Cwm.

From 1997 to 2000 he attended the University of Wales in Cardiff, where he pursued a double major in History and English Literature. Although acting was always a passion, he said, he was aware of the difficulty that some actors have in finding work, so he determined to complete his degree as a backup plan. During his final year at university he played a role in "Y Palmant Aur". He worked steadily in acting thereafter and says that because of the enjoyment he got from it, after a year of earning his living as an actor he had decided that it was definitely what he wanted to do in life.

After graduation Todd worked on a variety of Cardiff drama series from 2000 to 2002, such as "A Mind to Kill", "Y Tŷ" (The House), "The Bench" and "Iechyd Da". He also voiced a number of radio advertisements and spent a month going round the schools of Wales with a theatre education tour, on behalf of the Welsh Books Council (Cyngor Llyfrau Cymru), in order to promote reading amongst young people. He also had the opportunity to present two series of a music and travel programme called "Bicini" which won the Young People's Award at the Celtic Film and Television Festival (Féile na Méan Ceilteach) in 2001.

In March 2002 he filmed "Xtra", a soap, in North Wales, returning briefly to Cardiff in early 2003 to do Triongl (Triangle), a three-part dramatic series, then went back north for a second series of Xtra before moving back to Cardiff in late 2003.

In 2004 he worked with a friend, Gareth Bryn Evans, on a short film, "Waking Sleep", with a Welsh version made at the start of 2005. The film was also screened at the Cardiff Film Festival. He also worked on a drama series called Amdani and voiced a Welsh version of the popular Japanese anime Beyblade, of which a second series was recorded in early 2005.

Todd then played the leading role as David Manning (Manny) in Cowbois ac Injans, a Welsh comedy-drama broadcast on S4C in October 2006 and March 2007. He also played the role of Merlin the Magician in the 2008 television show Herio'r Ddraig.

Todd joined the cast of Pobol y Cwm in 2011 as regular character Ed Charles, leaving in 2019. He has since directed episodes of the show, as well as the S4C show Itopia. Todd also portrayed teacher Steffan Young in drama Gwaith/Cartref, from the end of series 1 through series 2 (2011-2012).

Todd is also a professional photographer. He lives in Cardiff with his wife and their sons.
