= Caerdydd (TV series) =

Welsh language television series (2006–2010)

- Created by: Fiction Factory
- Country of origin: United Kingdom
- Original language: Welsh
- No. of seasons: 5

Production
- Producers: Fizzy Oppè, Catrin Rees, Ed Thomas
- Running time: 47 minutes (III)

Original release
- Network: S4C
- Release: 2006 – 2010

Caerdydd is a Welsh language television programme set in Cardiff made by Fiction Factory for Welsh public service television station S4C. The series is "a stylish, new drama about modern, urban Welsh-speakers living in a bilingual city" following "a group of modern urban twenty- and thirtysomethings" with "their complex friendships and relationships [set] against a backdrop of relentless socialising". First commissioned by S4C's drama editor Angharad Jones in 2005, as part of a drive by S4C to reach a younger audience, the third series of Caerdydd started its run on S4C on 30 March 2008. A fourth series was commissioned and went into production in Spring 2008. It started broadcasting on 14 June 2009.

== Awards and nominations ==
Caerdydd (2nd series) has received three nominations for the 2008 Bafta Cymru awards: Best Screenwriter for Ed Talfan, Best Design for Hayden Pearce and Best Director of Photography (Drama) for Richard Wyn. The second series was also nominated at the Celtic Media Festival 2008 for best drama series.

The third series has been nominated for Best Drama Series at the 2009 Bafta Cymru awards; Roger Wiliams as Best Screenwriter, and Ryland Teifi as Best Actor.

== Criticism ==
Criticism of the series focuses mainly on three topics:

- the series was originally set in Dublin and only transferred to Cardiff when commissioned by S4C.
- the large amount of English spoken, not just as some characters are non-Welsh speakers, but also English words in Welsh dialogue.
- explicit sex scenes of both a heterosexual and homosexual nature.

== "Sex and the Senedd" controversy ==
A row started after the broadcast of episode three in series III as it emerged that a sex scene was actually filmed on location in a toilet room of the Senedd, the Welsh National Assembly building, and not in a television studio. Officials of the National Assembly for Wales Commission who approved the filming for the Neuadd area, the corridors of the building and for one scene in the baby-changing room, were not made aware of the nature of the scene. The scene itself, filmed on 14 March 2008, involves Lea Kennedy (played by Alys Thomas) who is working for an unnamed party group and her much older boyfriend Stephen James (Dewi Rhys Williams) having sexual intercourse. As a result, S4C announced that it was investigating the matter and had contacted producers. One AM, William Graham (Conservative) called for scripts to be vetted more closely in the future.

S4C's investigation came to this conclusion: "S4C has looked into the circumstances surrounding the filming of drama series Caerdydd at the Senedd and is satisfied that the production company followed the correct procedures. We are confident that Senedd personnel who dealt with this issue were not misled."

The National Assembly's investigation came to this conclusion: "The National Assembly has carried out a full internal review of the circumstances of the filming of Caerdydd. We can confirm that at no stage of the negotiations about the use of the building for filming, or during the filming itself, was the content of the scene disclosed by the programme makers. Despite this setback, the Assembly is committed to being open and accessible to all, including programme makers, and we sincerely hope that this does not prevent us from working with responsible companies in future."

== Characters and cast ==
- Peter Marshall (Ryland Teifi)
- Emyr Tomos (Lee Haven-Jones)
- Osian James (Gareth Pierce)
- Lea Kennedy (Alys Thomas)
- Stephen James (Dewi Rhys Williams)
- Elen Aaron (Rhian Green)
- Mike Powell (Julian Lewis Jones)
- Kate Marshall Ford (Mali Harries)
- Robert Lewis (Bradley Freegard)
- Non Ellis Jones (Sue Roderick) III/2-8,10
- Natasha Jenkins (Ffion Williams) III/2-10, IV, V
- Jamie Roberts (Gareth Milton) IV-V (Dyfan Dwyfor) III/4-10
- Danny Ford (Huw Rhys) I, II
- Gareth Pritchard (Matthew Gravelle)
- Ceri Price (Siwan Morris) I, II, III/5-7,9,10
- Paul (Richard Shackley)
- Siân Edwards (Iola Hughes)
- Lleucu (Tara Bethan) II, III/1-3
- Damian Charles (Daniel Hope) I, II, III/1-3
- Mike Thomas (Jâms Thomas) III/2,3,6-9
- Yr Arglwydd (Lord) Delme Richards (Ian Saynor) III/2-4,7,9,10
- Ben (Jonathan Floyd) III/2-5
- Mared (Rhian Jones) III/3,4,6,7,9
- Rhys Johnstone (Rhodri Meilir) I, II
- Philip (Glyn Morgan) III/4,8,9
- Jane (Sharon Roberts) III/8,9
- Kylie Byrne (Jennie Crum) III/6,10
- Rhodri (Cellan Wyn Evans) III/9,10
- Sara Harris [Lauren Phillips] IV-V

Further cast: Catherine Ayers (Nia, I), Nathan Sussex, Sousila Pilay (II), Lillie Downie (Baby Ela Ford, III/4,6-10), Amelia Wyatt (Baby Ela Ford, III/3,4), Nick Ross (Gwilym, III/3), Lisa Zamira (III/3), Lee Bane (III/3), John Schumacher (III/3), Tomos James (III/3), Tyron Lopez (III/4), Gemma Prosser (III/4), Hazel Condon (III/4), Bethan Cecil (III/7), Charlote Grey (III/8), Poonah Najimohammadi (III/9), Rob Kendrick (actor) (III/9), Martin Glyn Murray (III/9), Elen Florence (I), Charmaine Hibberd (III/10), Kathryn Dimery (III/10), Megan Browne (Ela Ford), Ross O'Hennessy John Davies The Immigration Officer

== Production ==
- The series is produced for S4C by Fiction Factory, a division of Tinopolis.
- Directors: Ed Thomas (I, II, III/1-5), Dave "D.J." Evans (II, III/6-10), Ed Talfan (I, II)
- Writers: Tim Price, Ian Staples (var. II, III/2,9), Anwen Huws (III/3,7), Roger Williams (III/4,6,8,10), Catrin Clarke (III/5,6)
- Producers: Fizzy Oppè, Catrin Rees, Ed Thomas (III)
- Line producer: Maurice Hunter (III)
- Series 1 was filmed in the main from January to April 2005. Directors: Ed Thomas, Ed Talfan
- Series 2 was filmed in the main from February to July 2006. Directors: Ed Thomas, Ed Talfan, Dave Evans.
- Series 3 was filmed in the main from January to June 2007. Directors: Ed Thomas, Dave Evans
- Series 2 and 3 were produced in HD format.
- Series 4 has been commissioned and is currently in production.
- Episodes are available (with on-screen English subtitles) on S4C's website for streaming for 35 days after initial broadcast. The first series went online each Saturday following the initial TV broadcast, without any restrictions to availability.
- All episodes are fully subtitled, in Welsh and English. The Welsh subtitles are available for download.
- All episodes in series 3 feature audio description.

== Broadcasts ==
=== Series 1 ===
Broadcasts of Series 1 on S4C
Episode	First	Repeated	Viewers
1	11 January 2006	13 January 2006	
2	18 January 2006	20 January 2006	
3	25 January 2006	27 January 2006	
4	3 February 2006	5 February 2006	
5	10 February 2006	12 February 2006	
6	17 February 2006	19 February 2006	
7	24 February 2006	26 February 2006	

=== Series 2 ===
Broadcasts of Series 2 on S4C
Episode	First	Repeated	Viewers
1	10 January 2007	12 January 2007	70,000
2	17 January 2007	19 January 2007	45,000
3	24 January 2007	26 January 2007	40,000
4	31 January 2007	2 February 2007	<30,000
5	7 February 2007	9 February 2007	<33,000
6	14 February 2007	16 February 2007, 18 February 2007	43,000
7	21 February 2007	23 February 2007, 25 February 2007	<35,000
8	28 February 2007	2 March 2007, 4 March 2007	43,000
9	7 March 2007	9 March 2007, 11 March 2007	<40,000
10	14 March 2007	16 March 2007	<36,000

The second series was repeated in February and March 2008.

=== Series 3 ===
Broadcasts of Series 3 on S4C
Episode	First	Repeated	Viewers
1	30 March 2008	3 April 2008	44,000
2	6 April 2008	10 April 2008	61,000
3	13 April 2008	17 April 2008	45,000
4	20 April 2008	24 April 2008	46,000
5	27 April 2008	1 May 2008	46,000
6	4 May 2008	8 May 2008	40,000
7	11 May 2008	15 May 2008	43,000
8	18 May 2008	22 May 2008	49,000
9	25 May 2008	29 May 2008	59,000
10	1 June 2008	5 June 2008	49,000

=== Series 4 ===
Broadcasts of Series 4 on S4C
Episode	First	Repeated	Viewers
1	14 June 2009		<32,000
2	21 June 2009		32,000
3	28 June 2009		38,000
4	5 July 2009		<30,000
5	12 July 2009		<35,000
6	19 July 2009		<38,000
7	26 July 2009		<38,000
8	2 August 2009		38,000
9	9 August 2009		36,000
10	16 August 2009		<36,000

== See also ==
- List of Welsh television series
