= Cowbois ac Injans =

- Also known as: Cowboys and Engines
- Created by: Jon Tregenna & Catherine Tregenna
- Written by: Jon Tregenna and Catherine Tregenna
- Directed by: Gruff Jones, Gareth Bryn, Daf Palfrey, Eryl Hugh Phillips
- Starring: Geraint Todd, Janet Aethwy, Simon Fisher, Rhodri Evan, Catherine Ayres, Gareth Morris, John Rowley, Rhys Ap William, Sara Harris Davies, Huw Ceredig
- No. of episodes: 16

Production
- Producer: Eryl Hugh Phillips for Rondo
- Running time: 48 minutes

Original release
- Network: S4C
- Release: 2006 – March 2007

Cowbois ac Injans (Cowboys and Engines) is a Welsh language television drama written by brother and sister Jon Tregenna and Catherine Tregenna which was broadcast on S4C. The series was made by Teledu Opus, which later became Rondo Productions. The title was a pun on the phrase "Cowboys and "Injuns"; "injun", a mis-pronunciation of "Indian" (as in "American Indian") sounds similar to "injan", Welsh for "engine".

== Plot ==
The comedy drama is set in a used car showroom, Garej Wheelers, somewhere in the Wild West of Wales. Things don't always go according to plan. It's a world of love, lies and second-hand cars. The series also deals in the fading dreams of the staff, for as Billy Wheeler said, 'No ever grows up wanting to be a car salesman.' The series had a serial element but also featured a 'story of the week' with guest actors appearing to take the role of customers.

== Main characters ==
- Bili Wheeler: Simon Fisher - patriarchal figure and proprietor of Wheelers
- Balders: Rhodri Evan - hapless clown-like salesman who write romantic fiction in his spare time.
- Jo-Jo: Catherine Ayers - Billy's daughter - former carnival queen who has a crush on Manny.
- Manny: Geraint Todd - new salesman just back from London where he was in a band.
- Cez: Mared Swain - Jo-Jo's best friend and Manny's loving wife.
- Del: Janet Aethwy - 40-something and fiery - a woman whose husband left her for a younger model.
- Jimmy: Neil Williams - Del's ex - an underwear salesman.
- Carwyn: John Rowley - Balders' mute cousin.
- Arwyn: Rhys ap William - Balders' bullying cousin.
- Val: Sara Harris-Davies - Billy's wife.
- Russ: Gareth Morris - Cez's Dad - he's dying of cancer which is the reason Cez and Manny came home.
- Vince: Huw Ceredig - barfly at the local pub.

== Location ==
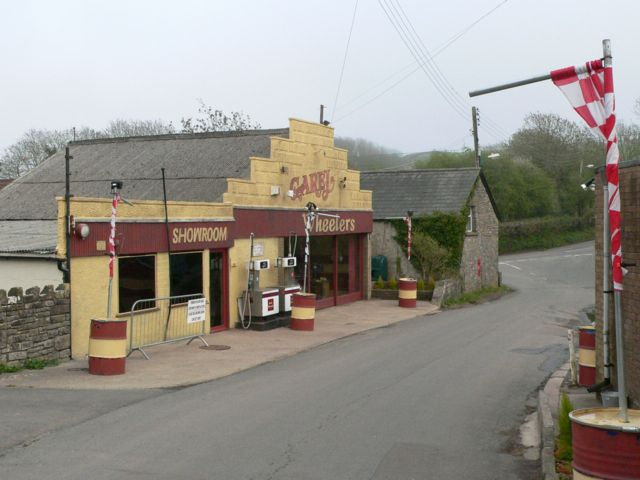
Garage at The Herberts

The main location - the showroom - was in The Herberts, a small village outside Cowbridge in the Vale Of Glamorgan. It was formerly a Rover dealership. The building has since been demolished. Other locations included Pontarddulais, Llanelli, Llantrisant and various other locations throughout the Vale.

== History ==
The series was commissioned by Angharad Jones for S4C. The first series of 8 episodes aired during Autumn 2006. The series returned for a second series which began transmission on 4 February 2007.

== Awards ==
In April 2007, Cowbois ac Injans was awarded the prize for Best Drama Series at the Celtic Media Festival in Scotland.

At the 2007 BAFTA Cymru Awards, Gareth Bryn Evans won the prize for Best Newcomer after directing episode six of Cowbois ac Injans Series 1.

At the 2008 BAFTA Cymru Awards, Rhodri Evan won Best Actor for his role as 'Balders'. The prize was presented by Ruth Jones from Gavin & Stacey.

== See also ==
- List of Welsh television series
