= James Hawes (author) =

British novelist (born 1960)

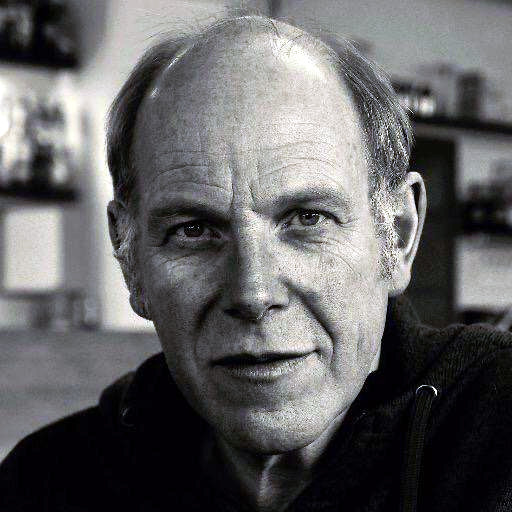
Hawes in 2019

James M. Hawes (born 1960) is a British novelist and popular historian who has been an official bestseller in both genres. He has written theatrically released screen adaptations of two of his works, and has appeared as an on-screen contributor in BBCTV's Art That Made Us (2022), on which he was also credited as Series Story Consultant, and Mozart: Rise of a Genius (2024).

== Early life and education ==
Hawes grew up in Gloucestershire, Edinburgh and Shropshire. As an undergraduate, he studied History and German at Hertford College, Oxford. In 1985–1986 he was in charge of CADW excavations at Blaenavon Ironworks, now a UNESCO World Heritage site. He went on to study for a Ph.D. on Nietzsche and German literature 1900–1914 at University College, London in 1987–89, before lecturing in German at Maynooth University, Sheffield University and Swansea University.

== Writing ==
Hawes has published six novels, two of which he has adapted as films, Rancid Aluminium starring Rhys Ifans and Dead Long Enough starring Michael Sheen. His first two novels, A White Merc with Fins (1996) and Rancid Aluminium (1997) were both Sunday Times bestsellers.

In 2005 Random House published his novel Speak for England, which predicted Brexit so accurately that in April 2017 the Observer declared "it deserves some kind of prescience prize" (Observer 23.4.2017). His Kafka biography, Excavating Kafka (2008), was adapted as a BBCTV documentary, Kafka Uncovered (2009). Englanders and Huns, a detailed history of Anglo-German relationships from 1864 to 1914, was shortlisted in the Paddy Power Political Books of the Year 2015.

His journalism and book-reviews have been widely and prominently published.

He has taught on the Oxford University MSt. in Creative Writing since 2008. Among his former students are Kit de Waal (My Name is Leon) Catherine Chanter (The Well) and Anne Youngson (Meet me at the Museum).

His book The Shortest History of Germany was published in May 2017. It reached #2 in the Sunday Times list of non-fiction paperback bestsellers (May 2018). The Shortest History of England (2020) reached #4 in the Times list of non-fiction paperback bestsellers.

In 2022 he published Brilliant Isles, a tie-in to the BBCTV series Art That Made Us.

His latest book is The Shortest History of Ireland, which was #1 in the Irish Times non-fiction hardbacks for 18 weeks in March–September 2026

== Bibliography ==
- A White Merc With Fins (1996)
- Rancid Aluminium (1997 – screenplay 2000)
- Dead Long Enough (2000 – screenplay 2005)
- White Powder, Green Light (2002)
- Speak for England (2005)
- My Little Armalite (2008)
- Excavating Kafka (2008 – published in the United States as Why You Should Read Kafka Before You Waste Your Life)
- Englanders and Huns: The Culture Clash which Led to the First World War (2014)
- The Shortest History of Germany (2017)
- The Shortest History of England (2020)
- The Shortest History of Ireland (2026)
