= Pen Talar =

2010 Welsh drama series on S4C

- Genre: Drama
- Created by: Sion Eirian; Ed Thomas
- Starring: Richard Harrington; Ryland Teifi; Mali Harries; Aneirin Hughes; Eiry Thomas; Dafydd Hywel
- Country of origin: Wales
- No. of series: 1
- No. of episodes: 9

Production
- Running time: c. 60 minutes

Original release
- Network: S4C
- Release: 12 September 2010 – present

Pen Talar is a drama series on S4C. The series tells the story of two families from west Wales over a period of half a century, starting in the 1950s and continuing until the present day. The main character, played by Richard Harrington, appears from the third episode onwards, as the previous episodes deal with the life of his character as a child. A substantial proportion of the film was filmed in Cil-y-Cwm, Carmarthenshire although filming also took place in Aberystwyth and Cardiff. The series was produced by Fiction Factory. The series was produced by Gethin Scourfield and directed by Gareth Bryn and Ed Thomas.

== Cast ==
- Defi Lewis - Richard Harrington
- Douglas Green - Ryland Teifi
- Enid Lewis - Eiry Thomas
- John Lewis - Aneirin Hughes
- Siân Lewis - Mali Harries
- Albert Green - Dafydd Hywel

== See also ==
- List of Welsh television series
