= Hinterland (TV series) =

British police procedural TV series (2013–2016)

- Welsh: Y Gwyll
- Literally: The Dusk
- Genre: Police procedural
- Created by: Ed Talfan; Ed Thomas
- Starring: Richard Harrington; Mali Harries; Alex Harries; Hannah Daniel; Aneirin Hughes
- Country of origin: United Kingdom (Wales)
- Original languages: Welsh; English
- No. of series: 3
- No. of episodes: 26

Production
- Executive producer: Ed Thomas
- Producers: Gethin Scourfield; Ed Talfan
- Running time: 90 minutes
- Production companies: Fiction Factory; Tinopolis

Original release
- Network: S4C (Welsh-language version); BBC One Wales (English-language version)
- Release: 29 October 2013 – 18 December 2016

Related
- Hidden

Hinterland, known as Y Gwyll (Welsh for 'The Dusk') in the original Welsh language version, is a Welsh language noir police procedural series broadcast on S4C in Welsh from 29 October 2013. The main character, DCI Tom Mathias, is played by Richard Harrington. On 27 November 2013, a second series was announced by S4C. The English-language version, with brief passages of Welsh dialogue, aired on BBC One Wales. When it was shown on the BBC in 2014, it was the first BBC television drama with dialogue in both English and Welsh. A third series of the show began filming in January 2016 and debuted on S4C on 30 October.

The programme is set in Aberystwyth, Ceredigion, Wales, and the three series were filmed in and around the town, often in rural locations. The critical reaction to Hinterland was favourable. Wales Arts Review wrote: "Y Gwyll has been shot with real intelligence; simple, subtle and with both eyes focused on the feeding of the atmospheric cloud over the piece." Hinterland was subsequently shown in 150 countries.

== Production ==
The series reflects the commitment made in April 2013 by the Director of BBC Cymru Wales, Rhodri Talfan Davies, to show more Welsh language, life, and culture on the mainstream BBC channels.

On a tight budget, funds that took two and a half years to raise, the total production cost was £4.2 million. The production received £215,000 in repayable business funding from the Welsh Government, and the first series was mainly filmed in Aberystwyth and the surrounding county of Ceredigion on the west coast of Wales, over a 124‑day period in 2013. The show was filmed in both Welsh and English, with the location-based production offices contained within the former Ceredigion Council offices Swyddfa'r Sir, which also acts as the exterior of the show's police station.

Each scene was filmed twice, in the English and Welsh languages, apart from a few scenes where Welsh with subtitles is used for the English version.

The Welsh version was broadcast (in eight parts) on S4C in October 2013, with the bilingual version (in four parts) broadcast on BBC One Wales in January 2014 and on BBC Four later that year. Danmarks Radio (DR), acquired the rights in 2012 to broadcast the show in Denmark, before filming had commenced.

== Cast ==
- Richard Harrington as Detective Chief Inspector Tom Mathias
- Mali Harries as Detective Inspector Mared Rhys
- Alex Harries as Detective Constable Lloyd Elis
- Hannah Daniel as Detective Sergeant Siân Owens
- Aneirin Hughes as Chief Superintendent Brian Prosser

=== Main cast ===
Actor	Character	Series			
Actor	Character	1	Special	2	3
Richard Harrington	Thomas Mathias	Main	Main	Main	Main
Mali Harries	Mared Rhys	Main	Main	Main	Main
Alex Harries	Lloyd Ellis	Main	Main	Main	Main
Hannah Daniel	Siân Owens	Main	Main	Main	Main
Aneirin Hughes	Brian Prosser	Main	Main	Main	Main
Anamaria Marinca	Meg Mathias		Guest	Main	
Geraint Morgan	Iwan Thomas	Recurring		Recurring	Recurring
Sian Reese-Williams	Manon				Recurring
Siôn Alun Davies	Owain				Recurring

== Episodes ==
=== Series overview ===
Series	Episodes	Originally aired	
Series	Episodes	First aired	Last aired
1	8	29 October 2013	21 November 2013
2	10	1 January 2015	1 November 2015
3	8	30 October 2016	18 December 2016

=== Series 1 (2013) ===
No. overall	No. in season	Title	Directed by	Written by	Original release date	UK viewers (millions)
1	1	"Devil's Bridge - Part 1"	Marc Evans	David Joss Buckley & Ed Thomas	29 October 2013	0.81
On his first day in his new job in Aberystwyth, DCI Tom Mathias is called out to investigate a suspicious disappearance. In a quiet seaside bungalow, he discovers a bathroom covered in blood but no sign of the resident owner, Helen Jenkins. Discovering that Jenkins was once the manager of a children's home, DCI Mathias and DI Mared Rhys venture up into the mountains, where DCI Mathias uncovers evidence which suggests Helen has been thrown from the parapet at Devil's Bridge into the water below.
2	2	"Devil's Bridge - Part 2"	Marc Evans	David Joss Buckley & Ed Thomas	31 October 2013	0.58
The subsequent investigation leads Mathias to investigate former residents of the home, who have since gone on to blow the whistle on the illegal activities which took place during Helen's tenure. As the case becomes increasingly complicated, Mathias discovers that a former resident who suffered a traumatic event at the home as a child may hold the key to an otherwise impenetrable case.
3	3	"Night Music - Part 1"	Gareth Bryn	Ed Talfan	5 November 2013	0.66
DCI Mathias investigates the brutal murder of 69-year-old Idris Williams, who was found bludgeoned to death in his farmhouse on the Aberystwyth mountains. Despite the lack of an apparent motive for the attack, the disappearance of camera equipment and one picture from the victim's dark room suggest that whilst photographing the local landscape, Williams pictured something that nobody wanted him to see.
4	4	"Night Music - Part 2"	Gareth Bryn	Ed Talfan	7 November 2013	0.57
As the investigation progresses, information regarding the deep and twisted family history of local farm ownership begins to offer up further suspects, and the disappearance of three prisoners from a POW camp back in 1943 provides a vital lead in uncovering the killer's identity. Before the killer is caught, however, a second victim is kidnapped from the nearby guild, and Mathias realises that time is running out to find the victim alive.
5	5	"Penwyllt - Part 1"	Rhys Powys	David Joss Buckley & Ed Thomas	12 November 2013	0.72
In the isolated hamlet of Penwyllt, the body of a young labourer, and former highly praised school teacher, Michael Reynolds, is found in the murky depths of a quarry lake. Initial forensics reveal that Reynolds did not drown where he was found, as water samples found in his lungs contain traces of sheep urine and faeces. As the investigation draws DCI Mathias into the heart of the close-knit community, he discovers that Reynolds was having an affair with the wife of the local pub landlord, and was taking the son of one of his co-workers deep into the forest to visit an hermetic villager, who some years previously had torched his own home and nearly killed his estranged wife and two children.
6	6	"Penwyllt - Part 2"	Rhys Powys	David Joss Buckley & Ed Thomas	14 November 2013	0.66
When the body of a second victim is found in a nearby garage, Mathias goes against the advice of Prosser — but his continued digging eventually uncovers the scene where Reynolds was killed and who was responsible.
7	7	"The Girl in the Water - Part 1"	Ed Thomas	Jeff Murphy	19 November 2013	0.64
The carefully posed body of a young woman in a red dress is found in Borth marshes. Initial suspicion points towards an ex-boyfriend, who was assaulted by the girl's father, Iwan Thomas, shortly before the girl died, and whose alibi is false. However, Mathias soon discovers the girl was also romantically involved with her university professor, who had tried to end their relationship on the night she died. As Mathias begins to grow close to the girl's grieving mother, he finds the investigation has missed one key suspect, Iwan Thomas. However, when he tries to look into the suspect's past, Prosser questions Mathias' actions.
8	8	"The Girl in the Water - Part 2"	Ed Thomas	Jeff Murphy	21 November 2013	0.49
After Mathias discovers a plot to murder a second victim, he becomes determined to catch the culprit and save the intended target — but the case pushes him to the edge, both personally and professionally.

=== Series 2 (2015) ===
No. overall	No. in season	Title	Directed by	Written by	Original release date	UK viewers (millions)
9	1	"In the Dead of Night - Part 1"	Ed Thomas	Jeff Murphy	1 January 2015	0.86
With blood on his hands, and his future hanging in the balance, DCI Mathias is forced to return to the front line after an arson attack on an isolated farmhouse leaves a mother and child fighting for their lives. Drawn into a community of failing farms and long-standing feuds, what is it about the case that draws Mathias in, pulling him back from the brink?
10	2	"In the Dead of Night - Part 2"	Ed Thomas	Jeff Murphy	1 January 2015	0.86
With Prosser casting eyes from all sides, Mathias is forced to juggle the current investigation while recovering the remains of his tattered reputation.
11	3	"Ceredigion - Part 1"	Gareth Bryn	Debbie Moon	13 September 2015	0.54
Mathias finds that his world has been turned upside down after his wife Meg turns up in Aberystwyth, and an investigation by the IPCC into his conduct is about to reach its conclusion. But when a bus driver is found shot dead on an isolated mountainside, the investigation provides a welcome escape.
12	4	"Ceredigion - Part 2"	Gareth Bryn	Debbie Moon	20 September 2015	0.55
The team have a suspect to question, but Mathias believes he is an unlikely killer. In his current state of mind, Mathias is fascinated by the lifestyle choices taken by ex-soldier John Bell. He also knows that he cannot avoid Meg for much longer.
13	5	"The Tale of Nant Gwrtheyrn - Part 1"	Julian Jones	Eoin McNamee	27 September 2015	0.45
The murder of a local dignitary and barrister leads to the uncovering of a tragic story of love and loss, fueled by distrust and suspicion in the depths of the hinterland. Why were Nora and Daniel living such a secluded life? What has Mathias discovered in the garden? Will he find Daniel before Glyn Powell gets hold of him?
14	6	"The Tale of Nant Gwrtheyrn - Part 2"	Julian Jones	Eoin McNamee	4 October 2015	0.42
The clock is ticking, but Mathias knows the relationship between Branwen Powell and Daniel is key to uncovering the truth.
15	7	"Dark River - Part 1"	Ed Thomas	Sue Everett	11 October 2015	0.37
The discovery of a body in a lake leads to an investigation about a local teacher from a small rural school. What is Gwilym's secret? Who is Ben Willis? Why did another ex-teacher commit suicide? Who is the mysterious girl, and why is she hiding from Mathias?
16	8	"Dark River - Part 2"	Ed Thomas	Sue Everett	18 October 2015	0.46
Is Greta still alive? This is a world rife with secrets. Will Mathias and the team unravel them in time, or is it already too late?
17	9	"The Sound of Souls - Part 1"	Ed Thomas	Ed Talfan	25 October 2015	0.31
A burnt body on the dunes embroils the team in a long standing family feud associated with the murder of a young mother, 13 years earlier. Mathias is convinced the young woman's murder holds the answers, but Prosser is not keen on Mathias' delving into the past.
18	10	"The Sound of Souls - Part 2"	Ed Thomas	Ed Talfan	1 November 2015	0.39
Will Mathias discover the truth of the matter, or will the person who's stalking him get in his way?

=== Series 3 (2016) ===
No. overall	No. in season	Title	Directed by	Written by	Original release date	UK viewers (millions)
19	1	"Aftermath - Part 1"	Gareth Bryn	Debbie Moon	30 October 2016	0.71
The murder of local minister Elwyn Jones leads a recovering DCI Mathias and his team deep into the secrets of a small farming village in rural Aberystwyth. Meanwhile, DS Owens leads the investigation into the attack on Mathias, and suspects that Iwan Thomas is more than likely responsible. Prosser, however, is determined to protect Mathias - and himself - as the truth begins to boil the surface.
20	2	"Aftermath - Part 2"	Gareth Bryn	Debbie Moon	6 November 2016	0.66
As the identity of Elwyn Jones' murderer becomes clear, Rhys and Mathias are forced to confront the possibility that the truth may tear his family apart. Mathias goes in search of Iwan Thomas, at the same time that Thomas meets with Prosser.
21	3	"A Poacher's Discovery - Part 1"	Ed Thomas	Cynan Jones	13 November 2016	0.69
Following the disappearance of Iwan Thomas, Prosser decides to distance himself from the case by pointing the finger of suspicion at Mathias. Meanwhile, the murder of a curator who is found buried in woodland leads Mathias and the team into the seedy history of a local artist, Lewis John, until he provides a solid alibi for the night of the murder. As DS Owens continues to investigate the attack on Mathias, she follows up on a reported sighting of Iwan Thomas' car, and finds his lifeless body at Devil's Bridge.
22	4	"A Poacher's Discovery - Part 2"	Ed Thomas	Cynan Jones	20 November 2016	0.79
Prosser brings in an independent investigator, Superintendent John Powell, to investigate Iwan Thomas' death, but is surprised to discover that he has history with Mared. Owens is drafted onto the investigation team, and immediately points the finger of suspicion at Mathias. As Iwan's cousin Gareth discloses to the police that Mathias was looking for Iwan on the night he died, Mathias remains undeterred, and uncovers vital evidence that suggests that Laura Dean's murderer was none other than her boyfriend, Ifan.
23	5	"Both Barrels - Part 1"	Gareth Bryn	Jeff Murphy	27 November 2016	0.54
A shooting at a rural petrol station leads Mathias and the team in search of a man who later resorts to kidnapping his own son. As Powell edges ever closer to uncovering the truth surrounding Iwan Thomas' death, Iwan's cousin provides him with a secret file containing evidence which suggests Prosser's involvement in the child abuse scandal. As Mathias goes out alone as part of a house-to-house enquiry, he unexpectedly comes face to face with the armed suspect at an isolated farmhouse.
24	6	"Both Barrels - Part 2"	Gareth Bryn	Jeff Murphy	4 December 2016	0.53
Held captive in the isolated farmhouse, Mathias tries to bargain with Llew in an attempt to secure his freedom. As word of Mathias' unexplained disappearance begins to spread, Mared begins to realise that he could be in serious danger and organises a search. Powell confronts former Chief Superintendent Robert Owen with the secret file Iwan Thomas had collected, only to have Owen warn him not to investigate too deeply into Thomas' past. As armed police close in, Mathias tries to prevent any further casualties by persuading Llew to hand himself in.
25	7	"Return to Pontarfynach - Part 1"	Ed Thomas	Mark Andrew	11 December 2016	0.81
The suicide of convicted murderer Caitrin John gives Mathias a surprising new lead into the suspicious death of Iwan Thomas. With Powell having closed the case following pressure from on high, Mathias seeks Mared's help to run a private investigation. The disappearance of a local GP in 1994, who was connected with the home, proves to be the leverage needed to crack the whole case wide open, much to the dismay of Prosser, who tries to suspend Mathias before the investigation can gather any weight.
26	8	"Return to Pontarfynach - Part 2"	Ed Thomas	Mark Andrew	18 December 2016	0.40
Prosser, on a knife edge, confronts Robert Owen and demands he confess the truth about what happened to Hugh Vaughan on the night of his disappearance, but as tensions reach boiling point, Prosser is unable to restrain himself and takes his second victim. Sian discovers that Prosser was the last person to have contact with Iwan Thomas before his death. As Mathias is forced to arrest his once-respected superior, the entire net of abusers begins to crumble, finally bringing the case to a close.

== Home video ==
=== United States ===
Acorn Home Video released Series 1 on 1 July 2014, but no further series releases until Acorn-TV released the Complete Series on 16 November 2021.

=== United Kingdom ===
Arrow Films released Series 1 on 26 May 2014; Series 2 on 30 May 2016; Series 3 and the Trilogy Complete Series on 29 May 2017.

=== Netherlands ===
Just Bridge Entertainment released Series 1 on 21 October 2014; Series 2 on 24 January 2017; Series 1–3 in 2018.

=== Germany ===
Polyband/WVG released Series 1 on 9 August 2015, Series 2 on 5 September 2016. Series 3 was never released, nor the complete series.

=== Australia ===
Acorn Home Video released Series 1 in 2014; Series 2 on 6 July 2016; Series 3 and the Trilogy Complete Series on 7 June 2017.

== See also ==
- List of Welsh television series
- List of British television series
