= BAFTA Cymru =

Welsh branch of the British Academy of Film and Television Arts

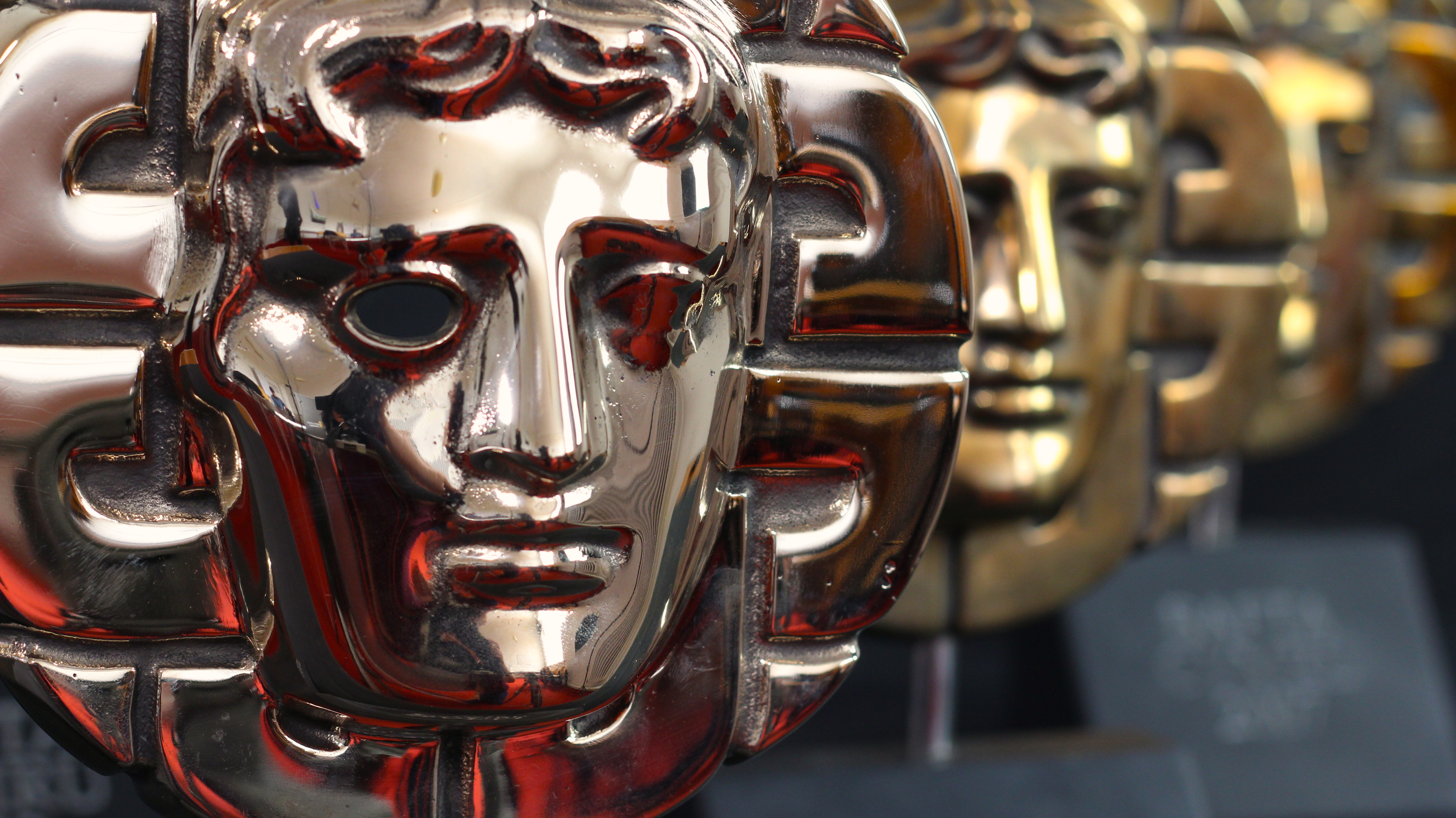
- Formation: 1987
- Type: Film, television and game educational charity
- Purpose: "supports develops and promotes the art forms of the moving image, by identifying and rewarding excellence, inspiring practitioners and benefiting the public."
- Headquarters: Chapter Arts Centre
- Location: Market Road, Canton, Cardiff CF5 1QE
- Region served: Wales
- Official language: Welsh
- Parent organization: British Academy of Film and Television Arts (BAFTA)
- Website: www.bafta.org/awards/cymru-awards

BAFTA Cymru (or BAFTA in Wales) is the Welsh branch of the British Academy of Film and Television Arts (BAFTA) and was founded in 1987.

The British Academy Cymru Awards were established in 1991, with the inaugural awards ceremony held on 30 November 1991. The annual ceremony takes place in Cardiff to recognise achievement in production, performance and craft categories in Welsh-made films and television programmes and by those of Welsh birth or residence. These are separate from the UK-wide British Academy Television Awards and British Academy Film Awards, although films and programmes recognised by BAFTA Cymru may also feature at BAFTA's national awards.

== Categories ==
- Television Drama
- Factual Series
- Entertainment Programme
- News and Current Affairs
- Children's Programme
- Single Documentary
- Short Film
- Game
- Presenter
- Director: Fiction
- Writer
- Editing
- Actor
- Actress
- Photography Factual
- Photography and Lighting
- Sound
- Original Music
- Costume Design
- Siân Phillips Award
- Outstanding Contribution to Television
