= Hivju =

Hivju is a Norwegian surname. Notable people with the surname include:

- Erik Hivju (born 1947), Norwegian actor
- Gry Molvær Hivju (born 1970), Norwegian journalist, director, producer, and screenwriter
- Kristofer Hivju (born 1978), Norwegian actor
