= Nanna Blondell =

Swedish actress (born 1986)

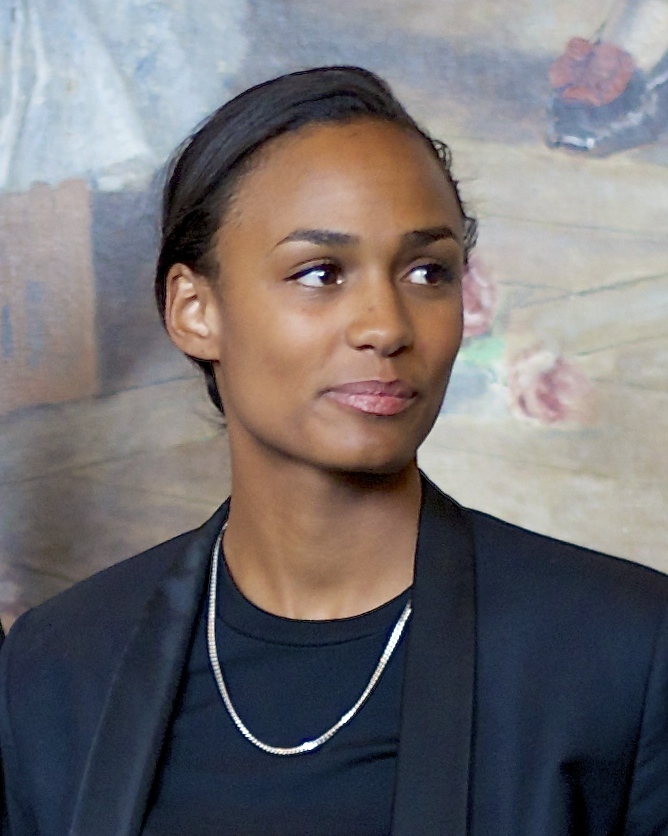
- Born: 1986 (age 39–40); Stockholm, Sweden
- Occupation: Actress
- Years active: 2005–present
- Children: 1

Nanna Terese Blondell (born 1986) is a Swedish actress.

== Education ==
Blondell earned a degree from Stockholm Academy of Dramatic Arts. As a child she wanted to be an actress, but she didn't believe that there was a future for her in Sweden's entertainment industry as a black woman.

== Career ==
Blondell made her on screen debut in the SVT drama series Livet enligt Rosa in 2005. After working for a while as a VJ with MTV Sweden she landed a role in an episode of police procedural Beck the following year, and a recurring role in soap opera Andra avenyn.

She raised her profile when she joined the cast of popular sci-fi drama Real Humans, a TV series that was exported around the world including the United Kingdom and France. She made her English language debut with Ø, an English-Language French TV series filmed in Denmark.

In 2018, she landed one of the roles in French feature film Soeurs d'armes (Sisters in Arms), inspired by a real military unit with female Kurdish, Yezidi and resistance fighters taking on ISIS, and was the only actress who did not speak any French. She portrayed an African-American sniper.

She can also be seen in Immortal as Sha Dishi - the leader of nation of immortals. This was also an English language French production, and could be seen via the French streaming app Blackpills.

Blondell had the female co-lead in gritty crime drama Hassel alongside actor Ola Rapace, and Twin starring Kristofer Hivju.

Nanna Blondell in 2026

In 2019, she announced on social media that she had a secret role in Marvel's Black Widow.

Her latest project is Red Dot, the first Netflix feature film from Sweden, co-starring Anastasios Soulis.

Since 2013, Blondell has been working at the Royal Dramatic Theatre.

Blondell debuted as the adult Laena Velaryon in episode six of the first season of HBO's House of the Dragon, the prequel show to the highly popular Game of Thrones.

== Other ==
She runs the podcast Fenomenala kvinnor (Phenomenal Women), where she interviews successful Swedish non-white women.

In 2016, she made her directorial debut with the short film Noni & Elizabeth. This film was in official selection at LA Film Festival, Palm Springs ShortFest and Giffoni Film Festival.

She has one daughter.

== Filmography ==
=== Film ===
Year	Title	Role	Notes
2013	Sommarstället	Aisa	
2013	Stockholm Stories	Minou, Jessica's assistant	
2019	Sisters in Arms	American sniper	
2021	Red Dot	Nadja	
2021	Black Widow	Ingrid	
2021	Attack on Finland	Sylvia Madsen	

=== Television ===
Year	Title	Role	Notes
2005	Livet enligt Rosa	Blenda	9 episodes
2006	MTV Nordic	Self	
2007	Beck	Muriel Santander	Episode: "Det tysta skriket"
2007–2008	Andra Avenyn	Olga Svensson	40 episodes
2011	Irene Huss	Maria	Episode: "I skydd av skuggorna"
2013–2014	Real Humans	Yuma	9 episodes
2014	Viva Hate	Susanne	2 episodes
2016	Ø	Sarah / Maggie (2016)	5 episodes
2017	Finaste familjen	Miranda	Episode dated 28 April 2017
2017	Hassel	Eira Lindhe	10 episodes
2019	The Inner Circle	Lena Nilsdotter	8 episodes
2019	Twin	Mary	8 episodes
2019–2020	Ture Sventon & Bermudatriangelns hemlighet	Petra	6 episodes
2022–2024	House of the Dragon	Laena Velaryon	3 episodes
2024	Concordia	Isabelle Larsson	
