= Crash (2009 TV series) =

British medical drama series

- Created by: Tony Jordan
- Starring: Elin Phillips; Gareth Milton; Kezia Burrows; Simon Rivers; Mark Lewis Jones; Nia Roberts; Ian Virgo; Kezrena James
- Country of origin: United Kingdom
- No. of episodes: 12

Production
- Executive producers: Tony Jordan; Claire Phillips; Rob Gittins
- Production locations: Caerphilly, Wales
- Running time: 30 minutes

Original release
- Network: BBC One Wales, BBC HD
- Release: 9 September 2009 – 28 May 2010

Crash is an British television drama series created by Tony Jordan and produced by Red Planet Pictures for BBC Wales. The series follows the lives of four newly qualified doctors.

The series is filmed in Cardiff. The series first aired at 20:30 BST on BBC One Wales and BBC HD on Wednesday 9 September 2009.

== Plot ==
The plot of the show follows the lives of junior doctors Cath, Rob, Rhian and Ameer as they start work at the fictional Cardiff City Hospital. The show will focus on the main characters personal relationships rather than on medical issues, as creator Tony Jordan states: "...it's not a medical show, it's just set in a hospital."

== Cast ==
- Elin Phillips as Rhian Matthews – Wanting to be a Doctor since she was a little girl, Rhian is compassionate to her patients but a bit too overconfident, which leads her to not notice that a patient she is diagnosing has already died.
- Gareth Milton as Simon Strettle – Another Junior Doctor at the hospital, Simon wants to be a Pathologist. He also has romantic feelings for Rhian, which doesn't go by unnoticed by Ameer.
- Kezia Burrows as Cath Llewelyn – A Junior Doctor who likes to party, Cath wakes up for her first day at work in bed with Rob.
- Simon Rivers as Ameer Mowad – The most intelligent of the Junior Doctors. Ameer always got top marks while at university and wants to be a Surgeon. Initially confident he crumbles under the pressure of his first day on call on the Crash team.
- Alexander Vlahos as Dylan*
- Mark Lewis Jones as Mike Hill – A&E Consultant at the hospital.
- Nia Roberts as Mary Finch – The Hospital Registrar and wife of Mike Hill.
- Ian Virgo as Alun Gethin – The Senior House Officer to the Junior Doctors.
- Kezrena James as Penny – A Nurse at the Hospital who takes a shine to Rob.
- Gareth Jewell as Rob Williams – (Series 1, Episode 1) Confident in his work Rob seeks to help his patients and his friends to the best of his ability. However, when dealing with a mentally ill patient (david lee smith) he is fatally stabbed.

== Production ==
Crash was commissioned by Clare Hudson and Piers Wenger of BBC Wales for a 12-episode run to be produced by Tony Jordan's independent production company Red Planet Pictures. The show was filmed at the former site for St. Ilan's High School in Caerphilly, which closed down and became abandoned in 2008, which was re-dressed to become the wards and corridors of the fictional Cardiff Metropolitan Hospital. Cardiff University's bioscience and psychology buildings were used for many of the hospital's exterior shots. The Cardiff University optometry building is also used for some of the interior shots. The series was filmed in HD and shot on Panasonic P2 cameras. 85% of the cast and crew were made up of local people.

== Writing ==
The episodes of Crash are each written by one writer, with the whole production overseen by Tony Jordan. Jordan himself wrote the first episode of the show, while subsequent episodes have been written by a range of new and established writers including playwright Kit Lambert, actor Richard Harrington and winner of the first Red Planet Prize, Joanna Leigh. Unlike other shows that use this writing model, Jordan doesn't rewrite or add to any of the other writers scripts. Instead each writer has to go through several drafts of rewriting their own scripts before they are filmed.

== Episodes ==
No.	Title	Directed by	Written by	Original release date
1 (1-01)	"Episode 1"	Ashley Way	Tony Jordan	9 September 2009
The Junior Doctors arrive at Cardiff City Hospital for their first day on the wards. Tragedy strikes when one of them is fatally stabbed by a patient.
2 (1-02)	"Episode 2"	Ashley Way	Rob Gittins	16 September 2009
The three remaining Junior Doctors try to come to terms with the death of their friend while continuing to work.
3 (1-03)	"Episode 3"	Ashley Way	Richard Harrington	23 September 2009
Cath and Ameer begin interviewing for a new flatmate, while Rhian befriends Simon and may have the solution to their flatmate problem.
4 (1-04)	"Episode 4"	Gareth Bryn	Kit Lambert	30 September 2009
Ameer finds the medical life difficult as he struggles to inform a patient about some bad news.
5 (1-05)	"Episode 5"	Gareth Bryn	Tracy Spottiswoode	7 October 2009
The doctors love lives take centre stage and Simon tries to muster up the courage to ask one of the girls out.
6 (1-06)	"Episode 6"	Gareth Bryn	Simon Harris	14 October 2009
Cath is suspended from work, but finds herself back on the wards when a family member is brought to the hospital.
7 (1-06)	"Episode 7"	D J Evans	Quirine Robbins	10 May 2010
Cath, Ameer, Simon and Rhian try to outdo each other to earn a new consultant's respect.
9 (1-09)	"Episode 9"	D J Evans	Neil Williams	17 May 2010
It should be a quiet Sunday night shift, but the gang have their work cut out.
11 (1-02)	"Episode 11"	Daf Palfrey	Richard Harrington	24 May 2010
Ameer has to face his nerves and choose should he follow a patient's religion, or concentrate on saving someone's life.
12 (1-12)	"Episode 12"	Daf Palfrey	Neil Williams	28 May 2010
Cath's birthday takes a tragic turn when 12-year-old Gabby dies in her arms.

== Reception ==
Reviews for the show's first episode have been mixed. Gavin Allen at Media Wales said that the show was of "...much better quality than you might expect for regional programming.". Caroline Hitt at the Western Mail felt the show looked good but bemoaned the death of Rob after just one episode. DeeDee Ramona at Mental Health Nursing site Mental Nurse however thought that the storyline of Rob and his patient was sensationlised, while TV reviewer and blogger Dan Owen awarded the show one and a half out of five stars and summed up the show as being like "...Scrubs with the jokes taken out, only not as hard-hitting."

Viewing figures for the show however have been quite positive. The first episode peaked with 170,000 viewers and an 18% audience share with a further 85,000 watching the Tuesday night repeat. BBC Wales head of programmes Clare Hudson said she was “...delighted with how well Crash has been received by the audience."

== See also ==
- List of Welsh television series
