= Sarah Dollard =

Australian television scriptwriter (born 1980)

- Born: 21 January 1980 (age 46)
- Occupations: Screenwriter, script editor
- Years active: 2004–present
- Known for: Doctor Who, Neighbours, Cara Fi, Bridgerton

Sarah Dollard (born 21 January 1980) is an Australian television screenwriter, living and working in the United Kingdom. She made her start in writing for television on the long-running Australian soap opera Neighbours, before moving to the UK in 2008. She created and wrote the Welsh romantic comedy series Cara Fi (Love Me), which debuted on S4C in 2014. She is Emmy nominated for her work as a Producer on Bridgerton.

== Career ==
=== Neighbours ===
Dollard worked on Neighbours for four years, as a storyliner, a script editor, a story editor, and a writer of over thirty episodes. Before leaving Australia, she also worked in script development for popular children's television series The Saddle Club, and in development on other children's shows with the Australian Children's Television Foundation.

=== Move to the UK ===
After moving to the UK, Dollard began working in the script departments of British fantasy and science fiction TV shows. She worked on season two of BBC One fantasy-adventure series Merlin, before moving on to Primeval in 2010, where she script-edited seasons four and five of the sci-fi series and wrote all five episodes of the Primeval web-series that introduced season four.

Dollard wrote the fifth episode of the fifth season of Toby Whithouse's popular BBC Three series Being Human, featuring guest star Kathryn Prescott, of Skins fame. Digital Spy called the episode, titled No Care, All Responsibility, "the latest in a string of knockout episodes – sweet and chilling in equal measure". Dollard also penned the webisodes that accompanied Being Human season five, focusing on the character of Alex Millar, played by Kate Bracken.

She wrote episode three of BBC spy thriller The Game, and co-wrote episode five with series creator Toby Whithouse.

=== Cara Fi and beyond ===
Dollard created and wrote her own rom-com series Cara Fi (Love Me) with Touchpaper Television, for the Welsh broadcaster S4C. The eight episode series focuses on a sleepy seaside village in Wales that runs out of women, so the locals advertise their single men on the side of milk cartons leaving the dairy. Each episode focuses on a new woman arriving in the village to be set up with a local man. The show debuted in November 2014 on S4C, and was subsequently on the BBC iPlayer.

In 2015, she wrote the tenth episode of the ninth series of Doctor Who, titled "Face the Raven". She also wrote an episode of the UK-US co-produced comedy-drama You, Me and the Apocalypse, and ITV period drama The Halcyon. She returned to write the episode "Thin Ice" for Series 10 of Doctor Who.

In 2018, she wrote the seventh episode for A Discovery of Witches, a television series based on the novel trilogy of the same name by Deborah Harkness. In October 2018 it was announced that the show would be renewed for a 2nd and 3rd season with Dollard as one of the main script writers.

Dollard was a writer and producer on the first season of Netflix's historical romance series Bridgerton. The season was nominated for an Emmy for Outstanding Drama Series, and Dollard is listed as a nominated producer.

In December 2016 it was announced that Dollard would adapt YA novel Cuckoo Song, by Frances Hardinge, for television. In December 2020 it was announced that Netflix had greenlit the series. In July 2022, it was announced the project has been cancelled.

In August 2023, it was announced that Dollard would adapt the mystery thriller Generation Loss by Elizabeth Hand, for television.

In March 2024, it was announced that Dollard would write and executive produce the noir series The Undertow, based on the Norwegian series Twin, for Netflix. In October 2026, it was announced that the series' name was changed to The Twin, which would premiere on 1 January 2027.

In June 2025, Screen Australia announced that Dollard’s How to Kill a Client, a dark comedy mystery thriller series, had received development funding through the Dynamic Television Scripted Initiative. Based on the book of the same name by Joanna Jenkins, How to Kill a Client will be produced by Easy Tiger Productions, with Catherine Millar attached as director.
