= Remember Me (video game) =

2013 video game

- Box art featuring protagonist Nilin
- Developer: Dontnod Entertainment (Note: Ported to Windows by QLOC)
- Publisher: Capcom
- Director: Jean-Maxime Moris
- Producer: Nicolas Simon
- Designers: Philippe Moreau; Marc Pestka
- Programmer: Jérome Banal
- Artists: Aleksi Briclot; Michel Koch
- Writers: Alain Damasio; Stéphane Beauverger
- Composer: Olivier Deriviere
- Engine: Unreal Engine 3
- Platforms: PlayStation 3; Windows; Xbox 360
- Release: NA: 3 June 2013; AU: 6 June 2013; EU: 7 June 2013
- Genre: Action-adventure
- Mode: Single-player

Remember Me is a 2013 action-adventure game developed by Dontnod Entertainment and published by Capcom. The game's plot focuses on Nilin, a memory hunter working for an underground resistance called the Errorists. When the game starts, she has been stripped of nearly all her memories by megacorporation Memorize. With the help of a mysterious man named Edge, she goes on a quest to bring down Memorize and recover her lost memories. Throughout the story, she is permitted to use her Memory Remix power to ultimately refurbish people's recollections. The combat consists of a modified combo system called Pressen.

Remember Me was developed as the debut project of Dontnod Entertainment, with one of the company's founding members Jean-Maxime Moris as its director. Part of his goal for the game was to create a thought-provoking narrative, and eventually settled on a female protagonist to help convey the story's themes. Originally a PlayStation 3 exclusive under Sony Computer Entertainment titled Adrift, it was cancelled in 2011 and later purchased by Capcom which resurrected it as a multi-platform game.

Remember Me was released for the PlayStation 3, Windows, and Xbox 360 in June 2013. The game received mixed reviews from critics upon release; praise was given to its world design, Olivier Deriviere's soundtrack, the ambition of the story and the Memory Remix segments, while the main criticisms laid against other aspects of the story, poor design choices and formulaic combat. It sold over 1 million units by 2016.

== Gameplay ==
Nilin engages in combat, using the Spammer against her enemies.

Remember Me features platforming, exploration and melee combat. The game is played as Nilin from a third-person view and introduces the mechanic of memory remixing: entering and rearranging a target's memories to manipulate them. Players accomplish this by replaying a memory and modifying details to change the target's recollection of the outcome. Another key mechanic of the gameplay is stealing memories from certain targets and using points called Remembranes to replay the memory in real-time: this is often needed to proceed through the game or avoid hazards otherwise hidden from the player. When the player is low on health, the screen will glitch until a sufficient amount of health is regained. On occasion, Nilin encounters puzzles in the form of riddles she must solve to unlock doors so as to further progress in the story.

In terms of combat, the game allows players to create and customise their own move combos in the Combo Lab, which uses four categories of fighting moves called Pressens. This is done by chaining them together, made possible through earning PMP (Procedural Mastering Power), with a limit of four combos being active at any one time. The Pressen moves are Regen (healing), Power (damage), Chain (duplication and doubling of previous moves) and Cooldown (regeneration of S-Pressen energy). There are 50,000 possible Pressen combinations. Five S-Pressen moves will be made available to the player over the course of the game: the moves enable them to do things like stun groups of enemies, move at high speed and land more hits, or turn hostile robots into allies which then self-destruct. Players also have access to projectile-based weapons like the Spammer and Junk Bolt.

== Synopsis ==
=== Setting ===
Remember Me is set in the year 2084, in a futuristic version of Paris called Neo-Paris, where the Memorize corporation has invented a new brain implant called Sensen, which enables 99% of the population to upload and share their memories with other people, as well as remove unhappy or unpleasant memories. This establishes Memorize as a surveillance state, which leads a small group of rebels by the name of Errorists to attempt to bring down the corporation. The invention of the Sensen has also resulted in the creation of Leapers, memory-addicted humans who have absorbed so many memories that their Sensen has degraded and they have mutated into subhuman form, now living in the sewers of Neo-Paris.

=== Plot ===
The game begins as Nilin (Kezia Burrows), an Errorist imprisoned in the Bastille Fortress, is having almost all her memory wiped by Memorize. As she is taken to have the last of her memories wiped, a mysterious man called Edge, the leader of the Errorists and a man she only hears over her comm device, helps her escape. Edge tells her that she is an Errorist with the gift of both stealing and remixing memories. After escaping into the slums of Neo-Paris, Nilin encounters Tommy, a fellow Errorist. Nilin and Tommy are attacked by Olga Sedova, a bounty hunter chasing Nilin. Nilin dives into Olga's mind and remixes her memory to make Olga believe that her husband was killed by a Memorize doctor. She then becomes an Errorist ally, and transports Nilin to her first destination. Arriving in the Saint-Michel district, Nilin, who is aided by another Errorist codenamed Bad Request, is told by Edge to steal secret codes from Kaori Sheridan, Neo-Paris' top architect. After retrieving and uploading the codes to Edge, he uses them to open the Saint-Michel dam, flooding the district. Due to the flood draining out the slums, Nilin is able to infiltrate the Bastille and heads to the memory servers to free the stored memories of herself and the inmates while taking down Madame, the sadistic manager of the Bastille. With Madame defeated, Nilin releases the memories of the inmates and partially regains some of her own. She remembers the crime that landed her in the Bastille; on a mission, Nilin remixed the mind of a Memorize commander and made him believe he had killed his girlfriend. The altered memory pushed him to commit suicide.

Nilin reluctantly goes along with Edge's next plan: to remix the CEO of Memorize, Scylla Cartier-Wells, to make her see the harm her company's technology is causing. Nilin makes her way into Scylla's office and enters her mind, remixing the memory of a car crash which left her with a bitter taste against the world. As she changes the memory to make Scylla a more compassionate person, Nilin discovers that she is Scylla's daughter. Nilin is then told by Edge to head for the Bastille basements to save Bad Request, who has been taken captive. She finds Bad Request, but discovers that his memory has been fully wiped. It is revealed that Memorize scientist Doctor Quaid means to control the Leapers through their Sensens and thus breed a private army for Memorize. However, Johnny Greenteeth, a former co-worker of Quaid's who was experimented on and turned into a Leaper, kills Quaid and prepares to self-destruct the Bastille. Bad Request helps Nilin take down Johnny at the cost of his life and Nilin escapes the destroyed facility.

With all of Memorize's secret operations taken down, Edge presses Nilin to find the Conception Cube, Memorize's central base, and destroy H3O, the Memorize Central Server. Once there, she encounters her father, Charles Cartier-Wells, the creator of the Sensens. Upon finding him, she sees that, fuelled by the car accident that injured his wife, he has become lost in a dream of an ideal world free from painful memories, all inspired by the desire to help Nilin forget about the accident. Nilin makes him see the harm his technology causes, and Scylla arrives to convince Charles to help Nilin enter the Central Server. Once in the presence of the Central Server, it is revealed to Nilin that Edge is a self-aware entity created by the amalgamation of unwanted memories within H3O. Nilin, who unwittingly started Edge with the memories of her unhappy childhood, enters the Server and, at H3O/Edge's will, she destroys him and releases the memories back into the general population. As the memories are released, Nilin remembers Edge's words about the mind being a fortress, and says that Edge died to remind people that memories should not become open to all, and that painful memories should be lived with rather than forcibly removed. She comes to the conclusion that outside her now-restored mind she has a family again and a damaged world to heal.

== Development and release ==
Development of Remember Me began in 2008 when Dontnod Entertainment was formed. Initially called Adrift, the original concept of the game was a world flooded from global warming, with a key gameplay mechanic being the player character using jetskis to navigate a coastal city. Later, the team became interested in the concept of memory as a central theme and redesigned the game accordingly, although game director Jean-Maxime Moris was reluctant to set the game in Paris since the studio was based there. It was originally developed as a role-playing game with Sony Computer Entertainment publishing it exclusively for the PlayStation 3, starting full development in February 2010. Following creative disagreements between Dontnod and Sony, and the subsequent cancellation of the project in February 2011 because of budget cuts, the project was presented at the 2011 Gamescom trade fair in the hope that it would garner the attention necessary to secure another publishing deal. Dontnod partnered with Capcom Europe, as Capcom purchased the intellectual property in 2012 and provided funding for the project, reimagining it as an action-adventure game for release on multiple platforms.

The game's theme was inspired by the social network sites that abound in the modern world, with Facebook, Tumblr and Twitter cited as examples. Moris explained that while some elements looked fantastical, the game was grounded in the real world in terms of how social networking might evolve over the coming decades. Remember Me was considered to be the digital view of human identity compared to Dontnod's Life Is Strange, its analogue counterpart. The game was influenced by classic cyberpunk anime such as Akira and Ghost in the Shell, and one of the literary works referenced in the game is George Orwell's novel Nineteen Eighty-Four. When asked in an interview why he made the protagonist a woman, Moris replied that he wanted a game in the cyberpunk genre that was more about "emotion, intimacy, identity, and the way technology would intersect those", so it made more sense for the player character to be a woman. However, when the game was shown to potential publishers, many were discouraged from backing the project, saying that a male character would be more successful.

The music was composed by Olivier Deriviere, who recorded the score with a 70-piece orchestra, then modified and changed it using electronic equipment. In an interview with Game Informer, Deriviere said: "During my first contact [with the game], I was quite confused by so much information and I felt the music should reflect this confusion". Deriviere disclosed that players would not hear the main theme until the end of the game, given that it is scattered in pieces through the rest of the score to reflect the nature of the game and the story of Nilin. For his work, Deriviere was awarded the 2013 IFMCA award for Best Original Score for a Video Game or Interactive Media. Remember Me was created with Unreal Engine 3 to lessen the workload involved in making a new intellectual property with a nascent studio of just under 100 employees. To evaluate the engine, Dontnod collaborated with Epic Games' engineering team at various stages during production.

== Reception ==
Reception

Aggregate score
Aggregator	Score
Metacritic	(PS3) 72/100 (X360) 70/100 (PC) 65/100

Review scores
Publication	Score
Edge	8/10
Eurogamer	7/10
Game Informer	7.75/10
GameSpot	7/10
GamesRadar+	3.5/5
GameTrailers	6.8/10
IGN	5.9/10
Joystiq	2.5/5
PlayStation Official Magazine – UK	7/10
Polygon	8/10

Remember Me received "mixed or average" reviews from critics, according to review aggregator website Metacritic. The world design, soundtrack and plot were praised, while aspects of the story, design choices and combat were criticised.

Edge staff lauded Nilin as "a powerhouse of a protagonist" for possessing a blend of character traits that made her instantly likeable, and the story of reclaiming her lost memories was praised as well. The puzzles were said to be fresh and thought provoking. Eurogamer's Tom Bramwell appreciated Dontnod's work on the "refreshing" combat system. He felt the Memory Remix sequences were absorbing and said the portrayal of technology being abused was handled well. According to Ben Reeves of Game Informer, Remember Me's Memory Remixes constituted the highlight of the game, and the soundtrack was also subject to enjoyment. Kevin VanOrd at GameSpot was satisfied with the main character, calling her "a great heroine who is both powerful and vulnerable". The premise and general setting were commended, with the musical soundtrack appraised as "superb". Ryan Taljonick at GamesRadar wrote favourably of the city setting and noted that it was rich in detail. Taljonick agreed that the Memory Remix held the most excitement of all the features in the game. Justin Speer of GameTrailers thought Remember Me presented its concept with "fascinating" and "ridiculous" elements, while the manipulation of minds with the Memory Remix was described as rewarding. IGN's Daniel Krupa admired the ambition of the game. Neo-Paris was considered vibrant and distinctive, and as with the rest of reviewers, he praised the ability to remix memories. Ludwig Kietzmann at Joystiq approved of Nilin's power to manipulate memories, wishing that there were more opportunities to use it. Staff writing for OPM (UK) opined that the futuristic setting was "astonishing" and "visually arresting". Arthur Gies of Polygon endorsed the game world, story and protagonist as its most positive aspects. He argued that the combo modification system set apart an otherwise predictable combat system. Gies felt the soundtrack deserved recognition for its well-written and unique style, which he thought complemented the central theme.

Conversely, Edge staff complained that characters other than Nilin were weaker overall. The design of the Pressens combos was thought to be flawed, as the rate at which one unlocks them was too slow to use them until the final hours of the game. Though Bramwell found engagement in the first few hours, he said that the later parts of the story suffered from too many science fiction elements. The absence of external motivation for the main character was also disparaged. Reeves was dissatisfied with the characters, whose world he said was more interesting than they were, and the story was berated for being "uninspired". VanOrd observed that the game was held back by an unfulfilling story and sub-par level design. The dialogue and metaphors were criticised for dimming the story's potential. Taljonick also disliked the dialogue, with overwhelming jargon noted as one of its chief offences. The exploration was deemed restrictive, the level design claustrophobic, and the combat system "stiff". Krupa was unimpressed with the action, which he felt lacked variation and was not well executed. His delight in the setting led to disappointment with the limited exploration of it. The lack of Memory Remixes received reproval as well. Kietzmann declared Remember Me as "a listless and mediocre action game" whose appearance held more value than its performance, and objected to the combat for being "stilted" and void of excitement. PlayStation Official Magazine – UK staff became quickly disenchanted with the game as it delved into "generic fighting".

In 2017, The Daily Telegraph named Remember Me one of the best cyberpunk video games.

=== Sales ===
Remember Me's inclusion on PlayStation Plus in October 2013 and February 2014 accumulated over two million players, causing it to become the second most downloaded PlayStation Plus title in Europe. In 2016, the game became a Capcom "Platinum Title", with over 1 million units sold. CEO Oskar Guilbert admitted that while "[Remember Me] did OK", only Life Is Strange's unexpected success saved the company from "a very difficult" financial situation.

== Other media ==
Prior to the game's release, an official prelude story was published by way of a multimedia web site. The interactive site was depicted as the diary of Antoine Cartier-Wells, founder of the Memorize corporation and creator of the Sensen brain implant, and it tells the story of Memorize during the 100 years preceding the start of the game. At the time of the game's release, a 24-page print comic book written by Matt Kindt and illustrated by Matthew Southworth was released by Dark Horse Comics, as an exclusive bonus item for those who pre-ordered the game from GameStop. Dark Horse later published a 184-page hardcover book featuring concept art and developer commentary. On 20 June 2013, another official prelude story was published, this time set months before the start of the game, and centring on the character of Nilin. Titled The Pandora Archive, it was written by British novelist Scott Harrison and published by Capcom as an e-book.

== Cancelled sequel ==
By 2015, Dontnod had already completed the story for a possible sequel. Creative director Jean-Maxime Moris said "We know what we would do for Remember Me 2. The main story has been written we know what we would add to the recipe. We know what we would fix. It's a game that's ready to be made, but that decision is Capcom's to make". However, Moris added that Dontnod intended to work on another season of Life Is Strange before proceeding with the sequel to Remember Me. Dontnod Entertainment co-founder Alain Damasio said there was supposed to be a sequel "but it didn't work with Capcom".
