= Nilin (Remember Me) =

Nilin Cartier-Wells
- First appearance: Remember Me (2013)
- Created by: Jean-Maxime Moris
- Designed by: Michel Koch
- Voiced by: EN: Kezia Burrows; FR: Jessica Monceau

Nilin Cartier-Wells is a fictional character and the main protagonist of the action-adventure video game Remember Me, designed by Dontnod Entertainment and published by Capcom in 2013. Born as Nilin Cartier-Wells, she is an amnesiac freedom fighter recruited by a mysterious man named Edge to bring down Memorize, the corporation that created the memory-changing technology known as Sensen. During her mission, she must recover her stolen memories and expose the crimes committed by Memorize before finally setting out to bring them down.

Nilin was created by the game's creative director Jean-Maxime Moris, who conceived her as a believable character who would not be over-sexualised or ineffectual when compared to both other female characters and male characters in other games. The character has received mixed reviews. On the one hand, the character has been praised as breaking away from many stereotypes attached to female characters in video games. Others criticized her as being poorly portrayed and characterized, while a few saw her as reinforcing some of the genre's less desirable traits for such characters.

== Concept and development ==
Nilin was conceived by Jean-Maxime Moris, the creative director of Remember Me. When asked in an interview why the team took the decision to make the protagonist of the game a woman, Moris stated: "It was not a decision. It was something that just felt right from the beginning. It's one of those things that we never looked at from a pure, cold marketing perspective because that would have endangered the consistency of the whole game." He also stated that he wanted to portray Nilin's private and romantic life at one point, and that making the character male might also entail making him gay, which would have presented its own problems. Another reason behind the character's gender was that they were building the story to be "much more about emotion, intimacy, identity, and the way technology would intersect those." This was designed to contrast with the traditional cyberpunk theme of transhumanism, so that it "just felt like the other side of the coin, the yin and the yang, and it just made sense to us that it would be a female character." The creators wanted Nilin to stand out, so they crafted her as having a mixed ethnic origin. This meant that the character was difficult to market, as many publishers felt that a mixed race, female character would not sell as well as the stereotypical male protagonist.

Michel Koch, the game's art director, said that the team wished to "create a believable character grounded in the now, but with the addition of strong sci-fi and cyberpunk characteristics. We wanted her to feel real and slightly casual, so [the team] tried to avoid as much as we could the overly sexy approach." This resolution made the character problematic to design, as many early designs seemed too unrealistic. He also admitted that Nilin shared superficial similarities with Lisbeth Salander, the main protagonist of Stieg Larsson's Millennium series. He stated that the team wanted to take a similar approach, wishing to make Nilin a strong, independent character. The character went through several redesigns during the game's development. While Remember Me still revolved around the idea of global warming, she was dressed in a transparent cape similar to costumes seen in Blade Runner. As the game's theme changed to one of memory, the design also changed. The second main iteration of Nilin's design was designed to look more like a spy, including carrying a briefcase. A third design was created later on, but was considered too close to the character designs in the Mass Effect series. Her final design was meant to reflect a realistic evolution of then-current styles, such as including a leather jacket and jeans.

Nilin is voiced by Welsh actress Kezia Burrows. When people took to forums online criticizing her performance at the game's reveal, Moris commented that "I don't mind the criticism. It's constructive and I definitely listen to it." He decided to use the feedback to judge how the performance could be refined. The game's composer, Olivier Deriviere, created multiple musical themes for Nilin, designing each track so as to include cues related to her. The theme that actually bore her name, 'Nilin the Memory Hunter', was scattered in pieces throughout the game's score, mirroring Nilin's journey to recover and restore her memory.

== Appearances ==
As introduced in Remember Me, Nilin is the daughter of the founders of Sensen technology, Charles and Scylla Cartier-Wells. After being in a car crash that injured and embittered her mother, her father designed the Sensen to help Nilin forget her part in it. Nilin becomes a memory hunter, someone who can enter and steal memories: because of skills taught to her by her father, she could also 'remix' them to create a false memory and potentially change a person's outlook and future actions. Under unknown circumstances, she joins the Errorists, an underground movement opposed to the Sensen technology. After she manipulates a target into committing suicide, she is imprisoned in the Bastille and her memories erased. The unseen Errorist leader Edge breaks her out of prison and acts as her guide and helper during her missions. Nilin follows his orders in order to recover her lost memories, although she finds herself doubting herself and fearing recovering her memories because of what more she might have done. Eventually, she finds out her origins, and ends up remixing the memories of her parents to make them see the harm the technology is causing and allow Nilin entrance to H3O, the Memorize central server and the core of the Sensen technology. When she reaches the Central Server, Edge confirms her growing suspicion that he and H3O are one and the same, and that he led her all the way to the central server for the expressed purpose of having her kill him. Due to common use of Sensens to remove painful memories from their human users, the H3O computer had essentially become a horrific repository of countless negative memories and experiences; when it unexpectedly gained self-awareness, it found itself experiencing incredible suffering, leading to its wish to be destroyed. Nilin links mentally with the server and is confronted by H3O, a sentient entity that had developed in the Memorize servers from the vast collection of painful memories, who informs her that Edge was an aspect of him, created and released into the world specifically to bring down Memorize by organizing the Errorist movement, and in the process, put an end to H3O. He also tells her that as long as he exists the horrors of Sensen abuse will continue until they eventually overwhelm the entire population, meaning that Nilin must destroy H3O. When Nilin expresses reluctance at the prospect of killing him, H3O spawns multiple hostile remembrances to force her to fight him. Nilin finally destroys Edge/H3O, releasing the stored memories into the general population. In his last moments, H3O thanks her for putting an end to his pain. With her mind now restored, Nilin resolves to help heal the damage Sensen has done to the world.

== Critical reception ==
Nilin has received mixed reviews from gaming sites. The review for Edge Magazine was very positive, calling Nilin "a powerhouse of a protagonist, instantly likable and remaining self-aware throughout. She's a beguiling mix of strength and sensitivity, sarcasm and fire, external certainty and internal conflict, despite a few cheesy lines and missteps." Game Informer's Ben Reeves called Nilin "a capable warrior and memory hunter", but stated that she "[failed] to have much of a personality of her own". GameTrailers's Justin Speer commented that Nilin "treats the insanity of the world around her with unwavering seriousness." Polygon's Arthur Gies called Nilin one of Remember Me's "greatest strengths". GameSpot's Kevin VanOrd cited the character as the most memorable section of the game, saying that her skills made her "an appealing game lead", while her story made her "an intriguing individual." He also praised Burrow's performance in the role. Eurogamer's Tom Bramwell called Nilin a "compelling lead", saying that despite rough writing "whenever the game takes her out of a fight and has her fiddling with memories or talking to grown-ups, there's a good bit of heart and pathos." In an article concerning her, Kotaku's Evan Narcisse praised the fact that Nilin did not have racial stereotypes attached to her character, and that her quest in the game was not driven by an ethnic-derived social situation.

In contrast, VideoGamer.com's Nick Akerman was highly critical of Nilin's role in the game, saying that she was a "damsel in distress and sacrificial lamb for a greater good that will only aid a capitalistic dystopia produced by the science of men. It's a step back for females in games, as while deemed capable enough of fighting against France's underbelly, Nilin does so in a narrative that is apparently beyond her intellectual capability; even though she's shown to be more than smart enough to work it all out." Destructoid's James Stephanie Sterling was also quite critical, calling her "as bad as, if not worse, than many of the villains", and finding her unexplored darker side in the face of her heroic portrayal "immensely troubling." Complex called Nilin "one of the most poorly written characters of the year (whom in very Crofitan fashion does an emotional 180 from simpering victim to inexorable killing machine in about five minutes)." Brenna Hillier of VG247, in an article concerning the character as a whole, praised the idea behind Nilin and the potential for the game to break many conventions surrounding female characters in the medium. However she also felt that the character was let down by the expectations of the industry and much of what was done to promote the game and character, and that following a man's instructions throughout much of the game weakened her independent image.
