= Tormund Giantsbane =

Character in A Song of Ice and Fire and Game of Thrones

- A Song of Ice and Fire character Game of Thrones character
- Kristofer Hivju as Tormund Giantsbane
- First appearance: Literature: A Storm of Swords (2000); Television: "Valar Dohaeris" (2013)
- Last appearance: Television: "The Iron Throne" (2019)
- Created by: George R. R. Martin
- Portrayed by: Kristofer Hivju

In-universe information
- Aliases: Tormund Giantsbane; Tormund Giantsbabe; Tormund Giantstink; Mead-King of Ruddy Hall; Tormund Thunderfist; Tormund Horn-Blower; Tormund Tall-Talker; Breaker of Ice; Husband to Bears; Speaker to Gods; Father of Hosts
- Gender: Male
- Children: Toregg; Torwynd; Dormund; Dryn; Munda
- Nationality: Westerosi

Tormund Giantsbane is a fictional character in the A Song of Ice and Fire series of fantasy novels by American author George R. R. Martin and its television adaptation, Game of Thrones.

Introduced in 2000's A Storm of Swords, he is a renowned wildling leader and chief lieutenant of Mance Rayder, the King-Beyond-The-Wall. He subsequently appeared in Martin's A Dance with Dragons. Although initially antagonistic towards Jon Snow and the Night's Watch, he later proves to be a crucial ally in their fight against the White Walkers.

Tormund Giantsbane is portrayed by Norwegian actor Kristofer Hivju in the HBO television adaptation, for which he has received positive reviews.

== Character ==
Tormund, better known as Tormund Giantsbane or Tormund Thunderfist, is a famous wildling raider. He wears golden bands engraved with runes of the First Men on his massive arms, passed down from his forefathers. Tormund is armored with heavy ringmail taken from a dead Night's Watch ranger. Like most of the wildlings, he is illiterate. He has four sons: Toregg, Torwynd, Dryn, and Dormund; and one daughter, Munda.

The often jovial Tormund enjoys food and drink, especially ale and mead, and likes cracking dick jokes. He is styled Tall-talker, Horn-blower and Breaker of Ice, Husband to Bears, the Mead-king of Ruddy Hall, Speaker to Gods and Father of Hosts. Mance Rayder named him Horn-blower for the power of Tormund's lungs, as it is said that Tormund can laugh the snow off mountaintops. Although Tormund is said to have slain a giant, he claims to have actually cut open the belly of a sleeping giantess and slept in her for warmth during a winter storm. Tormund claims the giantess, thinking he was a babe, then suckled him for three months in the spring. Tormund also claims to have once drunkenly slept with a bear.

Tormund once thought to make himself King-Beyond-the-Wall, but he was defeated by Mance Rayder. He distrusts the men of the Frozen Shore.

== Storylines ==
=== In the books ===
Tormund is not a point-of-view character in the novels, so his actions are witnessed and interpreted exclusively through the eyes of Jon Snow.

==== A Storm of Swords ====
When Jon Snow is captured, Tormund is among those gathered in Mance Rayder's tent when Jon is presented to Mance. Jon is later attached to Tormund's war party, with Ygritte and Longspear Ryk joining as well. Tormund is friendly towards Jon, and Jon grows quite fond of him despite the distrust. Tormund joins in the singing of "The Last of the Giants" and encourages Jon to sleep with Ygritte.

During the battle beneath the Wall, Jon spots Tormund and two of his sons near a siege turtle. When Jon goes to meet with Mance for the Night's Watch, Tormund is the first to greet him. He brings Jon to Mance's tent and defends Jon's right to speak, and during the negotiation, Mance threatens to have Tormund blow the Horn of Winter to bring down the Wall. When Stannis Baratheon attacks the wildlings, Tormund leads a triple line of spearmen but is flanked and routed by Stannis's knights. Tormund escapes capture, but his son Dormund is killed by Ser Richard Horpe.

==== A Dance with Dragons ====
With Mance a captive at Castle Black, Tormund leads a band of four thousand free folk beyond the Wall. He is forced to kill one of his sons, Torwynd, who dies from a chill and later rises as a wight. Tormund's daughter, Munda, marries Longspear Ryk, much to his chagrin.

Jon Snow, now Lord Commander of the Night's Watch, and other officers expect that Tormund will besiege the undermanned Wall again. Jon sends Mance Rayder's sister-in-law, Val, to find Tormund and offer him peace. When Jon meets with Tormund, Tormund dislikes the terms offered by the Night's Watch but agrees because of the increasing attacks by the Others and the need to get his people south of the Wall. According to the terms, the free folk must give their valuables to the Watch to help pay for food, while each of their chiefs must send a son as a hostage. This rule is put in place to prevent the free folk from raiding lands in Westeros. Tormund gives over his gold wristbands, but though Jon insists he keep them because of their personal importance to Tormund, Tormund refuses; he will not let it be said he made the rest of his people give up their wealth while he kept his. Tormund also confides in a sympathetic Jon about losing his son.

As part of the peace, the free folk warriors help the Night's Watch brothers garrison the abandoned castles along the Wall to defend it from the Others, while the non-martial free folk will be settled on the Gift and the New Gift. Jon re-garrisons Oakenshield as Tormund's seat, and takes on Tormund's son Dryn as his page. Another son, Toregg, burns the dead to prevent them from becoming wights.

When Cotter Pyke 's Eastwatch fleet reports back on desperate situations at Hardhome, Jon asks Tormund to help him rescue the stranded wildlings there. Later, Jon receives a threatening letter from Ramsay Bolton. Jon discusses the situation with Tormund for two hours. Tormund agrees to lead the ranging to Hardhome in Jon's stead while Jon deals with Ramsay. Jon calls for volunteers to march with him to Winterfell and confront Ramsay and the wildlings. However, after the meeting, Jon is attacked and stabbed by mutineers led by Bowen Marsh.

=== In the show ===
Kristofer Hivju plays Tormund in the television adaptation of the book series. He is one of Mance's top generals, fierce and terrifying in combat.

==== Season 3 ====
When Jon Snow first arrives in the wildling camp, Jon initially mistakes Tormund for Mance Rayder, much to Tormund's amusement. Mance directs Tormund to lead a group of wildlings, including Jon Snow and his captor, Ygritte, south of the Wall to await the signal of Mance Rayder to attack the Night's Watch.

==== Season 4 ====
After joining up with a clan of the cannibalistic Thenns, Tormund leads the wildlings in a rampage through the lands south of the Wall, including a sack of Mole's Town. During the Battle of Castle Black, he duels and severely wounds Ser Alliser Thorne but is brought down by several arrows and taken prisoner. After his wounds are healed by Maester Aemon, Jon briefly talks with him, and Tormund tells Jon that Ygritte loved him, citing Ygritte's apparent desire to kill him as proof. He asks Jon to burn Ygritte's body north of the Wall.

==== Season 5 ====
Tormund is later present at Mance's execution and is saddened by his friend's death. Jon frees Tormund, and they journey to Hardhome, where Tormund attempts to convince the local wildlings to ally with the Night's Watch against the White Walkers. When Hardhome is overrun by wights, Tormund and Jon fight them off, and they, along with the surviving wildlings, escape to the boats. Jon takes Tormund and the wildlings south of the Wall and into Westeros.

==== Season 6 ====
After Jon's assassination by Ser Alliser and his mutineers, Tormund and the wildlings are summoned by Edd Tollett to help capture them. Jon is later resurrected by the red priestess Melisandre, and Tormund tells him that some of the wildlings believe him to be a god. Several days later, Jon's half-sister Sansa Stark arrives at the Wall fleeing her abusive husband, Ramsay Bolton. Tormund is attracted to Brienne of Tarth and attempts to court her, although she does not seem interested in his advances. After Ramsay sends a letter to Jon threatening to kill Jon's half-brother Rickon and the wildlings if Sansa is not returned, Tormund persuades the wildlings to help Jon and Sansa defeat the Boltons. Tormund later participates in the Battle of the Bastards, killing Lord Smalljon Umber, biting off his ear in the process. Following the battle, he is amongst those who declare Jon the king in the North.

==== Season 7 ====
Jon asks Tormund and the wildlings to reinforce defenses at Eastwatch-by-the-Sea, the Night's Watch fortress closest to Hardhome. Later, scouts find the Brotherhood Without Banners and Sandor Clegane attempting to pass through the Wall and intern them in Eastwatch's ice cells.

Later, Jon, Davos Seaworth, Jorah Mormont, and Gendry arrive, revealing that they need to capture a wight in order to convince Daenerys Targaryen and Cersei Lannister of the White Walkers' existence. Although displeased at having to ally with Jeor Mormont's son, Tormund, the Brotherhood and the Hound join Jon's allies beyond the Wall. They successfully capture a wight but are soon surrounded by the White Walkers and their army of wights. However, Daenerys arrives with her dragons to rescue them, but one of the dragons, Viserion, is killed by the Night King. As the Night King prepares to attack again, they are forced to leave Jon behind when Jon tells them to flee, but he manages to return to Eastwatch. Tormund remains at Eastwatch while Jon, Daenerys, the Hound, and Jorah travel to King's Landing.

Soon after, the White Walkers and their army finally march on the Wall. The Night King, who has reanimated Viserion, uses the dragon to destroy Eastwatch and the section of the Wall behind the castle, allowing the army of the dead to march on the Seven Kingdoms and seemingly trapping Tormund and Beric Dondarrion on top of the remaining part of the Wall.

==== Season 8 ====
Tormund and Beric manage to escape the Wall and retreat to Winterfell. Along the way, they stop at Last Hearth and find it has already been overwhelmed by the White Walkers. They encounter Dolorous Edd and the Night's Watch. Tormund realises that they must reach Winterfell to warn its defenders of the dead's proximity, and arrive on the eve of the White Walkers' arrival. Tormund fights in the ensuing battle and is amongst the survivors when the Night King is finally defeated. Afterward, Tormund tells Jon that he and his people are returning to their lands beyond the Wall after the worst of winter has passed. Jon asks him to take his direwolf, Ghost, with him, saying Ghost belongs in the far North.

Following Daenerys massacring King's Landing after the city surrenders to her, Jon tries but fails to dissuade her from further destruction and ultimately assassinates her, for which he is exiled to the Night's Watch. Tormund and Ghost are reunited with Jon when he arrives at Castle Black. Jon and Ghost accompany Tormund as he leads the wildlings to return to their lands beyond the Wall.

== Reception ==
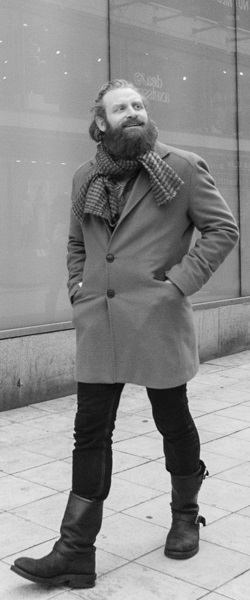
Kristofer Hivju plays the role of Tormund Giantsbane in the television series

=== Recognition and awards ===
Norwegian actor Kristofer Hivju has received critical acclaim for his performance as Tormund Giantsbane in the television series. He and the rest of the cast were nominated for Screen Actors Guild Awards for Outstanding Performance by an Ensemble in a Drama Series in 2014.
