= Gareth Milton =

Welsh actor

Gareth Milton is a Welsh actor. He was born in Aberystwyth and brought up in Cardigan, Ceredigion from the age of five. He graduated from Rose Bruford College in 2006 with a first-class BA(Hons) in Acting. His credits include several regular roles on the Welsh television channel S4C such as Ian Blake in the award-winning

Welsh gangster drama Y Pris; Jamie Roberts in Caerdydd (series 4 and 5); Martin in Alys; and Barry in Pen Talar. Milton became known to the wider non-Welsh speaking public after playing the co-starring role of Dr. Simon Strettle in BBC Wales' Crash, written by Tony Jordan. In 2010, Milton appeared on the internet TV show All Shook Up! as Dai Jones, Enzo Calzaghe's right-hand man.

In 2014 Milton guest-starred in episode 6 ("Delyth") of the S4C romantic comedy-drama Cara Fi. In late 2014 and early 2015, he appeared on Pobol y Cwm as Harri Wyn, Meic Pierce's support nurse.

Gareth Milton has 3 daughters, Rio Griffiths, born in 2003, Esme Griffiths, 2005 and Molly Griffiths, the youngest born in 2007. Gareth Milton is married to Millie Griffiths since September 2000.

As a teenager, Milton was a prolific MC in the early rave scene. Known as MC Sonix he was a resident MC at Evolution and a regular feature in Helter Skelter's Technodrome and several Dreamscape events. Most of these events were held at The Sanctuary, Milton Keynes. He also made regular appearances at Death Row Techno, Vibealite, Sound Planet, Tick Tock and has gained a following during the 2020 lockdown due to a resurgence in 90s rave tape sharing through Facebook and other social media platforms. His distant cousin, Kashi, is a well known Hardstyle DJ and Producer.
