= Christine Pritchard =

Welsh actress (1943–2023)

- Born: 6 August 1943; Caernarfon, Wales
- Died: 14 February 2023 (aged 79); Bangor, Wales
- Occupation: Actress

Christine Pritchard (6 August 1943 – 14 February 2023) was a Welsh actress. She was best known in Wales for her role as the titular character in Rala Rwdins, a children's show on S4C in the 1990s. She featured in numerous Welsh language films and television series, such as Glas y Dorlan, Dinas, Pobol y Cwm, Cara Fi, and Anita. Her other roles included appearances on The Indian Doctor, Doctors and Stella. On stage she performed regularly with Theatr Genedlaethol Cymru. the Welsh-language national theatre of Wales.

== Early life and education ==
Born in Caernarfon, Pritchard grew up in a bilingual household speaking Welsh and English. She attended Sir Hugh Owen School, and studied English, Latin, and drama at Bristol University. Upon graduating, she taught English and French on Saint Kitts in the Caribbean, as part of the Voluntary Service Overseas scheme. After returning to the UK, she taught drama in Putney, London, where she produced school plays.

== Acting career ==
=== Stage ===
Pritchard joined the newly formed Cwmni Theatr Cymru in Bangor, making her debut in the lead role in Roedd Catarina o Gwympas Ddoe (Catarina Was Around Yesterday) in 1970. In 1974, she toured the United States with The Pryderi Players, which was sponsored by the Welsh Arts Council to promote the works of Welsh writers.

In later years, Pritchard appeared in numerous other plays, including the Cwmni Theatr Gwynedd production Ddoe yn Ol (Yesterday Again), a Welsh adaptation of Henrik Ibsen's Ghosts, in 1994. In the mid-1990s, Pritchard co-starred with Owen Garmon in Fel Anifail by Meic Povey at the National Eisteddfod, and received additional funding from the Arts Council to tour across Wales.

In 2008 she was a founding member of the women's theatre company Theatr Pena which revived classic plays with significant roles for women.

=== Television ===
In the 1970s, Pritchard transitioned from the stage to television, appearing in shows such as Glas y Dorlan. In the 1980s, she played Ruth Gregory, an executive headhunter, in the S4C soap opera Dinas (City), a Welsh series which drew comparisons to the American TV series Dallas.

In the 1990s, Pritchard starred in two of the most popular shows on S4C, including Rala Rwdins and Pobol y Cwm. In 2014, she appeared in the romantic comedy Cara Fi (Love Me) as pub landlady and "fiery matriarch" Nancy. She also appeared in programmes such as Anita, Keeping Faith (Un Bore Mercher), and 35 Awr.

=== Film ===
Pritchard starred in the 1994 film, Wild Justice, playing Margaret Hughes.

=== Radio ===
Pritchard had a regular role on the BBC Radio Cymru soap opera, Eileen/Rhydeglwys.
