= Kezia Burrows =

Welsh actress

Kezia Burrows is a Welsh actress, known for playing Dr Cath Llewelyn in the BBC Wales medical drama Crash from 2009 to 2010.

== Life and career ==
Born in Neath, she lived in Porthcawl and then Carmarthen but cites being from the seaside Cardigan village New Quay, where both her parents are from. Burrows trained at RADA, graduating in 2004. She first took roles in various theatre productions.

She made her first television appearance in ITV1's The Capgras Tide, before starring in the 2009 BBC Wales medical drama Crash as Dr Cath Llewelyn. Television work includes more recently the remake of The Snow Spider in 2020, Apple Tree Yard & Doctor Foster.

In 2013, Burrows voiced Nilin, the protagonist of the action-adventure video game Remember Me. Since her first game she has both voiced and mocapped / performance captured a combined total of over 100 games, amongst them likeness and performance capture for Amanda Ripley in 2014's Alien Isolation, likeness voice and performance capture for Cass Vallance in Star Citizen / Squadron 42.

== Filmography ==
=== Film ===
Year	Title	Role	Notes
2009	The Capgras Tide	Anna	Short film
2011	Panic Button	Newsreader	
2011	Lamia	Lamia	Short film
2012	The Dial	Jane	Direct-to-video
2012	Way of the Monkey's Claw	Bethesda the Evil Priestess	
2013	Magpie	Grace	
2014	Viking: The Berserkers	The Volva	
2016	Summer Leaves	Charlotte Combs	Short film
2016	Kingsglaive: Final Fantasy XV	Miscellaneous Characters (voice)	
2017	The Crypt	Melanie	Short film
2017	The Lost Viking	Herja	
2018	Heart's Ease	Sergeant Moss	Short film
TBA	Eider Steeps	Elisa	

=== Television ===
Year	Title	Role	Notes
2009–2010	Crash	Dr. Cath Llewellyn	12 episodes
2010, 2014	Casualty	Cheryl Moran, Cassie Blackmore	3 episodes
2011–2013	Kezzycat	Gem, Ivory, Army	3 episodes; also executive producer
2011	PhoneShop	Kimberly	Episode: "Come Dine with Me"
2014, 2016, 2021	Doctors	Gil Chadwick, Sarah Garrod, Kelly Beck	4 episodes
2016	Beowulf: Return to the Shieldlands	Dayna	Episode: "Episode 4"
2017	Apple Tree Yard	Kate Costley	3 episodes
2017	Doctor Foster	Chrissie	Episode #2.2
2020	The Snow Spider	Glenys Griffiths	5 episodes
2023	Wolf	Veronica	3 episodes

=== Video games ===
Year	Title	Role	Notes
2012	007 Legends		Performance capture various
2013	Remember Me	Nilin	Voice & performance capture
2014	Alien: Isolation	Amanda Ripley	Likeness & performance capture
2015	Everybody's Gone to the Rapture	Diana Davies, June Fletcher	Voice
2016	XCOM 2	UK Soldier	Voice
2017	Sniper Elite 4		Performance capture
2017	Horizon: Zero Dawn	Aloy	Performance capture
2017	Destiny 2		Performance capture
2019	Observation	Dr. Emma Fisher	Voice & performance capture
2019	GreedFall	Síora, Other Characters	Voice
2020	Beyond a Steel Sky		Performance capture
2021	Bravely Default II	Gladys	Voice
2021	Forza Horizon 5		Performance capture
2022	Horizon Forbidden West		Performance capture
2022	Elden Ring	Sorceress Sellen, Female Protagonist 3	Voice
2023	Final Fantasy XVI	Additional voices	Voice & performance capture
2024	Dragon's Dogma 2	Additional NPC Voices	Voice
2026	Mewgenics	Cats	Voice
2026	Silent Hill: Townfall	Zoe Ellis	Voice
TBA	Star Citizen	Cass Vallon	Voice & performance capture
TBA	Squadron 42	Cass Vallon	Voice & performance capture
