= Cara Fi =

- Also known as: Love Me
- Genre: romantic comedy, drama
- Created by: Sarah Dollard
- Written by: Sarah Dollard; Pete McTighe; Llinos Mai; Catrin Clarke; Angharad Devonald
- Directed by: Gareth Bryn; Andy Newbery
- Starring: Christine Pritchard; Rhian Jones; Saran Morgan; Steffan Rhodri; Gareth Pierce; Gwydion Rhys; Gaynor Morgan Rees; Iwan John
- Composer: Richard James
- Country of origin: United Kingdom
- Original language: Welsh
- No. of series: 1
- No. of episodes: 8

Production
- Executive producers: Sarah Dollard; Philip Trethowan
- Producer: Laura Cotton
- Production locations: Pembrokeshire, Wales
- Running time: 48 minutes
- Production company: Touchpaper Wales

Original release
- Network: S4C
- Release: 9 November – 28 December 2014

Cara Fi (Love Me) is a Welsh romantic comedy-drama series that first broadcast in November 2014 on S4C, and was later made available on the BBC iPlayer. The eight-part series was created by Sarah Dollard. In 2015 the show was nominated for the BAFTA Cymru awards for costume design and for original music.

== Plot ==
When a sleepy seaside village in Wales runs out of women, the locals try to turn things around by advertising their single men on the side of milk cartons leaving the dairy. Each episode focuses on a new woman arriving in the village to be set up with a local man.

The milk scheme is the brainchild of pub landlady Nancy Hopkins (Christine Pritchard), whose chief goal is to find a wife for her son, Will (Iwan John), so he won't move away from Tretarw. Unbeknownst to Nancy, Will is gay.

The series kicks off as Nancy's daughter, newly-single Nina (Rhian Jones), moves back to the village with her own daughter Lee (Saran Morgan). Nancy is determined to reunite Nina with her high-school sweetheart, pub chef Vic Reed (Steffan Rhodri). Much to Nancy's irritation, Nina instead hits it off with the nerdy, earnest local doctor, Brian (Gareth Pierce).

== Main cast ==
- Christine Pritchard as Nancy Hopkins, pub landlady
- Rhian Jones as Nina Hopkins, Nancy's daughter
- Saran Morgan as Lee Rees-Hopkins, Nina's daughter
- Iwan John as Will Hopkins, Nancy's son
- Steffan Rhodri as Vic Reed, pub chef
- Gareth Pierce as Brian Phelps, local GP
- Gwydion Rhys as Dai Jones
- Gaynor Morgan Rees as Betty Jones

== Episodes ==
No.	Title	Directed by	Written by	Original release date
1	"Alys"	Gareth Bryn	Sarah Dollard	9 November 2014
Pub landlady Nancy Hopkins sets out to save her ailing village by advertising local single men on the side of every milk carton leaving the dairy.
2	"Sali"	Gareth Bryn	Sarah Dollard	16 November 2014
Nancy’s plan to repopulate her dying village looks as if it’s succeeding when Sali comes to town, apparently looking for love. Unfortunately, Sali is under the misapprehension that the milk scheme is actually a reality TV show.
3	"Manon"	Gareth Bryn	Pete McTighe	23 November 2014
4	"Violet"	Gareth Bryn	Unknown	30 November 2014
Guest starring Lisa Jên Brown as Violet.
5	"Carys"	Andy Newbery	Angharad Devonald	7 December 2014
Love at first milk carton
6	"Delyth"	Andy Newbery	Llinos Mai	14 December 2014
Guest starring Rebecca Harries as Delyth, Ioan Hefin as Aled and Gareth Milton as Dan.
7	"Megan"	Andy Newbery	Sarah Dollard	21 December 2014
Guest starring Lowri Walton as Megan Gartside.
8	"Sion"	Andy Newbery	Pete McTighe	28 December 2014
Guest starring Rhys ap William as Sion Lawson and Lowri Walton as Megan Gartside.

== Production ==
Cara Fi is set in the fictional Pembrokeshire village of Tretarw, but the plight of the area - an increase in holiday homes and an exodus of young people - is a very real problem faced by villages in rural Wales. Series producer Laura Cotton, who grew up in the area, said that the subject matter of the show was very close to her heart. "I wanted to come back and make it here, where I'm from, and show what an amazing, beautiful place it is", she said. "We were very aware of what is happening to small towns and villages, like my home town of Trefin, where most of the houses are now owned by holidaymakers".

Filming on Cara Fi began near Cardiff in March 2014, with the location shoot moving to Little Haven in Pembrokeshire in April. The shoot took place in and around The Swan Inn, renamed Yr Angor for the show. The owner of The Swan Inn, Paul Morris, said that the Cara Fi cast and crew had been welcome visitors to Little Haven, bringing a boost to the local economy.

Steffan Rhodri, best known for roles in Gavin & Stacey and Harry Potter and the Deathly Hallows – Part 1, said the quality of the show's script is what attracted him to the part: "What's so often missing from Welsh comedy is a genuine wit, and this has it".

The Welsh language series, produced by Touchpaper Television, began screening on S4C in November 2014, with English subtitles, and subsequently became available on the BBC iPlayer.

== See also ==
- List of Welsh television series
