= Joy Wilkinson =

British screenwriter and playwright

- Occupations: Screenwriter, playwright, author, director
- Known for: The Sweet Science of Bruising, Doctor Who

Joy Wilkinson is a British screenwriter, playwright, author, and director.

== Early life ==
Wilkinson was born in Burnley, Lancashire. At age 14, she co-wrote Fried Eggs & Fag Ends, a play at the Lancashire Young Writers Festival that got reviewed in The Guardian by David Ward. She worked as a journalist, before winning the Verity Bargate Award.

== Career ==
Wilkinson has written several plays, such as Britain’s Best Recruiting Sergeant, Fair and The Sweet Science of Bruising, which opened at Southwark Playhouse in 2018. In 2015, she was announced as a Screen Daily Star of Tomorrow for her thriller screenplay, Killer Résumé, which landed her on the 2014 Brit List. She adapted Qiu Xiaolong's Inspector Chen Cao for BBC Radio 4, as well as several Agatha Christie adaptations. Among them were Ordeal by Innocence, Sparkling Cyanide and The Pale Horse. In 2021, she wrote an adaptation of Hope Mirrlees' Lud-in-the-Mist for BBC Radio 4.

On television, Wilkinson wrote for Doctors, Holby City, Casualty and Land Girls. In 2012, Wilkinson adapted The Life and Adventures of Nicholas Nickleby as a five-part miniseries for BBC One. In 2018, she contributed the eighth episode of the eleventh series of Doctor Who, "The Witchfinders". Wilkinson would novelise her episode as part of the Target Collection, and later wrote the short story The Simple Things. She wrote the comic strip Black Powder for Doctor Who Magazine in 2021. She co-wrote the fourth episode of The Watch, which is inspired by the Ankh-Morpork City Watch from the Discworld series of fantasy novels by Terry Pratchett. On March 17, 2022, it was announced that Wilkinson would be writing a feature adaptation of Kevin J. Anderson and Steven L. Sears’ Stalag-X, to be directed by Francis Lawrence.

In 2020, her directorial debut, the period short film Ma'am, was released. It won at the Emerging Talent Awards at the New Renaissance Film Festival. Wilkinson wrote and directed a follow-up short film, The Everlasting Club in 2021. In 2023, Wilkinson began production on her feature film debut, the low-budget thriller 7 Keys.

== Filmography ==
Year	Title	Notes	Broadcaster
2006–12	Doctors	Wrote 36 episodes	BBC One
2006	Casualty	Episode: "Heads Together"	BBC One
2006	Holby City	Episode: "One for My Baby"	BBC One
2011	Land Girls	Episode: "Farewell My Lovely"	BBC One
2012	The Life and Adventures of Nick Nickleby	Wrote 4 episodes	BBC One
2018	Doctor Who	Episode: "The Witchfinders"	BBC One
2020	Ma'am	Also director	
2021	The Watch	Co-wrote: "Twilight Canyons"	BBC America
2021	The Everlasting Club	Also director	
2022	The Pact	Series 2, Wrote Episodes 4 & 5	BBC One
2023	Lockwood & Co.	Wrote 3 episodes	Netflix
2024	Suspect	Series 2, Co-writer with David Allison	Channel 4
2024	7 Keys	Feature film, Also director	
2027	The Twin	Miniseries	Netflix
