= In the Grey =

2026 film by Guy Ritchie

- Theatrical release poster
- Directed by: Guy Ritchie
- Written by: Guy Ritchie
- Produced by: John Friedberg; Dave Caplan; Guy Ritchie; Ivan Atkinson
- Starring: Henry Cavill; Jake Gyllenhaal; Eiza Gonzalez; Kristofer Hivju; Fisher Stevens; Rosamund Pike
- Cinematography: Ed Wild
- Edited by: Martin Walsh
- Music by: Christopher Benstead
- Production companies: C2; Toff Guy Films
- Distributed by: Black Bear Pictures
- Release date: May 15, 2026
- Running time: 97 minutes
- Country: United States
- Language: English
- Budget: $70 million
- Box office: $27.8 million

In the Grey is a 2026 American action thriller film written, produced, and directed by Guy Ritchie. The film follows a lawyer and her team of fixers as they try to recover a one-billion-dollar debt from a criminal organization. Produced by Black Bear Pictures, the film stars Henry Cavill, Jake Gyllenhaal, Eiza Gonzalez, Kristofer Hivju, Fisher Stevens, Rosamund Pike, and Carlos Bardem.

In the Grey was released in North America on May 15, 2026. The film received mixed reviews from critics.

== Plot ==
Cutthroat lawyer Rachel Wild specializes in recovering debts for rich and powerful clients, including asset management firm Spencer Goldstein. To uncover her targets’ hidden assets and pressure them into repayment, she relies on the extralegal talents of partners Sid and Bronco, her trusted clandestine operatives.

Rachel’s mentor Braxton arrives at the Spanish island controlled by ruthless billionaire Manny Salazar, arranging to settle Salazar’s $1 billion debt to Spencer Goldstein. Instead, Salazar has Braxton killed by his head of security, Olsson. Rachel negotiates with Spencer Goldstein executive Bobby Sheen to recover the debt herself, deploying Sid and Bronco on a campaign of sabotage, bribery, and subterfuge.

Salazar faces millions in losses as Sid and his accomplice Gucci halt his construction projects, while Bronco and his right hand man Baker cripple his oil rig. Bronco plants a listening device in the office of Salazar’s attorney, William Horowitz, and Sid does the same to Wolfgang Klose, the financier hiding Salazar’s illicit fortune. Rachel has Salazar’s private jet and yacht impounded, provoking him into arranging to meet on his island.

Sid and Bronco enlist Gucci, Baker, getaway driver Moreno, and pilot Dunne to secure the island, acquiring an arsenal of weapons and vehicles. Outnumbered by Salazar’s private army as well as the local police force on his payroll, the operatives prepare a range of contingency plans for evacuating Rachel, and Sid has himself briefly jailed to surveil the police station.

Rachel meets with Salazar, who refuses to pay back more than $400 million and tries to have her killed, but Sid and Bronco’s team gun down fourteen of Salazar’s men to save her. The attempt on Rachel’s life allows her to maneuver against Salazar in court, with a string of legal victories and her operatives’ espionage leading to the seizure of more of his empire. Salazar agrees to pay his full debt and has Olsson dispose of Horowitz. Rachel informs Bobby, who receives the firm’s congratulations.

Three months later, Rachel is abducted by Salazar. Having repaid his debt, he demands that Spencer Goldstein return his key assets, though Rachel reveals that the firm has also failed to pay her. After confronting Bobby, Sid and Bronco gather their team to rescue Rachel from the island. Restoring their previous contingency plans, they break her out of the police station and head to the airstrip. Salazar’s men give chase and drone-strike the team's hangar, killing Dunne and destroying their gyrocopters.

Switching plans, the operatives eliminate multiple attackers by leading them through a booby-trapped banana plantation. The team retreats to a countryside villa, and are soon surrounded in an intense shootout. Baker sacrifices himself to detonate the building as the others escape by tunnel. Pursued by Olsson in a helicopter, Sid and Bronco kill him with a rocket launcher, and successfully extract Rachel to a waiting ship.

Sid and Bronco kidnap Salazar, delivering him to authorities in Miami locked in a shipping container. Rachel deduces that Bobby double-crossed her by withholding Salazar’s assets, and informs Bobby that Salazar will provide evidence against Spencer Goldstein’s role in his criminal empire. Having secured her payment, Rachel leaves Bobby to face the consequences.

== Cast ==
- Henry Cavill as Sid
- Jake Gyllenhaal as Bronco Beauregard
- Eiza Gonzalez as Rachel Wild
- Kristofer Hivju as Axel Oloffson
- Emmett J. Scanlan as Mick Dunne
- Jason Wong as Gucci
- Michael Vu as Ed Glover
- Fisher Stevens as Mr. Horowitz, Salazar's lawyer
- Rosamund Pike as Bobby Sheen
- Carlos Bardem as Manny Salazar
- Kojo Attah as Andre Baker
- Christian Ochoa Lavernia as Jonathan Morena

== Production ==
In May 2023, Guy Ritchie announced that he would write and direct an untitled action film, with Black Bear International handling international sales for the project as it was brought to the Cannes Film Market. Henry Cavill, Jake Gyllenhaal, and Eiza González, who had all previously collaborated with Ritchie, were announced as starring in the project. Ivan Atkinson and John Friedberg, additional collaborators of Ritchie's, would produce with him as well. In October 2023, Carlos Bardem and Fisher Stevens were revealed to be part of the cast. In April 2024, Rosamund Pike was also revealed to have joined the cast.

The production was granted an interim agreement allowing the actors to work on the film during the 2023 SAG-AFTRA strike. Filming began in September 2023 on Tenerife in the Canary Islands and ended in late October 2023. Early production took place in the Real Casino de Tenerife in Plaza de la Candelaria, before moving to San Andrés, Santa Cruz de Tenerife to film at the fishing dock and Las Teresitas beach areas, with some chase scenes through the village.

== Release ==
In the Grey was released in the United States on May 15, 2026. It was previously scheduled to release on January 17, 2025, and April 10, 2026.

In October 2023, Lionsgate purchased American distribution rights to the film. Initially scheduled to be released in the United States on January 17, 2025, Lionsgate pulled the film from its release schedule in November 2024 as post-production on it was not finished in time for that release date. By November 2025, Lionsgate had decided it would release the American distribution rights, and Black Bear Pictures would find a new buyer or distribute themselves, ultimately choosing the latter in January 2026.

Black Bear International handled international sales on the film, in addition to distributing in the United Kingdom and Ireland directly and in Canada through Elevation Pictures.

== Reception ==
=== Box office ===
As of September 8, 2026, In the Grey has grossed $5.7 million in the United States and Canada, and $22.1 million in other territories, for a worldwide total of $27.8 million.

In the United States and Canada, In the Grey was released alongside Obsession and Is God Is, and was projected to gross around $4 million from 2,018 theaters in its opening weekend. It went on to debut to $2.9 million, finishing ninth at the box office.

=== Critical response ===
On the review aggregator website Rotten Tomatoes, 53% of 75 critics' reviews are positive, with an average rating of 5.7/10. The website's consensus reads: "Pitting together charismatic stars in an underpowered caper, Guy Ritchie's In the Grey is a slick action vehicle whose lack of fresh ideas ultimately put its entertainment value in the red." Metacritic, which uses a weighted average, assigned the film a score of 53 out of 100, based on 16 critics, indicating "mixed or average" reviews. Audiences surveyed by CinemaScore gave the film an average grade of "B" on an A+ to F scale, while 64% of those polled by PostTrak said they would "definitely recommend" it.
