= The Twin (TV series) =

British television miniseries

- Based on: Twin (2019) by Kristoffer Metcalfe
- Written by: Sarah Dollard; Hanna Jameson; Scout Cripps; Kam Odedra; Joy Wilkinson
- Directed by: Jeremy Lovering
- Starring: Jamie Dornan; Mackenzie Davis
- Country of origin: United Kingdom
- Original language: English
- No. of series: 1
- No. of episodes: 6

Production
- Executive producers: Sarah Dollard; Jamie Dornan; Jeremy Lovering; Nira Park; Rachael Prior; David Flynn; Paul Lee
- Production companies: Complete Fiction; wiip

Original release
- Network: Netflix

The Twin is an upcoming British television miniseries for Netflix starring Jamie Dornan as identical twins. It is an adaptation of the Norwegian series Twin.

== Premise ==
Adam and Nicola are stuck in a loveless marriage but the return of Adam's identical twin Lee affects their life.

== Cast ==
- Jamie Dornan as Adam and Lee
- Mackenzie Davis as Nicola
- Iain De Caestecker as Marty
- Gary Lewis as Keith
- Mabel Strachan as Sophie

== Production ==
=== Development ===
The Twin is an adaptation of the Norwegian series Twin. Sarah Dollard, Hanna Jameson, Scout Cripps, Kam Odedra, and Joy Wilkinson were writers of the series, with Dollard also executive producing. Jeremy Lovering served as executive producer and director of the series. Jamie Dornan is an executive producer. Nira Park and Rachael Prior of Complete Fiction executive produce along with David Flynn and Paul Lee for wiip.

In October, it was announced that the title would be changed from The Undertow to The Twin.

=== Casting ===
Jamie Dornan and Mackenzie Davis leads the series, alongside Iain De Caestecker and Gary Lewis.

=== Filming ===
Filming on the series took place in the Scottish Highlands in May 2024. Other filming locations include the Scottish Islands Sutherland and the Isle of Mull.

== Release ==
The series will be released with six episodes on 1 January 2027.
