= Red Dot (film) =

2021 drama film

- Film poster
- Directed by: Alain Darborg
- Written by: Alain Darborg; Per Dickson
- Starring: Nanna Blondell; Anastasios Soulis; Thomas Hanzon; Johannes Bah Kuhnke; Kalled Mustonen; Tomas Bergström
- Edited by: Magnus Häll
- Music by: Carl-Johan Sevedag
- Distributed by: Netflix
- Release date: February 11, 2021 (Worldwide)
- Running time: 85 minutes
- Country: Sweden
- Languages: Swedish; English

Red Dot is a 2021 Swedish drama thriller film written by Alain Darborg with Per Dickson and directed by Alain Darborg. The film stars Nanna Blondell, Anastasios Soulis, Thomas Hanzon, Johannes Bah Kuhnke, Kalled Mustonen and Tomas Bergström. It premiered on Netflix on February 11, 2021. It was the first Swedish Netflix film.

== Plot ==
After his university graduation ceremony, David (Anastasios Soulis) publicly and awkwardly proposes to his girlfriend, Nadja (Nanna Blondell), which she happily accepts. A year and a half later, however, they are stressed due to work and school and fight frequently in their apartment in Stockholm. The stress is compounded when Nadja learns that she is pregnant, which she is unhappy about as she is studying to be a doctor and she is not sure if she and David should be parents. She decides to keep it a secret from David. Nadja opens up to an older neighbor, Tomas (Thomas Hanzon), and he assures her that she and David will be great parents; he insists that parenthood is life's greatest gift and implies he has lost a child of his own. The next morning, David surprises Nadja with a camping trip to see the northern lights, and the two reconcile and take the trip with their dog, Boris. While stopping for gas, David encounters two locals, brothers Jarmo and Rolle, and is made uncomfortable by their rough mannerisms and their truck bed full of dead game. As he has difficulties taking his car out of park, he accidentally bumps into the brothers' truck, leaving scratches. David chooses to drive off instead of saying something, which annoys Nadja. When they reach their destination at an inn, the woman at the front desk treats them strangely and silently refuses to serve them, leaving her brother Einar to imply that she's not used to seeing an interracial couple. He learns of their itinerary and offers to host them at his cabin in the wilderness. Nadja becomes nervous seeing Jarmo and Rolle in the establishment, and when they leave, they discover that someone has keyed their car and vandalized their bumper sticker with a racial epithet. Angered by this, Nadja spots their pickup truck later on the drive and scratches it with a screwdriver, narrowly avoiding retaliation when the brothers catch her in the act.

The couple camps beneath the northern lights, and Nadja reveals she is pregnant, which makes David nervous and unsure. Their conversation is interrupted when they spot a red dot on the wall of their tent. They first assume that it is a laser pointer prank, but quickly realize that is a laser sight from a rifle and guess that the brothers are attacking them in revenge for the car damage. Boris escapes into the wilderness while they try to hide, and they hear gunshots and the sound of Boris whining. After they are shot at, they flee into the forest and hear their pursuers chase after them. After spending the night hiding in a small shelter, they return to the bloodied campsite and find all their belongings missing, and Boris's severed head in the tent. While searching for any remaining possessions, David is injured when his arm gets caught in a hunting trap. Finding nothing to help them, they set off to find help. However, they are soon shot at again, and David, increasingly losing blood, hallucinates a boy in a winter coat staring at them. David is shot in the shoulder while Nadja escapes unhurt, and the two search for each other as a snowstorm sets in. Nadja realizes that she has run atop a frozen lake, and as David searches for her, he falls in and is narrowly rescued by her. The couple finally makes it to an emergency cabin, where they phone rescuers and are told they will have to wait until the storm passes for help.

The next morning, they hear a vehicle approach the cabin and realize it is an armed (but unaware) Jarmo, who works as a mountain rescuer. Escaping through a back window, they flee into the woods and seek shelter in what is revealed to be the den of a hibernating bear. Jarmo discovers them, but before he can shoot, Nadja shoots him with a flare found at the cabin. David's condition deteriorates as they progress, and he hallucinates the boy again and begins mumbling about guilt. Spotting Einar's cabin in the distance, Nadja runs ahead to get help for David, but encounters Rolle on the way. Rolle seems confused by her appearance, but before he can act, David knocks him unconscious with a rock, and the two make it to Einar's cabin. Einar appears to call for help, but Nadja realizes that he is contacting someone else, and Einar suddenly becomes aggressive and locks them in a room discovered to be covered in stealth photographs taken of the couple.

Finally, Tomas arrives with a rifle, and the truth is revealed: the day of the couple's engagement, Nadja attempted to perform oral sex on David as they drove home, and a distracted David struck and killed a pedestrian -- the boy he had hallucinated earlier, who was also Tomas's son and Einar's nephew. David chose to drive off instead of calling the police as Nadja wanted, which left her wracked with guilt. On that day, Tomas had been playing with a drone with his son, which had caused him to run into the road; however, the drone also captured the couple's license plate, and a grieving Tomas tracked them down and moved into a nearby apartment to surveil them. Tomas is intent on inflicting revenge on the couple for callously driving away and had been behind the earlier murder attempts. He now decides to become more sadistic and tries to get David to use a power drill to torture and kill Nadja's child, and he shoots David in the knee when he does not comply. Tomas prepares to kill them both but is interrupted by the arrival of a furious Jarmo, who has tracked down the couple. In the confusion, Tomas shoots and fatally wounds Jarmo, who accidentally does the same to Einar, and Nadja and David escape while Jarmo and Tomas struggle for a rifle.

Nadja and David attempt to flee, but David cannot escape with his injuries. He tells Nadja to run, and when she stumbles upon the unconscious Rolle, she decides to take his rifle and save David. However, when she returns, she hesitates while trying to shoot him and is shot in the head and killed instantly by Mona, Tomas's wife and Einar's sister encountered earlier at the inn. A traumatized David begs to be killed as well, but Tomas refuses, telling him that he can now understand how he felt after his own son had died. Mona and Tomas depart as David is left sobbing in the snow.

== Cast ==
- Nanna Blondell as Nadja
- Anastasios Soulis as David
- Thomas Hanzon as Tomas
- Johannes Bah Kuhnke as Einar
- Kalled Mustonen as Jarmo
- Tomas Bergström as Rolle

== Production ==
=== Development ===
The film was announced as Netflix Films at the Stockholm Film Festival on November 14, 2019.

== Reception ==
On the review aggregator website Rotten Tomatoes, 70% of ten critics' reviews are positive, with an average rating of 6.00/10.

Red Dot received one out of five stars from Helena Lindblad in Dagens Nyehter. She criticized the film's "utterly stupid and egocentric" main characters.
