= Gry Molvær Hivju =

Norwegian writer and presenter (born 1970)

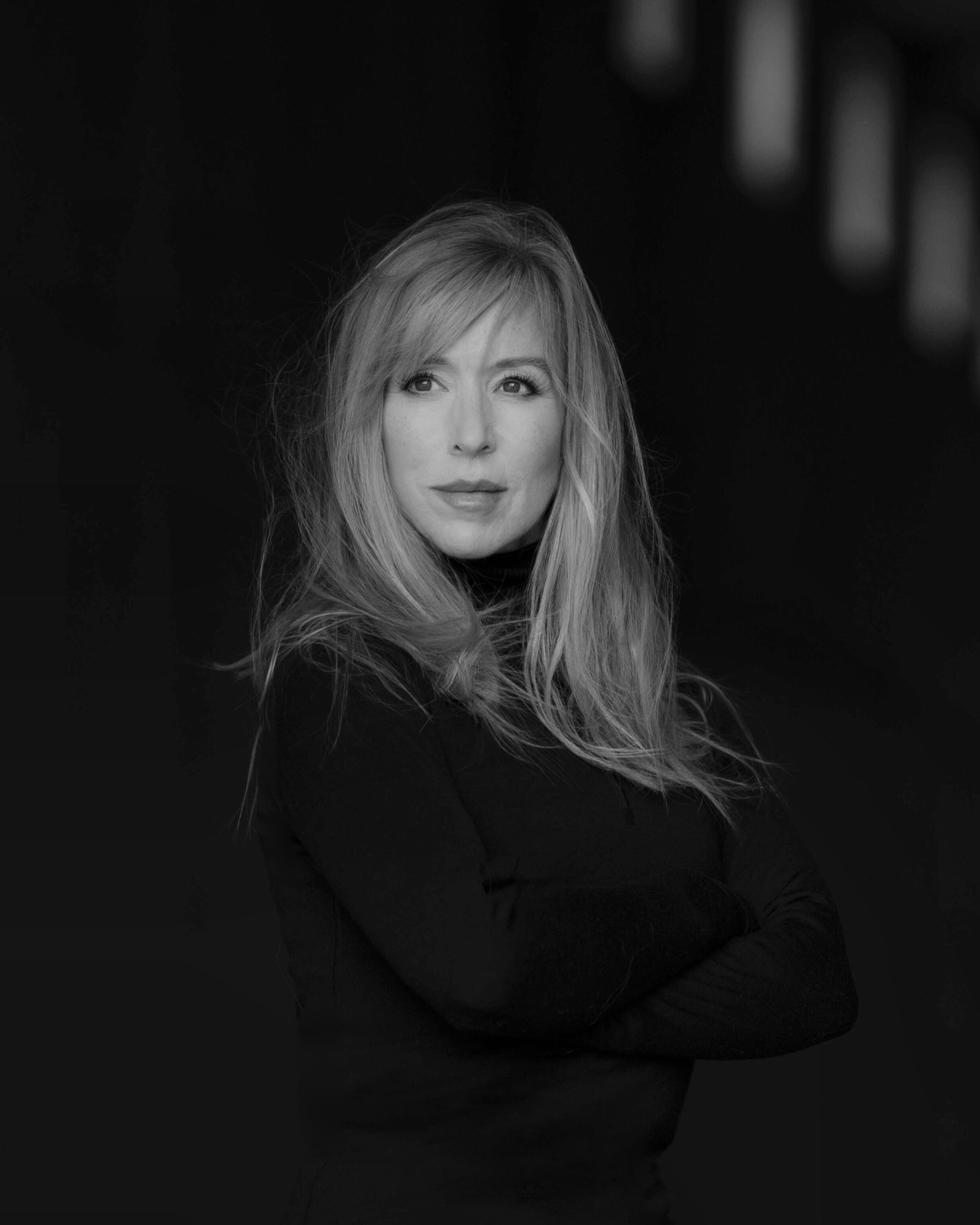
- Photo: Tor Sivertstøl
- Born: Gry Molvær; 16 October 1970 (age 55); Sula, Norway
- Occupations: journalist, director, producer and screenwriter
- Spouse: Kristofer Hivju (m. 2015)
- Children: 2
- Relatives: Erik Hivju (father-in-law)

Gry Molvær Hivju (born 16 October 1970) is a Norwegian TV presenter, director and producer of documentaries, scriptwriter, news journalist, and an artist.

== Biography ==
Gry Molvær Hivju was employed by NRK (Norwegian Broadcasting Corporation) from 1994 to 2014. As a member of NRK, she worked as a program manager and feature reporter in the prime-time science program Schrödingers Cat, focusing on popular science in a diverse topics worldwide. She has multiple year of news experience in radio and TV/WEB in NRK, including roles as a presenter.

Molvær Hivju has a media education from Volda University College, as well as an extension of political science and international politics. In 2012, she was in the first litter of NRK's esteemed 'Masterclass' program, catering to a select group of talented directors and scriptwriters talents. She also has additional education in fine arts from Einar Granum School of Fine Art, and also had several art photo exhibitions in Norway. In addition, she has had the scenography of major performances, such as "From Hat to Hope" in Nidaros Cathedral.

Molvær Hivju has been honoured with the "Kringkastingsprisen" (Norwegian Broadcasting Award), the "Folkeopplysningsprisen" (The Public Enlightenment Award), and multiple language-related accolades for exemplary linguistic prowess and innovative communication.

Her documentary, "Bit Ballerina Bulldog", which is about the art of Karen Bit Vejle, was nominated for Best Documentary of the Year during the Bergen International Film Festival (BIFF) in 2015. The documentary was later nominated for Best Movie Music under Gullruten, the esteemed 'Golden Screen' award within the Norwegian Broadcast Industry. Hivju also participated as one of the artists in the film "Lysleite", which won the Professional Award Best Photo during the Golden Screen' in 2014. The film is produced by Tindefilm, in which Hivju is a part owner.

Molvær Hivju has also spearheaded programs such as "Matsjokket," addressing food waste for NRK1, and co-led "The Hunt for Olav the Holy". Additionally, she was set to lead the groundbreaking series "Ultimate Viking" for the Smithsonian Channel (alongside Kristofer Hivju); however, its launch was postponed due to the global pandemic. Instead, she delivered the high-quality fictional series "Fearless" (Uræd) to NRK1 spring 2022, chronicling the spectacular and dramatic voyage of Ole Brude across the Atlantic Ocean in 1904 aboard one of the world's first covered lifeboats, "Uræd".

In addition Molvær Hivju has led and hosted high-profile international conferences and award ceremonies such as The Kavli Prize 2022 alongside BBC's Jim Al-Khalili. This role was undertaken in collaboration with the Kavli Foundation, The Norwegian Academy of Science and Letters, and The Norwegian Ministry of Education and Research. The awards, recognising outstanding achievements in Astrophysics, Nanoscience, and Neuroscience, are conferred by His Majesty King Harald.

She has also hosted significant conferences such as the 250th annerversary performance to the Royal Norwegian Society of Science and Letters, Norvegian Tecknoport/Tech-Port (SINTEF, NTNU), "EnergiUka" (Innovation Norway, Enova, and the Research Council of Norway), the New Year's Concert with the Oslo Philharmonic Orchestra sponsored by Norsk Hydro, debates for "Forskningsdagene", The Norwegian Seafood Federation, and delivered lectures, including engagements for XyntioExchange addressing food waste.

She served for eight years as the Jury Leader for the Norwegian Ministry of Culture's Nynorsk Journalist Prize, contributing significantly to the establishment of the "Nynorsk mediesenter" aimed at training young journalists within NRK.

Over the years, Hivju has provided commentary on a number of nature and science documentaries at NRK, including "Our Spectacular Planet" (BBC/NRK) "Continental Growing Up" (NRK / BBC), "Animal Super Senses" (NRK / BBC) and "Haiane's enigmatic life" (NRK / BBC). She has also been used as a script consultant on various productions and for the Amanda Award-nominated documentary "The Silver of the Sea", as well as writing texts for the artist Ørnulf Opdahl's book "Over the Atlantic Ridge" ("Deeper Than Light"). In 2017, Hivju directed "Harnessing the Wind", a commercial film about wind power for the company Aker Solutions.

== Documentaries ==
Hivju has participated in the following documentary film projects as director, screenwriter and / or commentator:

- Docufiction Fearless /«Uræd», 2022
- The ship that conquered the Sea/ «Bankskøyta», 2016
- Bit Ballerina Bulldog, 2015
- Herdalshuldra, 2013
- The Gold Treasure at Runde/ Rundeskatten, 2011
- The Sea Kingdom/ Havlandet, 2006
- Light born in Darknes / Lys født i mørke (short film), 1998
- Bachelors/ Ungkarar i Sande (short film), 1997

== Personal life ==
Hivju is from the island of Sula på Sunnmøre. She is married to Kristofer Hivju. Together they have two daughters, Noor (born in 2008) and Sylja (born in 2009).
