= Anastasios Soulis =

Swedish actor (born 1987)

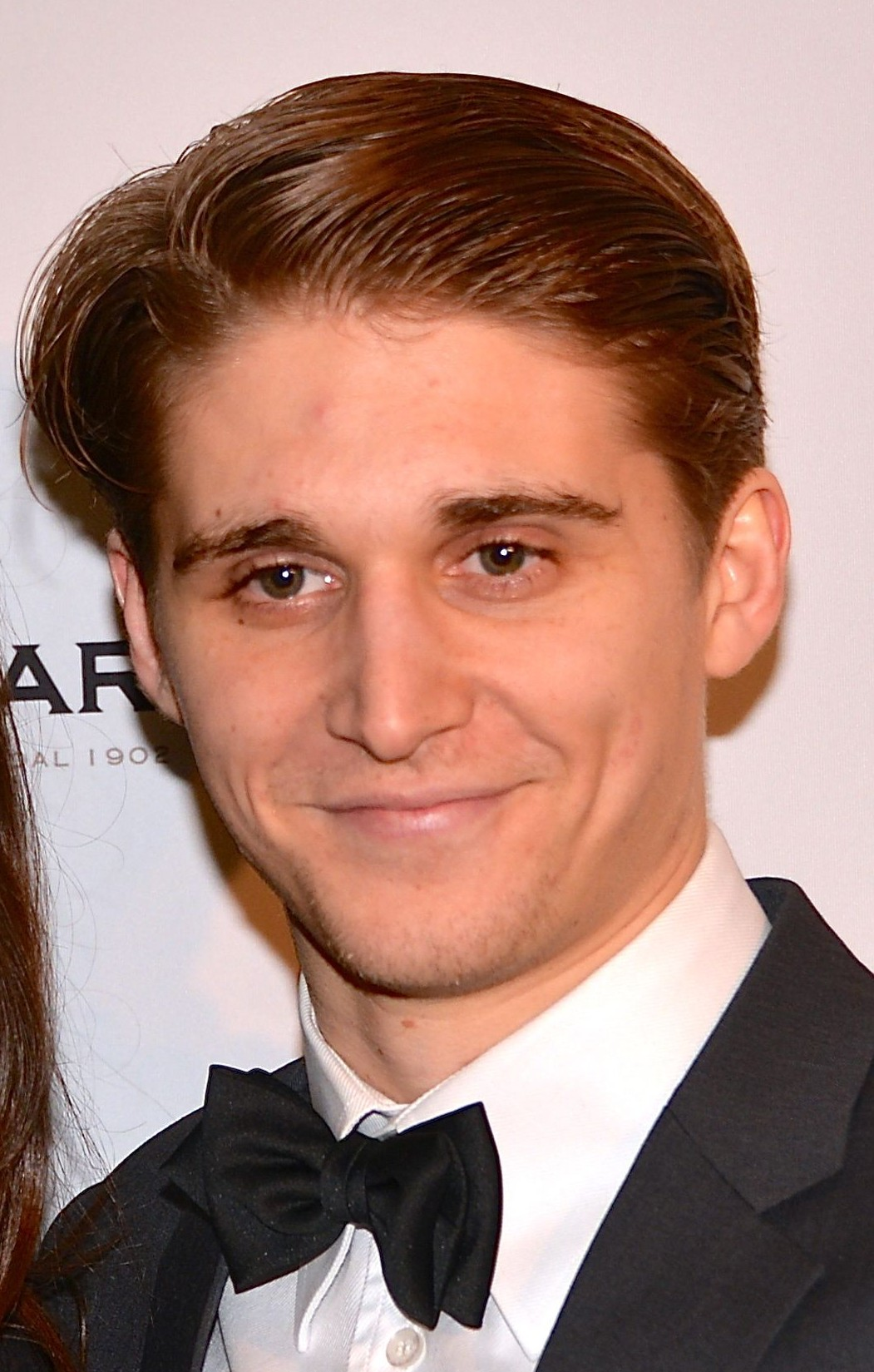
- Anastasios Soulis in 2013
- Born: 8 January 1987 (age 38); Stockholm, Sweden
- Occupation: Actor
- Years active: 2000–present

Anastasios Soulis (born 8 January 1987) is a Swedish actor. He was born to a Greek father, Georgios Soulis and a Finnish mother, Katariina Nerg.

== Selected filmography ==
- 2000 - Den bästa sommaren
- 2001 - Hem ljuva hem
- 2001 - Gryningsland
- 2002 - Alla älskar Alice
- 2002 - Det brinner!
- 2003 - Emma och Daniel: Mötet
- 2004 - Tre solar
- 2006 - Underbara älskade
- 2007 - Beck – Det tysta skriket
- 2008 - Les Grandes Personnes
- 2009 - Prinsessa
- 2009 - De halvt dolda (TV)
- 2009 - Bröllopsfotografen
- 2009 - Johan Falk – Gruppen för särskilda insatser
- 2009 - Johan Falk – Vapenbröder
- 2009 - Johan Falk – National Target
- 2010 - Maria Wern - Alla de stillsamma döda (TV)
- 2012 - Johan Falk – Spelets regler
- 2012 - Johan Falk – De 107 Patrioterna
- 2012 - Johan Falk – Alla råns moder
- 2012 - Johan Falk – Organizatsija Karayan
- 2012 - Johan Falk – Barninfiltratören
- 2013 - Rendez-vous à Kiruna
- 2013 - Crimes of Passion
- 2015 - En underbar jävla jul
- 2018 - Lykkeland (State of Happiness)
- 2020, 2022 – The Machinery (TV)
- 2021 - Red Dot
