= Daf Palfrey =

Welsh director, producer and writer

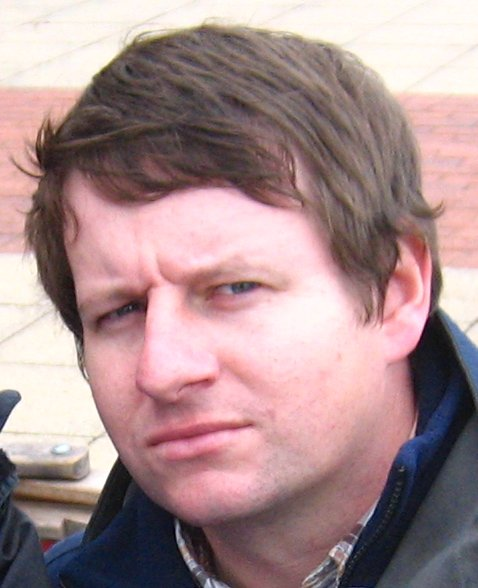
Daf Palfrey

Dafydd (Daf) Palfrey (born 26 March 1973) is a Welsh director, producer and writer.

== Education ==
He received 1st Class BA Hons Graphic Design at Camberwell College of Arts London Institute. His other interests include writing and performing music, which he has done semi-professionally since he was 16, as a lead guitarist with legendary Cardiff funk band Hanner Pei. He has written a pilot for a TV series, directed numerous prime time shows, shot over thirty music videos and worked in the UK and abroad, including the US, Puerto Rico, Berlin, Patagonia and Canada.

Palfrey graduated in 1997 from Camberwell College of Arts with a 1st class degree in Graphic Design. One of his graduation projects was a short film starring Rhys Ifans, which was a surrealist interpretation of the events leading up to "The Scream" by Edvard Munch.

He worked in Puerto Rico for a few months on a documentary about photographer Jack Delano. He directed music videos for a short time in London and Wales before moving to Bristol to work in TV and film. Credits include Historyonics for BBC One, Eating Words, music videos for Super Furry Animals and DJ Yoda. To date, he has directed over 30 music videos, about 7 short films and a number of TV programmes. Some of those films he produced with his film production company "Ten Pence".

== Credits ==
- 2016, Director, "Fear Thy Neighbor" for Investigation Discovery
- 2016, Director, "Murder U" 3 Episodes for Investigation Discovery
- 2013, Director, Casualty Red Button Special "Scars and Nightmares" for BBC
- 2012, Director, Gwaith/Cartref ("Homework") Series 3. 4 × 1 hour episodes for S4C – Episodes 2 to 5
- 2011, Director, Sombreros Mini drama series for S4C. 3 × 1 hour episodes. Filmed in UK and Mallorca, Spain.
- 2010, Director, Gwaith/Cartref ("Homework") Series 1. 7 hours of drama for S4C – Episodes 1 to 5 and 9 & 10
- 2010, Director, 40" commercial for Western Power Distribution through Greenfield Media
- 2009, Director, Crash, shown on BBC1 Series 2, Episode 4, 5 and 6 (final episodes)
- 2008, Director, DIY SOS Compilation, shown on BBC1 on 7 January 2009
- 2008, Director, Free Running, advertisement for UWIC
- 2007 Writer-Director, "Poncho Mamgu" S4C/Tracrecord
- 2006, Director, BBC (Bristol) DIY SOS. He directed 7 half-hour comedy based lifestyle programmes, averaging at 4.5 million viewers. A challenging mix of observational documentary, scripted comedy sequences and stylish design related elements.
- 2006, Producer-Director, Ten Pence Ltd. DJ Yoda goes to the movies 2, DJ Yoda's second "Movies" set committed to DVD. Includes a special 45-minute performance in Greenwich Park on the influences of Quentin Tarantino. Palfrey shot this entire DVD himself, and assembled it with the help of two editors and a multimedia company.
- 2006, Director, Opus/S4C Cowbois ac Injans, 2 × 1 hour eight-part Comedy Drama series situated in a second-hand car dealership in the backwaters of West Wales. The series is a mix of drama, comedy and action which centres on the relationship between two rival salesmen and their chaotic lives.
- 2006, Producer/Director, Ten Pence Ltd. DJ Yoda goes to the movies. He produced and directed a DVD of DJ Yoda's "Movies" set at the Curzon Soho in London. With the use of a DVD deck, two mixers, two turntables and a laptop, Yoda bombards the audience with clips from films, ranging from Star Wars to lesser known B-movies like "The Class of Nuke 'em High". He is able to 'scratch' these films, as you would a record. All this with a hip hop sound track.
- 2006, Director, Boomerang Bandit Videos, Music videos shot on a mixture of Super16mm film and Digi Beta.
- 2005, Director, Boomerang Bandit Videos, Entertaining music videos with mini budgets. "Dyn Telesales" by Mattoids voted best video of 2005 by members of http://maes-e.com
- 2005, Director, Teledu Apollo "Teledu Eddie", Half-hour comedy for young viewers. A group of bizarre characters are stranded in the jungle as part of a cruel TV experiment, a bit like I'm a Celebrity... Get Me Out of Here!, but more anarchic.

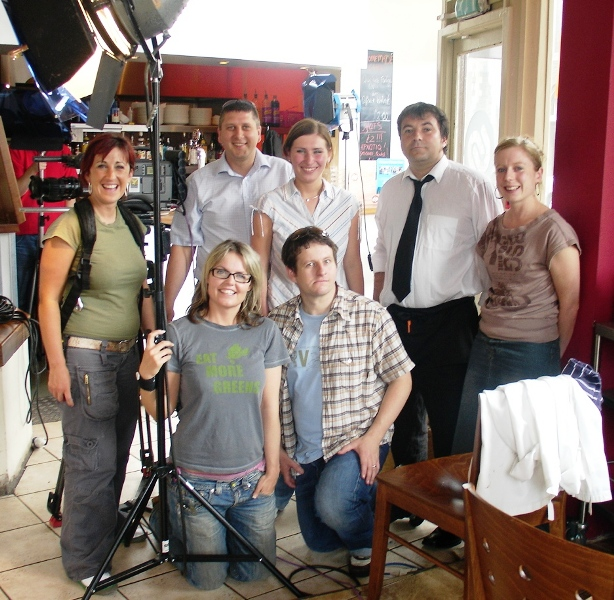
With the crew and actors during the making of Bwyta Geiriau, from left at the back: Cheryl Jones (sound), Stan Zurek (actor), Ewa Rawińska (actress), Jams Thomas (actor), Llinos Griffin (film maker), kneeling: Lynfa Jenkins (DOP) and Daf Palfrey (director)

- 2005, Director, S4C, Bwyta Geiriau ("Eating Words"). Short comic drama on the enlargement of the European Union and its cultural impact on the UK. Nominated for Prix Europa 2005. Iona Jones (Director of Programming S4C) said about this film: "Bwyta Geiriau" typifies the creative excellence S4C aims for in all its output, with its unconventional, humorous take on the pan European issue of multilingualism.
- 2005, Director, Apollo "Teledu Eddie" ("Eddie TV"), Half-hour comedy for young audience. Spoof on the "Holiday Swap" format.
- 2004, Producer/Director, Ten Pence Limited, "Off the Lip" Aspects, Music video for Aspects, (Antidote/Sanctuary Records) summer surfing hip-hop anthem. Regular play on MTV2 and picked as a "Hot New One" on the NME Chart Show.
- 2004, Writer/Director, Calling The Shots "Self Help For Your Nerves", Short film. Jane, a stressed-out mother of two, is confronted by a pernicious new age pedant in her introductory meditation class. BBC Three's "Late Night Shorts" Presented by Tim Roth.
- 2004, Director, "With A Little Help From My Friends" – Vinnie Jones, Footballer and movie star Vinnie Jones builds a football club house with old school friends. He's only got five days in which to do it and no money. 1 hour. Transmitted at 6pm ITV1, Saturday evening. Jamie Theakston presents.
- 2004, Director, "Boomerang i-DotDot", Documentary/entertainment. Behind the scenes of live studio show. Featured spoof dockumentary on resident band "The Perverts"

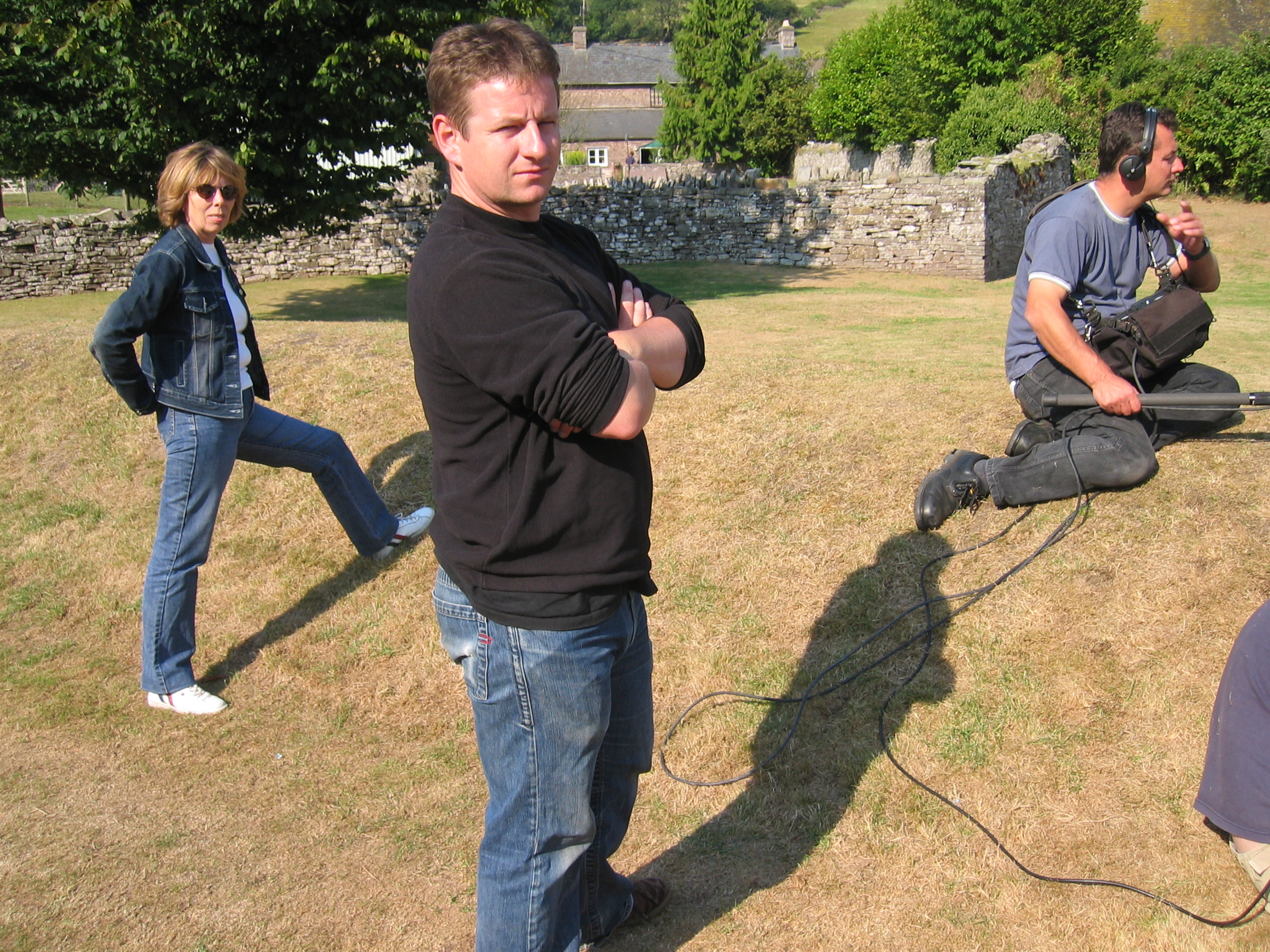
During the making of Historyonics

- 2003, Director, BBC1, "Historyonics" (Mary Queen of Scots). The plot that led to Mary's execution. Script input and direction. Written and presented by Nick Knowles. Produced by Annie Heather.
- 2003, Director, BBC1, "Historyonics" (1066), Comedy drama that builds up to the famous Battle of Hastings. Written and presented by Nick Knowles. The series was also shown on History Channel International.
- 2003, Director, BBC1, "Historyonics" (Richard III). Uncovers the truth about Richard III of England and the rumours surrounding the murder of his nephews. Produced by Mark Bristow. Music by Louis Prima
- 2002, Director, BBC, "Home Front in the Garden", Diarmuid Gavin's ambitious design programme. 1950s influenced garden with a hundred white rabbits let loose. Self-shot majority with DSR 500 over period of 3 weeks
- 2002, Director, "Talkback Britain's Best Homes", Channel 4's national search for Britain's best homes
- 2002, Director, HBO/Life Network/Living Canada, "90 Days in Hollywood", 13-part observational documentary series about the agonies of a group of desperate young actors as they endure a series of debilitating rejections during Hollywood's notorious Pilot Season. Series Producer: Jonny Clothier
- 2002, Director, Tiger Aspect, "Funny You Should Ask", Featured on the street experiments on passers by and science-based comedy sketches and short films. Transmitted on Discovery during its 'Comedy Science' night
- 2001, Director, Tiger Aspect, "Toilets", Two half-hour films on the social history of the toilet. Presented by Claudia Winkleman for BBC Choice. "A Design For Life" and "Weird Sh*t"
- 2001, Series Director, HTV Refresh, Co-devised (with director Richard Knew) absurd Saturday youth magazine series, designed for people with hangovers
- 2001, Producer/Director, HTV Textured Lives, "Your Song", Pilot for prime-time documentary series. Bringing to life significant musical moments in people's lives through dramatic reconstruction and interviews
- 2000, Director, Boomerang Garej, (see below)
- 1999, Director, Boom Boom Mancini, "Super Model Human", Music Video for Almo Sound signed band
- 1999, Producer/Director, Boomerang Garej, Music videos, shot on 16 mm film and Digi Beta for up-and-coming bands. Half-hour show included interviews, profiles and music-related items
- 1998, Director, Super Furry Animals, "Ice Hockey Hair", Video for the title track from the bands EP. Featured on 'The Chart Show', MTV and TOTP. Reached number 12 in charts. Available on new compilation DVD – Super Furry Animals – "SONGBOOK"
- 1997, Writer/Director, Paradiso Films (Puerto Rico), "Portrait of a Journey: Jack Delano", Palfrey wrote and co-directed his first half-hour film for the Smithsonian Institution in Puerto Rico. The project was shown across South America and USA as part of a travelling retrospective on photographer and composer Jack Delano

== Industry Awards ==
- 2004 – Winner of the RTS West of England, Best Network Drama/Drama Documentary
- 2005 – "Eating Words" nominated for Prix Europa "My Europe" spot
- 2006 – "Eating Words" Shortlisted for Celtic Film Festival
- 2009 – "Strap-On Owl Beak" Winner of Best Short Comedy Drama at End of The Pier International Film Festival
- 2009 – "Strap-On Owl Beak" Winner of Best Sound Design at End of The Pier International Film Festival
