= Twin (TV series) =

Norwegian television crime drama series

- Genre: Crime drama
- Created by: Kristoffer Metcalfe
- Written by: Kristoffer Metcalfe; Anne Elvedal; Vegard Steiro Amundsen; Sofia Lersol Lund
- Directed by: Kristoffer Metcalfe; Erika Calmeyer
- Starring: Kristofer Hivju; Rebekka Nystabakk; Mathilde Holtedahl Cuhra; Gunnar Eiriksson; Nanna Blondell; Kingsford Siayor
- Composer: Martin Horntveth
- Country of origin: Norway
- Original language: Norwegian
- No. of seasons: 1
- No. of episodes: 8

Production
- Executive producers: Aage Aaberge; Vegard Eriksen Stenberg; Tomas Radoor; Henrik Zein
- Producer: Sigurd Mikal Karoliussen
- Running time: 44 minutes (approx.)
- Production company: Nordisk Film

Original release
- Network: NRK
- Release: October 27, 2019 – present

Twin is a Norwegian television crime drama series that premiered on 27 October 2019 on the government-owned, public broadcaster NRK. The series was created, written and directed by Kristoffer Metcalfe and stars Kristofer Hivju as Erik and Adam. The series debuted at the Series Mania festival in Lille in March 2019.

== Synopsis ==
Erik and Adam are identical twins, living completely different lives. Erik is a broke surfer bum, Adam a successful family and businessman. When Erik seeks out his brother for the first time in 15 years, a quarrel ends with Adam’s wife, Ingrid, believing she's accidentally killed Adam. Erik loses Adam from a boat on the way to the emergency room at the local hospital, and Adam actually dies from drowning (as revealed later by an autopsy). To avoid being arrested for accidental murder and to save his brother’s family, Erik takes over Adam’s identity, strongly encouraged by Ingrid, who is monitoring the events, without much thought of her and Adam's two children. Erik's biggest challenge is not avoiding getting caught, but pretending to be someone he is not.

== Cast ==
- Kristofer Hivju as Adam and Erik
- Rebekka Nystabakk as Ingrid Williksen
- Mathilde Holtedahl Cuhra as Karin Williksen
- Gunnar Eiriksson as Frank
- Nanna Blondell as Mary
- Vebjørn Enger as Young Erik
- Sigrid Erdal as Young Ingrid
- Ellen Birgitte Winther as Margrete
- Kingsford Siayor as Sander
- Øyvind Samuel Palerud as Fredrik Wiliksen
- John Sigurd Kristensen as Alfred Wiliksen
- Sigurd Kornelius Lakseide as Glenn
- Sara Daldorff Kanck as Vilde
- Marlon Langeland as Lukas
- Ingri Arthur as Sara
- Kim Sørensen as Thomas
- Trude-Sofie Anthonsen as Johanne
- Torstein Bjørklund as Henrik
- Fanny Bjørn as Mille
- Milla Fischer-Yndestad as Tone
- Aslag Guttormsgaard as Jakob
- Rebekka Robinson Gynge as Grete
- Trond Halbo as Undertaker
- Svein Harry Hauge as Hugo
- Ingrid Jerstad as Josefine
- John Emil Jørgensrud as Trond
- Tom Krane as Jesper 2
- Jan Olav Larssen as Boat Neighbor
- Hæge Manheim as Viktor’s wife
- Lena Meieran as Randi
- Torunn Meyer as Employee #1
- Franklin Mukadi as Jesper
- Camilla Steine Munk as Mother
- Øyvind Rørtveit as Roger
- Ragna Schwenke as Edel
- Maja Skogstad as Janet
- Kaveh Tehrani as Doctor
- Jason Turner as Journalist
- Bjørn Isak Winther as Little boy

== Adaptation ==
In March 2024, Netflix gave the series order of The Undertow based on the original series, starring Jamie Dornan and Mackenzie Davis.

In October 2026, the series was retitled as The Twin, which is set to premiere on 1 January 2027.
