= Kristofer Hivju =

Norwegian actor

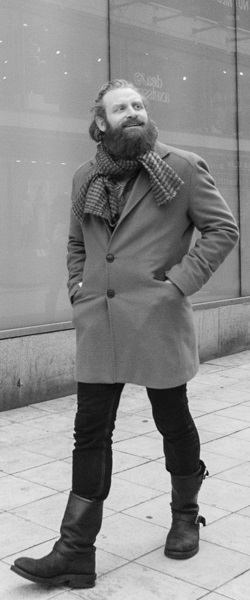
- Hivju in 2015
- Born: 7 December 1978 (age 47); Oslo, Norway
- Occupation: Actor
- Years active: 2001–present
- Spouse: Gry Molvær Hivju (m. 2015)
- Children: 2
- Parent(s): Erik Hivju; Lieselotte Holmene
- Relatives: Isabelle Nanty (cousin)

Kristofer Hivju (Norwegian: [krɪˈstɔ̀fːər ˈhɪ̂vjʉː]; born 7 December 1978) is a Norwegian actor. He is most notable for playing the role of Tormund Giantsbane in Game of Thrones (2013-2019).

His other credits include Manhunt (2008), The Thing (2011), After Earth (2013), Force Majeure (2014), The Fate of the Furious (2017), Twin, Downhill (2020), The Witcher (2021), The Gentlemen (2024), Twilight of the Gods (2024) (voice), The Iris Affair (2025) and In the Grey (2026).

== Early life ==
Hivju was born in Oslo, Norway. He graduated from the Danish subdivision of the Russian Academy of Theatre Arts (GITIS) in 2004.

== Career ==
He began of his career and starred in the television series, such as Fox Grønland and Seks som oss, in the avalanche drama film Manhunt (2008), and plays at the Grusomhetens Teater and Trøndelag Teater, as well as written scripts for the short films Closework (2005), and Flax (2008).

In several instances, he portrays Viking King Olav II in Norwegian-produced documentary film Olav, and also appeared in From Hate to Hope. He starred in the remake of the science fiction classic The Thing (2011).

From 2013, Hivju played the role of Wildling Tormund Giantsbane in 33 episodes of the HBO fantasy series Game of Thrones (2013-2019). His first appearance was in the first episode of the third season, "Valar Dohaeris". In 2013, he also appeared in M. Night Shyamalan's science fiction film After Earth (2013).

Hivju appearred in the movie Force Majeure (2014), and starred as Connor Rhodes in the film The Fate of the Furious (2017).

In 2019, he played a double role as Erik and Adam in the Norwegian television crime drama series Twin, and followed up starring in the skiing remake film Downhill (2020). In 2021 he starred as Nivellen, alongside Henry Cavill in a single episode of The Witcher (2021).

In 2023, he began appearing in a series of commercials for Scotts brand products as Scott the Scottsman, pushing the product and encouraging homeowners to keep their lawn green. He played Florian de Groot in two episodes of Guy Ritchie's The Gentlemen (2024), and the same year was the voice of Andvari in Twilight of the Gods (2024).

In 2025, he starred as Jensen Lind, alongside Niamh Algar and Tom Hollander in the Sky Atlantic thriller series The Iris Affair (2025).

== Personal life ==
Hivju is the son of Norwegian actors Erik Hivju and Lieselotte Holmene and is the cousin of French actress Isabelle Nanty. He is married to Gry Molvær Hivju. Together they have two daughters, Noor (born in 2007) and Sylja (born in 2008).

== Filmography ==
=== Film ===
Year	Title	Role	Director(s)	Notes
2008	Manhunt	Man 2 / Man in Café	Patrik Syversen	
2011	The Thing	Jonas	Matthijs van Heijningen, Jr.	
2013	After Earth	Security Chief	M. Night Shyamalan	
2014	In Order of Disappearance	Stig Erik "Strike" Smith	Hans Petter Moland	
2014	Force Majeure	Mats	Ruben Östlund	
2014	Operation Arctic	Fangstmann	Grethe Bøe-Waal	
2014	Verden venter		Mariken Halle	
2015	The Wendy Effect	Percy	Ole Endresen	
2016	The Last King	Torstein Skevla	Nils Gaup	
2017	The Fate of the Furious	Connor Rhodes	F. Gary Gray	
2020	Downhill	Michel	Nat Faxon; Jim Rash	
2021	Three Wishes for Cinderella	Hestepasseren	Cecilie Mosli	
2023	Cocaine Bear	Olaf Kristoffer	Elizabeth Banks	
2023	Last Ride	Øyvind	Cinqué Lee	
2024	Long Distance	Dwayne	Will Speck; Josh Gordon	
2024	Red One	Krampus	Jake Kasdan	
2025	Afterburn	General Volkov	J.J. Perry	
2026	In the Grey	Axel Oloffson	Guy Ritchie	

=== Television ===
Year	Title	Role	Notes
2001	Fox Grønland	Jim Olsen	2 episodes
2006	Melonas	TBA	
2007	Six Like Us	Bar Customer	1 episode
2007	Largest of All	Ben	6 episodes
2013	The Games	Expert Commentator	1 episode
2013–2019	Game of Thrones	Tormund Giantsbane	33 episodes
2014	Lilyhammer	Tormod	1 episode
2016–present	Beck	Steinar Hovland	13 episodes
2017	The Lion Guard	Kenge (voice)	1 episode
2019	Twin	Adam & Erik	8 episodes
2020	DuckTales	Jormungandr (voice)	1 episode
2021	The Witcher	Nivellen	Episode: "A Grain of Truth"
2024	The Gentlemen	Florian de Groot	2 episodes
2024	Twilight of the Gods	Andvari (voice)	6 episodes
2025	The Iris Affair	Jensen Lind	4 episodes

=== Shorts and documentaries ===
Year	Title	Role	Director	Notes
2005	Closework	Pleieren (Nurse/Hygienist)	Kristoffer Metcalfe	Short
2007	Kilolirakis	N/A	N/A	Short
2008	En perfekt dag for golf	Gudmund the Paramedic	Eric Magnusson	English title: A Perfect Day for Golf; Short
2008	Scratch	Torpedo	Bård Ivar Engelsås	English title: Flax; Writing Credit; Short
2011	Min Siste Bull	Victim	Onur Genc	Short
2011	Din Tur	Eik	Vegard Dahle	English title: Your Turn; Short
2011	Olav	Olaf II of Norway	N/A	Documentary
2013	Haikeren	Torgeir	Anders Teig	Short
2014	Its OK	The Hipster	Kristoffer Metcalfe	Short
TBA	TWIN	The Twin	Kristoffer Metcalfe	Short
TBA	Olav	Himself	N/A	Documentary TV series
