= Buried =

Buried may refer to:

== Television episodes ==
- "Buried" (Breaking Bad)
- "Buried" (Fear the Walking Dead)
- "Buried" (Law & Order: UK)
- "Buried" (Prison Break)

== Other uses ==
- Buried (performance art), artwork by Abel Azcona
- Buried (film), a 2010 thriller film
- Buried (TV series), a 2003 British drama series
- "Buried" (Brandy Clark song), 2023 track on Brandy Clark
- Buried: The Last Witness, 2024 BBC Radio 4 podcast
- Buried with Michael Sheen, 2026 documentary, a follow-on to Buried: The Last Witness

== See also ==
- Burial (disambiguation)
- Bury (disambiguation)
