= HTW =

HTW may refer to:

- Hartwood railway station, in Scotland
- Healing the Wounds, a British charity
- Hear the World Foundation, a Swiss non-profit foundation
- Hindu Temple of Wisconsin, a temple in Pewaukee, Wisconsin, United States
- Hochschule für Technik und Wirtschaft Berlin, a university of applied sciences in Berlin, Germany
- htw saar, a university of applied sciences in Saarbrücken, Germany
- Lawrence County Airpark, in Ohio, United States
