= FC United (disambiguation) =

FC United may refer to:

- F.C. United of Manchester, a semi-professional Association football club based in Moston, Manchester, England
- FC United of Wrexham, an amateur Association football and futsal club based in Wrexham, Wales
- FC United Zürich, an Association football club based in Zürich, Switzerland
- FC United (Jakobstad), a women's Association football club from Jakobstad, Finland
