= United FC =

United FC, United F.C., F.C. United, or United Football Club may refer to

- United F.C. (The Bahamas), an association football club in Nassau
- United F.C. (South Africa), an association football club in Kimberley
- United Football Club (Dubai), an association football club
- United Football Club, an Australian rules football team in Long Plains, South Australia, in the Adelaide Plains Football League
- FC United (Jakobstad), a women's association football club in Finland
- F.C. United of Manchester, a semi-professional association football club in Moston, Manchester, England (not to be confused with the professional club Manchester United F.C.)
- FC United of Wrexham, an amateur association football and futsal club in Wales (not to be confused with the professional club Wrexham A.F.C.)
- Chicago FC United, commonly called FC United, a soccer club in the U.S.
