= Sky burial (disambiguation) =

A sky burial is a Tibetan open-air excarnation funerary practice.

Sky burial may also refer to:

- Dakhma, a Zoroastrian open-air excarnation funerary practice
- Space burial, a space-age funerary practice involving launching cremated remains into space
- Sky Burial, a 2004 novel by Xue Xinran
- "Sky Burial" (song), by Ash
- "Sky Burial" (Doctors), a 2005 television episode

== See also ==
- Burial (disambiguation)
