= Water burial =

Water burial may refer to:

- Burial at sea
- Alkaline hydrolysis (body disposal)
- Scattering cremated remains in a natural body of water

== See also ==
- Burial (disambiguation)
