= Teresa Melo =

Portuguese mathematician (born 1966)

Maria Teresa Rocha de Magalhães Melo (born 1966) is a Portuguese mathematician and operations researcher who works as a professor in the business school of the Saarland University of Applied Sciences (htw saar), a Fachhochschule in Saarbrücken, Germany. Her research interests include facility location, supply chain management, and in-hospital patient transport.

== Education and career ==
Melo was born in 1966 in Lisbon, and studied applied mathematics at the University of Lisbon, graduating in 1989 and earning a master's degree there in statistics and operations research in 1991. Next, she went to the Econometric Institute of Erasmus University Rotterdam for doctoral study, completing a PhD in operations research in 1996 with a dissertation concerning the economic lot scheduling problem.

She took postdoctoral research positions at the Forschungszentrum Jülich and Fraunhofer Institute for Industrial Mathematics in 1997 and 1999 respectively, and became an invited lecturer at the Technical University of Kaiserslautern in 2000. She moved to htw saar as an associate professor in 2007, and became a full professor in 2011. At htw saar, she is also founding co-director of the Institute for Supply Chain and Operations Management.
