= Nye (play) =

2024 play about Aneurin Bevan

- Original National Theatre production poster
- Original language: English
- Written by: Tim Price
- Based on: The life of Aneurin Bevan
- Genre: Drama

Premiere
- Date: 6 March 2024
- Place: Olivier Theatre, National Theatre, London

Nye is a play by Tim Price about the life of Aneurin 'Nye' Bevan, founder of the National Health Service.

== Production history ==
The play made its world premiere in the Olivier Theatre at the National Theatre, London beginning previews from 24 February (with a press night of 6 March) running until 11 May 2024, starring Michael Sheen in the title role and directed by Rufus Norris. It was a co-production with Wales Millennium Centre, Cardiff where it transferred from 18 May to 1 June.

As part of Norris's final season announcement as director of the National Theatre, it was announced that the play would be revived with Sheen reprising the role of Nye in the Olivier Theatre beginning previews from 3 July (with a press night on 10 July) to 16 August 2025, before transferring again to the Wales Millennium Centre from 22 to 30 August.

== Live broadcast ==
On 23 April 2024, the play was the 100th title to be broadcast live to cinemas across the world through National Theatre Live. On 7 November 2024, the recording was broadcast for free on YouTube.

== Showcase ==
Nye is available to stream free of charge as an educational resource for UK state schools and FE colleges through the National Theatre Collection.

In October 2025, the pyjamas designed for Nye Bevan in the play were auctioned off to raise funds for the children in Gaza war.

== Reception ==
=== Critical response ===
Andrew Marr, writing in the New Statesman, praised Sheen's remarkable ability to transition "from stuttering schoolboy (the Bevan stutter is superbly realised) to irresistible lover; wily political manipulator to tormented, dying patient at extraordinary speed, without missing a footstep". The minimalist stage design requires Sheen to completely own the stage, with the rest of the actors reduced to background decorations. The play necessarily omits many important events in Bevan’s life in order to effectively make a profound commentary on the need for the NHS, and the director Rufus Norris and the playwright Tim Price pulled off a "well-explained" and moving portrayal of Bevan's legacy instead of a mere tale of hero worship.

Arifa Akbar from The Guardian described Nye as "a vital play because Bevan is a vital man of British history. It succeeds in showing us just how high the hurdles he faced were", noting Sheen as "well cast for his natural charm" and that his portrayal of Bevan "brings a curious fey playfulness and vulnerability", but critiquing the production for being "too full, yet too simplified" in its narrative approach. In her review for The Observer, theatre critic Susannah Clapp described Nye as a "fevered dream", highlighting the use of hallucinations and flashbacks to recount Bevan's life and the founding of the NHS. While Sheen's performance is praised as "fiery but not indulgent, putting across the power of the man and his purring, self-mocking humour", the production is critiqued for being overly didactic and lacking dramatic depth.

=== Accolades ===
Award	Date of ceremony	Category	Recipient	Result	Source
WhatsOnStage Awards	9 February 2025	Best Performer in a Play	Michael Sheen	Nominated	
WhatsOnStage Awards	9 February 2025	Best Supporting Performer in a Play	Sharon Small	Nominated	
