= Tim Price (writer) =

Welsh screenwriter and playwright

- Occupations: Screenwriter, Playwright
- Known for: The Radicalisation of Bradley Manning; Y Pris; Switch; Doctor Who

Tim Price is a Welsh screenwriter and playwright. He created the Welsh crime drama Y Pris, which ran for two series on S4C, and the fantasy series Switch.

== Career ==
Price worked as a journalist and designer on weekly newspapers, like the Pontypridd Observer.

Price's stage plays include Salt, Root and Roe (nominated for an Olivier Award for Outstanding Achievement in an affiliate theatre), about two sisters who make a suicide pact, I'm With the Band, about an indie band, and his commission for the second season of the National Theatre Wales tour, The Radicalisation of Bradley Manning (winner of the James Tait Black Award best play). He also wrote the biographical play Praxis Makes Perfect, about Italian communist Giangiacomo Feltrinelli. He has had work performed at the Barbican, Traverse Theatre, Pentabus Theatre and the Royal Court. In 2024, the National Theatre will stage Nye, Price's biographical play about Nye Bevan.

Price has written extensively for television, including popular series such as River City, Casualty, Secret Diary of a Call Girl and The New Worst Witch. He wrote for the Sky1 firefighting drama The Smoke, and would work again with star Jodie Whittaker on the eleventh series of Doctor Who. He was involved in the writers room of the series, contributing ideas, but had to bow out due to other commitments. He was credited for creating the alien Pting for the fifth episode, "The Tsuranga Conundrum" (ultimately written by showrunner Chris Chibnall).

He has also written the 2019 feature comedy How to Fake a War, starring Jay Pharoah, and the 2024 play Nye for the Royal National Theatre/Wales Millennium Centre, starring Michael Sheen as Nye Bevan.

== Teaching ==
He joined the Centre for New Writing in 2015 and teaches on the University of Manchester Screenwriting MA.
