= Ysgol Bro Pedr =

Location
- Peterwell Terrace; Lampeter, Ceredigion, SA48 7BX; Wales
- Coordinates: 52°06′40″N 4°04′57″W

Information
- Type: Comprehensive
- Motto: A fo ben bid bont (If you want to be a leader, be a bridge)
- Local authority: Ceredigion
- Head teacher: Carys Morgan
- Gender: Mixed
- Age: 3 to 19
- Enrolment: 1011 (2022)
- Language: Bilingual (Type B)
- Publication: Llais Pedr
- Website: www.bropedr.ceredigion.sch.uk

Ysgol Bro Pedr is a mixed middle school for pupils aged 3–19. The school is situated in Lampeter, Ceredigion, Wales. The school is a product of the amalgamation of Ysgol Gynradd Ffynonbedr primary school and Ysgol Gyfun Llanbedr Pont Steffan secondary school.

The school is categorized linguistically by Welsh Government as a category 2B school, meaning that at least 80% of subjects (except Welsh and English) are taught through the medium of Welsh but are also taught through the medium of English. 37% of pupils came from Welsh-speaking homes in 2016.

== Notable former pupils ==
- Rhodri Gomer-Davies, rugby union player
- Ben Lake, Plaid Cymru politician
- Elin Jones, Plaid Cymru politician and Llywydd of the Senedd
- Gillian Elisa, actress
