= Michael Sheen =

Welsh actor and presenter (born 1969)

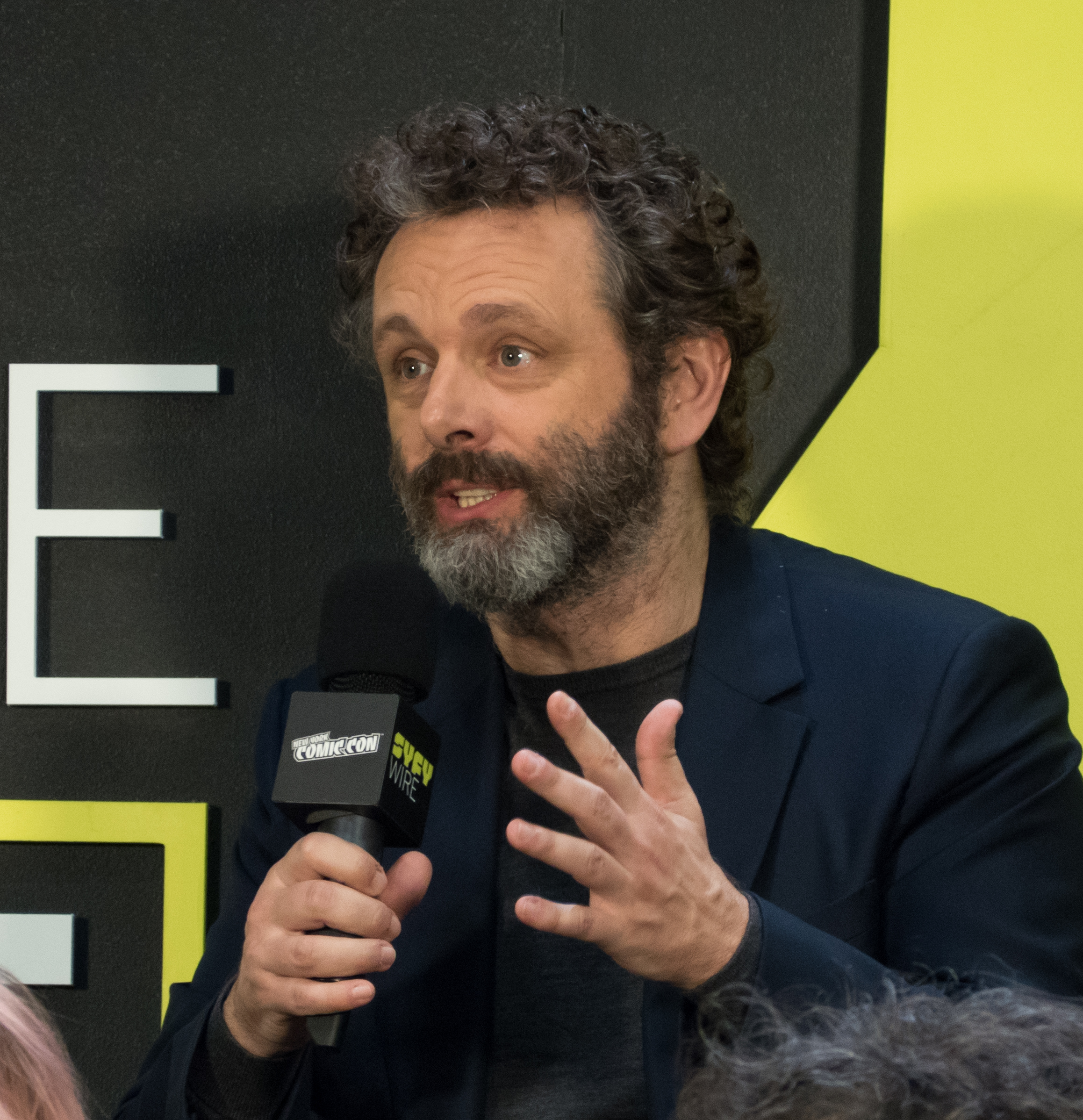
- Sheen in 2018
- Born: Michael Christopher Sheen; 5 February 1969 (age 57); Newport, Wales
- Education: Royal Academy of Dramatic Art
- Occupations: Actor and presenter
- Years active: 1991–present
- Partners: Kate Beckinsale (1995–2003); Lorraine Stewart (2004–2010); Rachel McAdams (2010–2013); Sarah Silverman (2014–2018); Anna Lundberg (2019–present)
- Children: 3
- Sheen's voice recorded December 2018

Michael Christopher Sheen (born 5 February 1969) is a Welsh actor and presenter. After training at London's Royal Academy of Dramatic Art (RADA), he worked mainly in theatre throughout the 1990s with stage roles in Romeo and Juliet (1992), Don't Fool with Love (1993), Peer Gynt (1994), The Seagull (1995), The Homecoming (1997), and Henry V (1997). He received Olivier Awards nominations for his performances in Amadeus (1998) at the Old Vic, Look Back in Anger (1999) at the National Theatre and Caligula (2003) at the Donmar Warehouse.

In the 2000s Sheen began screen acting, and he has since made a number of biographical films. For writer Peter Morgan, he starred in three films as British prime minister Sir Tony Blair—the television film The Deal in 2003, The Queen (2006), and The Special Relationship (2010)—earning him nominations for both a BAFTA Award and an Emmy. He was also nominated for a BAFTA as the troubled comic actor Kenneth Williams in BBC Four's 2006 Fantabulosa!, and was nominated for a fourth Olivier Award in 2006 for portraying the broadcaster David Frost in Frost/Nixon, a role he revisited in the 2008 film adaptation of the play. He starred as the controversial football manager Brian Clough in The Damned United (2009).

Since 2009, Sheen has had a wider variety of roles. In 2009, he appeared in two fantasy films, Underworld: Rise of the Lycans and The Twilight Saga: New Moon, and in 2010, he made a four-episode guest appearance in the NBC comedy 30 Rock. He appeared in the science-fiction film Tron: Legacy (2010) and Woody Allen's romantic comedy Midnight in Paris (2011). He directed and starred in National Theatre Wales' The Passion. From late 2011 until early 2012, he played the title role in Hamlet at the Young Vic. He played a lead role in The Twilight Saga: Breaking Dawn – Part 2 in 2012. In 2013, he received a Golden Globe nomination for his role in Showtime's television drama Masters of Sex.

Sheen played an incarcerated serial killer surgeon in Fox's drama series Prodigal Son (2019–2021), Aziraphale in the BBC/Amazon Studios fantasy comedy series Good Omens (2019–2026), and appeared as Chris Tarrant in Quiz (2020). He played himself in the quarantine comedy show Staged (2020–2022) with his friend and Good Omens co-star David Tennant throughout the COVID-19 lockdown. Sheen is known for his political and social activism, and renounced his OBE in 2017.

== Early life and education ==
Michael Christopher Sheen was born on 5 February 1969 in Newport, Wales, the son of Irene, a secretary, and Meyrick, a British Steel Corporation personnel manager. His family name, Sheen, is an Irish surname that is derived from his great-great-great grandfather Edward Sheehan, who lived in Waterford, Ireland, before moving to Wales in 1850 with his wife, Catherine Hickey. Sheen has one younger sister, Joanne. The family had been living in Llanmartin for seven years prior to his birth. When he was five, the family moved to Wallasey for work, but settled in his parents' home town of Port Talbot, Glamorgan, three years later.

A keen footballer, Sheen was scouted and offered a place on Arsenal's youth team at the age of 12, but his family was unwilling to relocate to London. He later said he was grateful for his parents' decision, as the chances of forging a professional football career were slight.

Sheen was raised in a theatrical family; his parents were both involved in local amateur operatics and musicals, and, later in life, his father worked as a part-time professional Jack Nicholson lookalike, which took him across the world and as an after-dinner speaker. In his teenage years, Sheen was involved with the West Glamorgan Youth Theatre and, later, the National Youth Theatre of Wales. He was influenced by the performances of Laurence Olivier and the writings of theatre critic Kenneth Tynan.

In 1984, at the age of 15, Sheen, along with his friend Charles Uzzell-Edwards and Charles' father John Uzzell Edwards, helped salvage the iron and steel gate leading to the terrace of Dylan Thomas Boathouse in Laugharne; they discovered it stuck in the mud below the boathouse during a walk and dug it out. The gate was kept in the Uzzell-Edwards family garden before Charles auctioned it off at a 2014 event marking the 100th anniversary of Thomas's birth.

Sheen was educated at Blaenbaglan Primary School, Glan Afan Comprehensive School, and then Neath Port Talbot College, where he sat A-levels in English, drama, and sociology.

He considered studying English at university but instead decided to attend drama school. He moved to London in 1988 to train as an actor at the Royal Academy of Dramatic Art (RADA), having spent the previous year working in a Welsh fast-food restaurant called Burger Master to earn money. Sheen was granted the Laurence Olivier Bursary by the Society of London Theatre in his second year at RADA. He graduated in 1991 with a BA in Acting.

== Career ==
=== Classical stage roles (1991–2001) ===
Sheen worked predominantly in theatre in the 1990s and has since remarked that he will always feel "slightly more at home" on stage. "It's more of an actor's medium. You are your own editor, nobody else is choosing what is being seen of you." His first professional role, while still in his third and final year at RADA, was in When She Danced at the Globe Theatre in 1991. He later described the role as "a big break. One day, I was at RADA doing a movement class, the next I was at a read-through with Vanessa Redgrave and Frances de la Tour." Milton Shulman of the Evening Standard praised an "excellent" performance while The Observer wrote of "a notable West End debut". In 1992, Sheen's performance in Romeo and Juliet at the Royal Exchange received a MEN Theatre Award nomination and led theatre critic Michael Coveney to declare him "the most exciting young actor of his generation ... a volatile, electrifying and technically fearless performer". His 1993 turn as Perdican in Alfred de Musset's Don't Fool With Love at the Donmar Warehouse was nominated for the Ian Charleson Award. and was described by The Independent as "quite thrilling". Also in 1993, Sheen appeared in the world premiere of Harold Pinter's Moonlight at the Almeida Theatre and made his television debut in the 1993 BBC mini-series Gallowglass.

Sheen played the title role in Peer Gynt in 1994. The Yukio Ninagawa production was staged in Oslo, Tokyo and at the Barbican Centre, London. The Times praised Sheen's "astonishing vitality" while The Independent found him "sensationally good" and noted that "the Norwegian press were grudgingly captivated by the mercurial Welsh boyo". In other 1994 work, Sheen appeared in Le Livre de Spencer at the Odéon-Théâtre de l'Europe, Paris and starred in the cross-dressing farce Charley's Aunt at the Royal Exchange. In 1995, he appeared opposite Kate Beckinsale in a production of The Seagull at the Theatre Royal, Bath and, with the encouragement of Thelma Holt, directed and starred in The Dresser at the Theatre Royal, Plymouth. In addition, Sheen made his film debut that year, appearing opposite Kenneth Branagh in Othello. 1996 saw Sheen at the National Theatre for The Ends of the Earth, an original play by David Lan. A minor role in Mary Reilly marked the first of three film collaborations with director Stephen Frears. Sheen's most significant appearance of 1997 was the title role in Henry V, staged by the Royal Shakespeare Company (RSC) at their Stratford-upon-Avon theatre, which earned him a second Ian Charleson Award nomination. The Times praised "a blisteringly intelligent performance". Also in 1997, he appeared in a revival of Harold Pinter's The Homecoming at the National Theatre, directed by Roger Michell, and directed Badfinger, starring Rhys Ifans, at the Donmar Warehouse. The latter was staged by the Thin Language Theatre Company, which Sheen had co-founded in 1991, aiming to further Welsh theatre. He then appeared in the biographical film Wilde, playing Robbie Ross to Stephen Fry's Oscar Wilde. In early 1998 Sheen formed a production company, The Foundry, with Helen McCrory and Robert Delamere to promote the work of emerging playwrights, and produced In a Little World of Our Own at the Donmar Warehouse, which gave Colin Farrell his West End debut.

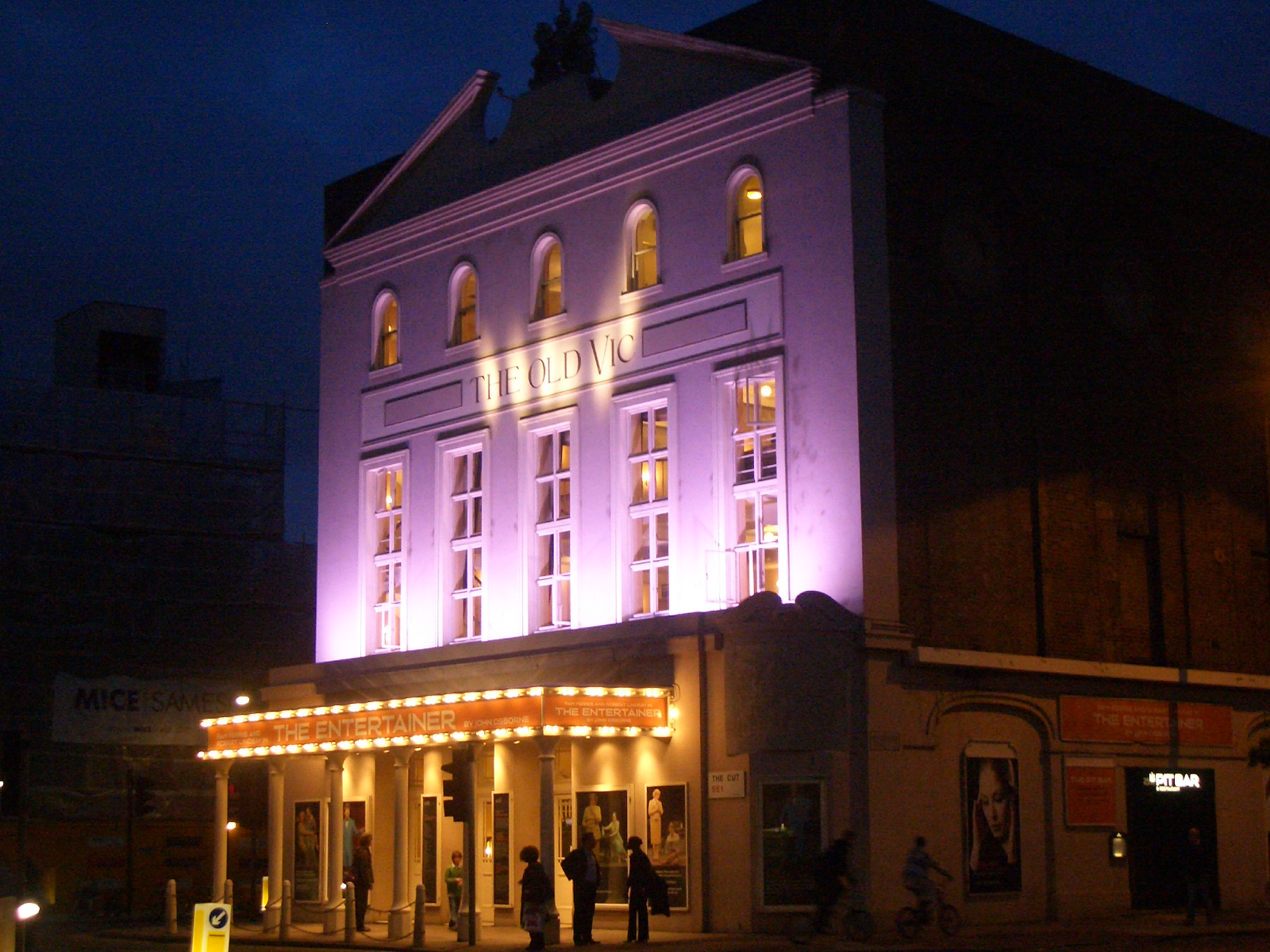
The Old Vic, where Sheen starred in a successful revival of Amadeus in 1998. The play later transferred to Broadway.

From 1998 to 1999, Sheen starred as Mozart in a successful revival of Amadeus. The Peter Hall-directed production was staged at the Old Vic, London, and later transferred to the Music Box on Broadway. Ben Brantley, chief theatre critic for The New York Times, was particularly vocal in his praise. He noted that "Mr. Sheen elicits a real poetry from the role" and felt that, while watching him, "you start to appreciate the derivation of the term star. This actor is so luminous it's scary!" The Independent found him "quite stunning as Mozart. His fantastically physical performance convinces you of his character's genius and the play catches fire whenever he's on stage." Sheen was nominated for a Laurence Olivier Award for Best Supporting Performance and an Outer Critics Circle Award for Outstanding Actor. In 1999, Sheen explored the role of Jimmy Porter in the National Theatre's production of Look Back in Anger. In 2003, Sheen described the production as "the most enjoyable thing I've ever done ... everything came together". "Sheen has cornered the market in explosive energy", said The Independent, "but this thrilling performance is his finest yet." The Financial Times noted: "As Jimmy Porter, a role of staggering difficulty in every way, Michael Sheen gives surely the best performance London has yet seen from him ... You hang on every word he utters ... This is a dazzlingly through-the-body performance." He was nominated for a Laurence Olivier Award for Best Actor and an Evening Standard Award for Best Actor.

=== The Deal, The Queen, and Fantabulosa (2002–2006) ===
At this point in his career, Sheen began to devote more time to film work. Heartlands, a little-seen 2002 film about a naive man's road trip in the Midlands, was his first leading film role. While The Guardian dismissed the "cloying bittersweet-regional-lottery-Britfilm", it noted that "Sheen himself has a childlike, Frank Spencer-ish charm". "It was great to do something that was so different," Sheen has said of the role. "I usually play very extreme characters." Also in 2002, he had a minor role in the action-adventure film The Four Feathers. In 2003, Sheen appeared in Bright Young Things, the directorial debut of his Wilde co-star, Stephen Fry. An adaptation of Evelyn Waugh's novel Vile Bodies, the film followed high society partygoers in decadent, pre-war London. Sheen played a gay aristocrat in an ensemble cast which included James McAvoy, Emily Mortimer, David Tennant, Dan Aykroyd, Jim Broadbent and Peter O'Toole. While the Los Angeles Times said he "shone", The Guardian felt the role "drastically under-uses his talents". Sheen described his character as "possibly the campest man in cinema history" and relished a scene "where I do drugs with [a then 95-year-old] Sir John Mills." In other 2003 film work, Sheen portrayed the werewolf leader Lucian in Underworld and made a brief appearance in the sci-fi film Timeline.

Sheen returned to the stage in 2003 to play the title role in Caligula at the Donmar Warehouse, directed by Michael Grandage. It was the first of just three stage appearances during the 2000s; his young daughter was now based in Los Angeles which made more frequent stage runs in Britain impractical. The Independent's critic declared it "one of the most thrilling and searching performances I have ever witnessed" and The Daily Telegraph described him as an "outrageously charismatic actor" with "an astonishing physical presence". The Times praised a "riveting performance" and The Guardian found him "highly impressive ... at one point he attacks his court poet with a single hair-raising leap across a chair and table". Sheen won an Evening Standard Award for Best Actor and a Critics' Circle Theatre Award for Best Actor, and was again nominated for a Laurence Olivier Award for Best Actor.

Sheen's breakthrough role was as British politician Tony Blair in 2003's The Deal. The Channel 4 film explored the so-called Granita pact made by Tony Blair and Gordon Brown prior to the 1994 Labour Party leadership election, and was the actor's first collaboration with screenwriter Peter Morgan. Director Stephen Frears cast him because "he was in Mary Reilly and I knew he was brilliant." Filmed while he was playing Caligula nightly on stage, Sheen has remarked, "It's interesting that in searching for monsters to play, you often end up playing leaders." The Daily Telegraph praised his "earnest, yet steely, portrayal" while The Guardian found him "excellent. This is intelligent and honest casting." In 2004, Sheen starred in ITV's Dirty Filthy Love, a comic film about a man dealing with OCD and Tourette's after a marital separation. Sheen spoke of "treading a fine line" because "a lot of the symptoms are intrinsically comical". He was nominated for a BAFTA Award for Best Television Actor and a RTS Best Actor Award. Also in 2004, Sheen played a pompous rock star in the romantic comedy Laws of Attraction and produced and starred in The Banker, which won a BAFTA Award for Best Short Film.

In 2005, Sheen starred in the National Theatre's production of The UN Inspector, a David Farr adaptation of The Government Inspector. The Times wrote of "a scathingly brilliant and inventive performance" while Variety noted that the actor "adds comic finesse to his apparently ceaseless repertoire". The Evening Standard, while conceding that the performance was "technically brilliant", expressed bemusement as to why "one of the most mercurial and inspiring actors we have seems set on impersonating Rik Mayall throughout". Also that year, Sheen took part in the Old Vic's 24 Hour Play, in which The Daily Telegraph felt he "dazzled". In 2005 film work, Sheen starred in Dead Long Enough, a small-budget Welsh/Irish film, with his longtime friend, Jason Hughes. In addition, he had a supporting role in Ridley Scott's Kingdom of Heaven, made a cameo appearance in The League of Gentlemen's Apocalypse and starred in the short film The Open Doors.

Sheen came to international attention in 2006 for his portrayal of Tony Blair in The Queen. The film focused on the differing reactions of the British royal family and the newly appointed Prime Minister following the death of Diana, Princess of Wales in 1997; it was Sheen's third collaboration with director Stephen Frears and his second with screenwriter Peter Morgan. He enjoyed reprising his role because Blair, at this point in his career, had "a weight to him that he didn't have before". When asked to discuss his personal opinion of Blair, Sheen admitted that the more time he spent working on the character, the "less opinion" he has of the politician: "Now when I watch him on TV or hear his voice, it's sort of like a cross between a family member, a friend and seeing a really old embarrassing video of yourself." Peter Travers of Rolling Stone praised "a sensational performance, alert and nuanced" while Empire spoke of an "uncanny, insightful performance". Sheen was nominated for a BAFTA Award for Best Actor in a Supporting Role. His second film appearance of 2006 was a supporting role in Blood Diamond as an unscrupulous diamond dealer.

Also in 2006, Sheen starred as the troubled English comic actor Kenneth Williams in BBC Four's Fantabulosa! In preparation for the role, he lost two and a half stone (approx. 35 lbs), studied archival footage and read Williams' published diaries. Sheen has said he is "fascinated by finding the private side of the public face". The Times found his performance "mesmerising" while The Observer described it as "a characterisation for which the description tour-de-force is, frankly, pretty faint praise". He won a RTS Award for Best Actor, and received his second BAFTA nomination of 2006, for Best Television Actor. Sheen starred in two other BBC television productions in 2006, playing H. G. Wells in H. G. Wells: War with the World and Nero in Ancient Rome: The Rise and Fall of an Empire.

=== Frost/Nixon and The Damned United (2007–2009) ===
From 2006 to 2007, Sheen starred as the television broadcaster David Frost in Frost/Nixon at both the Donmar Warehouse and Gielgud Theatre in London and the Jacobs Theatre on Broadway. The play, written by Peter Morgan, directed by Michael Grandage and co-starring Frank Langella, was a critical and commercial success but Sheen initially accepted the role as a favour to his friends and "never thought it was going anywhere". The Guardian said the actor "exactly captures Frost's verbal tics and mannerisms while suggesting a nervousness behind the self-assurance". "He's got the voice, the mannerisms, the blaze," said the Financial Times, "but, more than that, Sheen – as viscerally exciting an actor as any in Britain today – shows us the hunger of Frost's ambition ... and fox-like instinct for the hunt and the kill". Sheen was nominated for a Laurence Olivier Award for Best Actor and a Drama League Award for Distinguished Performance. Sheen next appeared in the 2007 film Music Within as a political activist with cerebral palsy. He spoke of having a "responsibility" to accurately portray the condition. Variety said his performance was "remarkable.. utterly convincing", USA Today found him "outstanding" while the Los Angeles Times felt he was "reminiscent of Daniel Day-Lewis in My Left Foot, bringing a vibrancy and wit to the role". Also that year, Sheen starred in the short film Airlock, or How To Say Goodbye in Space with Derek Jacobi and was invited to join the actors' branch of the Academy of Motion Picture Arts & Sciences.

Sheen reprised the role of David Frost in 2008's Frost/Nixon, a film dramatisation of The Nixon Interviews of 1977. Despite appearing in the original stage production in a part written for him by Peter Morgan, Sheen was surprised to have been cast in the film: "Peter said he'd only be prepared to give the rights to someone who would cast me as Frost, which was very nice, but when the studios get their hands on something... Right up until we started filming I was prepared to be disappointed". Roger Ebert of the Chicago Sun-Times asserted that Sheen embodied his character in a "compelling, intense" performance while The Wall Street Journal felt he was "a brilliant actor" who "grows his character from a bright-eyed social butterfly to a gimlet-eyed interrogator". However, The New York Times felt "the likable, watchable Mr. Sheen has been pitted against a scene-stealer" in Frank Langella's Nixon. Frost himself later said it was "a wonderful performance". Sheen was the recipient of the Variety Award at the British Independent Film Awards 2008., while Langella was nominated for an Academy Award.

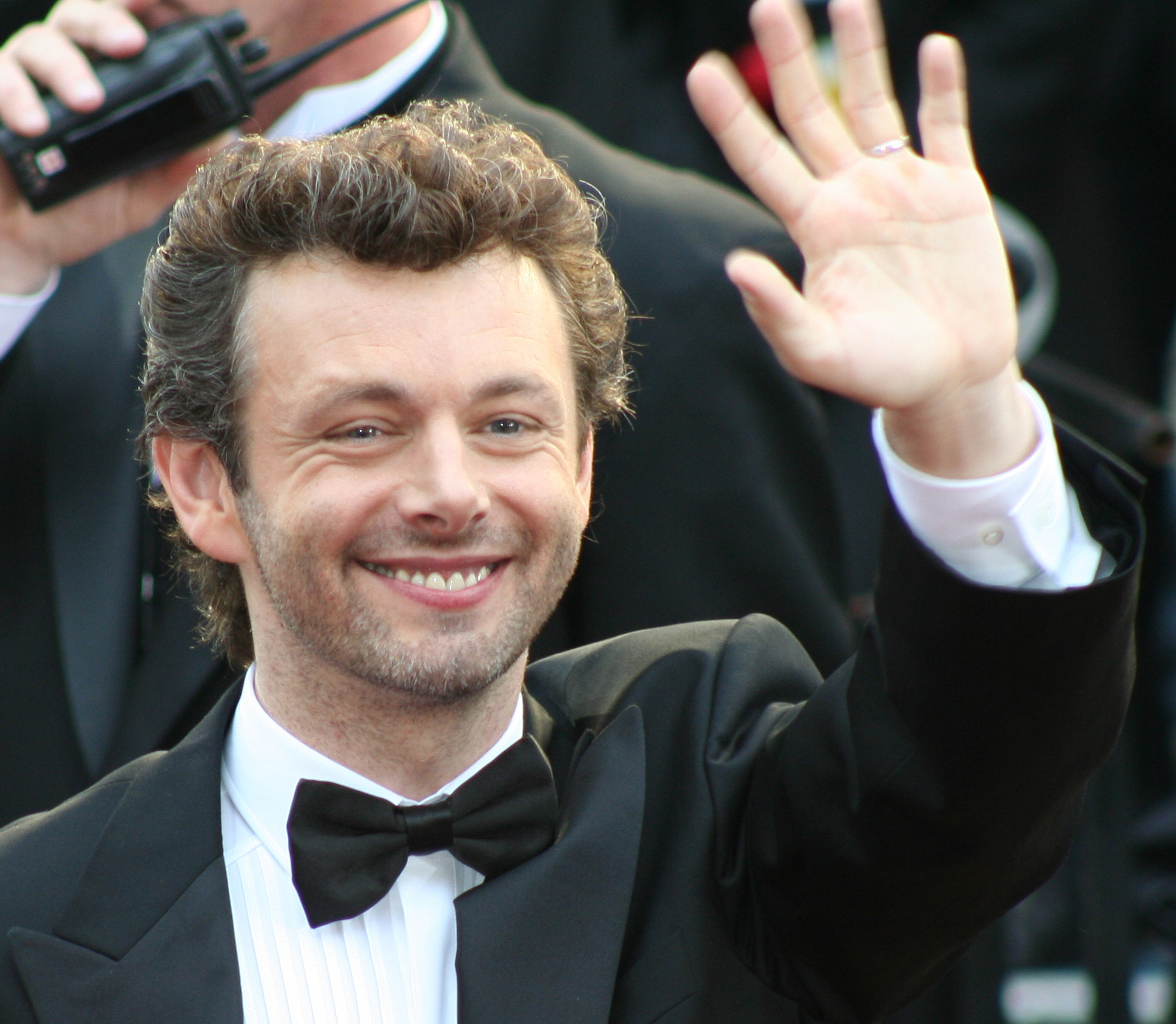
Sheen at the 81st Academy Awards in 2009. He was invited to join the actors' branch of the Academy in 2007.

In 2009, portrayed another public figure; he starred in The Damned United as the outspoken football manager Brian Clough. The Tom Hooper-directed film focused on Clough's disastrous 44-day tenure as manager of Leeds United and marked Sheen's fifth collaboration with writer Peter Morgan. He said Clough is the real-life character he enjoyed playing most. The Guardian, writing in 2009, declared it the "best performance of his big-screen career" while The Times found him "magnificent". Entertainment Weekly asserted that, despite American audiences' unfamiliarity with Clough, "what's lost in translation is recovered easily enough in Michael Sheen's astonishing performance". Variety noted that his "typically scrupulous channelling of Clough gets the tics and mannerisms right, but also carves a moving portrait of a braggart suddenly out of his depth". Also in 2009, Sheen reprised his role as a werewolf in Underworld: Rise of the Lycans, a prequel to the original film. Of his decision to take part, Sheen has said: "My rule of thumb is that I want to do things I'd like to go and see myself." The New York Times felt he was "the movie's greatest asset ... [taking] a lively break from his usual high-crust duties to bring wit, actual acting and some unexpected musculature to the goth-horror flick". Variety said he hit "all the right notes in a star-powered performance that will amuse, if not amaze, anyone who only knows the actor as Tony Blair or David Frost" while Richard Corliss of Time noted that he "tries bravely to keep a straight face".

Sheen had a supporting role in 2009's The Twilight Saga: New Moon, the second film in the highly popular vampire series. In its review, Rolling Stone said: "Late in the film, a real actor, Michael Sheen, shows up as the mind-reading Aro, of the Italian Volturi vampires, and sparks things up. You can almost hear the young cast thinking, 'Is that acting? It looks hard.' So Sheen is quickly ushered out." While The New York Times said he "preens with plausible menace", USA Today felt that he "plays the character with more high-pitched giddiness than menace". He was named Actor of the Year at GQ magazine's annual Men of the Year ceremony. Sheen made two one-off stage appearances in 2009; he performed a scene from Betrayal as part of a Harold Pinter tribute evening at the National Theatre and performed improvisational comedy as part of The Groundlings' Crazy Joe Show in Los Angeles.

=== Hamlet and Masters of Sex (2010–2018) ===
In 2010, Sheen had a supporting role in the science fiction sequel Tron: Legacy. Referring to his David Bowie-esque character, Sheen has said, "I was paid to show off basically". The Wall Street Journal found little fun in the movie "except for a gleefully campy turn by Michael Sheen" while The New York Times said he "shows up to deliver the closest thing to a performance in the movie". The Daily Telegraph felt his "lively hamming as a cane-swishing nightclub owner merely underlines how impersonal—how inhuman—much else here is". However, USA Today felt his "scenery-chewing performance ... is meant as comic relief, but this movie thunders along so seriously that the attempt at humor feels jarring". In other 2010 film work, Sheen voiced Nivens McTwisp, the White Rabbit, in Tim Burton's Alice in Wonderland and Dr. Griffiths in Disney's Tinker Bell and the Great Fairy Rescue and appeared as a terrorist in Unthinkable. On television, Sheen's performance in the third instalment of Peter Morgan's Blair trilogy, The Special Relationship, was nominated for an Emmy Award for Outstanding Lead Actor – Miniseries or Movie. The HBO film examined the "special relationship" between the US and the UK in the political era of Blair and Bill Clinton. It was the sixth collaboration between Sheen and Peter Morgan; both parties have since said they will not work together again "for the foreseeable future". Sheen also made a guest appearance in four episodes of NBC's 30 Rock as Wesley Snipes, a love interest for Tina Fey's Liz Lemon. Fey, the sitcom's star and creator, has said that "he was so funny and delightful to work with". In November 2010, Sheen received the BAFTA Britannia Award for British Artist of the Year.

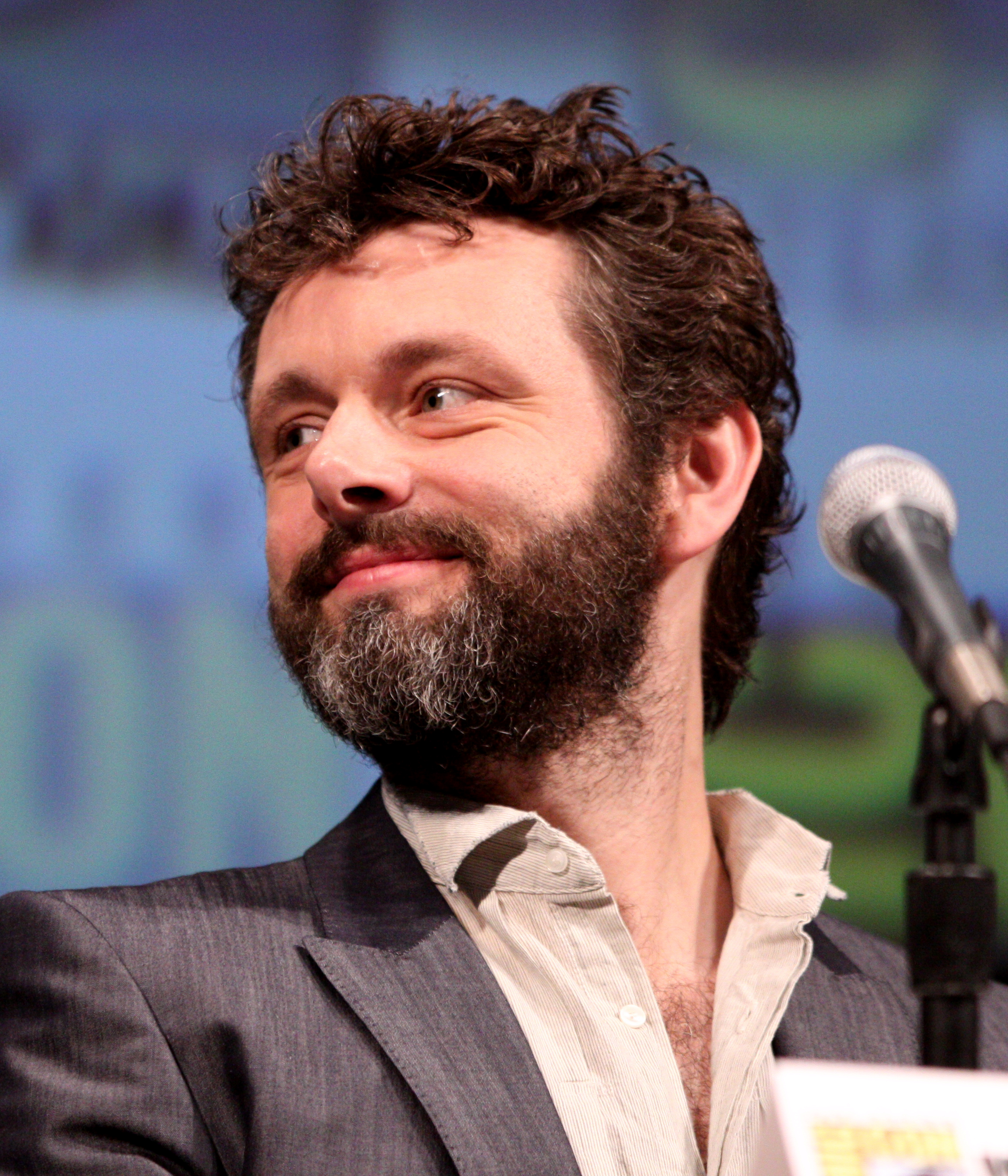
Sheen at the 2010 San Diego Comic-Con

In 2011, Sheen starred in and was creative director of National Theatre Wales's The Passion, a 72-hour secular passion play staged in his hometown of Port Talbot, Wales. In addition to a professional cast, over one thousand local amateurs took part in the performance and as many more volunteers from local charity and community groups were involved in preparations in the months leading up to the play. The event was the subject of both a BBC documentary and The Gospel of Us, a film by director Dave McKean. Sheen has described it as "the most meaningful experience" of his career. The Observer declared it "one of the outstanding theatrical events not only of this year, but of the decade". The Independent's critic described it as "the most extraordinary piece of community-specific theatre I've ever beheld". While The Daily Telegraph bemoaned the large-scale production's logistical problems, "overall I found it touching, transformative and, in its own wayward way, a triumph." The Guardian felt it was "so much more than just an epic piece of street theatre..transforming and uplifting". Sheen and co-director Bill Mitchell were jointly honoured as Best Director at the Theatre Awards UK 2011. In 2013, Sheen won Best Actor at Welsh BAFTA for the production.

Sheen's most notable film appearance of 2011 was a supporting role in Woody Allen's Midnight in Paris. Allen noted that "Michael had to do the pseudo-intellectual, the genuine intellectual, the pedant, and he came in and nailed it from the start". Sheen enjoyed playing "someone who's just absolutely got no sense that he's overstepping the mark or that he's being a bore." The film opened the 2011 Cannes Film Festival and became Allen's highest-grossing film to date. Also in 2011, Sheen starred in Beautiful Boy, an independent drama focusing on the aftermath of a school shooting, voiced the enigmatic and mysterious villain House in the Doctor Who episode "The Doctor's Wife" written by his friend Neil Gaiman and made cameo appearances in The Twilight Saga: Breaking Dawn – Part 1 and Resistance. In 2012 film work, Sheen starred opposite Toni Collette in the independent comedy Jesus Henry Christ and reprised his role as the vampire Aro in the final installment of The Twilight Saga.

Sheen played the title role in Hamlet at the Young Vic in late 2011 and early 2012, a role he first explored in a 1999 BBC Radio 3 production. While there had been tentative plans over the years for both Peter Hall and Michael Grandage to direct Sheen in the play, he eventually asked Ian Rickson. Rickson's production was set in the secure wing of a psychiatric hospital and featured original music by PJ Harvey. The Evening Standard declared Sheen's performance "an audacious achievement" that "will live in the memory" while The Independent praised "a recklessly brilliant and bravura performance." The Daily Telegraph felt that Sheen "could be right up there among the great Hamlets", were it not for Rickson's "mindlessly modish" staging, while The Times found him "unbearably moving". The Guardian described him as "fascinating to watch ... intelligent, inventive and full of insights ... [he] delivers the "What a piece of work is a man" passage with a beautiful consciousness of human potential." The Observer declared him an actor "always worth crossing a principality to see and hear" whose "'To be, or not to be' is a marvel."

In 2013, Sheen appeared in a supporting role as the boyfriend of Tina Fey in the comedy Admission, with Stephanie Zacharek of The Village Voice describing the character as "a whiskery, elfin academic who chuckles to himself as he reads the Canterbury Tales prologue aloud in bed, in Middle English, no less. (Sheen is scarily good at this.)" In 2014, he starred in the fantasy children's film Mariah Mundi and the Midas Box. R. Kurt Osenlund of Slant Magazine said "the ever-versatile Sheen brings an artful hamminess to his role" but Matt Pais of RedEye found him "insufficiently zany" in "a part that Robert Downey Jr. would nail but never accept." His second film role of 2014 was a minor role in the political thriller Kill the Messenger. Also in 2014, he starred in IFC's six-episode The Spoils of Babylon, a television parody of classic, sweeping miniseries, in which he played the husband of Kristen Wiig's character.

In 2015, Sheen starred opposite Carey Mulligan in the romantic drama Far from the Madding Crowd as prosperous bachelor William Boldwood. His performance was well received. Anthony Lane of The New Yorker remarked: "How you prevent such a fellow, crushed by his own decency, from sagging into a bearded Ashley Wilkes is no easy task, yet Sheen succeeds, and Boldwood's brave smile grows dreadful to behold." Ignatiy Vishnevetsky of The A.V. Club found the character "pitiful, and sometimes downright painful to watch. He's not Hardy's Boldwood, but he's a Boldwood. The only sad, genuine moment of the film belongs to him." Peter Bradshaw of The Guardian remarked that Sheen's face "is etched with agony and an awful kind of abject adoration, forever trying to find ways to forgive the loved one in advance for rejection. When Sheen's Boldwood confides to Oak that he feels "grief" you really can feel his pain." Stephanie Zacharek of The Village Voice also referred to the scene where Boldwood expressed his grief, commenting: "Sheen's performance is fine-grained, and the pure Englishness of his understatement is heartrending." Also in 2015, Sheen had well-received comedic television performances in Comedy Bang! Bang!, The Spoils Before Dying and 7 Days in Hell. Mary McNamara of the Los Angeles Times said his television host in 7 Days in Hell was "played with damp lechery and cigarette-ash mastery." Liz Shannon Miller of Indiewire said he may have "stolen the show" while John DeFore of The Hollywood Reporter described him as the "scene-stealer of the bunch".

Sheen presenting the St David Awards, Cardiff in 2015

In February 2015, Sheen joined The Great Comic Relief Bake Off – the charity version of The Great British Bake Off, and won the title "Star Baker" of the episode.

Between 2013 and 2016, Sheen starred in and produced Showtime's Masters of Sex. He and Lizzy Caplan portrayed the 1960s human sexuality pioneers Masters and Johnson; the series chronicled "their unusual lives, romance and pop culture trajectory, which saw them go from a Midwestern teaching hospital to the cover of Time magazine and Johnny Carson's couch". David Sims of The Atlantic described Sheen's portrayal of Masters as "an intensely honest and unsympathetic one" while Sonia Saraiya of The A.V. Club said that Sheen played the role "so seamlessly it's hard to remember that there's a British actor there who has played flamboyant news personalities and prime ministers." Sean T. Collins of The Observer described Masters as "a singularly unappealing figure": "It's not that Michael Sheen is bad in the role. On the contrary! Sheen's skill in playing Masters as an asshole who oscillates between headache-inducing self-repression and volcanic rage renders him unpleasant to spend more than two minutes with at a time." Tim Goodman of The Hollywood Reporter remarked: "Masters has never been very likable. In fact, it's a testament to Sheen's performance— and Caplan's nuanced Johnson offsetting Masters—that anyone still cares what happens to Masters on a personal level." He received a Golden Globe nomination for his performance in late 2013.

In 2016, Sheen had supporting roles in the dramas Nocturnal Animals and Norman, and the science fiction romance Passengers. He also reprised his role as the White Rabbit in the fantasy adventure Alice Through the Looking Glass. Sheen also starred in BBC Wales documentary Michael Sheen: The Fight For My Steel Town and won Welsh BAFTA Award for News and Current Affairs. In 2017, he had supporting roles in the dramatic comedies Brad's Status and Home Again. In 2018, Sheen was cast as unconventional lawyer Roland Blum in season 3 of television series The Good Fight.

=== Good Omens, Staged and Best Interests (2019–2023) ===
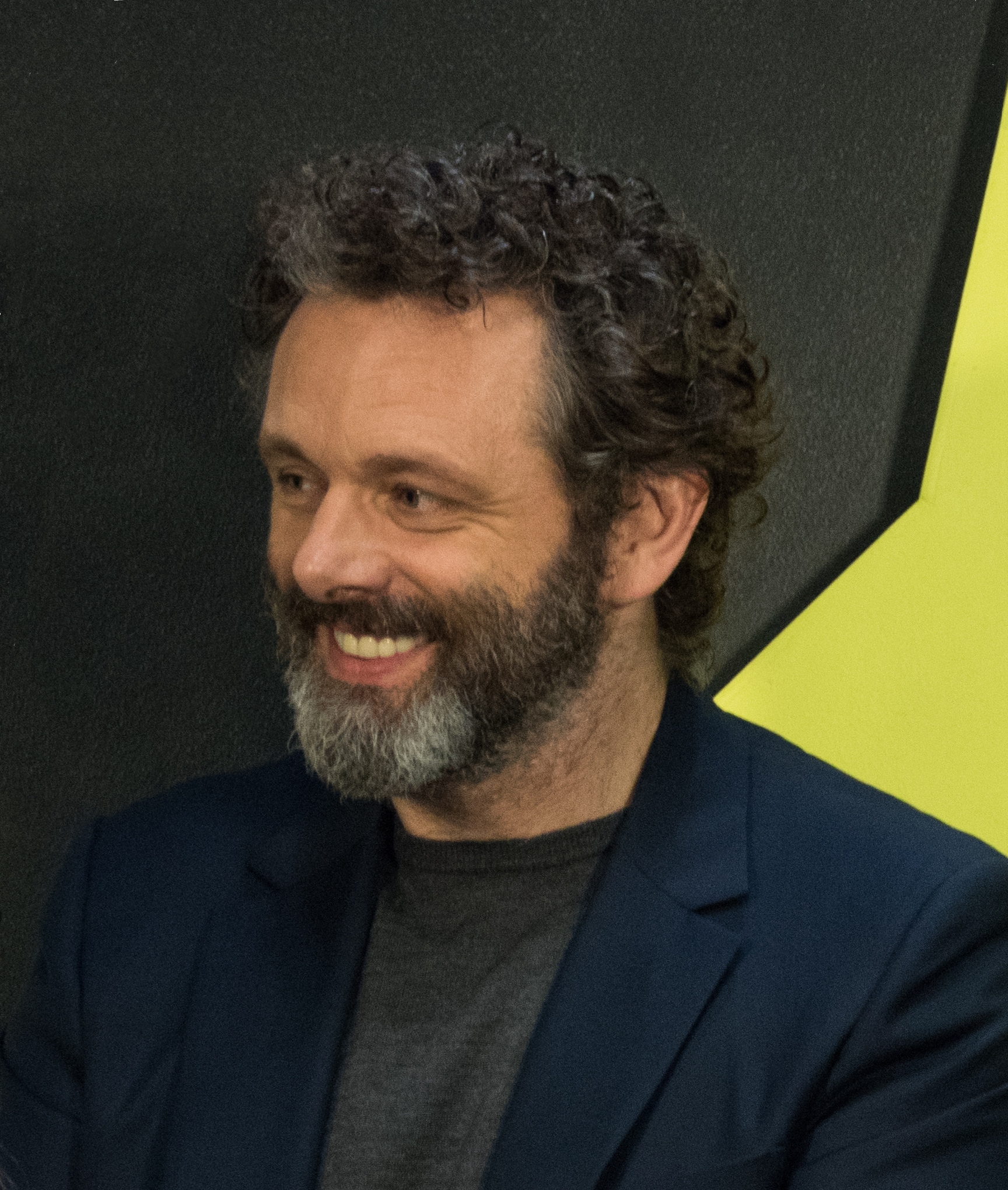
Sheen at the 2018 New York Comic Con

In May 2019, Sheen starred alongside David Tennant in Good Omens, based on the novel of the same name written by Terry Pratchett and Neil Gaiman and was cast as Chris Tarrant in the TV adaptation of James Graham's stage play Quiz. From September 2019 through May 2021, Sheen played the role of Martin Whitly in the American television series Prodigal Son on Fox. In April 2020, Quiz was shown on ITV. On 14 April, when the ITV channel broadcast the second instalment, the continuity announcer introduced him as "Martin Sheen", a different actor. Sheen reacted to this by changing his Twitter handle to "Martin Sheen". In June 2020, Sheen starred alongside David Tennant again in a six-part television lockdown comedy entitled Staged, which was made using video-conferencing software. A second eight-episode series started airing in January 2021. In June 2021, Sheen returned to the London stage, after its protracted period of Covid-19 shutdown, in Dylan Thomas's Under Milk Wood in the Olivier Theatre at the National Theatre. A new production of Amadeus, scheduled for December 2022 at the Sydney Opera House, was announced in July 2022 with Sheen as Salieri. Sheen won Best Performer in a Play at the 2023 BroadwayWorld Australia – Sydney Awards for his performance.

Continuing Sheen's professional partnership with Tennant, a third six-episode series of Staged aired in its entirely on 14 November 2022, while a second six-episode series of Good Omens premiered on 28 July 2023. In June 2023, Sheen starred in BBC One's Best Interests, which won him Best Actor in International Competition at the 2023 Series Mania. In November 2023, Sheen was cast as the former Prince Andrew, Duke of York for a limited series entitled A Very Royal Scandal. Sheen continued his partnership with Tennant in the finale episode for Good Omens, a 90-minute programme which was released on 13 May 2026.

=== The Way, Nye and A Very Royal Scandal (2024–present) ===
From 19 February to 4 March 2024 Sheen directed and starred in a three-part television series called The Way on BBC One and BBC iPlayer. From February to June 2024, Sheen performed on stage as Aneurin Bevan in Nye, a play written by Tim Price and directed by Rufus Norris. The play ran in the Royal National Theatre from 24 February until 11 May, and at the Wales Millennium Centre from 18 May to 1 June. Sheen was nominated for Best Performer in a Play at the 2025 WhatsOnStage Awards for this role. Following a sell-out run in 2024, Sheen reprised his role as Aneurin Bevan in the play Nye in 2025. The second run was at the Royal National Theatre from 3 July to 16 August 2025, and at the Wales Millennium Centre from 22 to 30 August 2025.

In April 2024, Sheen guested on BBC's The Assembly for Autism Acceptance Week, and was praised for his "heartwarming" interaction with neurodivergent journalists. Sheen answering a question from journalist Leo was nominated for TV Moment of the Year at the Edinburgh TV Festival Awards. The Assembly half-hour special with Sheen won Media Moment at the 2025 Scope Awards.

In June 2024, Sheen joined the BBC Radio 4's environmental documentary podcast Buried Series 2: The Last Witness as the hearsay witness who recorded dead witness Douglas Gowan's final testimony. Along with husband-and-wife journalists Dan Ashby and Lucy Taylor, Sheen investigated the potential harm caused by chemical waste dumped in South Wales following reports from researcher Douglas Gowan, whom Sheen interviewed in 2017 and was mentioned in his 2017 Annual Raymond Williams Memorial Lecture. Buried Series 2: The Last Witness was named the third best podcast of 2024 by The Guardian. The podcast was shortlisted in the 2025 Amnesty International UK Media Awards for Radio & Podcasts, but did not make it to the list of finalists. Buried: The Last Witness won Grand Award at the 2025 New York Festivals Radio Awards in the Documentary: Environment & Ecology category, won Best Podcast at the 2025 DIG Awards, and was shortlisted in the 2025 True Crime Awards for Podcast: Impact For Change.

A Very Royal Scandal was released on 19 September 2024 on the streaming service Amazon Prime Video.

On 10 March 2025, the documentary Michael Sheen's Secret Million Pound Giveaway was aired on Channel 4, which explains why people are vulnerable to debt spirals, how debt-buying practices work, and how Sheen wrote off £1,000,000 of debt for 900 people in South Wales using £100,000 of his own money by secretly spending two years setting up a debt acquisition company. The programme was well-received and Sheen's heist was hailed as inspiring and "Robin Hood-like", although questions remain as to whether it will get the UK government to pass the Fair Banking Act.

On 16 March 2026, it was announced that Sheen would be the new host for the quiz show House of Games after Richard Osman's departure.

In August 2026, the two-part documentary Buried with Michael Sheen about PCB pollution in Wales and England aired on BBC Two over a two-week period. It received critical acclaim and reignited the debate over chemical pollution at the national level.

Sheen appeared on the second series of The Celebrity Traitors, which began in October 2026.

== Welsh National Theatre ==
On 10 January 2025, Sheen announced that he had launched a new national theatre for Wales named Welsh National Theatre (WNT) after the National Theatre Wales (NTW) was forced to close due to the company's £1.6m funding from the Arts Council of Wales (ACW) being cut. He would personally fund the Welsh National Theatre from the outset as well as taking on the role of artistic director. NTW's board requested ACW to transfer £200,000 from its remaining £226,000 in the Transition Fund to WNT to "deliver activity align with the original funding purpose."

On 2 April 2025, Sheen's Welsh National Theatre company revealed plans for their inaugural season with two plays: Thornton Wilder's Our Town told from the Welsh perspective, and a new play by Gary Owen called Owain & Henry, about Owain Glyndŵr's rebellion against the rule of Henry IV of England in the 15th century. Sheen will star in both plays, as Stage Manager and Owain Glyndŵr respectively.

On 18 June 2025, it was announced that the company's first headquarters would be in Swansea's civic centre, overlooking the beach of Swansea Bay, where Sheen's theatrical journey began.

Along with WNT, Sheen also founded Welsh Net – a talent scouting network across Wales to find and develop amateur and professional Welsh talent. On 22 September 2025, it was announced that BBC Studios would fund the recruitment of a team of top talent scouts for Welsh Net.

On 25 September 2025, Matthew Rhys announced his return to the Welsh stage from 16 to 26 November 2025 in the one-man play Playing Burton, celebrating the 100th anniversary of Richard Burton's birth and raising funds for the Welsh National Theatre.

On January 8 2026, Sheen topped The Stage 100 power list of 2026 for "putting Wales back on the theatre map in 2025". On January 15, 2026, it was reported that WNT had received funding from the Colwinston Charitable Trust, financed by royalties from the play The Mousetrap, to support its opening season.

Sheen took the lead in Our Town which toured from 16 January to 28 March 2026 to Swansea Grand Theatre, Venue Cymru, Theatr Clwyd and the Rose Theatre. The production was critically well received, and won Best Play Revival at the UK Theatre Awards 2026.

On 31 March 2026, it was reported that WNT would be awarded £299,829 from Arts Council of Wales for the play Owain & Henry.

On 23 April 2026, WNT announced their revival of Amadeus, starring Sheen as Salieri and Callum Scott Howells as Mozart, which will be opened at the New Theatre, Cardiff between 9 and 27 March 2027, before transferring to London's West End at the Noël Coward Theatre for a 16-week season between 17 April and 7 August 2027.

On 27 May 2026, the programme for WNT's second season was revealed: Samuel Beckett’s Rockaby presented in a triptych alongside Not I and Footfalls, starring Dame Siân Phillips and directed by Richard Beecham, as well as a revival of Frank Vickery’s comedy A Night on the Tiles, and a tour of Katie Payne’s My Mix(ed up) Tape at Edinburgh Fringe 2027. The company also launched Stage & Screen Writers’ Scheme, offering "Welsh and Wales-based early to mid-career writers working across theatre and television the opportunity to receive a commission for an original new play from Welsh National Theatre, while simultaneously developing the television adaptation with Bad Wolf." Moreover, WNT will collaborate on a pilot "for assessing theatrical productions through the lens of sensory storytelling" with sensory-led theatre Oshi’s World to "determine whether a production can be adapted with and for audiences with profound and multiple learning disabilities (PMLD)." Concurrently, WNT is also partnering with Green Room Coaching to launch a pilot program providing "confidential and unlimited therapeutic services for everyone working with WNT, both during and for six months following their engagement."

On October 2026, Sheen was nominated at the 2026 Sky Arts Awards for his work as founder and artistic director of the Welsh National Theatre.

== Other activities ==
On 5 June 2025, Sheen's debut picture book on homelessness called A Home for Spark the Dragon was published by Puffin Books. £1 from every hardback sale and 50p from every paperback sale of the book in the UK and Ireland will be donated to the national housing and homelessness charity Shelter. Speaking about the book, Sheen said: "I feel very fortunate that I got to grow up in a safe and happy home, but knowing that, for many people, this isn't the case, has increasingly made me want to do what I can to help. I've always believed that telling stories is an important way to make change in the world, and, in the long run, stories for children can make the most change of all. For these reasons, I wanted to try to tell a story for young readers about a character who loses their home... I'm proud to be publishing Spark's story in partnership with the charity Shelter, supporting the important work they do to fight the housing emergency."

On 28 September 2025, Sheen was the castaway for BBC Radio 4's Desert Island Discs. His choices included "Vienna" by Ultravox, "Desire" by Talk Talk from their album Spirit of Eden, "Ready For Drowning" by Manic Street Preachers from This Is My Truth Tell Me Yours, and the title track from Passion by Peter Gabriel.

== Charity work ==
Sheen is honorary president of Wales Council for Voluntary Action, the lead national body for the voluntary sector in Wales. Accepting the role he explained, "I plan to use my role to actively challenge and support WCVA in their impact and role in supporting the community and keeping us focused on what matters locally as well as the need for national leadership". He is also an ambassador for TREAT Trust Wales, and is the Welsh ambassador of Into Film, a charity which offers after-school film clubs to state primary and secondary schools in an effort to improve literacy levels. He is also an ambassador of the environmental charity Keep Wales Tidy.

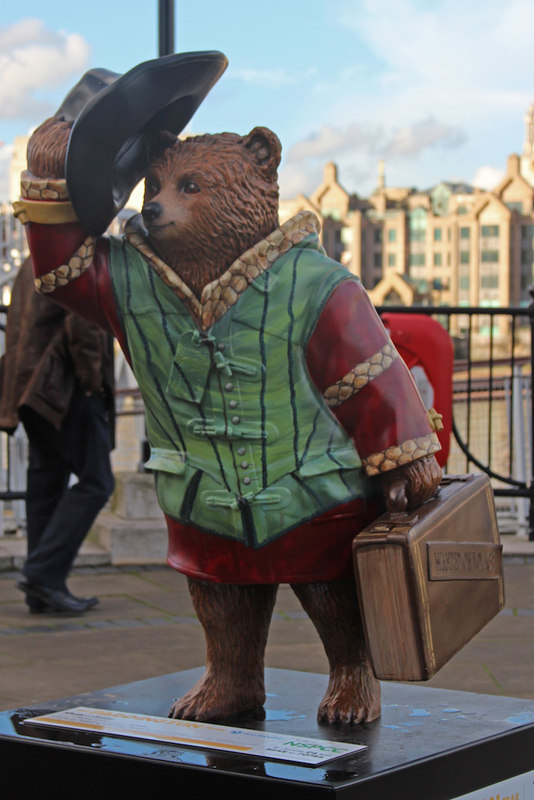
Sheen's Shakespeare-themed Paddington Bear statue outside Shakespeare's Globe in London, auctioned to raise funds for the NSPCC

Sheen is a patron of British charities, including Scene & Heard, NSPCC's Child's Voice Appeal, Healing the Wounds, The Relationships Centre, WGCADA (West Glamorgan Council on Alcohol and Drug Abuse) and Adferiad Recovery, a new organisation providing support for vulnerable people in Wales and their families and carers. He has taken part in a number of charity football matches, including captaining the winning Soccer Aid 2010 team at Wembley Stadium, as well as appearing in the 2012 and 2014 matches. He is a patron of the British Independent Film Awards, an ambassador for the Dylan Thomas Prize and vice-president of Port Talbot Town F.C. In October 2018, Sheen sponsored a women's football team in Wales.

In 2014, Sheen designed a Shakespeare-themed Paddington Bear statue. Placed outside Shakespeare's Globe, it was one of fifty statues of Paddington located around London prior to the release of the film Paddington, which were auctioned to raise funds for the NSPCC. In 2017, Sheen founded the End High Cost Credit Alliance working to promote more affordable ways to borrow money. That same year Sheen became a Patron of Social Enterprise UK, a charity which supports social projects which benefit local, environmental and co-operative causes. In October 2018, Sheen and Natasha Kaplinsky became vice-presidents (an ambassadorial role) of the Royal Society for Public Health (RSPH). Sheen is a fundraising partner with the non-profit organization, The White Curl, which supports Welsh charities. As of 2023, his campaigns with The White Curl raised over £110,000 for Welsh charities and causes.

In 2019, Sheen sold his own houses to fund the Homeless World Cup in Cardiff when its £2,000,000 funding fell through at the last minute. In 2020, he raised more than £33,000 to help people in Wales whose homes have been hit by flooding in the wake of Storm Dennis.

In 2021, Sheen invested £250,000 of his own money to launch Mab Gwalia(meaning Sons of Wales), a fund to fund community projects in Wales. The organisation currently supports 16 projects, including Mothers Matter, GROW Cymru (Growing Real Opportunities for Women), ASD Rainbows, Cwm Taf People First, Escape Artists North Wales, Street Football Wales, and Mab Gwalia Welsh Drama Student Scholarship programme in partnership with Manic Street Preachers. Each academic year, the Mab Gwalia Welsh Drama Student Scholarship awards up to £15,000 to support up to three eligible students. "Opportunity should not only be available to those who can afford it", Sheen said. He also funds the Michael Sheen Bursary for Welsh undergraduates at Jesus College, Oxford, pledging £50,000 over five years.

In December 2021, Sheen announced that he would be giving all of his future earnings to charities, declaring himself a "not-for-profit actor". That same year, he co-founded A Writing Chance, which gives new and aspiring writers from working-class and lower-income backgrounds resources and access to the writing industries. The writers and their stories would then be introduced on the Michael Sheen: Margins to Mainstream podcast on BBC Radio Wales.

In February 2024, Sheen donated £5,000 to a young boy in Wrexham with a rare genetic condition called TUBA1A through a fundraiser by Wrexham Police FC, commenting: "Very best wishes to the whole family." In March 2024, he donated another £5,000 to the amateur football and futsal club FC United of Wrexham, which was struggling financially. In November 2024, Sheen backed a charity football match to help victims of domestic abuse in North Wales organised by the Wrexham Police FC and North Wales Police and Community Trust (PACT).

In October 2024, it was reported that Sheen had used his own money to write off personal debts for hundreds of people in South Wales. On 10 March 2025, the process of Sheen clearing £1,000,000 of debt for 900 people in South Wales with £100,000 of his own money was shown in Channel 4's documentary Michael Sheen's Secret Million Pound Giveaway.

In May 2025, a literary magazine and online platform called The Bee, an extension of Sheen's earlier project A Writing Chance and aims to "fight the increasing marginalisation of working-class writers, and of working-class people in publishing", was launched.

On 20 May 2025, Sheen was listed in the 100 Most Influential People in Philanthropy 2025 by Time magazine.

On 5 June 2025, Sheen's debut picture book on homelessness called A Home for Spark the Dragon was published in association with the homelessness charity Shelter. Publisher Puffin Books and Sheen will donate £1 from every hardback sale and 50p from every paperback sale of the book in the UK and Ireland.

== Political and social activism ==
Sheen is known for political and social activism. Examples include campaigning against high-cost credit agreements, crises in local journalism and describing himself as a not-for-profit actor due to his contributions to social causes.

On 18 October 2013, Sheen wrote an open letter to the people of Newport, published in the South Wales Argus newspaper. In the letter he condemned the "absurd and tragic" demolition of the Chartist Mural. On 2 November 2013, he spoke at a conference in Newport, and was invited by city council leader Bob Bright to advise a committee on a proposal to replace the mural. Six years later, on 4 November 2019, exactly 180 years after the Newport Rising, a replica mural was unveiled in Newport.

On 24 February 2015, the 175th anniversary of the Chartist Rising in Newport, Sheen made the BBC Cymru Wales's documentary Michael Sheen's Valleys Rebellion. In it, he retraced the journey of 20,000 Chartists who walked from the Gwent Valley to the centre of Newport, explored Welsh attitudes to politics and social change in 2014, and why ordinary people and politicians seemed so far apart. The programme was nominated for Best Single Documentary and Sheen himself was nominated for Best Presenter at the 2015 BAFTA Cymru Awards. It was also nominated for a Torc Award at the 2016 Celtic Media Festival.

On 1 March 2015, Sheen joined the People's March for the NHS in Tredegar, the birthplace of the founder of the NHS Aneurin Bevan, and gave a speech on the importance of the NHS and the welfare state to a civilised, equal and compassionate society, opposing the privatisation of the NHS and opposing Conservative's austerity cuts to the UK's health service. His NHS speech went viral, with many posting and sharing clips of him speaking at the march, lauding him as "an upcoming face in politics". When asked by BBC News if he was surprised by the reaction to the speech, Sheen said: "I didn't know it was being filmed. It was a cold and very wet day. The fact that anyone turned up at all was amazing and that they stayed around was amazing." Sheen also told BBC News that he was not affiliated to any political party and that "they're all doing terrible jobs on the whole", but that he would still speak out about what he witnessed whenever he got the chance.

On 21 December 2015, Sheen started a petition calling on the Welsh Government to put an end to homeless teenagers being put into unsuitable bed and breakfast accommodation on Change.org following news of young people being murdered while staying in B&Bs with potentially dangerous ex-offenders. The petition raised more than 115,000 signatures and Sheen presented the issue directly to the Minister for Communities and Tackling Poverty Lesley Griffiths, who announced in March 2016 that the Welsh Government had issued stricter statutory guidance to local authorities to stop the use of B&B accommodation for 16 and 17 year olds once and for all.

On 8 June 2016, the documentary Michael Sheen: The Fight for My Steel Town was broadcast on BBC One Wales, in which Sheen returned to Port Talbot, the town where he grew up, to see for himself the impact on families of hundreds of jobs lost at the steelworks. Michael Sheen: The Fight for My Steel Town won BAFTA Cymru for News and Current Affairs.

On 3 June 2017, Sheen delivered his Aneurin Bevan Lecture at Hay Festival 2017 about "culture and society and the humane vision and tradition that Bevan inspires".

On 16 November 2017, Sheen spoke at the Annual Raymond Williams Memorial Lecture organised by Learning and Work Institute Wales and Open University in Merthyr, Wales. His lecture "explored themes of Welsh culture and identity, its past and its present and to look again at the question Williams once asked – Who speaks for Wales?", Brexit, the decline of local journalism in Wales, and the environmental threats to Wales from PCBs pollution near Brofiscin Quarry reported by researcher Douglas Gowan. Sheen learned about Gowan's studies when he first read an article on Wikipedia, and was then invited to visit and record a seven-hour interview as evidence for his testimony.

He has made calls for discussions about Welsh independence and has made comments about the institution of the "Prince of Wales" title.

On 8 March 2018, Sheen participated in CARE International UK's March4Women on International Women's Day. He paid tribute to suffragist and first Leader of the Labour Party, Keir Hardie and made a speech calling for gender equality.

In July 2022, Sheen made a documentary with BBC Wales Investigates called Michael Sheen: Lifting the Lid on the Care System about the experiences of children in care and found that homeless young people are still staying in B&Bs and sleeping rough, six years after the Welsh government said it wanted to eradicate the practice.

In September 2022, Sheen's stirring motivational speech for the Wales national football team ahead of the 2022 FIFA World Cup on A League of Their Own went viral. He was then invited into the Welsh camp's inner circle to deliver a team talk to coach Rob Page and the players.

In January 2024, Sheen showed support to a cross-party campaign of Plaid Cymru and Welsh Labour focused on devolving the Crown Estate to Wales.

In May 2024, Sheen joined series 2 of BBC Radio 4's award-winning podcast Buried, called Buried: The Last Witness, as the hearsay witness who recorded dead witness Douglas Gowan's final testimony. Together with presenters and investigative journalists Dan Ashby and Lucy Taylor, Sheen conducted a field investigation in South Wales and discovered the lasting impact of 'forever chemicals' on the environment, food chain and communities, and issued a warning for the future. The television documentary Buried with Michael Sheen, exposing the manufacture of PCBs by Monsanto in Newport and their dumping of large amounts of toxic industrial waste, was broadcast on BBC Two across two weeks in August 2026.

In October 2024, Sheen called for a Fair Banking Act to help tackle the unaffordable credit crisis in the UK. On 10 March 2025, in his Channel 4 documentary Michael Sheen's Secret Million Pound Giveaway, he paid off the debts of 900 people in South Wales using his own money while continuing to call on the UK government to enact the Fair Banking Act.

In 2025, Sheen became ambassador for Calon Afan - a community interest company researching and promoting the lesser-known histories of Port Talbot and the Afan Valley.

In 2026, Sheen expressed support for Plaid Cymru in the 2026 Senedd Election, saying that the election "seems to be a battle between, [...] Plaid Cymru and Reform" and when asked directly about if he was supporting Plaid Cymru he said he was.

On 10 September 2026, Sheen, alongside journalists Ashby and Taylor, gave oral evidence of high levels of carcinogenic chemicals in soil samples and the blood of residents living near sites linked to Monsanto to the Welsh Affairs Select Committee at the Houses of Parliament, urging MPs to support a nationwide testing program for old toxic waste sites. On 18 September 2026, he met with the First Minister of Wales, Rhun ap Iorwerth, and held a "constructive" discussion aimed at finding a way forward to resolve the issue.

== Personal life ==
Sheen was in a relationship with English actress Kate Beckinsale from 1995 until 2003. They met when cast in a touring production of The Seagull in early 1995, and began living together shortly afterwards. Their daughter was born in 1999 in London. Their relationship ended in January 2003, soon after the couple moved to Los Angeles. Beckinsale had persuaded director Len Wiseman to cast Sheen in Underworld; but while on set, she and Wiseman began a relationship, and subsequently married in 2004.

Sheen had a long-distance relationship with English ballet dancer Lorraine Stewart from 2004 until 2010. He dated Canadian actress Rachel McAdams from 2010 to 2013, and American comedian and actress Sarah Silverman from 2014 to 2018. He was also in a relationship with Irish comedian and actress Aisling Bea at some point.

Sheen moved from Los Angeles back to his home town of Port Talbot, Wales, around 2018. He revealed in 2019 that he was in a relationship with Swedish actress Anna Lundberg. She appeared as herself in Staged, and the couple have appeared together on Gogglebox. They have two daughters together, born in September 2019 and May 2022.

He is a supporter of Swansea City.

After the death of his father Meyrick in 2025, Sheen described him as "an extraordinary character" and said he and his family had received "an outpouring of love and messages".

== Awards and recognition ==
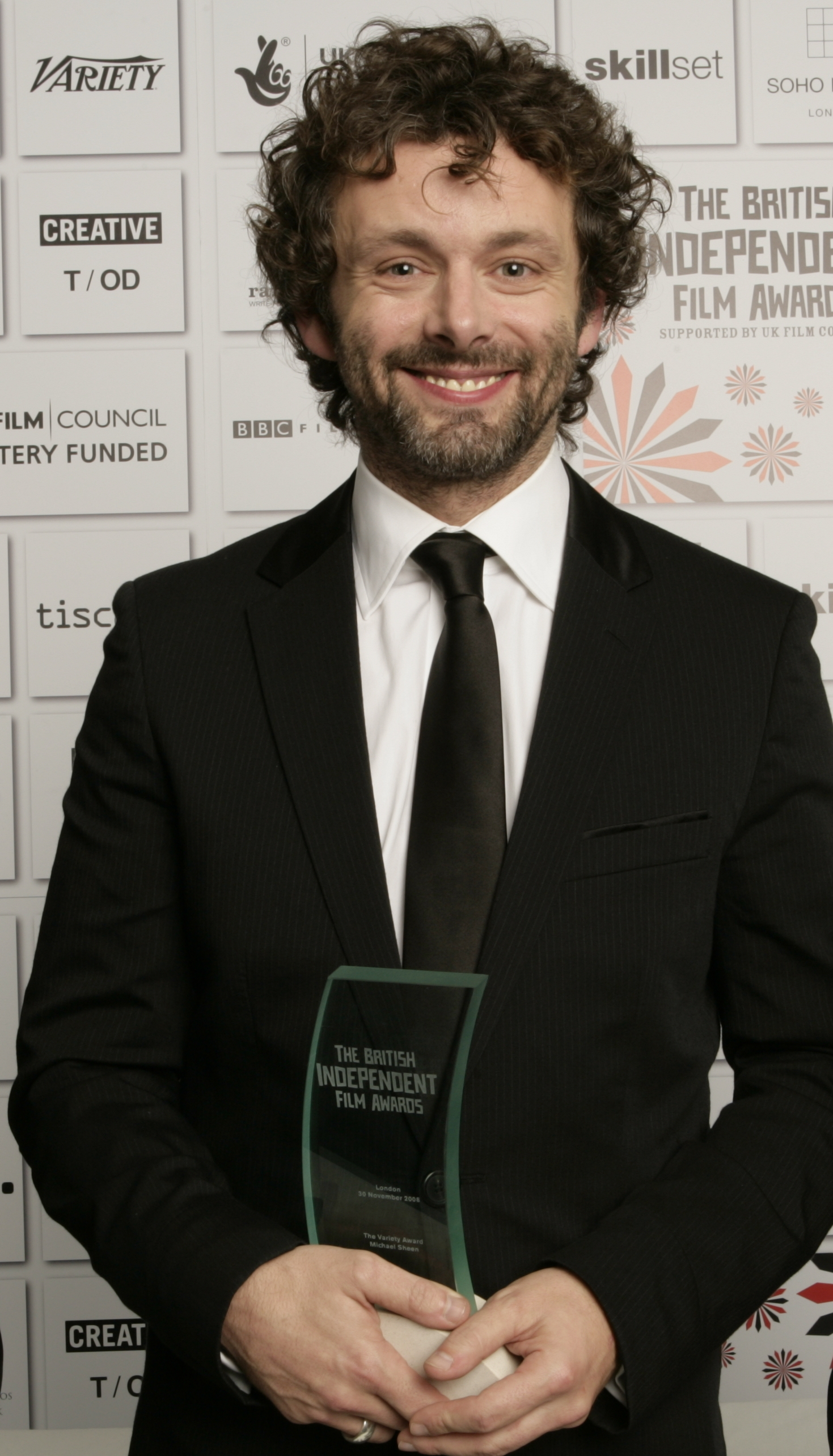
Michael Sheen with his Variety Award at British Independent Film Awards 2008

=== Theatre awards ===
==== Manchester Evening News Theatre Awards ====
| Year | Category | Nominated work | Result | Ref. |
|---|---|---|---|---|
| 1992 | Best Actor | Romeo and Juliet | Nominated | |

==== Ian Charleson Award ====
| Year | Category | Nominated work | Result | Ref. |
|---|---|---|---|---|
| 1993 | Commendation | Don't Fool with Love | Won | |
| 1997 | Special Commendation | Henry V | Won | |

==== Laurence Olivier Awards ====
| Year | Category | Nominated work | Result | Ref. |
|---|---|---|---|---|
| 1998 | Best Supporting Performance | Amadeus | Nominated | |
| 1999 | Best Actor | Look Back in Anger | Nominated | |
| 2003 | Best Actor | Caligula | Nominated | |
| 2006 | Best Actor | Frost/Nixon | Nominated | |

==== Outer Critics Circle Awards ====
| Year | Category | Nominated work | Result | Ref. |
|---|---|---|---|---|
| 1999 | Outstanding Actor | Amadeus | Nominated | |

==== Evening Standard Theatre Awards ====
| Year | Category | Nominated work | Result | Ref. |
|---|---|---|---|---|
| 1999 | Best Actor | Look Back in Anger | Nominated | |
| 2003 | Best Actor | Caligula | Won | |

==== Critics Circle Theatre Awards ====
| Year | Category | Nominated work | Result | Ref. |
|---|---|---|---|---|
| 2003 | Best Actor | Caligula | Won | |

==== Drama League Awards ====
| Year | Category | Nominated work | Result | Ref. |
|---|---|---|---|---|
| 2007 | Distinguished Performance | Frost/Nixon | Nominated | |

==== UK Theatre Awards ====
| Year | Category | Nominated work | Result | Ref. |
|---|---|---|---|---|
| 2011 | Best Director | The Passion | Won | |

==== BroadwayWorld Australia - Sydney Awards ====
| Year | Category | Nominated work | Result | Ref. |
|---|---|---|---|---|
| 2023 | Best Performer in a Play | Amadeus | Won | |

==== WhatsOnStage Awards ====
| Year | Category | Nominated work | Result | Ref. |
|---|---|---|---|---|
| 2025 | Best Performer in a Play | Nye | Nominated | |

==== Sky Arts Awards ====
| Year | Category | Nominated work | Result | Ref. |
|---|---|---|---|---|
| 2026 | Theatre | Welsh National Theatre | Nominated | |

=== Screen awards ===
==== Royal Television Society Awards ====
| Year | Category | Nominated work | Result | Ref. |
|---|---|---|---|---|
| 2004 | Best Actor | Dirty Filthy Love | Nominated | |
| 2006 | Best Actor | Fantabulosa! | Won | |

==== British Academy Television Awards ====
| Year | Category | Nominated work | Result | Ref. |
|---|---|---|---|---|
| 2005 | Best Actor | Dirty Filthy Love | Nominated | |
| 2007 | Best Actor | Fantabulosa! | Nominated | |
| 2021 | Best Supporting Actor | Quiz | Nominated | |

==== British Academy Film Awards ====
| Year | Category | Nominated work | Result | Ref. |
|---|---|---|---|---|
| 2006 | Best Actor in a Supporting Role | The Queen | Nominated | |

Broadcasting Press Guild Award

| Year | Category | Nominated work(s) | Result | Ref. |
|---|---|---|---|---|
| 2007 | Best Actor | Fantabulosa!, H. G. Wells: War with the World and Ancient Rome: The Rise and Fall of an Empire | Nominated | |

==== Chicago Film Critics Association Awards ====
| Year | Category | Nominated work | Result | Ref. |
|---|---|---|---|---|
| 2006 | Best Supporting Actor | The Queen | Nominated | |

==== Los Angeles Film Critics Association Awards ====
| Year | Category | Nominated work | Result | Ref. |
|---|---|---|---|---|
| 2006 | Best Supporting Actor | The Queen | Won | |

==== New York Film Critics Online ====
| Year | Category | Nominated work | Result | Ref. |
|---|---|---|---|---|
| 2006 | Best Supporting Actor | The Queen | Won | |

==== Kansas City Film Critics Circle Awards ====
| Year | Category | Nominated work | Result | Ref. |
|---|---|---|---|---|
| 2006 | Best Supporting Actor | The Queen | Won | |

==== Toronto Film Critics Association Awards ====
| Year | Category | Nominated work | Result | Ref. |
|---|---|---|---|---|
| 2006 | Best Supporting Actor | The Queen | Won | |

==== Utah Film Critics Association Awards ====
| Year | Category | Nominated work | Result | Ref. |
|---|---|---|---|---|
| 2006 | Best Supporting Actor | The Queen | Won | |

==== International CinePhile Society Awards ====
| Year | Category | Nominated work | Result | Ref. |
|---|---|---|---|---|
| 2007 | Best Supporting Actor | The Queen | Won | |

==== St. Louis Gateway Film Critics Association Awards ====
| Year | Category | Nominated work | Result | Ref. |
|---|---|---|---|---|
| 2007 | Best Supporting Actor | Music Within | Nominated | |

==== BAFTA Cymru ====
| Year | Category | Nominated work | Result | Ref. |
|---|---|---|---|---|
| 1999 | Best Documentary/Drama Documentary | Bright Smoke: Michael Sheen Profile | Nominated | |
| 2007 | Tlws Siân Phillips Award | | Won | |
| 2013 | Best Actor | The Gospel of Us | Won | |
| 2015 | Best Presenter | Michael Sheen's Valley's Rebellion | Nominated | |
| 2017 | Best Actor | Aberfan: The Green Hollow | Nominated | |
| 2017 | News and Current Affairs | Michael Sheen: The Fight For My Steel Town | Won | |
| 2019 | Best Actor | Apostle | Nominated | |
| 2021 | Best Actor | Quiz | Nominated | |

==== Celtic Media Festival ====
| Year | Category | Nominated work | Result | Ref. |
|---|---|---|---|---|
| 2016 | Torc Award | Michael Sheen's Valley's Rebellion | Nominated | |

==== Evening Standard British Film Awards ====
| Year | Category | Nominated work | Result | Ref. |
|---|---|---|---|---|
| 2008 | Best Actor | Frost/Nixon | Won | |

==== London Film Critics Circle Awards ====
| Year | Category | Nominated work | Result | Ref. |
|---|---|---|---|---|
| 2008 | British Actor of the Year | Frost/Nixon | Nominated | |

==== Actor Awards ====
| Year | Category | Nominated work | Result | Ref. |
|---|---|---|---|---|
| 2008 | Outstanding Performance by a Cast in a Motion Picture | Frost/Nixon | Nominated | |
| 2012 | Outstanding Performance by a Cast in a Motion Picture | Midnight in Paris | Nominated | |

==== British Independent Film Awards ====
| Year | Category | Nominated work | Result | Ref. |
|---|---|---|---|---|
| 2008 | Variety Award | | Won | |

==== Valenciennes International Festival of Action and Adventure Films ====
| Year | Category | Nominated work | Result | Ref. |
|---|---|---|---|---|
| 2009 | Best Actor | Frost/Nixon | Won | |

==== GQ Magazine ====
| Year | Category | Nominated work | Result | Ref. |
|---|---|---|---|---|
| 2009 | Actor of the Year | | Won | |

==== Satellite Awards ====
| Year | Category | Nominated work | Result | Ref. |
|---|---|---|---|---|
| 2009 | Best Actor - Motion Picture | The Damned United | Nominated | |
| 2014 | Best Actor in a Drama Series | Masters of Sex | Nominated | |

==== Digital Spy Movie Awards ====
| Year | Category | Nominated work | Result | Ref. |
|---|---|---|---|---|
| 2009 | Actor of The Year | | Won | |

==== Emmy Awards ====
| Year | Category | Nominated work | Result | Ref. |
|---|---|---|---|---|
| 2010 | Outstanding Lead Actor - Miniseries or a Movie | The Special Relationship | Nominated | |

==== OFTA Television Awards ====
| Year | Category | Nominated work | Result | Ref. |
|---|---|---|---|---|
| 2010 | Best Actor in a Motion Picture or Limited Series | The Special Relationships | Nominated | |
| 2010 | Best Actor in a Comedy Series | 30 Rock | Nominated | |
| 2020 | Best Supporting Actor in a Motion Picture or Limited Series | Quiz | Nominated | |

==== Britannia Awards ====
| Year | Category | Nominated work | Result | Ref. |
|---|---|---|---|---|
| 2010 | British Artist of the Year | | Won | |

==== Empire Cinemas Alternative Movie Awards ====
| Year | Category | Nominated work | Result | Ref. |
|---|---|---|---|---|
| 2013 | Best Film Villain | The Twilight Saga: Breaking Dawn - Part 2 | Won | |

==== Golden Globe Awards ====
| Year | Category | Nominated work | Result | Ref. |
|---|---|---|---|---|
| 2013 | Best Actor - Television Series Drama | Masters of Sex | Nominated | |

==== Critics' Choice Television Awards ====
| Year | Category | Nominated work | Result | Ref. |
|---|---|---|---|---|
| 2014 | Best Actor in a Drama Series | Masters of Sex | Nominated | |

==== Fright Meter Awards ====
| Year | Category | Nominated work | Result | Ref. |
|---|---|---|---|---|
| 2018 | Best Supporting Actor | Apostle | Nominated | |

==== Variety Club Showbiz Awards ====
| Year | Category | Nominated work | Result | Ref. |
|---|---|---|---|---|
| 2009 | Film Actor of the Year | Frost/Nixon and The Damned United | Won | |

==== Saturn Awards ====
| Year | Category | Nominated work | Result | Ref. |
|---|---|---|---|---|
| 2019 | Best Supporting Actor in a Streaming Presentation | Good Omens | Nominated | |

==== Tell-Tale TV Awards ====
| Year | Category | Nominated work | Result | Ref. |
|---|---|---|---|---|
| 2020 | Favorite Actor in a Limited Series or TV Movie | Good Omens | Nominated | |
| 2024 | Favorite Performer in a Sci-Fi / Fantasy / Horror Series | Good Omens | Won | |

==== Series Mania ====
| Year | Category | Nominated work | Result | Ref. |
|---|---|---|---|---|
| 2023 | Best Actor in International Competition | Best Interests | Won | |

==== TV Choice Awards ====
| Year | Category | Nominated work | Result | Ref. |
|---|---|---|---|---|
| 2024 | Best Actor | Best Interests | Nominated | |
| 2025 | Best Drama Performance | A Very Royal Scandal | Nominated | |

==== ASTRA Television Awards ====
| Year | Category | Nominated work | Result | Ref. |
|---|---|---|---|---|
| 2024 | Best Actor in a Streaming Comedy Series | Good Omens | Nominated | |

==== Edinburgh TV Festival Awards ====
| Year | Category | Nominated work | Result | Ref. |
|---|---|---|---|---|
| 2024 | TV Moment of The Year | Leo has a question for Michael Sheen - The Assembly | Nominated | |

==== National Television Awards ====
| Year | Category | Nominated work | Result | Ref. |
|---|---|---|---|---|
| 2025 | Best Drama Performance | A Very Royal Scandal | Nominated | |

==== Scope Awards ====
| Year | Category | Nominated work | Result | Ref. |
|---|---|---|---|---|
| 2025 | Media Moment | The Assembly | Won | |

=== Literary awards ===
==== Audio Production Awards ====
| Year | Category | Nominated work | Result | Ref. |
|---|---|---|---|---|
| 2018 | Audiobook Narrator of the Year | La Belle Sauvage | Shortlisted | |

==== British Book Awards ====
| Year | Category | Nominated work | Result | Ref. |
|---|---|---|---|---|
| 2018 | Audiobook of the Year | La Belle Sauvage | Won | |
| 2020 | Audiobook of the Year | The Secret Commonwealth | Shortlisted | |
| 2026 | Fiction Audiobook of the Year | The Rose Field | Shortlisted | |

==== CAMEO Awards ====
| Year | Category | Nominated work | Result | Ref. |
|---|---|---|---|---|
| 2019 | Book to Audio | La Belle Sauvage | Won | |

==== CAMEO Awards USA ====
| Year | Category | Nominated work | Result | Ref. |
|---|---|---|---|---|
| 2019 | Book to Audio | La Belle Sauvage | Shortlisted | |

==== New York Festival Radio Awards ====
| Year | Category | Nominated work | Result | Ref. |
|---|---|---|---|---|
| 2019 | Best Narration - Solo | La Belle Sauvage | Won | |
| 2020 | Best Narration - Solo | The Secret Commonwealth | Won | |

==== Odyssey Award ====
| Year | Category | Nominated work | Result | Ref. |
|---|---|---|---|---|
| 2018 | Excellence in Audiobook Production | La Belle Sauvage | Honoured | |

==== Earphones Awards ====
| Year | Category | Nominated work | Result | Ref. |
|---|---|---|---|---|
| 2019 | AudioFile Earphones Award | The Secret Commonwealth | Won | |

=== Philanthropy awards ===
- St David Awards for International Award (2015)
- St David's Society of New York Awards for William R. Hopkins Bronze Medal (2015)
- It's My Shout Awards for Inspiration Award (2016)
- Royal Society for Public Health Award for Outstanding Contribution to Championing the Public's Health (2017)
- Welsh Housing Awards for Outstanding Contribution to Housing (2019)
- Beard Liberation Front Award for Beard of the Year (2020)
- Beard Liberation Front Award for Lifetime Achievement Award (2021)
- Worshipful Livery Company of Wales Awards for Outstanding Achievement Award (2021)
- Community Foundation Wales Philanthropy Award (2024)
- Time 100 Philanthropy - Innovator (2025)
- Stalls to Stage Awards for Gavin Creel Community Champion Award (2026)

=== Return of OBE ===
Sheen was appointed Officer of the Order of the British Empire (OBE) in the 2009 New Year Honours for his services to drama. In 2020, Sheen revealed, during an online interview with Owen Jones, that he had "handed back" the medal after doing research for a lecture on the relationship between Wales and the British state, saying "I didn't mean any disrespect but I just realised I'd be a hypocrite if I said the things I was going to say in the lecture about the nature of the relationship between Wales and the British state". Individuals who voluntarily renounce an honour continue to legally hold it unless it is annulled by the monarch.

=== Other honours ===
He was awarded the freedom of the borough of Neath Port Talbot, Wales in 2008 for his services in the field of the dramatic arts. He is an Honorary Fellow of the University of Wales, Newport, the Royal Welsh College of Music & Drama, Swansea University, Aberystwyth University, Swansea Metropolitan University, Cardiff University, and Royal Academy of Dramatic Art, and has been awarded the James Joyce Award by University College Dublin. Sheen was given an Honorary Doctorate as Doctor of Arts by University of Wales in 2013.

== In popular culture ==
In 2016, a Welsh band called Stay Voiceless sampled Sheen's 2015 NHS rally speech in Tredegar in their single "Those Kids Have No Idea Whatsoever Of What Went On At Stalingrad".

In 2020, Tom Rosenthal released the song "Flourishing", which includes the lyrics "Send a note to Michael Sheen", and in the music video for the song, Rosenthal is seen writing a note to Michael Sheen.

In June 2021, The Barry Horns released the bilingual single 'Cymru Rydd' for the UEFA Euro 2020, which "features a middle 8 vocal sample kindly permitted by Michael Sheen" from his 2017 Annual Raymond Williams Memorial Lecture.

In 2022, a mural depicting Sheen appeared in his hometown of Port Talbot. After his father Meyrick Sheen died in May 2025, a tribute portrait of Meyrick was added next to him.

In 2025, Australian musician Avalon Kane composed and released the song "Michael Sheen" featuring Stu Patterson on her album Dissension. In her interview with Earmilk, Kane said: "This song was written selfishly by me for Michael Sheen, one of the greatest actors of our time. He is so wickedly clever. I cannot get enough of him on the screen. One of my favourite franchises is Underworld, and he plays the best Wolf ever made. The sounds for Michael Sheen reflect the sexy undertones of Underworld and the unnatural. It was so much fun letting the sounds go into this gorgeous cinematic soundscape with Stu's amazing, modulated clarinet".

== List of performances ==
In addition to theatre, film and television credits, Sheen has also appeared in many radio productions, particularly in the early years of his career. Notable radio play appearances include Strangers on a Train (1994) opposite Bill Nighy, The Importance of Being Earnest (1995) opposite Judi Dench, Romeo and Juliet (1997) opposite Kate Beckinsale, Troy (1998) and The Pretenders (2004) both opposite Paul Scofield. He has narrated six novels for BBC Radio 4 and Naxos AudioBooks: Crime and Punishment (1994), The Idiot (1995), The Picture of Dorian Gray (1995), A White Merc With Fins (1997), Salmon Fishing in the Yemen (2011) and The Ocean at the End of the Lane (2013).

In 2010, he starred as a chess player in the music video for the Manic Street Preachers' single "(It's Not War) Just the End of Love", alongside actress Anna Friel. In 2020, Sheen played a man who discovered that his toaster is magical in the music video for the track "Corner Of My Sky" by Kelly Lee Owens featuring John Cale.
