= Healing the Wounds =

British veterans organisation

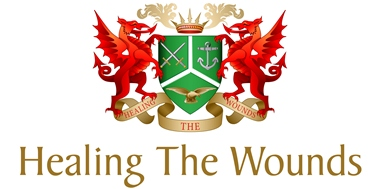
- Abbreviation: HTW
- Formation: 2009
- Type: Charity
- Purpose: Supporting British Armed Forces servicemen and women with posttraumatic stress disorder
- Headquarters: Tondu, Bridgend
- Region served: Wales
- Executive Director: Kevin Richards (founder)
- Website: healingthewounds.co.uk

Healing the Wounds (HTW) is a British charity launched in December 2009 to help provide support and care for British servicemen and women suffering from post-traumatic stress disorder It was founded by Kevin Richards, a former British Army combat medic, who recognised the lack of aftercare support and treatment for sufferers of PTSD in Wales.

== History ==
Healing the Wounds was founded by Kevin Richards in 2009. Richards had previously served with the Royal Regiment of Wales as a combat medic and completed tours of duty in numerous countries including Northern Ireland and Operation Desert Storm. His involvement with the Royal Welsh Veterans Association and his own background in army medicine led him to recognise the lack of support for PTSD sufferers in Wales and made him determined to do something to help.

== Campaigns ==
=== Golden Grove Mansion Appeal ===
Since Healing the Wounds' foundation, the charity campaigned to raise funds to purchase and maintain a convalescent home based at Golden Grove Mansion in Llandeilo, Carmarthenshire. However, by January 2011 the condition of Golden Grove had deteriorated to such an extent that it would not have been financially viable to renovate and maintain the mansion as a retreat for PTSD sufferers. Nevertheless, Healing the Wounds remains devoted to the development of a convalescent home within Wales and the £120,000 raised through the campaign shall be spent on treatment for those suffering from PTSD.

== Fundraising activities ==
=== Nation Radio campaign ===
Between 14 November and 2 December 2011, Healing the Wounds was chosen as a nominated charity for a fundraising campaign by South Wales radio station, Nation Radio.

== Criticism ==
A BBC investigation criticised Healing the Wounds' use of Neuro-linguistic programming and the inaccurate description of the experience of one of its counsellors.

Major Flaw on the BBC Programme

____________________________________________________________________________________________________

It came to light that, the Veteran on the programme Mr Justin Martin who stated that he had served 10 years and saw combat in Iraq, and where he suffered PTSD after events where he saw comrades killed in action, were in fact lies. His military service was checked and confirmed that Justin Martin only served a total of two weeks in basic training where he injured his knee and was discharged from the Army. The BBC were given false information which was aired regarding Justin Martins Military service. Other errors aired by interviewees were based on hearsay and not physical information.

== Trustees ==
The trustees are:

- William John – Chairman of the Bridgend Branch of The Royal Welsh Association
- Arfon Williams – Former Combat Medic, Royal Regiment of Wales and current Vice Chairman of the British Legion, Ynysybwl Branch

== Patrons ==
The patrons are:

- Brigadier Robert Aitken CBE
- Michael Sheen, actor
- Nigel Owens, rugby union referee
