= Buried with Michael Sheen =

2026 BBC television documentary

Buried with Michael Sheen is a two-part BBC television documentary, presented by actor Michael Sheen, first broadcast in August 2026. It explored chemical waste dumping across Wales and parts of England by US company Monsanto.

== Background ==
Sheen first stumbled across the subject when he spotted a line on Wikipedia about a man named Douglas Gowan, who had discovered high levels of toxic chemicals on farmland in South Wales. In 2017 Sheen tracked Gowan down and, finding he was terminally ill, spent a weekend recording interviews about Gowan's story, his discovery of polychlorinated biphenyls (PCBs) and his attempts to publicise the issue. Gowan had first discovered PCBs in 1967 while working in South Wales for the National Farmers Union who'd received reports of mysterious farm animal deaths near Brofiscin Quarry. Agri-chemical company Monsanto, the world's main PCBs producer, had a production plant from the 1940s to the 1970s in the nearby town of Newport. Over subsequent years Gowan was threatened, attacked and beaten up, sued in court and ridiculed by establishment figures. In 2018, two months after recording his interview with Sheen, Gowan died.

Many years later the dangers of PCBs were recognised and its production was banned in 151 countries.

Sheen raised the story in a 2017 Raymond Williams Memorial Lecture.

As a result of Sheen's work, in 2024 the BBC broadcast a podcast series on BBC Radio 4 called Buried: The Last Witness. Following the success of the podcast, in January 2026 BBC Factual and BBC Cymru Wales commissioned a two-part investigative television documentary series titled Buried with Michael Sheen, to be hosted by Sheen.

== Production ==
The commissioning editors were Jack Bootle, for BBC specialist factual and Nick Andrews, for BBC Cymru Wales. The series was co-produced by Wall to Wall and Smoke Trail Productions (the latter had produced the earlier BBC Buried podcast). The programme producer was Jacci Parry and the director was Mags Gavan.

Sheen allowed himself to be tested during the filming of the series, and was shocked to find he had PCBs contamination in his blood.

== Broadcast ==
The first episode was broadcast on BBC One in Wales and BBC Two in the rest of the United Kingdom on 17 August 2026. It was also made available on BBC iPlayer.

=== Episode 1 ===
In 2017, actor Michael Sheen stumbled upon the story of Douglas Gowan, who accused the chemical giant Monsanto of poisoning people in Wales through illegal dumping of PCBs, and subsequently met with, interviewed, and recorded his allegations before Gowan passed away. Years after Sheen publicly spoke out about Gowan, journalists Dan Ashby and Lucy Taylor contacted him, and the three of them formed a team to work with the materials Gowan had left behind. Sheen conducted an investigation and collected soil samples from sites Gowan had identified as contaminated, including Groes-faen, Ynysddu, Brofiscin Quarry, Newport, and Alvanley. Residents in these areas, including their dogs, have developed rare forms of cancer. Test results revealed that PCB levels at the sampled sites were between 140 and 2,000 times higher than the UK average. He also flew to Anniston, Alabama - where a successful lawsuit had been won against Monsanto for burying and dumping PCBs into the local water supply, to interview residents and lawyers.

=== Episode 2 ===
Sheen continued the investigation, this time focusing on Ruabon, where Monsanto had operated a plant and discharged PCBs into the surrounding area. Sheen, Ashby, and Taylor met with MP Steve Witherden, who confirmed that the cost of cleaning up the chemical contamination was too expensive for the local authorities, leaving them powerless despite their deep concern over the issue. Sheen and the interviewed residents living near the contaminated sites agreed to undergo blood testing to provide evidence. Ashby and Taylor met with an oncologist to explore the link between chemical exposure and cancer, and visited the London Zoo, where scientists stated that PCBs were driving UK marine life toward extinction. Sheen’s blood samples revealed the presence of 81 types of PCBs, including 2 of the 12 dioxin-like varieties, despite the fact that he did not live near the contaminated areas. Sheen spoke about this issue at the Senedd building in Cardiff, in the presence of Ashby, Taylor, and the interviewees.

== Reception ==
=== Critical response ===
The Guardian reviewer gives 4 out of 5 stars for the first episode, saying "the best qualified person to present this two-parter is the award-winning Hollywood star ...passionate about the outrage, but sober in his pursuit of truth. It proves to be a story that keeps throwing up moments and characters for which a scriptwriter would congratulate themselves."

The Telegraph gives five stars, saying the documentary "is part of a TV trend – David vs Goliath industrial scandals in which the heroes are ordinary British folk like me and thee." It says "the characters involved were perfect." Of the villains it says "what we got was a prime, rage-inducing example of how to be – and remain – unaccountable."

The Financial Times is also positive, giving five stars, saying the "story remains infuriating, gripping and very well told." They say Sheen "leads the audience through a story that resembles a thriller ...As his fury and distress grow, it is difficult not to share his absolute outrage."

== Aftermath ==
Sheen hoped the people responsible for the contamination could be held to account. He also hoped a clean-up could take place, though local authorities were "terrified" of the potential cost. Caerphilly and Wrexham councils, for example, said that their investigations had concluded that the dumping sites did not meet the legal definition of 'contaminated land'.

In the week of the broadcast, Wales Environment Link (WEL) contacted the UK Government, demanding that (because the pollution happened before Welsh devolution) they fund the clean-up operations. The Department for Environment, Food and Rural Affairs refused to respond.

Sheen and journalists Dan Ashby and Lucy Taylor appeared before the Welsh Affairs Select Committee on 10 September 2026, where they were questioned about testing and clean-up of the suspected dumping sites. The committee chair, Ruth Jones, called the findings "disturbing".

Sheen offered to meet Wales' First Minister, Rhun ap Iorwerth in August 2026. On 18 September 2026 he was able to have a "constructive" meeting to find ways to take the issue forward.

Following the release of the documentary, calls emerged for blood testing and a nationwide investigation into hazardous waste disposal across Wales. Senedd members backed calls for Welsh and UK governments to make polluters pay for cleaning up contaminated land, while providing funding for sites where the costs cannot be recovered. A cross-party coalition of 57 Welsh politicians, including MP Steve Witherden who appeared in the documentary, has united to demand comprehensive blood, soil, and water testing around historic chemical waste and toxic dump sites.
