= Douglas Gowan =

English researcher on PCBs (1943-2018)

Douglas Gowan (1943–2018) was a former Assistant Parliamentary Secretary at the National Farmers Union and a researcher on PCBs. He found pollution near Brofiscin Quarry, near Llantrisant in South Wales and filed the first official report in 1972 after nine cows on a local farm died of poisoning.

In 2007 The Ecologist reported that Gowan had been offered witness protection after receiving death threats. He also stated that he had been discredited by Monsanto through a two-year smear campaign. His testing equipment was frequently vandalised and he was assaulted on site. At one stage attempts were made to bribe him and he was severely beaten by two men with iron bars, at Dolphin Square in London, leaving him with broken ribs.

Welsh actor Michael Sheen first read Gowan's name in an article in Wikipedia in 2017, (Note: The reference Sheen read may have been the sentence "The Ecologist claimed in a 2007 article that IBT had provided expert testimony against Douglas Gowan during a court case ..." in the article Industrial Bio-Test Laboratories, which was in the encyclopedia during 2017.) visited him and recorded a seven-hour interview, and spoke about him in his 2017 Raymond Williams Memorial Lecture.

His work formed the basis of the BBC Radio 4 series Buried: The Last Witness, first broadcast in June 2024. Following the podcast's success, BBC Factual and BBC Cymru Wales commissioned a two-part investigative documentary series titled Buried with Michael Sheen, hosted by Michael Sheen, to bring Gowan's findings to a wider audience. The documentary, exposing the manufacture of PCBs by Monsanto in Newport and their dumping of large amounts of toxic industrial waste, was broadcast on BBC Two across two weeks in August 2026. Buried with Michael Sheen was well-received and prompted dozens of people to contact BBC Wales and Sheen to share their experiences regarding PCBs dumping. Chair of the Welsh Affairs Committee Ruth Jones called on the UK Government to increase funding to tackle pollution from abandoned metal mines, support at-risk communities, and coordinate testing across the UK following the documentary.

Gowan’s findings became the central subject of the 2026 book The Last Witness: One Man’s Fight to Expose a Chemical Contamination Scandal, and the Conspiracy to Silence Him, written by co-creators of the podcast Buried Dan Ashby and Lucy Taylor, with a foreword by Michael Sheen.

== Bibliography ==
Gowan, Douglas (1972). Slurry and Farm Waste Disposal. Farming Press. ISBN 0-852-36021-5, 978-0-85236-021-7
