= Burial (disambiguation) =

Burial is the ritual act of placing a dead person or animal into the ground.

Burial or The Burial may also refer to:

== Music ==
- Burial (musician)
- Burial (Burial album), 2006
- Burial (Death in June album), 1984
- Burial (Extol album), 1998
- Burials (album), a 2013 album by AFI
- "Burial", a song by God Is an Astronaut from the album Ghost Tapes #10
- "Burial", a song by Miike Snow from the 2009 album Miike Snow (album)
- "Burial", a song by Yogi featuring Pusha T
- The Burial (English band), an Oi! band
- The Burial (American band), a Christian metal band

== Other uses ==
- Burial (wrestling), a professional wrestling angle
- Burial (film), a 2022 British film
- The Burial (film), a 2023 American courtroom drama
- Burial (Reacher), a 2023 TV episode
- Burial (Yellowjackets), an episode of the American TV series Yellowjackets
- Burial strategy

== See also ==
- Buried (disambiguation)
- Bury (disambiguation)
