= Bury =

Bury may refer to:

- The burial of human remains
- -bury, a suffix in English placenames

== Places ==
=== England ===
- Bury, Cambridgeshire, a village
- Bury, Greater Manchester, a town, historically in Lancashire
  - Bury (constituency) (1832–1950)
  - County Borough of Bury, 1846–1974
  - Metropolitan Borough of Bury, from 1974
  - Bury Rural District, 1894–1933
- Bury, Somerset, a hamlet
- Bury, West Sussex, a village and civil parish
  - Bury (ward)
- Bury St Edmunds, a town in Suffolk, commonly referred to as Bury
- New Bury, a suburb of Farnworth in the Bolton district of Greater Manchester

=== Elsewhere ===
- Bury, Hainaut, Belgium, a village in the commune of Péruwelz, Wallonia
- Bury, Quebec, Canada, a municipality
- Bury, Oise, France, a commune

== Sports ==
- Bury (professional wrestling), a slang term used in the world of wrestling
- Bury F.C., a professional football team in Bury, northern England
- Bury Town F.C., a football team from Bury St Edmunds, south-east England

== Other uses ==
- Bury (surname)
- Bury (The Fall song)
- HMS Bury (1919), a Royal Navy First World War minesweeper
- Horace Bury, a character in the science fiction novel The Mote in God's Eye

== See also ==
- Bury, Curtis and Kennedy, British locomotive builder
