= Htw saar =

Higher education institution in Saarbrücken, Germany

Coordinates: 49°14′8″N 6°58′32″E

htw saar Saarland University of Applied Sciences
- Hochschule für Technik und Wirtschaft des Saarlandes
- Former names: Staatliche Höhere Technische Lehranstalt (1946–1956); Staatliche Ingenieurschule (1956-1971); Fachhochschule des Saarlandes (1971–1991)
- Type: Public
- Established: 1946
- Total staff: 1024
- Students: 6013
- Location: Saarbrücken, SL, Germany
- Website: htwsaar.de/en

Saarland University of Applied Sciences (German: Hochschule für Technik und Wirtschaft des Saarlandes, abbreviated htw saar) is a public university at Saarbrücken, Germany, founded in 1946.

== Faculties ==
htw saar consists of four constituent faculties, which offer a total of 42 study programs:

School of Architecture and Civil Engineering
Bachelor's degrees	Master's degrees
Architecture B.A.; Civil Engineering B.Eng.; Environmental Engineering B.Eng.	Architecture M.A.; Civil Engineering M.Eng.
School of Engineering
Bachelor's degrees	Master's degrees
Mechanical Engineering B.Eng.; Biomedical Engineering B.Sc.; Electrical Engineering and Information Technology B.Eng.; Renewable Energies/Energy Systems Engineering B.Eng.; Automotive Engineering B.Eng.; Communication Informatics B.Sc.; Mechanical Engineering / Process Engineering B.Eng.; Mechatronics / Sensor Technology B.Sc.; Practical Computer Science B.Sc.; Production Informatics B.Sc.	Electrical Engineering and Information Technology M.Sc.; Engineering and Management M.Eng.; Automotive Engineering M.Eng.; Communication Informatics M.Sc.; Mechatronics M.Sc.; Medical Physics M.Sc.; Neural Engineering M.Sc.; Practical Computer Science M.Sc.
School of Social Sciences
Bachelor's degrees	Master's degrees
Applied Health Sciences B.A.; Applied Midwifery Science B.Sc.; Midwifery Science - Fields of Action and Professional Development B.Sc.; Management and Vocational Education in the Healthcare Sector B.A.; Childhood Education B.A.; Social Work and Childhood Education B.A.	Social Work M.A.
Business School
Bachelor's degrees	Master's degrees
Business Administration B.A.; Digital Business and IT B.Sc.; International Business B.A.; International Tourism Management B.A.; Industrial Engineering B.Sc.	Leisure, Sports and Tourism Management M.A.; International Management M.A.; Cultural Management M.A.; Marketing Science M.Sc.; Rechnungs-, Prüfungs- und Finanzwesen M.A.; Supply Chain Management M.Sc.; Industrial Engineering M.Sc.
