= FC United of Wrexham =

Defunct sports club in Wrexham, Wales

F.C. United of Wrexham
- Full name: FC United of Wrexham
- Nickname: The Other Wrexham
- Founded: 2020; 6 years ago
- Dissolved: 25 July 2025; 12 months ago
- Ground: Clywedog Sports
- Chairperson: Adam Alfi
- Manager: Andrew Ruscoe
- League: FAW Futsal League
- 2022–23: North East Wales Championship, 7th of 9

FC United of Wrexham was an amateur football and futsal club based in Wrexham, Wales. They formerly played in the North East Wales Championship, the fifth tier of the Welsh football league system, and played home matches at Bronwen Green.

The club was founded in 2020 by Andrew Ruscoe, Tom Winsper, and Morgan Churchill, following the dissolution of the Brickfield Rangers futsal programme. It was dissolved in July 2025.

== History ==
The club was founded in 2020 by former Prestatyn Town F.C. manager Andrew Ruscoe, referee Tom Winsper and former Wrexham AFC Women player, Morgan Churchill, following the disbanding of the Brickfield Rangers Futsal team.

The club managed a senior men’s football team which competed in the North East Wales League Championship Division, and male, female and junior futsal teams. The club's youth teams are futsal-focused, although the club has future plans in both football and futsal.

The club had Brad Miguel as a player who later played in the World Cup qualifiers for St Vincent and The Grenadines. The team has also produced players for Crewe Alexandra, Wrexham A.F.C., and Great Britain Futsal, as well as Ruscoe's managing club Prestatyn Town. The team plans to advance into the upper tiers of both Welsh football and futsal, while also securing grants to develop Bronwens Green, their home ground.

In May 2023, the club had 80 members, and relied on fundraising efforts to support their £14,072 annual costs. In August 2023, the club played a charity match with Wrexham Police FC, raising £11,000 for the Wrexham Children's ward, with £10,000 coming from Wrexham A.F.C. co-owners Ryan Reynolds and Rob McElhenney.

The club resigned from the league in June 2023, stating an intention to focus working on reinstating their Men's Futsal side and further strengthening their current youth futsal academy. In November 2023, it announced Red Roach Records as its new sponsor.

In January 2024, the club received a donation of £5,000 from Tristan Tate, brother of Andrew Tate who faced criminal charges at the time. Following criticism on receiving the donation, the club refunded the donation.

In March 2024, Welsh actor Michael Sheen donated £5,000 to the club, as part of its £12,000 goal on GoFundMe, set up due to the club's financial difficulties.

In December 2024, nine players from FC United of Wrexham represented The National Futsal Alliance U14's Wales team in an unforgettable match against England in London. The team scored a 8-6 victory.

The club was dissolved on 27 July 2025. It was replaced on the same day by a new club FC City of Wrexham.
