= List of awards and nominations received by Glenda Jackson =

List of Glenda Jackson awards
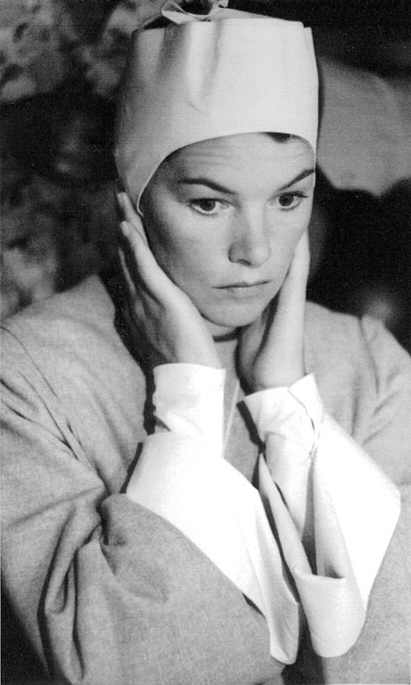
- Jackson in 1973
Award	Wins	Nominations
Academy Awards	2	4
BAFTA Awards	2	6
Golden Globe Awards	1	8
Emmy Awards	3	5
Tony Awards	1	5

Glenda Jackson was an English actress of the stage and screen. She was one of the few performers who have achieved the Triple Crown of Acting, which consists of the highest awards for film, television and theatre. She received two Academy Awards, three Emmy Awards, and a Tony Award.

For her performances in film, Jackson received two Academy Awards for Best Actress for her performances in Women in Love (1970), and A Touch of Class (1973). She also received nominations for Sunday Bloody Sunday (1971), and Hedda (1975). She also received three British Academy Film Award nominations winning for Sunday Bloody Sunday. She also received eight Golden Globe Award nominations, winning for A Touch of Class. For her work on television, she received two Primetime Emmy Awards for Outstanding Lead Actress in a Drama Series and Outstanding Single Performance by an Actress in a Leading Role for portraying Queen Elizabeth I in the BBC series Elizabeth R (1971) and an International Emmy Award for the BBC One television film Elizabeth Is Missing (2020). She also received three British Academy Television Award nominations, winning for Elizabeth Is Missing.

For her work in theatre, she received various awards, including a Tony Award, a Drama Desk Award, an Evening Standard Theatre Award, a Drama League Award and two Critics Circle Theatre Awards. She received five Tony Award nominations for her performances in Marat/Sade in 1966, Rose in 1981, Strange Interlude in 1985, and Macbeth in 1988. She won for Best Actress in a Play for the Broadway revival of Edward Albee's Three Tall Women in 2018. She also received five Laurence Olivier Award nominations for Stevie in 1977, Antony and Cleopatra in 1979, Rose in 1980, Strange Interlude in 1984, and King Lear in 2017.

== Major associations ==
=== Academy Awards ===
Year	Category	Nominated work	Result	Ref.
1971	Best Actress	Women in Love	Won	
1972	Best Actress	Sunday Bloody Sunday	Nominated	
1974	Best Actress	A Touch of Class	Won	
1976	Best Actress	Hedda	Nominated	

=== BAFTA Awards ===
Year	Category	Nominated work	Result	Ref.
British Academy Film Awards
1970	Best Actress in a Leading Role	Women in Love	Nominated	
1973	Best Actress in a Leading Role	Sunday Bloody Sunday	Won	
1975	Best Actress in a Leading Role	A Touch of Class	Nominated	
British Academy Television Awards
1970	Best Actress	Play of the Month: Howards End	Nominated	
1971	Best Actress	Elizabeth R	Nominated	
2019	Best Actress	Elizabeth is Missing	Won	

=== Emmy Awards ===
Year	Category	Nominated work	Result	Ref.
Primetime Emmy Awards
1972	Outstanding Single Performance by an Actress in a Leading Role	Elizabeth R	Nominated (Note: For the episode: "The Lion's Cub")	
1972	Outstanding Single Performance by an Actress in a Leading Role	Elizabeth R	Won (Note: For the episode: "The Shadow in the Sun")	
1972	Outstanding Continued Performance by an Actress in a Leading Role in a Dramatic Series	Elizabeth R	Won	
1982	Outstanding Lead Actress in a Limited Series or a Special	The Patricia Neal Story	Nominated	
International Emmy Awards
2020	Best Actress	Elizabeth Is Missing	Won	

=== Golden Globe Awards ===
Year	Category	Nominated work	Result	Ref.
1971	Best Actress in a Motion Picture – Drama	Women in Love	Nominated	
1972	Best Actress in a Motion Picture – Drama	Mary, Queen of Scots	Nominated	
1974	Best Actress in a Motion Picture – Musical or Comedy	A Touch of Class	Won	
1976	Best Actress in a Motion Picture – Drama	Hedda	Nominated	
1977	Best Actress in a Motion Picture – Drama	The Incredible Sarah	Nominated	
1979	Best Actress in a Motion Picture – Drama	Stevie	Nominated	
1982	Best Actress in a Miniseries or Motion Picture – Television	The Patricia Neal Story	Nominated	
1985	Best Actress in a Miniseries or Motion Picture – Television	Sakharov	Nominated	

=== Laurence Olivier Awards ===
Year	Category	Nominated work	Result	Ref.
1977	Actress of the Year in a New Play	Stevie	Nominated	
1979	Actress of the Year in a Revival	Antony and Cleopatra	Nominated	
1980	Actress of the Year in a New Play	Rose	Nominated	
1984	Actress of the Year in a Revival	Strange Interlude	Nominated	
2017	Best Actress	King Lear	Nominated	

=== Tony Awards ===
Year	Category	Nominated work	Result	Ref.
1966	Best Featured Actress in a Play	Marat/Sade	Nominated	
1981	Best Actress in a Play	Rose	Nominated	
1985	Best Actress in a Play	Strange Interlude	Nominated	
1988	Best Actress in a Play	Macbeth	Nominated	
2018	Best Actress in a Play	Three Tall Women	Won	

== Theatre awards ==
=== Critics' Circle Theatre Awards ===
Year	Category	Nominated work	Result	Ref.
1984	Best Actress	Strange Interlude	Won	
2016	Best Shakespearean Performance	King Lear	Won	

=== Drama Desk Awards ===
Year	Category	Nominated work	Result	Ref.
1988	Outstanding Actress in a Play	Macbeth	Nominated	
2018	Outstanding Actress in a Play	Three Tall Women	Won	

=== Drama League Awards ===
Year	Category	Nominated work	Result	Ref.
2018	Distinguished Performance Award	Three Tall Women	Won	

=== Evening Standard Theatre Awards ===
Year	Category	Nominated work	Result	Ref.
2017	Best Actress	King Lear	Won	

=== Outer Critics Circle Awards ===
Year	Category	Nominated work	Result	Ref.
2018	Outstanding Actress in a Play	Three Tall Women	Won	
2019	Outstanding Actress in a Play	King Lear	Nominated	

== Other awards ==
=== British Academy Scotland Awards ===
Year	Category	Nominated work	Result	Ref.
2020	Best Actress – Television	Elizabeth is Missing	Won	

=== British Independent Film Awards ===
Year	Category	Nominated work	Result	Ref.
2021	The Richard Harris Award	—N/a	Honoured	

=== Cannes Film Festival Awards ===
Year	Category	Nominated work	Result	Ref.
1983	Distinguished Service to the Cinema Award	—N/a	Won	

=== David di Donatello Awards ===
Year	Category	Nominated work	Result	Ref.
1972	Special David	Mary, Queen of Scots	Won	
1976	Best Foreign Actress	Hedda	Won (Note: Tied with Isabelle Adjani for The Story of Adele H.)	

=== Étoile de Cristal (French Film Academy) ===
Year	Category	Nominated work	Result	Ref.
1972	Best Actress	—N/a	Won	

=== Evening News Awards ===
Year	Category	Nominated work	Result	Ref.
1973	Best Actress	A Touch of Class	Won	

=== Evening Standard British Film Awards ===
Year	Category	Nominated work	Result	Ref.
1974	Best Actress	Mary, Queen of Scots	Won	
1975	Best Actress	A Touch of Class	Won	

=== Montreal Film Festival Award ===
Year	Category	Nominated work	Result	Ref.
1981	Best Actress	—N/a	Won	

=== National Board of Review Awards ===
Year	Category	Nominated work	Result	Ref.
1971	Best Actress	Women in Love	Won	
1981	Best Actress	Stevie	Won	

=== National Society of Film Critics ===
Year	Category	Nominated work	Result	Ref.
1971	Best Actress	Women in Love	Won	

=== New York Drama Critics' Circle Awards ===
Year	Category	Nominated work	Result	Ref.
1966	Best Actress	Marat/Sade	Won	

=== New York Film Critics Circle Awards ===
Year	Category	Nominated work	Result	Ref.
1970	Best Actress	Women in Love	Won	
1974	Best Actress	A Touch of Class	Nominated	
1981	Best Actress	Stevie	Won	

=== Plays and Players Awards ===
Year	Category	Nominated work	Result	Ref.
1984	Best Actress	Strange Interlude and Phedra	Won	

=== Rio de Janeiro Film Festival Awards ===
Year	Category	Nominated work	Result	Ref.
1986	Best Actress	Turtle Diary	Won	

=== San Sebastián International Film Festival ===
Year	Category	Nominated work	Result	Ref.
1973	Silver Shell for Best Actress	A Touch of Class	Won (Note: Tied with Françoise Fabian for Happy New Year (1973))	

=== Variety Awards ===
Year	Category	Nominated work	Result	Ref.
1966	Most Promising Actress	Marat/Sade	Won	

=== Variety Club of Great Britain Awards ===
Year	Category	Nominated work	Result	Ref.
1970	Best Actress	Women in Love	Won	
1971	Best Actress	Sunday Bloody Sunday	Won	
1975	Best Actress	Hedda	Won	
1979	Best Actress	House Calls, Stevie and The Class of Miss MacMichael	Won	

== See also ==
- List of Glenda Jackson performances
