= List of Glenda Jackson performances =

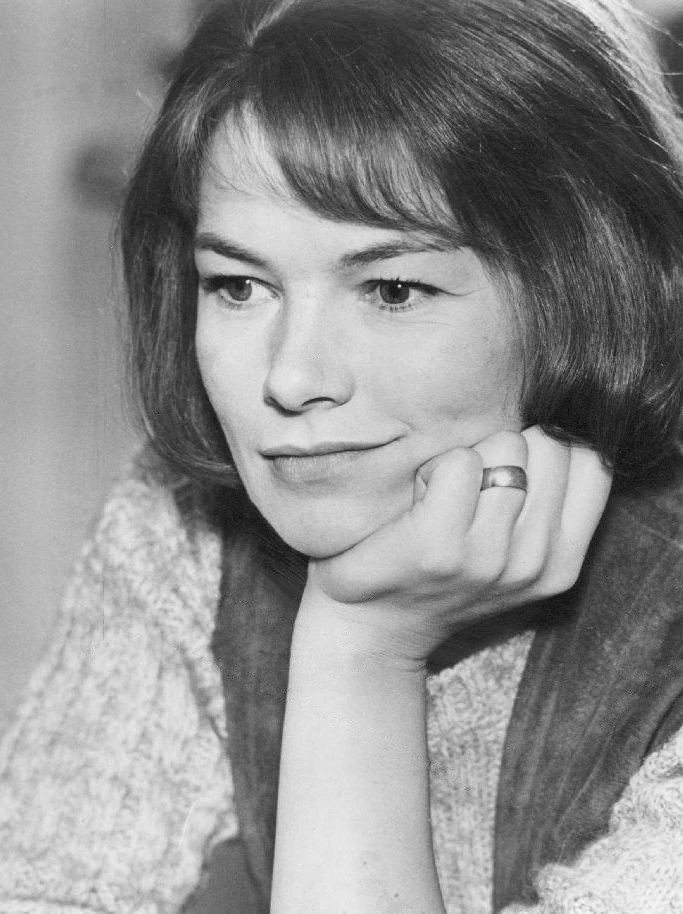
Jackson in 1971

English actress Glenda Jackson (1936 – 2023) achieved notability during her performing career, which began in 1952. She took a hiatus from acting from 1992 to 2015, after being elected as the Labour Party MP for Hampstead and Highgate. Following her departure from Parliament, she made a successful return to performing. Her acting work encompassed stage, radio, film and television. In addition, she also narrated and presented various campaign films. The list does not include works in which Jackson only appeared as an interviewee, rather than a performer, such as chat shows.

Jackson won the Triple Crown of Acting, the term used for actors who have won a competitive Academy Award, Emmy Award and Tony Award in the acting categories – the highest accolades recognised in American film, television, and theatre, respectively. She had also been nominated for, and received, numerous other awards.

== Filmography ==
=== Film ===
| Year | Title | Role | Notes | Ref. |
|---|---|---|---|---|
| 1963 | This Sporting Life | Singer at Party | Uncredited | |
| 1967 | Marat/Sade | Charlotte Corday | | |
| 1968 | Tell Me Lies: A Film About London | Guest | Character names not credited | |
| 1968 | Negatives | Vivien | | |
| 1969 | Women in Love | Gudrun Brangwen | Academy Award Winner for Best Actress in a Leading Role | |
| 1971 | The Music Lovers | Nina (Antonina Milyukova) | | |
| 1971 | Sunday Bloody Sunday | Alex Greville | | |
| 1971 | The Boy Friend | Rita Monroe | Uncredited | |
| 1971 | Mary, Queen of Scots | Queen Elizabeth | | |
| 1972 | The Triple Echo | Alice | | |
| 1973 | Bequest to the Nation | Lady Hamilton | AKA The Nelson Affair | |
| 1973 | A Touch of Class | Vickie Allessio | Academy Award Winner for Best Actress in a Leading Role (second win) | |
| 1973 | The Devil Is a Woman | Sister Geraldine | AKA Il Sorriso del grande tentatore | |
| 1975 | The Maids | Solange | | |
| 1975 | The Romantic Englishwoman | Elizabeth Fielding | | |
| 1975 | Hedda | Hedda | | |
| 1976 | The Incredible Sarah | Sarah Bernhardt | | |
| 1976 | Nasty Habits | Alexandra | | |
| 1978 | House Calls | Ann Atkinson | | |
| 1978 | Stevie | Stevie Smith | | |
| 1978 | The Class of Miss MacMichael | Conor MacMichael | | |
| 1979 | Lost and Found | Patricia Brittenham | | |
| 1980 | Health | Isabella Garnell | | |
| 1980 | Hopscotch | Isobel | | |
| 1982 | The Return of the Soldier | Margaret Grey | | |
| 1982 | Giro City | Sophie | Made for Channel 4, but released in cinemas prior to the broadcast. | |
| 1985 | Turtle Diary | Neaera Duncan | | |
| 1987 | Beyond Therapy | Charlotte Wallace | | |
| 1988 | Business as Usual | Babs Flynn | | |
| 1988 | Salome's Last Dance | Herodias / Lady Alice | | |
| 1989 | The Rainbow | Anna Brangwen | | |
| 1989 | Doombeach | Miss | | |
| 1990 | King of the Wind | Queen Caroline | | |
| 2021 | Mothering Sunday | Older Jane Fairchild | | |
| 2023 | The Great Escaper | Irene Jordan | Posthumous release | |

=== Television ===
| Year | Title | Role | Notes | Ref. |
|---|---|---|---|---|
| 1957 | ITV Play of the Week | Iris Jones | Episode: "A Voice in Vision" | |
| 1961 | ITV Play of the Week | Jurywoman | Episode: "Dr Everyman's Hour" | |
| 1963 | Z-Cars | Hospital Nurse / WPC Fernley | 2 episodes | |
| 1965 | The Wednesday Play | Cathy | Episode: "Horror of Darkness" | |
| 1967 | Half Hour Story | Claire Foley | Episode: "Which of These Two Ladies Is He Married To?" | |
| 1968 | The Wednesday Play | Julie | Episode: "Let's Murder Vivaldi" | |
| 1968 | Armchair Theatre | Ruth | Episode: "Home Movies" | |
| 1969 | ITV Sunday Night Theatre | Marina Palek | Episode: "Salve Regina" | |
| 1970 | Review | Reader | Reader of extracts from A Pagan Place by Edna O'Brien | |
| 1970 | Play of the Month | Margaret Schlegel | Episode: "Howards End" | |
| 1971 | Elizabeth R | Elizabeth I | TV miniseries; 6 episodes | |
| 1971 | Show of the Week | Guest | Episode: "The Morecambe and Wise Show" | |
| 1971 | Morecambe and Wise Christmas Show | Guest | | |
| 1972 | Morecambe and Wise Christmas Show | Guest | | |
| 1973 | Full House | Reader ("The House that Jack Built") | | |
| 1977 | Night of 100 Stars | Guest | | |
| 1979 | Christmas With Eric and Ernie | Guest | Christmas special of the Morecambe and Wise Show | |
| 1980 | The Morecambe and Wise Christmas Show | Guest | | |
| 1980 | The Muppet Show | Special Guest Star | Episode: "Glenda Jackson" | |
| 1981 | The Patricia Neal Story | Patricia Neal | TV film | |
| 1982 | The Morecambe and Wise Christmas Show | Guest | | |
| 1984 | Sakharov | Yelena Bonner (Sakharova) | TV film | |
| 1988 | American Playhouse | Nina Leeds | Episode: "Strange Interlude" | |
| 1989 | Doombeach | Teacher | | |
| 1990 | Carol & Company | Dr. Doris Kruber | Episode: "Kruber Alert" | |
| 1990 | T.Bag's Christmas Ding Dong | Vanity Bag | TV film | |
| 1991 | A Murder of Quality | Ailsa Brimley | TV film | |
| 1991 | The House of Bernarda Alba | Bernarda | TV film | |
| 1992 | The Secret Life of Arnold Bax | Harriet Cohen | TV film | |
| 2019 | Elizabeth Is Missing | Maud | TV film | |

=== Short films ===
| Year | Title | Role | Notes | Ref. |
|---|---|---|---|---|
| 1979 | Build Me a World | Narrator | For International Year of the Child | |
| 1981 | Stop Polio | Commentator | Sponsored by Save the Children | |
| 1982 | Save the Children in the Sudan | Commentator | Sponsored by Save the Children | |
| 1982 | Let Poland Be Poland | On-screen participant | Sponsored by the International Communications Agency | |
| 1986 | Man-Made Famine | Commentator/Narrator | Sponsored by Channel 4 | |
| 1986 | The Labour Party | | Party political broadcast for the Labour Party | |
| 1987 | Facing South | Commentator | Sponsored by Voluntary Service Overseas | |
| 1988 | The One Child Family | Presenter/Narrator | Co-produced by Oxfam | |
| 1988 | Yunnan | Presenter | | |
| 1990 | Death on Delivery | Commentator | Made in association with the Campaign Against Arms Trade | |
| 1992 | Rise Up, Women! The Suffragette Campaign in London | Narrator | Sponsored by the Museum of London | |
| 2022 | The Microcosm | Narrator | | |

== Stage ==
| Year | Title | Role | Venue | Ref. |
|---|---|---|---|---|
| 1952 | Mystery of Greenfingers | | YMCA Players, Hoylake | |
| 1954 | Nothing But the Truth | Ethel | YMCA Players, Hoylake | |
| 1954 | To Kill a Cat | Margaret Fenwick | YMCA Players, Hoylake | |
| 1956 | The Caucasian Chalk Circle | Chorus | Vanbrugh Theatre, London | |
| 1956 | The Frogs | | | |
| 1956 | Pygmalion | Eliza Doolittle | St Pancras Town Hall | |
| 1956 | The Winter's Tale | Paulina | | |
| 1957 | Doctor in the House | | Connaught Theatre, Worthing | |
| 1957 | Separate Tables | Jean Stratton / Jean Tanner | Queen's Theatre, Hornchurch | |
| 1957 | Rum Punch | | Queen's Theatre, Hornchurch | |
| 1957 | Ring For Catty | | Queen's Theatre, Hornchurch | |
| 1957 | The White Sheep of the Family | | Queen's Theatre, Hornchurch | |
| 1957 | All Kinds of Men | Ruby | Arts Theatre, London | |
| 1958 | An Inspector Calls | | New Theatre, Crewe | |
| 1958 | My Three Angels | | New Theatre, Crewe | |
| 1958 | Macadam and Eve | | New Theatre, Crewe | |
| 1958 | Trial and Error | | New Theatre, Crewe | |
| 1958 | Book of the Month | | New Theatre, Crewe | |
| 1958 | Jane Eyre | Jane Eyre | New Theatre, Crewe | |
| 1958 | The Glass Menagerie | | New Theatre, Crewe | |
| 1958 | Burdalane | | New Theatre, Crewe | |
| 1958 | Old Tyme Music Hall | | New Theatre, Crewe | |
| 1958 | A Girl Named Sadie | | UK tour | |
| 1961 | Fools Rush In | Pam | Dundee Repertory Theatre, Dundee | |
| 1961 | In Search of Happiness | Marina | Dundee Repertory Theatre, Dundee | |
| 1961 | The Durable Element | Katherine | Dundee Repertory Theatre, Dundee | |
| 1961 | The Kitchen | | Royal Court Theatre, London | |
| 1962 | The Idiot | Nastasya Filippovna | Lyric Theatre, Hammersmith | |
| 1962 | Come Back With Diamonds | | Lyric Theatre, Hammersmith | |
| 1962 | Guilty Party | | Watford Palace Theatre, Watford | |
| 1962 | Double Yolk | | Watford Palace Theatre, Watford | |
| 1963 | Alfie | Siddie | Mermaid Theatre, London; then the Duchess Theatre, London | |
| 1964 | Theatre of Cruelty | Christine Keeler / Jacqueline Kennedy | London Academy of Music and Dramatic Art, London | |
| 1964 | The Screens | Kadidja | Donmar Warehouse, London | |
| 1964 | Marat/Sade | Charlotte Corday | Aldwych Theatre, London | |
| 1964 | The Jew of Malta | Bellamira | Aldwych Theatre, London | |
| 1965 | Love's Labour's Lost | Princess of France | Royal Shakespeare Theatre, Stratford-upon-Avon | |
| 1965 | Squire Puntila and His Servant Matti | Eva | Aldwych Theatre, London | |
| 1965 | Hamlet | Ophelia | Royal Shakespeare Theatre, Stratford-upon-Avon | |
| 1965 | The Investigation | Witness 4 | Aldwych Theatre, London | |
| 1965 | Marat/Sade | Charlotte Corday | Martin Beck Theatre, New York | |
| 1966 | US | | Aldwych Theatre, London | |
| 1967 | Three Sisters | Masha | Royal Court Theatre, London | |
| 1967 | Fanghorn | Tamara Fanghorn | Fortune Theatre, London | |
| 1973 | Collaborators | Katherine Winter | Duchess Theatre, London | |
| 1974 | The Maids | Solange | Greenwich Theatre, London | |
| 1975 | Hedda Gabler | Hedda Tesman | Richmond Theatre, London; then world tour (Australia, USA, Canada), and Aldwych Theatre, London | |
| 1976 | The White Devil | Vittoria Corombona | The Old Vic, London | |
| 1977 | Stevie | Stevie Smith | Vaudeville Theatre, London | |
| 1978 | Antony and Cleopatra | Cleopatra | Royal Shakespeare Theatre, Stratford-upon-Avon | |
| 1979 | Antony and Cleopatra | Cleopatra | Aldwych Theatre, London | |
| 1980 | Rose | Rose | Duke of York's Theatre, London | |
| 1981 | Rose | Rose | Cort Theatre, New York | |
| 1982 | Summit Conference | Eva Braun | Lyric Theatre, Hammersmith | |
| 1983 | Great and Small | Lotte | British tour; then Vaudeville Theatre, London | |
| 1984 | Strange Interlude | Nina Leeds | Previews in Croydon and Nottingham; then Duke of York's Theatre, London | |
| 1984 | Phedra | Phedra | The Old Vic, London | |
| 1985 | Strange Inderlude | Nina Leeds | Nederlander Theatre, New York | |
| 1985 | Phedra | Phedra | Aldwych Theatre, London | |
| 1986 | Across from the Garden of Allah | Barbara | Tour, then Comedy Theatre, London | |
| 1986 | The House of Bernarda Alba | Bernarda | Lyric Theatre, Hammersmith | |
| 1987 | The House of Bernarda Alba | Bernarda | Globe Theatre, London | |
| 1988 | Macbeth | Lady Macbeth | Canada and US tour; then Mark Hellinger Theatre, New York | |
| 1989 | Who's Afraid of Virginia Woolf? | Martha | Doolittle Theatre, Los Angeles | |
| 1990 | Scenes from an Execution | Galactia | Almeida Theatre, London | |
| 1990 | Mother Courage | Mother Courage | Citizens Theatre, Glasgow; then Mermaid Theatre, London | |
| 1991 | Mourning Becomes Electra | Christine Mannon | Citizens Theatre, Glasgow | |
| 2016 | King Lear | King Lear | The Old Vic, London | |
| 2018 | Three Tall Women | A | John Golden Theatre, New York | |
| 2019 | King Lear | King Lear | Cort Theatre, New York | |

== Audio ==
=== Radio ===
| Year | Title | Role | Notes | Ref. |
|---|---|---|---|---|
| 1964 | Ars Longa Vita Brevis | Roxana, his wife | BBC Network Three | |
| 1965 | The Investigation | The Witnesses (part of ensemble) | BBC Network Three | |
| 1967 | Love in a Cupboard | Regina Olsen | BBC Network Three | |
| 1967 | The Representative of the Poem | Emily Dickinson | BBC Radio 3 poetry reading | |
| 1969 | Afternoon Theatre | Christa | BBC Radio 4 episode: "The Road from Ruin by Frederick Benedict" | |
| 1969 | Danton's Death | Marion | BBC Radio 3 | |
| 1976 | Emily Dickinson | Reader | BBC Radio 3 | |
| 1978 | The Monday Play | Stevie | BBC Radio 4 episode: "Stevie" | |
| 1980 | Woman's Hour | Reader | BBC Radio 4 serial: Daughters of the Vicar by D. H. Lawrence | |
| 1980 | The Yellow Wallpaper | Reader | BBC Radio 3 | |
| 1980 | The Prague Trial 79 | Reader | BBC Radio 3 | |
| 1981 | You Will Hear Thunder | Anna Akhmatova | BBC Radio 3 | |
| 1984 | Scenes From an Execution | Galactia | BBC Radio 3 | |
| 1988 | The Wednesday Feature | Reader | BBC Radio 4 episode: "The Memory of Troy" | |
| 1994 | With Great Pleasure | Reader | BBC Radio 4 episode | |
| 2015 | Blood, Sex and Money by Emile Zola | Dide | BBC Radio 4: Three series (27 episodes; 2015–2016) | |
| 2017 | Drama | The Soul | BBC Radio 4 episode: "The Progress of the Soul of Lizzie Calvin" | |
| 2018 | Drama | Narrator | BBC Radio 4 episode: "Unmade Movies, Alexander MacKendrick's Mary Queen of Scots" | |
| 2019 | Drama | Narrator / Mrs Whitaker | BBC Radio 4 episode: "Neil Gaiman's 'Chivalry'" | |
| 2020 | Fault Lines: Money, Sex and Blood | Constance | BBC Radio 4: Three series (18 episodes; 2020–2022) | |
| 2020 | Drama | Dame Edith | BBC Radio 4 episode: "Edith Sitwell in Scarborough" | |

=== Recordings ===
| Year | Title | Role | Notes | Issue | Ref. |
|---|---|---|---|---|---|
| 1962 | King Richard III | Lady Anne | The Shakespeare Recording Society | Caedmon SRS 223S (4-LP box set) | |
| 1963 | Jean Genet: The Balcony | Girl | The Theatre Recording Society Production Folio | Caedmon TRS 316 M / S (mono / stereo; 3-LP box set) | |
| 1967 | Marat / Sade - Original Motion Picture Soundtrack Music | | | Caedmon / United Artists Records UAL 4153 / UAS 5153 (mono / stereo) | |
| 1968 | No Exit | Inez | The Theatre Recording Society | Caedmon TRS 327 (2-LP set box set) | |
| 1968 | Murder in the Cathedral | Chorus of Women | | Caedmon TRS 330 (2-LP box set) | |
| 1975 | The Secret Garden | Narrator | Abridged novel by Frances Hodgson Burnett, read by Glenda Jackson, music by Kenny Clayton. | Argo ZSW 543/544/545/546 (4-LP box set) | |
| 1976 | The Glenda Jackson Story Book | Reader | | Argo ZSW 559 | |
| 1976 | The Glenda Jackson Story Book Vol. 2 | Reader | | Argo ZSW 560 | |
| 1976 | The Mind Of Emily Dickinson | Reader | Readings from the letters and poetry of Emily Dickinson by Glenda Jackson. | Argo ZSW 600/601 (2-LP set) | |
| 1978 | Stravinsky: The Soldier's Tale | Narrator | With Rudolf Nureyev and Micheál Mac Liammóir. Ensemble directed by Gennady Zalkowitsch. | Argo ZNF 15 (also issued on cassette: Argo KZNC 15) | |
| 1978 | Little Women by Louisa M. Alcott | Reader | Music written and directed by Kenny Clayton | Argo 596/597/598 (3-LP set) | |
| 1978 | Glenda Jackson Reads Stevie Smith | Reader | | Argo ZSW 608 | |
| 1979 | Stevie | Reader | Poems by Stevie Smith read by Glenda Jackson and Trevor Howard. From the soundtrack of the film Stevie. | CBS 70165 | |
| 1983 | Your Favorite Poems: Volume Two | Reader | Selection of poems read by British theatre actors | Newman / Argo 20080 | |
| 1984 | Noel Edmonds Presents Listen With Mother | Reader | 'The Crotchety Tooth' by Margaret Hopkins | BBC Records REC 525 / BBC Cassettes ZCM 525 | |
| 1989 | Madame Bovary by Gustave Flaubert | Narrator | | Dove Books-On-Tape, Phoenix Books | |
| 1993 | Princess and the Goblin by George MacDonald | Narrator | | Dove Kids | |
| 1994 | Persuasion by Jane Austen | Narrator | | Dove Audio, Phoenix Books | |
| 1995 | The Great Speeches: A Celebration in Words and Music by William Shakespeare | Reader | A White Rose Globe Theatre Production | Penguin Classics / Penguin Audiobooks PEN 290 | |
| 1996 | Aesop's Fables (Volume Three) | Narrator | Performed by various readers | Dove Entertainment | |
| 1996 | Sense and Sensibility by Jane Austen | Narrator | | Dove Audio 81820 | |
| 1996 | The Prince's Choice: A Personal Selection from Shakespeare | Reader | Performed by various readers | Highbridge Audio | |
| 1996 | Aesop's Fables (Volume Four) | Reader | Performed by various readers | Dove Books | |
| 1997 | Northanger Abbey by Jane Austen | Narrator | | Dove Audio | |
| 1997 | Fifty Poems of Emily Dickinson | Reader | Anthology read by various performers | Dove Audio/Phoenix Books | |
| 1997 | The Poetry of the Romantics | Reader | Performed by various readers | Dove Audio | |
| 1998 | The Greatest American Poetry | Reader | Performed by various readers | Dove Audio | |
| 1999 | Seven Ages - An Anthology of Poetry With Music | Reader | Glenda Jackson reads 'The Victory' by Anne Stevenson, 'Full Fathom Five' by William Shakespeare, 'Echo' by Christina Rossetti and 'Sonnet 18' by William Shakespeare | Naxos NA218912 | |
