= Black and Scottish =

2019 documentary film

Black and Scottish is a documentary film directed by Stewart Kyasimire. Released in 2019, the film explores the experiences of prominent black Scots across different generations, aiming to answer the question: What does it mean to be black and Scottish?

== Synopsis ==
The documentary features a diverse range of black Scots from different generations and backgrounds, sharing their experiences of growing up and living in Scotland. Kyasimire, who grew up in Glasgow during the 1980s, was inspired to create the film to explore the identity issues his mixed-race daughter might face.

== Production ==
It was produced by Tern TV and commissioned by BBC Scotland.

Key Themes Identity and Belonging

Interviewees describe the dichotomy of being part of two cultures—black and Scottish—and not feeling fully accepted by either. Ncuti Gatwa, known for his role in Netflix's Sex Education, shares his experiences as a Rwandan-Scot, emphasizing the importance of self-identity.

Representation

The film highlights the scarcity of black representation in Scotland. According to the 2011 Census, while 13% of Londoners identified as black, the percentage in Scotland was under 1%. Many interviewees express feeling isolated due to the lack of role models who looked like them.

Generational Perspectives

Black and Scottish features interviews with individuals from different age groups, providing a comprehensive view of the black community's experiences across time.

Notable Interviewees

Ncuti Gatwa: The breakout star from "Sex Education" discusses his journey as a Rwandan-Scot and the challenges he faced growing up.

The Cutkelvins: X Factor semi-finalists who share their perspectives on identity and cultural duality.

Geoff Palmer OBE: Scotland's first black professor, whose achievements and insights contribute to the film's narrative.

== Legacy ==
Kyasimire dedicates Black and Scottish to his 8-year-old daughter, Yasmin, and her generation. By amplifying black voices and experiences, the film aims to foster understanding, representation, and acceptance.
