= Radio Times's TV 100 =

Radio Times's TV 100 is an annual listing that recognizes "television talent[s] who have had an exceptional 12 months, exciting the industry and viewers alike". It was introduced by Radio Times in 2017. A list of 100 creative talents who have significantly contributed to the television industry in the past year is usually created by a panel of TV professionals such as channel controllers, commissioners, production executives, writers, and producers. Finally, the listing is ranked by a panel comprising Radio Times's editors. Jodie Whittaker topped the inaugural list in 2017.

== Winners ==
TV 100 winners
Year	Person	Ref.
2017	Jodie Whittaker	
2018	Olivia Colman	
2019	Phoebe Waller-Bridge	
2021	Russell T Davies	
2022	Ncuti Gatwa	
2023	Mr Bates vs The Post Office - ensemble	
2024	Richard Gadd	

== See also ==
- Radio Times's Most Powerful People – a similar set of lists published by Radio Times from 2003 to 2005
