= Michael Roberts (fashion journalist) =

British fashion journalist (1947–2023)

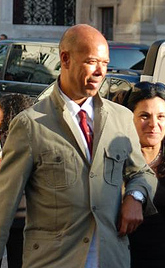
- Roberts in 2006
- Born: 2 October 1947; Aylesbury, Buckinghamshire, England
- Died: 3 April 2023 (aged 75); Taormina, Sicily, Italy
- Occupation: Fashion journalist

Michael Roy Roberts CBE (2 October 1947 – 3 April 2023) was a British fashion journalist. He was the fashion and style director of Vanity Fair magazine. He worked as fashion director for The New Yorker and The Sunday Times, style director and art director for Tatler, design director of British Vogue, Paris editor of Vanity Fair, and editor of Boulevard magazine.

Roberts also worked as a fashion photographer and illustrator, contributing images to publications including Vanity Fair; L'Uomo Vogue; British, Italian, French, American, Chinese, Brazilian, and Japanese Vogue; The Sunday Times; and The Independent on Sunday. He published four books of his illustrations.

Roberts was appointed Commander of the Order of the British Empire (CBE) in the 2022 New Year Honours for services to fashion. He died on 3 April 2023, at the age of 75, in Taormina, Sicily, where he lived.

Rwandan-Scottish actor Ncuti Gatwa will portray Roberts in The Queen of Fashion, an upcoming biographical film starring Andrea Riseborough as Isabella Blow.
