= The Queen of Fashion =

Upcoming biographical film

- Directed by: Alex Marx
- Written by: Alex Marx
- Produced by: Alex Marx; Elise Freeman; Andrea Riseborough
- Starring: Andrea Riseborough; Ncuti Gatwa; Richard E. Grant; Fionn O'Shea; Michelle Dockery; Joe Cole; Dane DeHaan; Emily Beecham; Stacy Martin; Miranda Richardson
- Cinematography: Nicola Daley
- Edited by: Emma McCleave
- Music by: Laura Mvula
- Production company: Mystic Dawn Media
- Countries: United States; United Kingdom
- Language: English

The Queen of Fashion is an upcoming biographical drama film about the life of the fashion stylist Isabella Blow written, directed and produced by Alex Marx.

== Cast ==
- Andrea Riseborough as Isabella Blow
- Richard E. Grant as Evelyn Delves Broughton
- Fionn O'Shea as Philip Treacy
- Joe Cole as Alexander McQueen
- Dane DeHaan as Detmar Blow
- Emily Beecham as Lucy Birley
- Stacy Martin as Daphne Guinness
- Ncuti Gatwa as Michael Roberts
- Miranda Richardson as Helen Delves Broughton
- Michelle Dockery as Alexandra Shulman
- Sebastian de Souza as Stefan Bartlett

== Production ==
It was announced in May 2024 that Andrea Riseborough was set to star in and produce the film, with Emilia Clarke, Hayley Atwell, Richard E. Grant and Fionn O'Shea also cast. This will mark Alex Marx's feature film directorial debut, and Stephen Goldblatt was to serve as cinematographer. Rocket Science, which was handling sales for the film, identified Joe Cole, Dane DeHaan, Emily Beecham and Stacy Martin as part of the cast, though Clarke and Atwell were no longer included among the cast. In June 2025, Ncuti Gatwa was announced to be part of the cast. In August, it was announced filming had concluded. Clarke and Atwell were confirmed to have exited the film, with their roles recast with Martin as Daphne Guinness and Michelle Dockery as Alexandra Shulman. Miranda Richardson was also added to the cast.
