= David di Donatello for Best Foreign Actress =

Former annual Italian film award

The David di Donatello for Best Foreign Actress (Italian: David di Donatello per la migliore attrice straniera) is a category in the David di Donatello Awards, described as "Italy's answer to the Oscars". It was awarded by the Accademia del Cinema Italiano (ACI, Academy of Italian Cinema) to recognize outstanding efforts on the part of non-Italian film actresses during the year preceding the ceremony. The award was created during the second edition of the ceremony, in 1957, and cancelled after the 1996 event. The award was not granted in 1958.

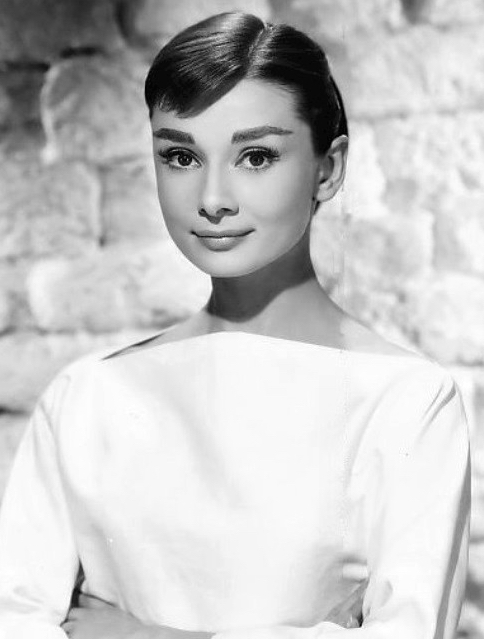
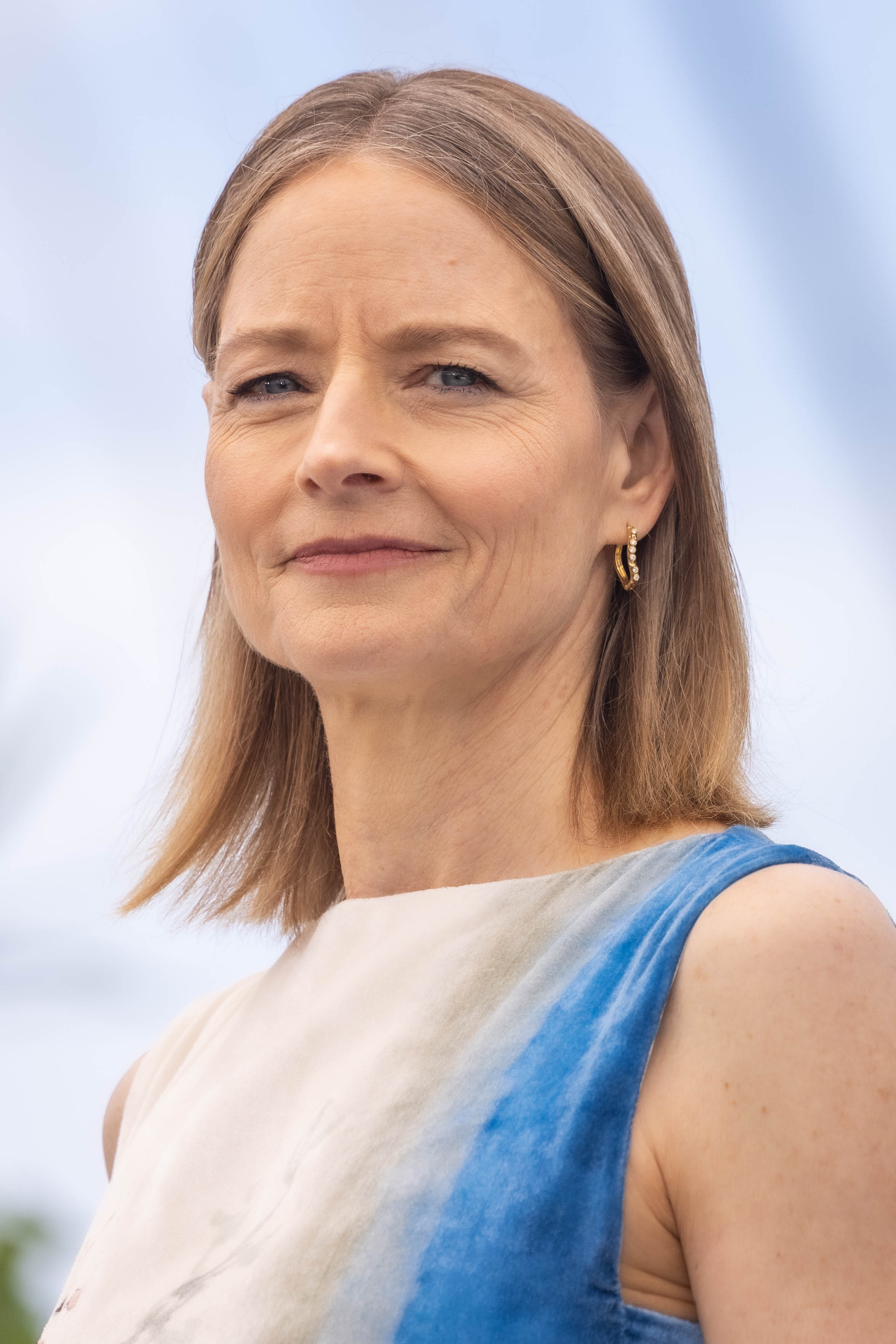
Audrey Hepburn and Jodie Foster, with three awards each, are the record-holders in this category.

== Winners ==
=== 1950s ===
1957

- Ingrid Bergman – Anastasia

1958

- Marilyn Monroe – The Prince and the Showgirl

1959

- Deborah Kerr – Separate Tables

=== 1960s ===
1960

- Audrey Hepburn – The Nun's Story

1961

- Brigitte Bardot – The Truth

1962

- Audrey Hepburn – Breakfast at Tiffany's

1963

- Geraldine Page – Sweet Bird of Youth

1964

- Shirley MacLaine – Irma la Douce

1965

- Audrey Hepburn – My Fair Lady

1966

- Julie Andrews – The Sound of Music

1967

- Julie Christie – Doctor Zhivago (ex aequo)
- Elizabeth Taylor – The Taming of the Shrew

1968

- Faye Dunaway – Bonnie and Clyde (ex aequo)
- Katharine Hepburn – Guess Who's Coming to Dinner

1969

- Barbra Streisand – Funny Girl (ex aequo)
- Mia Farrow – Rosemary's Baby

=== 1970s ===
1970

- Liza Minnelli – The Sterile Cuckoo

1971

- Ali MacGraw – Love Story

1972

- Elizabeth Taylor – X Y & Zee

1973

- Liza Minnelli – Cabaret

1974

- Barbra Streisand – The Way We Were (ex aequo)
- Tatum O'Neal – Paper Moon

1975

- Liv Ullmann – Scenes from a Marriage

1976

- Isabelle Adjani – The Story of Adele H. (ex aequo)
- Glenda Jackson – Hedda

1977

- Annie Girardot – Cours après moi que je t'attrape (ex aequo)
- Faye Dunaway – Network

1978

- Jane Fonda – Julia (ex aequo)
- Simone Signoret – The Life Before Us

1979

- Ingrid Bergman – Autumn Sonata (ex aequo)
- Liv Ullmann – Autumn Sonata

=== 1980s ===
1980

- Isabelle Huppert – The Lacemaker

1981

- Catherine Deneuve – The Last Metro

1982

- Diane Keaton – Reds

1983

- Julie Andrews – Victor/Victoria

1984

- Shirley MacLaine – Terms of Endearment

1985

- Meryl Streep – Falling in Love

1986

- Meryl Streep – Out of Africa

1987

- Norma Aleandro – The Official Story

1988

- Cher – Moonstruck

1989

- Jodie Foster – The Accused

=== 1990s ===
1990

- Jessica Tandy – Driving Miss Daisy

1991

- Anne Parillaud – La Femme Nikita

1992

- Jodie Foster – The Silence of the Lambs

1993

- Emmanuelle Béart – A Heart in Winter (ex aequo)
- Tilda Swinton – Orlando (ex aequo)
- Emma Thompson – Howards End

1994

- Emma Thompson – The Remains of the Day

1995

- Jodie Foster – Nell

1996

- Susan Sarandon – Dead Man Walking
