= 2020 British Academy Scotland Awards =

- Date: 8 December 2020
- Site: Online
- Hosted by: Edith Bowman

Television coverage
- Network: Streaming webcast

The 30th British Academy Scotland Awards were held on 8 December 2020 online, honouring the best Scottish film and television productions of 2019. The nominations were announced by Edith Bowman on 21 October 2020.

== Nominees ==
Best News & Current Affairs	Best Director (Fiction)
The War Next Door: Scotland and the Troubles; The Nine; Scotland's Lockdown (Disclosure)	Robert McKillop - Guilt; Lynsey Miller - Deadwater Fell; Aisling Walsh - Elizabeth Is Missing
Best Entertainment	Best Factual Series
Scot Squad: The Chief's Election Interviews; Selling Scotland; Test Drive	Murder Trial: The Disappearance of Margaret Fleming; Darren McGarvey's Scotland; Frankie Boyle's Tour of Scotland
Best Actor in Television	Best Actress in Television
Ncuti Gatwa - Sex Education; Mark Bonnar - Guilt; Jamie Sives - Guilt	Glenda Jackson - Elizabeth Is Missing; Lois Chimimba - Group; Mirren Mack - The Nest
Best Writer Film/Television	Best Television Scripted
Paul Laverty - Sorry We Missed You; Andrea Gibb - Elizabeth Is Missing; Neil Forsyth - Guilt	Guilt - Happy Tramp North/BBC Scotland; Deadwater Fell - kudos/Channel 4; Elizabeth Is Missing - Andrea Gibb, Aisling Walsh, Sarah Brown, Chrissy Skinns
Best Director (Factual)	Best Specialist Factual
Matt Pinder - Murder Trial: The Disappearance of Margaret Fleming; Stewart Kyaasimire - Black and Scottish; John MacLaverty - The Battle of Skye Bridge	Greg Davies: Lookin for Kes - James Dames, Richard Bright, David Arthur, Tim Niel; Climategate: Science of a Scandal - Ross Harper, Steve O'Hagan, Dave Clark; Miss World 1970: Beauty Queens and Bedlam - Hannah Berryman, Lizzie Webster, Patrick Smith, Richard Bright
Best Single Documentary	Best Short Film & Animation
Being Gail Porter - Harry Bell, Anne-Claire Pilley; The Battle of Skye Bridge - Harry Bell, John MacLaverty, Noel Nelis, Cara Maclean; Dooman - Darren Hercher, David Arthur, Karen Emsley	Betty - Will Anderson; The Last Train - Ross Hogg, Sean Mulvenna; The Motorist - Ciaran Lyons, Beth Allan, David Liddell, Chris Lyons
Best Features	Best Game
A Country Life for Half The Price; Location, Location, Location; Scotland's Home of the Year	Autonauts; Cloudpunk; Dead End Job
Audience Award
Outlander; Black & Scottish; Guilt; Murder Trial: The Disappearance of Margaret Fleming; The Nest; River City

=== Outstanding Contribution to Television ===
Stanley Baxter

=== Outstanding Contribution to Craft ===
Phyllis Ironside

== See also ==
- 73rd British Academy Film Awards
- 92nd Academy Awards
- 26th Screen Actors Guild Awards
