= Ncuti Gatwa =

Rwandan-Scottish actor (born 1992)

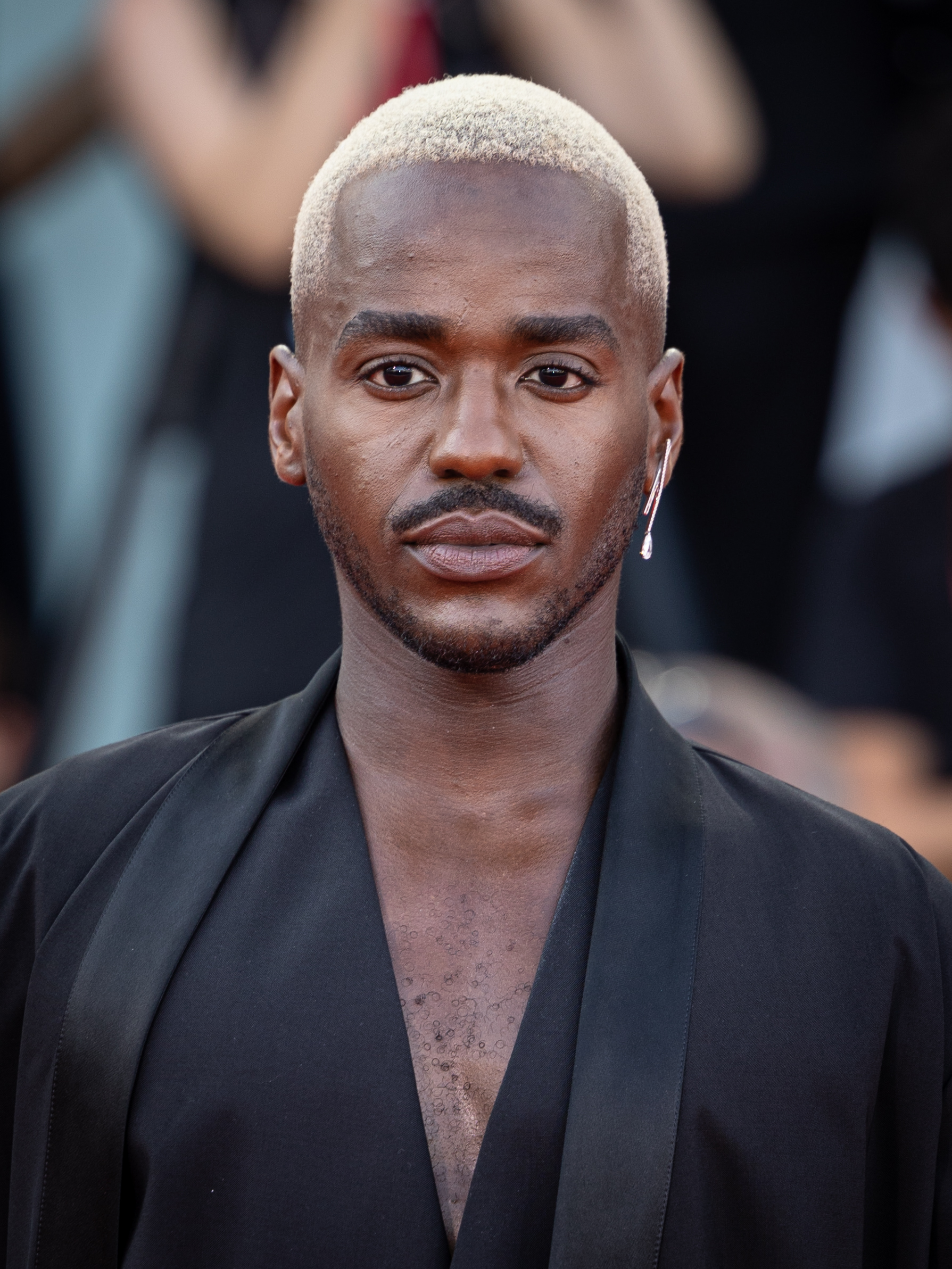
- Gatwa in 2024
- Born: 15 October 1992 (age 34); Nyarugenge, Kigali, Rwanda
- Citizenship: Rwanda; United Kingdom
- Education: Royal Conservatoire of Scotland (BA); University of Glasgow (DMus)
- Occupation: Actor
- Years active: 2013–present

Mizero Ncuti Gatwa (English: /ˈ(n)ʃuːti ˈɡætwɑː/ (N)SHOO-tee GAT-wah; (Note: Gatwa has said he pronounced Ncuti as /ˈʃuːti/ until his mother told him when he was 26 years old that the correct pronunciation was /ˈnʃuːti/. However, he has continued to use /ˈʃuːti/ when introducing himself in English. Its pronunciation in Kinyarwanda is [nʃùtí].) born 15 October 1992) is a Rwandan-Scottish actor. He is best known for playing Eric Effiong in the Netflix series Sex Education (2019–2023) and the Fifteenth Doctor in the BBC series Doctor Who (2023–2025). He won the 2020 BAFTA Scotland Award for Best Actor in Television for the former role, and the 2024 BAFTA Cymru Award for Best Actor for the latter.

Gatwa began his career on stage at the Dundee Repertory Theatre and was nominated for an Ian Charleson Award for his performance as Mercutio in a 2014 production of Romeo & Juliet at HOME arts centre. For his breakout role in Sex Education, Gatwa earned three consecutive British Academy Television Award nominations for Best Male Comedy Performance. In 2022, he became the first non-white actor to be cast as the lead character of the Doctor in Doctor Who. His film appearances include Barbie (2023) and The Roses (2025).

== Early life and education ==
Mizero Ncuti Gatwa was born in the Nyarugenge District of Kigali, Rwanda, on 15 October 1992, to Rwandan parents, Josephine and Tharcisse Gatwa. His father is a journalist from Rwanda's Karongi District. Gatwa has two older siblings.

Gatwa's family fled from Rwanda during the 1994 genocide against the Tutsi and settled in Scotland. They lived in Oxgangs in Edinburgh, and moved to Dunfermline when he was 15. Gatwa attended Boroughmuir High School and Dunfermline High School before moving to Glasgow to study at the Royal Conservatoire of Scotland, graduating with a Bachelor of Arts in Acting in 2013. While studying, he worked at the LGBTQ+ club The Polo Lounge, handing out flyers and later becoming a go-go dancer at The Polo Lounge's sister club. The Conservatoire awarded him an honorary doctorate at the class of 2022 graduation ceremony.

== Career ==
=== 2013–2022: Early stage work and breakthrough with Sex Education ===
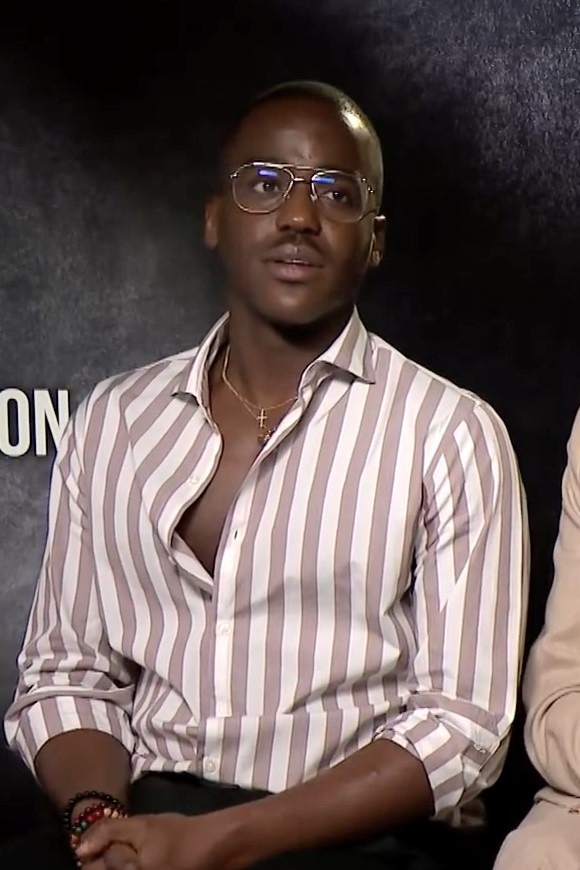
Gatwa in 2019

After graduating, Gatwa was granted a position in the Dundee Repertory Theatre acting graduation scheme where he performed in several productions including David Greig's Victoria. Around this time, Gatwa was attacked by three strangers in the street who fractured his jaw; it is now made with titanium. His first experience on a professional set was when he filmed a brief role in the 2014 BBC Scotland sitcom Bob Servant. In 2014, Gatwa received a Commendation at the Ian Charleson Awards for his performance of Mercutio in Romeo and Juliet at HOME, Manchester.

In 2015, he appeared in the miniseries Stonemouth, an adaptation of Iain Banks's 2012 novel of the same name. That same year, he performed in the Kneehigh Theatre's production of 946: The Amazing Story of Adolphus Tips, which was adapted from Michael Morpurgo's The Amazing Story of Adolphus Tips, about a large-scale rehearsal for the D-Day landings in 1944 that resulted in numerous fatalities. Gatwa played Demetrius in the 2016 production of A Midsummer Night's Dream at Shakespeare's Globe directed by Emma Rice.

In 2019, Gatwa had his breakout role as Eric Effiong in the Netflix comedy-drama series Sex Education. For five months prior to this casting, he had been homeless after running out of savings, and had couch surfed among friends whilst working as a temporary employee at Harrods. Gatwa received praise for his portrayal of Eric from critics, particularly for how his character was not relegated to the cliché of "gay or Black best friend slash sidekick stock character". He earned numerous accolades for the role, including a BAFTA Scotland Award for Best Actor in Television in 2020, and three BAFTA Television Award nominations for Best Male Comedy Performance in 2020, 2021 and 2022 consecutively.

In April 2022, Gatwa was cast in Greta Gerwig's Barbie as Artist Ken. He joined his Barbie co-stars in a choreographed performance of the song "I'm Just Ken" at the 96th Academy Awards. Gatwa performed an excerpt of Romeo and Juliet with Mei Mac at the 2023 Coronation Concert, and topped the Radio Times's TV 100 power list the same year.

=== 2023–2025: Doctor Who ===
In May 2022, it was announced that Gatwa had been cast in Doctor Who as a new incarnation of the show's protagonist, the Doctor, succeeding Jodie Whittaker in the role. Gatwa, who was cast in February, was the first black actor to lead the series, (Note: Peter Davison, who played the Fifth Doctor, had a mixed-race father from British Guiana (now Guyana). In Davison's words: "Not a lot of people know about that because I look so damned English".) the fourth Scottish actor, and the first actor born outside the United Kingdom to do so. He was expected to take over the role in the third and final of the 2022 specials in October 2022, but the final Thirteenth Doctor story "The Power of the Doctor" revealed that Gatwa would play the Fifteenth Doctor, with David Tennant (who had previously played the Tenth Doctor) returning to play the Fourteenth Doctor.

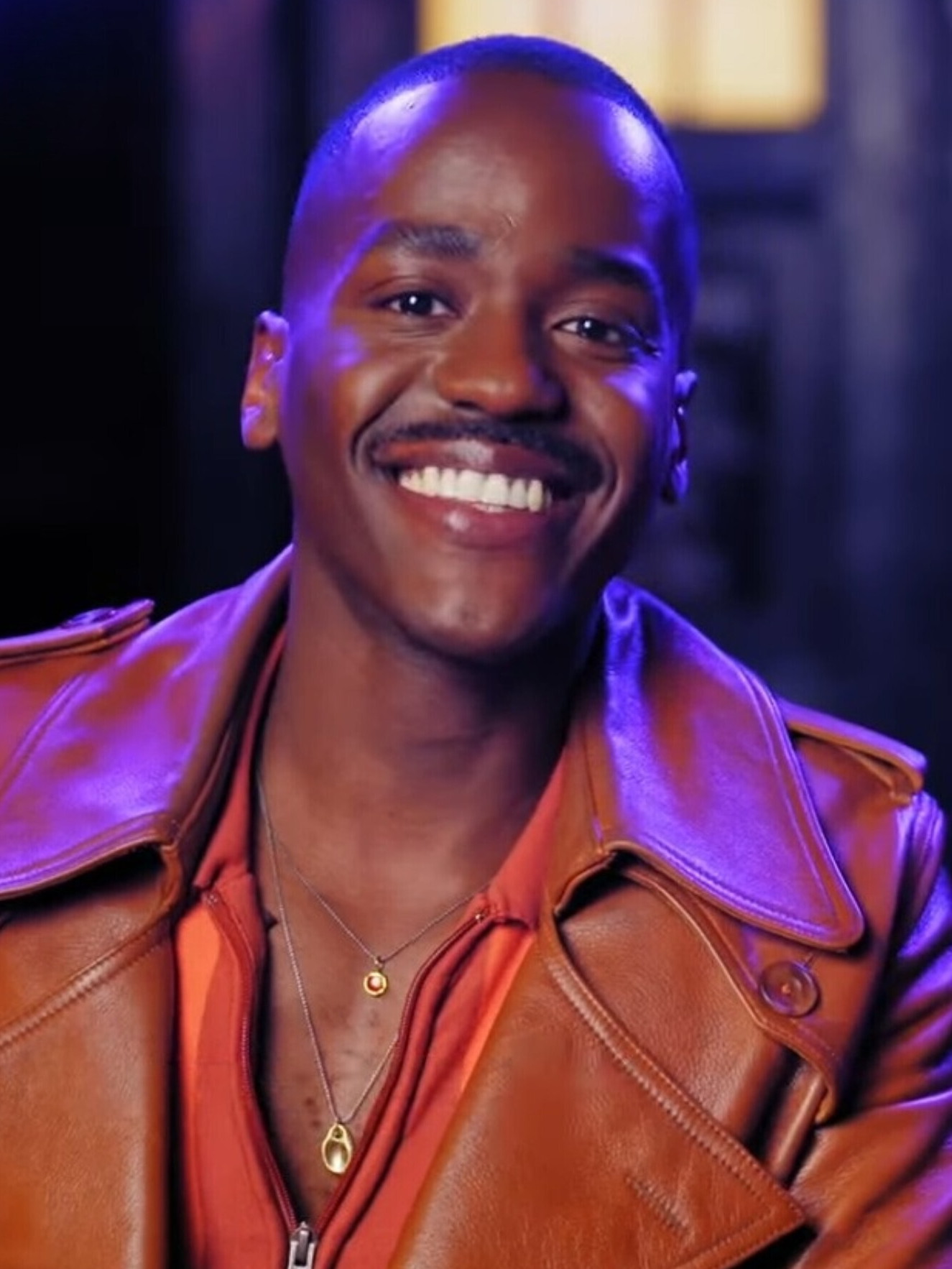
Ncuti Gatwa as the Fifteenth Doctor

Gatwa debuted in "The Giggle", the third of the 60th anniversary specials, on 9 December 2023, and starred in his first full episode, "The Church on Ruby Road" on Christmas Day 2023, which was followed by the show's fourteenth series. His performance in Doctor Who earned praise from critics. The Independent praised his "interstellar lead performance" and "megawatt charm". Variety wrote that his acting elevated the season, referencing his "refreshing dynamism that makes the season a uniquely mesmerizing watch". Naina Bajekal of Time magazine believed that Gatwa was "bringing Doctor Who into a new era." Mary McNamara of Los Angeles Times called Gatwa "an absolute delight" and wrote that his "unbridled exuberance makes this an easy sell and serves as a data bridge between new viewers and old." For his performance, Gatwa received the 2024 BAFTA Cymru Award for Best Actor, and was nominated for the Critics' Choice Television Award for Best Actor in a Drama Series.

As a result of being the first black Doctor, the BBC prepared for strong negative pushback to Gatwa's casting, and put security outside Gatwa's family members' homes; however Gatwa noted that the positive responses to his casting drowned out the negative responses. In 2024, he responded to social media users who criticised the casting of a black Doctor: "It’s not something I’ll avidly keep up on. The hate? It is kind of fascinating to me because there’s so much energy they’re putting into it… I think they need to go find a hobby is one thing." He was nearly cast in Jesse Eisenberg's film A Real Pain as Rwandan genocide survivor Eloge, but scheduling conflicts with Doctor Who led to Kurt Egyiawan being cast in the role instead.

In late 2024, Gatwa promised a forthcoming third season of his run of Doctor Who while on The Graham Norton Show, and claimed that filming was set to begin in 2025. These comments were reportedly "edited out" at a later date. Gatwa left the series in May 2025, following the broadcast of "The Reality War", with the Fifteenth Doctor regenerating into an unknown character played by Billie Piper. Gatwa's tenure of 18 episodes was the second shortest to date since 2005, behind Christopher Eccleston's 13 episode tenure as the Ninth Doctor. Gatwa subsequently stated it was "always the plan" for him to leave the role after two seasons due to its "physically and emotionally" demanding aspects, though his comments gave rise to the belief that he either departed or was let go from the programme due to uncertainty over Doctor Who's partnership with Disney+.

=== 2025–present: Stage and film work ===
In November 2024, Gatwa appeared as Algernon Moncrieff in Max Webster's production of Oscar Wilde's play The Importance of Being Earnest in the Lyttleton Theatre at the National Theatre, opposite Hugh Skinner and Sharon D. Clarke, running until January 2025. A filmed version of the play was screened in cinemas worldwide through National Theatre Live.

In April 2025, it was announced that Gatwa would star as Christopher Marlowe in the European premiere of Liz Duffy Adams's play Born with Teeth. The Royal Shakespeare Company production opened in London's West End from August 2025. On 2 May 2025, Gatwa was initially announced as the United Kingdom's spokesperson for the Eurovision Song Contest 2025, however two weeks later it was announced that he had withdrawn from the role due to "unforeseen circumstances"; he was replaced by Sophie Ellis-Bextor. Gatwa later stated that "it all panned out very interestingly. I pulled out of it a long time before it was announced. And it was announced when it was announced. I don't know why. But I was just very busy."

Gatwa played Jeffrey in the 2025 film The Roses, a remake of The War of the Roses (1989). Gatwa hosted the series finale of Saturday Night Live UK on 16 May 2026. Gatwa will appear in the upcoming comedy film Frank and Percy (2026). He will also portray British fashion journalist Michael Roberts in The Queen of Fashion, an upcoming biographical film starring Andrea Riseborough as Isabella Blow.

== Personal life ==
Gatwa publicly came out as queer in an August 2023 interview with Elle magazine, having previously avoided discussing his sexuality, despite public speculation, for his "safety and mental health". In the interview, Gatwa noted that he preferred not to label himself, and that he had been inspired by both his work on Sex Education and an encounter with a Rwandan woman at Manchester Pride some years previously, having "never met another queer Rwandan person before." He later stated that he had "never been in the closet, you know. I just never talked about it. The work I do is what's important."

On 29 May 2025, Gatwa joined other high-profile figures at a rally organised by Choose Love, taking turns to read aloud the names of Palestinian children killed in the Gaza war.

== Acting credits ==
=== Film ===
Year	Title	Role	Notes	Ref.
2019	Horrible Histories: The Movie – Rotten Romans	Timidius		
2021	The Last Letter from Your Lover	Nick		
2023	Barbie	Artist Ken		
2025	The Roses	Jeffrey		
2026	Frank and Percy †		Post-production	
TBA	The Queen of Fashion †	Michael Roberts	Post-production	

=== Television ===
Year	Title	Role	Notes	Ref.
2014	Bob Servant	Male Customer	Episode: "The Van"	
2015	Stonemouth	Dougie		
2019–2023	Sex Education	Eric Effiong	Main role, 32 episodes	
2023	Coronation Concert	Romeo	Representing the Royal Shakespeare Company, as part of the Royal Collaboration performance	
2023	An Adventure in Space and Time	Fifteenth Doctor	Cameo appearance; re-edit of 2013 film	
2023–2025	Doctor Who	Fifteenth Doctor	Lead role, 19 episodes	
2024	Masters of the Air	2nd Lt. Robert Daniels	Miniseries	
2024	Tales of the TARDIS	Fifteenth Doctor	Episode: "Pyramids of Mars"	
2026	Saturday Night Live UK	Himself / Host	Episode 8	
TBA	First Day on Earth †	Darren	Filming	

=== Theatre ===
Year	Title	Role	Venue	Ref.
2011	The Blues Brothers Live	James Brown/Stevie Wonder/Cab Calloway	Edinburgh Fringe	
2013	Victoria	Gavin/Callum/Patrick	Dundee Rep	
2013	Hecuba	Polydorus	Dundee Rep	
2013	The BFG	Sam/Head of Army/Childchewer	Dundee Rep	
2014	And Then There Were None	Anthony James Marston	Dundee Rep	
2014	Cars and Boys	Robert	Dundee Rep	
2014	Woman in Mind	Tony	Dundee Rep / Birmingham Rep	
2014	Romeo & Juliet	Mercutio	HOME	
2015	Shakespeare in Love	Wabash	Noël Coward Theatre	
2015	Lines	Valentine	The Yard Theatre	
2015–2017	946: The Amazing Story of Adolphus Tips	Adi Tips	Shakespeare's Globe	
2016	A Midsummer Night's Dream	Demetrius	Shakespeare's Globe	
2017	Trouble in Mind	John Nevins	Print Room at the Coronet	
2017–18	The Claim	Serge	Crucible Theatre	
2018	The Rivals	Captain Jack Absolute	Watermill Theatre	
2024–25	The Importance of Being Earnest	Algernon Moncrieff	Lyttelton Theatre, Royal National Theatre	
2025	Born with Teeth	Christopher Marlowe	Wyndham's Theatre	

=== Audio ===
Year	Title	Role	Production	Notes	Ref.
2022	Lusus	Christopher	BBC Radio 4	Episode: "Khar Darakh"	
2023	David Copperfield	David Copperfield	Audible		
2025	Gatsby in Harlem	Jay Gatsby	BBC Radio 3		

=== Video games ===
Year	Title	Role	Notes	Ref.
2022	Grid Legends	Valentin Manzi	Voice and motion capture	

== Awards and nominations ==
Year	Award	Category	Work	Result	Ref.
2014	Ian Charleson Awards	Best Performance in a Play	Romeo & Juliet	Nominated	
2019	MTV Movie Awards	Best Breakthrough Performance	Sex Education	Nominated	
2019	MTV Movie Awards	Best Kiss (with Connor Swindells)	Sex Education	Nominated	
2019	BAFTA Scotland Awards	Best Actor in Television	Sex Education	Nominated	
2019	Edinburgh International Television Festival	Best Breakthrough Talent	Sex Education	Nominated	
2020	Newport Beach Film Festival	Breakthrough Artist Honouree	Sex Education	Won	
2020	Broadcasting Press Guild Awards	Best Actor	Sex Education	Nominated	
2020	Broadcasting Press Guild Awards	Best Breakthrough	Sex Education	Won	
2020	Royal Television Society Awards	Comedy Performance (Male)	Sex Education	Won	
2020	Young Scot Awards	Entertainment	Sex Education	Won	
2020	BAFTA Television Awards	Best Male Comedy Performance	Sex Education	Nominated	
2020	BAFTA Scotland Awards	Best Actor in Television	Sex Education	Won	
2020	Rose d'Or	Performance of the Year	Sex Education	Won	
2021	BAFTA Television Awards	Best Male Comedy Performance	Sex Education	Nominated	
2022	National Comedy Awards	Outstanding Supporting Role	Sex Education	Won	
2022	Critics' Choice Television Awards	Best Supporting Actor in a Comedy Series	Sex Education	Nominated	
2022	NME Awards	Best TV Actor	Sex Education	Nominated	
2022	BAFTA Television Awards	Best Male Comedy Performance	Sex Education	Nominated	
2022	BAFTA Scotland Awards	Best Actor in Television	Sex Education	Nominated	
2022	BAFTA Scotland Awards	Audience Award	Sex Education	Nominated	
2024	BAFTA Cymru Awards	Actor	Doctor Who	Won	
2025	Critics' Choice Television Awards	Best Actor in a Drama Series	Doctor Who	Nominated	
2025	British Audio Awards	Best Performance	Gatsby in Harlem	Won	

== See also ==
- List of British actors
- List of Scottish actors
