= Emma Healey =

British novelist

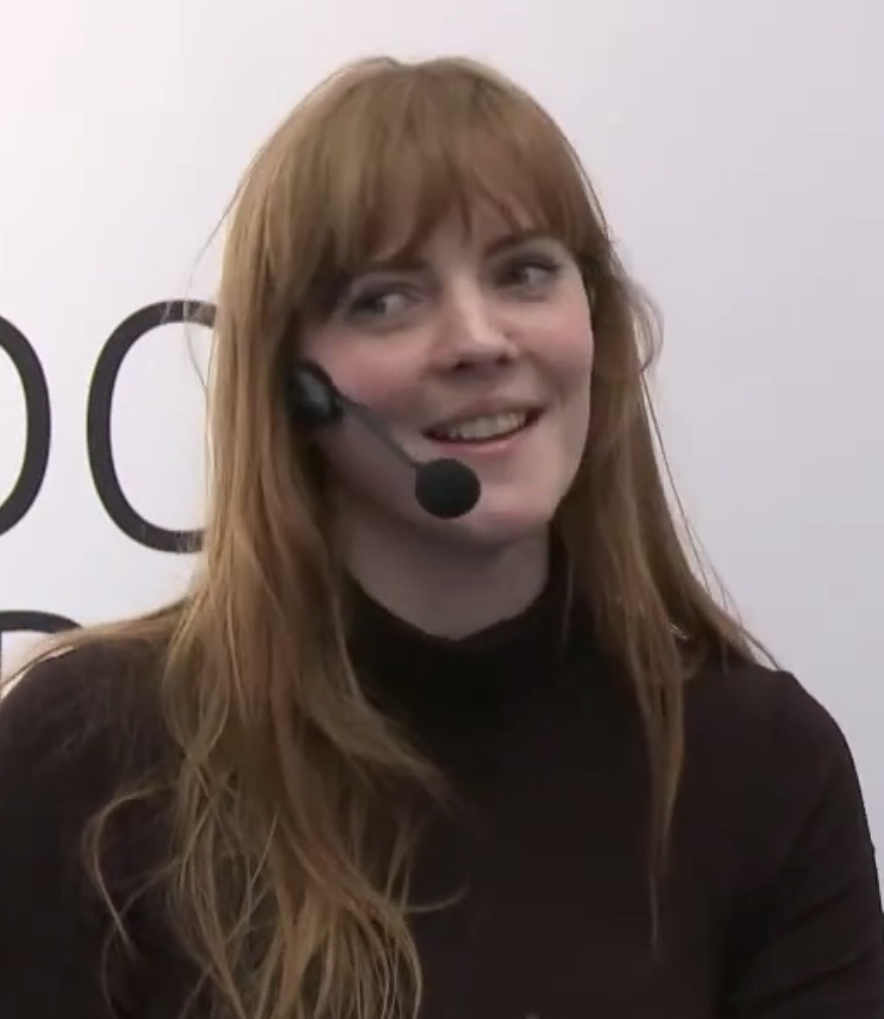
- Healey at the 2015 London Book Fair
- Born: Emma Constance Healey; 1985 (age 40–41); London, England
- Education: London College of Communication (BA); University of East Anglia (MA)
- Occupation: Writer
- Writing career
- Genre: Literary fiction
- Notable work: Elizabeth Is Missing
- Notable awards: Costa–First Novel (2014); Betty Trask Award (2015)
- Website: emmahealey.co.uk

Emma Constance Healey is a British novelist. Her debut novel, Elizabeth Is Missing (2014) won the annual Costa Book Award for First Novel.

== Life and career ==
Born in London, Healey completed a foundation year at Central Saint Martins before graduating with a BA in Book Arts and Crafts from the London College of Communication. She graduated from the University of East Anglia with an MA in creative writing (prose fiction) in 2011. Her first novel was adapted for television in 2019, Elizabeth Is Missing.

== Awards ==
Year	Title	Award	Category	Result	Ref
2014	Elizabeth Is Missing	British Book Award	New Writer	Shortlisted	
2014	Elizabeth Is Missing	Costa Book Award	First Novel	Won	
2014	Elizabeth Is Missing	Waverton Good Read Award	—	Longlisted	
2015	Elizabeth Is Missing	Authors' Club First Novel Award	—	Shortlisted	
2015	Elizabeth Is Missing	Baileys Women's Prize for Fiction	—	Longlisted	
2015	Elizabeth Is Missing	Betty Trask Prize and Awards	Betty Trask Award	Won	
2015	Elizabeth Is Missing	Desmond Elliott Prize	—	Shortlisted	
2015	Elizabeth Is Missing	Independent Booksellers' Book Prize	Adult	Shortlisted	
2016	Elizabeth Is Missing	International Dublin Literary Award	—	Longlisted	

== Works ==
- 2014: Elizabeth Is Missing
- 2018: Whistle in the Dark
- 2025: Sweat
