= Strange Interlude =

1920s play by Eugene O'Neill

- Original language: English
- Written by: Eugene O'Neill
- Characters: Edmund Darrell; Gordon Evans; Nina Leeds; Sam Evans; Prof. Henry Leeds; Charles Marsden; Madeline Arnold; Mrs. Amos Evans
- Genre: Drama
- Setting: Small university town in New England; various places in New York

Premiere
- Date: January 30, 1928
- Place: John Golden Theatre

Strange Interlude is an experimental play in nine acts by American playwright Eugene O'Neill. It won the 1928 Pulitzer Prize for Drama. Strange Interlude is one of the few modern plays to make extensive use of a soliloquy technique, in which the characters speak their inner thoughts to the audience.

O'Neill began work on it as early as 1923 and developed its scenario in 1925. He wrote the play between May 1926 and the summer of 1927, and completed its text for publication in January 1928, during the final rehearsals for its premiere performance. Strange Interlude opened on Broadway on January 30, 1928, with Lynn Fontanne in the central role of Nina Leeds. It was also produced in London at the Lyric Theatre in 1931. It was included in Burns Mantle's The Best Plays of 1927-1928.

Because of its length, around five to six hours if uncut, the play has sometimes been produced with a dinner break or on consecutive evenings. The play's themes – a woman's sexual affairs, mental illness, abortion, and deception over paternity – were controversial in the 1920s. It was censored or banned in many cities outside New York.

== Plot summary ==
The plot centers on Nina Leeds, the daughter of a classics professor at a college in New England, who is devastated when her adored fiancé is killed in World War I, before they have a chance to consummate their passion. Ignoring the unconditional love of the novelist Charles Marsden, Nina embarks on a series of sordid affairs before determining to marry an amiable fool, Sam Evans. While Nina is pregnant with Sam's child, she learns a horrifying secret known only to Sam's mother: insanity runs in the Evans family and could be inherited by any child of Sam's. Realizing that a child is essential to her own and to Sam's happiness, Nina decides on a "scientific" solution. She will abort Sam's child and conceive a child with the physician Ned Darrell, letting Sam believe that it is his. The plan backfires when Nina and Ned's intimacy leads to their falling passionately in love. Twenty years later, Sam and Nina's son Gordon Evans is approaching manhood, with only Nina and Ned aware of the boy's true parentage. In the final act, Sam dies of a stroke without learning the truth. This leaves Nina free to marry Ned Darrell, but she declines, choosing instead to marry the long-suffering Charlie Marsden, who proclaims that he now has "all the luck at last."

The meaning of the title is suggested by the aging Nina in a speech near the end of the play: "Our lives are merely strange dark interludes in the electrical display of God the Father!"

== Soliloquy technique ==
Many who have never read Strange Interlude or seen it performed will nevertheless associate the title with the unusual soliloquy technique employed by O’Neill to delve into his characters’ psychology. Throughout the play, the characters alternate their spoken dialogue with monologues and side comments, many in stream-of-consciousness style, expressing their unspoken thoughts.

The play begins with a long soliloquy by the writer Charles Marsden (whom Nina Leeds patronizingly dubs “Dear Old Charlie”). In this monologue, Marsden lays bare his ambiguous passion for Nina and his own conflicted attitude toward sex:

(then self-reassuringly)

but there is a public to cherish them, evidently … and I can write! … more than one can say of these modern sex-yahoos! … I must start work tomorrow … I'd like to use the Professor in a novel sometime … and his wife … seems impossible she's been dead six years … so aggressively his wife! … poor Professor! now it's Nina who bosses him … but that's different … she has bossed me, too, ever since she was a baby … she's a woman now … known love and death … Gordon brought down in flames … two days before the armistice … what fiendish irony! … his wonderful athlete's body … her lover … charred bones in a cage of twisted steel … no wonder she broke down … Mother said she's become quite queer lately … Mother seemed jealous of my concern … why have I never fallen in love with Nina? … could I? … that way … used to dance her on my knee … sit her on my lap … even now she'd never think anything about it … but sometimes the scent of her hair and skin … like a dreamy drug … dreamy! … there's the rub! … all dreams with me! … my sex life among the phantoms! …

(He grins torturedly.)

Why? … oh, this digging in gets nowhere … to the devil with sex! … our impotent pose of today to beat the loud drum on fornication! … boasters … eunuchs parading with the phallus! … giving themselves away … whom do they fool? … not even themselves! …

In Act Two, Marsden is introduced to Sam Evans, who will eventually marry Nina:

MARSDEN--(studying him keenly--amused)

This is certainly no giant intellect … overgrown boy … likable quality though …

EVANS--(uneasy under Marsden's eyes)

Giving me the once-over … seems like good egg … Nina says he is … suppose I ought to say something about his books, but I can't even remember a title of one …

(He suddenly blurts out) You've known Nina--Miss Leeds--ever since she was a kid, haven't you?

MARSDEN--(a bit shortly) Yes. How long have you known her?

Later in Act Two, Dr. Ned Darrell, who is treating Nina for nervous disorders, arrives, and he and Marsden size each other up:

DARRELL--(turning to Marsden) It's for Nina. She's got to get some sleep tonight. (He sits down abruptly in the chair at center. Marsden unconsciously takes the Professor's place behind the table. The two men stare at each other for a moment, Darrell with a frank probing, examining look that ruffles Marsden and makes him all the more resentful toward him.)

This Marsden doesn't like me … that's evident … but he interests me … read his books … wanted to know his bearing on Nina's case … his novels just well-written surface … no depth, no digging underneath … why? … has the talent but doesn't dare … afraid he'll meet himself somewhere … one of those poor devils who spend their lives trying not to discover which sex they belong to! …

MARSDEN--

Giving me the fishy, diagnosing eye they practice at medical school … like freshmen from Ioway cultivating broad A's at Harvard! … what is his specialty? … neurologist, I think … I hope not psychoanalyst … a lot to account for, Herr Freud! … punishment to fit his crimes, be forced to listen eternally during breakfast while innumerable plain ones tell him dreams about snakes … pah, what an easy cure-all! … sex the philosopher's stone … "O Oedipus, O my king! The world is adopting you!" …

DARRELL--

Must pitch into him about Nina … have to have his help … damn little time to convince him … he's the kind you have to explode a bomb under to get them to move … but not too big a bomb … they blow to pieces easily …

In Act Eight, set during a rowing competition twenty years later, Nina has difficulty coming to terms with the fact that her beloved son Gordon is now a grown man with a fiancée, Madeline:

NINA--(thinking--bitterly)

Young eyes! … they look into Gordon's eyes! … he sees love in her young eyes! … mine are old now! …

EVANS--(pulling out his watch) Soon be time for the start. (comes forward--exasperatedly) Of course, the damned radio has to pick out this time to go dead! Brand new one I had installed especially for this race, too! Just my luck! (coming to Nina and putting his hand on her shoulder) Gosh, I'll bet Gordon's some keyed-up right at this moment, Nina!

MADELINE--(without lowering the glasses) Poor kid! I'll bet he is!

NINA--(thinking with intense bitterness)

That tone in her voice! … her love already possesses him! … my son! …

(vindictively) But she won't! … as long as I live! …

(flatly) Yes, he must be nervous.

EVANS--(taking his hand away, sharply) I didn't mean nervous. He doesn't know what it is to have nerves. Nothing's ever got him rattled yet. (this last with a resentful look down at her as he moves back to the rail)

MADELINE--(with the calm confidence of one who knows) Yes, you can bank on Gordon never losing his nerve.

NINA--(coldly) I'm quite aware my son isn't a weakling--(meaningly, with a glance at Madeline) even though he does do weak things sometimes.

MADELINE--(without lowering the glasses from her eyes--thinking good-naturedly)

Ouch! … that was meant for me! …

(then hurt)

Why does she dislike me so? … I've done my best, for Gordon's sake, to be nice to her…

EVANS--(looking back at Nina resentfully--thinking)

Another nasty crack at Madeline! … Nina's certainly become the prize bum sport! … I thought once her change of life was over she'd be ashamed of her crazy jealousy … instead of that it's got worse … but I'm not going to let her come between Gordon and Madeline … he loves her and she loves him … and her folks have got money and position, too … and I like her a lot … and, by God, I'm going to see to it their marriage goes through on schedule, no matter how much Nina kicks up! …

(Quotes from the text of Strange Interlude at Project Gutenberg.)

== Production ==
Produced by the Theatre Guild, Strange Interlude opened January 30, 1928, at the John Golden Theatre. The original production was directed by Philip Moeller with settings by Jo Mielziner. The nine-act drama ran five hours, beginning at 5:15 p.m., breaking for dinner at 7:40 p.m., and resuming at 9 p.m.

=== Cast ===
- Tom Powers as Charles Marsden
- Philip Leigh as Professor Leeds
- Lynn Fontanne as Nina Leeds
- Earle Larimore as Sam Evans
- Glenn Anders as Edmund Darrell
- Helen Westley as Mrs. Amos Evans
- Charles Walters as Gordon Evans, as a boy
- Ethel Westley as Madeline Arnold
- John J. Burns as Gordon Evans, as a man

Five members of the original cast – Powers, Helen Westley, Burns, Ethel Westley, and Walters – were still with the play when the production reached its first anniversary, and they had not missed a single performance. Powers was compelled to leave the cast at the end of March 1929 due to exhaustion. The original Broadway production ran 17 months.

Recent revivals of Strange Interlude have mostly edited the text to allow a three to 3.5-hour running time that can be accommodated in a normal, if lengthy, evening performance. Notable recent productions include the 1985 London and Broadway revival starring Glenda Jackson (also adapted for television — see below), a 2012 production at the Shakespeare Theatre Company in Washington, D.C., and a 2013 production at the National Theatre London, starring Anne-Marie Duff. In 2017 actor David Greenspan revived the play as a six-hour solo show at the Irondale Center in Brooklyn.

== Adaptations ==
Strange Interlude was adapted by Hollywood only once, in 1932. The MGM film, which starred Norma Shearer as Nina Leeds and Clark Gable as Dr. Ned Darrell, was a shortened and toned-down version of the play. Voiceovers were used for the soliloquies.

A 1963 Actors Studio production directed by Jose Quintero was issued by Columbia Masterworks Records in 1964. The company included Betty Field, Jane Fonda, Rip Torn replacing Ben Gazzara, Pat Hingle, Geoffrey Horne, Geraldine Page, William Prince, Franchot Tone, and Richard Thomas. The album set was five LPs and was nominated for a Grammy in the category Best Documentary, Spoken Word Or Drama Recording (other Than Comedy).

A 1985 Broadway revival at the Nederlander Theater starred Glenda Jackson, Brian Cox, Edward Petherbridge and James Hazeldine, with Tom Aldredge, Elizabeth Lawrence, Charley Lang and Caitlin Clarke.

A 1988 television version directed by Herbert Wise was based on a 1985 London stage revival and starred Edward Petherbridge as Charles, Glenda Jackson as Nina, and David Dukes as Ned (with Kenneth Branagh in the small part of Gordon Evans). This version follows O'Neill's original text fairly closely (except that it eliminates most of Act 7, a scene set when Gordon Evans is 11 years old), and allows the actors to speak their soliloquies naturally in the manner of the stage production. It was broadcast in the U.S. as part of the PBS series American Playhouse.

== Cultural references ==
- Groucho Marx parodies this play in the Marx Brothers' stage play Animal Crackers, originally produced about ten months after Strange Interlude's debut, and in the 1930 film adaptation of the Marxes' play. On the first of three "interludes," he says, "If I were Eugene O'Neill, I could tell you what I really think of you two," and in the film, he soon adds, "Pardon me while I have a strange interlude," whereupon he walks over to the camera and makes ersatz philosophical comments to himself and the audience.
- The 1932 film Me and My Gal parodies the film version of the play released the same year, which used voiceovers instead of soliloquies. Spencer Tracy and Joan Bennett talk about having seen "Strange Innertubes", then have a romantic talk that parodies the technique.
- MAD Magazine satirically combined the play with the television show Hazel in a piece that ran in the 1960s ("A Strange Interlude With Hazey").
- The fledgling Howard Johnson's restaurant chain received a boost in 1929 when the mayor of Boston, Malcolm Nichols, banned a production of Strange Interlude from his city. The Theatre Guild moved the production to suburban Quincy, where it was presented with a dinner break. The original Howard Johnson's restaurant was near the theater, and hundreds of influential Bostonians discovered the restaurant, eventually leading to nationwide publicity for the chain.
- In the 1974 film We All Loved Each Other So Much, Antonio and Luciana attend this play; then Ettore Scola uses the soliloquy technique several times in that film.
- Charlotte Greenwood, in the 1942 film Springtime in the Rockies, begins her solo dance routine and soliloquy with a "strange interlude".
- The play is referenced in the TV series Frasier Season 5 Episode 15 "Room Service" with Frasier Crane remarking "Aren't we a pair? A narcoleptic and a weak-willed sexual obsessive. We're like a couple of brothers out of an O'Neill play." The episode's title cards also reference O'Neill's plays.

== Contemporary reception ==
Time magazine wrote, somewhat dismissively, "The Theatre Guild indulges itself with a nine-act introspection into the life of a neurotic woman."
