= House Calls (1978 film) =

1978 film by Howard Zieff

- Theatrical release poster
- Directed by: Howard Zieff
- Written by: Julius J. Epstein (story); Alan Mandel (writer); Max Shulman (story); Charles Shyer (writer)
- Produced by: Jennings Lang (executive producer); Arlene Sellers (producer); Alex Winitsky (producer)
- Starring: Walter Matthau; Glenda Jackson; Art Carney; Richard Benjamin
- Cinematography: David M. Walsh
- Edited by: Edward Warschilka
- Music by: Henry Mancini
- Distributed by: Universal Pictures
- Release date: March 15, 1978
- Running time: 98 minutes
- Country: United States
- Language: English
- Budget: $6.5 million
- Box office: $29.0 million

House Calls is a 1978 American comedy drama film directed by Howard Zieff and starring Walter Matthau, Glenda Jackson, Art Carney and Richard Benjamin.

The film was a box-office success, grossing $29.0 million against a $6.5 million budget, and later spawned a television series that aired for three seasons on CBS from 1979 to 1982. House Calls reunites Matthau and Carney, stars of the original Broadway production of Neil Simon’s play The Odd Couple.

== Plot ==
Charles "Charley" Nichols is a respected doctor. He is also a new widower, and as soon as he returns to Los Angeles from a tropical vacation and period of mourning, he is propositioned by a number of women.

The hospital at which Charley practices is ineptly run by Dr. Amos Willoughby, a senile chief of staff. Typical of the incompetence there is how the fractured jaw of patient Ann Atkinson is being treated with a primitive contraption by Willoughby.

Charley frees her from the device, angering Willoughby for stealing a patient. Charley and his pal, Dr. Norman Solomon, know something needs to be done about Willoughby, but because the "old fart" now has a hold on him, Charley agrees to nominate Willoughby for one more term as the hospital's chief.

Ann, who is divorced, proves attractive to Charley. She is a bright conversationalist and bakes delicious cheesecake that she sells. Charley enjoys being with her and helps her land a job at the hospital, but with all the available women out there, he is reluctant to commit to a monogamous relationship. Ann finally persuades him to agree to a trial period of a few weeks.

At the hospital, a botched diagnosis leads to the death of a wealthy owner of a baseball team. The widow, Ellen Grady, intends to sue for millions, claiming that the only thing that she knows about medicine is that nobody at this place can practice it.

Charley tries to charm her. They share a common background, and Mrs. Grady is definitely interested in him. But she nonetheless adamantly refuses to drop the lawsuit. When Charley neglects a date with Ann and shows up late with a poor excuse, she angrily hides his clothes while he showers.

Ann also wants him to show some backbone and not nominate Willoughby for chief of medicine, but he does so anyway. Willoughby reneges on a promise to stop personally treating patients, so Charley takes back his nomination. He does his best to win back Ann as well.

== Cast ==
- Walter Matthau as Dr. Charles Nichols
- Glenda Jackson as Ann Atkinson
- Art Carney as Dr. Amos Willoughby
- Richard Benjamin as Dr. Norman Solomon
- Candice Azzara as Ellen Grady
- Len Lesser as Waiter
- Dick O'Neill as Irwin

== Production ==
Julius Epstein said that the film "was originally a play written by Max Shulman, who sent it to me. Then, we sat down and made it from that into an original movie. But there we had a fight with the director, and he brought in a couple of writers and crapped up the ending, terribly so. I have mixed feelings about House Calls."

== Reception ==
In his annual movie guide, Leonard Maltin gave the film 3½ stars out of 4, and called it a "laughing-out-loud contemporary comedy".

Frederic and Mary Ann Brussat of Spirituality & Practice were also enthusiastic: "Howard Zieff directs this romantic comedy with a nutty appreciation for its likeable characters. The dialogue is bright and witty and the pace is brisk. It brings to mind the screwball comedies of the Thirties and Forties."

AllMovie gave the film 3½ stars out of 5, and described Carney as "unbearably funny at times".

On the review aggregator website Rotten Tomatoes, 50% of 10 critics' reviews are positive.

=== Awards ===
The film earned a Writers Guild of America Award nomination for Best Comedy Written Directly for the Screen.

== Home media ==
House Calls was released on DVD in 2005. Portions of the soundtrack were edited for the DVD; for example, the Beatles' "Something" was replaced because the film did not acquire the license to use the song on home video.

== Television series ==
In 1979, CBS debuted a television sitcom version of House Calls starring Lynn Redgrave as Ann Atkinson (later replaced by Sharon Gless) and Wayne Rogers as her doctor, now named Dr. Charley Michaels. The television series ran through 1982.
