= Elizabeth Is Missing =

2019 British drama television film

- Based on: Elizabeth Is Missing by Emma Healey
- Written by: Andrea Gibb
- Story by: Emma Healey
- Directed by: Aisling Walsh
- Starring: Glenda Jackson; Helen Behan; Sophie Rundle; Liv Hill; Nell Williams; Mark Stanley; Maggie Steed; Sam Hazeldine
- Music by: Dominik Scherrer
- Country of origin: United Kingdom
- Original language: English

Production
- Executive producer: Sarah Brown
- Producer: Chrissy Skinns
- Cinematography: Lukas Strebel
- Editor: Alex Mackie
- Running time: 87 minutes
- Production company: STV Studios

Original release
- Network: BBC One
- Release: 8 December 2019

Elizabeth Is Missing is a 2019 British television drama film directed by Aisling Walsh, adapted by Andrea Gibb from the novel of the same name by Emma Healey. It was broadcast on 8 December 2019 on BBC One. It stars Glenda Jackson as Maud, an elderly woman living with dementia who struggles to piece together a double mystery.

It premiered on PBS on 3 January 2021 as part of its Masterpiece anthology series.

== Summary ==
Maud, a grandmother in her 80s living with Alzheimer's disease, relies on sticky notes to get through the day as her memory slowly deteriorates. One day her best friend, another elderly woman named Elizabeth, fails to meet her as promised. Maud begins to believe something sinister has happened to Elizabeth, but her attempts to raise the alarm are dismissed by those around her. She is forced to investigate on her own as her memory flashes back to the mystery of another disappearance: that of her elder sister, Sukey, 70 years earlier.

Ultimately, it is revealed that Elizabeth is not missing, she is in the hospital having become sick following gardening with Maud. Prompted by Maud, her daughter Helen digs in the garden of Elizabeth's home, which was meant to be the future home of Sukey and her husband 70 years prior, and uncovers the skeletal remains of Sukey. Sukey's body had been buried there by Frank, Sukey's husband, after he had killed her, when the neighbourhood was being constructed.

At Elizabeth's funeral, Maud asks Helen: "Did I tell you? Elizabeth is missing."

== Cast ==
- Glenda Jackson as Maud Horsham, a widowed grandmother living with Alzheimer's disease who lives alone
- Liv Hill as Young Maud Palmer
- Sophie Rundle as Susan "Sukey" Jefford, Maud's sister who went missing seventy years earlier
- Helen Behan as Helen, Maud's daughter
- Nell Williams as Katy, Helen's daughter and Maud's granddaughter
- Mark Stanley as Frank Jefford, Sukey's husband
- Neil Pendleton as Douglas, a lodger who stays with Sukey, Maud and their parents
- Sam Hazeldine as Tom Horsham, Maud's son who lives in Germany
- Maggie Steed as Elizabeth, Maud's friend
- John-Paul Hurley as Mr Palmer, Maud and Sukey's father
- Michelle Duncan as Mrs Palmer, Maud and Sukey's mother
- Linda Hargreaves as Carla, Maud's carer
- Tom Urie as a desk sergeant
- Anna-Maria Nabirye as Detective Sergeant Grainger
- Rachel Mcphail as PC Pam
- Stuart McQuarrie as Peter, Elizabeth's son

== Background ==
Elizabeth Is Missing is based on the novel of the same name by Emma Healey, published in 2014. Glenda Jackson, who left acting in 1992 to begin a 23-year career as a Labour Party MP, returned to the stage in 2015. She stated that she was inspired after director Aisling Walsh approached her about the role in New York. "I read the script and the book, and they concern issues I have been banging on about for a decade. We are living in a society where no political party, at least in my country, has addressed the issue of how we provide the money to provide the care that an elderly population needs," Jackson told The New York Times. To prepare for the role, Jackson met with a doctor from Dementia UK, who she said "explained that the anger that many patients with dementia express was frustration."

== Production ==
STV Studios were responsible for Elizabeth Is Missing, which was filmed in July and August 2019 in Scotland. Paisley, Renfrewshire, stood in for an English town in flashbacks to the 1940s.

== Reception ==
Elizabeth Is Missing was well received by critics, who praised the outstanding performance by Glenda Jackson, who returned to television after a 27-year absence. It was given five stars by Lucy Mangan of The Guardian, who wrote that Jackson "is wonderful, in that vanishingly rare way that can come only from next-level talent as razor-sharp as it ever was plus 40 years of honing your technique, whetting both blades on 80 years of life experience." Suzi Feay of the Financial Times also gave it five stars.

Fiona Sturges of The Independent gave it four out of five stars, writing: "Rarely off the screen, Jackson is remarkable, playing Maud not as a benign and crinkly grandma but a proud woman unmoored and rendered increasingly impatient and volatile.... Dementia eats away not just at memory but identity, agency and empathy. The pain of these losses are sharply drawn here, both in Maud and her family who mourn the mother and grandmother they once knew."

Carol Midgley of The Times also gave Elizabeth Is Missing four out of five stars, praising the format told from Maud's point of view: "[It] was cleverly told so that we didn't know where Elizabeth was, but experienced her 'disappearance' from Maud's perspective; confused and disjointed with little sense of elapsing time."

The Daily Telegraph's Anita Singh, who gave the film five stars, said Jackson "gave one of the performances of her lifetime" and predicted her as a shoo-in for next year's British Academy Television Award for Best Actress: "If you are an actress hoping to win a BAFTA in February, and your name is not Glenda Jackson, I regret to inform you that this is not your year."

Roslyn Sulcas, who interviewed Jackson for The New York Times, commented that the film was "rapturously received" in the United Kingdom, and commented on the rarity of a film not only focused on dementia but starring an elderly woman.

On 31 July 2020, Jackson won the BAFTA TV award in the leading actress category. In November, she also won the International Emmy Award for Best Actress.

== Accolades ==
Award	Date of the ceremony	Category	Recipient(s)	Result	Ref
Broadcasting Press Guild Awards	13 March 2020	Best Actress	Glenda Jackson	Won	
Broadcasting Press Guild Awards	13 March 2020	Best Drama/Mini Series	Elizabeth is Missing	Nominated	
Cameo Awards	20 March 2020	Book to TV Award	Original book by Emma Healey (Penguin); Adapted by Andrea Gibb	Won	
Royal Television Society Scotland Awards	3 June 2020	Drama	Elizabeth is Missing	Nominated	
Royal Television Society Scotland Awards	3 June 2020	Writer	Andrea Gibb	Won	
Banff World Media Rockie Awards	15 June 2020	Television Movie	Elizabeth is Missing	Won	
British Academy Television Awards	July 31, 2020	Best Single Drama	Andrea Gibb, Aisling Walsh, Sarah Brown, Chrissy Skinns	Nominated	
British Academy Television Awards	July 31, 2020	Best Actress	Glenda Jackson	Won	
Irish Film and Television Awards	October 20, 2020	Best Director Drama	Aisling Walsh	Nominated	
Edinburgh TV Awards	17 November 2020	Best Drama	Elizabeth is Missing	Nominated	
Edinburgh TV Awards	17 November 2020	Best Actor	Glenda Jackson	Won	
International Emmy Awards	November 23, 2020	Best Actress	Glenda Jackson	Won	
C21 International Drama Awards	2 December 2020	Best TV Movie	Elizabeth is Missing	Won	
C21 International Drama Awards	2 December 2020	Best Individual Performance in a Drama Series	Glenda Jackson	Nominated	
British Academy Scotland Awards	December 8, 2020	Best Television Scripted	Elizabeth is Missing	Nominated	
British Academy Scotland Awards	December 8, 2020	Best Actress	Glenda Jackson	Won	
British Academy Scotland Awards	December 8, 2020	Best Writer	Andrea Gibb	Nominated	
British Academy Scotland Awards	December 8, 2020	Best Director (Fiction)	Aisling Walsh	Nominated	
Royal Television Society Programme Awards	16 March 2021	Best Drama	Elizabeth is Missing	Won	
Royal Television Society Programme Awards	16 March 2021	Best Actor (female)	Glenda Jackson	Nominated	
Broadcast Awards	27 May 2021	Best Single Drama	Elizabeth is Missing	Won	
Celtic Media Festival Awards	September, 2021	Best Single Drama (over 30 minutes)	Elizabeth is Missing	Nominated	
