= Hedda (1975 film) =

1975 British film by Trevor Nunn

- British quad poster
- Directed by: Trevor Nunn
- Written by: Trevor Nunn
- Based on: Hedda Gabler; 1891 play by Henrik Ibsen
- Produced by: Robert Enders
- Starring: Glenda Jackson; Timothy West; Peter Eyre; Patrick Stewart; Jennie Linden
- Cinematography: Douglas Slocombe
- Edited by: Peter Tanner
- Music by: Laurie Johnson
- Production company: Royal Shakespeare Company
- Distributed by: Scotia-Barber
- Release date: 19 December 1975
- Running time: 102 minutes
- Country: United Kingdom
- Language: English

Hedda is a 1975 film adaptation of Henrik Ibsen's 1891 play Hedda Gabler, written for the screen and directed by Trevor Nunn, and starring Glenda Jackson, Timothy West, Peter Eyre, Patrick Stewart (in his screen debut), and Jennie Linden. The plot involves the experiences of the title character, Hedda (Jackson), the daughter of a general, who is trapped in a marriage and a house that she does not want.

This film was the first major theatrical film version of the play in English, though another followed in 2025. Other productions of the play in English with sound have been made for television.

Hedda earned Jackson her fourth and final nomination for the Academy Award for Best Actress, as well as a third nomination for the Golden Globe Award for Best Actress in a Motion Picture – Drama. Additionally, Jackson would go on to win the David di Donatello Award for Best Foreign Actress. It was also nominated for the Golden Globe Award for Best Foreign Film. The film was screened at the 1976 Cannes Film Festival, but wasn't entered into the main competition.

== Cast ==
- Glenda Jackson as Hedda Gabler
- Timothy West as Judge Brack
- Peter Eyre as George Tesman
- Patrick Stewart as Ejlert Løvborg
- Jennie Linden as Thea Elvsted
- Constance Chapman as Juliane Tesman (Aunt Julie)
- Pam St. Clement as Berthe

== Reception ==
=== Reaction ===
AllMovie rated the film 3-stars-out-of-5 and described it as "a tasteful, literate cinematic translation of the Royal Shakespeare Company's production Henrik Ibsen's Hedda Gabler." In The New York Times, Vincent Canby praised Jackson's performance: "This version of "Hedda Gabler" is all Miss Jackson's Hedda and, I must say, great fun to watch ... Miss Jackson's technical virtuosity is particularly suited to a character like Hedda. Her command of her voice and her body," and concluded, "the physical production is handsome, and Mr. Nunn is most successful in preserving the claustrophobic nature of the play without creating a static film. Hedda is an imaginative, intelligent film version of a play that I wasn't breathlessly waiting to see at this moment."

Judith Crist of Saturday Review wrote: "a startlingly fresh and perceptive version written and directed by Trevor Nunn and ingeniously interpreted by Jackson. Seldom has a classic been so well served." J.C. Trewin wrote in The Illustrated London News: "No Hedda, seeking an object she cannot determine, has been more infinitely bored, or more dangerous." Frederic and Mary Ann Brussat of Spirituality & Practice called the film "A fine screen interpretation of Henrik Ibsen's play" and singled out Jackson's performance for praise: "Glenda Jackson's Hedda battles with the trolls in her heart. She is quite believable as a woman who wants more than anything else the power over other people's lives. When she is denied this right — traditionally a male reserve in her society — the results are grim."

=== Awards and nominations ===
Award	Category	Nominee(s)	Result	Ref
Academy Awards	Best Actress	Glenda Jackson	Nominated	
David di Donatello Awards	Best Foreign Actress	Glenda Jackson	Won (Note: Tied with Isabelle Adjani for The Story of Adele H..)	
Golden Globe Awards	Best Foreign Film		Nominated	
Golden Globe Awards	Best Actress in a Motion Picture – Drama	Glenda Jackson	Nominated	
