= Glenda Jackson =

English actress and politician (1936–2023)

Glenda Jackson CBE
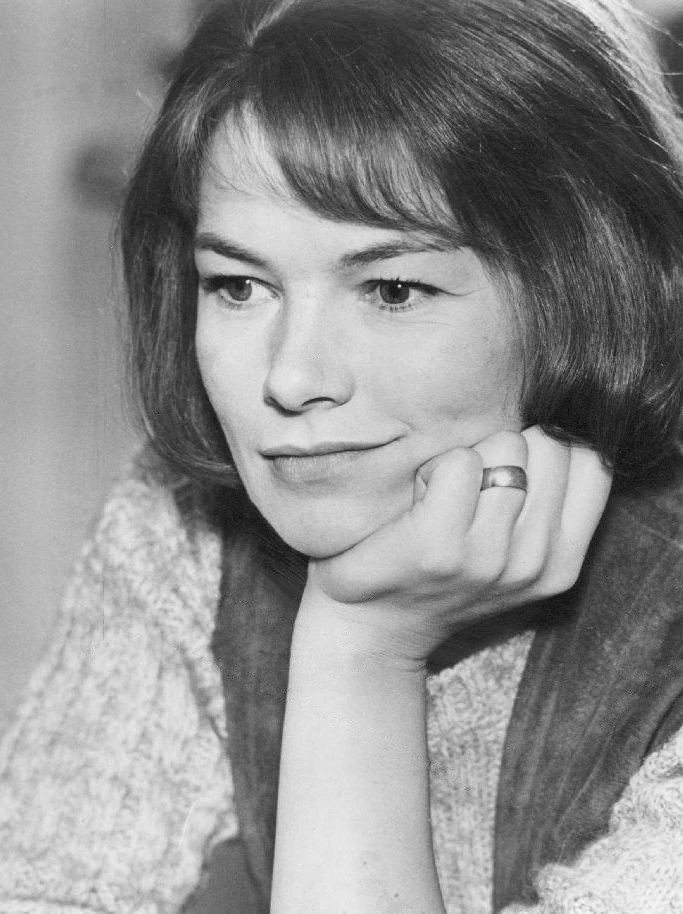
- Jackson in 1971
- Born: Glenda May Jackson; 9 May 1936; Birkenhead, England
- Died: 15 June 2023 (aged 87); Blackheath, London, England
- Education: Royal Academy of Dramatic Art
- Occupations: Actress; politician
- Years active: 1957–1991; 2015–2023 (as actress)
- Political party: Labour
- Spouse: Roy Hodges (m. 1958; div. 1976)
- Children: Dan Hodges
- Awards: Full list

Parliamentary Under-Secretary of State for Transport
- In office 6 May 1997 – 29 July 1999
- Prime Minister: Tony Blair
- Preceded by: John Bowis
- Succeeded by: Keith Hill

Member of Parliament for Hampstead and Kilburn Hampstead and Highgate (1992–2010)
- In office 9 April 1992 – 30 March 2015
- Preceded by: Geoffrey Finsberg
- Succeeded by: Tulip Siddiq
- Glenda Jackson's voice The Film Programme, 6 July 2007

Glenda May Jackson (9 May 1936 – 15 June 2023) was an English actress and politician. Over the course of her distinguished career she received numerous accolades including two Academy Awards, three Emmy Awards and a Tony Award, making her one of the few performers to achieve the "Triple Crown of Acting". Her other accolades include two BAFTAs and a Golden Globe Award. A member of the Labour Party, she served continuously as a Member of Parliament (MP) for 23 years, first for Hampstead and Highgate from 1992 to 2010, and then, following boundary changes, for Hampstead and Kilburn from 2010 to 2015.

Jackson won the Academy Award for Best Actress twice, for the romance films Women in Love (1969) and A Touch of Class (1973), but she did not appear in person to collect either due to work commitments. She also won the BAFTA Award for Best Actress in a Leading Role for Sunday Bloody Sunday (1971). Her other notable films include Mary, Queen of Scots (1971), Hedda (1975), The Incredible Sarah (1976), House Calls (1978), Stevie (1978) and Hopscotch (1980). She won two Primetime Emmy Awards for her portrayal of Queen Elizabeth I in the BBC series Elizabeth R (1971). She received both the BAFTA Award and International Emmy Award for her performance in Elizabeth Is Missing (2019).

She studied at the Royal Academy of Dramatic Art (RADA) and made her Broadway theatre debut in Marat/Sade (1966). She received five Laurence Olivier Award nominations for her West End theatre roles in Stevie (1977), Antony and Cleopatra (1979), Rose (1980), Strange Interlude (1984) and King Lear (2016), the last being her first role after a 25-year absence from acting, which she reprised on Broadway in 2019. On Broadway, she won the Tony Award for Best Actress in a Play for her role in the revival of Edward Albee's Three Tall Women (2018) and received nominations for her work in Marat/Sade (1966), Rose (1981), Strange Interlude (1985), and Macbeth (1988).

Jackson transitioned her career to politics from 1992 to 2015, and was elected MP for Hampstead and Highgate at the 1992 general election. She was a junior transport minister from 1997 to 1999 during the first Blair ministry; she later became critical of Tony Blair. After constituency boundary changes, she represented Hampstead and Kilburn from 2010. At the 2010 general election, her majority of 42 votes, confirmed after a recount, was the narrowest margin of victory in Great Britain. Jackson stood down at the 2015 general election and returned to acting.

== Early life and education ==
Glenda May Jackson was born at 151 Market Street in Birkenhead, Cheshire, on 9 May 1936. Her mother named her after the Hollywood film star Glenda Farrell. Shortly after her birth, the family moved to Hoylake, also on the Wirral. Her family was poor, and lived in a two-up two-down house with an outside toilet at 21 Lake Place. Her father Harry was a bricklayer, who served on minesweepers and was largely absent, for six years during World War II, while her mother Joan (née Pearce) worked in a local shop, pulled pints in a pub and was a domestic cleaner.

The eldest of four daughters, Jackson was educated at Holy Trinity Church of England and Cathcart Street primary schools, followed by West Kirby County Grammar School for Girls in nearby West Kirby. Poor exam results led to her leaving school at 16, to work at Boots Pharmacy for two years.

Jackson performed in the Townswomen's Guild drama group through her teenage years. She made her first acting appearance in J. B. Priestley's Mystery of Greenfingers in 1952 for the YMCA Players in Hoylake. She auditioned in London, for the Royal Academy of Dramatic Art (RADA) in 1954, obtaining a discretionary award from Cheshire education committee that helped to finance her acting course. In January 1955, she moved to London, to commence her studies with RADA.

== Acting career ==
=== 1957–1968: Rise to prominence ===
In January 1957, Jackson made her professional stage debut in Ted Willis's Doctor in the House at the Connaught Theatre in Worthing. This was followed by Terence Rattigan's Separate Tables, while Jackson was still at RADA, and she began appearing in repertory theatre. She was also a stage manager at Crewe in repertory theatre.

From 1958 to 1961, Jackson went through a period of two and a half years in which she was unable to find acting work. She unsuccessfully auditioned for the Royal Shakespeare Company (RSC), and undertook what she later described as "a series of soul-destroying jobs". This included waitressing at The 2i's Coffee Bar, clerical work for a large City of London firm, answering phones for a theatrical agent, and a role at British Home Stores. She also worked as a Bluecoat at Butlin's Pwllheli holiday resort on the Llŷn Peninsula in North West Wales, where her new husband and fellow actor Roy Hodges was a Redcoat. Jackson eventually returned to repertory theatre in Dundee, but worked in bars in between acting jobs.

Jackson made her film debut in a bit part in the kitchen sink drama This Sporting Life (1963). A member of the RSC for four years from 1963, she originally joined for director Peter Brook's Theatre of Cruelty season, which included Peter Weiss's Marat/Sade (1965), in which she played an inmate of an insane asylum portraying Charlotte Corday, the assassin of Jean-Paul Marat. The production ran on Broadway in 1965 and in Paris (Jackson also appeared in the 1967 film version). She appeared as Ophelia in Peter Hall's production of Hamlet the same year. Critic Penelope Gilliatt thought Jackson was the only Ophelia she had seen who was ready to play the Prince himself.

The RSC's staging at the Aldwych Theatre of US (1966), a protest play against the Vietnam War, also featured Jackson, and she appeared in its film version, Tell Me Lies. Later that year, she starred in the psychological drama Negatives (1968), which was not a huge financial success, but won her more good reviews.

=== 1969–1980: Breakthrough and acclaim ===
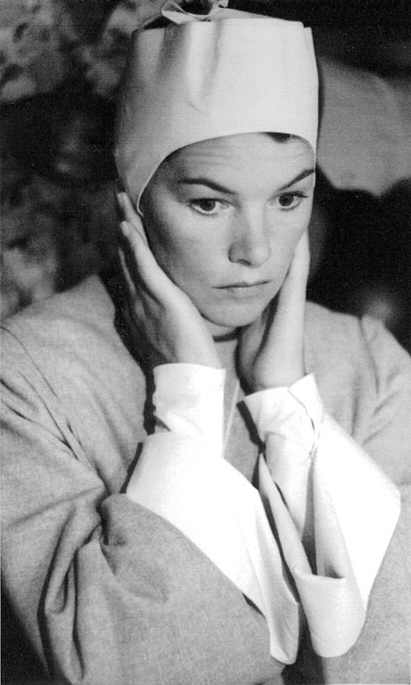
Jackson in a trailer for The Devil Is a Woman (1973)

Jackson's starring role in Ken Russell's film adaptation of D. H. Lawrence's Women in Love (1969) led to her first Academy Award for Best Actress. Brian McFarlane, the main author of The Encyclopedia of British Film, wrote: "Her blazing intelligence, sexual challenge and abrasiveness were at the service of a superbly written role in a film with a passion rare in the annals of British cinema." In the process of gaining funding for The Music Lovers (1970) from United Artists, Russell explained it as "the story of a homosexual who marries a nymphomaniac", the couple being the composer Pyotr Ilyich Tchaikovsky (Richard Chamberlain) and Antonina Miliukova, played by Jackson. The film received mixed reviews in the US; the anonymous reviewer in Variety wrote of the two principals, "Their performances are more dramatically bombastic than sympathetic, or sometimes even believable." The Music Lovers was a box-office success in Europe, reaching No. 1 in the UK's weekly rankings in March 1971. It was the first of four films starring Jackson which topped the box-office charts in the UK. Jackson was initially interested in the role of Sister Jeanne in The Devils (1971), Russell's next film, but turned it down after script rewrites and deciding that she did not wish to play a third neurotic character in a row.

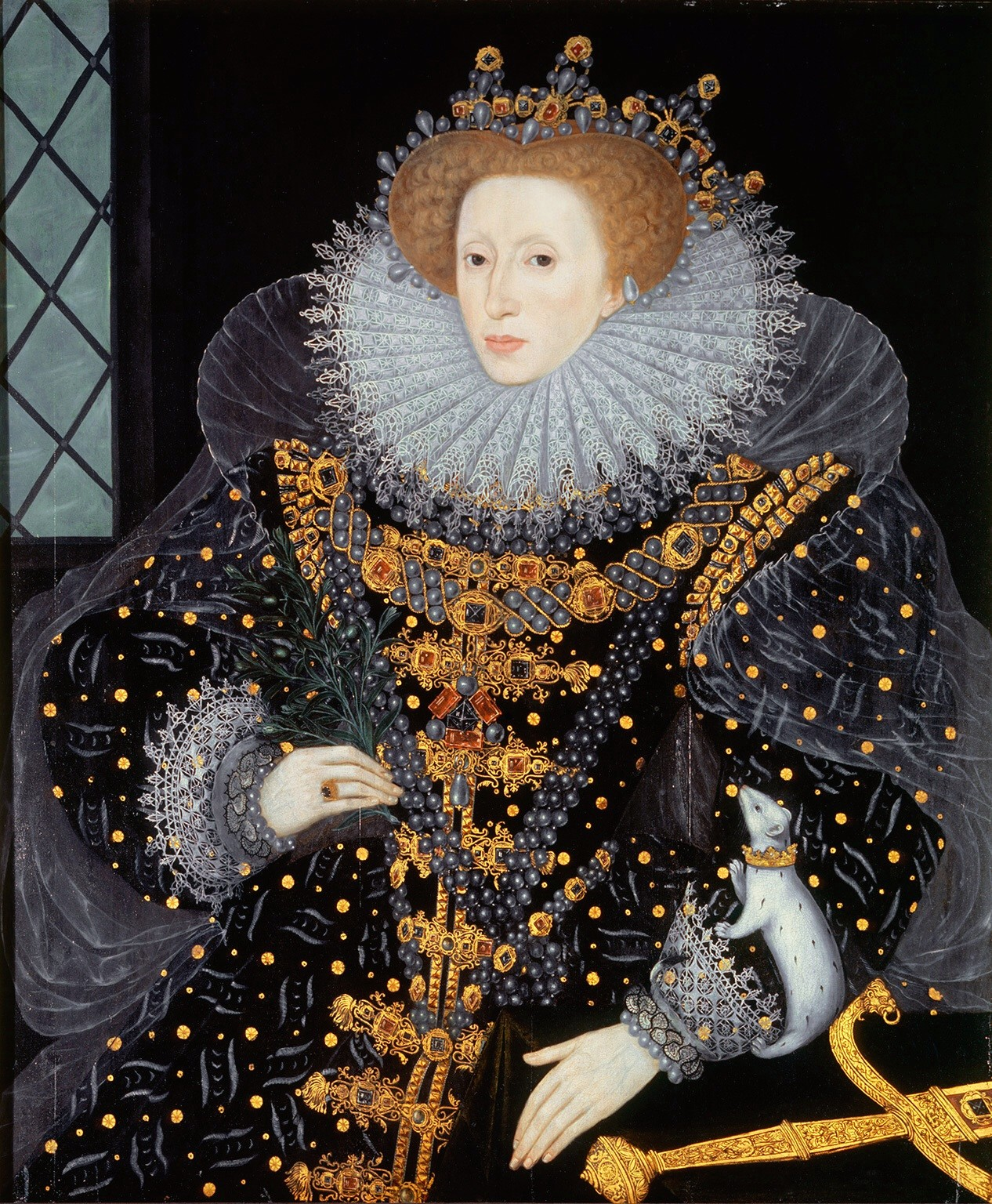
Jackson portrayed Queen Elizabeth I in the BBC serial Elizabeth R (1971), earning two Primetime Emmy Awards for the role

Jackson had her head shaved to play Queen Elizabeth I in the BBC's serial Elizabeth R (1971). After the series aired on PBS in the US, she received two Primetime Emmy Awards for her performance. She also played Queen Elizabeth in the film Mary, Queen of Scots; and gained an Academy Award nomination as well as a BAFTA Award for her role in John Schlesinger's Sunday Bloody Sunday (both 1971). In July, Sunday Bloody Sunday topped the UK box-office charts for two weeks. That year, British exhibitors voted her the sixth most popular star at the British box office. Jackson's popularity was such that 1971 saw her receive Best Film Actress awards from the Variety Club of Great Britain (who also rewarded her similarly in 1975 and 1978), the New York Film Critics and the US National Society of Film Critics. Mary, Queen of Scots was premièred in December 1971 in Los Angeles and was the 1972 Royal Film Performance in Britain, attended by the Queen Mother, Princess Margaret and Lord Snowdon. The film reached No. 1 in the UK box-office charts in April that year, a position it held for five consecutive weeks.

Jackson made the first of several appearances with Morecambe and Wise in their 1971 Christmas special. Appearing in a comedy sketch as Cleopatra for the BBC Morecambe and Wise Show, she delivered the line, "All men are fools and what makes them so is having beauty like what I have got." Her later appearances included a song-and-dance routine (where she was pushed offstage by Eric), a period drama about Queen Victoria, and another musical routine (in their Thames Television series) where she was elevated ten feet in the air by a misbehaving swivel chair. Jackson and Wise also appeared in a 1981 information film for the Blood Transfusion Service.

Filmmaker Melvin Frank saw Jackson's comedy skills in the Morecambe and Wise Show and offered her the lead female role in his romantic comedy A Touch of Class (1973), co-starring George Segal, which was a UK box-office No. 1 in June 1973. In February 1974, Jackson's role in the film won her the Academy Award for Best Actress. She continued to work in the theatre, returning to the RSC for the lead in Henrik Ibsen's Hedda Gabler. A later film version directed by Trevor Nunn was released as Hedda (1975), for which Jackson was nominated for an Oscar. In The New York Times, Vincent Canby wrote: "This version of Hedda Gabler is all Miss Jackson's Hedda and, I must say, great fun to watch ... Miss Jackson's technical virtuosity is particularly suited to a character like Hedda. Her command of her voice and her body, as well as the Jackson mannerisms, have the effect of separating the actress from the character in a very curious way."

In 1978, she starred in the romantic comedy House Calls, co-starring Walter Matthau, with the film spending two weeks at No. 1 in the US box-office rankings. House Calls was the biggest box-office hit of her career in the United States. That year, she was awarded a CBE. In 1979, she reunited with her A Touch of Class colleagues Segal and Frank for the romantic comedy Lost and Found. Jackson and Matthau teamed again in the comedy Hopscotch (1980), which debuted at No. 1 in its opening weekend at the US box office, also spending its second week in the top spot.

=== 1980–1991: Established actor ===
For her 1980 appearance on The Muppet Show, Jackson told the producers she would perform any material they liked. In her appearance, she has a delusion that she is a pirate captain who takes over the Muppet Theatre as her ship. Fifteen years after the New York engagement of Marat/Sade, Jackson returned to Broadway in Andrew Davies's Rose (1981) opposite Jessica Tandy; both actresses received Tony nominations for their roles. In September 1983, The Glenda Jackson Theatre in Birkenhead was named in her honour. The theatre was attached to Wirral Metropolitan College, but demolished in 2005 following the establishment of a purpose-built site for students.

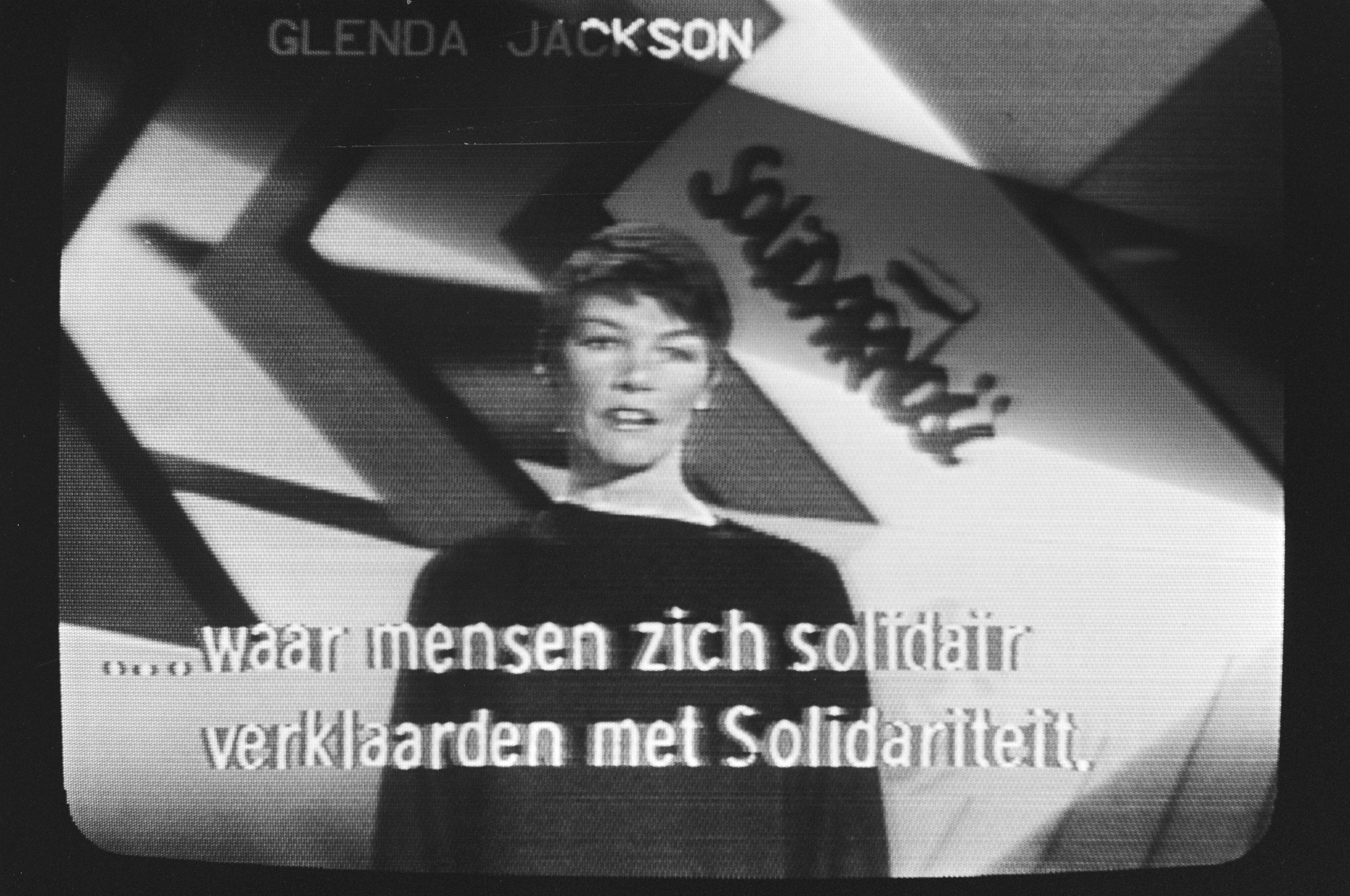
Jackson on Let Poland be Poland (1982)

In 1985, she played Nina Leeds in a revival of Eugene O'Neill's Strange Interlude at the Nederlander Theatre in a production which had originated in London the previous year and ran for eight weeks. John Beaufort for The Christian Science Monitor wrote: "Bravura is the inevitable word for Miss Jackson's display of feminine wiles and brilliant technique." Frank Rich in The New York Times thought Jackson, "with her helmet of hair and gashed features", when Leeds is a young woman, "looks like a cubist portrait of Louise Brooks", and later when the character has aged several decades, is "mesmerizing as a Zelda Fitzgeraldesque neurotic, a rotting and spiteful middle-aged matron and, finally, a spent, sphinx-like widow happily embracing extinction." Herbert Wise directed the drama on television where it was first broadcast in the US as part of PBS's American Playhouse in 1988.

In November 1984, Jackson appeared in the title role of Robert David MacDonald's English translation of Racine's Phèdre, titled Phedra, at The Old Vic. The play was designed and directed by Philip Prowse, and Robert Eddison played Theramenes. The Daily Telegraph's John Barber wrote of her performance, "Wonderfully impressive ... The actress finds a voice as jagged and hoarse as her torment". Benedict Nightingale in the New Statesman was intrigued that Jackson did not go in for nobility, but played Racine's feverish queen as if to say that "being skewered in the guts by Cupid is an ugly, bitter, humiliating business". The costume which Prowse designed for Jackson's performance is in the Victoria and Albert Museum, and iconic photographs of Jackson in the role can be found online.

In 1989, Jackson appeared in Ken Russell's The Rainbow, playing Anna Brangwen, mother of Gudrun, the part for which she had won her first Academy Award twenty years earlier. The same year, she played Martha in a Los Angeles production of Edward Albee's Who's Afraid of Virginia Woolf? at the Doolittle Theatre (now the Ricardo Montalbán Theatre). Directed by the playwright himself, this staging featured John Lithgow as George. Dan Sullivan in the Los Angeles Times wrote that Jackson and Lithgow performed "with the assurance of dedicated character assassins, not your hire-and-salary types" with the actors being able to display their character's capacity for antipathy. Albee was disappointed with this production, pointing to Jackson, who he thought "had retreated back to the thing she can do very well, that ice cold performance. I don't know whether she got scared, but in rehearsal she was being Martha, and the closer we got to opening the less Martha she was!" She performed the lead role in Howard Barker's Scenes from an Execution as Galactia, a sixteenth-century female Venetian artist, at the Almeida Theatre in 1990. It was an adaptation of Barker's 1984 radio play in which Jackson had played the same role.

=== 2015–2023: Return to acting ===
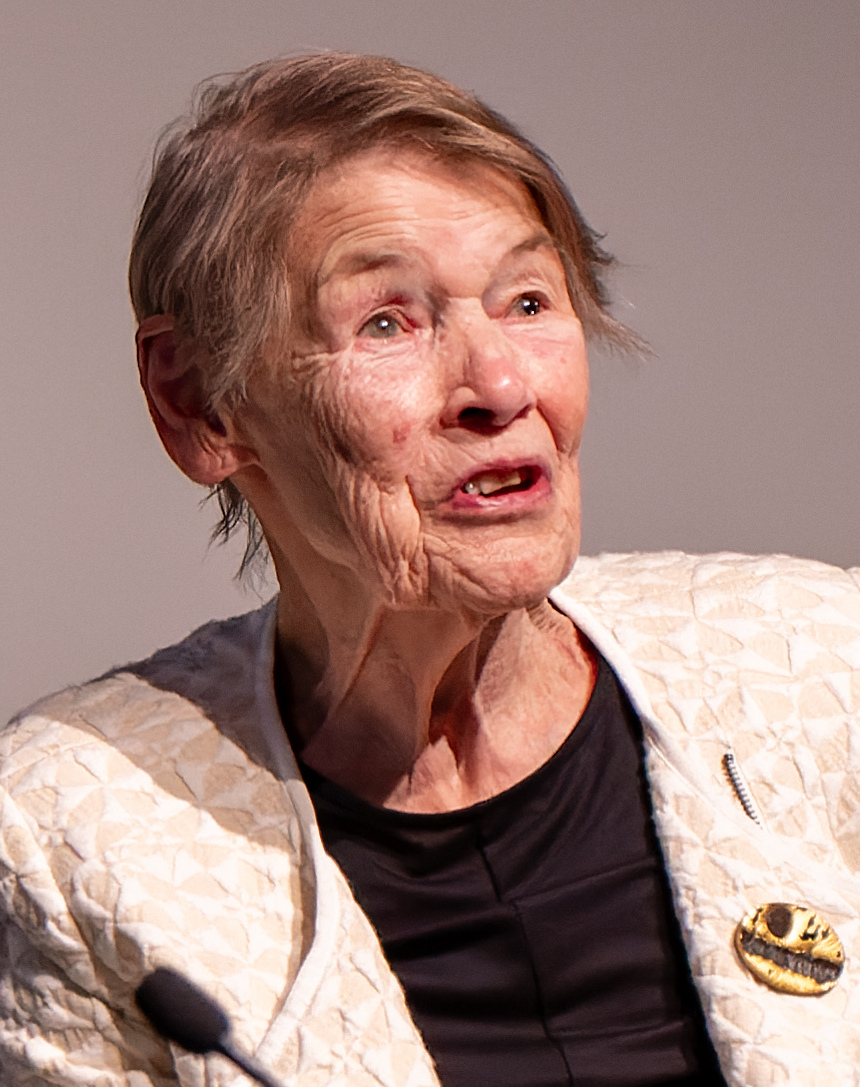
Jackson at BFI London in 2022

In 2015, Jackson returned to acting following a 23-year absence, having retired from politics. She took the lead role of Dide, the ancient matriarch, in Blood, Sex and Money, a radio drama series based on the Les Rougon-Macquart novel series by Émile Zola and aired on Radio 4 from November 2015 to October 2016. She returned to the stage at the end of 2016, playing the title role in William Shakespeare's King Lear at the Old Vic Theatre in London, in a production running from 25 October to 3 December. Jackson was nominated for Best Actress at the Olivier Awards for her performance but ultimately lost out to Billie Piper. She won the Natasha Richardson Award for Best Actress at the 2017 Evening Standard Theatre Awards for her performance. Dominic Cavendish of The Telegraph wrote, "Glenda Jackson is tremendous as King Lear. No ifs, no buts. In returning to the stage at the age of 80, 25 years after her last performance (as the Clytemnestra-like Christine in Eugene O'Neill's Mourning Becomes Electra at the Glasgow Citizens), she has pulled off one of those 11th-hour feats of human endeavour that will surely be talked about for years to come by those who see it."

In 2018, Jackson returned to Broadway in a revival of Edward Albee's Three Tall Women acting alongside Laurie Metcalf and Allison Pill. The role earned her the Tony Award for Best Actress in a Play. Marilyn Stasio of Variety wrote, "Watching Glenda Jackson in theatrical flight is like looking straight into the sun. Her expressive face registers her thoughts while guarding her feelings. But it's the voice that really thrills. Deeply pitched and clarion clear, it's the commanding voice of stern authority. Don't mess with this household god or she'll turn you to stone." Jackson returned to the title role of King Lear on Broadway in a production that opened in April 2019. Director Sam Gold described her portrayal of Lear in The New York Times Magazine: "She is going to go through something most people don't go through. You're all invited. Glenda Jackson is going to endure this, and you're going to witness it." In 2019, after a 27-year absence, Jackson returned to television drama, portraying an elderly grandmother struggling with dementia in Elizabeth Is Missing on BBC One, based on the novel of the same name by Emma Healey, for which she won the BAFTA TV Award for Best Actress and International Emmy Award for Best Actress. From February 2020 to January 2022, she starred in the lead role of Constance Sterling in the radio drama series Fault Lines: Money, Sex and Blood for Radio 4, another adaptation of Les Rougon-Macquart.

In February 2021, it was reported that Jackson would star with Michael Caine in The Great Escaper, a film telling the true story of Bernard Jordan's escape from his care home to commemorate the 70th anniversary of the D-Day landings in France. Caine would play Jordan, with Jackson as his wife Rene. Caine and Jackson previously starred together in The Romantic Englishwoman (1975). Jackson had completed filming on The Great Escaper in September 2022; it was to be her last film. It was released on 6 October 2023. In July 2022, the British Film Institute celebrated her film and television career with a month-long retrospective season at the BFI Southbank in London. As well as screenings of her work, the programme included Glenda Jackson in Conversation, in which she was interviewed about her career live on stage by broadcaster John Wilson.

== Political career ==
Jackson joined the Labour Party in the early 1950s, at the age of 16. Her earlier campaigns were not party political. In 1978, she was one of the public figures who lent their name as a sponsor to the Anti-Nazi League. The same year, she appeared in a print advertisement for Oxfam. Jackson was on the executive of the National Association of Voluntary Hostels, and spoke at rallies for the housing charity Shelter. Human rights were also an area of interest, and she joined a demonstration outside the Indonesian Embassy to protest against the detention of political prisoners. She was involved in children's charities, as president of the Toy Libraries Association and as a programme narrator for UNICEF. She also gave time and money to a home for emotionally disturbed children in Berkshire run by former actress Coral Atkins.

Jackson was a supporter of the National Abortion Campaign, and organised a benefit evening for them at the Cambridge Theatre, which raised over £3,000. She also supported Una Kroll's Women's Rights candidacy for Sutton and Cheam in the October 1974 United Kingdom general election. In addition, Jackson made several appearances on BBC Radio 4's Any Questions? debate programme during this period of her career. She had considered becoming a social worker, and in 1979 began a social science degree at the Open University, but dropped out a few months later after falling behind with her essays. Jackson appeared in a number of charity films, including a production on behalf of International Year of the Child, Voluntary Service Overseas, and Oxfam. Other such films featured her campaigning against polio and the arms trade.

=== Labour Party ===
Jackson's name was linked to several parliamentary seats over the years; she was approached by a Constituency Labour Party (CLP) in Bristol to stand at the 1979 general election, but this did not materialise. (Note: Jackson "was approached by a member of the Bristol Labour Party to stand for Parliament in what was a safe Tory constituency." This is most likely to have been Bristol West, as it was the only Conservative-held seat in Bristol prior to the 1979 general election.) An approach was also made to her about the possibility of being a candidate for the marginal Welsh seat of Bridgend at the 1983 general election, which she turned down to pursue a humanities degree at Thames Polytechnic. Though she was seen in the refectory at Thames a few times, she dropped out before starting the course. In that election, she supported Paul Boateng and Ian Wilson, Labour's candidates for Hertfordshire West and Watford, respectively. She was also a member of the Arts for Labour group.

In 1986, Jackson visited Ethiopia as part of Oxfam's efforts to help with the famine there, and in 1989 she approached Voluntary Service Overseas about the chance of working in Africa for a couple of years. She got involved in the African National Congress campaign against apartheid in South Africa, and in September 1988 chaired a United Nations committee on the cultural boycott. Jackson appeared in a party political broadcast for Labour in February 1987. In June, she was present at a campaign rally with the then Labour leader Neil Kinnock for the 1987 general election.

In December 1989, it was rumoured that Jackson had been approached by two branches of Leeds East CLP to succeed their Labour MP, Denis Healey. According to her biographer Chris Bryant, she turned down this opportunity. In late 1989, two members of Hampstead and Highgate CLP got in touch with Jackson about the possibility of standing there. Despite having never been to a Labour ward meeting, she won over the local party, and triumphed in the ballot, which took place on 28 March 1990. Jackson defeated three candidates who were all politically to her left: Kate Allen (Ken Livingstone's partner and a Camden councillor), economic history lecturer Sarah Palmer (daughter of former Labour MP Arthur Palmer) and Maureen Robinson, a previous Mayor of Camden.

Jackson later stated that she felt Britain was being "destroyed" by the policies of the then prime minister of the United Kingdom, Margaret Thatcher, and the Conservative government, so that she was willing to do "anything that was legal" to oppose them. In November 1990, Thatcher stood down as prime minister and leader of the Conservative Party. On Thatcher's death, Jackson protested Parliament's tributes to that legacy.

=== In Parliament ===
Jackson retired from acting in 1991 to devote herself to politics full-time as the prospective parliamentary candidate for Hampstead and Highgate. Although her party did not win the 1992 general election, as had been speculated, there was an above average swing to Labour in her constituency, and she gained the seat, narrowly beating the Conservative candidate Oliver Letwin, a former adviser to Thatcher. Jackson, whose campaign had been sponsored by the train drivers' union, ASLEF, was the first of Labour's 1992 intake to join the front bench when she became shadow transport minister in July 1996.

Following Labour's landslide victory in the 1997 general election, which saw her comfortably re-elected, she was appointed as a junior minister in the government of Tony Blair, with responsibility in the London Regional Transport. She resigned from the post in 1999 before an unsuccessful attempt to be nominated as the Labour candidate for the election of the first mayor of London in the 2000 London mayoral election. In the 2000 London Labour Party mayoral selection, she came a distant third behind Frank Dobson and Ken Livingstone, being eliminated in the first round of voting with 4.4% of the total. Jackson was once again re-elected to represent her constituency at the 2001 general election.

As a high-profile backbencher, Jackson became a regular critic of Blair over his plans to introduce higher education tuition fees in England, Wales, and Northern Ireland. She also called for him to resign following the Judicial Enquiry by Lord Hutton in 2003 surrounding the reasons for going to war in Iraq and the death of government adviser David Kelly. At the subsequent 2005 general election, she held her seat, albeit with a reduced majority and a swing to the Conservatives, who had selected local councillor Piers Wauchope. By October 2005, her disagreements with Blair's leadership swelled to a point where she threatened to challenge the prime minister as a stalking horse candidate in a leadership contest if he did not stand down within a reasonable amount of time. On 31 October 2006, Jackson was one of 12 Labour MPs to back Plaid Cymru and the Scottish National Party's call for an inquiry into the Iraq War.

Her constituency boundaries changed for the 2010 general election. The Gospel Oak and Highgate wards became part of Holborn and St Pancras, and the new Hampstead and Kilburn constituency took in territory from Brent to include Brondesbury, Kilburn and Queens Park wards (from the old Brent East and Brent South seats). On 6 May 2010, Jackson was elected as the MP for the new Hampstead and Kilburn constituency by a margin of 42 votes over Conservative Chris Philp, with the Liberal Democrat candidate Edward Fordham less than a thousand votes behind them. She had the closest result in England, and the second smallest majority of any MP at the 2010 election. Jackson's seat was marginal for most of her time in politics, with the 1997 election being the only occasion on which she received an absolute majority of votes cast in the constituency.

In June 2011, Jackson announced that, presuming the UK Parliament elected in 2010 lasted until 2015, she would not seek re-election. She stated: "I will be almost 80 and by then it will be time for someone else to have a turn." The eventual election was held two days before her 79th birthday, 23 years after she had first entered the House of Commons. In April 2012, the London Evening Standard reported that, in 2007–2008 she claimed £136,793 in allowances despite turning up for only 27 per cent of votes and speaking in just two debates, and that in 2011 she had to repay more than £8,000 in expenses she had wrongly claimed.

On 10 April 2013, Jackson delivered a speech in the House of Commons following the death of Margaret Thatcher, which subsequently went viral. She accused Thatcherism of treating "vices as virtues" and stated that, because of Thatcherism, the UK was susceptible to unprecedented unemployment rates and homelessness, chronically underfunded schools and public services, and the closure of mental hospitals. Another speech of Jackson's went viral in June 2014 when she gave a scathing assessment of Iain Duncan Smith's tenure as Work and Pensions Secretary, telling him that he was responsible for the "destruction of the welfare state and the total and utter incompetence of his department".

=== Views ===
Jackson was a borderline socialist, and was generally considered to be a traditional leftist during her political career, often disagreeing with the dominant Blairite governing Third Way faction in the Labour Party; she rebelled against her party in parliamentary votes on a number of occasions. She was also opposed to the politics of Arthur Scargill and the Militant tendency that dominated the party's battles in the 1980s. Jackson labelled Militant and Derek Hatton's politics as "self-indulgent crap", and she sent leader Neil Kinnock a congratulatory telegram after his high-profile 1985 Labour Party Conference speech, in which he criticised the activities of Militant and their allies. Jackson opposed the British monarchy, and was a republican. The Guardian's Simon Hattenstone summed up Jackson's views as "traditional Labour, solidarity, feminism". Jackson had been an outspoken feminist, criticising the lack of gender equality for women.

In the 1992 Labour Party leadership election, Jackson supported the successful candidate, John Smith. In the 1994 leadership election, she backed Tony Blair, who won the contest and subsequently became prime minister. Jackson voiced her support for Blair's successor Gordon Brown as prime minister in 2008. Brown appeared with Jackson on a campaign visit for the 2010 general election, with him describing her as "a very close friend". In the 2010 leadership election, with Brown having stood down, Jackson voted for David Miliband, considered to be more of a political moderate than his younger brother, Ed Miliband, a figure on the party's soft left who was ultimately elected as party leader. Following her departure from Parliament, the Labour Party elected Jeremy Corbyn as its leader. Jackson stated that she supported him "as a person", and would have nominated him in the 2015 leadership election. She qualified her support, adding: "Never in a million years would I have voted for him, though."

In the 1975 United Kingdom European Communities membership referendum, Jackson voted against Britain continuing in the European Economic Community. She subsequently changed her mind on the issue, and supported Britain remaining in the European Union in the 2016 Brexit referendum. Despite this, she disagreed with calls for a second vote, such as by People's Vote. To this effect, she stated her admiration for the then prime minister Theresa May; when this subject matter was queried by the interviewer, The Guardian's Emma Brockes, Jackson responded: "I've certainly admired her in the way she has handled herself over Brexit, yes! I do admire her for her tenacity, trying to deliver the referendum result to the people of our country, even though I disapproved of it."

Interviewed in July 2020, shortly after Keir Starmer had taken over as party leader from Corbyn, Jackson declared herself happy with him in the role. In July 2022, she commented on Starmer, saying: "I just wish Keir would get someone to help him develop his voice." She called it "one of his big drawbacks". That same month, she said that Parliament had not been welcoming to women when she was voted in during the 1992 general election.

== Personal life ==
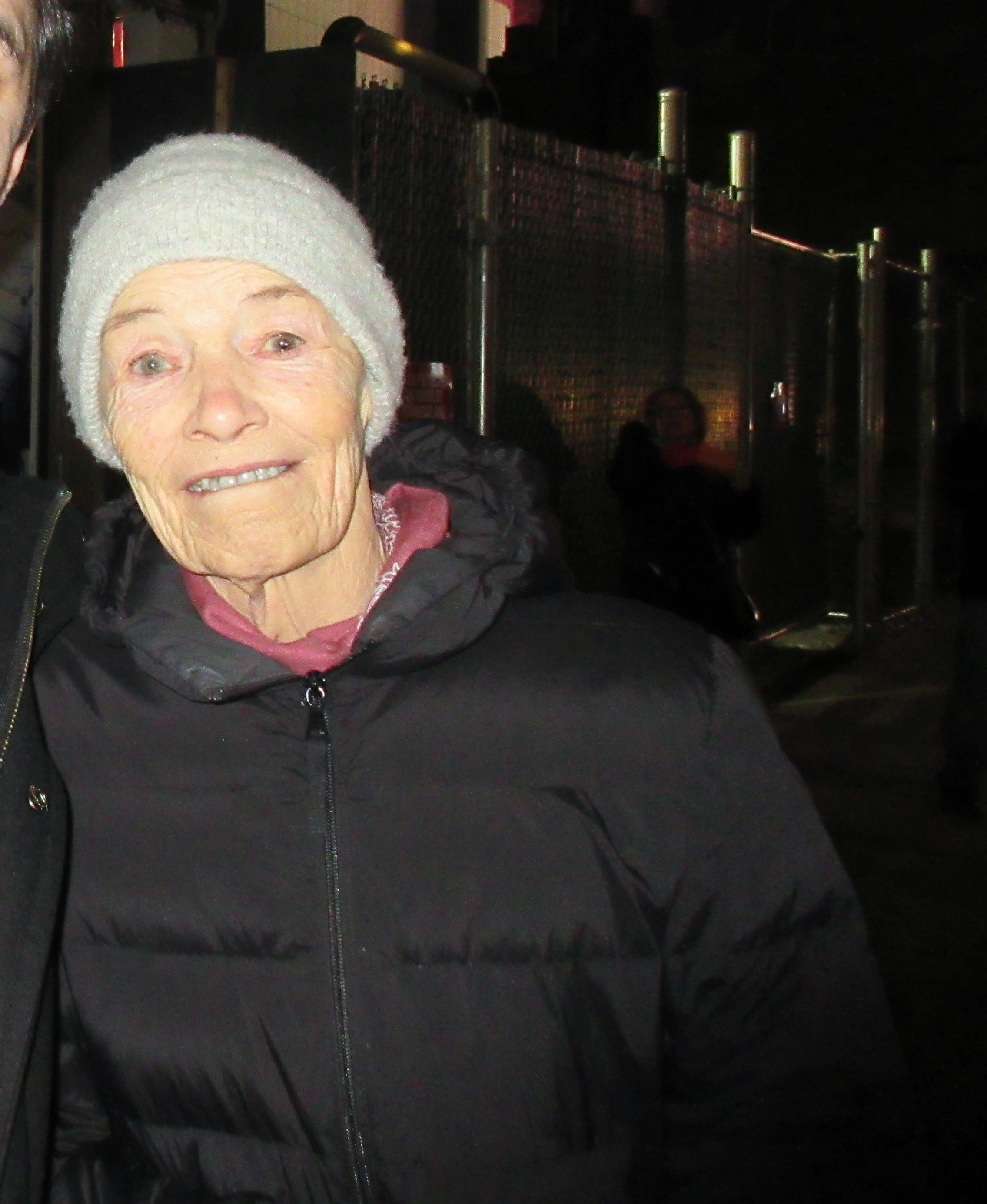
Jackson on Broadway, March 2019

=== Marriage and relationships ===
In 1957, Jackson met Roy Hodges, a stage manager and fellow actor in their repertory theatre company. The pair soon embarked upon a relationship. Jackson and Hodges were married on 2 August 1958 at St Marylebone Register Office in London. Their son, Dan, was born in 1969; Jackson was six months pregnant when filming on Women in Love was completed. Daniel is a former Labour Party adviser and commentator, who works as a newspaper columnist for The Mail on Sunday. When told by her son that he was going to write for a Conservative newspaper, Jackson replied, "Well, I'll have to emigrate!"

Jackson's marriage was running into difficulties by the early 1970s, and in 1975, she began an affair with Andy Phillips, the lighting director for the production of Hedda Gabler in which she was starring at the time. Hodges sued Jackson for divorce on the grounds of her adultery with Phillips in November that year, and they were divorced in 1976. Jackson and Phillips were in an on-off relationship until 1981. It was reported in 2016 that she had been "happily single for decades".

=== Interests ===
During the early years of her career, Jackson and her husband lived in Swiss Cottage, northwest London, an area she would later represent as an MP. In the late 1960s, the pair moved to Blackheath, southeast London. Later, she lived in a basement granny flat there, with her son, daughter-in-law and grandson upstairs. Jackson listed her interests in Who's Who as cooking, gardening and reading Jane Austen.

=== Death ===
Jackson died at her Blackheath home on 15 June 2023, at the age of 87 following a brief illness. In tribute to Jackson, on the day of her death, the BBC broadcast a repeat of her interview with John Wilson first shown in an edition of This Cultural Life in October 2022, followed by the 2019 drama Elizabeth Is Missing.

== Acting credits and accolades ==
=== Commonwealth honours ===
Commonwealth honours

Country	Date	Appointment	Post-nominal letters
United Kingdom	1978–	Commander of the Order of the British Empire (Civil Division)	CBE

=== Scholastic ===
Chancellor, visitor, governor, rector and fellowships

Location	Date	School	Position
England		Liverpool John Moores University	Honorary Fellow

=== Honorary degrees ===
Location	Date	School	Degree	Status
England	9 July 1978	University of Liverpool	Doctor of Letters (D.Litt.)	
United States	1981	University of Scranton	Doctorate	
England	1987	Keele University	Doctor of Letters (D.Litt.)	
England	1988	University of Exeter	Doctor of Letters (D.Litt.)	
England	1992	University of Nottingham	Doctor of Letters (D.Litt.)	
England	1992	Durham University	Doctor of Letters (D.Litt.)	

== Notes ==
Parliament of the United Kingdom
Preceded by Geoffrey Finsberg	Member of Parliament for Hampstead and Highgate; 1992–2010	Constituency abolished
New constituency	Member of Parliament for Hampstead and Kilburn; 2010–2015	Succeeded by Tulip Siddiq
