= Statistics of the COVID-19 pandemic =

Statistics of the COVID-19 pandemic may refer to:

- COVID-19 pandemic in Afghanistan
- COVID-19 pandemic in Albania
- COVID-19 pandemic in Algeria
- COVID-19 pandemic in Argentina
- Statistics of the COVID-19 pandemic in Australia
- COVID-19 pandemic in Austria
- COVID-19 pandemic in the Bahamas
- COVID-19 pandemic in Bangladesh
- COVID-19 pandemic in Belgium
- COVID-19 pandemic in Bolivia
- COVID-19 pandemic in Bosnia and Herzegovina
- Statistics of the COVID-19 pandemic in Brazil
- COVID-19 pandemic in Bulgaria
- COVID-19 pandemic in Cambodia
- COVID-19 pandemic in Canada
- Statistics of the COVID-19 pandemic in Chile
- Statistics of the COVID-19 pandemic in mainland China
- COVID-19 pandemic in Colombia
- COVID-19 pandemic in Costa Rica
- COVID-19 pandemic in Croatia
- COVID-19 pandemic in the Dominican Republic
- COVID-19 pandemic in Ecuador
- COVID-19 pandemic in Finland
- COVID-19 pandemic in France
- COVID-19 pandemic in French Polynesia
- Statistics of the COVID-19 pandemic in Germany
- COVID-19 pandemic in Ghana
- COVID-19 pandemic in Greece
- COVID-19 pandemic in Hungary
- Statistics of the COVID-19 pandemic in India
- Statistics of the COVID-19 pandemic in Indonesia
- COVID-19 pandemic in Iraq
- Statistics of the COVID-19 pandemic in Italy
- COVID-19 pandemic in Jamaica
- Statistics of the COVID-19 pandemic in Japan
- COVID-19 pandemic in Kosovo
- COVID-19 pandemic in Kyrgyzstan
- COVID-19 pandemic in Laos
- Statistics of the COVID-19 pandemic in Malaysia
- COVID-19 pandemic in Mexico
- COVID-19 pandemic in Mongolia
- COVID-19 pandemic in Montenegro
- COVID-19 pandemic in Morocco
- COVID-19 pandemic in Myanmar
- COVID-19 pandemic in Namibia
- COVID-19 pandemic in Nepal
- COVID-19 pandemic in the Netherlands
- COVID-19 pandemic in Nigeria
- COVID-19 pandemic in Norfolk Island (Australia)
- COVID-19 pandemic in Norway
- Statistics of the COVID-19 pandemic in Pakistan
- COVID-19 pandemic in the State of Palestine
- COVID-19 pandemic in Papua New Guinea
- Statistics of the COVID-19 pandemic in Peru
- COVID-19 pandemic in the Philippines
- Statistics of the COVID-19 pandemic in Poland
- Statistics of the COVID-19 pandemic in Portugal
- COVID-19 pandemic in Romania
- Statistics of the COVID-19 pandemic in Russia
- Statistics of the COVID-19 pandemic in Serbia
- Statistics of the COVID-19 pandemic in Singapore
- COVID-19 pandemic in Slovakia
- COVID-19 pandemic in Sri Lanka
- COVID-19 pandemic in South Korea
- COVID-19 pandemic in Suriname
- COVID-19 pandemic in Svalbard (Norway)
- COVID-19 pandemic in Syria
- Statistics of the COVID-19 pandemic in Tamil Nadu (India)
- Statistics of the COVID-19 pandemic in Thailand
- COVID-19 pandemic in Timor-Leste (East Timor)
- COVID-19 pandemic in Tunisia
- COVID-19 pandemic in Ukraine
- Statistics of the COVID-19 pandemic in the United Kingdom
- Statistics of the COVID-19 pandemic in the United States
- COVID-19 pandemic in Uruguay
- COVID-19 pandemic in Uzbekistan
- COVID-19 pandemic in Venezuela
- COVID-19 pandemic in Vietnam
- COVID-19 pandemic in Yemen
