= Statistics of the COVID-19 pandemic in Peru =

This article presents official statistics gathered during the COVID-19 pandemic in Peru.

Graph of cases and deaths on a logarithmic scale.

== Maps ==
Departments with confirmed COVID-19 cases.

Confirmed cases of COVID-19 per 100,000 inhabitants by departments.

Cases by department according to the regional health authority (Diresa and Geresa).

Confirmed cases of COVID-19 in Peru by province.

Confirmed cases of COVID-19 per 100,000 inhabitants in Peru by province.

Confirmed deaths by COVID-19 in Peru.

Confirmed deaths by COVID-19 per 100,000 inhabitants.

Tests made for every 100,000 inhabitants in Peru by department.

Confirmed cases in districts of Lima and Callao.

Confirmed cases for every 100,000 inhabitants in the districts of Lima and Callao.

Map of confirmed deaths in Lima and Callao.

Confirmed deaths for every 100,000 inhabitants in the districts of Lima and Callao

Departments with targeted quarantine, according to the General Directorate of Epidemiology.

Administered vaccine by departments.

== By department ==
Note: The Regional Directorate of Health (DIRESA, acronym in Spanish) and the Regional Health Management (GERESA, acronym in Spanish) are health authorities belonging to each regional government (departments) except the province of Lima which is administered by the Ministry of Health, these health authorities have regional autonomy by which show different figures than the reports of the Ministry of Health.

COVID-19 pandemic in Peru by region
	Province	MINSA		DIRESA/GERESA/DIRIS		
	Province	Cases	Deaths	Cases	Deaths	Ref.
(Peru)	Peru	3,590,882	213,324			
	Amazonas			50,318	1,333	
	Ancash			144,211	5,994	
	Apurímac			51,022	1,113	
	Arequipa			390,887	6,997	
	Ayacucho			65,152	1,881	
	Cajamarca			123,397	3,063	
	Callao					
	Cusco			194,837	4,527	
	Huancavelica			45,093	858	
	Huánuco					
	Ica			111,618	6,022	
Junin	Junín			171,717	5,695	
	La Libertad					
Lambayeque Department	Lambayeque					
	Lima (P)					
	Lima (R)					
	Loreto					
Madre de Dios Department	Madre de Dios					
	Moquegua			79,897	1,469—1,470	
Pasco Department	Pasco					
	Piura					
	Puno			90,162	3,071	
	San Martín			73,386	2,237	
	Tacna			66,031	1,853	
	Tumbes					
	Ucayali			54,779	2,664	
Updated: June 13, 2022

== Summary table ==
Registry of confirmed cases, recovered, deaths and tests by COVID-19 in Peru
Date	Active cases	Total cases	Recovered	Deaths	Hospitalisations		PCR	Serology	Antigenic	Total tests
Date	Active cases	Total cases	Recovered	Deaths	Cml	ICU	PCR	Serology	Antigenic	Total tests
2020-03-06	1	1	-	-	-	-	155	-	-	155
2020-04-01	829	1,323	447	47	198	56	15,587	-	-	15,587
2020-05-01	28,206	40,459	11,129	1,124	5,287	658	60,381	282,117	-	342,498
2020-06-01	96,898	170,039	68,507	4,634	8,868	975	145,625	931,034	-	1,076,659
2020-07-01	100,372	288,477	178,245	9,860	11,108	1,212	252,738	1,446,631	-	1,699,369
2020-08-01	111,940	422,183	290,835	19,408	13,700	1,416	388,527	1,989,421	-	2,377,948
2020-09-01	156,462	657,129	471,599	29,068	12,162	1,493	595,226	2,637,808	-	3,233,034
2020-10-01	95,234	818,297	690,528	32,535	7,511	1,353	n/a	n/a	-	3,908,125
2020-11-01	42,769	904,911	827,613	34,529	5,270	1,041	1,028,303	3,509,237	-	4,537,540
2020-12-01	32,219	965,228	896,978	36,031	4,022	958	1,271,584	3,814,191	-	5,085,775
2021-01-01	24,493	1,017,199	954,982	37,724	5,223	1,253	1,501,619	4,036,111	-	5,537,730
2021-02-01	44,390	1,142,716	1,057,145	41,181	12,376	1,855	1,918,961	4,260,126	175,153	6,354,240
2021-03-01	49,586	1,332,939	1,236,668	46,685	15,040	2,153	2,351,021	4,458,581	794,912	7,604,514
2021-04-01	32,780	1,561,723	1,476,782	52,161	13,514	2,065	2,905,822	4,645,563	1,843,114	9,394,499
2021-04-02	30,432	1,568,345	1,485,582	52,331	13,581	2,357	2,930,126	4,649,394	1,865,836	9,445,356
2021-04-03	29,284	1,573,961	1,492,052	52,625	13,357	2,373	2,947,615	4,652,684	1,882,931	9,483,230
2021-04-04	28,908	1,582,367	1,500,582	52,877	13,561	2,307	2,970,129	4,655,874	1,912,124	9,538,127
2021-04-05	27,578	1,590,209	1,509,493	53,138	13,650	2,348	2,993,718	4,658,386	1,927,336	9,579,440
2021-04-06	26,406	1,598,593	1,518,776	53,411	14,066	2,452	3,015,808	4,663,041	1,962,182	9,641,031
2021-04-07	27,061	1,607,898	1,527,112	53,725	13,823	2,249	3,028,755	4,671,843	2,008,445	9,709,043
2021-04-08	26,801	1,617,864	1,537,085	53,978	13,622	2,246	3,056,123	4,676,818	2,057,803	9,790,744
2021-04-09	26,427	1,628,519	1,547,807	54,285	14,199	2,313	3,091,155	4,681,787	2,103,480	9,876,422
2021-04-10	27,319	1,639,767	1,557,779	54,669	14,943	2,321	3,112,131	4,687,725	2,145,876	9,945,732
2021-04-11	26,248	1,647,694	1,566,543	54,903	14,512	2,302	3,125,834	4,692,828	2,183,170	10,001,832
2021-04-12	22,848	1,653,320	1,575,242	55,230	15,238	2,073	3,133,773	4,694,484	2,198,213	10,026,470
2021-04-13	19,793	1,659,707	1,584,425	55,489	15,183	2,599	3,143,771	4,706,931	2,235,300	10,086,002
2021-04-14	18,988	1,667,737	1,592,937	55,812	15,074	2,615	3,157,030	4,718,999	2,282,814	10,158,843
2021-04-15	22,880	1,681,063	1,602,034	56,149	15,119	2,603	3,172,501	4,724,704	2,329,189	10,226,394
2021-04-16	22,034	1,689,051	1,610,563	56,454	14,976	2,591	3,191,863	4,730,154	2,373,542	10,295,559
2021-04-17	21,149	1,697,626	1,619,680	56,797	15,129	2,616	3,216,604	4,735,796	2,421,915	10,374,315
2021-04-18	19,558	1,704,757	1,627,969	57,230	14,747	2,636	3,232,404	4,739,582	2,463,455	10,435,441
2021-04-19	13,964	1,707,787	1,636,286	57,537	14,752	2,574	3,239,633	4,742,041	2,479,801	10,461,475
2021-04-20	16,034	1,719,088	1,645,100	57,954	15,547	2,580	3,252,596	4,747,846	2,523,977	10,524,419
2021-04-21	15,134	1,726,806	1,653,411	58,261	15,440	2,628	3,271,116	4,751,376	2,559,970	10,582,462
2021-04-22	14,210	1,734,606	1,661,792	58,604	15,301	2,614	3,288,347	4,756,679	2,605,821	10,650,847
2021-04-23	15,838	1,745,655	1,670,805	59,012	15,239	2,642	3,308,562	4,762,438	2,652,364	10,723,364
2021-04-24	15,611	1,754,150	1,679,099	59,440	15,258	2,646	3,330,591	4,767,954	2,699,753	10,798,298
2021-04-25	13,760	1,761,575	1,688,091	59,724	14,912	2,618	3,348,227	4,772,014	2,741,778	10,862,019
2021-04-26	Unreliable	1,768,186	1,714,995	60,013	15,104	2,628	3,366,230	4,774,570	2,758,391	10,899,191
2021-04-27	Unreliable	1,775,062	1,721,922	60,416	15,211	2,642	3,382,803	4,779,465	2,802,490	10,964,758
2021-04-28	Unreliable	1,783,339	1,728,662	60,742	15,111	2,633	3,401,686	4,784,780	2,851,136	11,037,602
2021-04-29	Unreliable	1,791,998	1,736,183	61,101	15,206	2,679	3,422,082	4,789,529	2,884,774	11,096,385
2021-04-30	Unreliable	1,799,445	1,741,861	61,477	14,701	2,652	3,444,869	4,795,542	2,929,119	11,169,530
2021-05-01	Unreliable	1,804,915	1,748,170	61,789	14,795	2,667	3,465,920	4,799,771	2,960,233	11,225,924

Note: References in the daily report are in the annex, at the beginning of this section.

== Demographics ==
Registry of cases and deaths by gender and age based on data from the "Datos Abiertos" platform provided by the Ministry of Health.

Cases and deaths by gender and age, registered on April 11, 2021
Year group	Male			Female			Total		
Year group	Cases	Deaths	Lethality	Cases	Deaths	Lethality	Cases	Deaths	Lethality
All ages	849,573	36,616	4.31%	798,121	18,287	2.29%	1,647,694	54,903	3.33%
0-9	20,797	105	0.50%	19,209	83	0.43%	40,006	188	0.47%
10-19	40,387	95	0.24%	45,756	84	0.18%	86,143	179	0.21%
20-29	144,616	380	0.26%	151,136	206	0.14%	295,752	586	0.20%
30-39	188,103	1,159	0.62%	177,571	574	0.32%	365,674	1,733	0.47%
40-49	167,171	3,254	1.95%	146,885	1,338	0.91%	314,056	4,592	1.46%
50-59	134,408	6,876	5.12%	119,110	2,761	2.32%	253,518	9,637	3.80%
60-69	86,412	9,855	11.40%	77,907	4,832	6.20%	164,319	14,687	8.94%
70-79	45,790	8,776	19.17%	39,771	4,488	11.28%	85,561	13,264	15.50%
80-89	18,666	5,100	27.32%	17,098	3,036	17.76%	35,764	8,136	22.75%
90+	2,999	1,016	33.88%	3,569	885	24.80%	6,568	1,901	28.94%
N/A	224	-	-	109	-	-	333	-	-
