= Statistics of the COVID-19 pandemic in Italy =

This article presents official statistics gathered during the COVID-19 pandemic in Italy.

== Statistics ==
=== Data quality issues ===
Deaths statistics for Italy include coronavirus deaths both in and outside of hospitals, and includes individuals tested pre-mortem as well as post-mortem. The statistics do not distinguish between individuals who died "with" or "of" the disease. The statistics thus include patients with pre-existing conditions, which made up 96% of the total death count. However, in regions where the healthcare system was overwhelmed by the pandemic (e.g. Lombardy), data suggests that the official death statistics likely missed a portion of the deaths outside hospitals. For example, in some areas of northern Italy, a comparison of the average registered deaths over the previous years with the deaths in the first months of 2020 showed a sizeable excess of deaths that were not officially included in the coronavirus toll. These numbers suggest, for example, that there were roughly 10,900 excess deaths in March of 2020 were not been reported as COVID-19 deaths.

European countries used different criteria to count coronavirus-related fatalities, and because of this, the Italian statistics can be difficult to compare. The statistics of some other European countries kept separate counts of cases where coronavirus was the only known medical ailment, thus often excluding deaths of people with pre-existing conditions. In addition to this, some European countries only reported fatalities occurring in hospitals.

=== Charts ===
The graphs show the development of the pandemic starting from 21 February 2020, the day when the Lombardy and Veneto clusters were first detected.
