= Statistics of the COVID-19 pandemic in Portugal =

== Statistics ==
COVID-19 Summary (12/4/2024)
Total confirmed cases	5,643,062 (+2,216)
Total confirmed deaths	28,126 (+14)
Active cases	219
Under surveillance	77,283 (+1,204)
Recovered	4,237,853 (+1,408)
Currently admitted to hospital	948 (+37)
Currently admitted to ICU	135 (+1)
Cases per 100 000 (national/continental)	410.4 / 413.9
R(t) (national/continental)	1.1 / 1.11

Vaccine summary (14/11/2021)
People with at least one vaccine dose	9 053 901 (87%)
People completely vaccinated	8 925 907 (86%)
Doses received	23 017 910
Doses distributed	17 211 348

Vaccination by age group
	At least one vaccine dose	Complete vaccination
0–17	562 026 (90%)	542 632 (87%)
18–24	729 806 (93%)	709 115 (91%)
25–49	3 203 605 (96%)	3 142 142 (94%)
50–64	2 171 685 (100%)	2 153 029 (99%)
65–79	1 689 071 (100%)	1 683 474 (100%)
⩾80	697 198 (100%)	695 354 (100%)

The following graphs show the evolution of the pandemic starting from 2 March 2020, the day the first cases were confirmed in the country.

=== Total confirmed cases by age and gender ===
The following chart displays the proportion of total cases by age and gender on August 20, 2021.

=== Severe cases ===
==== Total confirmed deaths by age and gender ====
The following chart displays the proportion of total deaths by age and gender on December 6, 2021.

=== Confirmed cases and deaths, by region ===
The following graph shows the daily cases of COVID-19 for each region of Portugal (updated on the 10th of June) according to DGS visualising the table above.

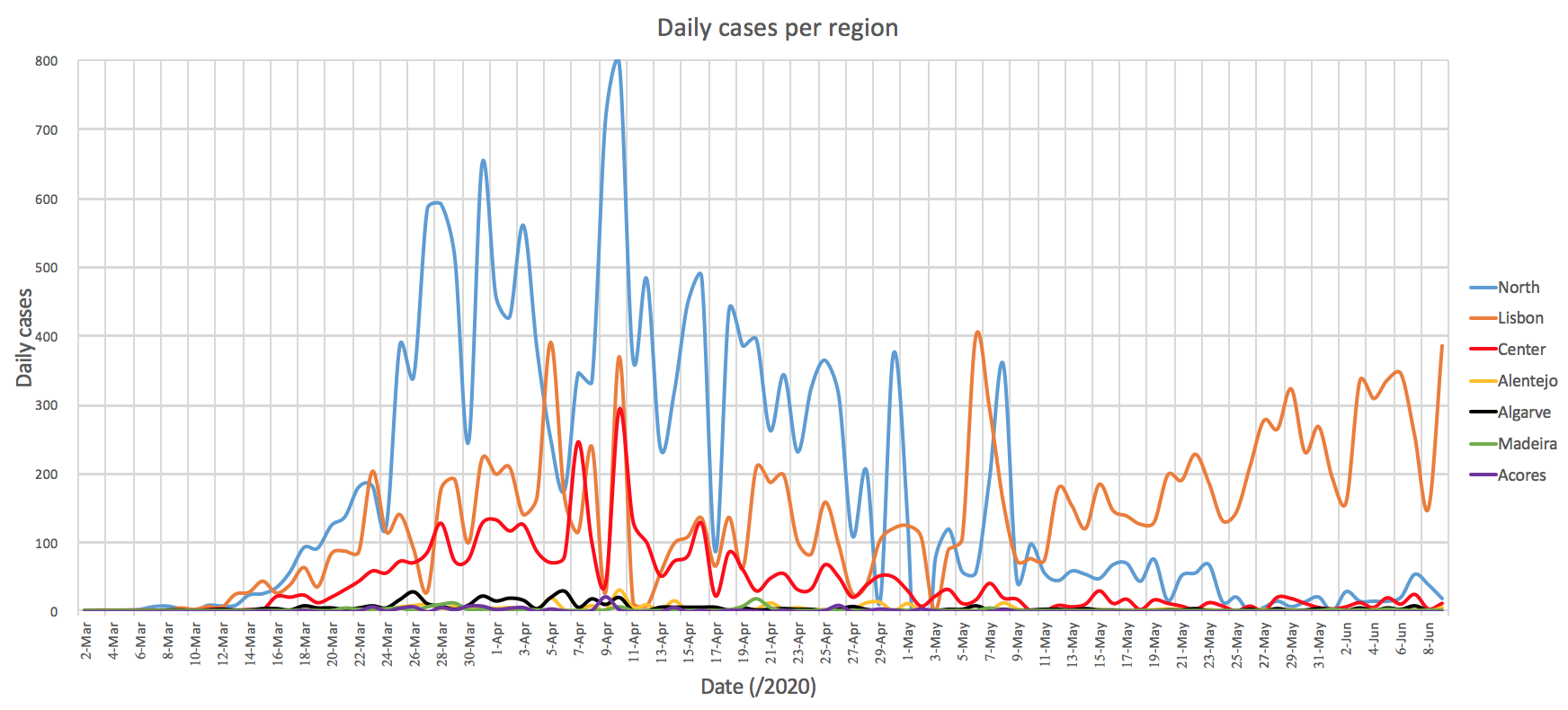
Daily cases of COVID-19 per region in Portugal. The lines are smoothed for better visualisation and are coloured according to each region of Portugal. The negative values are not shown here for better visualisation.

Similarly, the following graph presents the daily deaths by COVID-19 for each region of Portugal (updated on the 10th of June) according to DGS.

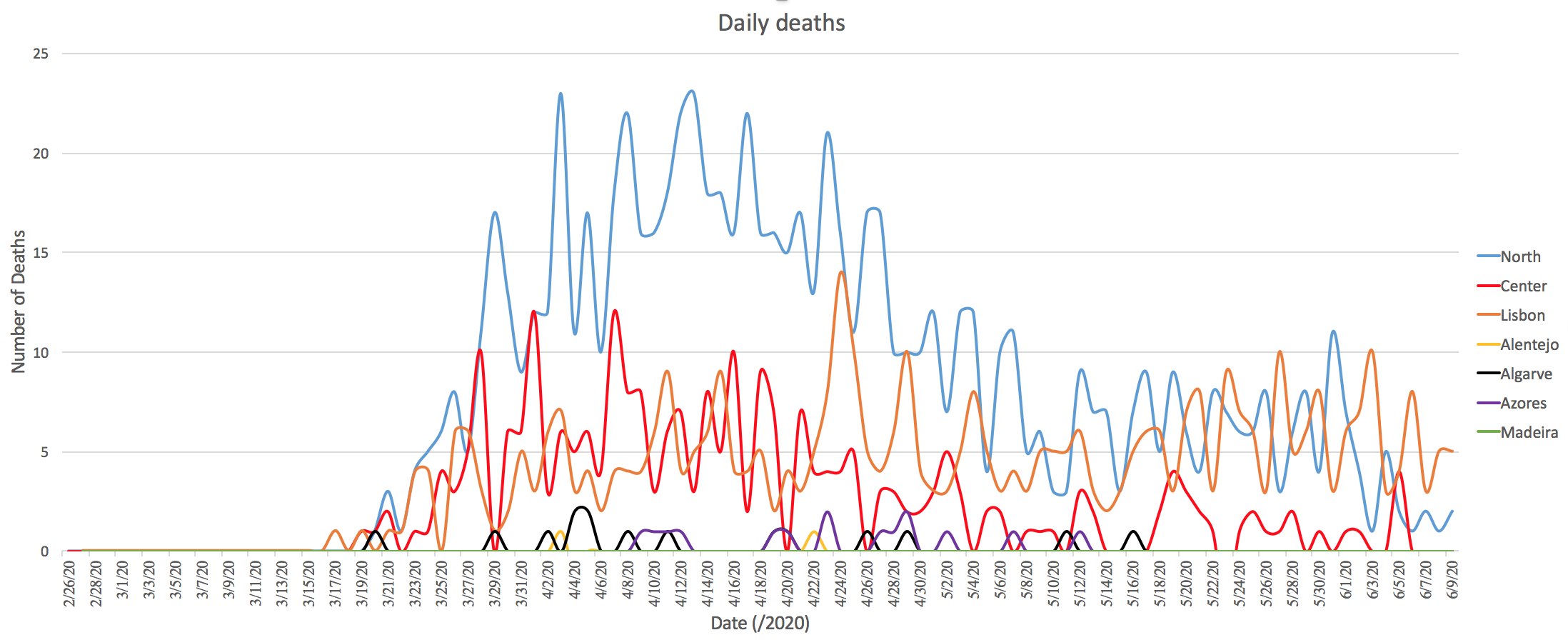
Daily deaths from COVID-19 per region in Portugal. The lines are smoothed for better visualisation and are coloured according to each region of Portugal. The negative values are not shown here for better visualisation.

=== Growth of cases by Municipalities ===
The following graph presents the total number of COVID-19 cases per day for the municipalities of Portugal with more than 1000 confirmed cases (updated on 30 May), according to the Data Science for Social Good Portugal.

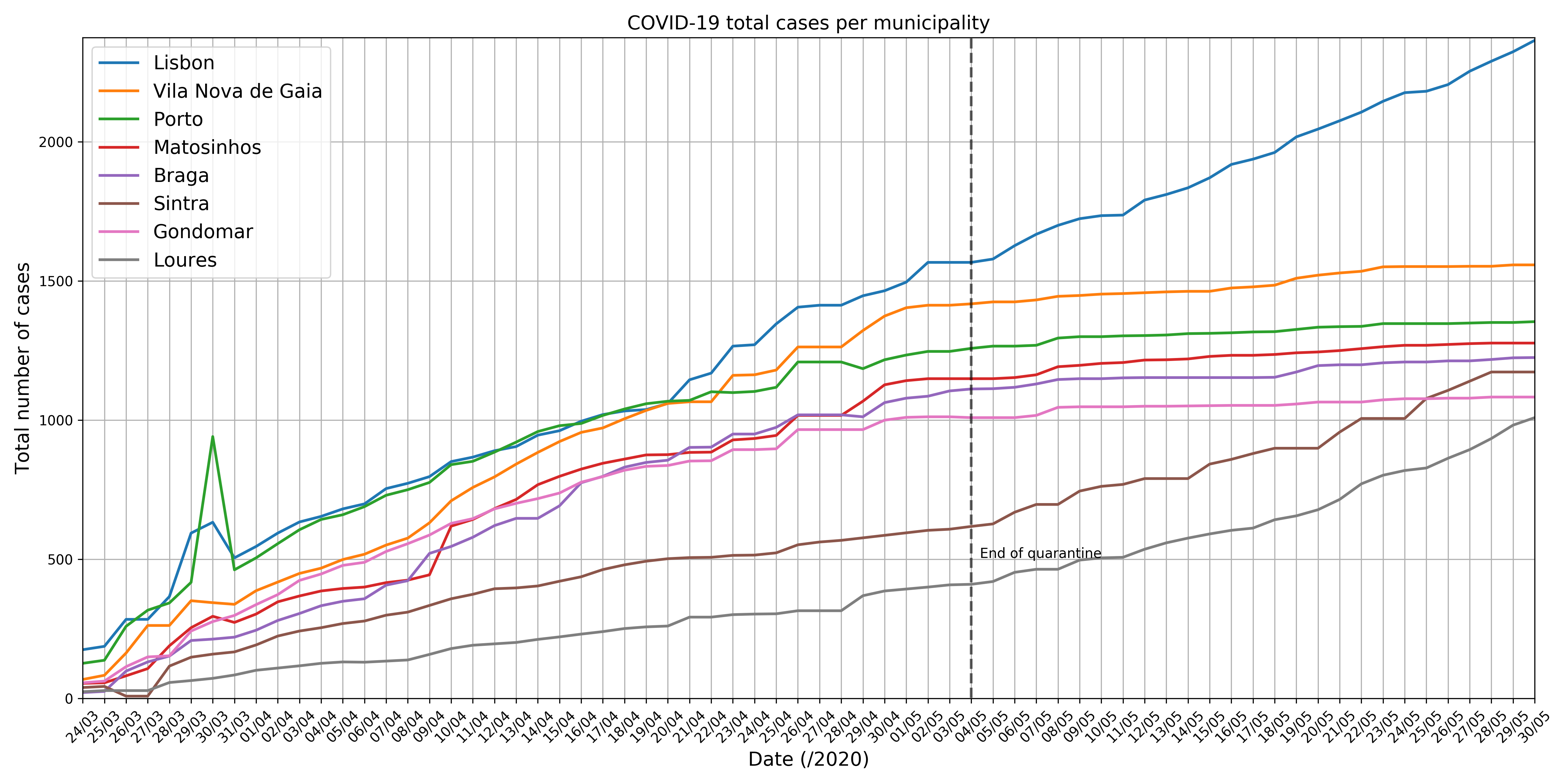
The total number of COVID-19 cases per municipality for those municipalities with more than 1000 confirmed cases. The legend shows which municipality corresponds to which coloured line in the graph and the vertical black line denotes the 4th of May 2020 as the end of the quarantine state.

=== 2009–20 deaths cases comparison ===
According to the Portuguese mortality surveillance (EVM), the following chart presents the total number of deaths per day in Portugal for the years 2009–2020 (updated on 10 June).

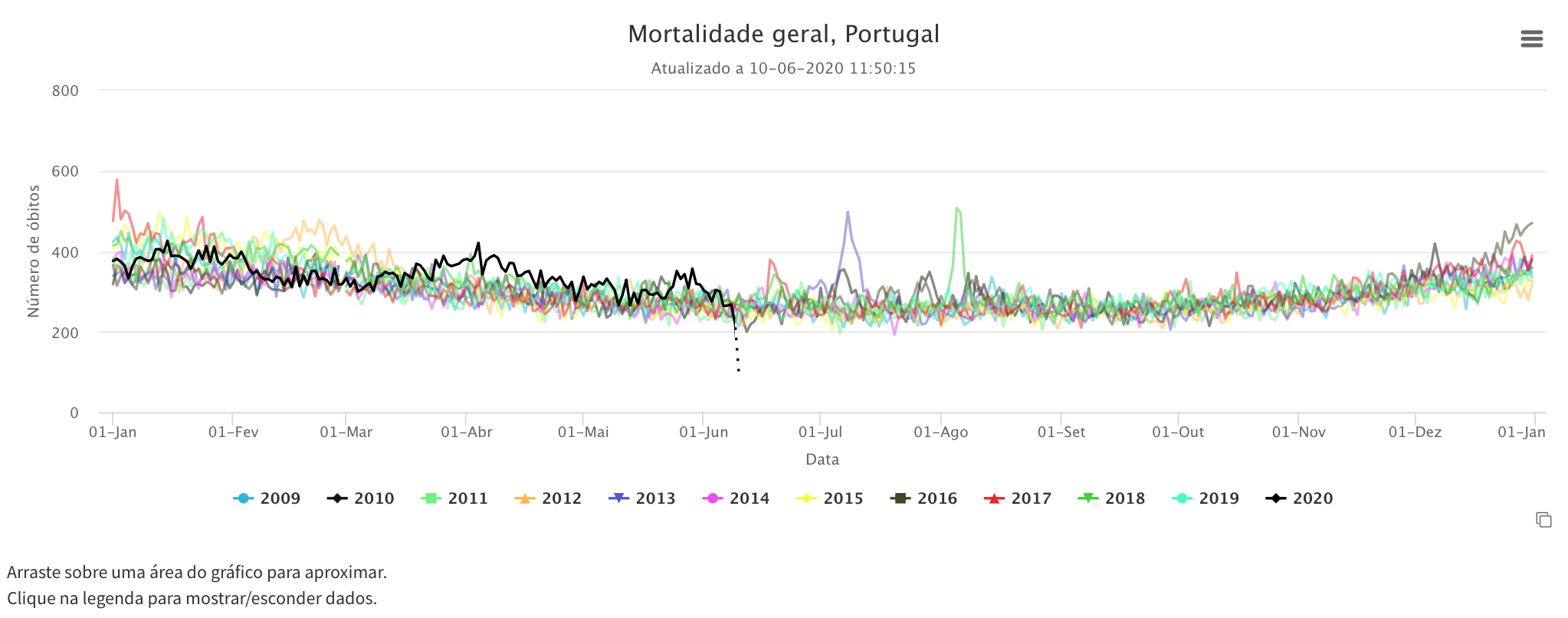
The total number of deaths per day in Portugal for various years including all ages.

In the following two graphs, the total deaths per day and by age group are presented for the years 2019 and 2020.

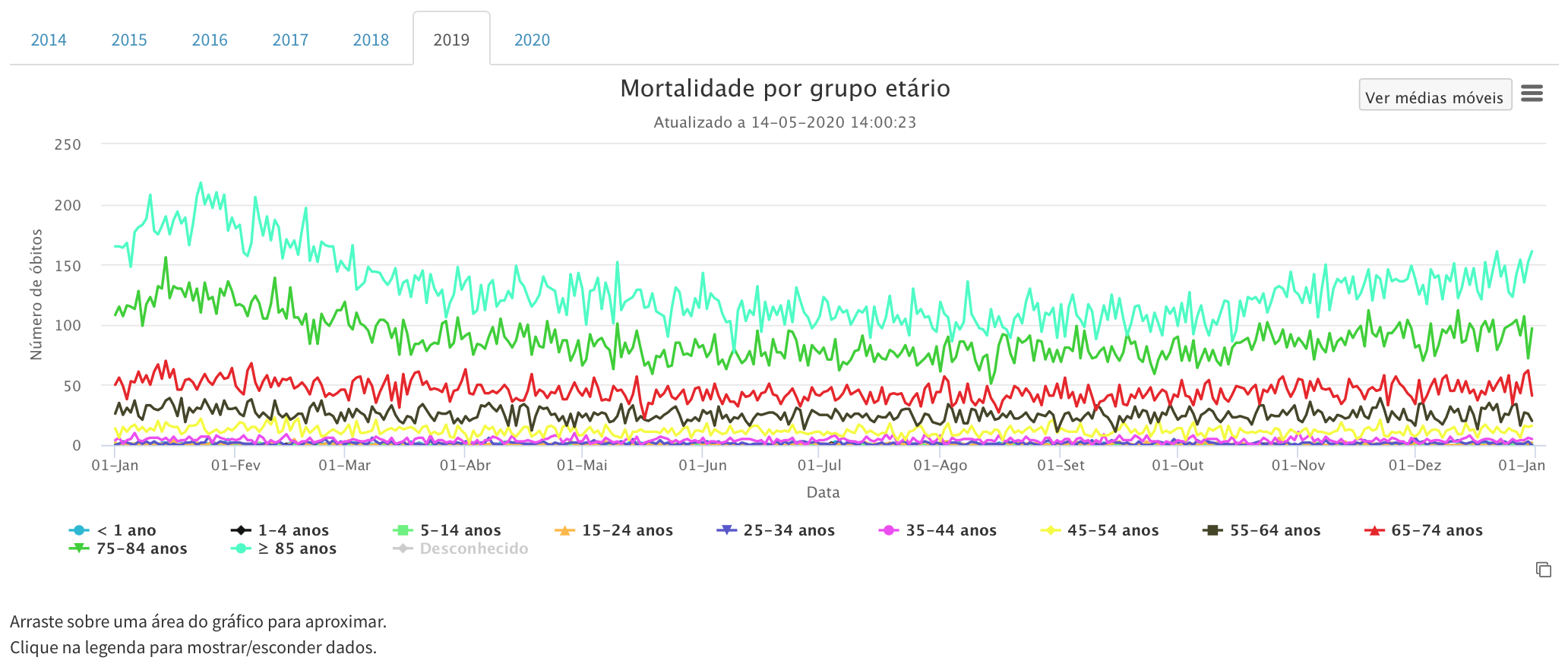
Total number of deaths per day for Portugal per age group for the year 2019.

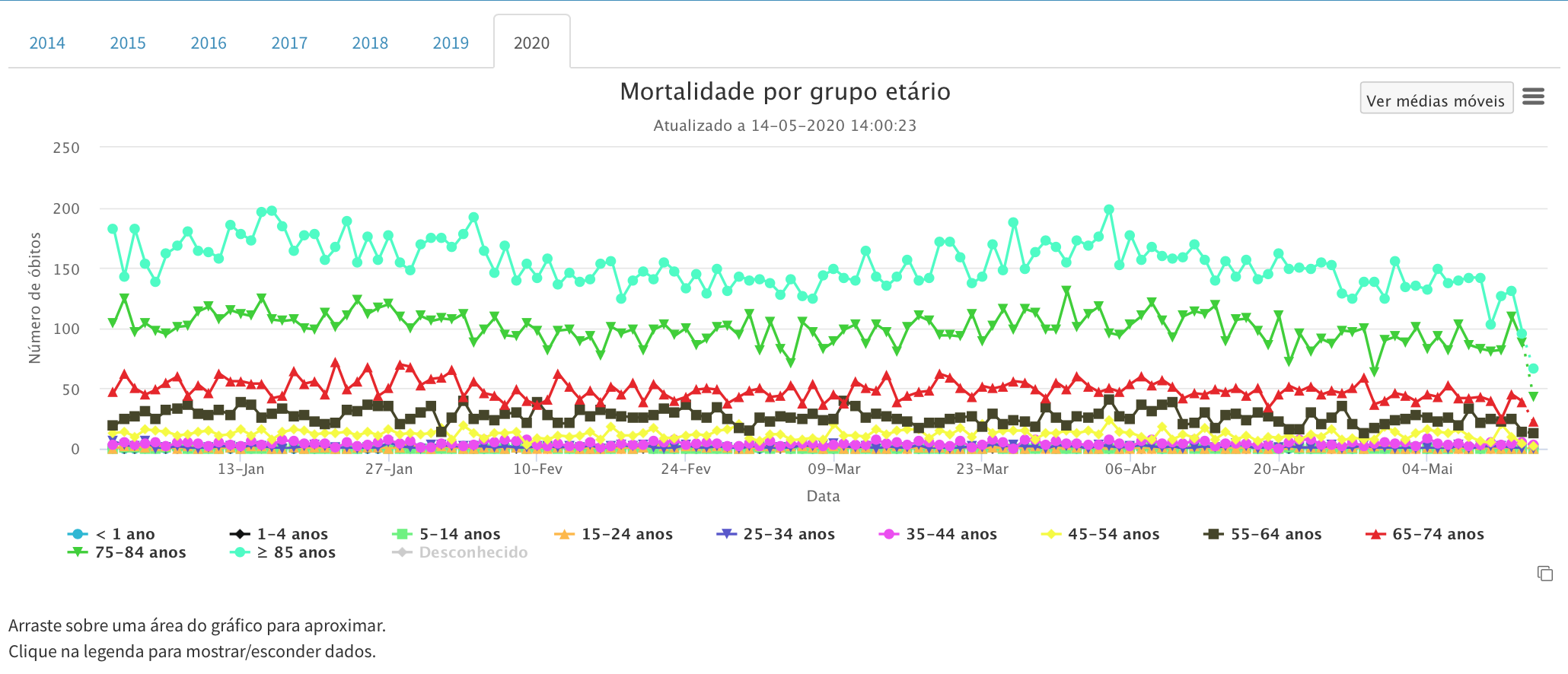
Total number of deaths per day for Portugal per age group for the year 2020.
