= Statistics of the COVID-19 pandemic in Germany =

== Statistics ==
=== Progression charts ===
==== Total confirmed cases, active cases, deaths, and recoveries ====
On 8 April 2020, the Robert Koch Institute began using another method to estimate the numbers of recoveries, now also incorporating cases where the date of the first symptoms is unknown. This caused the singular sharp drop in active cases on that date.

==== New cases per day ====
View source data.

==== New deaths per day ====
View source data.

==== Reproduction rate ====
The effective reproduction number or reproduction rate, symbolised with R_{e}, is a rate of how many more people are infected from a positive COVID-19 case. In order to suppress an outbreak, the reproduction rate must be constantly below 1, which means each positive case infects less than one person.

The Robert Koch Institute measures the reproduction rate as a moving 4-day average of the number of new symptomatic cases using a nowcasting according to the 4-day average number of new cases on a specific day and comparing it with the corresponding mean 4 days before, reflecting the spread of the disease roughly one to two weeks before any specific day. As it is however prone to larger fluctuation, taking into account possible delays in reporting, a 7-day rate is then introduced, which compares the 7-day average of cases at one specific date with 4 days before. Specific values have been published since its daily report on 7 April, while the R-rate has been calculated from 6 March.

Effective reproduction number. Logarithmic scaling highlights the important changes near 1. Above 1, the number of active infections will grow exponentially, but even below 1 the decline will be very slow, if R_{e} is too close to 1.

==== Number of tests per week ====
Since the beginning of testing in Germany up to and including week 25/2021 (Jun 21–27), 64,551,021 laboratory tests in at least 212 laboratories have been recorded, 4,245,186 of which have been positive. The number of tests is not the same as the number of persons tested, as the data may include multiple tests of patients.

==== Vaccinations ====
Vaccination numbers were obtained from the RKI and updated every business day. Starting from April, vaccinations can also be administered at a doctor's office alongside the existing vaccination center and mobile teams.

==== All-cause deaths ====
Weekly all-cause deaths in Germany based on mortality.org data.

Comparison of 2020 weekly mortality to the average of the 4 preceding years (data at mortality.org is available as of 2016 for Germany).

=== By age and gender ===
Number of COVID-19 cases per 100,000 people per week by age group (as of 13 May 2022)

}

Confirmed COVID-19 cases in Germany by age and gender
Classification		Cases		
Classification		Male	Female	Total
Age	80+	84,562	169,251	253,813
Age	60-79	196,900	199,764	396,664
Age	35-59	465,427	516,146	981,573
Age	15-34	369,142	374,574	743,716
Age	5-14	77,426	70,853	148,279
Age	0–4	26,136	24,295	50,431
Age	Unknown			19,838
All		1,219,593	1,354,883	2,594,764
Source: Robert Koch Institute; as of 2021/03/17, 00:00

COVID-19 deaths in Germany by age and gender
Classification		Deaths		
Classification		Male	Female	Total
Age	90+	5,698	11,201	16,899
Age	80-89	17,228	16,923	34,151
Age	70-79	9,120	5,094	14,214
Age	60-69	3,960	1,719	5,679
Age	50-59	1,353	558	1,911
Age	40-49	268	130	398
Age	30-39	84	49	133
Age	20-29	30	20	50
Age	10-19	3	0	3
Age	0–9	2	5	7
All		37,746	35,699	73,445
Source: Robert Koch Institute; as of 2021/03/17, 00:00

=== Data discussion ===
==== Testing ====
Until late March, due to the restrictive Robert Koch Institute (RKI) testing criteria, Germans without specific symptoms could not be tested. On 25 March 2020, the RKI announced that people no longer needed to come from risk areas to be tested. In the revised criteria, acute respiratory symptoms were generally maintained, with one additional criterion of the following having to be fulfilled: contact to a confirmed positive case in the last 14 days; work in health care; membership in a risk group; and in case of serious illness, no differential diagnosis. RKI president Wieler said that tests should be conducted in a "targeted and strategically sensible" manner, in order to avoid overstraining testing capacities. Mildly ill patients would not always be able to get tested, in which case they would be asked to remain at home and minimise contact with others. Wieler announced that the taking of representative samples in order to assess the number of infected more reliably would commence soon. Calls for conducting such studies were raised concurrently.

==== Reporting lag ====
Incubation period, and turn around time of the only diagnostic test (PCR) can lead to a reporting lag of five to ten days.

Because of the federal health care system in Germany, states vary in data collection, aggregation and time of release to the public. Local (Landkreise / Kreisfreie Städte) health departments initially reported data to the state health department which transferred data to the nations federal health department, many but not all on the day of receiving them. Reporting switched from manual to electronic. The Robert Koch Institute releases official numbers with an additional delay of several days. Cases reported by state health departments are added earlier to a project by Funke Mediengruppe, to which Berliner Morgenpost belongs. Johns Hopkins University seems to use the numbers of the Funke project for Germany indirectly while the Funke project uses numbers of Johns Hopkins University for other countries.

As of 25 March, the number of unknown cases was thought to be up to tenfold higher. Statistician Katharina Schüller advocated for representative sampling to gauge the real number of infected people, an initiative supported by the president of German Medical Association and scientists of Kiel Institute for the World Economy.

==== Number of deaths ====
As of March 2020, the reported death rate calculated as the number of deaths divided by the number of infected in Germany was lower than in some other areas such as Italy, for example. This has led foreign media to applaud or question it, while virologists, among others the leader of the RKI, warned that the country was simply at an earlier stage of the outbreak and fatalities would soon increase. Possible explanations have included:

- Germany tested more extensively, which decreased the uncertainty about the proportion of asymptomatic infected and brought the calculated mortality rate closer to the actual (lower) mortality rate. The extensive testing found younger and less sick people more often: their median age was given as 47 or 45 years, whereas Italy tested older and sicker people at a median of 63 years. Many early infections happened in skiers returning from Tyrol, who tended to be fit people rather than persons at higher risk of complications, and contributed a negligible mortality.
- Since Germany has no routine for post-mortem tests, unlike Italy it may not have discovered all deaths. In Spain, the first death was also discovered by a test carried out post-mortem.
- The elderly in Germany often do not live in the same household as their extended family and this has reduced the number of infections.
- Germany has many test laboratories and a weekly test capacity of 160 thousand and could have a lower number of unrecorded cases of infections than for example Italy, though the number of tests including negative results was unknown until 23 March.
- Italy has several times fewer hospital beds for intensive respiratory care than Germany. While Italy and Spain ran out of beds, German hospitals still had free capacity. The number of beds, protective gear and the number of medical personnel can become bottlenecks for providing adequate care. However, as of the end of March, it was "too early to say whether Germany is better medically prepared for the COVID-19 pandemic than other countries".
- Daily reported death tolls increased in the first half of April; the Robert-Koch-Institut attributed this to the fact that there was a growing number of outbreaks in care homes, whose elderly populations were particularly vulnerable.

==== Criticism ====
On 7 May 2020, Stephan Kohn, Oberregierungsrat ("senior government official") in the Federal Ministry of the Interior, Building and Community, published a document based on a large number of statistical surveys in which he harshly criticised the government's assessment of and reaction to the COVID-19 pandemic. As a member of the Ministry's Division KM 4 Critical Infrastructure Protection, Kohn devised the document with the help of external professors (Harald Walach, Gunnar Heinsohn, Stefan Hockertz, Andreas Sönnichsen, Sucharit Bhakdi, Karina Reiß, Peter Schirmacher). Kohn accused his own government of being one of the largest distributors of "fake news" concerning the COVID-19 pandemic. After the publication Kohn was disavowed by Angela Merkel and Horst Seehofer, who said that he was neither ordered nor authorized to do so, and by his own party, the Social Democratic Party of Germany. He was suspended and his laptop confiscated. He is accused of giving away internal information and disciplinary proceedings have been initiated. The counseling professors and physicians issued a statement in which they back Stephan Kohn.

== See also ==
- COVID-19 pandemic in Germany
- German government response to the COVID-19 pandemic
