= Statistics of the COVID-19 pandemic in Thailand =

This article presents statistics covering the COVID-19 pandemic in Thailand.

== Maps ==
Map of provinces with confirmed or suspected coronavirus cases :
Confirmed deaths reported
Confirmed cases reported
No active cases (all cases had an outcome)

Number of confirmed cases by province :
Confirmed 100–499
Confirmed 500–999
Confirmed 1,000+
