= Statistics of the COVID-19 pandemic in Pakistan =

Below are detailed tables and graphs that show the historical spread and trends of COVID-19 in Pakistan. Data (for both the national and provincial levels) from 26 February 2020 (the day the first confirmed cases were recorded) to 9 March 2020 was taken by compiling news reports about the pandemic in Pakistan that minutely covered the pandemic. From 10 March 2020 – 2 April 2020, data was taken from the NIH's daily reports on COVID-19 that were published from 11 March to 3 April (these reports were published early in the day and thus reflected the previous day's cases). Since 3 April 2020, data has been taken from the federal government's live tracker. A more detailed list of sources and data covering the national and provincial levels can be found here. Sources regarding the district level can be found in their subsection.

== National ==
=== Daily new confirmed cases ===
View source data.

=== Daily new deaths ===
View source data.

=== Case statistics ===
The three line graphs below give a detailed overview of the current and historical case, recovery, and death counts throughout the Pakistan. The first two show the exponential growth of the pandemic in the country by using a linear scale for their Y-Axes. The third plot uses a Logarithmic scale for its Y-Axis to show relationships between the trends. On a Logarithmic Scale, data that shows exponential growth will plot as a straight line. Each major division is a factor of ten. This makes the slope of the plot the relative rate of change anywhere in the timeline, which allows comparison of one plot with the others throughout the pandemic.

Cumulative confirmed cases Active cases Cumulative recoveries Cumulative deaths

View source data.

Daily New Confirmed Cases Daily New Recoveries Daily New Deaths

View source data.
View source data.
View source data.
View source data.
Cumulative Confirmed Cases
Cumulative Recoveries
Cumulative Deaths
Daily New Confirmed Cases
Daily New Recoveries
Daily New Deaths
Active Cases

=== Fatality rates ===
The chart below displays the Case Fatality Rate (CFR) of COVID-19 within Pakistan. The two different trendlines represent different methods of measuring CFR during a pandemic. The first line shows the CFR when calculated using the most common method (Dividing the total number of deaths by the number of confirmed cases) and the second line shows the CFR when deaths are divided by the number of closed cases (the number you get when you add the number of recoveries and the number of deaths). By the end of the pandemic, barring any major demographic shifts, the Case Fatality Rate should end up somewhere between the two values (as they stand currently).
The latest data on the graph below pertains to 22 May 2021

View source data.
View source data.
Case Fatality Rate: Deaths ÷ Confirmed Cases
Fatality Rate: Deaths ÷ Closed Cases (Recoveries + Deaths)

=== Testing statistics ===
The two charts below display historical COVID-19 testing data since 3 April 2020, when reliable testing data became available in Pakistan. The first chart covers raw data of numbers of cumulative tests, new tests, and cumulative confirmed cases and new confirmed case counts for comparison with testing numbers. It can be viewed on a linear or logarithmic scale. The second chart shows different types of test positivity rates in Pakistan since the same date. In the second chart, the total positivity rate (Cumulative Confirmed Cases ÷ Cumulative Tests Performed), the daily positivity rate (Daily New Confirmed Cases ÷ Daily New Performed Tests), and a Seven-Day Positivity Rates (Confirmed Cases over the last seven days ÷ Performed Tests over the last seven days) are all compared.
The latest data on the graph below pertains to 22 May 2021

View source data.
View source data.
View source data.
Cumulative Tests Performed
Cumulative Confirmed Cases
Daily New Performed Tests
Daily New Performed Tests (seven-day moving average)
Daily New Confirmed Cases

=== Positivity rates ===
The latest data on the graph below pertains to 22 May 2021

View source data.
Total Positivity Rate (Cumulative Confirmed Cases ÷ Cumulative Performed Tests)
Daily Positivity Rate (Daily New Confirmed Cases ÷ Daily New Performed Tests)
Seven-Day Positivity Rate (Confirmed Cases over the last seven days ÷ Performed Tests over the last seven days)

== Regional ==
The chart below shows the total number of cumulative confirmed cases in each one of Pakistan's seven administrative units. It can be viewed on either a linear scale, or a logarithmic scale, to better differentiate between each administrative unit and their trajectory.
The latest data on both the graph and the chart below pertains to 22 May 2020

View source data.
View source data.
Punjab
Sindh
Khyber Pakhtunkhwa
Balochistan
Islamabad Capital Territory
Azad Jammu & Kashmir
Gilgit-Baltistan
View source data.

== District-wise ==
The data in this section has been taken from many different sources and is released for many provinces on an irregular basis. The data for the districts of Punjab can be found on an official Twitter page run by the provincial government where data is released daily. The data for Sindh's districts can be found on the website of Sindh's health department, where a "Daily Situation Report" is typically released daily. The most recent data for the districts of Khyber Pakhtunkhwa and the Districts of Balochistan, Pakistan is usually available on the website of National Humanitarian Network Pakistan, which is a collection of NGOs. Data for these two provinces is released sporadically. The districts of Azad Jammu & Kashmir all have data released on a live dashboard, similar to the federal government's, which is usually updated daily. Data for Gilgit-Baltistan's districts is currently not available.

The latest data on the two tables below pertains to:

14 May 2021 – Punjab and Islamabad Capital Territory

12 May 2021 – Azad Jammu & Kashmir

7 May 2021 – Sindh and Khyber Pakhtunkhwa

6 May 2021 – Balochistan

District-wise distribution of confirmed cases as of latest data (top 20 districts)
| Districts | Number of confirmed cases | Population of District (2017) |
|---|---|---|
| Karachi, Sindh (combined districts) | 189,002 | 16,051,521 |
| Lahore District | 169,713 | 11,126,285 |
| Islamabad Capital Territory | 79,027 | 2,006,572 |
| Peshawar District | 46,899 | 4,269,079 |
| Rawalpindi District | 24,605 | 5,405,633 |
| Faisalabad District | 20,133 | 7,873,910 |
| Hyderabad District | 16,730 | 2,199,463 |
| Multan District | 16,285 | 4,745,109 |
| Quetta District | 16,022 | 2,275,699 |
| Gujranwala District | 7,871 | 5,014,196 |
| Sargodha District | 7,727 | 3,703,588 |
| Swat District | 7,548 | 2,309,570 |
| Mardan District | 7,470 | 2,373,061 |
| Bahawalpur District | 7,367 | 3,668,106 |
| Gujrat District | 6,839 | 2,756,110 |
| Sialkot District | 6,808 | 3,893,672 |
| Sukkur District | 5,372 | 1,487,903 |
| Rahim Yar Khan District | 5,242 | 4,814,006 |
| Ghotki District | 5,233 | 1,646,318 |
| Nowshera District | 5,155 | 1,518,540 |

District-wise distribution of confirmed cases as of latest data (20 most populous districts)
| Districts | Number of confirmed cases | Population of District (2017) |
|---|---|---|
| Karachi, Sindh (combined districts) | 189,002 | 16,051,521 |
| Lahore District, Punjab | 169,713 | 11,126,285 |
| Faisalabad District, Punjab | 20,133 | 7,873,910 |
| Rawalpindi District, Punjab | 24,605 | 5,405,633 |
| Gujranwala District, Punjab | 7,871 | 5,014,196 |
| Rahim Yar Khan District, Punjab | 5,242 | 4,814,006 |
| Multan District, Punjab | 16,285 | 4,745,105 |
| Muzaffargarh District, Punjab | 1,981 | 4,322,009 |
| Peshawar District, KPK | 46,899 | 4,269,079 |
| Sialkot District, Punjab | 6,808 | 3,892,672 |
| Sargodha District, Punjab | 7,727 | 3,703,588 |
| Bahawalpur District, Punjab | 7,367 | 3,668,106 |
| Sheikhupura District, Punjab | 3,486 | 3,460,426 |
| Kasur District, Punjab | 2,237 | 3,454,996 |
| Okara District, Punjab | 1,883 | 3,039,139 |
| Bahawalnagar District, Punjab | 1,780 | 2,981,919 |
| Khanewal District, Punjab | 1,852 | 2,921,986 |
| Vehari District, Punjab | 2,376 | 2,897,446 |
| Dera Ghazi Khan District, Punjab | 3,174 | 2,872,201 |
| Gujrat District, Punjab | 6,839 | 2,756,110 |
