= Statistics of the COVID-19 pandemic in Serbia =

Statistics relating to COVID-19 in Serbia

This article consists of various statistical charts related to the COVID-19 pandemic in Serbia.

== Cases ==
=== Total confirmed cases ===
View source data.

=== New cases per day ===
View source data.

=== Growth factor ===
View source data.

Growth factor is defined as today's new cases/new cases on the previous day. It is indicative of the evolution of the pandemic. A continuously decreasing factor indicates that the pandemic is under control.

=== Cases by age group ===
View source data.

== Hospitalized ==
From June 6 until July 15, official source stopped giving number of hospitalized patients, only number of active ones From 6 June to 15 July this chart shows number of active cases.

View source data.

=== Number of people on ventilators ===
View source data.

== Recoveries ==
Sudden jump in number of recoveries since 6 June was explained by changed methodology of determining healthy patients, requiring only one negative COVID-19 PCR test, as opposed to two negative test at least 24 hours apart required before.

== Deaths ==
=== Total number of deaths ===
View source data.

=== Number of deaths per day ===
View source data.

=== Deaths by age groups ===
View source data.

=== Average age of deceased on the day ===
View source data.

== By regions ==
=== Number of infected by districts and towns ===
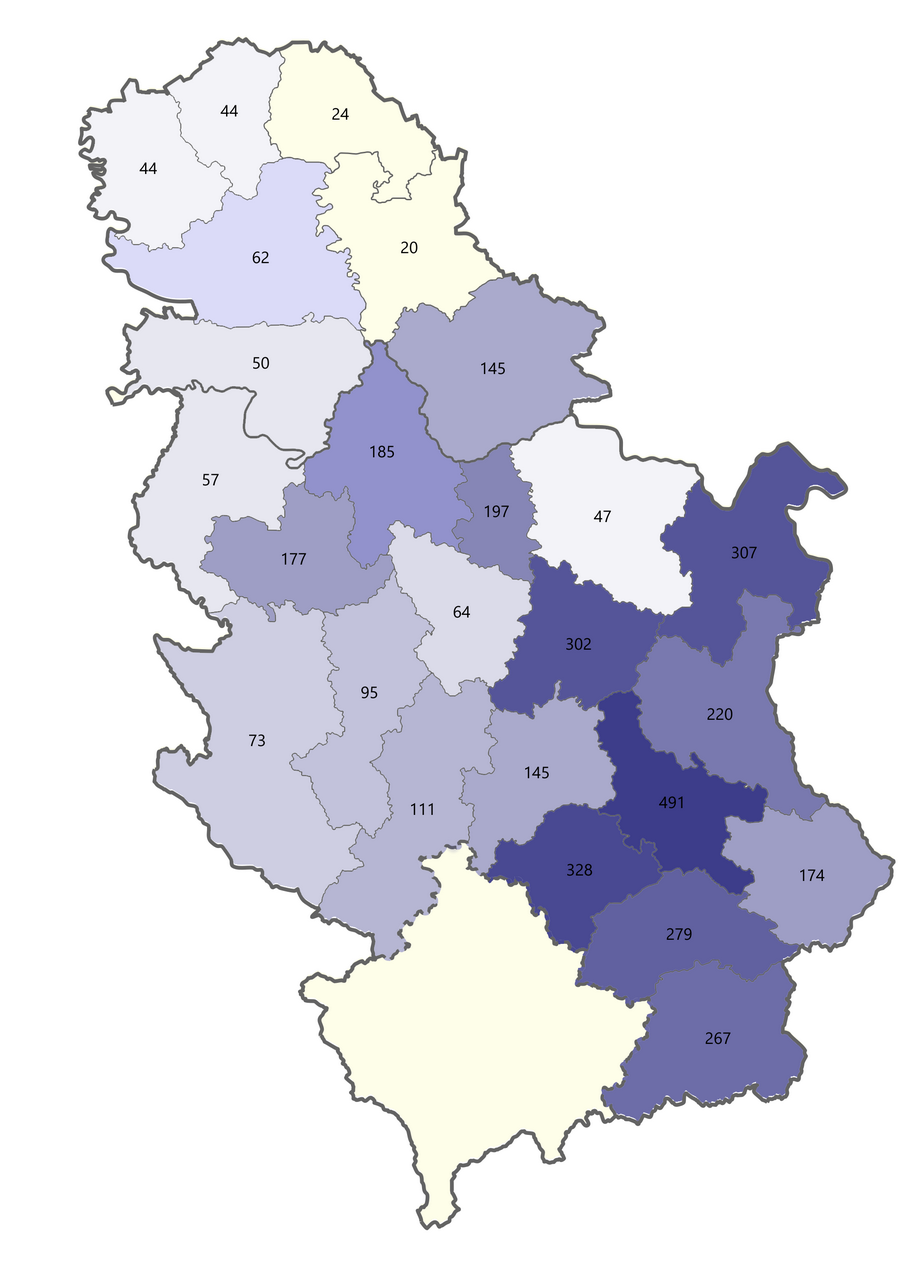
COVID-19 infected inhabitants per 100,000 people in Districts of Serbia without Kosovo* (2 June 2020)

Number of cases and deaths in Republic of Serbia, divided by districts and municipalities.
District	Town	Cases
West Bačka District	Apatin	8
West Bačka District	Kula	29
West Bačka District	Odžaci	4
West Bačka District	Sombor	42
Total		83
North Bačka District	Bačka Topola	30
North Bačka District	Subotica	53
Total		83
North Banat District	Ada	1
North Banat District	Čoka	1
North Banat District	Kanjiža	1
North Banat District	Kikinda	30
North Banat District	Novi Kneževac	1
North Banat District	Senta	2
Total		36
South Bačka District	Bač	4
South Bačka District	Bačka Palanka	29
South Bačka District	Bački Petrovac	2
South Bačka District	Beočin	10
South Bačka District	Bečej	8
South Bačka District	Novi Sad	242
South Bačka District	Srbobran	20
South Bačka District	Sremski Karlovci	3
South Bačka District	Temerin	14
South Bačka District	Titel	12
South Bačka District	Vrbas	22
South Bačka District	Žabalj	15
Total		381
Central Banat District	Nova Crnja	4
Central Banat District	Novi Bečej	5
Central Banat District	Sečanj	3
Central Banat District	Zrenjanin	26
Total		38
Srem District	Sremska Mitrovica	1063
Srem District	Inđija	552
Srem District	Irig	123
Srem District	Pećinci	391
Srem District	Stara Pazova	747
Srem District	Šid	285
Srem District	Ruma	998
Total		4159
South Banat District	Alibunar	27
South Banat District	Bela Crkva	47
South Banat District	Kovačica	23
South Banat District	Kovin	30
South Banat District	Plandište	11
South Banat District	Opovo	14
South Banat District	Pančevo	177
South Banat District	Vršac	92
Total		421
City of Belgrade		3114
Total		3114
Mačva District	Bogatić	3
Mačva District	Koceljeva	4
Mačva District	Krupanj	7
Mačva District	Loznica	46
Mačva District	Ljubovija	3
Mačva District	Mali Zvornik	3
Mačva District	Šabac	94
Mačva District	Vladimirci	11
Total		171
Kolubara District	Lajkovac	31
Kolubara District	Ljig	13
Kolubara District	Mionica	33
Kolubara District	Osečina	9
Kolubara District	Ub	24
Kolubara District	Valjevo	198
Total		308
Šumadija District	Aranđelovac	23
Šumadija District	Batočina	8
Šumadija District	Kragujevac	133
Šumadija District	Knić	1
Šumadija District	Lapovo	3
Šumadija District	Rača	12
Šumadija District	Topola	9
Total		189
Podunavlje District	Smederevo	243
Podunavlje District	Smederevska Palanka	100
Podunavlje District	Velika Plana	50
Total		393
Braničevo District	Golubac	2
Braničevo District	Malo Crniće	2
Braničevo District	Petrovac na Mlavi	6
Braničevo District	Požarevac	58
Braničevo District	Kučevo	1
Braničevo District	Veliko Gradište	9
Braničevo District	Žabari	6
Braničevo District	Žagubica	2
Total		86
Zlatibor District	Bajina Bašta	34
Zlatibor District	Nova Varoš	15
Zlatibor District	Požega	31
Zlatibor District	Prijepolje	10
Zlatibor District	Sjenica	10
Zlatibor District	Priboj	24
Zlatibor District	Arilje	22
Zlatibor District	Čajetina	10
Zlatibor District	Užice	52
Total		208
Moravica District	Čačak	125
Moravica District	Gornji Milanovac	57
Moravica District	Ivanjica	7
Moravica District	Lučani	15
Total		204
Pomoravlje District	Ćuprija	259
Pomoravlje District	Despotovac	35
Pomoravlje District	Paraćin	158
Pomoravlje District	Rekovac	21
Pomoravlje District	Svilajnac	35
Pomoravlje District	Jagodina	140
Total		648
Rasina District	Aleksandrovac	48
Rasina District	Brus	13
Rasina District	Ćićevac	8
Rasina District	Kruševac	240
Rasina District	Trstenik	13
Rasina District	Varvarin	26
Total		348
Bor District	Bor	173
Bor District	Kladovo	37
Bor District	Majdanpek	13
Bor District	Negotin	57
Total		380
Raška District	Kraljevo	109
Raška District	Novi Pazar	112
Raška District	Raška	68
Raška District	Tutin	30
Raška District	Vrnjačka Banja	24
Total		343
Nišava District	Aleksinac	222
Nišava District	Doljevac	88
Nišava District	Gadžin Han	20
Nišava District	Merošina	70
Nišava District	Niš	1377
Nišava District	Ražanj	21
Nišava District	Svrljig	32
Total		1830
Zaječar District	Boljevac	40
Zaječar District	Knjaževac	33
Zaječar District	Sokobanja	67
Zaječar District	Zaječar	124
Total		264
Toplica District	Blace	48
Toplica District	Kuršumlija	62
Toplica District	Prokuplje	148
Toplica District	Žitorađa	43
Total		301
Jablanica District	Bojnik	31
Jablanica District	Crna Trava	1
Jablanica District	Lebane	38
Jablanica District	Leskovac	519
Jablanica District	Medveđa	4
Jablanica District	Vlasotince	120
Total		713
Pirot District	Babušnica	26
Pirot District	Bela Palanka	23
Pirot District	Dimitrovgrad	3
Pirot District	Pirot	109
Total		161
Pčinja District	Bosilegrad	4
Pčinja District	Bujanovac	16
Pčinja District	Preševo	6
Pčinja District	Surdulica	60
Pčinja District	Trgovište	5
Pčinja District	Vladičin Han	26
Pčinja District	Vranje	307
Total		424
District of Mitrovica	Leposavić	28
District of Mitrovica	North Mitrovica	26
District of Mitrovica	Zubin Potok	25
District of Mitrovica	Zvečan	23
Total (*)		102
District of Gjilan	Gjilan	9
District of Gjilan	Kamenica	4
District of Gjilan	Vitina	1
Total (*)		14
District of Pristina	Glogovac	2
District of Pristina	Kosovo Polje	5
District of Pristina	Lipljan	6
District of Pristina	Obilić	1
District of Pristina	Podujevo	2
District of Pristina	Pristina	11
Total (*)		27
District of Peć	Istok	3
District of Peć	Klina	4
District of Peć	Peć	6
Total (*)		13
District of Prizren	Prizren	7
Total (*)		7
District of Gjakova	Gjakova	2
Total (*)		2
District of Ferizaj	Štimlje	3
District of Ferizaj	Štrpce	1
District of Ferizaj	Ferizaj	2
Total (*)		7
Grand total		11455
2 Jun 2020.

_{(*) – include only Serbian communities in Kosovo}

View source data.
Number of confirmed cases on a logarithmic scale

View source data.

=== Number of self-isolated people by municipalities and towns ===
View source data.

View source data.

Data acquired from the official website.
