= Statistics of the COVID-19 pandemic in Singapore =

Various statistics relating to COVID-19 cases and deaths in Singapore

This article presents official statistics gathered during the COVID-19 pandemic in Singapore.

Number of cases (blue) and number of deaths (red) on a logarithmic scale.

The Ministry of Health of Singapore has been publishing official numbers on a daily basis since the first confirmed case of SARS-CoV-2 virus on 23 January 2020. In their situation reports, the cases are broken down into several categories: imported cases, non-imported community cases, non-imported dormitory cases. Prior to 16 April 2020, MOH had released the data only at the end of the day. However upon discovery of a civil servant leaking information before the official release of data, since 17 April 2020, MOH has been providing a preliminary update of summarised figures at around noon of each day with the details released at the end of the day.

== Classifying COVID-19 cases ==
Singapore adheres strictly to World Health Organization's case definition for classifying COVID-19 deaths, which does not include non-pneumonia fatalities like those caused by blood or heart issues among COVID-19 patients in its official tally. This was exemplified in three cases which the cause of death was recorded as either ischaemic heart disease or heart attack, and a suicide committed by an Indian migrant worker who was tested positive for the virus.

== Charts ==
The linear plot shows the total number of cases as a function of time (by date) since 23 January 2020, the date of the first reported case in Singapore, while the graph plotted on a logarithmic scale, or a semi-log plot, shows an exponential growth in the number of cases as a straight line on the graph. In the logarithmic scale plot, the slope of the straight line determines the rate of growth of the number of cases, with a steeper slope representing a higher growth rate. The third and fourth plot shows the number of daily new cases and total active cases respectively as reported.

=== Overview ===
View source data.

=== Cases per day ===
Cases per day

View source data.

=== Active cases per day ===
Active cases

View source data.

=== Recoveries per day ===
Recoveries per day

View source data.

=== Deaths per day ===
Deaths per day
View source data.

=== Total tests performed ===
The linear plot shows the total number of tests performed as a function of time (by date) from 7 April 2020, the date of the first testing data given in Singapore.
