= Statistics of the COVID-19 pandemic in Japan =

Statistics

== Statistics ==
=== Number of cases and deaths ===
Cases

Deaths

=== Cumulative ===
No. of total confirmed cases

View source data.

No. of total deaths

View source data.

No. of total cases by age groups

View source data.

=== Daily ===
No. of new cases per day

View source data.

No. of new deaths per day

View source data.

No. of total active cases per day

View source data.

=== Case fatality rate ===
The trend of case fatality rate for COVID-19 from 16 January, the day first case in the country was recorded.

Case fatality rate in Japan
