= Statistics of the COVID-19 pandemic in Chile =

Statistics relating to COVID-19 in Chile

This article consists of various statistical charts related to the ongoing COVID-19 pandemic in Chile.

== Daily report ==
The following table includes the data reported daily by the Ministry of Health, based on the information available at 21:00 the day before the report is released.

On 9 June 2020, the Ministry of Health announced a new process to count the number of fatalities, based on the data recorded by the Civil Registry and Identification Service the day before. That method was changed again on 17 July; from that day, the deaths were counted using the data from the Department of Statistics and Health Information (DEIS) of the Ministry of Health. Due to the process of detection of deaths, the daily reports included deaths from several days prior, creating a gap between the date of report and the official date of death.

A graphic with the active cases as shown on the official data page of the Ministry, which are based on retroactively adjusted information rather than on daily reports, is also displayed.

Day (Note: Data released by the Ministry of Health, based on the information available at 21:00 the day before the report is released.)	Cases		Recovered cases (Note: The Chilean Ministry of Health considered all cases as a "recovered" after 14 days since the initial symptoms of the virus, no matter the health situation of the infected or if following tests indicate the continuing presence of the virus. The only exception were casualties, which are not included as recovered. On 25 May 2020, Minister Jaime Mañalich confirmed that the number informed does not represent the number of clinically recovered people, but just an estimation of the number of non-contagious cases. Between 2 and 28 June, the government didn't release the number of recovered cases in their daily report.)	Active cases	Confirmed (PCR+) deaths (Note: Deaths according to the daily reports, not according to real date of death. It considers only the cases with a positive PCR test.)		incl. suspected deaths (Note: Includes all deaths recorded by the Department of Statistics and Health Information (DEIS) related to COVID-19, including cases without confirmed PCR test or without enough evidence to link the death exclusively to COVID-19)
Day	New	Total	Recovered cases	Active cases	New	Total	incl. suspected deaths
3 March 2020	1	1		1	0	0	
4 March 2020	2	3		3	0	0	
5 March 2020	1	4		4	0	0	
6 March 2020	1	5		5	0	0	
7 March 2020	2	7		7	0	0	
8 March 2020	3	10		10	0	0	
9 March 2020	5	15		15	0	0	
10 March 2020	2	17		17	0	0	
11 March 2020	6	23		23	0	0	
12 March 2020	10	33		33	0	0	
13 March 2020	10	43		43	0	0	
14 March 2020	18	61		61	0	0	
15 March 2020	14	75		75	0	0	
16 March 2020	81	156		156	0	0	
17 March 2020	45	201	1	200	0	0	
18 March 2020	37	238	3	235	0	0	
19 March 2020	104	342	5	337	0	0	
20 March 2020	92	434	6	428	0	0	
21 March 2020	103	537	8	528	1	1	
22 March 2020	95	632	8	623	0	1	
23 March 2020	114	746	11	733	1	2	
24 March 2020	176	922	17	903	0	2	
25 March 2020	220	1,142	22	1,117	1	3	
26 March 2020	164	1,306	33	1,269	1	4	
27 March 2020	304	1,610	43	1,562	1	5	
28 March 2020	299	1,909	61	1,842	1	6	
29 March 2020	230	2,139	75	2,057	1	7	
30 March 2020	310	2,449	156	2,285	1	8	
31 March 2020	289	2,738	201	2,525	4	12	
1 April 2020	293	3,031	234	2,781	4	16	
2 April 2020	373	3,404	335	3,051	2	18	
3 April 2020	333	3,737	427	3,288	4	22	
4 April 2020	424	4,161	528	3,606	5	27	
5 April 2020	310	4,471	598	3,839	7	34	
6 April 2020	344	4,815	728	4,050	3	37	
7 April 2020	301	5,116	898	4,175	6	43	
8 April 2020	430	5,546	1,115	4,383	5	48	
9 April 2020	426	5,972	1,274	4,641	9	57	
10 April 2020	529	6,501	1,571	4,865	8	65	
11 April 2020	426	6,927	1,864	4,990	8	73	
12 April 2020	286	7,213	2,059	5,074	7	80	
13 April 2020	312	7,525	2,367	5,076	2	82	
14 April 2020	392	7,917	2,646	5,179	10	92	
15 April 2020	356	8,273	2,937	5,242	2	94	
16 April 2020	534	8,807	3,299	5,403	11	105	
17 April 2020	445	9,252	3,621	5,515	11	116	
18 April 2020	478	9,730	4,035	5,569	10	126	
19 April 2020	358	10,088	4,338	5,617	7	133	
20 April 2020	419	10,507	4,676	5,692	6	139	
21 April 2020	325	10,832	4,969	5,716	8	147	
22 April 2020	464	11,296	5,386	5,750	13	160	
23 April 2020	516	11,812	5,804	5,840	8	168	
24 April 2020	494	12,306	6,327	5,805	6	174	
25 April 2020	552	12,858	6,746	5,931	7	181	
26 April 2020	473	13,331	7,024	6,118	8	189	
27 April 2020	482	13,813	7,327	6,288	9	198	
28 April 2020	552	14,365	7,710	6,448	9	207	
29 April 2020	770	15,135	8,057	6,862	9	216	
30 April 2020	888	16,023	8,580	7,216	11	227	
1 May 2020	985	17,008	9,018	7,756	7	234	
2 May 2020	1,427	18,435	9,572	8,616	13	247	
3 May 2020	1,228	19,663	10,041	9,362	13	260	
4 May 2020	980	20,643	10,415	9,958	10	270	
5 May 2020	1,373	22,016	10,710	11,031	5	275	
6 May 2020	1,032	23,048	11,189	11,578	6	281	
7 May 2020	1,533	24,581	11,664	12,632	4	285	
8 May 2020	1,391	25,972	12,160	13,518	9	294	
9 May 2020	1,247	27,219	12,667	14,248	10	304	
10 May 2020	1,647	28,866	13,112	15,442	8	312	
11 May 2020	1,197	30,063	13,605	16,135	11	323	
12 May 2020	1,658	31,721	14,125	17,261	12	335	
13 May 2020	2,660	34,381	14,865	19,170	11	346	
14 May 2020	2,659	37,040	15,655	21,017	22	368	
15 May 2020	2,502	39,542	16,614	22,534	26	394	
16 May 2020	1,886	41,428	18,014	22,993	27	421	
17 May 2020	2,353	43,781	19,213	24,118	29	450	
18 May 2020	2,278	46,059	20,165	25,416	28	478	
19 May 2020	3,520	49,579	21,507	27,563	31	509	
20 May 2020	4,038	53,617	22,504	30,569	35	544	
21 May 2020	3,964	57,581	23,992	33,000	45	589	
22 May 2020	4,276	61,857	25,342	35,885	41	630	
23 May 2020	3,536	65,393	26,546	38,174	43	673	
24 May 2020	3,709	69,102	28,148	40,236	45	718	
25 May 2020	4,895	73,997	29,302	43,934	43	761	
26 May 2020	3,964	77,961	30,915	46,240	45	806	
27 May 2020	4,328	82,289	33,540	47,908	35	841	
28 May 2020	4,654	86,943	36,150	49,903	49	890	
29 May 2020	3,695	90,638	38,598	51,096	54	944	
30 May 2020	4,220	94,858	40,431	53,430	53	997	
31 May 2020	4,830	99,688	42,727	55,907	57	1,054	
1 June 2020	5,471	105,159	44,946	59,100	59	1,113	
2 June 2020	3,527	108,686	Unknown	21,325	75	1,188	
3 June 2020	4,942	113,628	Unknown	21,605	87	1,275	
4 June 2020	4,664	118,292	Unknown	21,305	81	1,356	
5 June 2020	4,207	122,499	Unknown	21,693	92	1,448	
6 June 2020	5,246	127,745	Unknown	22,387	93	1,541	
7 June 2020	6,405	134,150	Unknown	24,363	649	2,190	
8 June 2020	4,696	138,846	Unknown	24,334	74	2,264	
9 June 2020	3,913	142,759	Unknown	23,115	19	2,283	
10 June 2020	5,737	148,496	Unknown	24,201	192	2,475	
11 June 2020	5,596	154,092	Unknown	25,000	173	2,648	
12 June 2020	6,754	160,846	Unknown	26,618	222	2,870	
13 June 2020	6,509	167,355	Unknown	26,958	231	3,101	
14 June 2020	6,938	174,293	Unknown	27,266	222	3,323	
15 June 2020	5,143	179,436	Unknown	27,282	39	3,362	
16 June 2020	5,013	184,449	Unknown	24,834	21	3,383	
17 June 2020 (Note: On 17 June 2020, the Ministry of Health informed additional 31,412 cases that had delayed positive tests in previous weeks.)	4,757	220,628	Unknown	35,082	232	3,615	
17 June 2020	31,412	220,628	Unknown	35,082	232	3,615	
18 June 2020	4,475	225,103	Unknown	34,821	226	3,841	
19 June 2020	6,290	231,393	Unknown	35,809	252	4,093	
20 June 2020	5,355	236,748	Unknown	35,844	202	4,295	7,144
21 June 2020	5,607	242,355	Unknown	37,307	184	4,479	
22 June 2020	4,608	246,963	Unknown	37,064	23	4,502	
23 June 2020	3,804	250,767	Unknown	35,692	3	4,505	
24 June 2020	3,649	254,416	Unknown	34,592	226	4,731	
25 June 2020	4,648	259,064	Unknown	34,834	172	4,903	
26 June 2020	4,296	263,360	Unknown	34,861	165	5,068	
27 June 2020	4,406	267,766	Unknown	34,364	279	5,347	
28 June 2020	4,216	271,982	Unknown	34,263	162	5,509	8,935
29 June 2020	4,017	275,999	236,154	34,270	66	5,575	
30 June 2020	3,394	279,393	241,229	32,476	113	5,688	
1 July 2020	2,650	282,043	245,443	30,847	65	5,753	
2 July 2020	2,498	284,541	249,247	29,374	167	5,920	
3 July 2020	3,548	288,089	253,343	28,695	131	6,051	
4 July 2020	3,758	291,847	253,343	32,312	141	6,192	
5 July 2020	3,685	295,532	261,032	28,194	116	6,308	10,159
6 July 2020	3,025	298,557	264,371	27,804	76	6,384	
7 July 2020	2,462	301,019	268,245	26,340	50	6,434	
8 July 2020	2,064	303,083	271,703	24,807	139	6,573	
9 July 2020	3,133	306,216	274,992	24,542	109	6,682	
10 July 2020	3,058	309,274	278,053	24,440	99	6,781	
11 July 2020	2,755	312,029	281,114	24,034	100	6,881	11,227
12 July 2020	3,012	315,041	283,902	24,166	98	6,979	
13 July 2020	2,616	317,657	286,556	24,077	45	7,024	
14 July 2020	1,836	319,493	289,220	23,205	45	7,069	
15 July 2020	1,712	321,205	292,085	21,934	117	7,186	
16 July 2020	2,475	323,680	295,301	21,107	104	7,290	
17 July 2020	2,840	326,520	296,814	21,378	1,057	8,347	
18 July 2020	2,185	328,846	299,449	20,952	98	8,445	
19 July 2020	2,082	330,930	301,794	20,633	58	8,503	
20 July 2020	2,099	333,029	303,992	20,404	130	8,633	
21 July 2020	1,656	334,683	306,816	19,190	44	8,677	
22 July 2020	1,741	336,402	309,241	18,439	45	8,722	
23 July 2020	2,371	338,759	311,431	18,490	116	8,838	13,203
24 July 2020	2,545	341,304	313,696	18,694	76	8,914	
25 July 2020	2,287	343,592	316,169	18,403	106	9,020	
26 July 2020	2,198	345,790	318,095	18,583	92	9,112	
27 July 2020	2,133	347,923	319,954	18,782	75	9,187	
28 July 2020	1,876	349,800	322,332	18,228	53	9,240	
29 July 2020	1,773	351,575	324,557	17,740	38	9,278	
30 July 2020	1,948	353,536	326,628	17,531	99	9,377	
31 July 2020	2,123	355,667	328,327	17,883	80	9,457	13,426
1 August 2020	1,979	357,658	330,507	17,621	76	9,533	
2 August 2020	2,081	359,731	332,411	17,712	75	9,608	
3 August 2020	1,762	361,493	333,976	17,810	99	9,707	
4 August 2020	1,462	362,962	336,330	16,887	38	9,745	
5 August 2020	1,781	364,723	338,291	16,640	46	9,791	
6 August 2020	1,947	366,671	340,168	16,614	98	9,889	
7 August 2020	2,149	368,825	342,168	16,699	69	9,958	13,939
8 August 2020	2,201	371,023	344,133	16,880	53	10,011	
9 August 2020	2,036	373,056	345,826	17,153	66	10,077	
10 August 2020	1,988	375,044	347,342	17,563	62	10,139	
11 August 2020	1,566	376,616	349,541	16,897	39	10,178	
12 August 2020	1,540	378,168	351,419	16,544	27	10,205	
13 August 2020	1,852	380,034	353,131	16,604	94	10,299	
14 August 2020	2,077	382,111	355,037	16,734	41	10,340	14,407
15 August 2020	1,777	383,902	356,951	16,556	55	10,395	
16 August 2020	2,086	385,946	358,828	16,666	57	10,452	
17 August 2020	1,556	387,502	360,385	16,604	61	10,513	
18 August 2020	1,336	388,855	362,440	15,869	33	10,546	
19 August 2020	1,233	390,037	364,285	15,174	32	10,578	
20 August 2020	1,813	391,849	366,063	15,116	93	10,671	
21 August 2020	1,920	393,769	367,897	15,149	52	10,723	14,938
22 August 2020	1,926	395,708	369,730	15,186	69	10,792	
23 August 2020	1,942	397,665	371,179	15,634	60	10,852	
24 August 2020	1,903	399,568	372,464	16,188	64	10,916	15,108
25 August 2020	1,406	400,985	374,463	15,564	42	10,958	
26 August 2020	1,371	402,365	376,268	15,107	32	10,990	
27 August 2020	1,739	404,102	377,922	15,108	82	11,072	
28 August 2020	1,868	405,972	379,452	15,388	60	11,132	15,505
29 August 2020	2,033	408,009	381,183	15,645	49	11,181	
30 August 2020	1,966	409,974	382,584	16,146	63	11,244	
31 August 2020	1,753	411,726	383,879	16,558	45	11,289	15,608
1 September 2020	1,415	413,145	385,790	16,034	32	11,321	
2 September 2020	1,582	414,739	387,683	15,712	23	11,344	
3 September 2020	1,758	416,501	389,409	15,670	78	11,422	
4 September 2020	1,965	418,469	391,248	15,727	72	11,494	15,869
5 September 2020	1,961	420,434	392,967	15,916	57	11,551	
6 September 2020	2,077	422,510	394,399	16,519	41	11,592	
7 September 2020	1,764	424,274	395,717	16,905	60	11,652	15,924
8 September 2020	1,263	425,541	397,730	16,129	30	11,682	
9 September 2020	1,482	427,027	399,555	15,770	20	11,702	
10 September 2020	1,639	428,669	401,356	15,532	79	11,781	
11 September 2020	1,860	430,535	403,064	15,621	69	11,850	16,165
12 September 2020	2,135	432,666	404,919	15,852	45	11,895	
13 September 2020	2,082	434,748	406,326	16,473	54	11,949	
14 September 2020	1,685	436,433	407,725	16,695	64	12,013	16,399
15 September 2020	1,536	437,983	409,944	15,999	27	12,040	
16 September 2020	1,305	439,287	411,853	15,377	18	12,058	
17 September 2020	1,860	441,150	413,928	15,080	84	12,142	
18 September 2020	1,673	442,827	415,981	14,647	57	12,199	16,688
19 September 2020	1,848	444,674	418,101	14,319	55	12,254	
20 September 2020	1,600	446,274	419,746	14,242	32	12,286	
21 September 2020	1,194	447,468	421,111	14,059	12	12,298	16,744
22 September 2020	1,054	448,523	423,176	13,026	23	12,321	
23 September 2020	1,372	449,903	425,165	12,393	24	12,345	
24 September 2020	1,731	451,634	426,876	12,289	124	12,469	
25 September 2020	2,222	453,868	428,580	12,761	58	12,527	17,075
26 September 2020	2,109	455,979	430,259	13,129	64	12,591	
27 September 2020	1,923	457,901	431,704	13,556	50	12,641	
28 September 2020	1,770	459,671	433,016	13,957	57	12,698	17,210
29 September 2020	1,622	461,300	434,794	13,781	27	12,725	
30 September 2020	1,684	462,991	436,589	13,661	16	12,741	
1 October 2020	1,760	464,750	438,148	13,780	81	12,822	
2 October 2020	1,839	466,590	439,607	14,116	45	12,867	
2 October 2020	1,839	466,590	439,607	14,116	45	12,867	17,427
3 October 2020	1,880	468,471	440,881	14,671	52	12,919	
4 October 2020	1,708	470,179	442,070	15,130	60	12,979	
5 October 2020	1,567	471,746	443,453	15,256	58	13,037	17,658
6 October 2020	1,554	473,306	445,418	14,818	33	13,070	
7 October 2020	1,131	474,440	447,053	14,297	20	13,090	
8 October 2020	1,575	476,016	448,710	14,139	77	13,167	
9 October 2020	1,750	477,769	450,297	14,252	53	13,220	17,958
10 October 2020	1,824	479,595	452,054	14,269	52	13,272	
11 October 2020	1,776	481,371	453,352	14,701	46	13,318	
12 October 2020	1,517	482,888	454,484	15,025	61	13,379	18,058
13 October 2020	1,392	484,280	456,499	14,385	17	13,396	
14 October 2020	1,089	485,372	458,073	13,884	19	13,415	
15 October 2020	1,122	486,496	459,536	13,526	19	13,434	
16 October 2020	1,689	488,190	461,097	13,564	95	13,529	18,248
17 October 2020	1,811	490,003	462,712	13,703	59	13,588	
18 October 2020	1,759	491,760	463,943	14,182	47	13,635	
19 October 2020	1,545	493,305	465,021	14,608	41	13,676	18,429
20 October 2020	1,099	494,478	466,643	14,049	26	13,702	
21 October 2020	1,152	495,637	468,269	13,565	17	13,719	
22 October 2020	1,495	497,131	469,765	13,490	73	13,792	
23 October 2020	1,773	498,906	471,343	13,635	52	13,844	18,690
24 October 2020	1,631	500,542	476,576	9,990	48	13,892	
25 October 2020	1,540	502,063	478,252	9,784	52	13,944	
26 October 2020	1,505	503,598	479,877	9,634	59	14,003	18,825
27 October 2020	922	504,525	481,379	9,035	23	14,026	
28 October 2020	1,004	505,530	482,906	8,507	6	14,032	
29 October 2020	1,519	507,050	483,922	8,925	86	14,118	
30 October 2020	1,529	508,571	485,152	9,176	40	14,158	19,009
31 October 2020	1,686	510,256	486,642	9,121	49	14,207	
1 November 2020	1,607	511,864	488,166	9,164	40	14,247	
2 November 2020	1,314	513,188	489,525	9,074	55	14,302	19,193
3 November 2020	1,009	514,202	490,820	8,776	17	14,319	
4 November 2020	846	515,042	492,149	8,266	21	14,340	
5 November 2020	1,540	516,582	493,250	8,640	64	14,404	
6 November 2020	1,801	518,390	494,303	9,346	46	14,450	19,382
7 November 2020	1,568	519,977	495,852	9,334	49	14,499	
8 November 2020	1,576	521,558	497,411	9,311	44	14,543	
9 November 2020	1,318	522,879	498,904	9,094	45	14,588	19,547
10 November 2020	1,083	523,907	500,142	8,861	23	14,611	
11 November 2020	904	524,804	501,426	8,451	22	14,633	
12 November 2020	1,631	526,438	502,475	8,968	66	14,699	
13 November 2020	1,592	528,030	503,540	9,454	39	14,738	19,733
14 November 2020	1,644	529,676	505,243	9,358	39	14,777	
15 November 2020	1,597	531,273	506,700	9,455	42	14,819	
16 November 2020	1,331	532,604	508,067	9,374	44	14,863	19,891
17 November 2020	1,003	533,610	509,401	9,025	20	14,883	
18 November 2020	945	534,558	510,766	8,592	14	14,897	
19 November 2020	1,455	536,012	511,874	8,880	58	14,955	
20 November 2020	1,573	537,585	512,927	9,351	48	15,003	20,052
21 November 2020	1,550	539,143	514,584	9,224	27	15,030	
22 November 2020	1,497	540,640	516,121	9,145	39	15,069	
23 November 2020	1,440	542,080	517,524	9,144	37	15,106	20,178
24 November 2020	1,005	543,087	518,834	8,816	25	15,131	
25 November 2020	1,004	544,092	520,180	8,468	7	15,138	
26 November 2020	1,564	545,662	521,247	8,872	97	15,235	
27 November 2020	1,570	547,223	522,259	9,379	43	15,278	20,386
28 November 2020	1,718	548,941	523,792	9,519	44	15,322	
29 November 2020	1,489	550,430	525,212	9,554	34	15,356	
30 November 2020	1,313	551,743	526,604	9,418	54	15,410	20,552
1 December 2020	1,119	552,864	528,034	9,089	20	15,430	
2 December 2020	1,035	553,898	529,501	8,647	8	15,438	
3 December 2020	1,507	555,406	530,470	9,104	81	15,519	
4 December 2020	1,729	557,135	531,543	9,719	39	15,558	20,716
5 December 2020	1,533	558,668	533,250	9,509	34	15,592	
6 December 2020	1,710	560,382	534,789	9,646	36	15,628	
7 December 2020	1,760	562,142	536,267	9,892	35	15,663	20,902
8 December 2020	1,389	563,534	537,727	9,806	17	15,680	
9 December 2020	1,247	564,778	539,171	9,596	10	15,690	
10 December 2020	1,662	566,440	540,288	10,057	84	15,774	
11 December 2020	1,531	567,974	541,345	10,526	8	15,782	21,151
12 December 2020	1,807	569,781	543,083	10,530	64	15,846	
13 December 2020	2,139	571,919	544,822	10,887	40	15,886	
14 December 2020	1,911	573,830	546,538	11,035	45	15,931	
15 December 2020	1,498	575,329	548,190	10,864	18	15,949	21,230
16 December 2020	1,402	576,731	549,852	10,594	10	15,959	
17 December 2020	1,998	578,732	551,200	11,199	48	16,007	
18 December 2020	2,404	581,135	552,289	12,468	44	16,051	21,421
19 December 2020	2,217	583,354	554,333	12,591	50	16,101	
20 December 2020	2,191	585,545	555,956	13,105	53	16,154	
21 December 2020	1,943	587,488	557,913	13,047	43	16,197	21,559
22 December 2020	1,699	589,189	559,845	12,794	20	16,217	
23 December 2020	1,726	590,914	561,794	12,561	11	16,228	
24 December 2020	2,395	593,310	563,457	13,214	75	16,303	
25 December 2020	2,520	595,831	565,002	14,133	55	16,358	21,780
26 December 2020	2,564	598,394	567,376	14,275	46	16,404	
27 December 2020	1,711	600,105	569,578	13,745	39	16,443	
28 December 2020	1,923	602,028	571,674	13,572	0	16,443	21,921
29 December 2020	1,958	603,986	573,681	13,477	45	16,488	
30 December 2020	1,961	605,950	575,595	13,514	11	16,499	
31 December 2020	3,022	608,973	577,382	14,638	109	16,608	
1 January 2021	3,588	612,564	579,203	16,355	52	16,660	
2 January 2021	3,338	615,902	581,961	16,870	64	16,724	22,264
3 January 2021	2,289	618,191	584,457	16,620	43	16,767	
4 January 2021	2,450	620,641	586,900	16,626	0	16,767	22,421
5 January 2021	2,457	623,101	589,081	16,885	21	16,788	
6 January 2021	2,378	625,483	591,081	17,239	28	16,816	
7 January 2021	3,685	629,176	593,235	18,679	97	16,913	
8 January 2021	4,201	633,381	595,799	20,259	61	16,974	22,754
9 January 2021	4,361	637,742	599,604	20,749	63	17,037	
10 January 2021	4,181	641,923	602,861	21,613	59	17,096	
11 January 2021	3,970	645,892	606,055	22,309	66	17,162	22,983
12 January 2021	3,238	649,135	608,804	22,798	20	17,182	
13 January 2021	3,394	652,525	611,564	23,407	22	17,204	
14 January 2021	4,177	656,712	614,267	24,800	90	17,294	
15 January 2021	4,471	661,180	617,372	26,088	75	17,369	23,162
16 January 2021	4,313	665,493	622,321	25,442	66	17,435	
17 January 2021	4,340	669,832	626,528	25,429	42	17,477	
18 January 2021	3,918	673,750	630,818	25,008	70	17,547	23,245
19 January 2021	3,400	677,151	634,960	24,246	26	17,573	
20 January 2021	3,583	680,740	639,091	23,647	21	17,594	
21 January 2021	4,363	685,107	642,004	25,048	108	17,702	
22 January 2021	4,956	690,066	645,035	26,889	84	17,786	23,611
23 January 2021	4,550	694,647	649,802	26,633	68	17,854	
24 January 2021	4,498	699,110	654,101	26,682	79	17,933	
25 January 2021	4,068	703,178	658,324	26,475	66	17,999	23,963
26 January 2021	3,322	706,500	662,460	25,659	24	18,023	
27 January 2021	3,371	709,888	666,799	24,690	17	18,040	
28 January 2021	4,260	714,143	670,336	25,259	134	18,174	
29 January 2021	4,606	718,749	673,582	26,535	83	18,257	24,317
30 January 2021	4,160	722,900	677,602	26,594	82	18,339	
31 January 2021	4,209	727,109	681,981	26,290	113	18,452	
1 February 2021	3,779	730,888	686,374	25,589	85	18,537	24,717
2 February 2021	3,138	734,035	690,653	24,457	22	18,559	
3 February 2021	2,616	736,645	694,960	22,739	17	18,576	
4 February 2021	3,589	740,237	698,248	22,887	155	18,731	
5 February 2021	3,786	744,019	701,315	23,521	77	18,808	25,062
6 February 2021	4,063	748,082	706,020	22,791	87	18,895	
7 February 2021	3,804	751,886	710,029	22,493	79	18,974	
8 February 2021	3,464	755,350	713,711	22,194	82	19,056	25,410
9 February 2021	2,829	758,189	717,308	21,418	28	19,084	
10 February 2021	2,399	760,576	720,852	20,239	21	19,105	
11 February 2021	3,729	764,307	723,493	21,171	157	19,262	
12 February 2021	4,169	768,471	725,945	22,799	83	19,345	25,822
13 February 2021	3,920	772,395	730,204	22,363	98	19,443	
14 February 2021	3,815	776,209	733,731	22,484	98	19,541	
15 February 2021	3,333	779,541	737,126	22,399	83	19,624	26,209
16 February 2021	2,547	782,039	740,465	21,539	20	19,644	
17 February 2021	2,330	784,314	743,306	20,958	15	19,659	
18 February 2021	3,866	788,142	746,314	21,636	139	19,798	
19 February 2021	3,827	791,939	748,920	22,728	99	19,897	26,605
20 February 2021	3,893	795,845	753,037	22,438	77	19,974	
21 February 2021	3,618	799,460	756,764	22,202	68	20,042	
22 February 2021	3,547	803,009	760,577	21,904	84	20,126	26,922
23 February 2021	2,356	805,317	763,904	20,848	25	20,151	
24 February 2021	2,554	807,872	767,332	19,970	22	20,173	
25 February 2021	4,181	812,344	770,190	21,383	137	20,310	
26 February 2021	4,586	816,929	772,951	23,178	90	20,400	27,249
27 February 2021	4,523	821,418	776,955	23,585	76	20,476	
28 February 2021	4,208	825,625	780,530	24,106	96	20,572	
1 March 2021	4,082	829,770	784,213	24,466	88	20,660	27,547
2 March 2021	2,747	832,512	787,700	23,721	24	20,684	
3 March 2021	3,053	835,552	790,528	23,913	20	20,704	
4 March 2021	4,567	840,119	793,819	25,051	134	20,838	
5 March 2021	5,325	845,450	796,791	27,317	90	20,928	27,902
6 March 2021	5,037	850,483	801,537	27,523	80	21,008	
7 March 2021	5,280	855,785	805,717	28,557	69	21,077	
8 March 2021	4,733	860,533	809,941	28,987	86	21,163	28,132
9 March 2021	3,528	864,064	814,088	28,371	19	21,182	
10 March 2021	3,958	867,949	818,337	27,982	24	21,206	
11 March 2021	5,566	873,512	821,294	30,428	156	21,362	
12 March 2021	5,983	879,485	824,899	32,707	89	21,451	28,550
13 March 2021	5,928	885,379	830,698	32,705	123	21,574	
14 March 2021	5,734	891,110	835,669	33,290	100	21,674	
15 March 2021	5,117	896,231	840,668	33,379	98	21,772	29,009
16 March 2021	4,591	900,782	845,712	32,867	17	21,789	
17 March 2021	4,395	905,212	851,154	31,826	27	21,816	
18 March 2021	6,249	911,469	854,827	34,228	172	21,988	
19 March 2021	6,604	918,053	859,097	36,433	99	22,087	29,540
20 March 2021	7,084	925,089	865,413	37,048	93	22,180	
21 March 2021	6,836	931,939	871,234	37,958	99	22,279	
22 March 2021	6,155	938,094	877,189	38,024	80	22,359	29,813
23 March 2021	4,948	942,958	882,772	37,304	25	22,384	
24 March 2021	4,826	947,783	888,826	36,054	18	22,402	
25 March 2021	7,023	954,762	892,973	38,699	122	22,524	
26 March 2021	7,626	962,321	897,975	41,151	63	22,587	30,251
27 March 2021	7,588	969,913	905,435	41,177	66	22,653	
28 March 2021	7,326	977,243	912,058	41,767	101	22,754	
29 March 2021	7,247	984,484	918,446	42,509	316	23,070	30,671
30 March 2021	5,394	989,492	924,612	41,335	37	23,107	
31 March 2021	6,053	995,538	931,270	40,696	28	23,135	
1 April 2021	7,830	1,003,406	936,721	42,915	193	23,328	
2 April 2021	8,112	1,011,485	942,413	45,202	93	23,421	31,151
3 April 2021	8,028	1,019,478	950,889	44,584	103	23,524	
4 April 2021	7,304	1,026,785	958,400	44,261	120	23,644	
5 April 2021	5,807	1,032,612	965,641	42,794	33	23,677	31,513
6 April 2021	5,164	1,037,780	972,645	40,904	57	23,734	
7 April 2021	5,134	1,043,022	980,245	38,496	62	23,796	
8 April 2021	8,195	1,051,270	986,285	40,514	183	23,979	
9 April 2021	9,171	1,060,421	991,676	44,143	129	24,108	32,088
10 April 2021	8,124	1,068,522	998,400	45,413	105	24,213	
11 April 2021	7,945	1,076,499	1,005,860	45,792	133	24,346	
12 April 2021	6,372	1,082,920	1,012,904	45,021	137	24,483	32,469
13 April 2021	5,718	1,088,710	1,020,925	42,761	35	24,518	
14 April 2021	5,497	1,094,267	1,026,934	42,278	30	24,548	
15 April 2021	7,357	1,101,698	1,033,189	43,229	218	24,766	
16 April 2021	7,590	1,109,311	1,037,539	46,492	157	24,923	33,207
17 April 2021	7,696	1,117,348	1,045,807	45,965	132	25,055	
18 April 2021	7,294	1,124,718	1,053,635	45,377	122	25,177	
19 April 2021	6,643	1,131,340	1,060,826	44,701	100	25,277	33,687
20 April 2021	5,071	1,136,435	1,067,662	42,920	40	25,317	
21 April 2021	4,914	1,141,403	1,074,827	40,686	36	25,353	
22 April 2021	6,832	1,148,320	1,081,117	41,128	180	25,533	
23 April 2021	7,525	1,155,902	1,084,831	44,878	109	25,642	32,813
24 April 2021	6,796	1,162,811	1,092,934	43,577	101	25,743	
25 April 2021	6,638	1,169,536	1,099,918	43,174	114	25,857	
26 April 2021	6,078	1,175,614	1,106,862	42,195	119	25,976	33,132
27 April 2021	4,141	1,179,772	1,113,463	39,717	45	26,021	
28 April 2021	4,416	1,184,271	1,120,141	37,481	53	26,074	
29 April 2021	6,889	1,190,991	1,125,761	38,388	174	26,248	
30 April 2021	7,199	1,198,245	1,129,347	41,944	106	26,354	33,623
1 May 2021	6,469	1,204,755	1,136,816	40,865	104	26,458	
2 May 2021	6,122	1,210,920	1,143,565	40,142	104	26,562	
3 May 2021	4,874	1,215,815	1,149,795	38,732	98	26,660	34,001
4 May 2021	3,198	1,219,064	1,155,630	36,108	37	26,697	
5 May 2021	3,791	1,222,949	1,160,945	34,644	30	26,727	
6 May 2021	6,202	1,229,248	1,166,227	35,469	169	26,896	
7 May 2021	6,574	1,235,778	1,170,437	37,663	109	27,005	34,450
8 May 2021	6,219	1,241,976	1,177,342	36,852	97	27,102	
9 May 2021	5,521	1,247,469	1,183,155	36,406	117	27,219	
10 May 2021	5,357	1,252,808	1,188,831	35,954	100	27,319	34,863
11 May 2021	3,771	1,256,546	1,193,927	34,564	38	27,357	
12 May 2021	3,920	1,260,448	1,199,432	32,932	28	27,385	
13 May 2021	6,181	1,266,601	1,204,176	34,192	136	27,521	
14 May 2021	6,903	1,273,516	1,208,396	36,746	127	27,648	35,315
15 May 2021	6,769	1,280,252	1,214,817	36,964	87	27,735	
16 May 2021	6,320	1,286,548	1,220,351	37,617	98	27,833	
17 May 2021	5,566	1,292,096	1,225,846	37,560	102	27,935	35,709
18 May 2021	3,787	1,295,862	1,231,047	36,097	31	27,966	
19 May 2021	4,778	1,300,629	1,236,581	35,294	32	27,998	
20 May 2021	7,680	1,308,311	1,241,426	37,901	172	28,170	
21 May 2021	7,614	1,315,913	1,245,988	40,849	121	28,291	36,180
22 May 2021	7,514	1,323,413	1,252,970	41,261	96	28,387	
23 May 2021	6,519	1,329,918	1,259,080	41,510	132	28,519	
24 May 2021	5,374	1,335,261	1,265,116	40,780	30	28,549	36,546
25 May 2021	4,188	1,339,421	1,270,769	39,243	37	28,586	
26 May 2021	5,176	1,344,618	1,277,019	38,145	39	28,625	
27 May 2021	8,117	1,352,723	1,282,561	40,510	185	28,810	
28 May 2021	8,680	1,361,381	1,287,804	43,793	119	28,929	37,066
29 May 2021	8,426	1,369,756	1,295,646	44,186	119	29,048	
30 May 2021	7,772	1,377,507	1,302,518	44,928	121	29,169	
31 May 2021	6,882	1,384,346	1,309,040	45,104	132	29,301	37,614
1 June 2021	5,040	1,389,357	1,315,860	43,239	44	29,345	
2 June 2021	5,631	1,394,973	1,321,600	43,069	41	29,386	
3 June 2021	8,150	1,403,101	1,327,643	44,913	213	29,599	
4 June 2021	8,273	1,411,346	1,333,631	47,051	98	29,697	38,171
5 June 2021	8,867	1,420,266	1,342,080	47,388	120	29,817	
6 June 2021	7,768	1,427,956	1,347,676	49,356	121	29,938	
7 June 2021	6,958	1,434,884	1,355,224	48,596	121	30,059	38,685
8 June 2021	5,568	1,440,417	1,362,431	46,874	46	30,105	
9 June 2021	5,369	1,445,770	1,369,856	44,757	37	30,142	
10 June 2021	7,716	1,453,478	1,376,335	45,774	198	30,340	
11 June 2021	7,972	1,461,419	1,382,124	47,777	133	30,473	39,249
12 June 2021	7,624	1,468,992	1,391,016	46,337	107	30,580	
13 June 2021	7,529	1,476,473	1,399,187	45,506	128	30,708	
14 June 2021	6,234	1,482,663	1,406,555	44,217	97	30,805	39,750
15 June 2021	4,607	1,487,239	1,413,414	41,868	61	30,866	
16 June 2021	4,347	1,491,561	1,420,365	39,176	57	30,923	
17 June 2021	6,683	1,498,231	1,426,275	39,698	218	31,141	
18 June 2021	6,770	1,505,001	1,431,515	41,091	119	31,260	40,365
19 June 2021	6,263	1,511,275	1,439,182	39,834	133	31,393	
20 June 2021	5,753	1,517,018	1,445,703	38,630	121	31,514	
21 June 2021	5,252	1,522,223	1,452,108	37,284	132	31,646	
22 June 2021	3,464	1,525,663	1,456,672	36,114	45	31,691	
23 June 2021	2,768	1,528,409	1,462,966	32,507	56	31,747	
24 June 2021	3,448	1,531,872	1,468,137	30,735	51	31,798	
25 June 2021	5,628	1,537,471	1,472,337	31,897	215	32,013	41,289
26 June 2021	5,208	1,542,642	1,478,841	30,389	151	32,164	
27 June 2021	4,488	1,547,103	1,484,410	29,118	135	32,299	
28 June 2021	4,075	1,551,137	1,489,537	27,847	156	32,455	41,818
29 June 2021	2,648	1,553,774	1,494,284	25,688	35	32,490	
30 June 2021	2,148	1,555,902	1,498,792	23,242	56	32,546	
1 July 2021	2,677	1,558,557	1,502,411	22,224	43	32,589	
2 July 2021	4,086	1,562,613	1,505,708	22,739	221	32,810	42,323
3 July 2021	3,880	1,566,461	1,509,297	22,809	164	32,974	
4 July 2021	3,368	1,569,784	1,513,495	21,709	130	33,104	
5 July 2021	2,852	1,572,608	1,517,303	20,647	146	33,250	42,901
6 July 2021	1,885	1,574,465	1,520,879	18,883	39	33,289	
7 July 2021	1,892	1,576,336	1,524,232	17,357	40	33,329	
8 July 2021	3,193	1,579,591	1,527,050	17,590	186	33,515	
9 July 2021	2,906	1,582,391	1,529,269	18,027	122	33,637	43,417
10 July 2021	2,696	1,585,160	1,532,078	17,843	131	33,768	
11 July 2021	2,330	1,587,478	1,535,072	17,043	110	33,878	
12 July 2021	2,160	1,589,623	1,537,815	16,325	103	33,981	43,855
13 July 2021	1,278	1,590,887	1,540,595	14,766	36	34,017	
14 July 2021	1,227	1,592,130	1,543,171	13,403	33	34,050	
15 July 2021	2,336	1,594,496	1,545,186	13,569	158	34,208	
16 July 2021	2,031	1,596,549	1,547,042	13,652	102	34,310	44,270
17 July 2021	1,874	1,598,481	1,549,660	12,863	94	34,404	
18 July 2021	1,419	1,599,879	1,551,119	12,671	111	34,515	
19 July 2021	1,015	1,600,883	1,553,145	11,575	25	34,540	44,639
20 July 2021	902	1,601,858	1,555,294	10,400	30	34,570	
21 July 2021	989	1,602,854	1,557,199	9,461	42	34,612	
22 July 2021	1,861	1,604,713	1,558,669	9,647	181	34,793	
23 July 2021	1,656	1,606,358	1,559,891	9,970	83	34,876	44,981
24 July 2021	1,407	1,607,749	1,561,758	9,399	83	34,959	
25 July 2021	1,446	1,609,177	1,563,280	9,227	68	35,027	
26 July 2021	1,185	1,610,345	1,564,777	8,794	93	35,120	45,312
27 July 2021	753	1,611,090	1,566,138	8,141	32	35,152	
28 July 2021	828	1,611,917	1,567,236	7,842	25	35,177	
29 July 2021	1,383	1,613,288	1,568,294	8,017	119	35,296	
30 July 2021	1,355	1,614,629	1,568,981	8,593	71	35,367	45,646
31 July 2021	1,152	1,615,771	1,570,492	8,125	82	35,449	
1 August 2021	1,185	1,616,942	1,571,788	7,874	80	35,529	
2 August 2021	921	1,617,852	1,573,007	7,504	88	35,617	45,933
3 August 2021	616	1,618,457	1,574,176	6,914	24	35,641	
4 August 2021	674	1,619,183	1,575,377	6,402	31	35,672	
5 August 2021	1,223	1,620,389	1,576,242	6,591	135	35,807	
6 August 2021	1,147	1,621,571	1,576,801	7,125	74	35,881	46,309
7 August 2021	940	1,622,509	1,577,982	6,804	71	35,952	
8 August 2021	868	1,623,363	1,579,137	6,379	65	36,017	
9 August 2021	871	1,624,316	1,580,173	6,261	91	36,108	46,609
10 August 2021	514	1,624,823	1,581,129	5,778	31	36,139	
11 August 2021	584	1,625,456	1,582,029	5,489	19	36,158	
12 August 2021	1,128	1,626,594	1,582,781	5,744	86	36,244	
13 August 2021	882	1,627,428	1,583,180	6,105	44	36,288	46,818
14 August 2021	877	1,628,293	1,584,227	5,854	44	36,332	
15 August 2021	904	1,629,192	1,585,156	5,728	49	36,381	
16 August 2021	754	1,629,932	1,585,995	5,573	40	36,421	46,975
17 August 2021	405	1,630,330	1,586,798	5,160	18	36,439	
18 August 2021	503	1,630,831	1,587,619	4,812	18	36,457	
19 August 2021	899	1,631,689	1,588,236	4,933	68	36,525	
20 August 2021	763	1,632,441	1,588,536	5,324	42	36,567	47,199
21 August 2021	698	1,633,153	1,589,484	5,024	39	36,606	
22 August 2021	679	1,633,816	1,590,252	4,853	45	36,651	
22 August 2021	679	1,633,816	1,590,252	4,853	45	36,651	
23 August 2021	591	1,634,394	1,590,973	4,625	38	36,689	47,303
24 August 2021	387	1,634,774	1,591,555	4,423	13	36,702	
25 August 2021	392	1,635,173	1,592,238	4,115	17	36,719	
26 August 2021	801	1,635,958	1,592,707	4,327	60	36,779	
27 August 2021	672	1,636,627	1,593,188	4,453	29	36,808	47,504
28 August 2021	607	1,637,234	1,593,985	4,206	34	36,842	
29 August 2021	603	1,637,829	1,594,585	4,143	44	36,886	
30 August 2021	512	1,638,330	1,595,170	3,982	38	36,924	47,613
31 August 2021	315	1,638,675	1,595,747	3,749	14	36,938	
1 September 2021	375	1,639,123	1,596,357	3,568	8	36,946	
2 September 2021	594	1,639,698	1,596,763	3,648	50	36,996	
3 September 2021	504	1,640,192	1,597,118	3,717	46	37,042	47,781
4 September 2021	477	1,640,666	1,597,772	3,486	26	37,068	
5 September 2021	430	1,641,091	1,598,293	3,342	23	37,091	
6 September 2021	435	1,641,526	1,598,800	3,235	18	37,109	47,835
7 September 2021	273	1,641,791	1,599,267	3,012	7	37,116	
8 September 2021	358	1,642,146	1,599,708	2,910	7	37,123	
9 September 2021	515	1,642,646	1,600,055	2,996	37	37,160	
10 September 2021	518	1,643,156	1,600,353	3,156	19	37,179	
11 September 2021	489	1,643,630	1,600,771	3,166	23	37,202	
12 September 2021	449	1,644,071	1,601,269	3,061	31	37,233	
13 September 2021	426	1,644,540	1,601,589	3,160	21	37,254	48,032
14 September 2021	297	1,644,832	1,601,955	3,086	0	37,254	
15 September 2021	408	1,645,233	1,602,392	3,026	8	37,262	
16 September 2021	604	1,645,820	1,602,703	3,223	32	37,294	
17 September 2021	594	1,646,403	1,603,006	3,460	25	37,319	48,138
18 September 2021	610	1,646,994	1,603,507	3,507	21	37,340	
19 September 2021	491	1,647,469	1,603,934	3,504	20	37,360	
20 September 2021	280	1,647,746	1,604,353	3,343	8	37,368	48,175
21 September 2021	291	1,648,026	1,604,718	3,246	7	37,375	
22 September 2021	526	1,648,550	1,605,171	3,297	5	37,380	
23 September 2021	886	1,649,409	1,605,568	3,675	31	37,411	
24 September 2021	852	1,650,238	1,605,948	4,075	13	37,424	48,248
25 September 2021	783	1,650,985	1,606,490	4,237	9	37,433	
26 September 2021	775	1,651,750	1,606,961	4,486	8	37,441	
27 September 2021	640	1,652,364	1,607,496	4,526	5	37,446	48,266
28 September 2021	454	1,652,795	1,608,584	3,851	4	37,450	
29 September 2021	525	1,653,406	1,609,007	4,021	6	37,456	
30 September 2021	895	1,654,264	1,609,512	4,295	13	37,469	
1 October 2021	846	1,655,071	1,610,314	4,269	8	37,477	
2 October 2021	853	1,655,884	1,611,035	4,334	8	37,485	
3 October 2021	752	1,656,602	1,611,676	4,367	10	37,495	
4 October 2021	673	1,657,256	1,612,348	4,311	6	37,501	48,326
5 October 2021	503	1,657,749	1,613,029	4,110	6	37,507	
6 October 2021	714	1,658,444	1,613,524	4,293	6	37,513	
7 October 2021	981	1,659,386	1,614,090	4,607	21	37,534	
8 October 2021	1,037	1,660,372	1,614,917	4,725	9	37,543	
9 October 2021	1,033	1,661,370	1,615,629	4,968	12	37,555	
10 October 2021	1,105	1,662,433	1,616,329	5,290	10	37,565	
11 October 2021	996	1,663,383	1,617,035	5,496	7	37,572	48,405
12 October 2021	634	1,663,992	1,617,792	5,335	3	37,575	
13 October 2021	766	1,664,725	1,618,500	5,339	4	37,579	
14 October 2021	1,223	1,665,916	1,619,203	5,808	5	37,584	
15 October 2021	1,703	1,667,547	1,620,240	6,322	11	37,595	

== Charts ==
=== Deaths ===
PCR+ deaths count by age
Age	PCR+ deaths
≤ 39	1,053
40–49	1,594
50–59	4,158
60–69	7,684
70–79	10,251
80–89	9,257
≥ 90	3,597
Updated: 15 October 2021

=== Vaccination program ===
Types of vaccines used (percentage of the total doses applied)

== Distribution per region ==
=== Summary ===
- Confirmed cases and PCR+ deaths, updated as of 15 October 2021.
- All COVID-19 related deaths (including suspected deaths without PCR+), updated as of 11 October 2021.

Regions	Confirmed cases	Cases per 100,000	Confirmed PCR+ deaths	PCR+ deaths per 100,000	All COVID-19 deaths	All deaths per 100,000
Arica y Parinacota	27591	10944.03	535	212.21	662	262.58
Tarapacá	41910	10949.05	810	211.61	920	240.35
Antofagasta	61962	8955.94	1252	180.96	1520	219.70
Atacama	27567	8759.52	356	113.12	464	147.44
Coquimbo	49188	5883.06	1029	123.07	1299	155.36
Valparaíso	124400	6346.39	3477	177.38	4620	235.69
Santiago Metropolitan	699562	8609.92	19260	237.04	25017	307.90
O'Higgins	69238	6986.24	1556	157.00	2087	210.58
Maule	102532	9058.09	1784	157.61	2255	199.22
Ñuble	36287	7093.53	646	126.28	824	161.08
Biobío	152148	9145.18	2693	161.87	3334	200.40
Araucanía	98596	9720.18	1514	149.26	2054	202.50
Los Ríos	49543	12207.67	696	171.50	908	223.74
Los Lagos	89317	10019.41	1408	157.95	1738	194.97
Aysén	8401	7829.67	79	73.63	103	96.00
Magallanes and Chilean Antarctica	29256	16402.60	499	279.77	598	335.27
National total: 16 regions	1667547	8569.84	37594	193.20	48405	248.76

=== Charts ===
For these charts, the regions of Chile has been grouped as:

- North: Arica and Parinacota, Tarapacá, Antofagasta, Atacama and Coquimbo regions.
- Center: Valparaíso, O'Higgins, Maule and Ñuble regions.
- Metropolitan: Santiago Metropolitan Region.
- South: Biobío, Araucanía, Los Ríos and Los Lagos regions.
- Extreme South: Aysén and Magallanes and Chilean Antarctica regions.

== Distribution per commune ==
Cases per 100,000 inhabitants at commune level (left, by May 2020; right, by August 2020).
> 3,000 cases.
1,000–3,000
300–1,000.
100–300.
30–100.
10–30.
1–10.
None.
