= Statistics of the COVID-19 pandemic in Russia =

This article presents official statistics gathered during the COVID-19 pandemic in Russia.

== Progression charts ==
=== National ===
==== Cumulative number of cases, active cases, recoveries and deaths ====
View source data.

=== Daily cases ===
View source data.
View source data.

==== Confirmed deaths per day ====
View source data.

=== Regional ===
==== Total cases ====
Total cases by federal subject
View source data.
View source data.

Moscow Moscow Oblast Saint Petersburg Nizhny Novgorod Oblast Sverdlovsk Oblast
Khanty-Mansi AO Irkutsk Oblast Krasnoyarsk Krai Rostov Oblast Other regions

==== New daily cases ====
Daily new cases by federal subject

Moscow Moscow Oblast Saint Petersburg Nizhny Novgorod Oblast Sverdlovsk Oblast
Khanty-Mansi AO Irkutsk Oblast Krasnoyarsk Krai Rostov Oblast Other regions

== Maps ==
Confirmed or probable COVID-19 deaths per million by federal subjects in April–November 2020, according to Rosstat.
2,000–5,000
1,000–2,000
500–1,000
200–500
100–200
50–100
20–50

Confirmed cases per million by federal subjects
60,000+
30,000–60,000
20,000–30,000
10,000–20,000
6,000–10,000
3,000–6,000

Total confirmed cases by federal subjects
100,000+
10,000–99,999
1,000–9,999
100–999
