= Bibliography of the history of the COVID-19 pandemic =

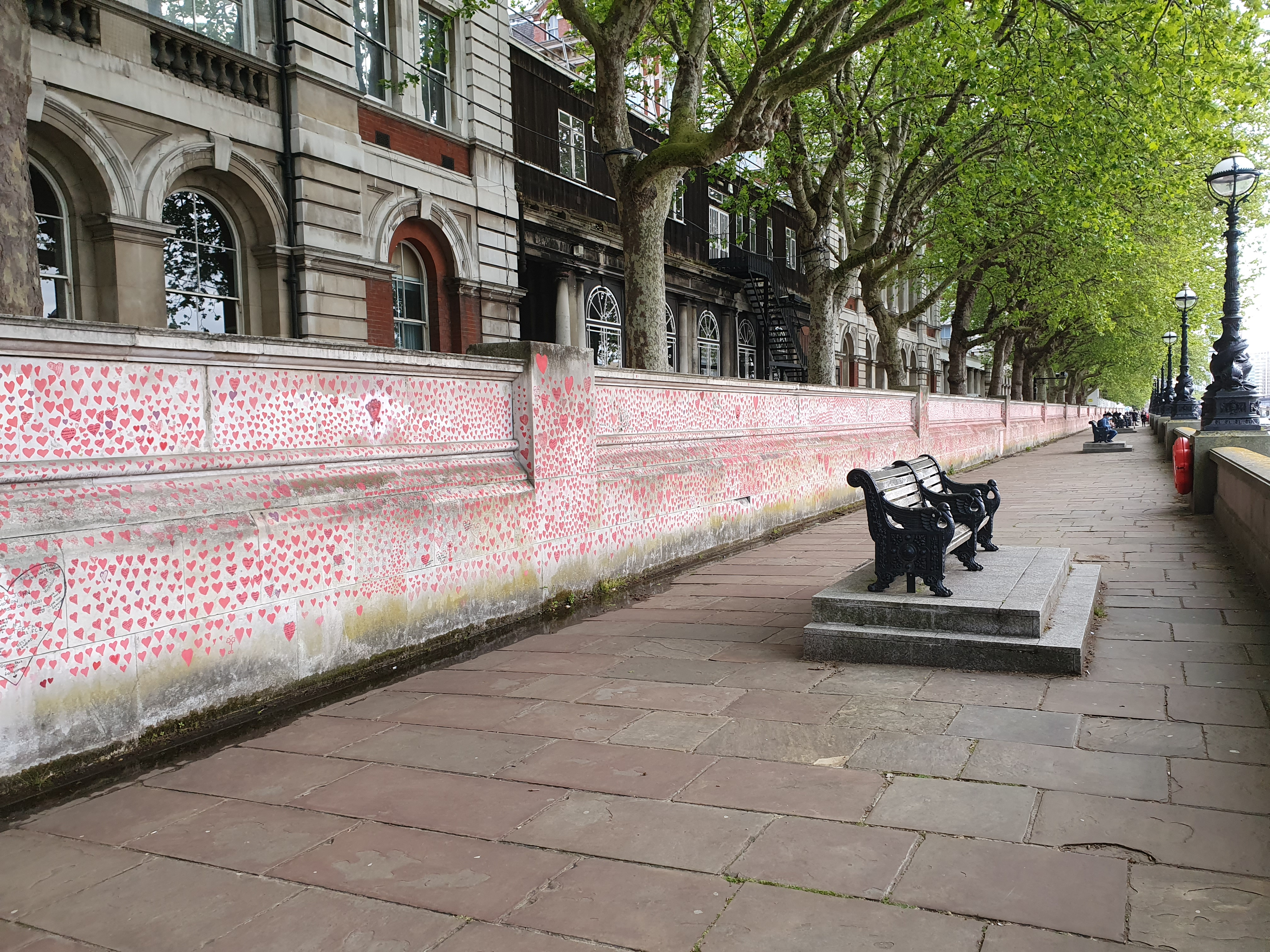
- The National Covid Memorial Wall in London
- Disease: Coronavirus disease 2019 (COVID-19)
- Pathogen: Severe acute respiratory syndrome coronavirus 2 (SARS‑CoV‑2)
- Source: Bats (indirectly)
- Location: Worldwide
- Index case: Wuhan, China; 30°37′11″N 114°15′28″E; 1 December 2019 (6 years, 10 months, 1 week and 4 days ago)
- Dates: Described as a pandemic by the WHO: 11 March 2020 (6 years and 7 months ago) Public health emergency of international concern: 30 January 2020 – 5 May 2023 (3 years, 3 months and 5 days)
- Confirmed cases: 779,277,425
- Suspected cases: Far higher (>70% of the world population, by the end of 2022)
- Deaths: 7,115,706 (reported); 18.5–35.2 million (estimated)
- Fatality rate: As of 10 March 2023: 1.02%

This is a bibliography of the history of the COVID-19 pandemic. This bibliography is limited to history and excludes other disciplines unless the work in question contains substantial historical material or value.

The global COVID-19 pandemic (also known as the coronavirus pandemic), caused by severe acute respiratory syndrome coronavirus 2 (SARS-CoV-2), began with an outbreak in Wuhan, China, in December 2019. It spread to other parts of Asia and then worldwide in early 2020. The World Health Organization (WHO) declared the outbreak a public health emergency of international concern (PHEIC) on 30 January 2020 and assessed it as having become a pandemic on 11 March. The WHO declared that the public health emergency caused by COVID-19 had ended in May 2023, while noting that COVID-19 continued to be a global health threat.

Bibliography contains academic level English language books (including translations) and journal articles, published mainly post World War II. (Note: Works published before World War II should be limited to areas where there is no significant post World War II books on the subject or when the work in question has significant historical merit.) Book entries may have references to reviews published in academic journals or major newspapers when these could be considered helpful. These reference reviews also function as a resource to find other works on this subject. Works listed here are cited in the notes or bibliographies of scholarly sources. Each is published by an academic or major press, written by a recognized expert, or substantially reviewed in scholarly journals; borderline cases are omitted. A selection of primary sources is included. Many of the books below carry their own bibliographies; see the Further reading section for other bibliographies, and the External links section for historical sites, academic sites, and museums.

Citations follow APA style. (Note: Entries are in plain text APA 7 format without templates; templates are used only for reviews and notes.) Books have citations to academic journal or mainstream published reviews when available. For books only partly about the subject, relevant chapter or section titles are provided when useful and available. Translators of the original-language edition are included when possible. In cases where a title or name has appeared with more than one English spelling, the most recent published form is used and a footnote documents any earlier title under which the work appeared.

== Global surveys ==
- Baldwin, P. (2021). Fighting the first wave: Why the coronavirus was tackled so differently across the globe. Cambridge University Press. doi:10.1017/9781009000222
- Bethke, F. S., & Wolff, J. (2023). Lockdown of expression: Civic space restrictions during the COVID-19 pandemic as a response to mass protests. Democratization, 30(6), 1073–1091. doi:10.1080/13510347.2023.2209021
- Claessens, M. (2021). The science and politics of Covid-19: How scientists should tackle global crises. Springer. doi:10.1007/978-3-030-77864-4
- Comstock, A. L., Heiss, A., & Chaudhry, S. (2025). Derogations, democratic backsliding, and international human rights during the COVID-19 pandemic. Journal of Human Rights, 24(1), 95–110. doi:10.1080/14754835.2024.2446854
- Drezner, D. W. (2020). The song remains the same: International relations after COVID-19. International Organization, 74(S1), E18–E35. doi:10.1017/S0020818320000351
- Edgell, A. B., Lachapelle, J., Lührmann, A., & Maerz, S. F. (2021). Pandemic backsliding: Violations of democratic standards during Covid-19. Social Science & Medicine, 285, 114244. doi:10.1016/j.socscimed.2021.114244
- Engler, S., Brunner, P., Loviat, R., Abou-Chadi, T., Leemann, L., Glaser, A., & Kübler, D. (2021). Democracy in times of the pandemic: Explaining the variation of COVID-19 policies across European democracies. West European Politics, 44(5–6), 1077–1102. doi:10.1080/01402382.2021.1900669
- Gidengil, E., Stolle, D., & Bergeron-Boutin, O. (2022). COVID-19 and support for executive aggrandizement. Canadian Journal of Political Science, 55(2), 342–372. doi:10.1017/s0008423922000117
- Ginsburg, T., & Versteeg, M. (2021). The bound executive: Emergency powers during the pandemic. International Journal of Constitutional Law, 19(5), 1498–1535. doi:10.1093/icon/moab059
- Giommoni, T., & Loumeau, G. (2022). Lockdown and voting behaviour: A natural experiment on postponed elections during the COVID-19 pandemic. Economic Policy, 37(111), 547–599. doi:10.1093/epolic/eiac018
- Greer, S. L., King, E. J., Massard da Fonseca, E., & Peralta-Santos, A. (Eds.). (2021). Coronavirus politics: The comparative politics and policy of COVID-19. University of Michigan Press. doi:10.3998/mpub.11927713
- Hale, T., Angrist, N., Goldszmidt, R., Kira, B., Petherick, A., Phillips, T., Webster, S., Cameron-Blake, E., Hallas, L., Majumdar, S., & Tatlow, H. (2021). A global panel database of pandemic policies (Oxford COVID-19 Government Response Tracker). Nature Human Behaviour, 5(4), 529–538. doi:10.1038/s41562-021-01079-8
- Horton, R. (2020). The COVID-19 catastrophe: What's gone wrong and how to stop it happening again. Polity.
- Johansson, B., Hopmann, D. N., & Shehata, A. (2021). When the rally-around-the-flag effect disappears, or: When the COVID-19 pandemic becomes "normalized". Journal of Elections, Public Opinion and Parties, 31(sup1), 321–334. doi:10.1080/17457289.2021.1924742
- Kavanagh, M. M., & Singh, R. (2020). Democracy, capacity, and coercion in pandemic response: COVID-19 in comparative political perspective. Journal of Health Politics, Policy and Law, 45(6), 997–1012. doi:10.1215/03616878-8641530
- Landman, T., & Smallman-Raynor, M. (2023). The politics of COVID-19: Government response in comparative perspective. Political Geography, 106, 102957. doi:10.1016/j.polgeo.2023.102957
- Lasco, G. (2020). Medical populism and the COVID-19 pandemic. Global Public Health, 15(10), 1417–1429. doi:10.1080/17441692.2020.1807581
- Lipscy, P. Y. (2020). COVID-19 and the politics of crisis. International Organization, 74(S1), E98–E127. doi:10.1017/S0020818320000375
- Morgan, P. (2022). China's COVID-19 vaccine supplies to the Global South: Between politics and business. Bristol University Press. doi:10.46692/9781529226348
- Petrov, J. (2020). The COVID-19 emergency in the age of executive aggrandizement: What role for legislative and judicial checks? The Theory and Practice of Legislation, 8(1–2), 71–92. doi:10.1080/20508840.2020.1788232
- Schraff, D. (2021). Political trust during the Covid-19 pandemic: Rally around the flag or lockdown effects? European Journal of Political Research, 60(4), 1007–1017. doi:10.1111/1475-6765.12425
- Tooze, A. (2021). Shutdown: How Covid shook the world's economy. Viking.

== The World Health Organization and the pandemic ==
- Aremu, S. O., Adamu, A. I., Obeta, O. K., Ibe, D. O., Mairiga, S. A., Otukoya, M. A., & Barkhadle, A. A. (2025). The United States withdrawal from the World Health Organization (WHO), its implications for global health governance. Globalization and Health, 21(1), 48. doi:10.1186/s12992-025-01137-0
- Benvenisti, E. (2020). The WHO—destined to fail?: Political cooperation and the COVID-19 pandemic. American Journal of International Law, 114(4), 588–597. doi:10.1017/ajil.2020.66
- Davies, S. E., & Wenham, C. (2020). Why the COVID-19 response needs International Relations. International Affairs, 96(5), 1227–1251. doi:10.1093/ia/iiaa135
- Davies, S. E., & Harman, S. (2026). WHO and COVID-19: Stress testing the boundary of science and politics. International Relations, 40(1), 53–73. doi:10.1177/00471178241248548
- de Bengy Puyvallée, A., & Storeng, K. T. (2022). COVAX, vaccine donations and the politics of global vaccine inequity. Globalization and Health, 18(1), 26. doi:10.1186/s12992-022-00801-z
- Stein, F. (2021). Risky business: COVAX and the financialization of global vaccine equity. Globalization and Health, 17(1), 112. doi:10.1186/s12992-021-00763-8
- Villarreal, P. A. (2021). The law of the WHO and COVID-19 pandemic reformism. German Yearbook of International Law, 64(1), 11–40. doi:10.3790/gyil.64.1.11
- Wilson, K., Halabi, S., & Gostin, L. O. (2020). The International Health Regulations (2005), the threat of populism and the COVID-19 pandemic. Globalization and Health, 16(1), 70. doi:10.1186/s12992-020-00600-4
- Yamey, G., & Titanji, B. K. (2025). Withdrawal of the United States from the WHO — how President Trump is weakening public health. New England Journal of Medicine, 392(15), 1457–1460. doi:10.1056/nejmp2501790
- Yang, H. (2022). Politicizing global governance institutions in times of crisis: The case of World Health Organization during the coronavirus pandemic. Global Governance: A Review of Multilateralism and International Organizations, 28(3), 405–431. doi:10.1163/19426720-02803004

== Regional ==
=== United States ===
- Abutaleb, Y., & Paletta, D. (2021). Nightmare scenario: Inside the Trump administration's response to the pandemic that changed history. HarperCollins.
- Birx, D. (2022). Silent invasion: The untold story of the Trump administration, Covid-19, and preventing the next pandemic before it's too late. Harper.
- Bridgman, A., Merkley, E., Loewen, P. J., Owen, T., Ruths, D., Teichmann, L., & Zhilin, O. (2020). The causes and consequences of COVID-19 misperceptions: Understanding the role of news and social media. Harvard Kennedy School Misinformation Review, 1(3). doi:10.37016/mr-2020-028
- Covid Crisis Group. (2023). Lessons from the Covid war: An investigative report. PublicAffairs.
- Fauci, A. S. (2024). On call: A doctor's journey in public service. Viking.
- Gadarian, S. K., Goodman, S. W., & Pepinsky, T. B. (2022). Pandemic politics: The deadly toll of partisanship in the age of COVID. Princeton University Press. doi:10.1515/9780691219004
- Grossman, G., Kim, S., Rexer, J. M., & Thirumurthy, H. (2020). Political partisanship influences behavioral responses to governors' recommendations for COVID-19 prevention in the United States. Proceedings of the National Academy of Sciences, 117(39), 24144–24153. doi:10.1073/pnas.2007835117
- Hatcher, W. (2020). A failure of political communication not a failure of bureaucracy: The danger of presidential misinformation during the COVID-19 pandemic. The American Review of Public Administration, 50(6–7), 614–620. doi:10.1177/0275074020941734
- Kamenetz, A. (2022). The stolen year: How COVID changed children's lives, and where we go now. PublicAffairs.
- Klinenberg, E. (2024). 2020: One city, seven people, and the year everything changed. Alfred A. Knopf.
- Macedo, S., & Lee, F. (2025). In Covid's wake: How our politics failed us. Princeton University Press. doi:10.1515/9780691267159
- McSwane, J. D. (2022). Pandemic, Inc.: Chasing the capitalists and thieves who got rich while we got sick. Atria/One Signal Publishers.
- Nocera, J., & McLean, B. (2023). The big fail: What the pandemic revealed about who America protects and who it leaves behind. Portfolio.
- Perry, S. L., Whitehead, A. L., & Grubbs, J. B. (2020). Culture wars and COVID-19 conduct: Christian nationalism, religiosity, and Americans' behavior during the coronavirus pandemic. Journal for the Scientific Study of Religion, 59(3), 405–416. doi:10.1111/jssr.12677
- Slavitt, A. (2021). Preventable: The inside story of how leadership failures, politics, and selfishness doomed the U.S. coronavirus response. St. Martin's Press.
- Witt, J. F. (2020). American contagions: Epidemics and the law from smallpox to COVID-19. Yale University Press. doi:10.12987/9780300257779
- Wright, L. (2021). The plague year: America in the time of Covid. Alfred A. Knopf.

==== The MAGA movement ====
- Allcott, H., Boxell, L., Conway, J., Gentzkow, M., Thaler, M., & Yang, D. (2020). Polarization and public health: Partisan differences in social distancing during the coronavirus pandemic. Journal of Public Economics, 191, 104254. doi:10.1016/j.jpubeco.2020.104254
- Bratich, J. (2021). 'Give me liberty or give me Covid!': Anti-lockdown protests as necropopulist downsurgency. Cultural Studies, 35(2–3), 257–265. doi:10.1080/09502386.2021.1898016
- Cooper, P., & Lampropoulou, S. (2024). China virus, kung flu, and MAGA: Countervalues and sociological fractionation on Twitter as evidenced by pro- and anti-Trump discourses in relation to Covid-19. Discourse, Context & Media, 57, 100758. doi:10.1016/j.dcm.2024.100758
- Fischer, F. (2022). Post-truth populism and scientific expertise: Climate and Covid policies from Trump to Biden. International Review of Public Policy, 4(1), 115–122. doi:10.4000/irpp.2390
- Gollwitzer, A., Martel, C., Brady, W. J., Pärnamets, P., Freedman, I. G., Knowles, E. D., & Van Bavel, J. J. (2020). Partisan differences in physical distancing are linked to health outcomes during the COVID-19 pandemic. Nature Human Behaviour, 4(11), 1186–1197. doi:10.1038/s41562-020-00977-7
- Hart, P. S., Chinn, S., & Soroka, S. (2020). Politicization and polarization in COVID-19 news coverage. Science Communication, 42(5), 679–697. doi:10.1177/1075547020950735
- Jacobson, G. C. (2020). Donald Trump and the parties: Impeachment, pandemic, protest, and electoral politics in 2020. Presidential Studies Quarterly, 50(4), 762–795. doi:10.1111/psq.12682
- Koo, G. H., Johnson, T. J., Lee, T., & Jia, C. (2024). Politically contested beliefs: Support for Trump better predicts having inaccurate beliefs about COVID-19 than conservative/Republican political identity. Mass Communication and Society, 27(4), 792–819. doi:10.1080/15205436.2022.2144380
- McGuire, J. W. (2024). The Trump vote and Covid-19 vaccination across US states, US counties, and Connecticut towns. Regional & Federal Studies, 34(4), 545–573. doi:10.1080/13597566.2023.2168268
- Morris, D. S. (2021). Polarization, partisanship, and pandemic: The relationship between county-level support for Donald Trump and the spread of Covid-19 during the spring and summer of 2020. Social Science Quarterly, 102(5), 2412–2431. doi:10.1111/ssqu.13053
- Motta, M., Stecula, D., & Farhart, C. (2020). How right-leaning media coverage of COVID-19 facilitated the spread of misinformation in the early stages of the pandemic in the U.S. Canadian Journal of Political Science, 53(2), 335–342. doi:10.1017/s0008423920000396
- Motta, M., & Stecula, D. (2023). The effects of partisan media in the face of global pandemic: How news shaped COVID-19 vaccine hesitancy. Political Communication, 40(5), 505–526. doi:10.1080/10584609.2023.2187496
- Rutledge, P. E. (2020). Trump, COVID-19, and the war on expertise. The American Review of Public Administration, 50(6–7), 505–511. doi:10.1177/0275074020941683
- Stecula, D. A., & Pickup, M. (2021). How populism and conservative media fuel conspiracy beliefs about COVID-19 and what it means for COVID-19 behaviors. Research & Politics, 8(1), 2053168021993979. doi:10.1177/2053168021993979
- Wallace, J., Goldsmith-Pinkham, P., & Schwartz, J. L. (2023). Excess death rates for Republican and Democratic registered voters in Florida and Ohio during the COVID-19 pandemic. JAMA Internal Medicine, 183(9), 916. doi:10.1001/jamainternmed.2023.1154
- Zhang, Y., Chen, F., & Lukito, J. (2023). Network amplification of politicized information and misinformation about COVID-19 by conservative media and partisan influencers on Twitter. Political Communication, 40(1), 24–47. doi:10.1080/10584609.2022.2113844

=== East Asia ===
==== China ====
- Fang, F. (2020). Wuhan diary: Dispatches from a quarantined city (M. Berry, Trans.). HarperVia. (Original work published 2020)
- Mei, C. (2020). Policy style, consistency and the effectiveness of the policy mix in China's fight against COVID-19. Policy and Society, 39(3), 309–325. doi:10.1080/14494035.2020.1787627
- Yang, G. (2022). The Wuhan lockdown. Columbia University Press. doi:10.7312/yang20046

==== Japan ====
- Akimoto, D. (2024). Japan and global health: Human security agenda in the COVID-19 pandemic. Springer Nature Singapore. doi:10.1007/978-981-97-0972-4
- Borovoy, A. (2022). The burdens of self-restraint: Social measures and the containment of Covid-19 in Japan. Asia-Pacific Journal, 20(16), e2. doi:10.1017/s1557466022019465
- Demelius, Y., & Szczepanska, K. (2024). Conspiracy theories and the COVID-19 pandemic in Japan: The rise, radicalization, and fall (?) of YamatoQ-kai. Social Science Japan Journal, 27(2), 149–168. doi:10.1093/ssjj/jyae003
- Hata, M. (2024). Self-restraint behavior and partisanship during the COVID-19 pandemic: Evidence from a list experiment in Japan. Social Science Japan Journal, 27(2), 221–229. doi:10.1093/ssjj/jyae002
- Ito-Morales, K. (2022). Individual rights vs. common good? A case study on Japanese self-restraint (jishuku) and COVID-19. Asian Studies, 10(1), 69–95. doi:10.4312/as.2022.10.1.69-95
- Kato, T. (2021). Opposition in Japan to the Olympics during the COVID-19 pandemic. Humanities and Social Sciences Communications, 8(1), 327. doi:10.1057/s41599-021-01011-5
- Okamoto, K., & Zenkyo, M. (2024). Partisanship and attribution of responsibility during the COVID-19 pandemic in Japan. Social Science Japan Journal, 27(2), 231–239. doi:10.1093/ssjj/jyae023
- Wright, J. (2021). Overcoming political distrust: The role of 'self-restraint' in Japan's public health response to COVID-19. Japan Forum, 33(4), 453–475. doi:10.1080/09555803.2021.1986565

==== Southeast Asia ====
- Aguilar, F. V., Jr. (2020). Preparedness, agility, and the Philippine response to the Covid-19 pandemic: The early phase in comparative Southeast Asian perspective. Philippine Studies: Historical and Ethnographic Viewpoints, 68(3). doi:10.13185/2244-1638.1056
- Harriss, J., & Luong, H. V. (2022). Covid-19 in Asia: Governance and the politics of the pandemic. Pacific Affairs, 95(4), 685–706. doi:10.5509/2022954685
- Loh, K. S., & Hsu, L. Y. (2023). Pandemics in Singapore, 1819–2022: Lessons for the age of COVID-19. Routledge. doi:10.4324/9781003384014
- Schäfer, S., & Syam, M. (2025). Pandemic politics: The acceleration of democratic erosion and autocratization in Indonesia during Covid-19. Zeitschrift für Vergleichende Politikwissenschaft, 18(4), 475–503. doi:10.1007/s12286-025-00634-1

=== South Asia and the Middle East ===
==== India ====
- Arnold, D. (2022). Pandemic India: From cholera to Covid-19. Oxford University Press. doi:10.1093/oso/9780197659625.001.0001
- Chatterji, T., Götz, G., Harrison, P., Moore, R., & Roy, S. (2024). Capacity in motion: Comparative COVID-19 governance in India and South Africa. Territory, Politics, Governance, 12(10), 1601–1621. doi:10.1080/21622671.2022.2154829
- Roy, R. (2024). Politics through precarity: Tech workers' unions in India during the Covid-19 pandemic. Journal of Contemporary Asia, 54(1), 110–132. doi:10.1080/00472336.2022.2110925
- Roy, S. D. (2024). Pandemic fissures: COVID-19, dehumanisation, and the obsolescence of freedom in India. Routledge India. doi:10.4324/9781003505167
- Shahare, V. B. (2021). COVID-19 lockdown: The neglected migrant workers in India. Asia Pacific Journal of Social Work and Development, 31(1–2), 97–104. doi:10.1080/02185385.2021.1875335
- Sriraman, T. (2022). Affective activism and digital archiving: Relief work and migrant workers during the Covid-19 lockdown in India. PoLAR: Political and Legal Anthropology Review, 45(2), 224–239. doi:10.1111/plar.12501

==== Middle East ====
- Ben Brik, A. (Ed.). (2022). The COVID-19 pandemic in the Middle East and North Africa: Public policy responses. Routledge. doi:10.4324/9781003266259
- Dolatabadi, A. B., & Kamrava, M. (2021). The Covid-19 pandemic and Iranian health diplomacy. Middle East Policy, 28(3–4), 55–71. doi:10.1111/mepo.12592
- Koehler, K., & Schulhofer-Wohl, J. (2021). Governing the Covid-19 pandemic in the Middle East and North Africa: Containment measures as a public good. Middle East Law and Governance, 14(1), 5–25. doi:10.1163/18763375-13040003

=== United Kingdom ===
- Calvert, J., & Arbuthnott, G. (2021). Failures of state: The inside story of Britain's battle with coronavirus. Mudlark.

=== Europe ===
- Bull, M. (2021). The Italian government response to Covid-19 and the making of a prime minister. Contemporary Italian Politics, 13(2), 149–165. doi:10.1080/23248823.2021.1914453
- Farrar, J., & Ahuja, A. (2021). Spike: The virus vs. the people – the inside story. Profile Books.
- Krastev, I. (2020). Is it tomorrow yet? Paradoxes of the pandemic. Allen Lane.
- Ladi, S., & Tsarouhas, D. (2020). EU economic governance and Covid-19: Policy learning and windows of opportunity. Journal of European Integration, 42(8), 1041–1056. doi:10.1080/07036337.2020.1852231
- Pierre, J. (2020). Nudges against pandemics: Sweden's COVID-19 containment strategy in perspective. Policy and Society, 39(3), 478–493. doi:10.1080/14494035.2020.1783787
- Sridhar, D. (2022). Preventable: How a pandemic changed the world & how to stop the next one. Viking.

==== Russia ====
- Grishin, N. (2022). Electoral reform during the COVID-19 pandemic: Empirical evidence from Russia. Russian Politics, 7(4), 535–554. doi:10.30965/24518921-00604030

=== Africa ===
- Ben Brik, A. (Ed.). (2022). The COVID-19 pandemic in the Middle East and North Africa: Public policy responses. Routledge. doi:10.4324/9781003266259
- Botes, T., Ngqula, Z., Rampeta, B., Baloyi, T., & Penda, C. (2024). Continuity and discontinuity of rituals: Covid-19 pandemic in Southern Africa. Anthropology Southern Africa, 47(1), 59–72. doi:10.1080/23323256.2023.2263060
- Durojaye, E., & Powell, D. M. (Eds.). (2022). Constitutional resilience and the COVID-19 pandemic: Perspectives from Sub-Saharan Africa. Springer. doi:10.1007/978-3-031-06401-2
- Muyambo, T., Sande, N., & Tendere, J. (2022). 'Wash and pray': The nexus of African Christianity and science in the context of COVID-19 in Zimbabwe. Journal of Religion in Africa, 52(3–4), 348–373. doi:10.1163/15700666-12340234
- Reed, A., & Xaso, Z. (2022). Policing the (post)colonial body: The Covid-19 lockdown in South Africa. Anthropology Southern Africa, 45(2), 92–104. doi:10.1080/23323256.2022.2101498
- Sibanda, F., Muyambo, T., & Chitando, E. (Eds.). (2022). Religion and the COVID-19 pandemic in Southern Africa. Routledge. doi:10.4324/9781003241096

=== Latin America ===
- Blofield, M. (2021). Introduction to thematic issue on COVID-19 and politics in Latin America. Journal of Politics in Latin America, 13(3), 287–289. doi:10.1177/1866802x211063824
- Crowder-Taraborrelli, T., Scott, A., & Wilson, K. M. (2023). COVID-19 coronavirus: Pandemic politics in Latin America. Latin American Perspectives, 50(4), 4–17. doi:10.1177/0094582x231195866
- Cyr, J., Bianchi, M., González, L., & Perini, A. (2021). Governing a pandemic: Assessing the role of collaboration on Latin American responses to the COVID-19 crisis. Journal of Politics in Latin America, 13(3), 290–327. doi:10.1177/1866802x211049250
- de la Cerda, N., Hartlyn, J., & Martinez-Gallardo, C. (2024). Ideological and populist bases of partisan responses to the COVID-19 pandemic in Latin America. Journal of Politics in Latin America, 16(2), 252–271. doi:10.1177/1866802x241262326
- Donoso, S., Puga, I., Moya, C., & Gerber, M. M. (2022). Is it worth the risk? Grievances and street protest participation during the COVID-19 pandemic in Chile. Journal of Politics in Latin America, 14(3), 338–362. doi:10.1177/1866802x221127712
- Farias, D. B. L., Casarões, G., & Magalhães, D. (2022). Radical right populism and the politics of cruelty: The case of COVID-19 in Brazil under President Bolsonaro. Global Studies Quarterly, 2(2), ksab048. doi:10.1093/isagsq/ksab048
- Moura de Oliveira, G., & Verissimo Veronese, M. (2023). Brazil and the "Bolsonaro phenomenon": Politics, the economy, and the COVID-19 pandemic, 2019–2020. Latin American Perspectives, 50(5), 12–28. doi:10.1177/0094582x221147597
- Ortega, F., & Orsini, M. (2020). Governing COVID-19 without government in Brazil: Ignorance, neoliberal authoritarianism, and the collapse of public health leadership. Global Public Health, 15(9), 1257–1277. doi:10.1080/17441692.2020.1795223
- Pignataro, A. (2021). Sources of government approval during the COVID-19 pandemic: Threat or electoral predispositions? Journal of Politics in Latin America, 13(3), 400–418. doi:10.1177/1866802x211059184
- Ricard, J., & Medeiros, J. (2020). Using misinformation as a political weapon: COVID-19 and Bolsonaro in Brazil. Harvard Kennedy School Misinformation Review, 1(3). doi:10.37016/mr-2020-013

=== Other ===
- Bromfield, N., & McConnell, A. (2021). Two routes to precarious success: Australia, New Zealand, COVID-19 and the politics of crisis governance. International Review of Administrative Sciences, 87(3), 518–535. doi:10.1177/0020852320972465
- Broschek, J. (2022). Federalism, political leadership and the Covid-19 pandemic: Explaining Canada's tale of two federations. Territory, Politics, Governance, 10(6), 779–798. doi:10.1080/21622671.2022.2101513

== Culture, religion, and society ==
- Agamben, G. (2021). Where are we now? The epidemic as politics (V. Dani, Trans.). ERIS. (Original work published 2020)
- Bambra, C., Lynch, J., & Smith, K. E. (2021). The unequal pandemic: COVID-19 and health inequalities. Policy Press. doi:10.51952/9781447361251
- Benjamin, R. (2022). Viral justice: How we grow the world we want. Princeton University Press. doi:10.1515/9780691222899
- Bratton, B. (2021). The revenge of the real: Politics for a post-pandemic world. Verso.
- Butler, J. (2022). What world is this? A pandemic phenomenology. Columbia University Press. doi:10.7312/butl20828
- Christakis, N. A. (2020). Apollo's arrow: The profound and enduring impact of coronavirus on the way we live. Little, Brown Spark.
- Collins, C., Landivar, L. C., Ruppanner, L., & Scarborough, W. J. (2021). COVID-19 and the gender gap in work hours. Gender, Work & Organization, 28(S1), 101–112. doi:10.1111/gwao.12506
- Davis, M. (2020). The monster enters: COVID-19, avian flu and the plagues of capitalism. OR Books. JSTOR j.ctv15nbzws
- Delanty, G. (Ed.). (2021). Pandemics, politics, and society: Critical perspectives on the Covid-19 crisis. De Gruyter. doi:10.1515/9783110713350
- Douglas, K. M. (2021). COVID-19 conspiracy theories. Group Processes & Intergroup Relations, 24(2), 270–275. doi:10.1177/1368430220982068
- Gover, A. R., Harper, S. B., & Langton, L. (2020). Anti-Asian hate crime during the COVID-19 pandemic: Exploring the reproduction of inequality. American Journal of Criminal Justice, 45(4), 647–667. doi:10.1007/s12103-020-09545-1
- Keidl, P. D., Melamed, L., Hediger, V., & Somaini, A. (Eds.). (2020). Pandemic media: Preliminary notes toward an inventory. meson press. doi:10.14619/0085
- Laster Pirtle, W. N. (2020). Racial capitalism: A fundamental cause of novel coronavirus (COVID-19) pandemic inequities in the United States. Health Education & Behavior, 47(4), 504–508. doi:10.1177/1090198120922942
- Latour, B. (2021). After lockdown: A metamorphosis (J. Rose, Trans.). Polity. (Original work published 2021)
- Lupton, D., & Willis, K. (Eds.). (2021). The COVID-19 crisis: Social perspectives. Routledge. doi:10.4324/9781003111344
- Lupton, D. (2022). COVID societies: Theorising the coronavirus crisis. Routledge. doi:10.4324/9781003200512
- Manderson, L., Burke, N. J., & Wahlberg, A. (Eds.). (2021). Viral loads: Anthropologies of urgency in the time of COVID-19. UCL Press. doi:10.14324/111.9781800080232
- Rodziewicz, M. (2021). Religion in the first year of the pandemic: Shi'i jurisprudence on Covid-19 in the Islamic Republic of Iran. The Middle East Journal, 75(4), 551–573. doi:10.3751/75.4.13
- Roy, A. (2020). Azadi: Freedom. Fascism. Fiction. Haymarket Books.
- Sitrin, M., & Colectiva Sembrar (Eds.). (2020). Pandemic solidarity: Mutual aid during the Covid-19 crisis. Pluto Press. JSTOR j.ctv12sdx5v
- Sugrue, T. J., & Zaloom, C. (Eds.). (2022). The long year: A 2020 reader. Columbia University Press. doi:10.7312/sugr20452
- Žižek, S. (2020). Pandemic! COVID-19 shakes the world. OR Books. JSTOR j.ctv16t6n4q

=== Funerals and mourning ===
- Al-Dawoody, A. (2021). Necessity and Islamic juristic creativity: The case of the management of the dead related to COVID-19. Human Remains and Violence, 7(1), 72–91. doi:10.7227/hrv.7.1.6
- Basu, L. (2023). South Asian COVID-19 memoirs: Mourning and erasure of "grievable lives". Humanities, 12(4), 62. doi:10.3390/h12040062
- Bibi, R. (2025). Grief interrupted-exploring British Muslim communities practices of burial and commemoration during Covid 19. Sage Open, 15(3), 21582440251357413. doi:10.1177/21582440251357413
- Chan, H. Y. (2022). Death, burials and funerals: Grieving in the shadow of Covid-19. Amicus Curiae, 3(2), 251–277. doi:10.14296/ac.v3i2.5412
- Cooper, L. (2021). Kaddish during COVID: Mourning rituals during a pandemic. Contemporary Jewry, 41(1), 39–69. doi:10.1007/s12397-021-09395-x
- Cruz-Santiago, A., & Schwartz-Marin, E. (2021). Biorecuperation, the epidemic of violence and COVID-19 in Mexico. Human Remains and Violence, 7(2), 64–84. doi:10.7227/hrv.7.2.5
- Denyer Willis, G., Stepputat, F., & Clavandier, G. (2021). Special issue introduction: Burial and the politics of dead bodies in times of COVID-19: Exception and rupture? Human Remains and Violence, 7(2), 4–18. doi:10.7227/hrv.7.2.2
- Dodd, A., & Guerin, S. (2026). Exploring funeral directors' experience and perceived impact of providing funeral services during COVID-19 restrictions. OMEGA – Journal of Death and Dying, 93(3), 1969–1986. doi:10.1177/00302228241272608
- Enari, D. (2023). COVID-19 funerals: Minorities and the digital space. Journal of New Zealand & Pacific Studies, 11(1), 57–61. doi:10.1386/nzps_00141_7
- Jarnkvist, K. (2025). Articulations of 'funeral' in Swedish newspapers during the Covid-19 pandemic. OMEGA – Journal of Death and Dying, 92(1), 25–43. doi:10.1177/00302228231174601
- Lowe, J., Rumbold, B., & Aoun, S. M. (2020). Memorialisation during COVID-19: Implications for the bereaved, service providers and policy makers. Palliative Care and Social Practice, 14, 2632352420980456. doi:10.1177/2632352420980456
- MacNeil, A., Findlay, B., Bimman, R., Hocking, T., Barclay, T., & Ho, J. (2023). Exploring the use of virtual funerals during the COVID-19 pandemic: A scoping review. OMEGA – Journal of Death and Dying, 88(2), 425–448. doi:10.1177/00302228211045288
- Manamperi, L. B. (2023). A critical human rights perspective on the Sri Lankan government's forced cremation policy of COVID-19 deceased in the context of religious majoritarianism. International Journal for Religious Freedom, 16(1), 105–116. doi:10.59484/ieni1643
- Marsoof, A. (2021). The disposal of COVID-19 dead bodies: Impact of Sri Lanka's response on fundamental rights. Journal of Human Rights Practice, 13(3), 669–689. doi:10.1093/jhuman/huab030
- Maviza, G., & Thebe, P. (2025). Virtual eulogies, rituals, and burials: Experiences of and adaptations to death and mourning during the COVID-19 pandemic among transnational families. Illness, Crisis & Loss, 33(2), 322–341. doi:10.1177/10541373231219761
- Nunez Carrasco, L., Lewins, K. R., & Cooper, S. (2025). Excess of death and the experiential disruption of death and mourning rituals during the COVID-19 pandemic in South Africa. Medical Humanities, 51(4), 474–483. doi:10.1136/medhum-2024-013206
- O'Donoghue, D. (2022). Last place: Burying the dead in times of pandemic. Human Remains and Violence, 8(2), 74–93. doi:10.7227/hrv.8.2.6
- Pentaris, P. (Ed.). (2021). Death, grief and loss in the context of COVID-19. Routledge. doi:10.4324/9781003125990
- Purnell, K. (2025). Politicising space, (in)visibilising grief: Pandemic commemoration and the UK's "National COVID Memorial Wall". Environment and Planning C: Politics and Space, 43(2), 307–325. doi:10.1177/23996544241269226
- Raudon, S. (2022). Huddled masses: The shock of Hart Island, New York. Human Remains and Violence, 8(1), 84–101. doi:10.7227/hrv.8.1.6
- Reineke, R. C. (2022). Natural deaths in extraordinary times: Governing COVID dead in southern Arizona. Human Remains and Violence, 8(1), 67–83. doi:10.7227/hrv.8.1.5
- Riley, J., Entwistle, V., Arnason, A., Locock, L., Maccagno, P., Pattenden, A., & Crozier, R. (2024). Hybrid funerals: How online attendance facilitates and impedes participation. Mortality, 29(3), 593–611. doi:10.1080/13576275.2023.2201421
- Sanjurjo, L., Azevedo, D., & Nadai, L. (2021). Suspect bodies: Pandemic and management of dead bodies in Brazil. Human Remains and Violence, 7(2), 85–105. doi:10.7227/hrv.7.2.6
- Schuerhoff, C. (2023). Pandemic funerals in Norway: Hartmut Rosa's resonance as a sensitizing concept. Approaching Religion, 13(1), 38–53. doi:10.30664/ar.121524
- Silva, A. V. da. (2024). New technologies in Pentecostal funeral rituals during the COVID-19 pandemic in Brazil. Anthropological Quarterly, 97(3), 511–537. doi:10.1353/anq.2024.a936107
- Vähäkangas, A. (2023). Deathscapes in Finnish funerals during Covid-19. Approaching Religion, 13(1), 21–37. doi:10.30664/ar.121528
- van Schaik, T., & Wojtkowiak, J. (2023). Disembodied ritual: An explorative study on the meanings of physical absence during funerals by bereaved in times of COVID-19. Death Studies, 47(7), 873–880. doi:10.1080/07481187.2022.2135047
- Vave, R. (2021). Urban-rural compliance variability to COVID-19 restrictions of Indigenous Fijian (iTaukei) funerals in Fiji. Asia Pacific Journal of Public Health, 33(6–7), 767–774. doi:10.1177/10105395211005921

=== Burial and cremation practices ===
- Beltrán-Gil, I., Lopez-Cerquera, M. A., Reyes Muñoz, L. G., Sedano Rios, S. I., Maestro Martínez, N. M., & Franco, D. N. (2022). Forensic treatment and human identification in the age of COVID-19: Difficulties and challenges for the forensic medical system in Mexico. Human Remains and Violence, 8(1), 47–66. doi:10.7227/hrv.8.1.4
- Byers, C., & Montgomery, J. (2022). Rethinking New York's "dark shadow": Managing the unclaimed dead on Hart Island, 1869 to the present day. Architecture_MPS, 23(1). doi:10.14324/111.444.amps.2022v23i1.001
- Clavandier, G., Berthod, M.-A., Charrier, P., Julier-Costes, M., & Pagnamenta, V. (2021). From one body to another: The handling of the deceased during the COVID-19 pandemic, a case study in France and Switzerland. Human Remains and Violence, 7(2), 41–63. doi:10.7227/hrv.7.2.4
- Kumari, S. (2023). Understanding of stigmatization and death amid COVID-19 in India: A sociological exploration. OMEGA – Journal of Death and Dying, 86(4), 1432–1448. doi:10.1177/00302228211008753
- Rial, C. (2022). 'I can't return to the village without my baby': 'Evil deaths' and the difficulty of mourning in Brazil in the time of COVID-19. Human Remains and Violence, 8(1), 23–46. doi:10.7227/hrv.8.1.3

=== Mask controversy ===
- Adolph, C., Amano, K., Bang-Jensen, B., Fullman, N., Magistro, B., Reinke, G., & Wilkerson, J. (2022). Governor partisanship explains the adoption of statewide mask mandates in response to COVID-19. State Politics & Policy Quarterly, 22(1), 24–49. doi:10.1017/spq.2021.22
- Cassino, D., & Besen-Cassino, Y. (2020). Of masks and men? Gender, sex, and protective measures during COVID-19. Politics & Gender, 16(4), 1052–1062. doi:10.1017/s1743923x20000616
- Grunawalt, J. (2021). The villain unmasked: COVID-19 and the necropolitics of the anti-mask movement. Disability Studies Quarterly, 41(3). doi:10.18061/dsq.v41i3.8343
- Kahane, L. H. (2021). Politicizing the mask: Political, economic and demographic factors affecting mask wearing behavior in the USA. Eastern Economic Journal, 47(2), 163–183. doi:10.1057/s41302-020-00186-0
- Lang, J., Erickson, W. W., & Jing-Schmidt, Z. (2021). #MaskOn! #MaskOff! Digital polarization of mask-wearing in the United States during COVID-19. PLOS ONE, 16(4), e0250817. doi:10.1371/journal.pone.0250817
- Leone, M. (2023). The semiotics of the anti-COVID-19 mask. Social Semiotics, 33(2), 395–401. doi:10.1080/10350330.2020.1868943
- Lupton, D., Southerton, C., Clark, M., & Watson, A. (2021). The face mask in COVID times: A sociomaterial analysis. De Gruyter. doi:10.1515/9783110723717
- Palmer, C. L., & Peterson, R. D. (2020). Toxic mask-ulinity: The link between masculine toughness and affective reactions to mask wearing in the COVID-19 era. Politics & Gender, 16(4), 1044–1051. doi:10.1017/s1743923x20000422
- Rains, S. A., Harber, P., Warner, E. L., & Leroy, G. (2022). Public responses to COVID-19 mask mandates: Examining pro and anti-mask anger in tweets before and after state-level mandates. Communication Monographs, 89(4), 539–557. doi:10.1080/03637751.2022.2043555
- Scoville, C., McCumber, A., Amironesei, R., & Jeon, J. (2022). Mask refusal backlash: The politicization of face masks in the American public sphere during the early stages of the COVID-19 pandemic. Socius: Sociological Research for a Dynamic World, 8, 23780231221093158. doi:10.1177/23780231221093158
- Strasser, B. J., & Schlich, T. (2020). A history of the medical mask and the rise of throwaway culture. The Lancet, 396(10243), 19–20. doi:10.1016/s0140-6736(20)31207-1
- Tateo, L. (2021). Face masks as layers of meaning in times of COVID-19. Culture & Psychology, 27(1), 131–151. doi:10.1177/1354067x20957549
- Timpka, T., & Nyce, J. M. (2021). Face mask use during the COVID-19 pandemic—The significance of culture and the symbolic meaning of behavior. Annals of Epidemiology, 59, 1–4. doi:10.1016/j.annepidem.2021.03.012
- Verma, R. (2020). China's 'mask diplomacy' to change the COVID-19 narrative in Europe. Asia Europe Journal, 18(2), 205–209. doi:10.1007/s10308-020-00576-1
- Young, D. G., Rasheed, H., Bleakley, A., & Langbaum, J. B. (2022). The politics of mask-wearing: Political preferences, reactance, and conflict aversion during COVID. Social Science & Medicine, 298, 114836. doi:10.1016/j.socscimed.2022.114836

=== Misinformation and conspiracy theories ===
- Abutaleb, Y., & Paletta, D. (2021). Nightmare scenario: Inside the Trump administration's response to the pandemic that changed history. Harper.
- Ball, J. (2023). The other pandemic: How QAnon contaminated the world. Bloomsbury.
- Beres, D., Remski, M., & Walker, J. (2023). Conspirituality: How New Age conspiracy theories became a health threat. PublicAffairs.
- Berlivet, L., & Löwy, I. (2020). Hydroxychloroquine controversies: Clinical trials, epistemology, and the democratization of science. Medical Anthropology Quarterly, 34(4), 525–541. doi:10.1111/maq.12622
- Birchall, C., & Knight, P. (2022). Conspiracy theories in the time of Covid-19. Routledge. doi:10.4324/9781003315438
- Butter, M., & Knight, P. (Eds.). (2023). Covid conspiracy theories in global perspective. Routledge. doi:10.4324/9781003330769
- Chan, A., & Ridley, M. (2021). Viral: The search for the origin of COVID-19. HarperCollins.
- Colgrove, J., & Samuel, S. J. (2022). Freedom, rights, and vaccine refusal: The history of an idea. American Journal of Public Health, 112(2), 234–241. doi:10.2105/ajph.2021.306504
- DiResta, R. (2024). Invisible rulers: The people who turn lies into reality. PublicAffairs.
- Farrar, J., & Ahuja, A. (2021). Spike: The virus vs. the people – the inside story. Profile Books.
- Honigsbaum, M. (2020). The pandemic century: A history of global contagion from the Spanish flu to Covid-19. WH Allen.
- Hotez, P. J. (2023). The deadly rise of anti-science: A scientist's warning. Johns Hopkins University Press.
- Klein, N. (2023). Doppelganger: A trip into the mirror world. Farrar, Straus and Giroux.
- Lossio, J. (2023). Panic, denial, and the search for "magic remedies": The various social responses to covid-19 in Peru. História, Ciências, Saúde-Manguinhos, 30(Suppl. 1), e2023031. doi:10.1590/s0104-59702023000100031
- Quammen, D. (2022). Breathless: The scientific race to defeat a deadly virus. Simon & Schuster.
- Ragas, J., & Palma, P. (2022). Covid-19, the Chinese diaspora, and the enduring legacy of racism in Peru. História, Ciências, Saúde-Manguinhos, 29(2), 381–398. doi:10.1590/s0104-59702022000200005
- Rothschild, M. (2021). The storm is upon us: How QAnon became a movement, cult, and conspiracy theory of everything. Melville House.
- Sloan, S. M. (2020). Behind the "curve": COVID-19, infodemic, and oral history. The Oral History Review, 47(2), 193–202. doi:10.1080/00940798.2020.1798256
- Sommer, W. (2023). Trust the plan: The rise of QAnon and the conspiracy that unhinged America. Harper.
- Stelter, B. (2020). Hoax: Donald Trump, Fox News, and the dangerous distortion of truth. One Signal/Atria.
- Wright, L. (2021). The plague year: America in the time of Covid. Alfred A. Knopf.

== Race ==
- Chakraborty, C., Chen, S., Li, M., Man, G., & Yang, X. A. (Eds.). (2026). Anti-Asian racism and the COVID-19 pandemic in Canada. UBC Press.
- Chen, H. A., Trinh, J., & Yang, G. P. (2020). Anti-Asian sentiment in the United States – COVID-19 and history. The American Journal of Surgery, 220(3), 556–557. doi:10.1016/j.amjsurg.2020.05.020
- Chowkwanyun, M., & Reed, A. L., Jr. (2020). Racial health disparities and Covid-19—Caution and context. New England Journal of Medicine, 383(3), 201–203. doi:10.1056/nejmp2012910
- Gravlee, C. C. (2020). Systemic racism, chronic health inequities, and COVID-19: A syndemic in the making? American Journal of Human Biology, 32(5), Article e23482. doi:10.1002/ajhb.23482
- Yancy, C. W. (2020). COVID-19 and African Americans. JAMA, 323(19), 1891. doi:10.1001/jama.2020.6548

== Miscellaneous ==
- Honigsbaum, M. (2020). The pandemic century: A history of global contagion from the Spanish flu to Covid-19. WH Allen.
- Kenny, C. (2021). The plague cycle: The unending war between humanity and infectious disease. Scribner.

== Historiography ==
- Beiner, G. (Ed.). (2021). Pandemic re-awakenings: The forgotten and unforgotten "Spanish" flu of 1918–1919. Oxford University Press. doi:10.1093/oso/9780192843739.001.0001
- Brown, T. M. (2021). The COVID-19 pandemic in historical perspective: An AJPH dossier. American Journal of Public Health, 111(3), 402–404. doi:10.2105/ajph.2020.306136
- Charters, E., & McKay, R. A. (2020). The history of science and medicine in the context of COVID-19. Centaurus, 62(2), 223–233. doi:10.1111/1600-0498.12311
- Charters, E., & Heitman, K. (2021). How epidemics end. Centaurus, 63(1), 210–224. doi:10.1111/1600-0498.12370
- Clarke, N., & Barnett, C. (2023). Archiving the COVID-19 pandemic in Mass Observation and Middletown. History of the Human Sciences, 36(2), 3–25. doi:10.1177/09526951231152139
- Colbrook, S. (2023). Writing the history of pandemics in the age of COVID-19. Journal of American Studies, 57(1), 112–119. doi:10.1017/s0021875822000226
- Forbes, A. W. (2021). Covid-19 in historical context: Creating a practical past. HEC Forum, 33(1–2), 7–18. doi:10.1007/s10730-021-09443-x
- Foster, A. L., & Goedde, P. (2021). Introduction: U.S. foreign relations historians writing their way out of COVID-19. Diplomatic History, 45(3), 445–450. doi:10.1093/dh/dhab018
- Frankema, E., & Tworek, H. (2020). Pandemics that changed the world: Historical reflections on COVID-19. Journal of Global History, 15(3), 333–335. doi:10.1017/s1740022820000339
- Fridman, O., & Gensburger, S. (Eds.). (2024). The COVID-19 pandemic and memory: Remembrance, commemoration, and archiving in crisis. Palgrave Macmillan. doi:10.1007/978-3-031-34597-5
- Hobbins, P. (2020). Collecting the crisis or the collecting crisis? A survey of Covid-19 archives. History Australia, 17(3), 565–567. doi:10.1080/14490854.2020.1796510
- Hobbins, P. (2023). Viral historicity: Overcollecting the COVID-19 pandemic. Health and History, 25(1), 82–91. doi:10.1353/hah.2023.a904713
- Honigsbaum, M. (2023). The "Spanish" flu and the pandemic imaginary. Isis, 114(S1), S143–S161. doi:10.1086/726984
- Jones, D. S. (2020a). COVID-19, history, and humility. Centaurus, 62(2), 370–380. doi:10.1111/1600-0498.12296
- Jones, D. S. (2020b). History in a crisis — lessons for Covid-19. New England Journal of Medicine, 382(18), 1681–1683. doi:10.1056/NEJMp2004361
- Kanazawa, R. (2023). Pandemic responses and the strengths of health systems: A review of global AIDS historiography in light of COVID-19. Isis, 114(S1), S162–S205. doi:10.1086/726985
- Laurenson, S., Robertson, C., & Goggins, S. (2020). Collecting COVID-19 at National Museums Scotland. Museum and Society, 18(3), 334–336. doi:10.29311/mas.v18i3.3519
- Lovell, K. (Ed.). (2023). RecordCovid19: Historicizing experiences of the pandemic. De Gruyter. doi:10.1515/9783110731002
- Peinado, M. (2021, March 11). Referencing a pandemic: A bibliography of historians' responses to COVID-19. Perspectives on History.
- Snell, K. D. M. (2022). Parishes, pandemics and paths to take: Post-Covid-19 historical options. Family & Community History, 25(1), 3–19. doi:10.1080/14631180.2022.2095734
- Varlık, N. (2020). Rethinking the history of plague in the time of COVID-19. Centaurus, 62(2), 285–293. doi:10.1111/1600-0498.12302
- Vermeir, K. (2020). Editorial: Doing history in the time of COVID-19. Centaurus, 62(2), 219–222. doi:10.1111/1600-0498.12319
- Zuanni, C. (2022). Contemporary collecting in a pandemic: Challenges and solutions for documenting the COVID-19 pandemic in memory organizations. Heritage, 5(4), 3616–3627. doi:10.3390/heritage5040188

== Memory studies ==
- Beiner, G. (Ed.). (2021). Pandemic re-awakenings: The forgotten and unforgotten 'Spanish' flu of 1918–1919. Oxford University Press. doi:10.1093/oso/9780192843739.001.0001
- Bikmen, N., & Le, T. (2026). Who wants to remember COVID-19? Social identification and collective remembering-imagining system predict support for pandemic commemorations. Memory, 34(5), 495–505. doi:10.1080/09658211.2026.2639554
- Bristow, N. K. (2012). American pandemic: The lost worlds of the 1918 influenza epidemic. Oxford University Press.
- Craps, S., & Gilbert, C. (2021). Memory dynamics in times of crisis: An interview with Sarah Gensburger. Memory Studies, 14(6), 1388–1400. doi:10.1177/17506980211054345
- Erll, A. (2020). Afterword: Memory worlds in times of Corona. Memory Studies, 13(5), 861–874. doi:10.1177/1750698020943014
- Fridman, O., & Gensburger, S. (Eds.). (2023). The COVID-19 pandemic and memory: Remembrance, commemoration, and archiving in crisis. Palgrave Macmillan. doi:10.1007/978-3-031-34597-5
- Kattago, S. (2021). Ghostly pasts and postponed futures: The disorder of time during the corona pandemic. Memory Studies, 14(6), 1401–1413. doi:10.1177/17506980211054015
- Outka, E. (2020). Viral modernism: The influenza pandemic and interwar literature. Columbia University Press. doi:10.7312/outk18574
- Parui, A., & Raj, M. S. (2021). The COVID-19 crisis chronotope: The pandemic as matter, metaphor and memory. Memory Studies, 14(6), 1431–1444. doi:10.1177/17506980211054346
- Purnell, K. (2024). Politicising space, (in)visibilising grief: Pandemic commemoration and the UK's "National COVID Memorial Wall". Environment and Planning C: Politics and Space, 43(2), 307–325. doi:10.1177/23996544241269226
- Qian, L. (2021). Making memory work: The SARS memory and China's war on COVID-19. Memory Studies, 14(6), 1489–1502. doi:10.1177/17506980211054358
- Santikarma, A., & Wagner, S. (2024). De-exceptionalizing pandemic death in the United States: COVID-19's ambiguous and layered mourning. Anthropological Quarterly, 97(3), 557–578. doi:10.1353/anq.2024.a936104
- Tollerton, D. (2026). Remembering and forgetting Britain's COVID-19 pandemic. Routledge. doi:10.4324/9781003479925
- Vinitzky-Seroussi, V., & Maraschin, M. J. (2021). Between remembrance and knowledge: The Spanish flu, COVID-19, and the two poles of collective memory. Memory Studies, 14(6), 1475–1488. doi:10.1177/17506980211054357
- Zaretsky, N. (2023). Near and far: Tracing memory and reframing presence in pandemic-era Argentina. Memory Studies, 16(3), 576–592. doi:10.1177/17506980231162325
- Zuanni, C. (2022). Contemporary collecting in a pandemic: Challenges and solutions for documenting the COVID-19 pandemic in memory organizations. Heritage, 5(4), 3616–3627. doi:10.3390/heritage5040188

== See also ==
- COVID-19
- COVID-19 lockdowns
- COVID-19 misinformation
- COVID-19 pandemic
- Economic impact of the COVID-19 pandemic
- Impact of the COVID-19 pandemic
- Memorials for the COVID-19 pandemic
- National responses to the COVID-19 pandemic
- Outline of the COVID-19 pandemic
- Political impact of the COVID-19 pandemic
- Protests against responses to the COVID-19 pandemic
- Social impact of the COVID-19 pandemic
- Timeline of the COVID-19 pandemic

== Medical journals ==
- COVID-19 pandemic (2019–20) Collection by Public Library of Science (PLOS)
- COVID-19 Portfolio;, a curated collection of publications and preprints by National Institutes of Health (NIH)
- Coronavirus Disease 2019 (COVID-19) by JAMA: The Journal of the American Medical Association
- COVID-19: Novel Coronavirus Outbreak; by Wiley Publishing
- Coronavirus (COVID-19) Hub by BMJ Publishing Group
- Novel Coronavirus Information Center by Elsevier
- Coronavirus (COVID-19) by The New England Journal of Medicine
- COVID-19 Research Highlights by Springer Nature
- COVID-19 Resource Centre by The Lancet
