= John P. O'Neill =

American counterterrorism expert (1952–2001)

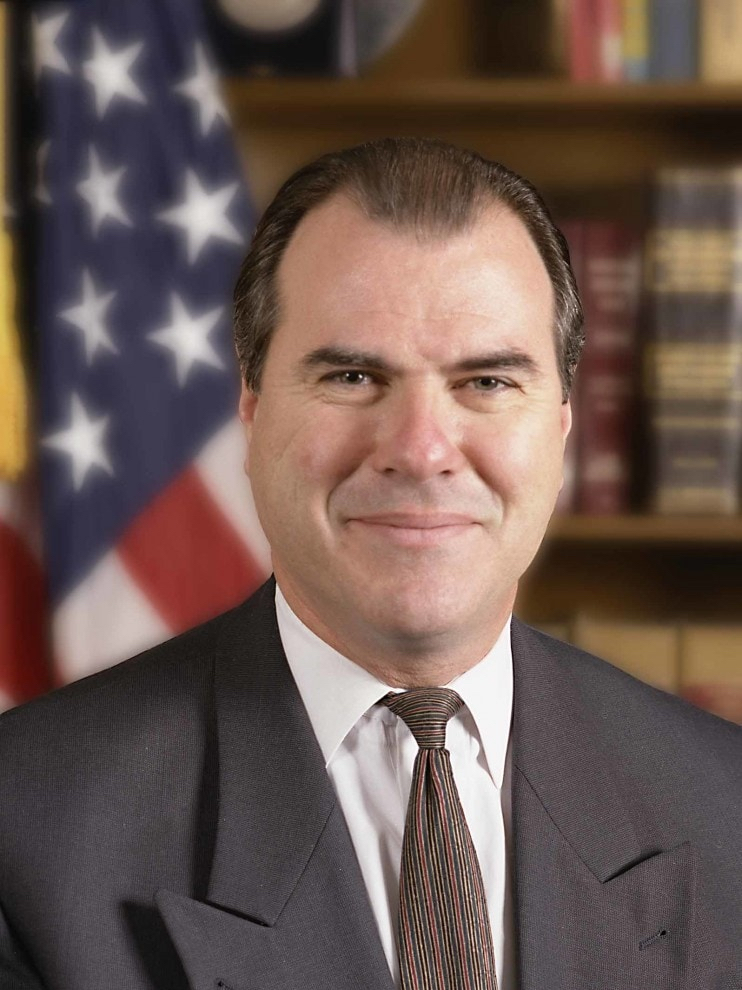
- Born: John Patrick O'Neill; February 6, 1952; Atlantic City, New Jersey, U.S.
- Died: September 11, 2001 (aged 49); South Tower, World Trade Center, New York City, U.S.
- Cause of death: Collapse of 2 World Trade Center during the September 11 attacks
- Education: American University (B.A.); George Washington University (M.S.)
- Occupations: FBI special agent; World Trade Center security head

John Patrick O'Neill (February 6, 1952 – September 11, 2001) was an American counter-terrorism expert who worked as a special agent and eventually a special agent in charge in the Federal Bureau of Investigation. In 1995, O'Neill began to intensely study the roots of the 1993 World Trade Center bombing after he assisted in the capture of Ramzi Yousef, who was the leader of that plot.

He subsequently learned of al-Qaeda and Osama bin Laden, and investigated the 1996 Khobar Towers bombing in Saudi Arabia and the 2000 USS Cole bombing in Yemen. Partly due to personal friction he had within the FBI and federal government, O'Neill left the Bureau in August 2001. He became the head of security at the World Trade Center, where he died at age 49 while helping others to evacuate the South Tower during the September 11 attacks. O'Neill's life has been featured in a number of documentaries and books.

== Early life ==
O'Neill was born in Atlantic City, New Jersey, on February 6, 1952. As a child, his favorite television show was The F.B.I., a crime drama based around true cases the bureau had handled. In 1971, after graduating from Holy Spirit High School, he enrolled at American University in Washington, D.C. While there, O'Neill also started working at the FBI's Washington headquarters, first as a fingerprint clerk and later as a tour guide. He graduated with a degree in administration of justice from American University in 1974 and later obtained a master's degree in forensics from George Washington University.

== Career ==
=== 1976–1995 ===
The FBI hired O'Neill as an agent in 1976. Over the next 15 years, he worked on issues such as white-collar crime, organized crime, and foreign counterintelligence while based at the Washington bureau. In 1991, he received an important promotion and was moved to the FBI's Chicago field office, where he was Assistant Special Agent in Charge. While there, he established the Fugitive Task Force in an effort to promote inter-agency cooperation and enhance ties between the FBI and local law enforcement. In 1994, O'Neill also became supervisor of VAPCON, a task force investigating abortion clinic bombings.

=== 1995–1999 ===
In 1995, he returned to the FBI's Washington, D.C., headquarters and became chief of the counter-terrorism section. On his first day, he received a call from his friend Richard Clarke, who had just learned that Ramzi Yousef had been located in Pakistan. O'Neill worked continuously over the next few days to gather information and coordinate the successful capture and extradition of Yousef. Intrigued by the case, O'Neill continued to study the 1993 World Trade Center bombing that Yousef had masterminded and other information about Islamic militants. He was directly involved in the investigation into the June 1996 bombing of the Khobar Towers in Saudi Arabia, which took place during a retreat O'Neill had organized in Quantico for FBI and CIA counter-terrorism agents. Frustrated by the level of cooperation from the Saudis, O'Neill purportedly vented to FBI Director Louis Freeh, saying they were "blowing smoke up your ass," although Freeh later denied this, claiming they had an excellent relationship.

In 1996 and 1997, O'Neill continued to warn of growing threats of terrorism, saying that modern groups are not supported by governments and that there are terrorist cells operating within the United States. He stated that veterans of the insurgency by Afghan rebels against the Soviet Union's invasion in the 1980s had become a major threat. In January 1997, he moved to New York City to be Special Agent in Charge of the FBI's National Security Division, the FBI's "largest and most prestigious field office."

By 1998, O'Neill had become focused on Osama bin Laden and created an al-Qaeda desk in his division. In August 1998, two United States embassies were bombed in quick succession in simultaneous attacks in Nairobi, Kenya, and Dar es Salaam, Tanzania. O'Neill hoped to be involved in the investigation because he had gained a tremendous knowledge of Osama bin Laden's al-Qaeda terrorist network. He persuaded FBI Director Freeh to let his office handle the case, and prosecutor Mary Jo White later said, "John O'Neill, in the investigation of the bombings of our embassies in East Africa, created the template for successful investigations of international terrorism around the world."

When his friend Chris Isham, a producer for ABC News, arranged for an interview between bin Laden and correspondent John Miller, Isham and Miller used information put together by O'Neill to formulate the questions. After the interview aired, O'Neill pushed Isham hard to release an unedited version so he could carefully dissect it.

O'Neill's rise through the ranks at the bureau began to slow as his personal style chafed others, and he made a few slip-ups by losing a bureau cell phone and PalmPilot, improperly borrowing a car from a safe house, and losing track of a briefcase with sensitive documents for a short period.

He was a Catholic, married with two children, but separated from his wife; his family continued to live in Atlantic City, and he supported them financially and paid the mortgage on their house. According to Lawrence Wright in The Looming Tower, O'Neill was involved simultaneously in extramarital relationships with three named women during the 1990s, each of whom he had told either that he was not married or that he was divorced, and that he planned to marry her.

He was officially reprimanded and docked 15 days' pay in summer 1999 over the incident involving the safe house because he had allowed his girlfriend to enter it. His lifestyle, which involved frequently giving gifts to his girlfriends and lavish expenditures with his colleagues, resulted in substantial credit card debts which he found difficult to manage on his salary, and consequently, he borrowed substantial sums from wealthy friends.

In 1999, O'Neill sent a close associate named Mark Rossini to work in the CIA's Bin Laden Issue Station in Virginia. O'Neill had a conflict with CIA station chief Michael Scheuer: O'Neill wanted Rossini to stay at the station and feed him information about what the CIA was doing, while Rich Blee, who had been appointed by CIA chief George Tenet to head of the Bin Laden Issue Station, wanted Rossini out working in the field. Later, when the Bin Laden Issue Station learned that bin Laden's associates Nawaf al-Hazmi and Khalid al-Mihdhar were headed to the US with visas, Rossini and his colleague Doug Miller attempted to alert O'Neill, but CIA agent Alfreda Bikowsky allegedly blocked the message. Mihdhar and Hazmi became two of the hijackers of American Airlines Flight 77 on 9/11.

Following the December 1999 arrest of Ahmed Ressam, O'Neill coordinated the investigation into the 2000 millennium attack plots, described by Richard Clarke as "the most comprehensive investigation ever conducted before September 11th." O'Neill has been described as having a close working relationship with Ali Soufan.

=== 2000 ===
After being passed over for multiple promotions (to assistant director in charge of national security in 1999 and to head of the FBI's New York office in early 2000), O'Neill was pleased to be assigned as commander of the FBI's investigation into the USS Cole bombing in October 2000. However, upon arriving in Yemen, he complained about inadequate security. As his team investigated, O'Neill came into conflict with Barbara Bodine, the U.S. ambassador to Yemen. The two had widely divergent views on how to handle searches of Yemeni property, and interviews with citizens and government officials, and they only grew further apart as time progressed.

After two months in Yemen, O'Neill returned to New York. He hoped to go back to Yemen to continue the investigation, but was blocked by Bodine and others; the dispute made the US press. Following threats against the remaining FBI investigators, FBI Director Freeh withdrew the team, on O'Neill's recommendation, in June 2001.

=== Retirement ===
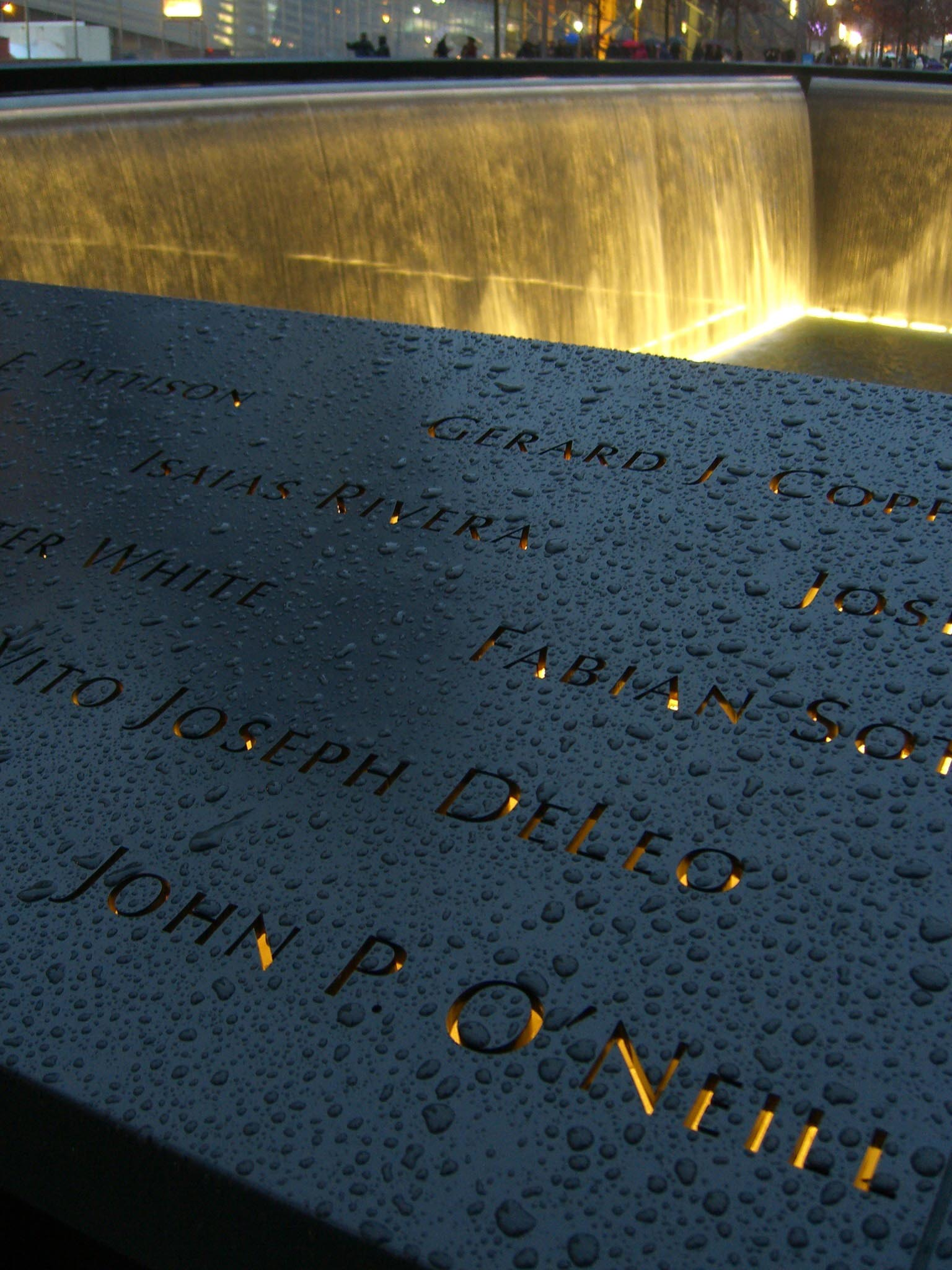
O'Neill's name is located on Panel N-63 of the National September 11 Memorial's North Pool.

In early 2001, Richard A. Clarke, the National Coordinator for Security, Infrastructure Protection, and Counter-terrorism wanted to move to another position; he insisted O'Neill was the best person to replace him. O'Neill proved reluctant, not least because of the relatively low salary. When O'Neill heard of upcoming leaks to The New York Times about the May 2000 incident in which his briefcase had been stolen, he decided to retire from the bureau and take a higher-paying job in the private sector, as chief of security at the World Trade Center.

An August 19, 2001, The New York Times report by James Risen and David Johnston suggested that O'Neill had been the subject of an "internal investigation" at the FBI because O'Neill was responsible for losing a briefcase with "highly classified information" in it, including among other things "a description of every counterespionage and counterterrorism program in New York." The briefcase was recovered shortly after its disappearance.

The FBI investigation was reported to have concluded that the briefcase had been snatched by local thieves involved in a series of hotel burglaries and that none of the documents inside had been removed or even touched. Several people came to O'Neill's defense, suggesting that he was the subject of a "smear campaign". One of O'Neill's associates later claimed that O'Neill believed the source for the Times story was FBI official Thomas J. Pickard. The Times reported that O'Neill was expected to retire in late August.

O'Neill started his new job at the World Trade Center on August 23, 2001. In late August, he talked to his friend Chris Isham about the job. Jokingly, Isham said, "At least they're not going to bomb it again", a reference to the 1993 World Trade Center bombing. O'Neill replied, "They'll probably try to finish the job."

== Death ==
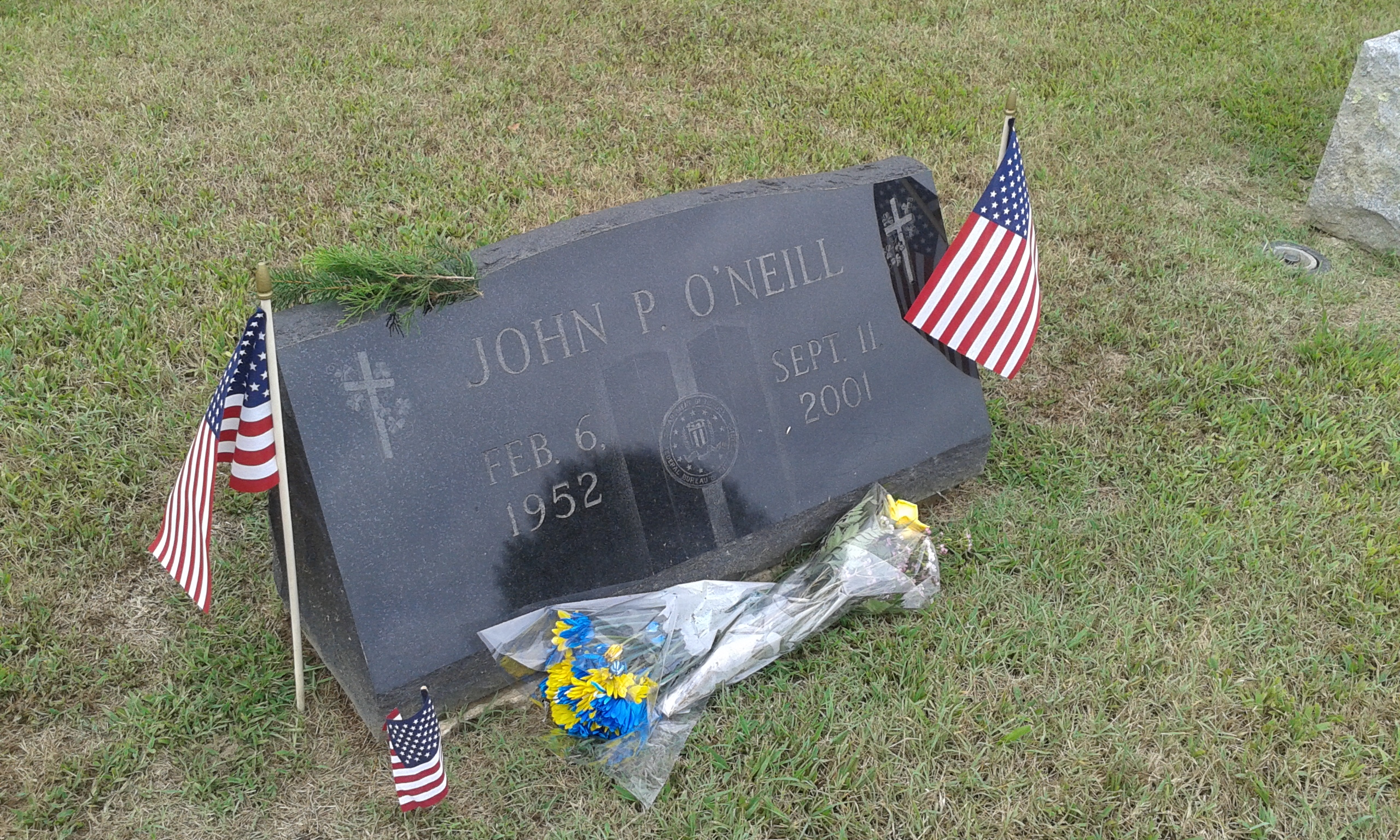
O'Neill's gravestone at Holy Cross Cemetery, Mays Landing, New Jersey

O'Neill was in his office on the 34th floor of the South Tower when the North Tower was struck. O'Neill evacuated and headed to the lobby of the North Tower, where he was captured on film by Jules Naudet. Wesley Wong, an FBI agent who had known O'Neill for more than twenty years, and was in the command center with O'Neill that had been set up following the North Tower crash, last saw O'Neill walking toward a tunnel leading to the South Tower, likely to assist in that building's evacuation and gather surveillance footage from the security offices located there. O'Neill was killed in the collapse of the South Tower; his body was recovered from debris near Liberty Street on September 21.

O'Neill is buried in Holy Cross Cemetery in Mays Landing, New Jersey. At the National September 11 Memorial, O'Neill is memorialized at the North Pool, on Panel N-63.

== Media ==
O'Neill's counter-terrorism work at the FBI as well as insights into his character and private life have been extensively detailed in books and documentaries about the lead-up to the September 11 attacks, including the following:

=== Books ===
- "Terrorist Hunter's Final Mission". America's Heroes: Inspiring Stories of Courage, Sacrifice and Patriotism. Bannon, Peter L. 2001. p. 60–61.
- Weiss, Murray (2003). The Man Who Warned America.
- Wright, Lawrence (2006). The Looming Tower.
- Soufan, Ali (2011). The Black Banners.

=== Television ===
- The Man Who Knew (2002), a Frontline documentary about O'Neill
- The Path to 9/11 (2006), a two-part ABC television miniseries whose protagonist, O'Neill, is portrayed by Harvey Keitel
- The Looming Tower (2018), Hulu's 10-episode television miniseries adaptation of Wright's eponymous 2006 book, in which O'Neill is portrayed by Jeff Daniels

== See also ==
- Rick Rescorla, a Vietnam War veteran and Morgan Stanley's WTC head of security who died in the attacks on 9/11
