= The Looming Tower =

2006 book by Lawrence Wright

The Looming Tower: Al-Qaeda and the Road to 9/11
- Cover of the first US edition
- Author: Lawrence Wright
- Cover artist: Chip Kidd (designer)
- Language: English
- Genre: Nonfiction
- Publisher: Alfred A. Knopf (US)
- Publication date: 2006
- Publication place: United States
- Media type: Print (Hardcover)
- Pages: 480
- ISBN: 978-0-375-41486-2
- OCLC: 64592193
- Dewey Decimal: 973.931 22
- LC Class: HV6432.7 .W75 2006

The Looming Tower: Al-Qaeda and the Road to 9/11 is a 2006 nonfiction book by Lawrence Wright. Wright examines the origins of the militant organization Al-Qaeda, the background for various terrorist attacks and how they were investigated, and the events that led to the September 11 attacks.

The book was a New York Times best-seller and won a number of awards, including the Pulitzer Prize for General Nonfiction. A ten-episode television miniseries adaptation aired in 2018 on Hulu.

== Overview ==
The Looming Tower is largely focused on the people who conspired to commit the September 11 attacks, their motives and personalities, and how they interacted. The book starts with Sayyid Qutb, an Egyptian religious scholar who visited the United States in the late 1940s and returned to his home to become an anti-West Islamist and eventually a martyr for his beliefs. There is also a portrait of Ayman al-Zawahiri—from his childhood in Egypt, to his participation in and later leadership of Egyptian Islamic Jihad, to his merging of his organization with Al Qaeda.

Osama bin Laden is the person described the most, from his childhood in Saudi Arabia in a rich family to his participation in the jihad against the Soviet Union in Afghanistan, his role as a financier of terrorist groups, his stay in Sudan, his return to Afghanistan, and his interactions with the Taliban. The 1998 United States embassy bombings in Dar es Salaam, Tanzania, and Nairobi, Kenya are described, as is the bombing of the USS Cole in 2000.

Lawrence Wright also describes in detail some of the Americans involved in counter-terrorism, in particular Richard A. Clarke, chief counter-terrorism adviser on the U.S. National Security Council; Michael Scheuer, head of the CIA's counterterrorist Alec Station; and John P. O'Neill, an assistant deputy director of investigation for the FBI, who served as America's top bin Laden hunter until his retirement from the FBI in August 2001, after which he worked as head of security at the World Trade Center, where he died in the 9/11 attacks.

The book also describes some of the problems associated with the lack of cooperation between the FBI, the CIA, and other U.S. government organizations that prevented them from uncovering the 9/11 plot in time.

Because The Looming Tower is to a large extent focused on telling the story of the people involved, it does not describe the 9/11 plot and its execution in much detail. It focuses more on the background and the conditions that produced the people who planned and staged the attack and on information about those who were combating terror against the United States.

== Awards and honors ==
- 2006 Los Angeles Times Book Prize
- 2006 New York Times Best Seller
- 2006 New York Times Notable Book of the Year
- 2006 New York Times Best Books of the Year
- 2006 IRE Award
- 2006 National Book Award finalist
- 2006 Time magazine's Best Books of the Year
- 2007 Pulitzer Prize for General Nonfiction
- 2007 Helen Bernstein Book Award for Excellence in Journalism
- 2007 J. Anthony Lukas Book Prize
- 2007 Lionel Gelber Prize
- 2007 Arthur Ross Book Award shortlist
- 2007 PEN Center USA Literary Award (Research Nonfiction)
- 2009 Newsweek 50 Books for Our Times
- 2024 #55, New York Times 100 Best Books of the 21st Century

== Television adaptation ==
A ten-episode television miniseries based on the book began airing on Hulu February 28, 2018. The cast includes Alec Baldwin as CIA director George Tenet, Jeff Daniels as John O’Neill, Tahar Rahim as Ali Soufan, and Peter Sarsgaard as the fictional CIA analyst Martin Schmidt, based on Michael Scheuer.
