= Cleo (play) =

Theatrical play

Cleo is a 21st-century theatrical play by Lawrence Wright based on the filming of the 1963 movie "Cleopatra" during which Elizabeth Taylor and Richard Burton participated. The play focuses on their relationship.

It has been represented by English actor Richard Short as Burton portraying Mark Anthony, and by Lisa Birnbaum as Taylor portraying Cleopatra.

Cleo premiered in April 2018 at the Alley Theatre in Houston, Texas, and was directed by Bob Balaban.
