= The Plague Year =

2021 book by Lawrence Wright

The Plague Year: America in the Time of COVID
- Author: Lawrence Wright
- Language: English
- Subject: COVID-19 pandemic in the United States
- Genre: non-fiction
- Published: 2021
- Publisher: Alfred A. Knopf
- Publication place: United States
- Media type: Hardcover
- Pages: 336
- ISBN: 978-0-593-320723

The Plague Year: America in the Time of COVID is a 2021 nonfiction book by American journalist Lawrence Wright.

== Background ==
The book is written by Pulitzer Prize-winning author and New Yorker staff writer Lawrence Wright. Based on a long-form article in the magazine, which took up most of the January 4, 2021, print issue, the book guides readers through the tragic year of 2020 that America spent fighting against the COVID-19 pandemes.

== Reception ==
Writing for the Israel Journal of Foreign Affairs, William M. Simons writes, "[the book] is not immune to omission and digression. Caveats aside, Wright narrates a tragic, riveting, and instructive tale of an America that at the onset of the pandemic led the world in wealth, science, medicine, and preparedness, yet, when tested, endured more pain, disruption, and death than any other nation."

Carlos Lozada, the non-fiction book critic of The Washington Post writes, "Wright provides memorable historical context — during the flu pandemic a century ago, an Anti-Mask League emerged in San Francisco, proving there is really nothing new in the world — and even literary references, reminding readers that Boccaccio's “Decameron" featured 10 friends sheltering in place in plague-era Florence. But he also holds up some heroes for our time."

The Guardian's Andrew Anthony writes, "But this is not a book of heroes, apart perhaps from Barney Graham, the chief architect of both the Moderna and Pfizer vaccines. Instead, it's a story about hubris and division, complacency and insularity, but most of all precariousness."
