= Spike: The Virus Vs. The People - the Inside Story =

- First edition
- Author: Jeremy Farrar, Anjana Ahuja
- Language: English
- Genre: Non-fiction
- Publisher: Profile Books
- Publication place: United Kingdom

Spike: The Virus Vs. The People - the Inside Story is a 2021 book by British medical researcher Jeremy Farrar and British Indian science journalist Anjana Ahuja. The book gives Farrar's account of the COVID-19 pandemic, his view of government policy as a member of Britain's Scientific Advisory Group for Emergencies, and his fears about the virus's origins.
