= Outline of the COVID-19 pandemic =

Pandemic caused by SARS-CoV-2 (2019–2023)

The COVID-19 pandemic is a global pandemic caused by the COVID-19 virus.

== Statistics ==
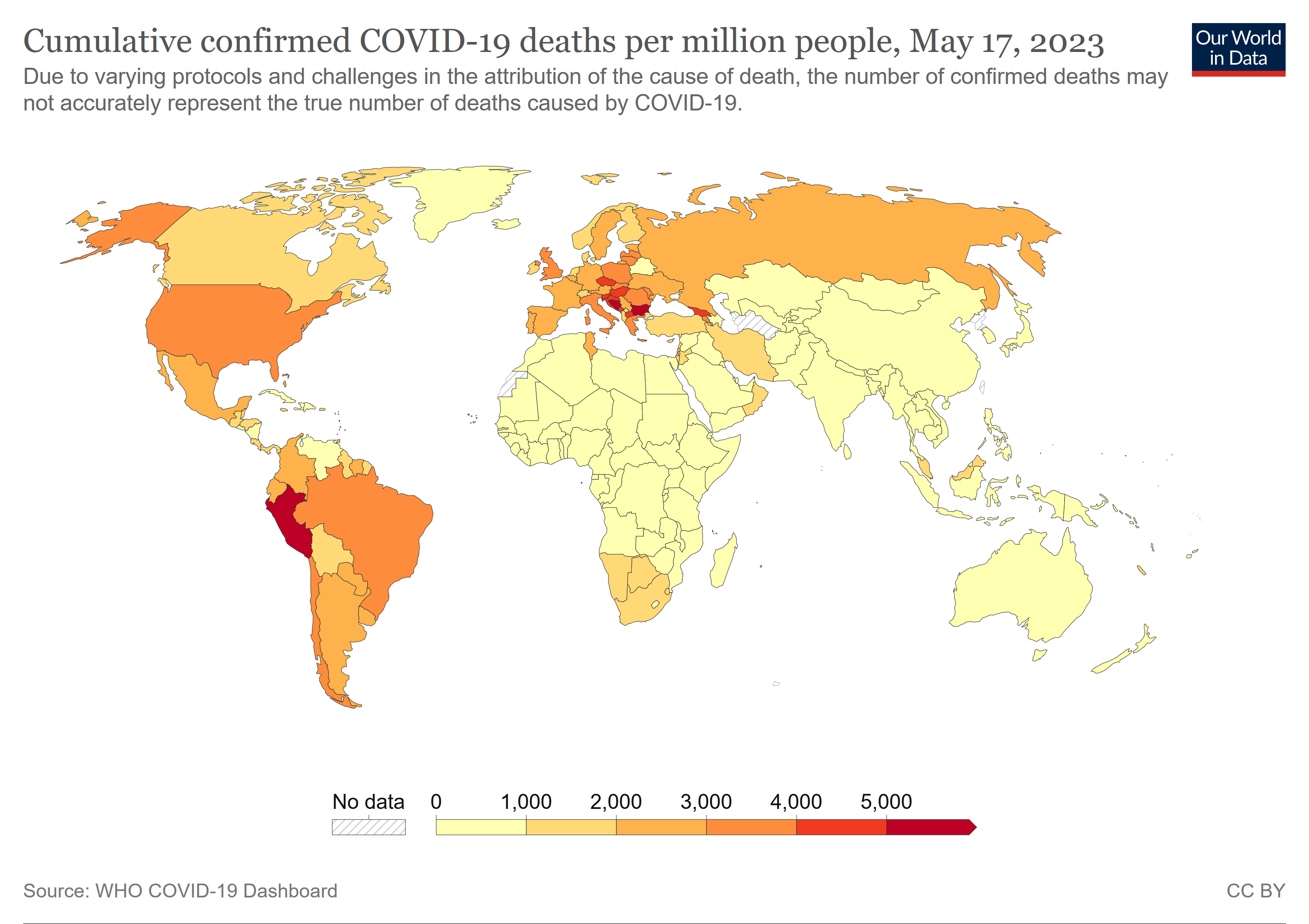
Cumulative COVID-19 death rates per a million people by 17 May 2023

- Statistics of the COVID-19 pandemic
- COVID-19 pandemic cases
- COVID-19 pandemic deaths

== Location ==
=== Geography ===
- COVID-19 pandemic in Africa
- COVID-19 pandemic in Antarctica
- COVID-19 pandemic in Asia
- COVID-19 pandemic in Europe
- COVID-19 pandemic in North America
- COVID-19 pandemic in Oceania
- COVID-19 pandemic in South America

See Category:COVID-19 pandemic by country and Category:COVID-19 pandemic by dependent territory for more specific geographic locations

=== Facilities ===
- Impact of the COVID-19 pandemic on hospitals
- Impact of the COVID-19 pandemic on long-term care facilities
- Impact of the COVID-19 pandemic on prisons

See Category:Ships involved in the COVID-19 pandemic for the role of sea vessels

== Response ==
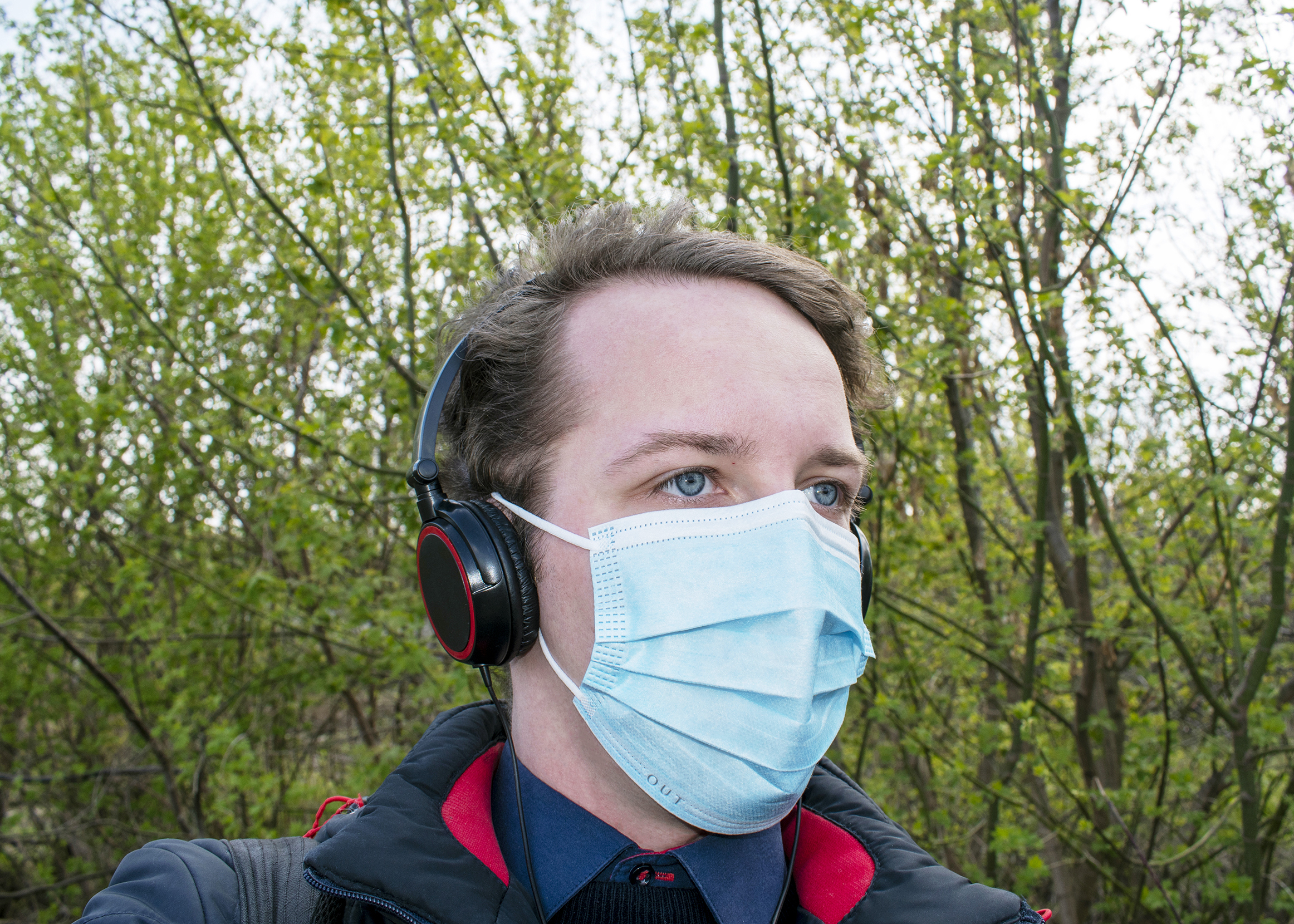
Young man in a facemask during April 2020

- Charitable activities related to the COVID-19 pandemic
- Face masks during the COVID-19 pandemic
- Public health mitigation of COVID-19
- Social distancing measures related to the COVID-19 pandemic
- Wikipedia coverage of the COVID-19 pandemic
- Workplace hazard controls for COVID-19

== Research and science ==
- Impact of the COVID-19 pandemic on science and technology
- COVID-19 drug repurposing research
- Investigations into the origin of COVID-19
- Treatment and management of COVID-19

=== Vaccinations ===
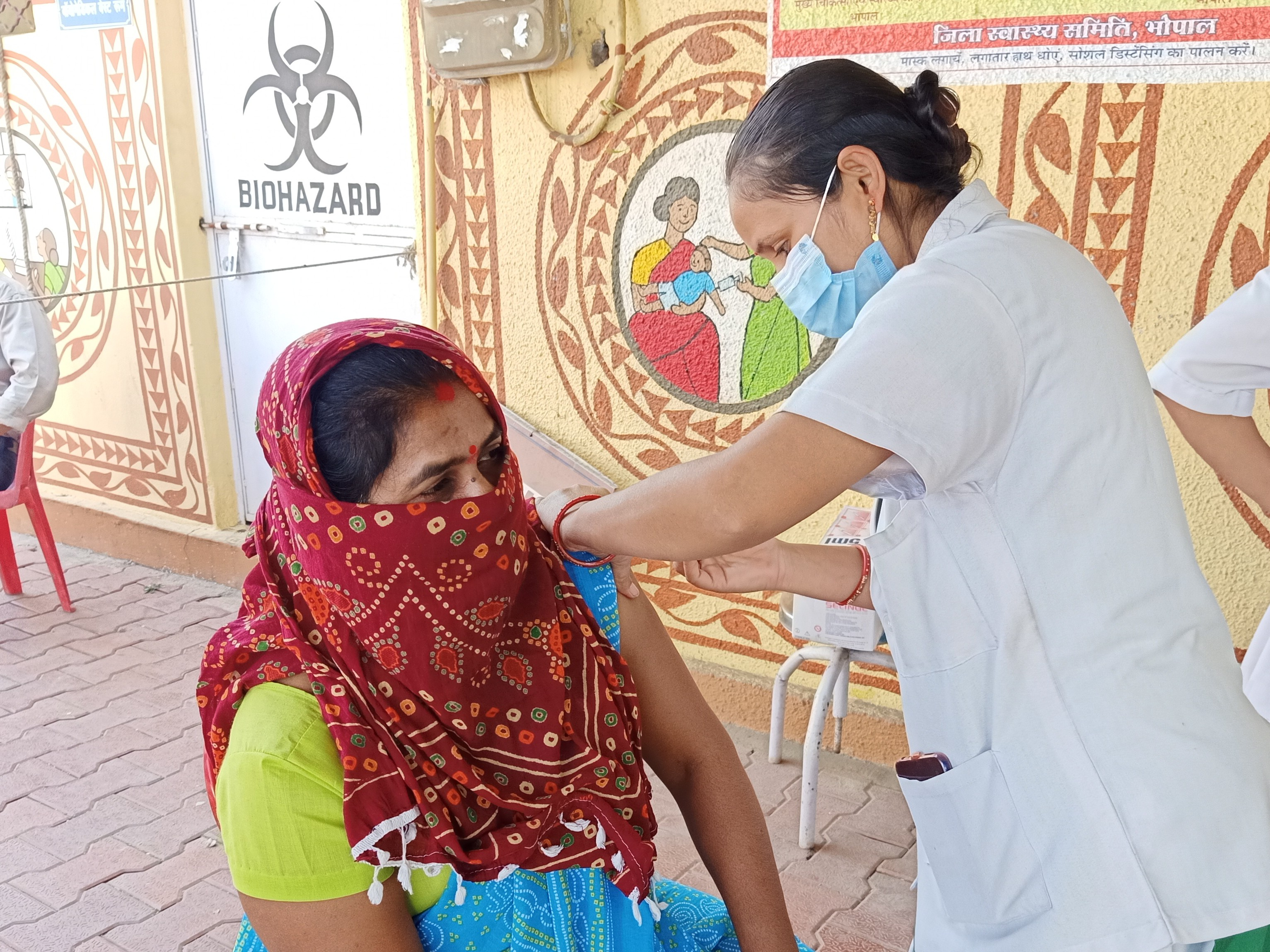
Woman receiving a COVID-19 vaccination

- COVID-19 vaccine
- COVID-19 vaccine clinical research
- Deployment of COVID-19 vaccines
- History of COVID-19 vaccine development
- COVID-19 vaccine misinformation and hesitancy
- Vaccine passports during the COVID-19 pandemic

== Economic impact ==
- Economic impact of the COVID-19 pandemic

=== By sector ===
- Financial market impact of the COVID-19 pandemic
- Impact of the COVID-19 pandemic on the food industry
- Impact of the COVID-19 pandemic on journalism
- Impact of the COVID-19 pandemic on the military
- Impact of the COVID-19 pandemic on retail
- Impact of the COVID-19 pandemic on tourism

=== Related issues ===
- 2020–2023 global chip shortage
- 2020s commodities boom
- 2021–2023 inflation surge
- COVID-19 recession
- 2021–2023 global supply chain crisis
- Shortages related to the COVID-19 pandemic
- Great Resignation

== Society ==
- Map of school closures around the world, red represents where schools were entirely closed at some point in the pandemic and orange where they were partially closed
  Social impact of the COVID-19 pandemic
- COVID-19 pandemic baby bust
- Impact of the COVID-19 pandemic on education
- Human rights issues related to the COVID-19 pandemic
- Protests against responses to the COVID-19 pandemic
- Social stigma associated with COVID-19
- Xenophobia and racism related to the COVID-19 pandemic

=== By group ===
- Impact of the COVID-19 pandemic on children
- Impact of the COVID-19 pandemic on people with disabilities
- Impact of the COVID-19 pandemic on domestic violence
- Gendered impact of the COVID-19 pandemic
- Impact of the COVID-19 pandemic on the LGBT community
- Impact of the COVID-19 pandemic on migration
- Impact of the COVID-19 pandemic on religion

=== Cultural influence ===
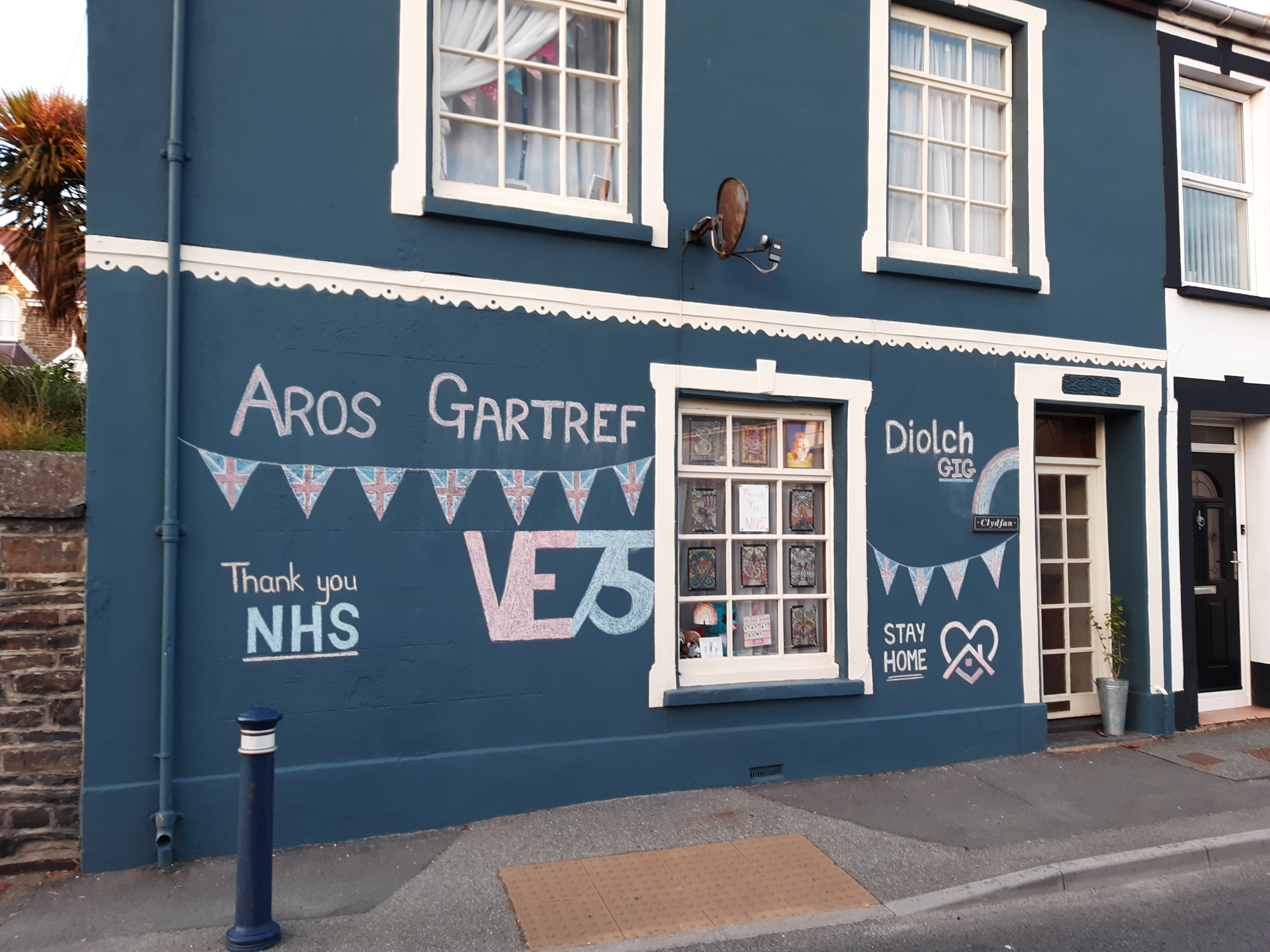
Chalk COVID-19 and VE day themed mural in May 2020

- COVID-19 pandemic in popular culture
- Impact of the COVID-19 pandemic on the arts and cultural heritage
- Impact of the COVID-19 pandemic on cinema
- Impact of the COVID-19 pandemic on the performing arts
- Impact of the COVID-19 pandemic on social media
- Impact of the COVID-19 pandemic on sports
- Impact of the COVID-19 pandemic on television
