= Lawrence Wright =

American writer and journalist (born 1947)

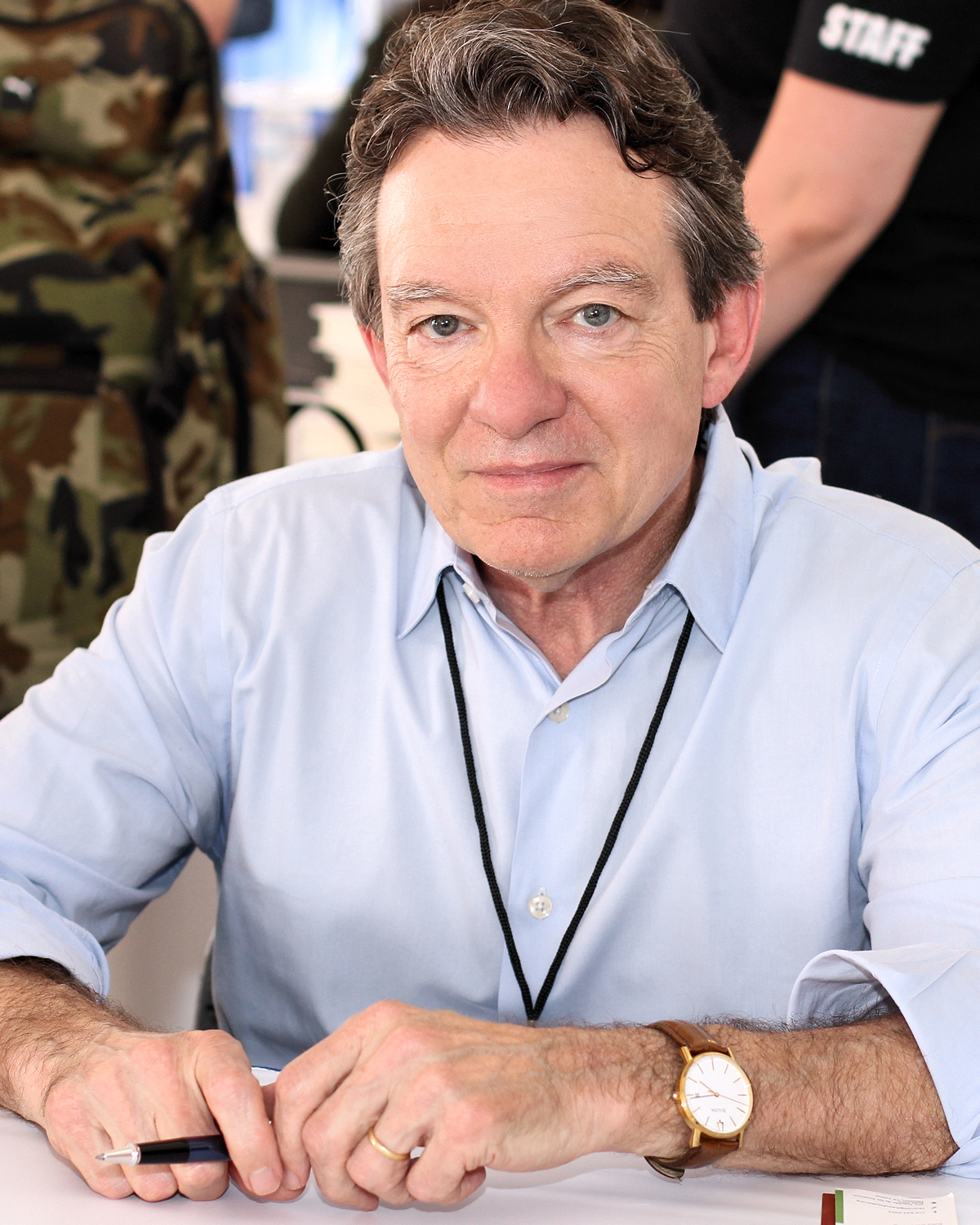
- Wright in 2018
- Born: August 2, 1947 (age 79); Oklahoma City, Oklahoma, U.S.
- Education: Tulane University (BA); American University of Cairo (MA)
- Occupations: Journalist, Writer
- Writing career
- Notable work: The Looming Tower: Al-Qaeda and the Road to 9/11
- Notable awards: Pulitzer Prize for General Nonfiction (2007)
- Website: LawrenceWright.com

Lawrence Wright (born August 2, 1947) is an American writer and journalist, a staff writer for The New Yorker magazine, and fellow at the Center for Law and Security at the New York University School of Law.

Wright is best known as the author of the 2006 nonfiction book, Looming Tower: Al-Qaeda and the Road to 9/11.

He is also known for his work with documentarian Alex Gibney, who directed film versions of Wright's one-man show, My Trip to Al-Qaeda, and his book Going Clear.

== Early life ==
Wright graduated from Woodrow Wilson High School in Dallas, Texas, in 1965 and was inducted into the school's Hall of Fame in 2009. He is a graduate of Tulane University and taught English at the American University in Cairo (from which he was awarded a Master of Arts in Applied Linguistics in 1969) in Egypt for two years. Wright lives in Austin, Texas.

== Career ==
In 1980 Wright began working for the magazine Texas Monthly and contributed to Rolling Stone magazine. In late 1992 he joined the staff of The New Yorker. In 1995, he was writing an article on twins when he stumbled upon an article that referenced a clandestine study conducted by psychiatrist Peter Neubauer in partnership with Louise Wise Services that separated twins for adoption. Wright later adapted his article into a book.

Among Wright's other books are Remembering Satan: A Tragic Case of Recovered Memory (1994), about the Paul Ingram false memory case. On June 7, 1996, Wright testified at Ingram's pardon hearing.

=== The Looming Tower ===
Wright is the author of six books but is best known for his 2006 publication, The Looming Tower: Al-Qaeda and the Road to 9/11. A quick bestseller, The Looming Tower was awarded the J. Anthony Lukas Book Prize, the 2007 Pulitzer Prize for General Nonfiction, and is frequently referred to by some media pundits as being an excellent source of background information on Al Qaeda and the September 11 attacks. The book's title is a phrase from the Quran 4:78: "Wherever you are, death will find you, even in the looming tower," which Osama bin Laden quoted three times in a videotaped speech seen as directed to the 9/11 hijackers.

=== Going Clear ===
In 2011 Wright wrote a profile of former Scientologist Paul Haggis for The New Yorker.

Starting with Haggis and eventually speaking with 200 current and former Scientologists, Wright's book, Going Clear: Scientology, Hollywood, and the Prison of Belief, was published in 2013. The book contains interviews from current and former Scientologists and examines the history and leadership of the organisation. In an interview for The New York Times, Wright disclosed that he had received "innumerable" letters threatening legal action from lawyers representing the Church of Scientology and celebrities who were members of it.

The New York Times published Michael Kinsley's review of the book, where he wrote: "That crunching sound you hear is Lawrence Wright bending over backward to be fair to Scientology. Every deceptive comparison with Mormonism and other religions is given a respectful hearing. Every ludicrous bit of church dogma is served up deadpan. This makes the book's indictment that much more powerful."

In 2015, Alex Gibney produced a documentary based on Wright's book, titled Going Clear: Scientology and the Prison of Belief. The film was nominated for seven Emmy Awards, winning three, and received a 2015 Peabody Award "for its detailed documentation of Scientology's history and abuses."

=== Other projects ===
His 2020 novel, The End of October, a thriller about a pandemic, was released in April 2020 during the COVID-19 pandemic, to generally positive reviews.

Wright co-wrote the screenplay for the film The Siege (1998), which tells the story of a terrorist attack in New York City that leads to curtailed civil liberties and rounding up of Arab-Americans. A script that Wright originally wrote for Oliver Stone was turned instead into thed Showtime movie, Noriega: God's Favorite (2000).

A documentary featuring Wright, My Trip to Al-Qaeda, premiered on HBO in September 2010. It was based on his journeys and experiences in the Middle East during his research for The Looming Tower. My Trip to Al-Qaeda looks at al-Qaeda, Islamist extremism, anti-American sentiment and the U.S. military presence in Afghanistan and Iraq and combines Wright's first-person narrative with documentary footage and photographs.

Wright plays the keyboard in the Austin, Texas, blues collective WhoDo.

Wright is also a playwright. He has worked on a script over several years concerning the making of the epic film Cleopatra that starred Elizabeth Taylor, Richard Burton and Rex Harrison. The play is titled Cleo and was to have opened September 2017 in Houston, Texas, but was delayed by catastrophic flooding caused by Hurricane Harvey. It eventually opened in April 2018.

== Awards and honors ==
- 2006 Los Angeles Times Book Prize for The Looming Tower
- 2006 New York Times bestseller for The Looming Tower
- 2006 New York Times Notable Book of the Year for The Looming Tower
- 2006 New York Times Best Books of the Year for The Looming Tower
- 2006 IRE Award for The Looming Tower
- 2006 National Book Award finalist for The Looming Tower
- 2006 Los Angeles Times Book Prize finalist for The Looming Tower
- 2006 Time magazine's Best Books of the Year for The Looming Tower
- 2007 Pulitzer Prize for General Nonfiction for The Looming Tower
- 2007 Helen Bernstein Book Award for Excellence in Journalism for The Looming Tower
- 2007 J. Anthony Lukas Book Prize for The Looming Tower
- 2007 Lionel Gelber Prize for The Looming Tower
- 2007 Arthur Ross Book Award shortlist for The Looming Tower
- 2007 PEN Center USA Literary Award (Research Nonfiction) for The Looming Tower
- 2009 Newsweek 50 Books for Our Times for The Looming Tower
- 2013 National Book Award for Nonfiction finalist for Going Clear
- 2013 National Book Critics Circle Award (Nonfiction) shortlist for Going Clear
- 2015 Primetime Emmy Award for Outstanding Documentary or Nonfiction Special.

== Bibliography ==
=== Books ===
Nonfiction

- City Children, Country Summer: A Story of Ghetto Children Among the Amish. Scribner. 1979.
- In the New World: growing up with America, 1964–1984. Alfred A. Knopf. 1988.
- Saints and Sinners. Alfred A. Knopf. 1993. ISBN 978-0-679-76163-1.
- Remembering Satan: A Tragic Case of Recovered Memory. Vintage Books. 1994. ISBN 978-0-679-75582-1.
- Twins: And What They Tell Us About Who We Are. John Wiley & Sons. 1997. ISBN 978-0-471-29644-7.
- The Looming Tower. Alfred A. Knopf. 2006. ISBN 978-0-375-41486-2.
- Going Clear: Scientology, Hollywood, and the Prison of Belief. Alfred A. Knopf. 2013. ISBN 978-0-307-70066-7.
- Thirteen Days in September: Carter, Begin and Sadat at Camp David. Alfred A. Knopf. 2014. ISBN 978-0-385-35203-1.
- The Terror Years: From Al-Qaeda to the Islamic State. Alfred A. Knopf. 2016. ISBN 978-0-385-35205-5.
- God Save Texas: A Journey into the Soul of the Lone Star State. Alfred A. Knopf. 2018. ISBN 978-0-525-52010-8.
- The Plague Year: America in the Time of Covid. Alfred A. Knopf. 2021. ISBN 978-0-593-32072-3
- Redemption: Faith, Justice, and Sisterhood on Death Row. Alfred A. Knopf. 2026. ISBN 978-0-593-80508-4.

Fiction

- God's Favorite: A Novel. Simon and Schuster. 2000. ISBN 978-0-684-86810-3.
- The End of October: A Novel. Alfred A. Knopf. April 28, 2020. p. 400. ISBN 978-0-52565-865-8.
- Mr. Texas: A Novel. Alfred A. Knopf. 2023. ISBN 978-0-593-53737-4.
- The Human Scale: A Novel. Alfred A Knopf. 2025. ISBN 978-0-593-53783-1

=== Plays ===
- Camp David (premiered at Arena Stage (Washington, D.C.) in March 2014)

=== Essays and reporting ===
- "The Agent". The New Yorker. July 3, 2006.
- "Intolerance". The Talk of the Town. Comment. The New Yorker. 86 (28): 47–48. September 20, 2010.
- "The apostate : Paul Haggis vs. the Church of Scientology". Profiles. The New Yorker. February 14, 2011.
- "Homage to Zenobia". The Talk of the Town. Comment. The New Yorker. 91 (20): 17–18. July 20, 2015. (Note: Title in the online table of contents is "Palmyra, from Zenobia to ISIS".)
- "America's future is Texas". The New Yorker. July 7, 2017.
- "The plague year : the mistakes and the struggles behind an American tragedy". A Reporter at Large. The New Yorker. 96 (43): 20–59. January 4–11, 2021.
- "No city limits" my town, Austin, known for laid-back weirdness, is transforming into a turbocharged tech capital". Letter from Texas. The New Yorker. 99 (1): 34–49. February 13–20, 2023. (Note: Online version is titled "The astonishing transformation of Austin".)

———————

Bibliography notes
