= Born with Teeth =

2022 play by Liz Duffy Adams

- West End Promotional Poster
- Original language: English
- Written by: Liz Duffy Adams
- Characters: Christopher Marlowe; William Shakespeare
- Genre: Drama

Premiere
- Date: May 2022
- Place: Alley Theatre; Houston

Born with Teeth is a play by Liz Duffy Adams about the relationship between playwrights William Shakespeare and Christopher Marlowe.

== Production history ==
The play received its world premiere at Alley Theatre in Houston on May 11, 2022. It was directed by Rob Melrose and starred Matthew Amendt and Dylan Godwin as Marlowe and Shakespeare respectively. Followed by a run at the Guthrie Theater from March 4–April 2, 2023.

A production opened in Berkeley, California, from September 1 to October 1, 2023, at the Aurora Theatre Company. The play was directed by Josh Costello, and starred Dean Linnard as Marlowe and Brady Morales-Woolery as Shakespeare.

Another production opened in Seattle, Washington, from February 1 to February 25, 2024, at the ArtsWest. The play was directed by Mat Wright, and starred Michael Monicatti as Marlowe and Ricky Spaulding as Shakespeare.

The play was performed in Ashland, Oregon, from March 20 to October 13, 2024, at the Oregon Shakespeare Festival. The play was directed by Rob Melrose. Alex Purcell played Marlowe and Shakespeare was played by Bradley James Tejada (3/20 - 9/14) and Jaysen Wright (9/18 - 10/13).

The play had its UK premiere in London's West End, presented by the Royal Shakespeare Company at the Wyndham's Theatre. Performances began 13 August 2025 and are scheduled to run to 1 November. RSC co-Artistic Director Daniel Evans directed and the production starred Ncuti Gatwa as Marlowe and Edward Bluemel as Shakespeare. Following the 2025 West End run, the production will run at the Swan Theatre, Stratford-upon-Avon from 12 February to 3 April 2027, with Evans directing again. Casting is to be announced.

== Cast and characters ==
Character	Houston	Berkeley	Seattle	Ashland	West End
Character	2022	2023	2024	2024	2025
William Shakespeare	Dylan Godwin	Brady Morales-Woolery	Ricky Spaulding	Bradley James Tejada Jaysen Wright	Edward Bluemel
Christopher "Kit" Marlowe	Matthew Amendt	Dean Linnard	Michael Monicatti	Alex Purcell	Ncuti Gatwa

== Critical reception ==
For the West End production, The Guardian's reviewer gave it 3 out of 5 stars, saying: "An intelligent slice of historical fiction that offers muscular performances and reminds us to lavish more attention on the other great Elizabethan playwright, Born With Teeth yearns for a sharper bite."
