= Wyndham's Theatre =

West End theatre in London

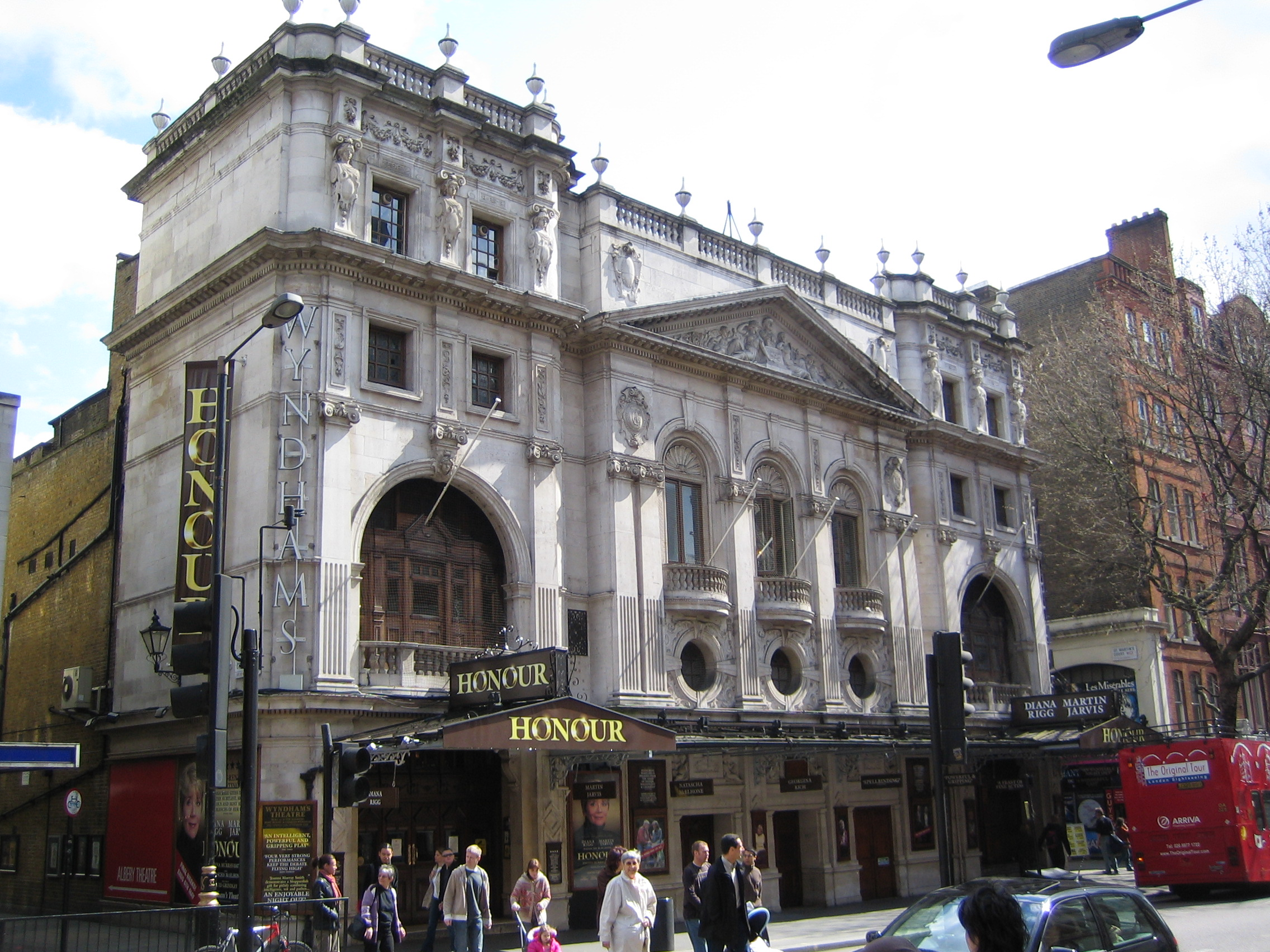
- Honour, starring Diana Rigg, at Wyndham's in 2006
- Interactive map of Wyndham's Theatre
- Address: St. Martin's Court; London, WC2; United Kingdom
- Coordinates: 51.511111°N 0.128222°W
- Owner: Salisbury Estate
- Operator: Delfont Mackintosh Theatres
- Capacity: 799 on 4 levels
- Type: West End theatre
- Designation: Grade II* listed
- Production: Hay Fever
- Public transit: Leicester Square

Construction
- Opened: 16 November 1899; 127 years ago
- Architect: W. G. R. Sprague

Website
- Wyndham's Theatre page on the Delfont Mackintosh Theatres site

Wyndham's Theatre is a West End theatre, one of two opened by actor/manager Sir Charles Wyndham (the other is the Criterion Theatre). Located on Charing Cross Road in the City of Westminster, it was designed c. 1898 by W. G. R. Sprague, the architect of six other London theatres between then and 1916. It was designed to seat 759 patrons on three levels; later refurbishment increased this to four seating levels. The theatre was Grade II* listed by English Heritage in September 1960.

== History ==
Wyndham had always dreamed of building a theatre of his own, and through the admiration of a patron and the financial confidence of friends, he was able to realise his dream. Wyndham's Theatre opened on 16 November 1899, in the presence of the Prince of Wales. The first play performed there was a revival of T. W. Robertson's David Garrick. A number of successes followed, including Lena Ashwell playing the lead role in Mrs Dane's Defence in 1900, upon which Wyndham said that "the applause when the curtain fell was the most tremendous he had ever known".

In 1910, Gerald du Maurier began an association with the theatre which lasted 15 years and to include the stage debut of the screen actress Tallulah Bankhead. Du Maurier's small daughter, Daphne, often watched her father's performance from the wings. Thirty years later she presented her own play, The Years Between, on the same stage. In 1917, J. M. Barrie's Dear Brutus ran for more than 360 performances at Wyndham's. The same play was revived in 1922 for another lengthy run.

In April 1953, the theatre premiered Graham Greene's first play, The Living Room, with a cast including Dorothy Tutin. In January 1954, a small-scale musical pastiche, Sandy Wilson's The Boy Friend, which had premiered at the much smaller Players' Theatre, was moved to the Wyndham stage. It ran for 2,078 performances, before eventually transferring to Broadway. During the 60s and early 70s, the theatre continued to provide a setting for stars such as Alec Guinness (Wise Child), Vanessa Redgrave and Diana Rigg.

The blockbuster of the 1970s decade – Godspell – opened at Wyndham's in January 1972 and ran to October 1974. The original cast included David Essex, Marti Webb and Jeremy Irons.

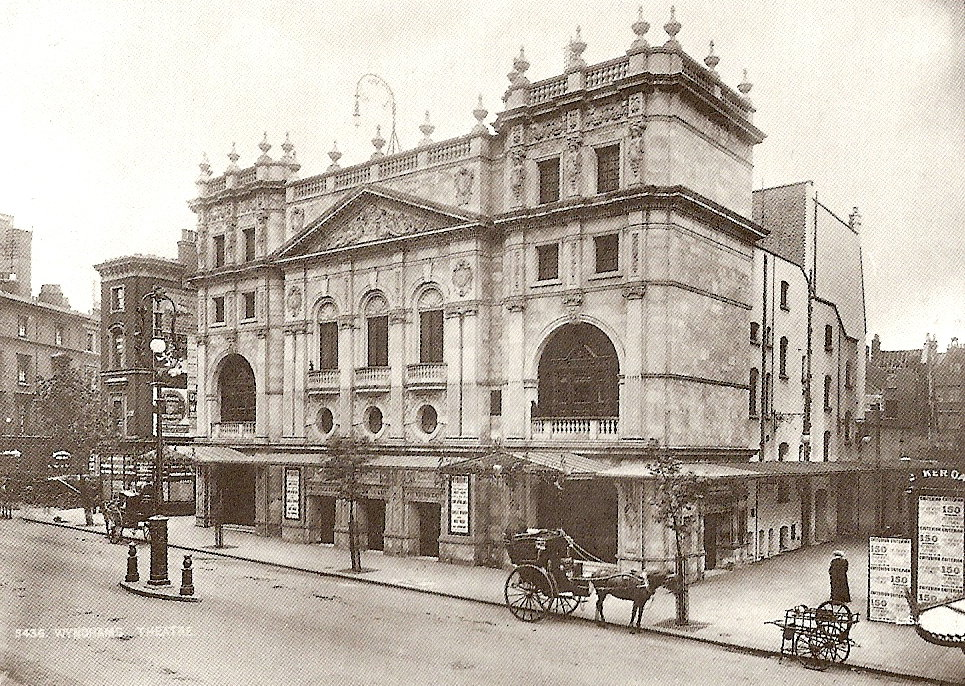
Wyndham's Theatre just before its opening on 16 November 1900

Among more recent distinguished productions were the world premiere of The Ride Down Mt. Morgan by American playwright Arthur Miller and the British premiere of Edward Albee's Three Tall Women, starring Maggie Smith. Twenty-five years after making her debut there, Diana Rigg returned to play a hugely successful season as Medea. The critically acclaimed comedy, Art, by Yasmina Reza, began its record-breaking run at Wyndham's in 1996 with Albert Finney, Tom Courtenay and Ken Stott in the cast. It opened in October 1996, and transferred to the Whitehall Theatre in October 2001.

Madonna made her West End debut there in 2002, performing in a sell-out production of Up For Grabs. This was followed by many other dramatic productions, including Dinner and the National Theatre's Democracy during 2004, Holly Hunter in By The Bog Of Cats, American TV star Ruby Wax in a children's stage version of The Witches, which ran during March 2005; followed by a controversial limited season of Eve Ensler's The Vagina Monologues, which ran without the stars – Sharon Osbourne and her daughter Aimee, who dropped out the night before the production opened. In 2005, theatre patrons saw Helen McCrory star alongside Sienna Miller, Reece Shearsmith and Clive Rowe in a production of Shakespeare's As You Like It.

A large-scale replica of the facade of the theatre was constructed at the Universal Studios theme park in Orlando, Florida, as part of the park's London-themed area.

== Delfont Mackintosh era ==
In May 2005, the theatre was taken over by Sir Cameron Mackintosh's Delfont-Mackintosh Ltd., which began operations of the venue in September 2005. In October 2005, the theatre presented Tom Stoppard's Heroes, a translation of the French play Le vent des peupliers by Gérald Sibleyras, which starred Richard Griffiths and John Hurt.

The following year the theatre hosted a new production of Joanna Murray-Smith's play Honour starring Diana Rigg, Martin Jarvis and Natascha McElhone, which ran between 7 February and 6 May 2006. It later hosted the West End transfer of the Menier Chocolate Factory's hit production of Stephen Sondheim's musical Sunday in the Park with George, which starred Daniel Evans and Jenna Russell and ran till September. Between December 2006 and April 2007, the theatre presented the West End commercial transfer of Alan Bennett's National Theatre hit The History Boys which played to sell-out houses during its run until April 2007.

Bill Kenwright's production of Somerset Maugham's The Letter played through summer 2007. There was a short hiatus after Chita Rivera was forced to postpone a scheduled London return. Shadowlands, based on the life story of C. S. Lewis opened in October 2007, starring Charles Dance and Janie Dee, before another return of Alan Bennett's The History Boys from December 2007.

The theatre closed temporarily for refurbishment works, before reopening in September 2008 with Kenneth Branagh starring in Michael Grandage's production of Chekhov's Ivanov. This new version by Tom Stoppard was the opening play in the Donmar West End twelve-month season at Wyndham's, with tickets at Donmar Warehouse prices.

The Donmar West End season also included Derek Jacobi starring in Twelfth Night, Judi Dench in Yukio Mishima's Madame de Sade, and Jude Law in Hamlet, all staged by Grandage.

== Recent, present, and future productions ==
- Dinner (9 December 2003 – 3 April 2004) by Moira Buffini starring Harriet Walter
- Democracy (20 April 2004 – 9 October 2004) by Michael Frayn, starring Colm Meaney
- Dylan Moran: Monster II (1 November 2004 – 13 November 2004)
- By the Bog of Cats (1 December 2004 – 26 February 2005) by Marina Carr, starring Holly Hunter
- The Witches (9 March 2005 – 2 April 2005) by David Wood, starring Ruby Wax
- The Vagina Monologues (7 April 2005 – 14 May 2005), by Eve Ensler
- As You Like It (21 June 2005 – 17 September 2005) by William Shakespeare, starring Helen McCrory, Sienna Miller and Clive Rowe
- Heroes (18 October 2005 – 14 January 2006) by Gérald Sibleyras, starring Richard Griffiths, John Hurt and Ken Stott
- Honour (14 February 2006 – 6 May 2006) by Joanna Murray-Smith, starring Diana Rigg and Martin Jarvis
- Sunday in the Park with George (23 May 2006 – 2 September 2006) by Stephen Sondheim, starring Daniel Evans and Jenna Russell
- A Voyage Round My Father (21 September 2006 – 18 November 2006) by John Mortimer, starring Derek Jacobi
- The History Boys (18 December 2006 – 14 April 2007) by Alan Bennett
- The Letter (19 April 2007 – 10 August 2007), by Somerset Maugham, starring Jenny Seagrove and Anthony Andrews
- Shadowlands (3 October 2007 – 17 December 2007) by William Nicholson, starring Charles Dance and Janie Dee (transferred to the Novello Theatre)
- The History Boys (20 December 2007 – 26 April 2008) by Alan Bennett, starring Desmond Barrit
- The Shawshank Redemption (14 September 2009 – 29 November 2009)
- An Inspector Calls (3 December 2009 – 10 March 2010) by J. B. Priestley
- Avenue Q (19 March 2010 – 30 October 2010) (following closure at the Gielgud Theatre)
- Bill Bailey – Dandelion Mind (2 November 2010 – 8 January 2011)
- Clybourne Park (8 February 2011 – 7 May 2011) by Bruce Norris (transferred from the Royal Court Theatre)
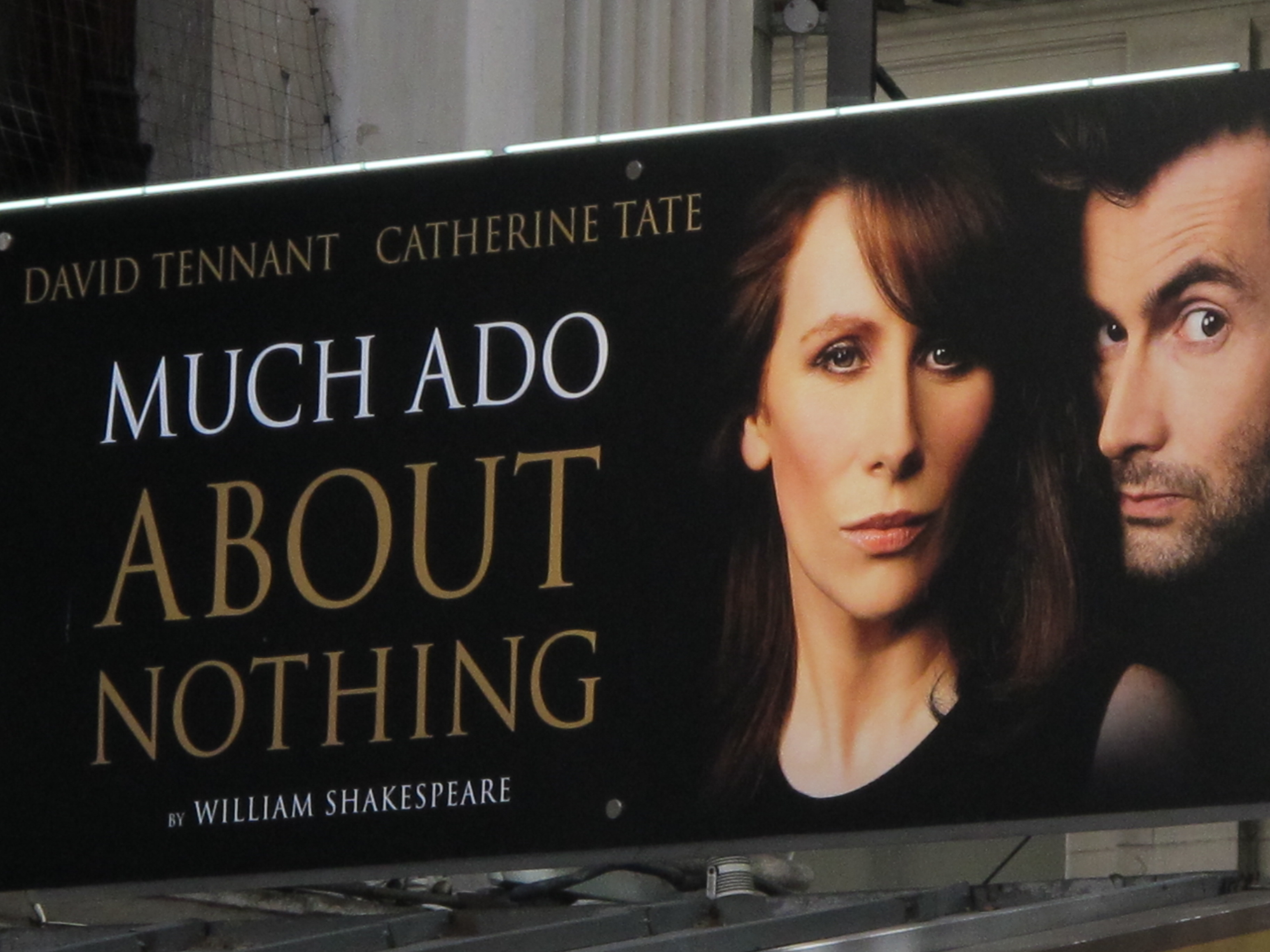
  The official poster for the 2011 production of Much Ado About Nothing with David Tennant and Catherine Tate
- Much Ado About Nothing (1 June 2011 – 3 September 2011) by William Shakespeare, starring David Tennant and Catherine Tate
- Driving Miss Daisy (5 October 2011 – 17 December 2011) by Alfred Uhry, starring James Earl Jones and Vanessa Redgrave
- Christmas with the Rat Pack: Live from Las Vegas (20 December 2011 – 7 January 2012)
- The Rat Pack: Live From Las Vegas (9 January 2012 – 21 January 2012)
- Jackie Mason – Fearless (13 February 2012 – 17 March 2012)
- The King's Speech (22 March 2012 – 12 May 2012) (stage play of the Oscar-winning film)
- Abigail's Party (18 May 2012 – 1 September 2012) by Mike Leigh, starring Jill Halfpenny
- Dreamboats and Petticoats (16 October 2012 – 19 January 2013) (limited run following closure at the Playhouse Theatre)
- Quartermaine's Terms (29 January 2013 – 13 April 2013) by Simon Gray, starring Rowan Atkinson
- Relatively Speaking (16 May 2013 – 31 August 2013) by Alan Ayckbourn, starring Felicity Kendal and Kara Tointon
- Barking in Essex (16 September 2013 – 4 January 2014) by Clive Exton, starring Lee Evans and Sheila Hancock
- The Weir (22 January 2014 – 19 April 2014) by Conor McPherson, starring Brian Cox, Ardal O'Hanlon and Dervla Kirwan
- Uncle Vanya and Three Sisters (23 April 2014 – 3 May 2014) (performed in Russian with a Russian cast)
- Skylight (18 June 2014 – 23 August 2014) by David Hare, starring Bill Nighy and Carey Mulligan
- King Charles III (11 September 2014 – 31 January 2015) by Mike Bartlett, starring Tim Pigott-Smith
- A View from the Bridge (16 February 2015 – 11 April 2015) by Arthur Miller, starring Mark Strong, Nicola Walker and Phoebe Fox
- American Buffalo (27 April 2015 – 27 June 2015) by David Mamet, starring Damian Lewis, John Goodman and Tom Sturridge
- The Mentalists (13 July 2015 – 29 August 2015) by Richard Bean, starring Stephen Merchant and Steffan Rhodri
- The Father (5 October 2015 – 21 November 2015) by Florian Zeller, in a translation by Christopher Hampton, starring Kenneth Cranham and Claire Skinner
- Hangmen (7 December 2015 – 5 March 2016) by Martin McDonagh, starring David Morrissey
- People, Places and Things (23 March 2016 – 18 June 2016) by Duncan Macmillan, starring Denise Gough
- The Truth (27 June 2016 – 3 September 2016) by Florian Zeller, in a translation by Christopher Hampton, starring Tanya Franks and Alexander Hanson
- No Man's Land (20 September 2016 – 17 December 2016) by Harold Pinter, starring Ian McKellen and Patrick Stewart
- The Kite Runner (10 January 2017 – 11 March 2017) by Khaled Hosseini, adapted by Matthew Spangler, starring Ben Turner
- Don Juan in Soho (28 March 2017 – 10 June 2017) by Patrick Marber, starring David Tennant, Adrian Scarborough and Gawn Grainger
- Lady Day at Emerson's Bar and Grill (27 June 2017 – 9 September 2017) by Lanie Robertson, starring Audra McDonald
- Heisenberg: The Uncertainty Principle (9 October 2017 – 6 January 2018) by Simon Stephens, starring Anne-Marie Duff and Kenneth Cranham
- Long Day's Journey into Night (6 February 2018 – 8 April 2018) by Eugene O'Neill, starring Jeremy Irons and Lesley Manville
- The Height of the Storm (9 October 2018 – 1 December 2018) by Florian Zeller, in a translation by Christopher Hampton, starring Jonathan Pryce and Eileen Atkins
- Bill Bailey - Larks in Transit (3 December 2018 – 5 January 2019)
- The Catherine Tate Show Live (7 January 2019 – 12 January 2019)
- The Price (11 February 2019 – 27 April 2019) by Arthur Miller, starring David Suchet
- The Starry Messenger (29 May 2019 – 10 August 2019) by Kenneth Lonergan, starring Matthew Broderick and Elizabeth McGovern
- Fleabag (28 August 2019 – 14 September 2019) by Phoebe Waller-Bridge, starring Phoebe Waller-Bridge
- The Man in the White Suit (8 October 2019 – 7 December 2019) by Sean Foley, starring Stephen Mangan, Kara Tointon and Sue Johnston
- Curtains (13 December 2019 – 11 January 2020) by Kander and Ebb, starring Jason Manford, Ore Oduba and Carley Stenson
- Leopoldstadt (12 June 2021 – 4 September 2021) by Tom Stoppard (production previously played here from January to March 2020, when theatres closed due to COVID-19 pandemic)
- Life of Pi (15 November 2021 – 15 January 2023)
- Oklahoma! (16 February 2023 – 2 September 2023) by Rodgers and Hammerstein
- The Old Man and the Pool (12 September 2023 - 7 October 2023) by Mike Birbiglia
- King Lear (21 October - 9 December 2023) by William Shakespeare, starring Kenneth Branagh
- The Unfriend (16 December 2023 - 9 March 2024) by Stephen Moffat starring Lee Mack, Sarah Alexander and Frances Barber, directed by Mark Gatiss
- Long Day's Journey into Night (19 March 2024 – 8 June 2024) by Eugene O'Neill, starring Brian Cox, Patricia Clarkson and Louisa Harland, directed by Jeremy Herrin
- Next to Normal (18 June 2024 – 21 September 2024) by Tom Kitt and Brian Yorkey
- Oedipus (4 October 2024 – 4 January 2025) by Sophocles, starring Mark Strong and Lesley Manville, directed by Robert Icke
- Inside No. 9 Stage/Fright (16 January – 5 April 2025), written by and starring Steve Pemberton and Reece Shearsmith, directed by Simon Evans
- Born With Teeth (13 August 2025 – 1 November 2025) by Liz Duffy Adams, starring Ncuti Gatwa and Edward Bluemel
- All My Sons (14 November 2025 – 7 March 2026) by Arthur Miller, starring Bryan Cranston, Marianne Jean-Baptiste and Paapa Essiedu
- Inter Alia (19 March 2026 – 20 June 2026) by Suzie Miller, starring Rosamund Pike – a transfer from the National Theatre production (2025)
- To Kill a Mockingbird (25 June 2026 – 12 September 2026) by Aaron Sorkin from the novel by Harper Lee
- Hay Fever (22 September 2026 – 12 December 2026) by Noël Coward, starring Christine Baranski and Richard E. Grant
- Christmas Carol Goes Wrong (18 December 2026 – 23 January 2027)
- John Proctor is the Villain (2 February 2027 – 24 April 2027)
- History (17 May 2027 - 7 August 2027) starring John Malkovich and Rosalind Eleazar

=== Donmar West End at Wyndham's ===
- Ivanov (17 September 2008 – 29 November 2008) by Anton Chekhov in a new version by Tom Stoppard, starring Kenneth Branagh and Kevin R McNally
- Twelfth Night (10 December 2008 – 7 March 2009) by William Shakespeare, starring Derek Jacobi
- Madame de Sade (18 March 2009 – 23 May 2009) by Yukio Mishima, starring Judi Dench and Rosamund Pike
- Hamlet (3 June 2009 – 22 August 2009) by William Shakespeare, starring Jude Law

=== Michael Grandage Company ===
- Red (15 May 2018 – 28 July 2018) by John Logan, starring Alfred Molina and Alfred Enoch
- My Master Builder (17 April 2025 – 12 July 2025) by Lila Raicek, starring Ewan McGregor

== Bibliography ==
- Guide to British Theatres 1750–1950, John Earl and Michael Sell pp. 150 (Theatres Trust, 2000) ISBN 0-7136-5688-3
