= Mrs. 'Arris Goes to Paris =

1958 novel by American writer Paul Gallico

- First edition cover
- Author: Paul Gallico
- Language: English
- Publisher: Doubleday
- Publication date: 1958
- Publication place: United States
- Media type: Print (hardcover)
- Pages: 157
- Followed by: Mrs. 'Arris Goes to New York

Mrs. 'Arris Goes to Paris is a novel written by Paul Gallico and published in 1958. In the United Kingdom, it was published as Flowers for Mrs Harris. It was the first in a series of four books about the adventures of a London charwoman.

== Plot ==
The plot revolves around Ada Harris, who is so enchanted by her employer's haute couture wardrobe that she becomes determined to go to the House of Dior in Paris to purchase an evening gown of her own. She achieves her goal with the assistance of a French marquis, whom she first meets at the House of Dior during an afternoon showing and who becomes a long-term friend, as do a series of other characters revealed to have hidden hearts. The comic tale takes on a final poignant overtone when the dress is loaned to an up-and-coming actress, with disastrous consequences. Initially devastated, Mrs. Harris reflects that the experiences she had in pursuit of the dress were worth its loss.

== Sequels ==
Subsequent titles in the series are Mrs. 'Arris Goes to New York (1960), Mrs. 'Arris Goes to Parliament (1965), and Mrs. 'Arris Goes to Moscow (1974). (The original UK titles were Mrs Harris Goes to New York, Mrs Harris MP, and Mrs Harris Goes to Moscow.)

In New York, the French Count re-appears and, again, all but one or two characters reveal hidden hearts.

In Parliament, Mrs Harris finds that being nice, kind and hopeful does not always lead to people being nice and kind in return. There is rather less comedy in this third book.

In Moscow, Mrs Harris wins a trip there and stumbles onto the Soviet Union's most embarrassing problem: it has bought a cargo of toilet paper that has had to be marked as birdseed.

== Adaptations ==
=== Film and television ===
- Mrs. ‘Arris Goes to Paris (1958) American TV episode (45–50 minutes) for the television series Studio One starring British comedian Gracie Fields. Currently not released for home media.
- Ein Kleid von Dior (1982) West German TV film starring Inge Meysel; followed by five more TV films based on Paul Gallico's novels.
- Mrs. ‘Arris Goes to Paris (1992) a TV movie starring Angela Lansbury, Diana Rigg, and Omar Sharif. The film was produced by Lansbury's production company Corymore Productions, and directed by Lansbury's son, Anthony Shaw.
- Gangoobai (2013) feature film starring Sarita Joshi and Raj Zutshi. A Maid-in-Matheran has lived a life with simple aspirations, until one day she finds a new purpose of buying a designer sari. She follows her dream to the big city of Mumbai.
- Mrs. Harris Goes to Paris (2022) feature film starring Lesley Manville and Isabelle Huppert.

=== Stage musical ===
The musical-theatre adaptation Flowers for Mrs Harris, with book by Rachel Wagstaff and music and lyrics by Richard Taylor, was produced by Sheffield Theatres in May 2016, directed by Daniel Evans, having been originally commissioned by Vicky Graham Productions. The production won three UK Theatre Awards: Best Design (Lez Brotherston), Best Performer in a Musical (Clare Burt in the titular role), and Best Musical Production. The awards were presented at the UK Theatre Awards ceremony at London's Guildhall in October 2016. A new production was mounted at Chichester Festival Theatre in September 2018, again directed by Daniel Evans, starring Clare Burt once more as Mrs Harris, alongside Joanna Riding as Lady Dant/Madam Colbert, Claire Machin as Violet Butterfield, and Gary Wilmot as the Major/Monsieur Armand. The production was streamed online to great acclaim in April 2020.

The complete 2018 Chichester Festival Theatre cast and orchestra reassembled over 3 days in July 2020 to record the score. The recording took place on stage at the Festival Theatre, due to the restriction imposed as a result of the COVID-19 pandemic making it impossible to record in a studio, whereas the Festival Theatre stage was large enough to accommodate full cast and band, sufficiently distanced. It was conducted by Tom Brady and recording engineer was Mike Walker. The recording was released in 2020.
