= Y Mabinogi =

2003 Welsh animated film based on the Mabinogion

- Frame from the film
- Directed by: Derek W. Hayes; Marc Evans
- Written by: Martin Lamb; Penelope Middleboe
- Based on: graphic novel by Mike Collins
- Produced by: Naomi Jones
- Starring: Daniel Evans; Jenny Livsey; Matthew Rhys
- Edited by: William Oswald
- Music by: John Cale
- Production companies: Sianel Pedwar Cymru, S4C International; Cartwn Cymru Production; Cyngor Celfyddydau Cyrmu/Arts Council of Wales; BBC Cymru; British Screen; British Sky Broadcasting; Odyssey Entertainment
- Distributed by: Miracle Communications
- Release date: 27 June 2003
- Running time: 108 minutes
- Countries: United Kingdom; Wales
- Languages: Welsh; English

Y Mabinogi (also known as Otherworld) is a 2003 Welsh film directed by Derek W. Hayes (animation) and Marc Evans (live action) and starring Daniel Evans, Jenny Livsey and Matthew Rhys. It was written by Martin Lamb and Penelope Middleboe based the 2001 graphic novel of the same title by Mike Collins, itself based on a series of Welsh tales written by bards in the Middle Ages. The film is mostly animated, although the beginning and end sequences are live action.

The film is available in both Welsh and English language versions.

== Plot ==
Dan, Rhiannon and Lleu are out on a boat trip and come across a strange floating island under the water. When they dive down to it they find themselves transported from their contemporary world in West Wales to the setting of the tales of Welsh mythology known as the Four Branches of the Mabinogi (Welsh: Pedair Cainc y Mabinogi, often referred to asY Mabinogi).

== Cast ==
=== Animation (voices) ===
- Daniel Evans as Dan
- Jenny Livsey as Rhiannon
- Matthew Rhys as Lleu
- Siôn Alun Davies as young Lleu
- Sue Jones Davies as Siân
- Ioan Gruffudd as King Bendigeidfran
- Peter Gruffydd as Math
- Robert Gwyndaf as Llwyd
- Mali Harries as Cigfa
- Aneirin Hughes as Gronw
- Clare Isaac as Branwen
- Gwyn Vaughan Jones as Gwawl
- Anton Lesser as Teyrnon
- Richard Lynch as Ben
- Philip Madoc as Gwydion
- Paul McGann as Matholwch
- Richard Mylan as Pryderi
- Jack O'Kelly as Finn
- Lisa Palfrey as Arianrhod
- Meic Povey as Gwyn
- Catrin Powell as Elin
- Dilys Price as Llwyd, midwife
- Alun Raglan as Efnisien
- Paul Rhys as Lord Pwyll
- Siân Rivers as Blodeuwedd
- Mair Rowlands as Teyrnon's wife
- Dorien Thomas as Wiliam
- William Thomas as Hefeydd
- Menna Trussler as 1st midwife
- Eilian Wyn as Arawn
- Geraint Wyn as Pendaran

=== Live action ===
- Daniel Evans as Dan
- Jenny Livsey as Rhiannon
- Matthew Rhys as Lleu
- Stephen Armstrong
- Sara Cracroft
- Gruffudd Davies
- Kathryn Dimeryt
- Richard Elfyn
- John Evans
- Simon Fisher
- Tony Leader

== Reception ==
In The Guardian, Peter Bradshaw wrote: "An eccentric, forthright, and often likable excursion into the prog-rock world of sixth-century Welsh mythology, combining animation and live action."

Time Out wrote: "There's far too much narrative to annotate here; too much, indeed, to pack convincingly into a 90-minute feature. The screenplay whisks through sagas of several lifetimes with judicious concision, but the pace never quells enough for any relevant morals to cohere. The animation (essentially 'realistic' 2-D cell-style, with licks of 3-D CGI and some less persuasive photo superimposition) has a well worked, perhaps aptly antiquated quality. The 12A certificate is for a touch of sex and some lusty violence."

Jamie Russell wrote for BBC Movies: "Offering some quite unexpected flashes of bloodthirstiness and a weighty seriousness that's in keeping with the film's medieval origins, the film's animators manage to distinguish this fantastic tale from bigger budgeted, but far mushier, cartoon fare. What lets the production down, though, is the script's tendency to tie itself in knots. The central idea of the story is that each of our flesh-and-blood heroes finds that their real-world problems are paralleled in the animated Otherworld. Yet by failing to give us enough background to these characters before they enter the magical realm, the dynamics of the script fall resoundingly flat – something that's only exacerbated by the fact that none of these characters look enough like their animated counterparts to encourage any kind of identification. ... As it stands, it's simply a missed opportunity."

In Empire, William Thomas wrote: "The direction of the live action bookends to this unimpressive but well-meaning piece of TV animation is unforgivably shoddy, with the links between the contemporary characters and their mythic counterparts tenuous, to say the least. The cartoon tales themselves fare a little better, although, for the uninitiated, they form a confusing and rather rushed introduction to this particular folklore. It's not even as if the animation is of a sufficiently eye-catching style to merit a cinema release – when computer effects briefly enter the fray, the results are appalling. There's a place for it as a Friday afternoon treat during history lessons in Welsh schools, but that's as far as it goes."

In Sight and Sound Andrew Osmond wrote: "Animated by studios in Wales, Moscow and Budapest, Otherworld is an impressively ambitious undertaking. But viewed as anything other than a classroom aid for teachers of medieval Welsh literature, it is hugely disappointing. Aspiring to evoke the tapestry-like complexity of mythic ur-narratives, with all their digressions and convergences, the film is artlessly tangled and dramatically flat and this confused control of the narrative isn't helped by the cutting between already dense individual tales. ... In Britain, there are plenty of master animators who owe nothing to Disney, including Barry Purves and Joanna Quinn (who contributed to S4C's version of The Canterbury Tales). Perhaps a film that used their diverse, quirky styles to play up the contrast between the different Mabinogion tales might have been more suitable for a story in which magic plays such an unregulated, spontaneous role. As it stands, Otherworld is a misconceived folly that brings to mind another of S4Cs literary animations: Don Quixote."

== See also ==
- List of animated feature films
