= Charlotte Kennedy =

English actress (born 1994)

- Born: Charlotte Emily Ball; 4 July 1994 (age 32); Banbury, Oxfordshire, England
- Education: Mountview Academy of Theatre Arts
- Years active: 2015–present

Charlotte Emily Ball (born 4 July 1994), known professionally as Charlotte Kennedy, is an English actress. She is known for her work in musical theatre.

== Early life ==
Kennedy was born in Banbury, Oxfordshire. She began playing cello at age 7 and also took singing lessons, and developed an interest in musical theatre at age 15. From 2010 to 2012, she studied Performing and Production Arts at Stratford-upon-Avon College. She would later return to the college as a tutor for the Foundation in Musical Theatre course and a visiting specialist to lead Masterclasses. She graduated from the Mountview Academy of Theatre Arts in 2015 with a Bachelor of Arts in Musical Theatre. She taught Masterclasses through MTDA.

== Career ==
Kennedy made her West End debut as Cosette in Les Misérables at the Queen's Theatre (later the Sondheim Theatre) in 2016. In 2017, she appeared in Honeymoon in Vegas at the London Palladium and South Pacific at Cadogan Hall.

Kennedy continued to perform in Les Misérables until it closed in 2019 so the theatre could be refurbished, after which she worked as an office temp in between auditions. She starred in a pantomime production of Cinderella at the Cambridge Arts Theatre later in 2019 and gave concerts at Brasserie Zédel and Rothamsted Manor in 2020. On 22 December 2021 Kennedy rejoined the West End Cast of Les Misérables as Cosette for a single concert performance. In 2022, she covered the role of Eliza Doolittle in My Fair Lady for its West End revival at the London Coliseum before playing the part in the production's subsequent UK and Ireland tour. The following year, Kennedy appeared in the London production of Flowers for Mrs Harris at Riverside Studios.

== Stage ==
Year	Title	Role	Notes
2016–2019, 2021	Les Misérables	Cosette	Queen's Theatre, London
2017	Honeymoon in Vegas	Vocalist	London Palladium
2017	South Pacific	Ensemble	Cadogan Hall, London
2018	The Songs of Daniel & Laura Curtis		Hippodrome, London
2018	London's Leading Luvvies Perform Alexander S. Bermange		Hippodrome, London
2019	Halloween in Concert: I Screamed a Scream		Fortune Theatre, London
2019	Cinderella	Cinderella	Cambridge Arts Theatre, Cambridge
2020	Don't Make a Scene		Concert at Brasserie Zédel
2021	Musicals at the Manor		Concert at Rothamsted Manor
2022	My Fair Lady	Eliza Doolittle (understudy)	London Coliseum
2022	My Fair Lady	Eliza Doolittle	UK & Ireland tour
2023	Flowers for Mrs Harris	Pamela / Natasha	Riverside Studios, London
