= Flowers for Mrs Harris (musical) =

2016 musical based on the novel

Flowers For Mrs Harris
- Promotional poster
- Music: Richard Taylor
- Lyrics: Richard Taylor
- Book: Rachel Wagstaff
- Basis: Mrs. 'Arris Goes to Paris by Paul Gallico
- Premiere: 18 May 2016: Crucible Theatre, Sheffield
- Productions: 2016 Sheffield 2018 Chichester; 2020 Ostrava; 2023 London; 2024 Sweden; 2025 USA

Flowers for Mrs Harris is a musical with music, lyrics and original orchestrations by Richard Taylor, and book by Rachel Wagstaff. It is based on the 1958 American novel Mrs. 'Arris Goes to Paris by Paul Gallico, which was released as Flowers for Mrs Harris in the United Kingdom.

== Productions ==
=== Sheffield (2016) ===
The musical made its world premiere at the Crucible Theatre, Sheffield opening 18 May running until 4 June 2016. The production was directed by Daniel Evans, designed by Lez Brotherston, lighting designed by Mark Henderson with Tom Brady as musical director. The cast featured Clare Burt in the title role of Mrs Harris.

This Sheffield production won 3 2016 UK Theatre Awards for Best Design (Lez Brotherston), Best Performer in a Musical (Clare Burt) and Best Musical Production, the first and last of these awards shared with the Sheffield Theatres production of Show Boat.

=== Chichester (2018) ===
The musical was revived at the Chichester Festival Theatre from 8 to 29 September 2018. The production featured mostly the same creative team as the Sheffield production including Daniel Evans as director, and the cast featured Clare Burt reprising her role as Mrs Harris.

During the COVID-19 pandemic, an archive recording of the musical during its run in Chichester was streamed online from 9 April 2020 for 30 days.

==== Cast recording ====
The complete 2018 Chichester Festival Theatre cast and orchestra reassembled over 3 days in July 2020 to record the score. The recording took place on stage at the Festival Theatre, due to the COVID-19 pandemic making it impossible to record in a studio, whereas the Festival Theatre stage was large enough to accommodate full cast and band, sufficiently distanced. It was conducted by Tom Brady, recording engineer was Mike Walker, and it was produced by Richard Taylor and Mike Walker. The recording was met with widespread critical acclaim, with Gramophone Magazine calling it “Gorgeous... wonderful... super-accomplished... a great example of how the musical has evolved in recent years and how much the worlds of opera and musicals can impact on each other”.

=== Ostrava (2020) ===
The first foreign production of the musical was the Czech production in National Moravian-Silesian Theatre in Ostrava. It was translated by Hana Nováková and directed by Gabriela Petráková. The premiere took place on 3 October 2020 with Hana Fialová in the main role. Hana Fialová won the 2022 Thalia Award in the music-dramatic genre for her outstanding performance in the main role. The production closed in Spring 2023.

=== London (2023) ===
On September 30, 2023, a new production opened at London's Riverside Studios starring Jenna Russell as Ada Harris, in a limited season running to 25 November, produced by Aria Entertainment and Tiny Giant Productions, featuring new reduced orchestrations by Jason Carr. The show won the Best Off-West End Production at the 2024 WhatsOnStage Awards, held at the London Palladium on February 11th. Annie Wensak received the 2024 Offie for Best Supporting Actor -her portrayal of Violet Butterfield.

=== Sweden (2024) ===
The premiere Swedish production played September-December 2024, produced by Wermland Opera in Karlstad. It was directed by Niklas Riesbeck, with musical direction and new orchestrations (for 35-piece orchestra) by Jonas Nydesjö. Swedish translation by Staffan Berg (lyrics) and Niklas Riesbeck (book). Ada Harris was played by Cecilie Nerfornt Thorgersen.

=== USA (2025) ===
The premiere North American production opened at The Ruth Theatre in Utah in September 2025, directed by Barta Heiner.

=== Australia (2027) ===
The Australian premiere is scheduled for October 2027, opening at the Hayes Theatre, Sydney, starring Rachael Beck as Ada Harris, directed by Julia Robertson, with musical direction by Zara Stanton. Presented by Joe Eccleston in association with Hayes Theatre Co.

== Cast and characters ==
Character	Sheffield	Chichester	London
Character	(2016)	(2018)	(2023)
Ada Harris	Clare Burt	Clare Burt	Jenna Russell
Lady Dant/Madame Colbert	Rebecca Caine	Joanna Riding	Kelly Price
Major/Monsieur Armande	David Durham	Gary Wilmot	David McKechnie
Terry/Wireless commentator	Luke Dale	Luke Latcham	Harry Singh / Richard Morse
Violet Butterfield/French char lady	Anna-Jane Casey	Claire Machin	Annie Wensak
Bob/Andre	Louis Maskell	Louis Maskell	Nathanael Campbell
Flower Girl/Dressmaker	Moyo Akande	Rhona McGregor	Issy Khogali / Abigail Williams
Albert Harris/Marquis de Chassagne	Mark Meadows	Mark Meadows	Hal Fowler
Pamela/Natasha	Laura Pitt-Pulford	Laura Pitt-Pulford	Charlotte Kennedy
Countess/Seamstress/Sybil Sullivan	Nicola Sloane	Nicola Sloane	Pippa Winslow
