= Liz Duffy Adams =

American playwright

- Born: Ipswich, Massachusetts, U.S.
- Occupation: Playwright
- Writing career
- Language: English
- Genres: Theatre
- Notable works: Born With Teeth, Or, Dog Act, The Salonnieres, Witch Hunt, or, a Discourse on the Wonders of the Invisible World, The Broken Machine
- Website: lizduffyadams.com

Liz Duffy Adams is an American playwright who has written such plays as Born With Teeth, Or, Dog Act, The Salonnieres, A Discourse on the Wonders of the Invisible World, and The Broken Machine.

Adams' play Born With Teeth won a 2021 Edgerton Foundation New Play Award. She was rewarded the 2012 "Women of Achievement Award" from the Women's Project Theater as well as a 2010 Lily Award and a 2008 Weston Playhouse Music-Theatre Award, among other honors.

== Early life and education ==
Adams is an American playwright originally from Ipswich, Massachusetts, who holds dual Irish and American citizenship. She has a BFA from NYU's Experimental Theater Wing, and an MFA in Playwriting from Yale School of Drama.

She was the 2012–13 Briggs-Copeland Visiting Lecturer in Playwriting at Harvard University. She is an alumna of New Dramatists (2001–2008).

== Reviews ==
Charles Isherwood wrote in The New York Times review of her historical play Or, "Ms. Adams fares remarkably well. Her language has a natural period flavor and a formidable wit; her characters possess the spark of fully animated spirits; and she weaves into her story both biographical detail and cultural context with grace".

In the Houston Chronicle, Robert Donahoo wrote of Born with Teeth that it "can't decide if it is about literature, history, political intrigue, religious persecution, or the wide varieties of love, and that's a good — no, make that glorious — thing. The play grabs them all and squeezes them into a trim, tight, electric production…. [a] jewel of a script".

The DC Theatre Scene review of her Discourse on the Wonders of the Invisible World, by Debbie Minter Jackson, says, "Adams has a way of transforming ominous situations into thought provoking entertaining experiences, and she handles the premise of the Salem witch trials with care that ends up being thoughtful, mysterious, and if I dare say – startlingly funny".

Robert Hurwitt wrote in his SF Gate review of her Dog Act, "It's a bright dystopian blend of pop and high culture –– Brecht's Mother Courage as a vaudeville troupe leader wandering a Waiting for Godot world as transmuted through generations of Mad Max–Road Warrior movies with some lingering influences from Peter Pan –– peppered with astonishing and exhilarating eruptions of storytelling and wondrous plays within the play".

== Notable works ==
- Dear Alien premiered at Alley Theatre in Houston, 2026
- Born with Teeth premiered at Alley Theatre in Houston, directed by Rob Melrose, in spring 2022. It made its European premier in London's West End in August 2025, starring Ncuti Gatwa and Edward Bluemel.
- The Broken Machine was scheduled to premiere at the Magic Theatre, San Francisco, in spring 2021, but was cancelled because of Covid.
- The Salonnières premiered at Greater Boston Stage Company, 2018
- Or, premiere Women's Project NYC, 2009, starring Maggie Siff; West Coast premiere at Magic Theater, San Francisco, directed by Loretta Greco.
- Witch Hunt, or, a Discourse on the Wonders of the Invisible World premiered at the Contemporary American Theatre Festival, 2012, directed by Kent Nicholson.
- Dog Act, premiere Shotgun Players Berkeley, 2004
- One Big Lie (Musical), premiere, Crowded Fire, San Francisco, 2005.
- *Wet, or, Isabella The Pirate Queen Enters The Horse Latitudes, premiere Moxie Theatre, San Diego, 2006.
- The Listener, premiere Crowded Fire San Francisco, 2008.
- The Listener of Junk City (Musical) premiere Weston Playhouse, Weston, Vermont, 2008.
- Buccaneers (with music by Ellen Maddow), premiere Children's Theatre Company, Minneapolis, 2012.
- The Reckless Ruthless Brutal Charge of It or, the Train Play, premiere Clubbed Thumb NYC, 2002; Crowded Fire, San Francisco 2002.
- A Fabulous Beast, premiere One Dream Theater NYC, 1994, starring Edie Falco.

== Awards ==
Awards include a 2021 Edgerton Foundation New Play Award. 2012 Women of Achievement award from the Women's Project Theater, a 2010 Lily Award for Playwrighting, a 2008 Weston Playhouse Music-Theatre award, a 2006 NYFA award, a 2017 Fellowship from the Massachusetts Cultural Council, and the Will Glickman award for Best New Play in 2004 (for Dog Act). She has held residencies at the MacDowell Colony, Millay Colony for the arts, and the Djerassi Resident Artists program. She was profiled in American Theatre Magazine in December 2004.

== Selected works ==
- Born With Teeth, Theatrical Rights Worldwide, 2023
- Witch Hunt, or, a Discourse on the Wonders of the Invisible World, Theatrical Rights Worldwide, 2022
- The Broken Machine, Theatrical Rights Worldwide, 2022
- The Salonnièrs, Theatrical Rights Worldwide, 2022
- Wet, or, Isabella the Pirate Queen Enters the Horse Latitudes, Theatrical Rights Worldwide, 2022
- Or, Dramatists Play Service, Inc., 2011
- Or, in New Playwrights: The Best Plays 2010, Smith and Kraus
- Dog Act in Geek Theater anthology, Underwords Press, 2014
- Dog Act, Playscripts, Inc., 2004
- New Playwrights: The Best Plays 2010, Smith and Kraus, 2011.
- 2006: The Best Ten-Minute Plays for 3 or More Actors, Smith and Kraus, 2007
- The Reckless Ruthless Brutal Charge of It, or, The Train Play, Playscripts, Inc. 2002.
- Poodle with Guitar and Dark Glasses in Best American Short Plays 2000-2001, Applause Books, 2001.
- Poodle with Guitar and Dark Glasses, Playscripts, Inc. 2001
- The Last Woman on Earth, Playscripts, Inc.
- Aphra Does Antwerp, Playscripts, Inc.
- Neon Mirage, Playscripts, Inc.
