= Evelyn Hoskins =

British actress (born 1988)

- Born: Evelyn Hoskins; 13 May 1988 (age 38); Yeovil, England
- Occupation: Actress
- Years active: 2009–present
- Website: Evelyn Hoskins - CAM

Evelyn Hoskins (born 13 May 1988) is an English actress best known for her role as Shona Wark in the British BBC1 hospital drama series Casualty.

Hoskins's other television appearances include an appearance in Holby City, also as Shona Wark, A Confession, Doctors, and a part in the E4 comedy drama Misfits in which she appears as Lucy, a shape-shifter.

== Personal life ==
Hoskins grew up in Somerset and attended Arts University Bournemouth, UK where she graduated with a BA (Hons) in Acting. She was previously engaged to Gavin & Stacey actor Mathew Horne until 2018.

== Acting career ==
Hoskins's stage debut was playing the part of Thea in Spring Awakening at the Lyric Hammersmith Theatre on 23 January 2009. Her other stage appearances include the role of Martha in The Secret Garden at Birmingham Rep and Piper in The Light Princess at The National Theatre Studio.

Hoskins played Nicky in the 2014 touring production of This Is My Family.

She has previously played as Carrie White in the Southwark Playhouse's production of Carrie.

Hoskins also played Cecile Caldwell in Cruel Intentions at the Edinburgh Fringe Festival 2019.

Hoskins played the role of Dawn in Waitress at the Adelphi Theatre from 27 January 2020 until 14 March 2020. Her run in the show was cut short as a result of the COVID-19 pandemic, which forced Waitress to close on 14 March 2020. She recently reprised the role of Dawn in the Waitress UK tour with Jenna being played by Lucie Jones until January 2022 then Chelsea Halfpenny thereafter. Sandra Marvin was also cast as Becky with Matt Willis as Dr Pomatter. The tour finished on 20 August 2022 at Theatre Royal, Norwich.

== Stage work ==
Title	Role	Director	Production
Waitress	Dawn	Diane Paulus	UK & Ireland tour
Waitress	Dawn	Diane Paulus	Adelphi Theatre (West End)
Assassins	Lynette 'Squeaky' Fromme	Bill Buckhurst	Nottingham Playhouse / Watermill Theatre
Cruel Intentions	Cecile Caldwell	Jonathan O'Boyle	Bill Kenwright Ltd
Mayfly	Loops	Guy Jones	Orange Tree Theatre
Bonnie & Clyde	Bonnie	Will Blum	The Other Place
Mrs Henderson Presents	Maureen	Terry Johnson	Royal Alexandra Theatre
Peter and the Starcatcher	Molly Aster	Luke Sheppard	Northampton Theatre Royal
A Hero's Welcome	Baba	Alan Ayckbourn	Stephen Joseph Theatre
Carrie	Carrie	Gary Lloyd	Southwark Playhouse
Alice's House of Cards	Alice	Katie Henry	Royal Festival Hall
The Boy Who Fell into a Book	Kevin	Alan Ayckbourn	Stephen Joseph Theatre
This Is My Family	Nicky	Daniel Evans	Sheffield Crucible / UK Tour
The Iguanadon Queen	Sophie	Sophie Lifschutz	The Bush Theatre
Peter Pan	Wendy	Ben Harrison / JV Mercanti	US National Tour - ThreeSixty Entertainment
The Secret Garden	Martha	Ian Brown	Birmingham Rep
Spring Awakening	Thea	Michael Mayer	Lyric, Hammersmith / Novello (West End)
Spring Awakening	Thea	Michael Mayer	Victoria Palace Theatre
42 Balloons	Carol Van Deusen	Ellie Coote	Vaudeville Theatre Staged Concert
42 Balloons	Carol Van Deusen	Ellie Coote	Lowry Theatre, Salford
Gypsy	Louise/Gypsy	Joseph Pitcher	The Mill at Sonning
Something Rotten!	Portia	Tim Jackson	Theatre Royal Drury Lane

== Television appearances ==
Year	Show	Character	Info
2009–2010	Casualty	Shona Wark	13 episodes
2010	Holby City	Shona Wark	Episode: "Downstairs Upstairs" (16 February 2010)
2010	Misfits	Lucy	Series 2, episode 1 (11 November 2010)
2014	Kerry	Hayley	TV movie – Pilot for BBC's This Country
2014	Doctors	Kim Anderson	Episode: "Charlie's Angel" (22 September 2014)
2015	The Sound of Music Live	Liesl Von Trapp	TV movie (20 December 2015)
2018	Doctors	Jo Blossom	Episode: "Go Round & Round & Round" (30 April 2018)
2019	A Confession	Halliwell's Daughter	Series 1, episodes 3 & 4 (16 & 23 September 2019)
2024	Casualty	Jools Clatton	Episode: "A History of Violence: Charlie" (16 March 2024)
