= Stratford-upon-Avon College =

Coordinates: 52.193°N 1.718°W

Location
- The Willows North; Stratford-upon-Avon, Warwickshire, CV37 9QR; England

Information
- Type: General further education college
- Department for Education URN: 130837 Tables
- Ofsted: Reports
- Chair of Governors: John Bolt
- Principal and Chief Executive: John Callaghan
- Gender: Mixed
- Age: 16 to 24
- Enrolment: 2,000 full-time, 5,000 part-time, over 300 apprentices, 300 higher education students, over 300 international students.
- Exam Centre: 31310
- UCAS Code: S74
- Website: http://www.stratford.ac.uk/

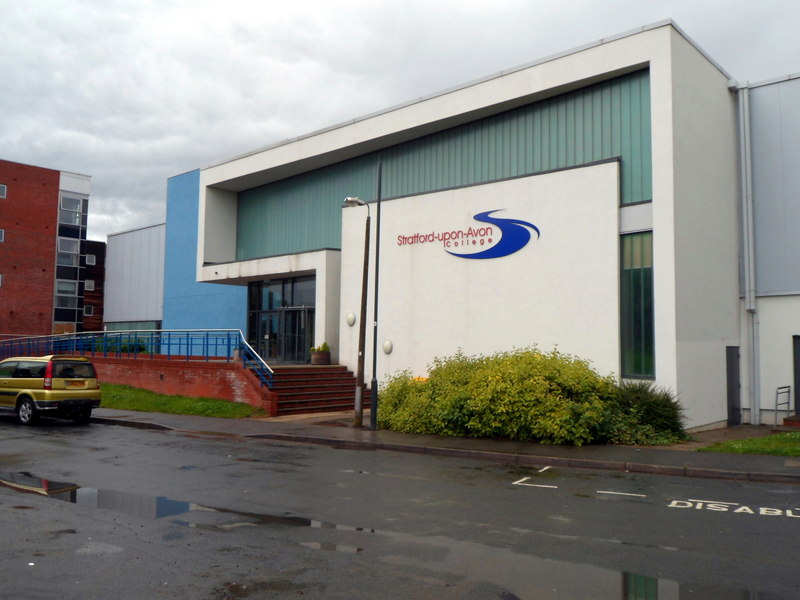

Stratford-upon-Avon College is an English further education college in Stratford-upon-Avon, Warwickshire.

== History ==
Funded by public money, the College began in Stratford-upon-Avon with the establishment of a School of Art in the summer of 1877.

Weekly classes were held in a room in Stratford-upon-Avon Town Hall - a Private Morning Class for Ladies; a Private Afternoon Class for Gentlemen; and Evening Classes for Teachers in Public Schools, Artisans and others.

In 1881 the School of Art moved to a new Art Studio in Sheep Street, Stratford-upon-Avon. In 1891, under the Technical Instruction Act 1889, rate support from the County Council was available, administered by Stratford Borough Council, to subsidise still further the Art School.

A number of special classes were started, in various Stratford locations, on butter and cheese-making (from 1891), cooking (from 1892), and wood carving, shorthand, dress cutting, laundry, and cottage nursing (from 1893).

The School of Art’s name was changed to Stratford-upon-Avon School of Science and Art.

In 1958 Stratford Technical and Art School was renamed South Warwickshire College of Further Education to recognise its very large catchment area including the Borough and the three rural districts of Stratford, Shipston and Alcester.

In 1968 the College moved to its present location at The Willows North. The Principal at the time, and throughout most of the 1970s, was Charles Jeffery: he was instrumental in setting up the Drama and Liberal Arts department and in appointing Gordon Vallins as its head. Vallins pioneered the Theatre Studies GCE A level syllabus. In September 1968, when the new College opened, there were 115 full-time students; in September 1976: 593; and the projected figure for 1977 was 630+.

In addition there were block-release and day-release classes for industry and a wide range of other part-time day and evening classes, giving a total student population of about 2,500.

In 1993, upon Incorporation, the name of South Warwickshire College of Further Education was changed to Stratford-upon-Avon College.

In February 2018, Stratford-upon-Avon College merged with Solihull College and University Centre.

=== Heart of England International Academy ===
In 2007, Stratford-upon-Avon College (est. 1877) joined with City College Coventry (est. 1832) to form the Heart of England International Academy (HEIA) in order to build upon the long-standing successes enjoyed by countless international students who have studied at each college for many years.

The HEIA has standing reputation as an outstanding provider of education and training designed specifically to support the international learner on their journey in becoming a global citizen. Whilst the provision of high quality international education and training is at the very heart of what it does, the HEIA also engages widely in cultural, business and educational institution links and projects with many partners across the globe.

== Campus ==
The main campus of the college is at The Willows North.

== Academic profile ==
The college offers a wide range of courses including Apprenticeships, Vocational Qualifications including BTEC diplomas, Foundation Learning, and Higher Education programmes including HNCs, HNDs and Degrees.

== Student life ==
The college runs a Football Academy at Stratford Town Football Club in conjunction with Coventry City FC's Academy; their team won the British College Sports West Midlands Football League in 2010/11.

The campus is a located a short walk from Stratford-upon-Avon town centre and The Maybird shopping centre, and is situated opposite Stratford-upon-Avon Railway Station and Morrisons. The college offers counselling services for students, and runs weekly tutorial and enrichment sessions. The Oasis Cafe, The Brazz and The Academy restaurants, and student accommodation are all located on campus. The Learn Zone provides an information resource and IT centre for students. During each year, two College students sit on the college's governing board as Student Governors.

== Organisation and administration ==
=== Partnerships ===
==== UK ====
- Shakespeare Birthplace Trust
- Leeds College of Music
- University of Warwick

==== China ====
- School of Humanity, Zhejiang University
- Qingdao University of Science & Technology
- Anhui Normal University Education Group
- Lishui University
- Zhejiang Ningbo Fenghua High School
- Zhejiang Suichang High School
- Beijing Shengji Art School

==== Hong Kong ====
- Hong Kong IVE - Haking Wong, Hong Kong Vocational Training Council

==== Kazakhstan ====
- Astana College of Business Management

==== Malaysia ====
- IMPERIA, College of Hospitality

==== Spain ====
- Gredos San Diego Colegios, Madrid

== Notable alumni ==
- Leo Bill, actor
- Camden Cox (born 1990), electronic dance musician
- Ben Daniels, actor (b. 1964)
- Ben Elton, comedian, writer, actor, author and director
- Stuart Goldsmith, actor
- Jo Joyner, actress
- Charlotte Kennedy, stage actress
- Joseph Mawle, actor
- Tobias Menzies, actor
- Sarah Jane Morris, rock, blues, jazz and soul singer/songwriter
- Simon Pegg, comedian turned actor/writer
- Lauren Samuels, stage actress
- Tony Tobin, celebrity chef
- Melissa Walton, actress
- Parry Glasspool, actor

== See also ==
- Education in England
- Further Education
