= This Is My Family =

- Music: Tim Firth
- Lyrics: Tim Firth
- Book: Tim Firth
- Premiere: 18 June 2013: Crucible Studio, Sheffield
- Productions: 2013 Sheffield; 2014 Sheffield and tour 2019 Chichester; 2025 London

This Is My Family is a musical by Tim Firth.

== Production history ==
=== World premiere: Sheffield (2013) ===
The musical made its world premiere at the Crucible Studio, Sheffield running from 19 June to 20 July 2013 directed by Daniel Evans. The production won the 2013 UK Theatre Award for Best Musical.

=== Sheffield revival / UK tour (2014) ===
The production returned to Sheffield at the Lyceum Theatre (opening the theatre after a £2million refurbishment) from 9 to 18 October 2014 before touring to Royal & Derngate, Northampton (21 to 25 October), Belgrade Theatre, Coventry (28 October to 1 November), Liverpool Playhouse (4 to 8 November) and New Wolsey Theatre, Ipswich (11 to 15 November).

=== Chichester (2019) ===
The musical was revived again at the Minerva Theatre, Chichester from 20 April to 15 June 2019. The production was once again directed by Daniel Evans. It starred James Nesbitt, Sheila Hancock and Clare Burt.

=== Off-West End (2025) ===
A London premiere is running from 23 May to 12 July 2025 at Southwark Playhouse, Off West End. The production is directed by Vicky Featherstone. It stars Michael Jibson, Gay Soper and Gemma Whelan.

== Cast and characters ==
Character	Sheffield	Sheffield / UK tour	Chichester	Off-West End
Character	2013	2014	2019	2025
Steve	Bill Champion	Bill Champion	James Nesbitt	Michael Jibson
May	Siân Phillips	Marjorie Yates	Sheila Hancock	Gay Soper
Yvonne	Clare Burt	Clare Burt	Clare Burt	Gemma Whelan
Nicky	Evelyn Hoskins	Evelyn Hoskins	Kirsty MacLaren	Nancy Allsop
Matt	Terence Keeley	Terence Keeley	Scott Folan	Luke Lambert
Sian	Rachel Lumberg	Rachel Lumberg	Rachel Lumberg	Victoria Elliott
