= Daniel Evans (actor) =

Welsh actor (born 1973)

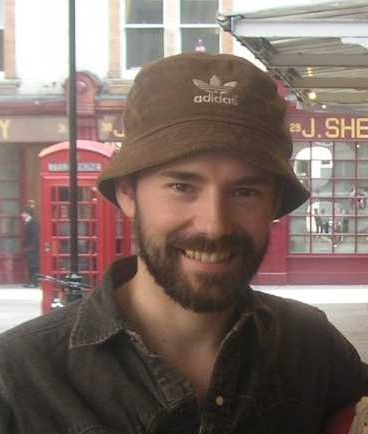
- Evans outside Wyndham's Theatre in the West End, after performing Sunday in the Park with George (2006)
- Born: Daniel Gwyn Evans; 31 July 1973 (age 53); Rhondda, Wales
- Education: Guildhall School of Music and Drama
- Occupations: Actor, director

Daniel Gwyn Evans (born 31 July 1973) is a Welsh actor and director. He is the current co-artistic director of the Royal Shakespeare Company with Tamara Harvey (since 2023) and was artistic director for Sheffield Theatres (2010–17) and Chichester Festival Theatre (2017–23).

== Background ==
Evans was born in the Rhondda Valley in Wales in 1973. Evans started acting early in life, going to the Urdd Eisteddfod, and beginning to compete there from the age of five or six, as well as going to many amateur productions. He realised it was what he wanted to do aged 8, and aged 17, he won the Richard Burton Memorial Prize at the National Eisteddfod of Wales. A year later, he won the Chair at the Urdd Eisteddfod.

He attended Ysgol Gyfun Rhydfelen near Pontypridd, a Welsh-language secondary school which has nurtured many actors.

== Career ==
=== Stage career ===
Evans trained at the Guildhall School of Music and Drama from 1991 to 1994, but joined the Royal Shakespeare Company before completing his course. With the RSC he had small roles in Coriolanus and Henry V, before playing Lysander when Adrian Noble's production of A Midsummer Night's Dream toured in New York City and on Broadway.

He appeared in the controversial play Cardiff East by Peter Gill at the Royal National Theatre in 1997, and as the title role in Peter Pan, alongside Ian McKellen and Claudie Blakley.

Directed by Trevor Nunn, he appeared in The Merchant of Venice and Troilus and Cressida, and was then cast as the hero in the operetta Candide, which also starred Simon Russell Beale. It was his first singing role, and saw him nominated for the Laurence Olivier Award for Best Actor in a Musical in 2000.

As well as Shakespeare and traditional theatre, Evans had starred in several more experimental plays. At the Royal Court Theatre, he appeared in the débuts of two Sarah Kane plays: Cleansed and 4.48 Psychosis.

After the success of Candide, Evans was soon cast in another singing role, this time the Stephen Sondheim musical Merrily We Roll Along, for which he won the Laurence Olivier Award for Best Actor in a Musical (2001).

Returning to Shakespeare, he played Ariel in Michael Grandage's production of The Tempest at the Sheffield Crucible, with Derek Jacobi starring as Prospero. For this, and for his performance in the play Ghosts, he was awarded second prize for the Ian Charleson Award in 2003. With the Royal Shakespeare Company again, he appeared in Measure for Measure and Cymbeline.

In November 2005, he starred in another Sondheim musical, Sunday in the Park with George at the Menier Chocolate Factory in the West End, playing the role of French Post-Impressionist painter Georges Seurat, opposite Anna-Jane Casey. It was directed by Sam Buntrock, and was a daring production, using extensive animation and projections to show the creation of Seurat's masterpiece, A Sunday Afternoon on the Island of La Grande Jatte as it was put together over the course of the play.

At the end of its short run at the Menier, Sunday transferred to the larger Wyndham's Theatre, where it continued until September 2006. It won five Olivier awards, including Best Actor for Evans, Best Actress for Jenna Russell, who took over Casey's role when the Menier run finished, and Outstanding Musical Production.

In January 2008, Sunday started previews at Studio 54, on Broadway, New York, with Evans and Russell reprising their parts, and a new cast from the Roundabout Theatre Company. It opened on 21 February 2008 and closed on 29 June. The revival was nominated for, but failed to win, 9 Tony Awards, including Best Actor in a Musical for Evans, Best Actress in a Musical for Russell, and Best Direction of a Musical for Sam Buntrock. Evans was also nominated for an Outer Critics' Circle Award for Outstanding Actor in a Musical, a Drama League Award for a Distinguished Performance, and a Drama Desk Award for Outstanding Actor in a Musical, although the prizes were taken by Paulo Szot (Outer Critics' Circle and Drama Desk), and Patti LuPone, respectively.

Whilst artistic director of Sheffield Theatres, Evans appeared as Oliver in The Pride and as Bobby in the Sondheim musical Company.

Whilst co-artistic director of the Royal Shakespeare Company, Evans appeared in the title role of Edward II by Christopher Marlowe at the Swan Theatre and the 25th anniversary revival of 4.48 Psychosis at the Royal Court and The Other Place.

=== Television and film career ===
On television, he has worked extensively with the BBC, especially in period dramas, including Great Expectations with Ioan Gruffudd, Daniel Deronda with Hugh Dancy, and The Virgin Queen with Anne-Marie Duff.

Evans has also had cameo appearances in the long-running series, Spooks, Dalziel and Pascoe and Midsomer Murders.

He starred as Daniel Llewellyn in the 2005 Christmas special of Doctor Who, which introduced David Tennant as the 10th Doctor.

He appeared in The Passion in Holy Week, as St Matthew.

Evans has appeared in eight films to date: A Midsummer Night's Dream, Cameleon, Be Brave, The Barber of Siberia, Y Mabinogi, Tomorrow La Scala!, The Ramen Girl. and Les Misérables

=== Directing career ===
Evans débuted as a director in 2005 with a double-bill of Peter Gill's plays: Lovely Evening and In the Blue, and a year later directed a Welsh-language production of the play Esther. That year he also directed a reading of Total Eclipse, by Christopher Hampton, for the Royal Court Theatre's 50th Anniversary, a show which he starred in at the Menier Chocolate Factory in 2007.

In 2007 Evans returned to Guildhall to direct a student production of Certain Young Men, also by Peter Gill, with a cast of eight final year students.

On 8 April 2009, Evans was named as successor to Samuel West as artistic director of Sheffield Theatres. He took up his new role following the refurbishment of the Crucible Theatre, with his first season in February 2010. Evans has stated that he does not plan on giving up acting for directing: "I don't intend to give up acting ... for the immediate future".

In 2013, Evans directed the Simon Beaufoy play The Full Monty which opened at the Lyceum Theatre, Sheffield before touring the UK and transferring to the Noël Coward Theatre in London's West End. In 2013, he also directed the Lionel Bart musical Oliver! at the Crucible Theatre, Sheffield.

Evans directed American Buffalo at Wyndham's Theatre in 2015, and Show Boat at the Crucible Theatre in 2015, and again in 2016 at the New London Theatre following its transfer to the West End.

In December 2015, he was appointed the new artistic director at Chichester Festival Theatre and succeeded Jonathan Church in July 2016. His productions have included Forty Years On, Fiddler on the Roof, Quiz (2017, also West End 2018 and UK tour 2023), Me and My Girl, Flowers for Mrs Harris (2018), This Is My Family (2019), South Pacific (2021, also UK tour 2022) and Our Generation (2022 - also Royal National Theatre).

On 21 September 2022, it was announced that Evans with Tamara Harvey would become joint Artistic Director of the Royal Shakespeare Company succeeding Gregory Doran (as Emeritus Artistic Director) and Erica Whyman (Acting Artistic Director) from June 2023. Their first season was announced on 16 January 2024. Since taking on the role, Evans has directed Born with Teeth (2025) starring Ncuti Gatwa and Edward Bluemel in the West End (transferring to Stratford-upon-Avon in 2027), a new adaptation of Roald Dahl's The BFG (2025, also Chichester and Singapore in 2026) and an all-male production of As You Like It (2026) starring Jonathan Groff as Rosalind.

== Personal life ==
Evans saw becoming an actor as a vocation since childhood, and he has been openly gay since then, though it was difficult and he was bullied at school, ascribing it to a "macho culture". In 2011, Evans told The Guardian, regarding his upbringing in south Wales: "My family still live there. They were very liberal, thank God, and still are. They encouraged me."

== Stage and screen credits ==
=== Film ===
Year	Title	Role	Notes
1996	A Midsummer Night's Dream	Lysander	
1997	Cameleon	Elfed Davis	
1998	The Barber of Siberia	Andrew (with mask)	Original title: "Сибирский цирюльник"
1999	Great Expectations	Herbert Pocket	TV film
2001	Being Dom Joly		TV film
2002	Tomorrow La Scala!	Jonny Atkins	
2003	Y Mabinogi	Manawydan	English title: "Otherworld"
2008	The Ramen Girl	Charlie	
2011	Seeds of Arkham	Brave Thug	Short
2012	Les Misérables	Pimp	
2016	Look Back in Anger	Cliff	
2025	Mr Burton	Anthony Quayle	

=== Television ===
Year	Title	Role	Notes
1987	The Eye of the Dragon	Robin Richards	Mini-series
1987	Dramarama	Gareth	Episode: "A Spirited Performance"
1995	Soldier Soldier	Lance Corporal Alun Griffiths	Episode: "The Army Game"
2000	Doctors	Jason Bridgers	Episode: "All That Glitters"
2001	Love in a Cold Climate	Cedric	Mini-series
2001	The Vice	Aaron	2 episodes
2002	Helen West	Daniel Maley	Episode: "Deep Sleep"
2002	Daniel Deronda	Mordecai	Mini-series
2004	Spooks	Defence QC	Episode: "Persephone"
2005	To the Ends of the Earth	Parson Colley	Mini-series
2005	Doctor Who	Danny Llewellyn	Episode: "The Christmas Invasion"
2005	The Virgin Queen	Robert Cecil	Mini-series
2006	Dalziel and Pascoe	Rob Miclean	Episode: "Houdini's Ghost"
2007	Midsomer Murders	David Mostyn	Episode: "Death and Dust"
2008	The Passion	Apostle Matthew	Mini-series
2008	Holby City	Hallam Black	Episode: "Not in the Stars"

=== Theatre (as actor) ===
Year	Play	Role	Venue(s)	Notes
1994	Henry V	Boy	Royal Shakespeare Theatre, Stratford-upon-Avon	with Royal Shakespeare Company
1994	Coriolanus	Servant	Swan Theatre, Stratford-upon-Avon	with Royal Shakespeare Company
1994	A Midsummer Night's Dream	Francis Flute	Royal Shakespeare Theatre, Stratford-upon-Avon	with Royal Shakespeare Company
1995	Coriolanus	Volscian Servant	Barbican Centre, London & Newcastle Playhouse, Newcastle upon Tyne	with Royal Shakespeare Company
1995	A Midsummer Night's Dream	Lysander	Barbican Centre, London	with Royal Shakespeare Company
1995	Henry V	Boy	Barbican Centre, London & Theatre Royal, Newcastle upon Tyne	with Royal Shakespeare Company
1996	A Midsummer Night's Dream	Lysander	Golden Gate Theatre - San Francisco, Shubert Theatre - Chicago, Eisenhower Theater - Washington, D.C. & Lunt-Fontanne Theatre - New York City	with Royal Shakespeare Company
1996	Easy Terms	Howard	Sherman Theatre, Cardiff	
1997	Cardiff East	Neil	Cottesloe Theatre, Royal National Theatre, London & New Theatre, Cardiff	
1997-1998	Peter Pan	Peter Pan	Olivier Theatre, Royal National Theatre, London	
1998	Cleansed	Robin	Royal Court Theatre, London	
1999	Troilus and Cressida	Patroclus	Olivier Theatre, Royal National Theatre, London	
1999	The Merchant of Venice	Lorenzo	Royal National Theatre, London	
1999	Candide	Candide	Olivier Theatre, Royal National Theatre, London	
2000	Other People	Stephen	Royal Court Theatre, London	
2000-2001	Merrily We Roll Along	Charley Kringas	Donmar Warehouse, London	
2001	4:48 Psychosis		Royal Court Theatre, London	
2002	Where Do We Live	Stephen	Royal Court Theatre, London	
2002	Ghosts	Oswald Alving	Festival Theatre - Malvern, New Wolsey Theatre - Ipswich, Warwick Arts Centre - Coventry, The Lowry - Salford, Gateway Theatre - Chester, Grand Theatre - Blackpool, York Theatre Royal - York, Cambridge Arts Theatre - Cambridge, Greenwich Theatre - London & Yvonne Arnaud Theatre - Guildford	with English Touring Theatre
2003	The Tempest	Ariel	The Old Vic, London & Crucible Theatre, Sheffield	
2003	Measure for Measure	Angelo	Royal Shakespeare Theatre, Stratford-upon-Avon	with Royal Shakespeare Company
2003	Cymbeline	Posthumus Leonatus	Swan Theatre, Stratford-upon-Avon	with Royal Shakespeare Company
2004	Cloud Nine	Betty/Edward	Crucible Theatre, Sheffield	
2005	Grand Hotel	Otto Kringelein	Donmar Warehouse, London	
2005	Sunday in the Park with George	Georges Seurat	Menier Chocolate Factory, London	
2006	Sunday in the Park with George	Georges Seurat	Wyndham's Theatre, London	
2007	Total Eclipse	Paul Verlaine	Menier Chocolate Factory, London	
2007	Sweeney Todd: The Demon Barber of Fleet Street	Tobias Ragg	Southbank Centre, London	
2007	Good Thing Going	Part of a Revue	Cadogan Hall, London	
2008	Sunday in the Park with George	Georges Seurat	Studio 54, New York City	
2009	The Art of News		Kings Place, London	with London Sinfonietta
2011	The Pride	Oliver	Crucible Theatre, Sheffield	
2011	Company	Robert	Crucible Theatre, Sheffield	
2022	Stephen Sondheim's Old Friends	George	Sondheim Theatre	One-night only gala
2025	Edward II	Edward II	Swan Theatre, Stratford-upon-Avon	with Royal Shakespeare Company
2025	4:48 Psychosis	Performer	Royal Court Theatre	co-production with Royal Court Theatre and Royal Shakespeare Company (revival of 2001 production)
2025	4:48 Psychosis	Performer	The Other Place, Stratford-upon-Avon	co-production with Royal Court Theatre and Royal Shakespeare Company (revival of 2001 production)

=== Theatre (as director) ===
Year	Title	Venue
2010	An Enemy of the People	Crucible Theatre, Sheffield
2011	Othello	Crucible Theatre, Sheffield
2011	Racing Demon	Crucible Theatre, Sheffield
2012	Macbeth	Crucible Theatre, Sheffield
2012	The Golden Age of Broadway	Royal Festival Hall, London
2012	My Fair Lady	Crucible Theatre, Sheffield
2013	The Full Monty	Lyceum Theatre, Sheffield
2013	This Is My Family	Crucible Theatre, Sheffield
2013	Oliver!	Crucible Theatre, Sheffield
2014	The Sheffield Mysteries	Crucible Theatre, Sheffield
2014	Anything Goes	Crucible Theatre, Sheffield
2014	The Full Monty	Noël Coward Theatre, London
2015	The Effect	Crucible Theatre, Sheffield
2015	Show Boat	Crucible Theatre, Sheffield
2015	American Buffalo	Wyndham's Theatre, London
2016	Flowers for Mrs Harris	Crucible Theatre, Sheffield
2016	Show Boat	New London Theatre, London
2017	Forty Years On	Chichester Festival Theatre, Chichester
2017	Fiddler on the Roof	Chichester Festival Theatre, Chichester
2017	Quiz	Minerva Theatre, Chichester
2018	Quiz	Noël Coward Theatre, London
2018	Me and My Girl	Chichester Festival Theatre, Chichester
2018	Flowers for Mrs Harris	Chichester Festival Theatre, Chichester
2019	This Is My Family	Minerva Theatre, Chichester
2021	South Pacific	Chichester Festival Theatre, Chichester
2022	Our Generation	Olivier Theatre, Royal National Theatre, London
2022	Our Generation	Chichester Festival Theatre, Chichester
2022	South Pacific	UK tour
2022	Local Hero	Minerva Theatre, Chichester
2023	Black Superhero	Royal Court Theatre, London
2023	Quiz	UK tour
2025	Born with Teeth	Wyndham's Theatre, London
2025	The BFG	Royal Shakespeare Theatre
2026	The BFG	Chichester Festival Theatre, Chichester
2026	The BFG	Esplanade – Theatres on the Bay
2026	As You Like It	Royal Shakespeare Theatre
2027	Born with Teeth	Swan Theatre, Stratford-upon-Avon

== Awards and nominations ==
Year	Award	Category	Nominated work	Result
2000	Laurence Olivier Awards	Best Actor in a Musical	Candide	Nominated
2001	Laurence Olivier Awards	Best Actor in a Musical	Merrily We Roll Along	Won
2002	Ian Charleson Awards	—N/a	Ghosts & The Tempest	Nominated
2007	Laurence Olivier Awards	Best Actor in a Musical	Sunday in the Park with George	Won
2008	Tony Awards	Best Actor in a Musical	Sunday in the Park with George	Nominated
2008	Outer Critics Circle Awards	Outstanding Actor in a Musical	Sunday in the Park with George	Nominated
2008	Drama League Awards	Distinguished Performance	Sunday in the Park with George	Nominated
2013	UK Theatre Awards	Best Touring Production	The Full Monty	Won
2013	UK Theatre Awards	Best Musical	This Is My Family	Won
2014	WhatsOnStage Awards	Best Regional Production	My Fair Lady	Won
2014	Laurence Olivier Awards	Best New Comedy	The Full Monty	Nominated
2015	WhatsOnStage Awards	Best Regional Production	Oliver!	Won
2016	UK Theatre Awards	Best Musical Production	Flowers for Mrs. Harris & Show Boat	Won
2017	Laurence Olivier Awards	Best Musical Revival	Show Boat	Nominated
