= Alley Theatre =

American theatre company (1949) and venue (1968)

- Formation: 1947
- Type: Theatre group
- Location: #redirect Template:Comma separated entries
- Artistic director: Rob Melrose
- Website: www.alleytheatre.org
Alley Theatre
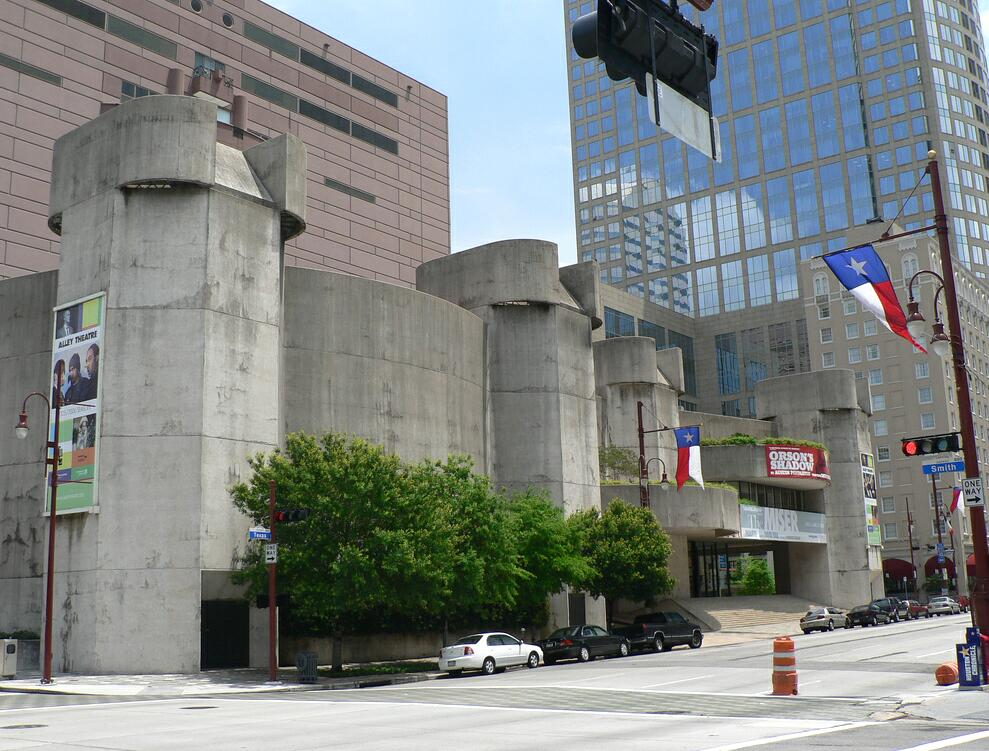
- Alley Theatre seen from the Bayou Place
- Interactive map of Alley Theatre
- Address: 615 Texas Avenue; Houston, Texas
- Coordinates: 29°45′42.71″N 95°21′55.84″W
- Capacity: Hubbard: 774; Neuhaus: 296
- Designation: United States
Construction
- Opened: October 13, 1968
- Architect: Ulrich Franzen

Alley Theatre is a Tony Award-winning theatre company in Houston, Texas. It is the oldest professional theatre company in Texas and the third oldest resident theatre in the United States. Alley Theatre productions have played on Broadway at Lincoln Center, toured more than 40 American cities, and played internationally in Berlin, Paris, and St. Petersburg.

== History ==
Under the leadership of Nina Eloise Whittington Vance (1914–1980), Alley Theatre was founded in 1947 in a "former dance studio with an opening on Main Street. A brick corridor led from Main to the back of the studio, hence the name Alley Theatre." In 1948, early paying members scouted Houston for a new location for the Alley, finally landing on an abandoned fan factory on Berry Avenue. The Alley re-opened on February 8, 1949, with a production of Lillian Helman's The Children’s Hour.

In 1954, Ms. Vance brought in Albert Dekker to guest-star in Death of a Salesman. The Alley then became a fully professional/Equity company.

The United States State Department invited Alley Theatre to represent the American Regional Theatre at the Brussels World's Fair in 1958.

In 1962, the Houston Endowment gifted land worth $800,000 and grants worth $2.5 million were awarded to the Alley from the Ford Foundation for the new building at 615 Texas Ave. In the summer of 1963, the theatre raised more than $900,000 from Houstonians. These funds helped the theatre grow from its modest beginnings into one of the most prestigious non-profit resident theatres in the United States.

Paul Zindel's The Effect of Gamma Rays on Man-in-the-Moon Marigolds was staged at the Alley in 1964 and in 1971 Zindel won the Pulitzer Prize for Drama for the work.

In 1996, Alley Theatre won the Regional Theatre Tony Award and has toured 40 American cities and abroad.

In 1977, Nina Vance was invited on the State Department tour of Russian theater, which led to an invitation from Nina to Galina Volchek, director of the Sovremennik Theater of Moscow, to come to Houston to produce Mikhail Roschin’s play, Echelon. This marked the first time a Russian had been invited to the U.S. to recreate a play precisely as it appeared in the Soviet Union.

Having forged alliances with such international luminaries as Edward Albee, Vanessa Redgrave and Frank Wildhorn, landmark theatrical events at the Alley have included the world premieres of Jekyll & Hyde, The Civil War, and in 1998, Not About Nightingales a newly discovered play by Tennessee Williams, which moved to Broadway in 1999 and was nominated for six Tony Awards, including Best Play.

The Alley is currently led by Artistic Director Rob Melrose and Managing Director Jennifer Bielstein.

Texas Monthly writes, no other theatre "in Texas comes close" to the Alley and its "productions often rival Broadway in quality, thanks to its resident acting company (one of the few left in the country) and top-to-bottom production staff."

On March 1, 2011, Alley Theatre was awarded a Texas Medal of Arts Award by the Texas Cultural Trust, bestowed upon Texas leaders and luminaries in the arts and entertainment industry for creative excellence and exemplary talent.

The theatre was completely renovated in the mid-2010s but was flooded by Hurricane Harvey and sustained the worst damage of any Houston theatre. The Neuhaus Theatre, located on the building's basement level, was filled with seventeen feet of water. The company's prop storage, containing close to 100,000 props, was completely destroyed. In response to Harvey, the company commissioned a touring children's play that was performed throughout Houston area schools.

== Building ==
The opening of the new home of Alley Theatre in November 1968 was a nationally chronicled event. It has two stages – the Hubbard Stage, which has 774 seats, and the more intimate Neuhaus Stage, which has 296 seats. The Alley's building at 615 Texas Ave. was designed by Ulrich Franzen, who, along with Ms. Vance, wanted to create "a building that sings from any viewpoint." The theatre building has no right angles but does have wide bands and terraces and is “reminiscent of Frank Lloyd Wright’s buildings.” Franzen selected the concrete exterior because he was inspired by Houston's location and the warm weather of the Southwest. There are three triangles in the main building and "the curves cling to and move around the triangles."

Franzen designed the Alley in what is known as the Brutalist style, which was popular from the 1950s through the mid-1970s. The term "brutalism" was coined in 1953 and comes from the French béton brut meaning "raw concrete". Concrete is the material most widely associated with Brutalist architecture.

The Alley's building is among many famous Brutalist structures, including Washington D.C.'s L'Enfant Plaza, the J. Edgar Hoover Building, and the Metro stations (WMATA), Yale University's Art and Architecture Building, Boston City Hall, the FBI Academy, and the Royal National Theatre (London).

The new Alley Theatre became "the most modern, elastic theatre house in the world for the dramatic arts" thanks to Yale University professor George Izenour's first-of-its-kind light grid, adjustable walls and analogue recorder. The tension wire grid, which Izenour described as similar to a bedspring, was made of a couple miles of aircraft cable, which formed a mesh 19 feet above the stage, allowing lighting technicians to easily walk on it before shows to adjust lighting and eliminated the need for footlights, spotlights and curtains.

Houston architect Preston Bolton wrote of Franzen and the Alley building, "I believe the architect, Ulrich Franzen, has created a most successful building for the Alley Theatre – one that will receive much recognition for the city, and enhance the excellent productions that are to come."

Newsweek wrote about the new Alley Theatre, "the most striking theatre in the U.S. … another step along the road toward ending Broadway's domination of the American theatre," and Sydney Johnson of The Montreal Star wrote, "… it looks as though the new Alley Theatre is going to be one of the best – and probably the very best – in the U.S. at least, simply because the building has been designed to house a specified stage and auditorium instead of the other way round." The new theater was deemed "a very successful statement of both theatrical and architectural values" and was cited by the American Institute of Architects as “inside and out, a brilliant theatrical event.” Of the Brutalist theatres built in the 1960s, including the Vivian Beaumont at Lincoln Center, Arena Stage in Washington D.C., Mark Taper Forum in Los Angeles, and the Guthrie Theatre in Minneapolis, only the Alley Theatre's architect, Franzen, won the national Honor Award from the American Institute of Architects for designing the theatre (1972).

In 1994, Alley Theatre was chosen to receive the Twenty-Five Year Award by the American Institute of Architects/Houston, which recognizes distinguished architecture of lasting quality.

In 1996, the Alley was featured in the Book of American Architecture: 500 Notable Buildings from the 10th Century to Present by G. E. Kidder Smith.

In June 2001, Tropical Storm Allison severely damaged the Neuhaus Stage located on the basement level of the theatre. The flood destroyed the theatre's costume, props, and scenic shops. The theatre was flooded with 14 feet of water.

In 2002, the Alley unveiled its new Center for Theatre Production, a 75,000-square-foot facility. It is adjacent to the main theatre building.

The Houston Press, along with others like the George R. Brown Convention Center, ranked the building as one of the ten least photogenic buildings in Downtown Houston. John Nova Lomax, the author of the list, commented "Yeah, yeah, I like the curves and all that, but this concrete hulk still looks like something Stalin's favorite architect would have come up with on 'shrooms."

In 2017, Hurricane Harvey brought massive flooding to the greater Houston region. Flood improvements made by the Alley after Tropical Storm Allison in 2001, such as flood doors on the basement level, held. However, water entered the Alley basement through an electrical box located in the theatre's driveway. The Alley Theatre's Neuhaus Stage was flooded with 17 feet of water and most of the theatre's prop collection, dating back to the 1940s, was destroyed. A massive renovation was undertaken and the theatre re-opened 2 months later in time for its annual production of A Christmas Carol.

== Building renovation ==
In 2013–2015, the Alley underwent a $46.5 million building renovation, the first major improvements since the building opened in 1968, including major improvements to the Hubbard Theatre, backstage area, and public spaces. The renovation was funded by private and public contributions to the Alley through the Extended Engagement Capital Campaign. Improvements included the installation of a new four-story fly loft, creation of a fully trapped stage floor allowing for an orchestra pit and actor and scenery entrances/exits, and a more intimate relationship between the audience's seating area and the stage. New audience amenities included new seats, expanded restrooms and a new lobby space with a skyline view. With more than 350 performances annually, the Alley produces more performances than all other performing arts organizations in the Houston Theater District combined. Alley Theatre's historic renovation of the Hubbard Theatre opened to the public on October 2, 2015, with One Man, Two Guvnors.

== TYPE ==
The Alley sponsors what is known as the Texas Young Playwrights Exchange (TYPE), which offers a skills-enhancing experience for people under the age of twenty who want to write for the stage.

== World premieres ==
- The Effect of Gamma Rays on Man-in-the-Moon Marigolds by Paul Zindel, 1965
- Scream by Arthur Laurents, 1978
- The Last Flapper by William Luce, 1987
- Heaven's Hard by Jordan Budde, 1989
- Road to Nirvana by Arthur Kopit, 1990
- Act of Passion by John Tyson, 1990
- Jekyll & Hyde, music by Frank Wildhorn, book and lyrics by Leslie Bricusse, 1990
- The Czar of Rock & Roll, music and lyrics by Rusty Magee, book by Lewis Black, 1990
- Svengali, music by Frank Wildhorn, book by Gregory Boyd, lyrics by John Bettis, Gregory Boyd, and Frank Wildhorn, 1991
- The Kiddie Pool by Michael Wilson, 1992
- American Vaudeville by Tina Landau and Anne Bogart, 1992
- The Baltimore Waltz by Paula Vogel, 1992
- Hamlet: A Monologue by Robert Wilson, 1995
- Hydriotaphia or the Death of Dr. Brown by Tony Kushner, 1998
- Not About Nightingales by Tennessee Williams, 1998
- The Civil War by Frank Wildhorn, Gregory Boyd, and Jack Murphy, 1998*
- Lemonade by Eve Ensler, 1999
- Synergy by Keith Reddin, 2001
- The Carpetbagger's Children by Horton Foote, 2001*
- Leading Ladies by Ken Ludwig, 2004
- Be My Baby by Ken Ludwig, 2005
- Treasure Island by Ken Ludwig, 2007
- The Gershwins' An American in Paris by Ken Ludwig, 2008
- Gruesome Playground Injuries by Rajiv Joseph, 2009
- Wonderland, book by Gregory Boyd and Jack Murphy, lyrics by Jack Murphy and music by Frank Wildhorn, 2010
- Intelligence-Slave by Kenneth Lin, 2010
- The Monster at the Door by Rajiv Joseph, 2011
- A Weekend with Pablo Picasso by Herbert Siguenza, 2011
- Ether Dome by Elizabeth Egloff, 2011
- Fool by Theresa Rebeck, 2014
- Syncing Ink by NSangou Njikam, 2017
- Describe the Night by Rajiv Joseph, 2017*
- Lover, Beloved: An Evening with Carson McCullers by Suzanne Vega and Duncan Sheik, 2018
- Cleo by Lawrence Wright, 2018
- The Carpenter by Robert Askins, 2019
- High School Play: A Nostalgia Fest by Vichet Chum, 2022
- Amerikin by Chisa Hutchinson, 2022
- Born With Teeth by Liz Duffy Adams, 2022
- Noir, Music by Duncan Sheik, Book by Kyle Jarrow, Lyrics by Kyle Jarrow and Duncan Sheik, 2022
- Ken Ludwig's Lend Me a Soprano by Ken Ludwig, 2022
- A Christmas Carol by Rob Melrose, adapted from the novella by Charles Dickens, 2022
- What-A-Christmas! by Isaac Gomez, 2022
- Cowboy Bob, created by Molly Beach Murphy, Jeanna Phillips, and Annie Tippe, Music by Jeanna Phillips, Lyrics by Jeanna Phillips and Molly Beach Murphy, Book by Molly Beach Murphy, 2023
- Torera by Monet-Hurst Mendoza, 2023
- The Servant of Two Masters, translated and adapted by Rob Melrose from the original play by Carlo Goldoni, 2023
- Agatha Christie's The Murder of Roger Ackroyd, adapted by Mark Shanahan, based on the original novel by Agatha Christie, 2023
- Little Comedies by Anton Chekhov, Translated by Richard Nelson, Richard Pevear, and Larissa Volokhonsky, 2023
- The World is not Silent by Don X. Nguyen, 2024
- Thornton Wilder's The Emporium, completed by Kirk Lynn, 2024
- The Janeiad by Anna Ziegler, 2024
- December: a love years in the making by Marisela Treviño Orta, 2025
- The Body Snatcher by Katie Forgette, 2025
- Dear Alien by Liz Duffy Adams, 2026
