= Rob Melrose =

Artistic Director of Alley Theatre

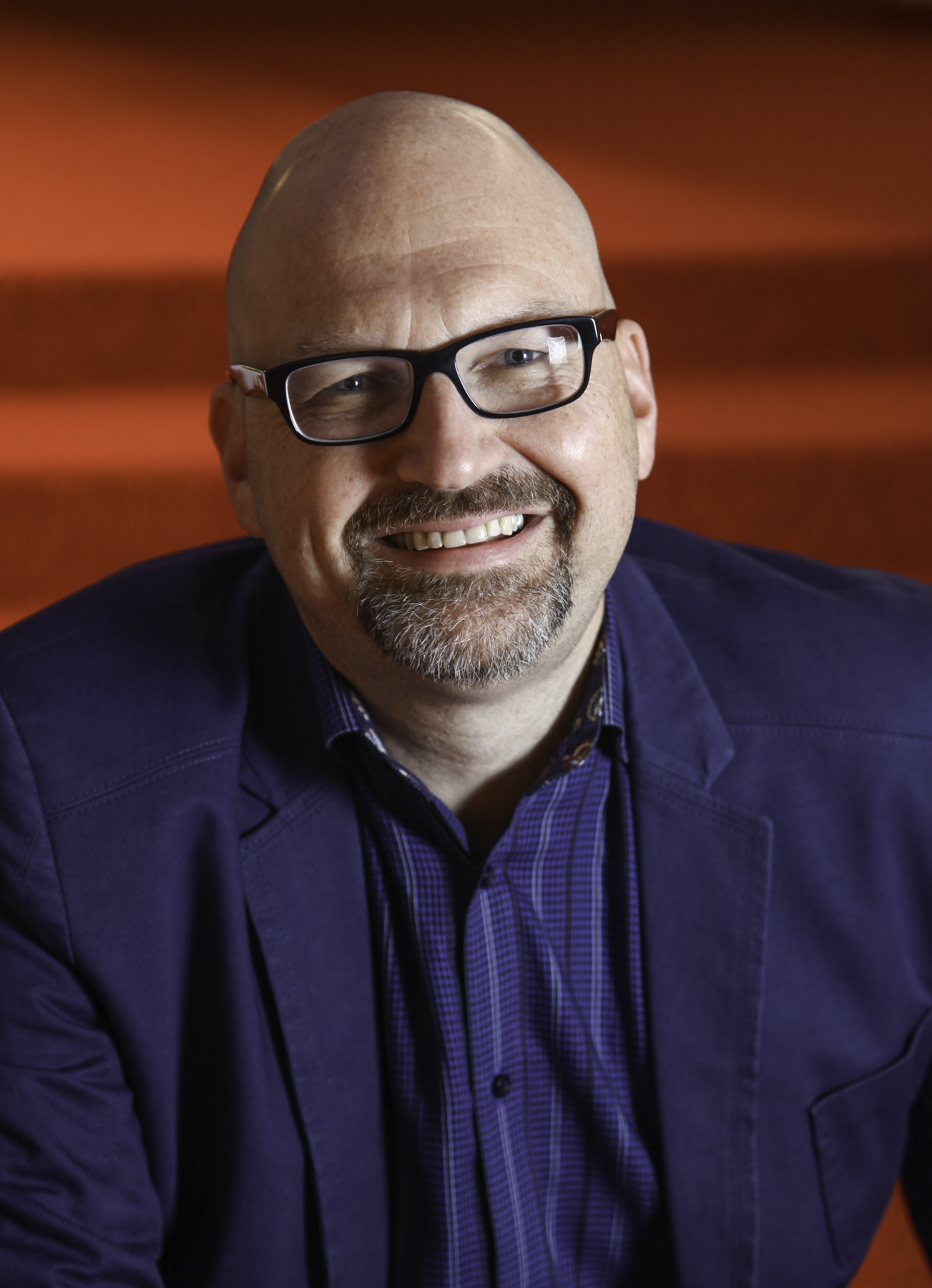
- Rob Melrose in 2018
- Education: Princeton University (B.A.); Yale School of Drama (M.F.A.)
- Occupation: Theater director
- Employer: Alley Theatre
- Spouse: Paige Rogers
- Children: 2

Rob Melrose is an American theater director and the current Artistic Director of Alley Theatre in Houston, Texas, starting in 2019. He is the former Artistic Director and co-founder of the Cutting Ball Theater. He is a playwright, adaptor, translator, and director. His work has been seen across the United States and in Europe.

== Career ==
When selected for the position of Alley Theatre artistic director, Melrose shared,

I've always thought of the Alley as the home to great artists, and I am thrilled to lead the theatre into this new chapter. The Alley has an exceptional history with high artistic standards and an appetite for risk and innovation. I am looking forward to pushing that path forward by strengthening and broadening the resident company, encouraging artistic collaboration, growing a culture where artists and staff are at ease, and most importantly creating productions and cultivating an audience that are as diverse and vibrant as the city of Houston.

The theatre will also increase internal collaboration and continue new play development.

Show	Theatre	Year	World Premiere	Director	Adaptor	Translator
A Christmas Carol	Alley Theatre	2022	Yes	Yes	Yes	
A Servant of Two Masters	Alley Theatre	2023	Yes	Yes	Yes	Yes
Born With Teeth	Alley Theatre	2022	Yes	Yes		
Agatha Christie's Murder on the Orient Express	Alley Theatre	2019	No	Yes		
The Winter's Tale	Alley Theatre	2019	No	Yes		
Pictures from Home	Alley Theatre	2024	No	Yes		
Thornton Wilder's The Emporium	Alley Theatre	2024	Yes	Yes		
The Janeiad	Alley Theatre	2024	Yes	Yes		
The Glass Menagerie	Alley Theatre	2025	No	Yes		
The Da Vinci Code	Alley Theatre	2025	No	Yes		
Thornton Wilder's The Emporium	Classic Stage Company (Off-Broadway)	2026	No	Yes		
The Importance of Being Earnest	Alley Theatre	2026	No	Yes		

== Education ==
He graduated from Princeton University with a BA in English and Theater. He received his MFA in directing from the Yale School of Drama.

== Personal life ==
Melrose currently resides in Houston, Texas. He is married to fellow theatre artist Paige Rogers with two kids.
